= List of plantations in Alabama =

This is a list of plantations and/or plantation houses in the U.S. state of Alabama that are National Historic Landmarks, listed on the National Register of Historic Places, listed on the Alabama Register of Landmarks and Heritage, or are otherwise significant for their history, association with significant events or people, or their architecture and design.

A 2014 article listed numerous plantation houses that were endangered or had already been lost.

Color key	Historic register listing
	National Historic Landmark
	National Register of Historic Places
	Contributing property to a National Register of Historic Places historic district
	Alabama Register of Landmarks and Heritage
	Alabama Century and/or Heritage Farm (Alabama Department of Agriculture)
	Not listed on national or state register

Historic register/ Reference number	Name	Image	Locality	County	Notes
85002925	Aduston Hall		Gainesville; 32.81317°N 88.15933°W	Sumter	Built from 1844–46 for Amos Travis, a native of Georgia. It is a major contributing property to the Gainesville Historic District.
	Adventure Plantation		Faunsdale vicinity 32.44485°N 87.64699°W	Marengo	Co-owned by H. A. Tayloe, William Henry Tayloe and Benjamin Ogle Tayloe. Later part of Cuba Plantation.
	Alpine		Alpine; 33.35113°N 86.23722°W	Talladega	Built for Nathaniel Welch, a native of Virginia, by Almarion Devalco Bell in 1858.
93000598	Altwood		Faunsdale; 32.42533°N 87.68124°W	Marengo	Built in 1836 for Richard Henry Adams and Anna Carter Harrison, both natives of Virginia.
70000103	Arlington		Birmingham; 33.49991°N 86.83880°W	Jefferson	Built from 1845–50 for William S. Mudd, a native of Kentucky. The plantation was in the community of Elyton prior to the American Civil War. It was used as a headquarters by federal troops during the war. The plantation and community were eventually absorbed by Birmingham, a city that Mudd helped establish after the war.
94000690	Atkins' Ridge		Greensboro; 32.69073°N 87.57666°W	Hale	Built for John Atkins, a native of Virginia, in 1840.
94000686	Augusta Sledge House		Newbern; 32.51972°N 87.56888°W	Hale	Built in the cottage orné style in 1855. It was razed during the 21st century.
73000337	Barton Hall		Cherokee; 34.75079°N 88.00268°W	Colbert	Listed as a National Historic Landmark, this house is considered to be an "unusually sophisticated Greek Revival style plantation house". It was completed in 1849 by Armstead Barton, a native of Tennessee.
94000698	Battersea		Prairieville; 32.51028°N 87.70306°W	Hale	One of several contiguous Vaughan family plantations. The Vaughans were natives of Petersburg, Virginia. The main house began as a log house during the 1820s, but was expanded and completed circa 1845.
72000164	Belle Mina		Belle Mina; 34.64479°N 86.88078°W	Limestone	One of the earliest plantation houses with a monumental portico in the state, Belle Mina was built from 1826–35 for Alabama's second governor, Thomas Bibb. Bibb was a native of Amelia County, Virginia.
82002003	Belle Mont		Tuscumbia vicinity 34.66167°N 87.66694°W	Colbert	Built between 1828 and 1832 for Dr. Alexander W. Mitchell, a native of Virginia. Considered by architectural scholars to be a clear example of Thomas Jefferson's influence upon the architecture of the early United States.
	Belvoir		Pleasant Hill vicinity 32.20278°N 86.96184°W	Dallas	This plantation was established in 1825 by Reuben Saffold II, a native of Wilkes County, Georgia. The current main house was built circa 1845.
94000692	Bermuda Hill		Prairieville; 32.53005°N 87.69419°W	Hale	Although the exact builder is unclear, the house was built circa 1845. The property was owned by William W. Manning, a native Montgomery, who sold it in 1845 to his brother-in-law, William Weeden, a native of Madison County.
82002014	Boligee Hill		Boligee; 32.75972°N 87.98889°W	Hale	Built 1840, Now known as Myrtle Hill.
94000685	Borden Oaks		Greensboro; 32.71787°N 87.68931°W	Hale	Built 1835–37
86001544	Bride's Hill		Wheeler; 34.67024°N 87.24452°W	Lawrence	Built 1830
74000396	Buena Vista		Prattville; 32.42444°N 86.45194°W	Autauga	Built c.1822–1844
	Bullard Plantation		Perdue Hill; 31.50564°N 87.53170°W	Monroe	Built 1858–59
93000763	Cedar Crest		Faunsdale; 32.42751°N 87.66042°W	Marengo	Built 1850
93000599	Cedar Grove Plantation		Faunsdale; 32.44782°N 87.57584°W	Marengo	Built 1848
93000600	Cedar Haven		Faunsdale; 32.41768°N 87.58691°W	Marengo	Built 1850, destroyed during 1990s.
	Chasley Farms		Franklin; 31.70467°N 87.45651°W	Monroe	Built 1835, rare intact plantation complex.
84000384	Cherokee Plantation		Fort Payne; 34.48707°N 85.67179°W	DeKalb	Built 1821, with later expansions.
85002924	Colgin Hill		Gainesville; 32.80916°N 88.15527°W	Sumter	Built 1832
	Cook Hill		Camden vicinity 31.98732°N 87.38651°W	Wilcox	Built 1839, an I-house.
95000147	Countryside		Camden; 31.97182°N 87.37740°W	Wilcox	Built 1855, also known as the Tait-Ervin House
89000310	Creekwood		Creek Stand; 32.30000°N 85.47944°W	Macon	Built 1850
	Crumptonia		Crumptonia; 32.21400°N 87.28900°W	Dallas	Built 1855
93000601	Cuba Plantation		Faunsdale; 32.44485°N 87.64699°W	Marengo	Built 1850
87001552	Davidson Plantation		Centreville; 32.94277°N 87.13361°W	Bibb	Built for Samuel Wilson Davidson, a native of North Carolina, in 1837.
93001517	Dellet Plantation		Claiborne; 31.53884°N 87.50752°W	Monroe	Built c.1835–40
	Dicksonia		Lowndesboro; 32.25797°N 86.60869°W	Lowndes	Built 1830–56, burned 1939. Rebuilt 1940, burned 1964.
	Drish Plantation		Tuscaloosa; 33.19755°N 87.56185°W	Tuscaloosa	Built 1837, remodeled 1855. House is only remnant of plantation, long overtaken by city growth.
99000250	Dry Fork Plantation		Coy; 31.90167°N 87.36056°W	Wilcox	Built 1832–34
	Eden		Carlowville vicinity 32.13620°N 87.24959°W	Dallas	Built 1830
73000367	Edgewood		Montgomery vicinity 32.34684°N 86.28660°W	Montgomery	Built 1821
	Elmwood Plantation		Arcola vicinity 32.543109°N 87.791350°W	Hale	Elmwood Plantation, Established by George P. Tayloe, initially 1,140 acres, father of Col. George Edward Tayloe, CSA. Sold to Desha Smith, sister of Alva Erskine Stirling Smith Belmont wife of William Kissam Vanderbilt then Oliver H. P. Belmont, mother of the 9th Duchess of Marlboro.
	Elm Bluff		Elm Bluff; 32.17074°N 87.10347°W	Dallas	Built 1845
91001483	Elm Ridge Plantation		Greensboro; 32.71840°N 87.63399°W	Hale	Built c.1836
99000793	Everhope Plantation		Eutaw; 32.90155°N 87.97009°W	Greene	Built 1852–53
92000630	Fairhope Plantation		Uniontown; 32.44528°N 87.49083°W	Perry	Built c.1857 by Joseph Selden, FFV
93000602	Faunsdale Plantation		Faunsdale; 32.43543°N 87.60283°W	Marengo	Patented in 1832 by H. A. Tayloe of nearby "Walnut Grove Plantation" and built 1844 by Dr. Thomas Alexander Harrison. Extant slave quarters still on property.
97001166	Forks of Cypress		Florence; 34.84500°N 87.72556°W	Lauderdale	Built 1830, struck by lightning and burned 1966.
72000167	Gaineswood		Demopolis; 32.508726°N 87.835239°W	Marengo	Built 1843–61
79000402	Glennville Plantation		Pittsview vicinity 32.11452°N 85.17391°W	Russell	Built 1840s, contributing property to the Glennville Historic District.
80000735	Glenn-Thompson Plantation		Pittsview; 32.13667°N 85.15167°W	Russell	Built 1837
78000488	Glencairn		Greensboro; 32.70028°N 87.59583°W	Hale	Built 1835
	Grace-Chesnut House		Oak Hill vicinity 31.93566°N 87.05146°W	Wilcox	Built 1852, an I-house.
82001617	Grassdale		Eutaw; 32.86167°N 87.92389°W	Greene	Built c.1820.
	Greene Springs			Marengo	For Sale 1842, by Henry Augustine Tayloe
80000364	Grey Columns		Tuskegee; 32.42639°N 85.70500°W	Macon	Built 1854
89000162	Greenwood		Alexandria	Calhoun	Built 1842–1850; also known as Greenwood Plantation
87001784	Alfred Hatch Place at Arcola		Arcola; 32.56658°N 87.77001°W	Hale	Built 1856
94000694	Hawthorne		Prairieville; 32.51284°N 87.69836°W	Hale	Built 1818–1862
85000452	Hawthorne		Pine Apple; 31.88006°N 86.98912°W	Wilcox	Built 1854
	Dr. William Hughes Plantation		Aliceville vicinity 33.08888°N 88.06679°W	Pickens	Built from 1845–50, known for its extremely elaborate interior plasterwork. It was razed in 1939.
93001012	Idlewild		Talladega vicinity 33.51028°N 86.04583°W	Talladega	Built 1843
	Ingleside		Aliceville; 33.11893°N 88.14669°W	Pickens	Built 1849
70000101	Ivy Green		Tuscumbia; 34.73944°N 87.70667°W	Colbert	Built 1820
	Kenan Plantation		Selma vicinity 32.45848°N 87.03832°W	Dallas	Built c.1840
90001318	Kenworthy Hall	Kenworthy Hall in 2011.	Marion; 32.63514°N 87.35222°W	Perry	Built 1858–60
76000327	Kirkwood		Eutaw; 32.84667°N 87.89583°W	Greene	Built 1858
	Lakewood		Livingston; 32.58749°N 88.18372°W	Sumter	Built 1840
	Larkin Plantation		Tayloe, Alabama; 32.434133°N 87.437775°W	Perry	Founded by John Larkin then purchased by William Henry Tayloe who expanded it to 2,085 acres. Winney Grimshaw is documented working here from ages 33 to 40. William lived there for sometime during the Civil War leaving Mount Airy, in Virginia to be tended to by his son Henry Augustine Tayloe II, whom eventually inherited it and this plantation.
	Lee Haven		Livingston vicinity 32.49555°N 88.12058°W	Sumter	Built 1840, an I-house.
84000751	Liberty Hall		Camden; 31.97194°N 87.33667°W	Wilcox	Built 1855
	Macon Station		Gallion; 32.497981°N 87.713593°W	Hale	Founded by H. A. Tayloe as a Rail Station on the Selma-Demoplis Line.
	Magnolia Crest		Burkville vicinity 32.31983°N 86.52512°W	Lowndes	Built 1840s
76000355	Magnolia Green		Seale vicinity 32.34601°N 85.13239°W	Russell	Built 1840
73000345	Magnolia Grove		Greensboro; 32.70429°N 87.60786°W	Hale	Built 1840
76000328	Magnolia Hall		Greensboro; 32.702222°N 87.590278°W	Hale	Built c. 1855, contributing property to the Greensboro Historic District
73000356	Marengo		Lowndesboro; 32.28402°N 86.60916°W	Lowndes	Built 1847, contributing property to Lowndesboro Historic District.
82002010	Marshall's Grove		Selma; 32.46611°N 87.00639°W	Dallas	Built 1840
	Meadow Hill Plantation		Siddonsville	Marengo	Tayloe Family Plantation, Canebrake. Later part of Sidson/Siddons Plantation
	McMillan Plantation		Orrville vicinity 32.17109°N 87.18250°W	Dallas	Built 1858
73000356	Meadowlawn		Lowndesboro; 32.27726°N 86.61047°W	Lowndes	Built 1853, contributing property to Lowndesboro Historic District.
	Melrose		McShan vicinity 33.40188°N 88.11993°W	Pickens	Built 1840
88003123	Merry Oaks		Sandy Ridge; 32.02472°N 86.45167°W	Lowndes	Built 1860
89000314	Millwood		Greensboro; 32.66127°N 87.75136°W	Hale	Built 1830
	Molett House	The Molett House- 1819	Orrville vicinity 32.166068°N 87.12389°W	Dallas	Built 1819. The oldest house in Alabama owned and occupied by the family that built it.
10000523	Moore-Webb-Holmes Plantation		Marion vicinity 32.67411°N 87.39617°W	Perry	Established 1819
73000331	Montebrier		Brierfield; 33.04250°N 86.90472°W	Bibb	Built 1853
	Moseley Grove		Orrville vicinity 32.21375°N 87.19804°W	Dallas	Built 1857
	Moss Hill		Pine Apple vicinity 31.88076°N 86.98663°W	Wilcox	Built 1845, an I-house.
	Mount Ida		Sylacauga vicinity 33.32178°N 86.17081°W	Talladega	Built 1833–59, struck by lightning and burned 1956.
	Mountain Spring Plantation		Sylacauga; 33.20073°N 86.23329°W	Talladega	Built 1842, also known as the Oden-Bledsoe-Kelly Plantation. Recorded by the HABS.
	New Hope Plantation		Gallion vicinity 32.497981°N 87.713593°W	Hale	Gothic Revival Residence of Henry Augustine Tayloe Secretary of the Alabama Diocesan Episcopal Convention. Henry gave this planation to his daughter, Narcissa Elizabeth Tayloe, who married Benjamin F Hatch, son of Alfred Hatch, whose daughter Minnie Hatch Macartney Pearson inherited it after.
72000163	Noble Hall		Auburn; 32.63972°N 85.46528°W	Lee	Built 1854
80000686	Oak Grove		Greensboro; 32.75194°N 87.67806°W	Hale	Built 1824, destroyed 1980s.
	Oakland Plantation		Uniontown vicinity 32.519767°N 87.537211°W	Hale & Perry	Co-owned by H. A. Tayloe and William Henry Tayloe. Winney Grimshaw is documented working on this plantation between the ages of 19 and 28. William gave the 2,300 acre farm to his daughter Emma, and husband Thomas Munford.
76000319	The Oaks		Tuscumbia vicinity 34.67417°N 87.59333°W	Colbert	Built 1818
	The Oaks		Selma; 32.39044°N 87.08795°W	Dallas	Built c.1850
	Oak Manor		Livingston vicinity 32.55255°N 88.13711°W	Sumter	Built 1860, now ruinous.
93000598	Oak Place		Huntsville; 34.74435°N 86.56424°W	Madison	Built 1840
73000367	Oakhurst		Emelle; 32.77916°N 88.26833°W	Sumter	Built 1854
77000212	Oaklawn		Huntsville; 34.76052°N 86.57730°W	Madison	Built 1844
	Odena Plantation		Sylacauga; 33.20797°N 86.28113°W	Talladega	Built 1835, 1855, 1935. Also known as Oden-Sanford Farm. 3037 Odena Rd S., and 2013 County Rd 45/Old Sylacauga Hwy, Sylacauga.
86001157	Orange Vale		Talladega vicinity 33.35601°N 86.16819°W	Talladega	Built 1852
76000330	Owen Plantation House		Bessemer; 33.34750°N 86.98327°W	Jefferson	Built 1838
	Patience Plantation		Furman vicinity 32.01497°N 86.97286°W	Wilcox	Built 1842
73000356	The Pillars		Lowndesboro; 32.27117°N 86.60995°W	Lowndes	Built 1856, contributing property to Lowndesboro Historic District.
92000819	Samuel R. Pitts Plantation		Pittsview; 32.17861°N 85.15778°W	Russell	Built 1846
84000717	Pitts' Folly		Uniontown; 32.44506°N 87.50830°W	Perry	Built 1852–53
85001501	Pleasant Ridge		Canton Bend; 32.05306°N 87.35028°W	Wilcox	Built 1842, a brick I-house.
77000209	Pond Spring		Wheeler; 34.65111°N 87.25239°W	Lawrence	Built 1818–80
94000687	William Poole House		Dayton; 32.34944°N 87.64472°W	Marengo	Built 1848
86000997	Preuit Oaks		Leighton vicinity 34.67528°N 87.50972°W	Colbert	Built 1847
	Ramsey-Jones-Bonner House		Oak Hill; 31.91876°N 87.07777°W	Wilcox	Built 1837–1838, an I-house.
94000697	Randolph Plantation		Prairieville; 32.50583°N 87.68722°W	Hale	Built 1850
92001844	Reverie		Marion; 32.631667°N 87.320278°W	Perry	Built c. 1858, contributing property to the West Marion Historic District.
	Rocky Hill Castle		Courtland vicinity 34.68842°N 87.33328°W	Lawrence	Built 1858–61, destroyed in 1961
93000421	River Bluff Plantation		Camden; 32.04556°N 87.33472°W	Wilcox	Built 1845
79000384	Riverdale		Selma; 32.43389°N 86.86972°W	Dallas	Built 1829
93001476	Roseland Plantation		Faunsdale; 32.44268°N 87.57219°W	Marengo	Built 1835–50s, destroyed in 1980s. Several outbuildings now at Sturdivant Hall.
	Rosemary Plantation		Millers Ferry vicinity 32.09760°N 87.40587°W	Wilcox	Built c.1858
71000099	Rosemount		Forkland; 32.67111°N 87.90778°W	Greene	Built in stages from 1832 through the 1850s. Allen Glover, a native of Edgefield District, South Carolina and resident of nearby Demopolis, gave this 3,000-acre (1,200 ha) estate, along with the beginnings of the main house situated upon its star-shaped hill, to his son, Williamson Allen Glover, in the early 1830s.
73000356	Rosewood		Lowndesboro vicinity 32.30583°N 86.58916°W	Lowndes	Built 1855, contributing property to Lowndesboro Historic District.
	Sandy Hill (Pettway Plantation)		Boykin (Gee's Bend); 32.07301°N 87.29245°W	Wilcox	Plantation founded by Joseph Gee, a native of Halifax County, North Carolina, circa 1816 in an Alabama River bend that retains his last name to the present. It passed to his nephews upon his death. They transferred it to their relative, Mark Harwell Pettway, also a native of Halifax County North Carolina, in 1845 in order to settle a $29,000 debt. Pettway brought his family and roughly 100 slaves here in 1846. All of the slaves, except for the cook, made the journey on foot. The main house was built around this time. The main house was razed sometime soon after the last owner sold the property to the Farm Security Administration in 1937. The administration built New Deal type houses and sold the tracks of farmland to what were mostly the impoverished descendants of the former Pettway slaves. The community of Boykin is at the same approximate location as the original "slave village" for the plantation.
74000418	Saunders Hall		Town Creek; 34.72523°N 87.39159°W	Lawrence	Built 1830
	Sidson (Siddons) Plantation		Siddonsville	Marengo	Tayloe Family Plantation, Canebrake. Owned by B.O. Tayloe
78000494	Spring Villa		Opelika; 32.58788°N 85.31150°W	Lee	Built 1850
01001411	Stone Plantation		Montgomery; 32.35056°N 86.42528°W	Montgomery	Built 1852
	Stoutenborough Hall		Elm Bluff; 32.15813°N 87.060762°W	Dallas	Built 1850
91000095	Summers Plantation		Opelika; 32.66803°N 85.27189°W	Lee	Built 1837
85000451	Sylvan Plantation		Tuscaloosa; 33.08056°N 87.70250°W	Tuscaloosa	Built 1825
73000346	Tanglewood		Akron; 32.85316°N 87.67251°W	Hale	Built 1859
	Tasso Plantation		Orrville vicinity 32.21336°N 87.17351°W	Dallas	Built 1850s
84000618	Thornhill		Forkland; 32.68743°N 87.93191°W	Greene	Built 1833, portico added c.1850.
98000104	Thornhill		Talladega vicinity 33.40239°N 86.14264°W	Talladega	Built 1835
	Tulip Hill		Faunsdale; 32.44745°N 87.64696°W	Marengo	Home of Andrew Pickens Calhoun
	Umbria		Sawyerville vicinity 32.74847°N 87.72804°W	Hale	Built 1829–50, burned 1973.
	Underwood Plantation		Pleasant Hill; 32.16671°N 86.92284°W	Dallas	Built 1845, also known as the Green Underwood House, Underwood-Mayo Home and Black Thistle
	Wakefield		Furman vicinity 31.99821°N 86.96256°W	Wilcox	Built 1840
94000684	Waldwic		Gallion; 32.48472°N 87.71379°W	Hale	Built 1840–52
	Walnut Grove Plantation		Allenville vicinity 32.493160°N 87.679035°W	Hale & Marengo	"A frame residence of eight rooms, one of the first homes of so pretentious forms in that country," built by H. A. Tayloe, who co-owned it and was later bought out by brother George P Tayloe, who then passed it on to his son John William Tayloe, who designed Hawthorne (Prairieville, Alabama) and married Miss Lucie Randolph of "Oakleigh" plantation. B.M. Allen, of adjacent Allenville, later purchased the property.
86002044	Welch Spring		Sylacauga; 33.14344°N 86.38936°W	Talladega	Built 1830; Also known as the Welch-Averiett House
74000433	Westwood		Uniontown; 32.45966°N 87.51477°W	Perry	Built 1836–50
	White Columns Plantation		Camden vicinity 31.96075°N 87.35943°W	Wilcox	Built 1860, also known as the Tait-Starr Plantation
78000484	Wilson-Finlay House		Gainestown; 31.45378°N 87.69137°W	Clarke	Built 1846
	Windsor Plantation		Gallion; 32.460860°N 87.681660°W	Marengo	Owned by Benjamin Ogle Tayloe and Edward Thornton Tayloe, managed by H.A Tayloe
87000476	Winston Place		Valley Head; 34.568008°N 85.614901°W	DeKalb	Built 1838
80000683	Woodlands		Gosport; 31.58417°N 87.57333°W	Clarke	Built 1840
	Woodlawn Plantation		Uniontown; 32.496684°N 87.409429°W	Perry	Purchased by William Henry Tayloe in 1854, consisted of 1,200 acres and sold in 1858. Winney Grimshaw is documented working here between ages 29 and 32.
06000183	Woodlane Plantation		Eufaula; 31.84803°N 85.17099°W	Barbour	Built 1852
	Youpon		Canton Bend; 32.03300°N 87.36832°W	Wilcox	Built 1840

== See also ==
- History of slavery in Alabama
- List of plantations in the United States
