= Tayloe =

Tayloe may refer to:

== People in the United States ==
- Col. William Tayloe (the immigrant) (1599-1655), High Sheriff of York County, Virginia
- Col. William Tayloe (the nephew) (1645–1710), of Richmond and Lancaster Counties, Virginia
- Col. John Tayloe I (1688–1747), plantation owner, councillor and businessman in Virginia
- Col. John Tayloe II (1721–1779), plantation owner, councillor and horse breeder in Virginia
- Col. John Tayloe III (1770-1828), military officer, Virginia state senator, and horse breeder
- Benjamin Ogle Tayloe (1796–1868), American businessman, horse breeder, planter, and diplomat in Washington, D.C.
- William Henry Tayloe (1799–1871) American businessman, horse breeder, planter and land speculator
- Edward Thornton Tayloe (1803–1876), American diplomat and planter
- George Plater Tayloe (1804-1897), American businessman, planter, land speculator, and founder of Hollins University
- Henry Augustine Tayloe (1808-1903) American businessman, horse breeder, planter, and land speculator
- John Tayloe Lomax (1781–1862), American jurist
- Nellie Tayloe Ross (1876–1977), American politician, 14th Governor of Wyoming, and director of the United States Mint
- W. Tayloe Murphy Jr. (1933-2021), Virginia lawyer and politician
- Tayloe Harding, American composer, author and music administrator at University of South Carolina

== Historic houses ==
- The Octagon House also known as Colonel John Tayloe III House
- Benjamin Ogle Tayloe House, Washington, D.C., built in 1828 by Benjamin Ogle Tayloe
- Tayloe House (Williamsburg, Virginia), purchased by John Tayloe II

== See also ==
- Willard v. Tayloe, an 1869 U.S. Supreme Court decision
