= Faunsdale, Alabama =

- Town
- Location of Faunsdale in Marengo County, Alabama.
- Coordinates: 32°27′27″N 87°35′38″W
- Country: United States
- State: Alabama
- County: Marengo

Area
  - Total: 0.28 sq mi (0.72 km^{2})
  - Land: 0.28 sq mi (0.72 km^{2})
  - Water: 0 sq mi (0.00 km^{2})
- Elevation: 233 ft (71 m)

Population (2020)
  - Total: 90
  - Density: 324.9/sq mi (125.43/km^{2})
- Time zone: UTC-6 (Central (CST))
  - Summer (DST): UTC-5 (CDT)
- ZIP code: 36738
- Area code: 334
- FIPS code: 01-25816
- GNIS feature ID: 2406495

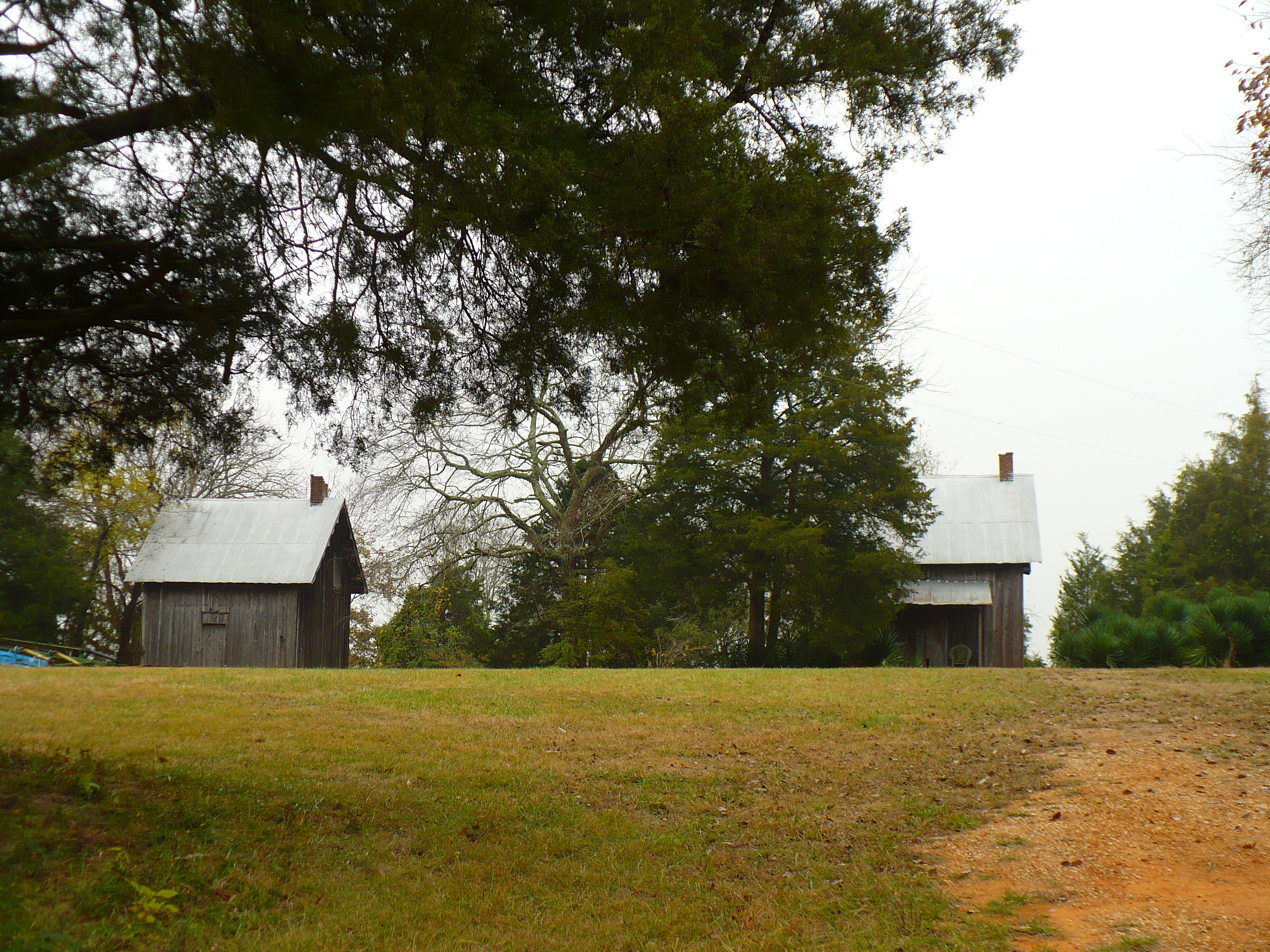
Faunsdale Plantation slave quarters in 2008

Faunsdale is a town in Marengo County, Alabama, United States. At the 2020 census the population was 90, down from 98 in 2010. Faunsdale is home to a community of Holdeman Mennonites, the only such community outside of Greensboro, Alabama. The town has the only Holdeman Mennonite Church in the area, Cedarcrest Mennonite Church.

== History ==
A post office called Faunsdale has been in operation since 1841. The town was named for nearby Faunsdale Plantation, named after a Roman god and owned since 1843 by Dr. Thomas Alexander Harrison. The town was named in his honor.

The plantation had been founded in the 1830s by Messrs Pearson and Henry Augustine Tayloe. The latter was also the local land agent for his older brothers Benjamin Ogle Tayloe, William Henry Tayloe, Edward Thornton Tayloe, and George Plater Tayloe, who all invested some of their great wealth in several plantations in this area. A 20th-century historian said they were "considered the most important pioneer cotton planters of the Canebrake, as to the extent of their enterprise there."

Faunsdale was incorporated as a town in 1907.

== Geography ==
According to the U.S. Census Bureau, the town has a total area of 0.2 square miles (0.52 km^{2}), all land. The elevation is 220 feet (67 m).

== Attractions ==
Every spring the town sponsors the annual Faunsdale Crawfish Festival, serving authentic Southern cooking on the street, with music and dancing. The same week, the bi-annual Faunsdale Biker Rally is within walking distance. It is an adult-only event, with bikers from all over the state in attendance.

A number of National Register of Historic Places-listed plantations are located a few miles from Faunsdale. They include Battersea, Bermuda Hill, Cedar Crest, Cedar Grove Plantation, Cedar Haven, Cuba Plantation, Faunsdale Plantation, and Roseland Plantation.

== Demographics ==
Historical population
Census	Pop.	Note	%±
1890	211		—
1900	333		57.8%
1910	352		5.7%
1920	268		−23.9%
1930	264		−1.5%
1940	185		−29.9%
1950	199		7.6%
1960	124		−37.7%
1970	227		83.1%
1980	174		−23.3%
1990	96		−44.8%
2000	87		−9.4%
2010	98		12.6%
2020	90		−8.2%
U.S. Decennial Census

=== Racial and ethnic composition ===
Faunsdale town, Alabama – Racial and ethnic composition Note: the US Census treats Hispanic/Latino as an ethnic category. This table excludes Latinos from the racial categories and assigns them to a separate category. Hispanics/Latinos may be of any race.
Race / Ethnicity (NH = Non-Hispanic)	Pop 2000	Pop 2010	Pop 2020	% 2000	% 2010	% 2020
White alone (NH)	47	66	60	54.02%	67.35%	66.67%
Black or African American alone (NH)	36	32	22	41.38%	32.65%	24.44%
Native American or Alaska Native alone (NH)	0	0	2	0.00%	0.00%	2.22%
Asian alone (NH)	0	0	0	0.00%	0.00%	0.00%
Native Hawaiian or Pacific Islander alone (NH)	0	0	0	0.00%	0.00%	0.00%
Other race alone (NH)	0	0	0	0.00%	0.00%	0.00%
Mixed race or Multiracial (NH)	0	0	6	0.00%	0.00%	6.67%
Hispanic or Latino (any race)	4	0	0	4.60%	0.00%	0.00%
Total	87	98	90	100.00%	100.00%	100.00%

=== 2000 census ===
As of the census of 2000, there were 87 people, 34 households, and 24 families residing in the town. The population density was 389.2 inhabitants per square mile (150.3/km^{2}). There were 36 housing units at an average density of 161.1 per square mile (62.2/km^{2}). The racial and ethnic makeup of the town was 54.02% White (non-Hispanic), 41.38% Black or African American (non-Hispanic), and 4.60% Hispanic (any race).

There were 34 households, out of which 41.2% had children under the age of 18 living with them, 64.7% were married couples living together, 8.8% had a female householder with no husband present, and 26.5% were non-families. 20.6% of all households were made up of individuals, and 8.8% had someone living alone who was 65 years of age or older. The average household size was 2.56 and the average family size was 3.04.

In the town, the population was spread out, with 29.9% under the age of 18, 3.4% from 18 to 24, 28.7% from 25 to 44, 19.5% from 45 to 64, and 18.4% who were 65 years of age or older. The median age was 37 years. For every 100 females, there were 93.3 males. For every 100 females age 18 and over, there were 96.8 males.

The median income for a household in the town was $28,750, and the median income for a family was $50,417. Males had a median income of $30,833 versus $19,500 for females. The per capita income for the town was $14,697. There were no families and 3.2% of the population living below the poverty line, including no under eighteens and none of those over 64.
