= Cedar Grove Plantation =

Historic house in Alabama, United States

- U.S. National Register of Historic Places
- U.S. Historic district
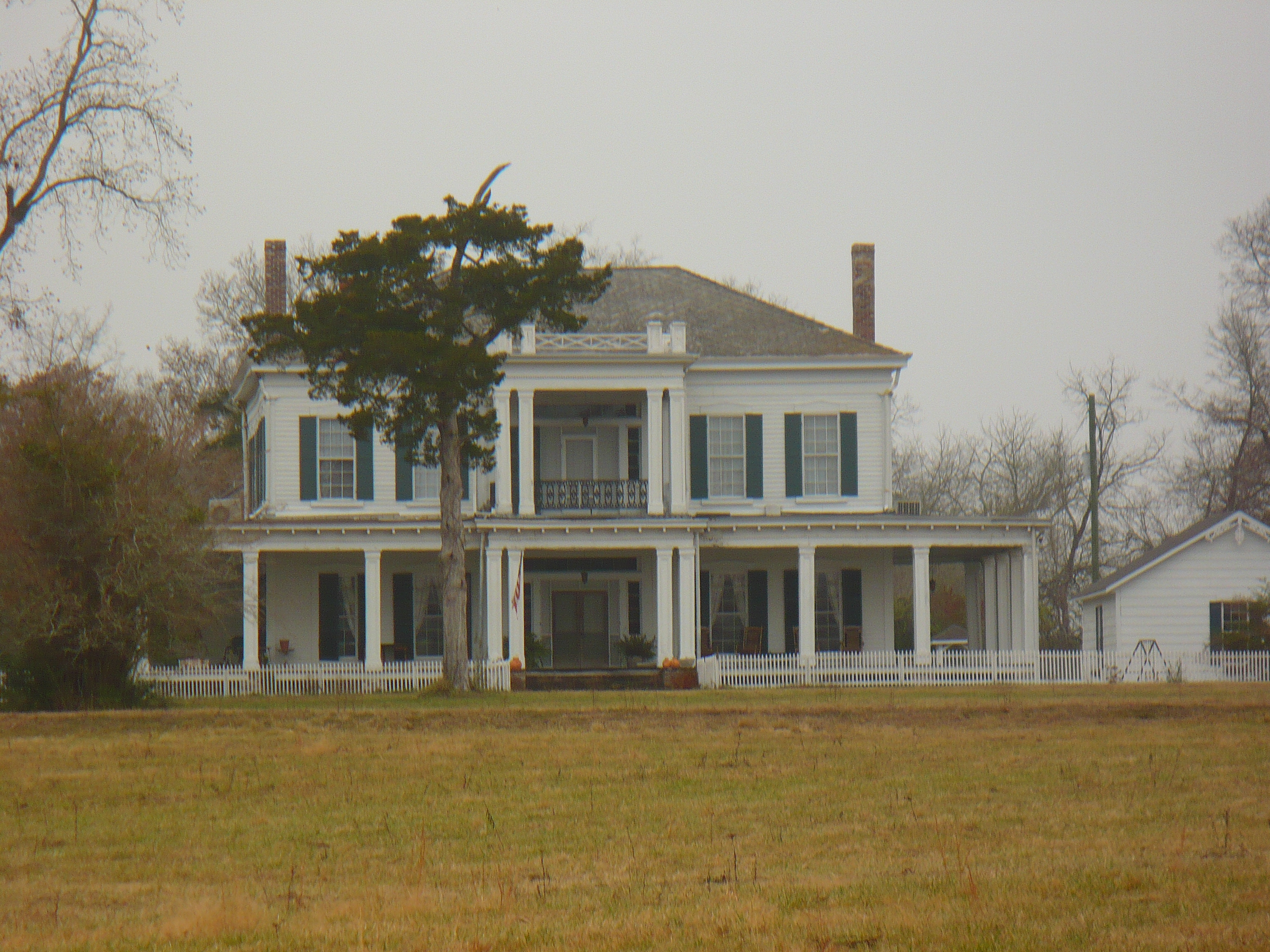
- Cedar Grove in 2008

- Location within Alabama Location within the United States
- Location: near Faunsdale, Alabama, United States
- Coordinates: 32°26′52.28″N 87°34′32.80″W
- Built: 1848
- Architectural style: Greek Revival
- MPS: Plantation Houses of the Alabama Canebrake and Their Associated Outbuildings Multiple Property Submission
- NRHP reference No.: 93000599
- Added to NRHP: 13 July 1993

Cedar Grove Plantation, also known as the Charles Walker House, is a Greek Revival plantation house located near Faunsdale, Alabama. It is notable in having been the residence of Nicola Marschall for a brief period while the Walker family owned the property. The house was added to the National Register of Historic Places on 13 July 1993 as a part of the Plantation Houses of the Alabama Canebrake and Their Associated Outbuildings Multiple Property Submission.

== History ==
The house had its beginnings in 1830 with the construction of a two-story log house by Dougal and Malcolm McAlpin, two brothers from Scotland. In 1848, Charles and Margaret Walker purchased the property and hired a builder from Virginia, Theophilus Fowler, to begin construction of the main house. The house served as the center of the large plantation, Charles Walker owned 154 slaves in 1860. The former log house is believed to have been incorporated into the main house to become the dining room and a bedroom. The house remained under construction until 1858.

Nicola Marschall was a friend of the Walker family and lived with them briefly at their home. The two-story schoolhouse behind the main house is believed to have been used by him as a studio during his time there. This schoolhouse served as a school for children in the area until 1925. The house remained in the Walker family until 1982.

== Description ==
The house is a two-story frame structure with a gabled roof and double veranda. It is built in a vernacular Greek Revival style. The original porch was altered in 1915 from a one-story design with simple turned wooden columns, spanned by arched latticework, to the multi-level configuration with paneled box columns seen today.

== Gallery ==
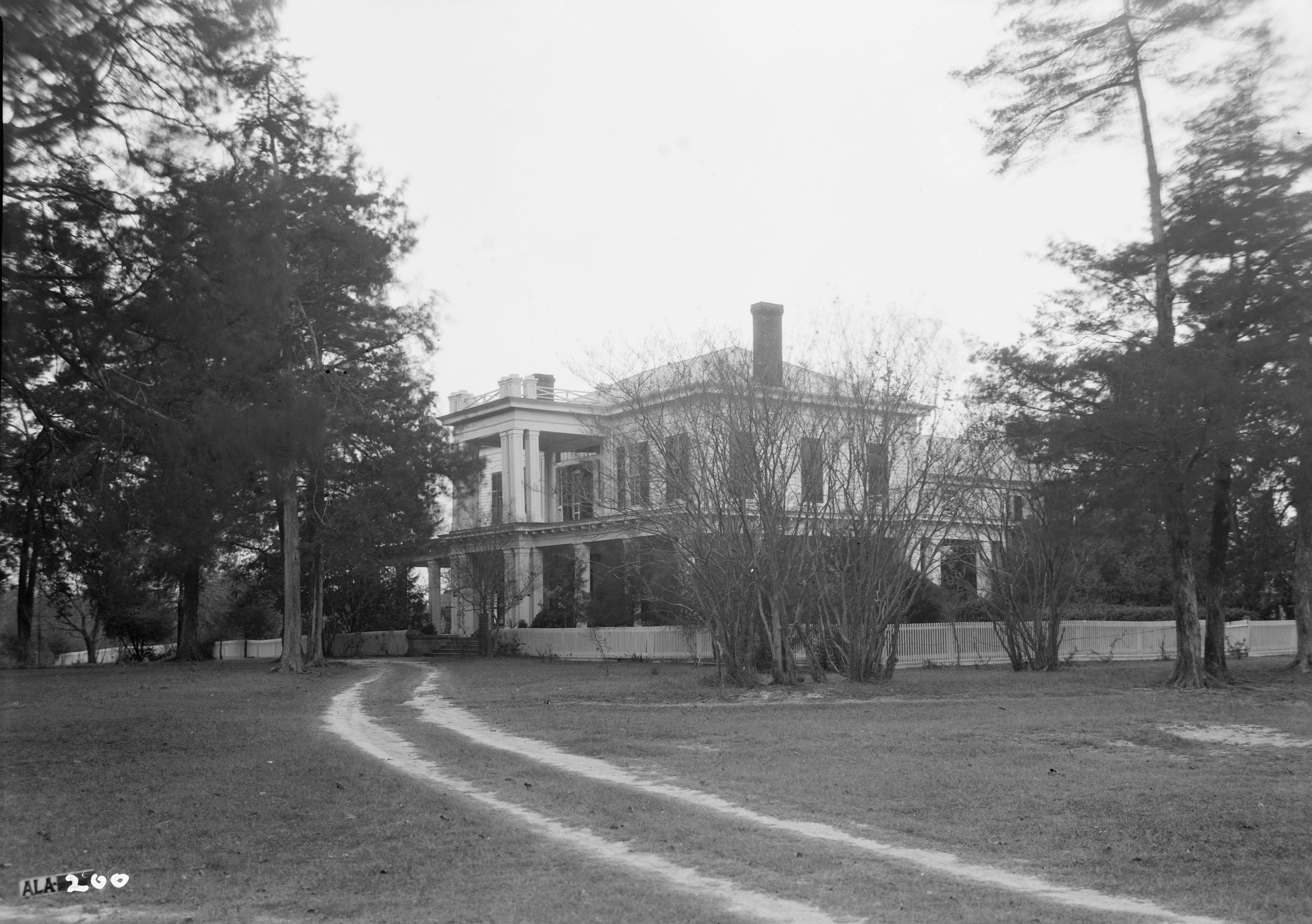
Front and side elevation in 1936

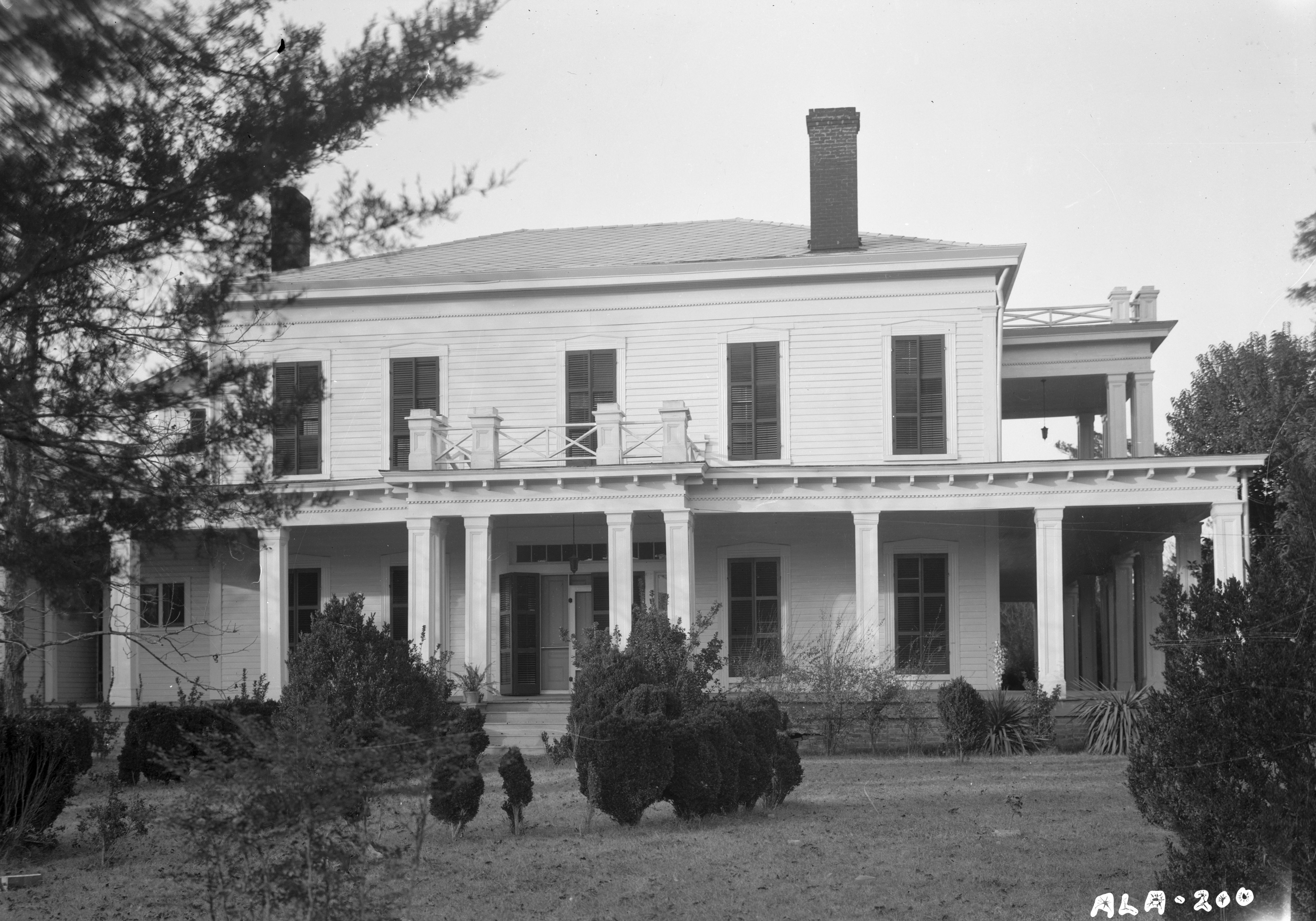
South elevation, side view of house in 1936

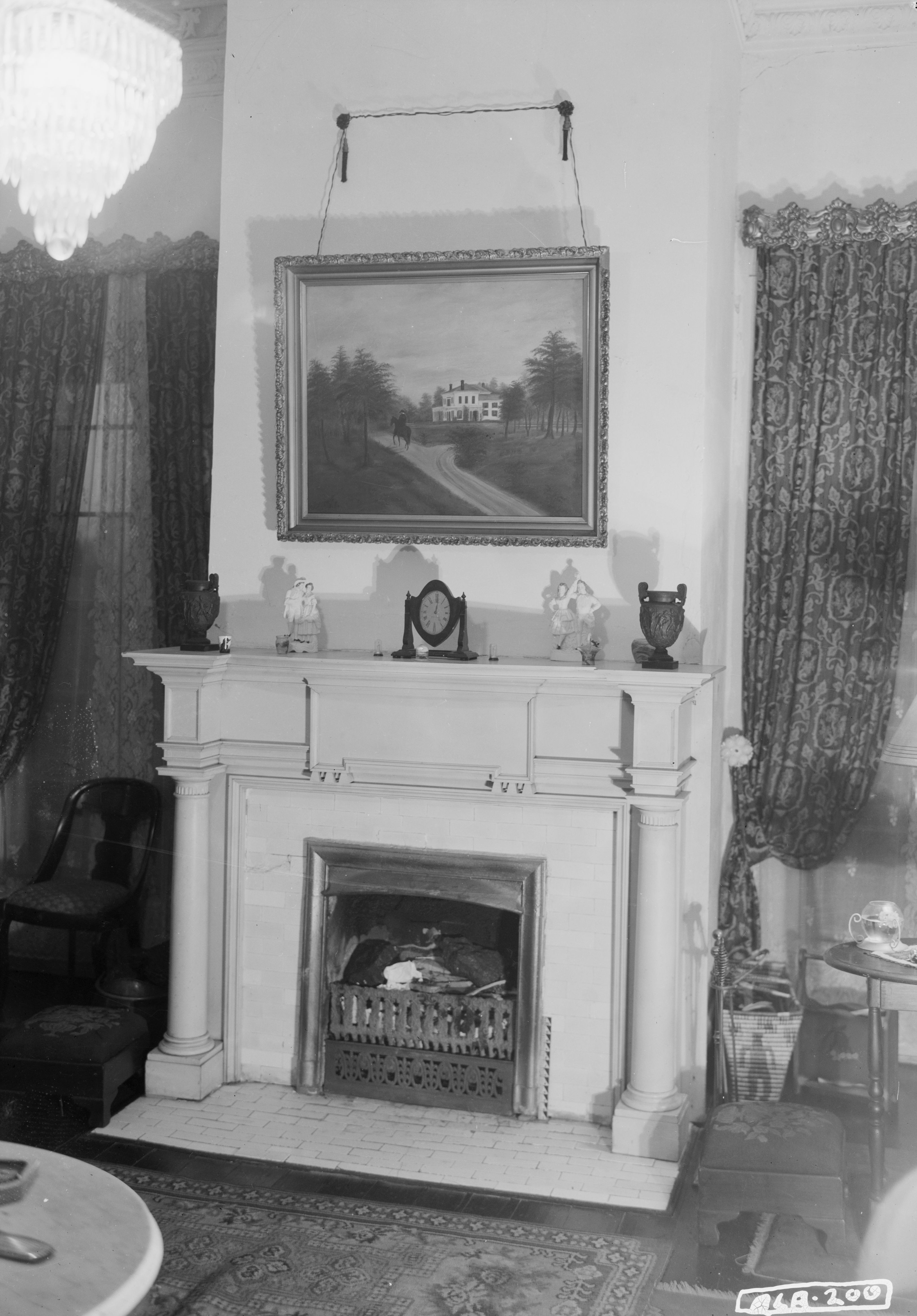
Living room mantel in 1936

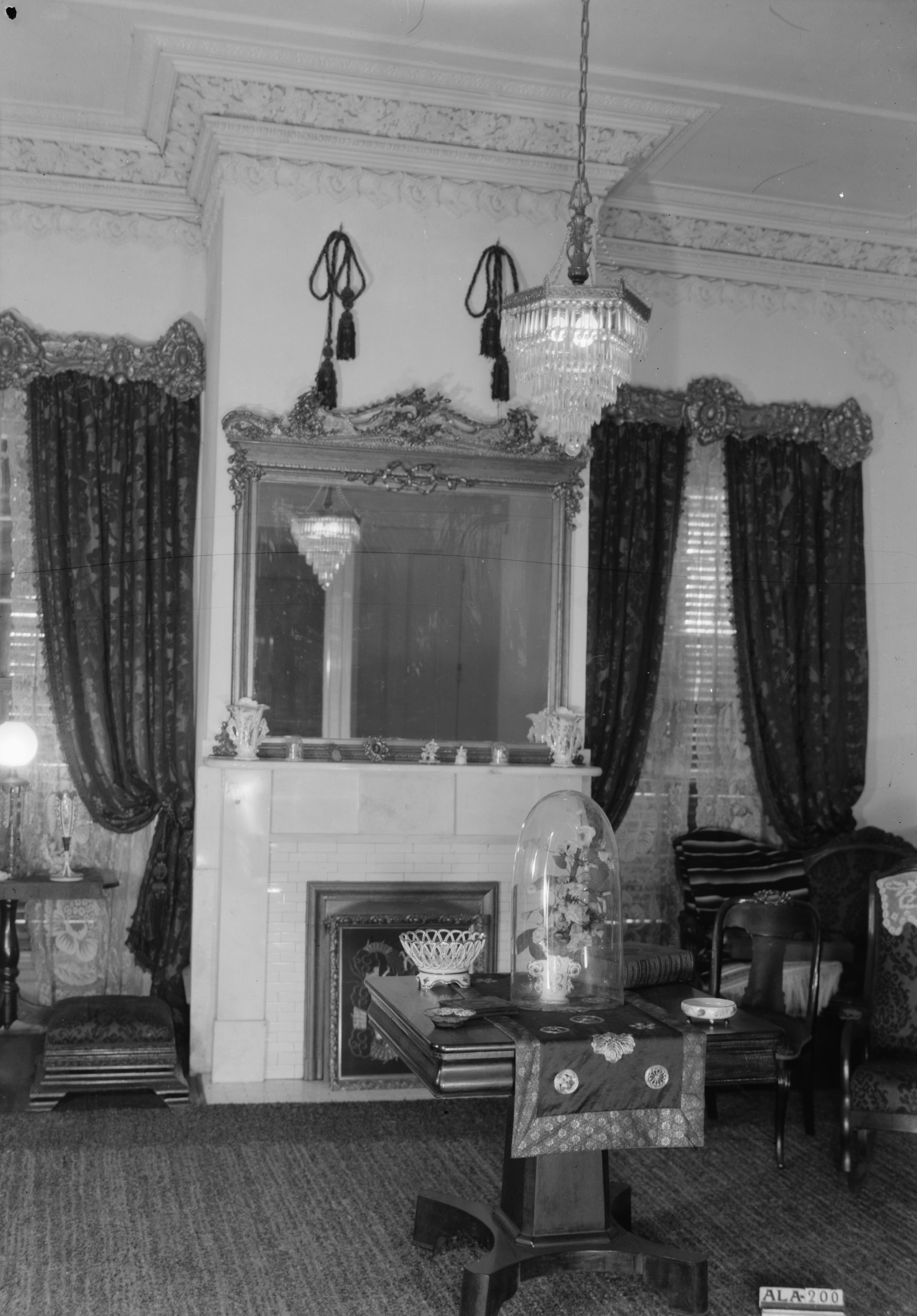
First floor parlor in 1936
