= Riverdale (Selma, Alabama) =

Historic house in Alabama, United States

- U.S. National Register of Historic Places
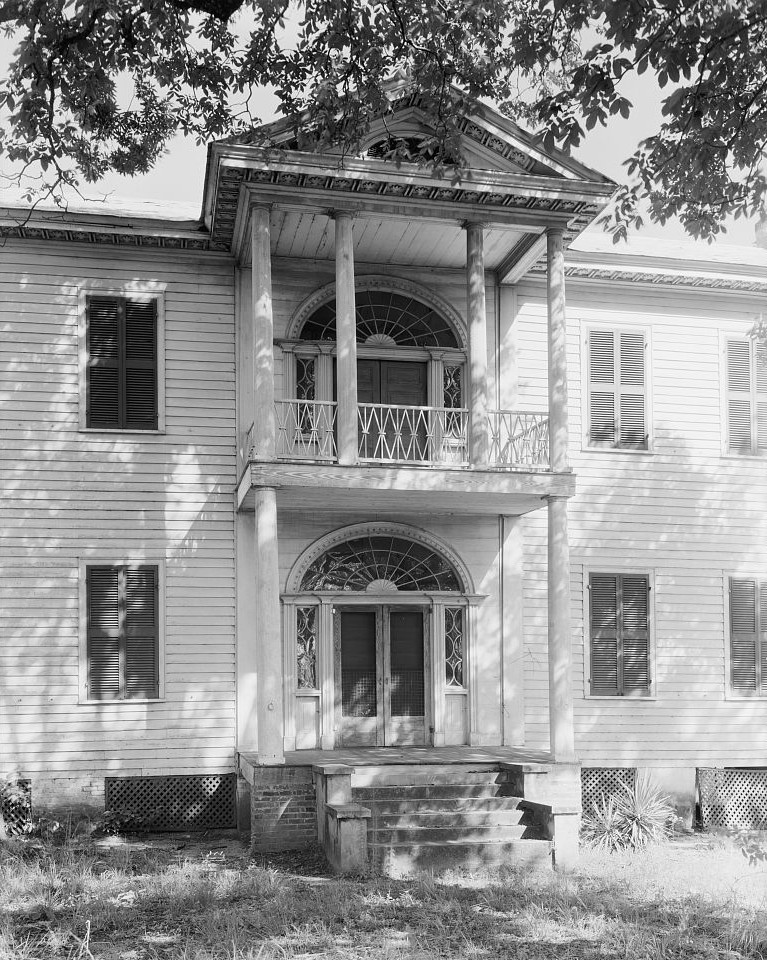
- Riverdale in 1939.

- Location within Alabama Location within the United States
- Nearest city: Selma, Alabama
- Coordinates: 32°26′2″N 86°52′11″W
- Area: 2.3 acres (0.93 ha)
- Built: 1829
- Architectural style: Federal
- NRHP reference No.: 79000384
- Added to NRHP: September 10, 1979

Riverdale is a historic plantation house near Selma, Alabama, United States. Architectural historians consider it to be the "most elegant and refined house of its period in Dallas County." The two-story wood-frame house was built in the Federal-style in 1829. It is five bays wide, with a two-tiered, pedimented portico spanning the central bay. It was built by Virgil H. Gardner, a native of Jones County, Georgia, for his bride, Margaret Loise Aylett of Virginia. Their daughter, Mary Gardner, was married in the house in 1854 to Henry Quitman, son of former Mississippi governor John A. Quitman.

Following the deaths of Virgil and Margaret Gardner during the 1880s, the plantation was purchased by W. P. Watts. Houston Alexander sold the house and roughly 1,500 acres (610 ha) of the property in 1961 to the Hammermill Paper Company. The company offered to donate the house to the local historical society on the condition that it be moved. The former plantation site is now the location of International Paper's Riverdale Mill, built in 1965. The house was added to the National Register of Historic Places on September 10, 1979. It was disassembled and moved during the 1980s to a site off Alabama State Route 22.
