= Henry Augustine Tayloe =

American planter, slaveholder and horse breeder

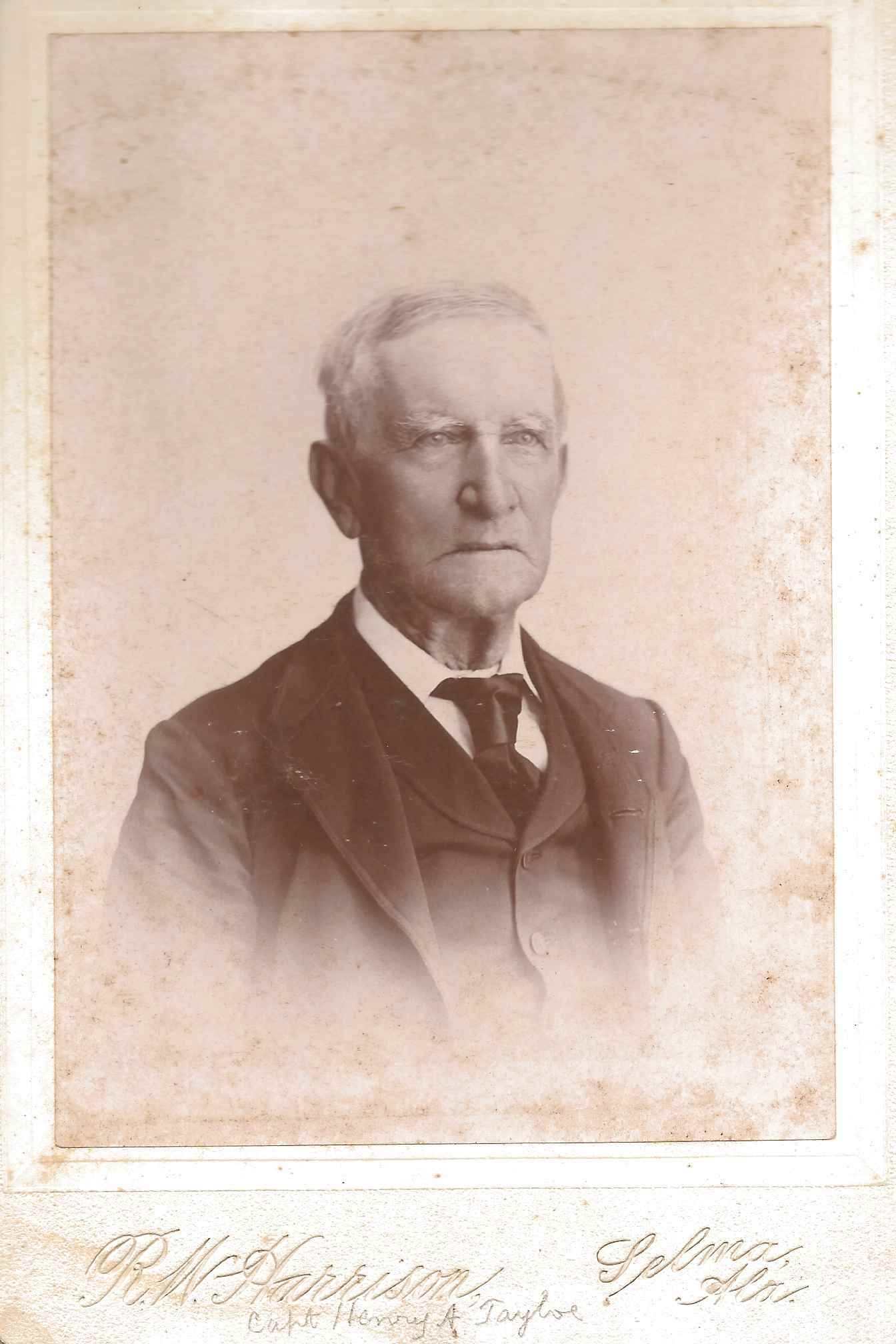
- Henry Augustine Tayloe I, son of John Tayloe III
- Born: April 8, 1808; The Octagon House, Washington, DC, built by John Tayloe III
- Died: July 15, 1903 (aged 95); Prairieville, Alabama
- Occupation: Planter
- Known for: Founder Fair Grounds Race Course, Builder St. Andrew's Episcopal Church, Founder Faunsdale Plantation

Henry Augustine Tayloe (April 8, 1808 – July 15, 1903) of Oakley Plantation, Essex County, Virginia, later Gallion, Canebrake, Alabama, was an American planter, slaveholder, horse breeder and racer, and land speculator in the 19th century.

A younger son of John Tayloe III of The Octagon House and Mount Airy, a wealthy planter in Washington, D.C., Virginia, and Maryland; after living in Maryland for a time after graduating from UVA the young Tayloe went to Alabama in 1834, where he was among the pioneers in developing slave labor cotton plantations in the Canebrake region. He also acted as a land agent, acquiring numerous plantations in the area for investment by his four older brothers, who were also extremely wealthy. A committed breeder and racer of horses, in 1838 he founded the Fair Grounds Race Course near New Orleans with Bernard de Marigny. He had St. Andrew's Episcopal Church (1853) built in Prairieville with enslaved labor. He later founded the town of Faunsdale, Alabama, named after a nearby plantation.

== Birth ==
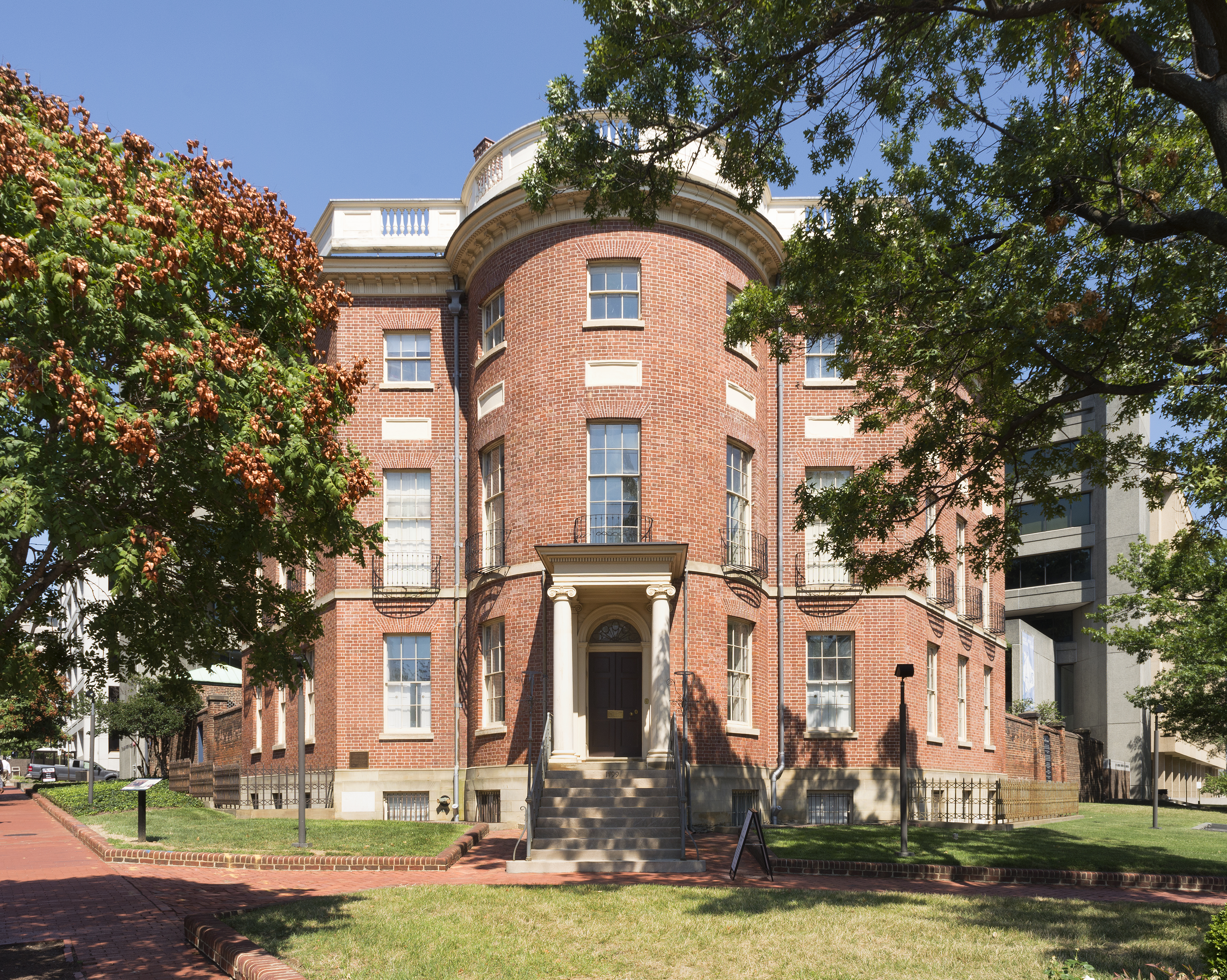
The Octagon House

Tayloe was born on April 8, 1808, at The Octagon House, the third youngest son, after George Plater Tayloe and before Charles Tayloe, of John Tayloe III and his wife, the former Ann Ogle, daughter of Benjamin Ogle. His father had commissioned the construction of The Octagon, the Tayloe’s city residence, in Washington, D.C. The boy was named in part named for his uncle, Captain William Augustine Washington, son of Augustine Washington Jr., a nephew of George Washington, and Anne Aylett. Tayloe's father had inherited the vast colonial estate Mount Airy in Richmond County, Virginia, developed by his own father Colonel John Tayloe II, and other plantations in multiple counties in Virginia and Maryland. John Tayloe II and John Tayloe III were the wealthiest plantation owners in the state of Virginia, Virginia being the wealthiest colony, for their generations. Tayloe's maternal grandfather was Benjamin Ogle, ninth governor of Maryland, and great-grandfather was former Provincial governor, Samuel Ogle.

== Schooling ==
As a youth, Tayloe asked John C. Calhoun, then Secretary of War, to support him for an appointment to West Point. Noting Tayloe was the son of a rich man, Calhoun advised him to leave such an appointment open to a boy who needed government aid in his education. Tayloe entered the University of Virginia.

== Career ==
After graduating, Tayloe took on management as a planter and slaveholder at property in Maryland. He also became involved in raising thoroughbred horses for racing. His horses sometimes competed against those of President Andrew Jackson. Tayloe raced his horses himself.

Tayloe lived with his parents at The Octagon House and on his farm until 1834. He moved that year to the Canebrake region of Alabama, buying his own land and working as a land agent for his four brothers. They invested in several plantations each, in land recently ceded by the indigenous Creek people. President Jackson had been conducting Indian Removal in the Southeast since 1830, when Congress approved it. Tayloe transported many enslaved African-American workers from his family's Virginia and Maryland plantations to Alabama. As the Deep South was developed for plantations, an estimated total of one million enslaved persons were forcibly transported there, breaking up numerous families.

Tayloe bought a number of plantations, Oakland near Uniontown, "Woodville" (now Faunsdale Plantation), Walnut Grove, Windsor, and perhaps others. Windsor was for his brother, Benjamin Ogle Tayloe, who lived in Washington. After the payments had been completed, the titles were proved defective, and the sum had to be repaid.

At Walnut Grove Tayloe built a frame residence of eight rooms, one of the first large homes in the area. He also brought racing stock to Alabama from among his and his brothers' thoroughbred horses. A mile track was laid off near Prairieville for training uses. He entered his horses in races at the Greensboro track, Livingston, Mobile and Montgomery, Alabama; Columbus, Georgia; and New Orleans, Louisiana. His brother William Henry Tayloe, heir to Mount Airy in Virginia, sent fourteen racehorses to him at one consignment. They traveled overland. One was "Robin Hood", brother of a great Boston (horse).

Tayloe entered his mare, "Black Maria", to race at the Metairie course, just outside New Orleans. The mare was one of four in a four-mile heat race. Black Maria and two others each won one heat of four miles (each heat was four miles). One of these three winners had to win the fourth heat in order to claim the stake. Black Maria won the deciding fourth heat, the same afternoon, thus having run a total of 16 miles. She won the sixteenth mile in 2:08 minutes. Tayloe eventually went bankrupt, but his brothers restored his fortune. He lived in comfort on his plantation, "New Hope", past his ninetieth year.

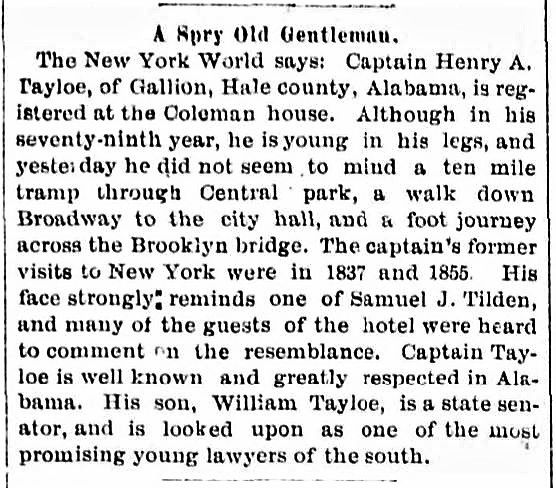
Henry A. Tayloe, Travel Announcement to New York City, New York, 1887

Tayloe served as Secretary of the Alabama Diocesan Episcopal Convention. He was appointed to canvass the State to build up a Bishop's Fund, at which he was successful.

== Family ==
Tayloe married a Miss Jemison. They had five children together: four daughters, who each married, and a son who became an attorney and judge in Alabama. Daughter Anne married R. L. Maupin, a Confederate veteran and Adjutant General of the Missouri Brigade. He later served as Probate Judge of Marengo County. Virginia married a young man from New Orleans. Narcissa married a son of Alfred Hatch Place at Arcola. The youngest daughter married Mr. Shivers of Marion, Alabama. Son William H. Tayloe was elected and served as an Alabama State Senator and later as Chancellor of Alabama.

== Horse Racing ==
=== 1832 ===
Henry entered his first recorded race the first day of fall races at The Fairfield Race Course in Richmond, Virginia, on the third Tuesday in October with his horse Cornelia

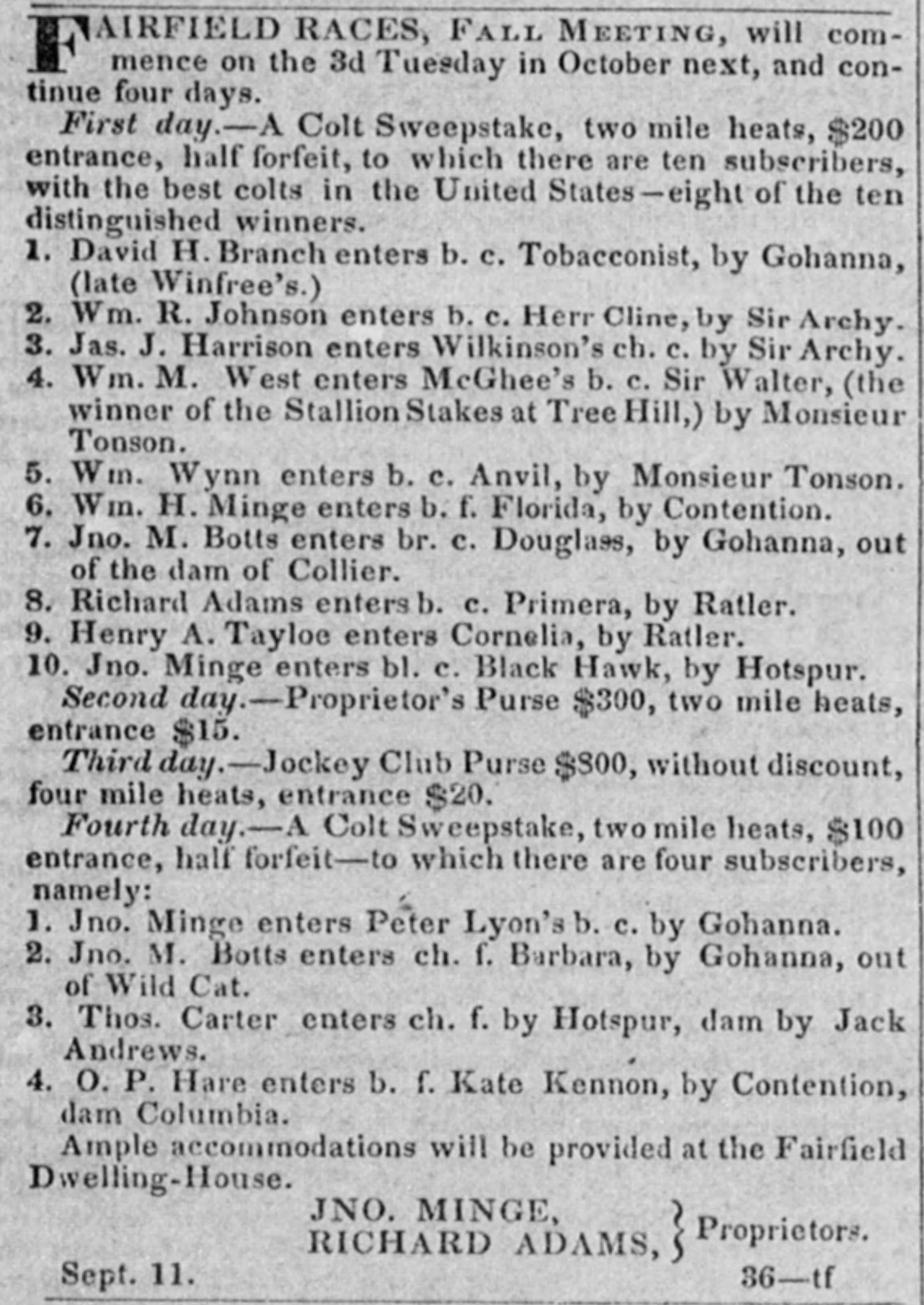
Fairfield Race Track Richmond Fall Meeting 1832 Virginia Richmond Enquirer Tue Sep 11 1832

in a race against: David H. Branch's, member Virginia Senate, Tabacconist; William R. Johnson's, member Virginia Senate, Herr Cline, James Harrison's, of Brunswick, Virginia, Wilkinson by Sir Archy; William M. West's McGhee's; William Wynn's Anvil; William H. Minge's Florida; John M. Bott's Douglass; and Dr. John Minge's Blackhawk. Later that fall/winter at The Tree Hill Race Course in Richmond, Virginia, it was reported in the Alexandria Gazette on November 20, 1832, Henry A. Tayloe's Tichicus, raced against Virginia Sen. William R. Johnson's Annette, Isham Puckett's Dismal, and John M. Bott's Betsy Graves. On the third day, Henry's Pizarro raced against: John P. White's Collier, Thomas Doswell's Lady Pest, and James Harrison's Goliath

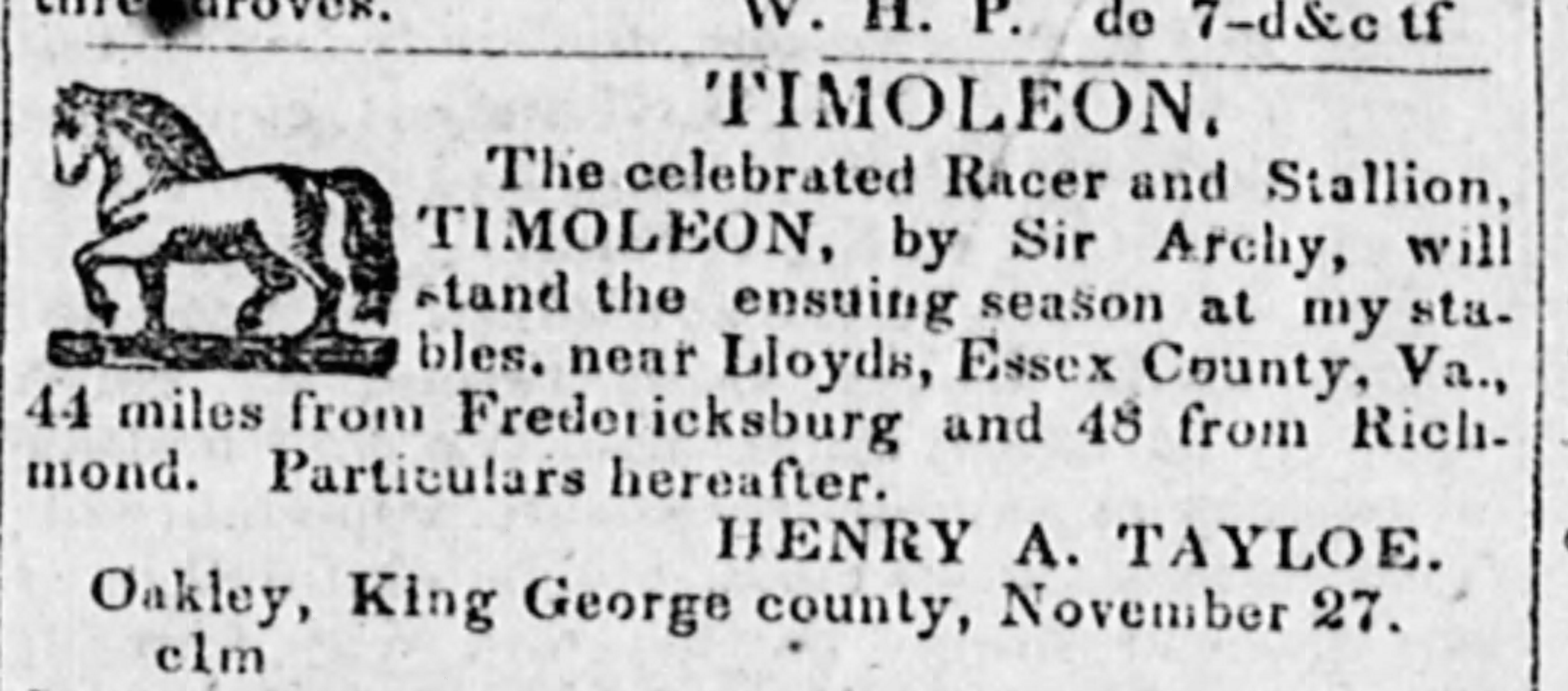
Timoleon Henry A Tayloe Constitutional Whig Fri Dec 14 1832

Finally Tayloe advertised in the Constitutional Whig December 14, 1832: Timoleon (horse), by Sir Archy,

"will stand the ensuing season at my stables near Lloyd's, Essex County, Virginia, from his plantation Oakley, King George County(should read Essex, County), Virginia.

=== 1833 ===
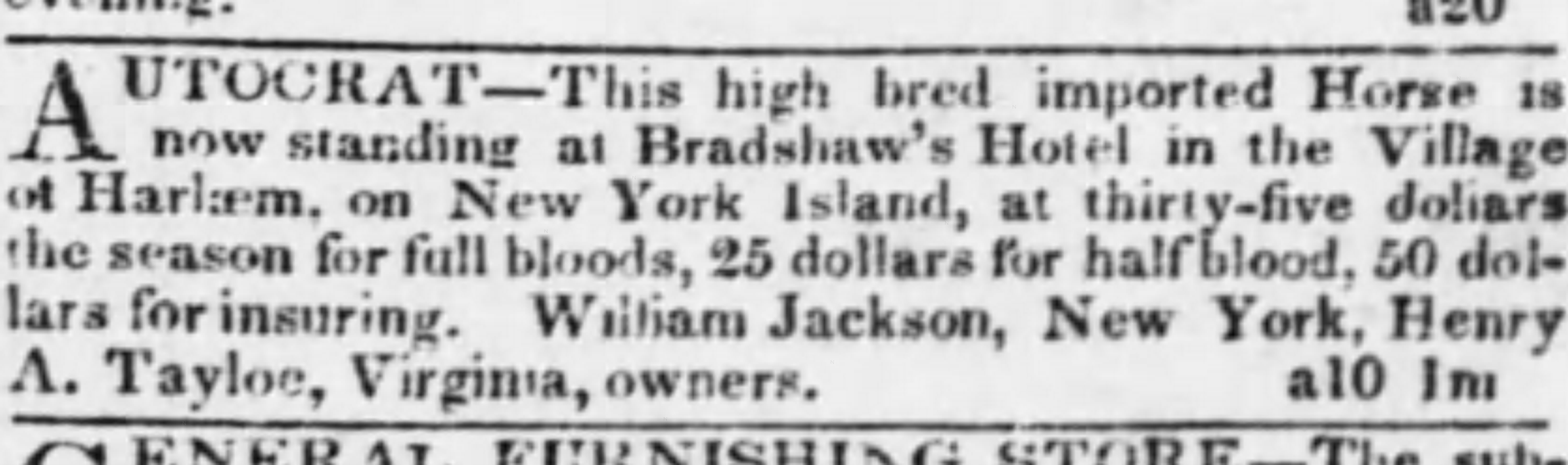
Henry Augustine Tayloe Autocrat Stud Services The Evening Post Mon Apr 22 1833

Tayloe began the year subscribing to a Sweepstakes Race at The Central Race Course in Baltimore, Maryland, against: John M. Botts, Edward Parker, William R. Johnson, William Wynn, R.F. Stockton, Robert L. Stevens, and James M. Selden.

In April he advertised in The Evening Post stud services for Autocrat,

"bred by Edward Smith-Stanley, 14th Earl of Derby, and imported into New York in 1831 by William Jackson. Owned by Tayloe & Tayloe of Virginia he stood in 1836 at Thomas Barry's, in 1837 at R. C. Dickinson's in Montgomery County, and was then sold to Colonel Samuel Lyne of Montgomery County, where he stood there in 1839. He was said to be 16.2 hands. Autocrat sired 29 winners of 33 races between 1838 and 1843."

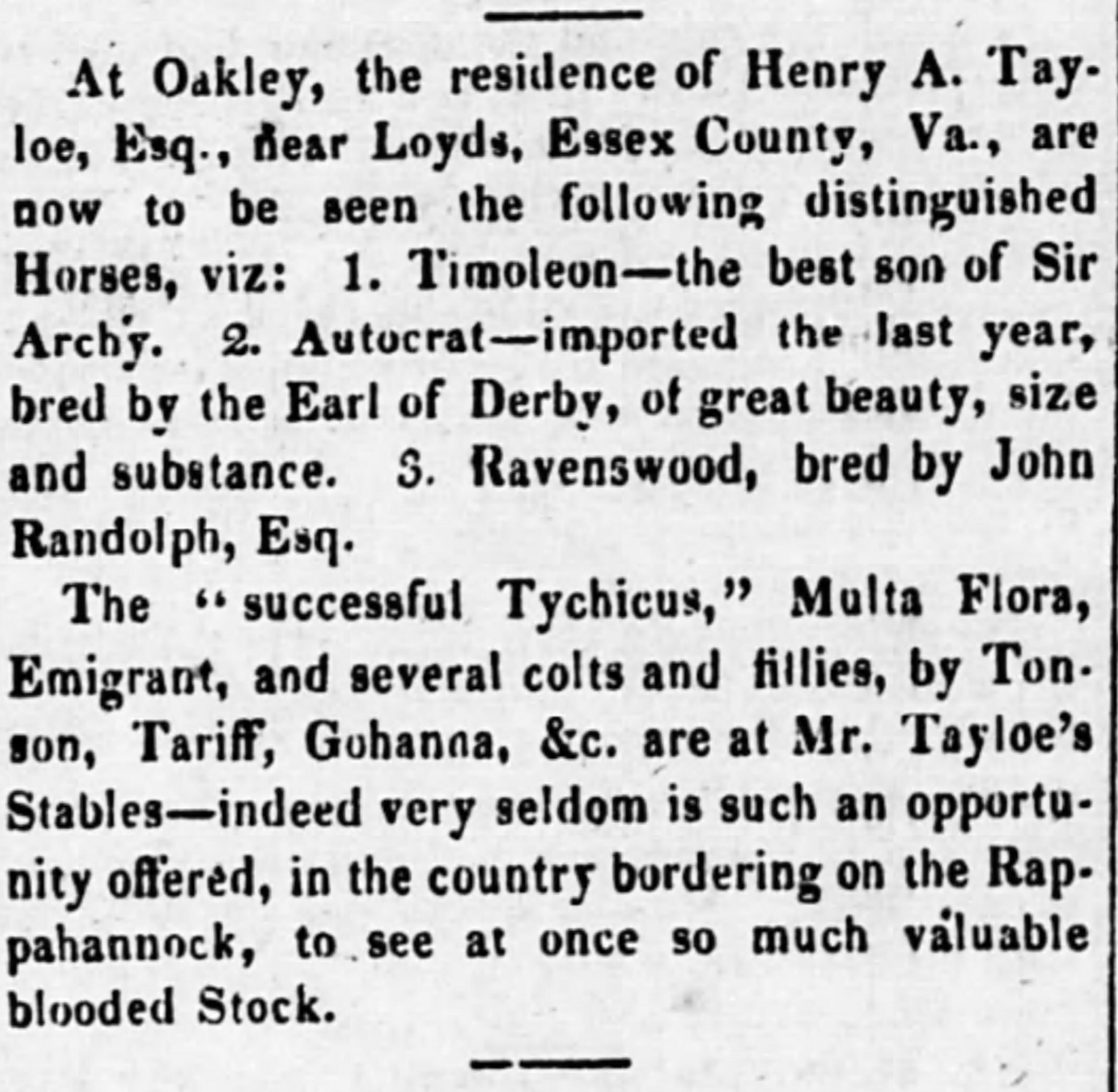
Thoroughbred Stud and Sales Henry A Tayloe Oakley Essex Co VA Phenix Gazette Thu Aug 15 1833

In May he raced Tichicus and lost to William R. Johnson's Flying Dutchman, John C. Good's Tuscumbia was disqualified, on the Third Day of the Spring Races at The Broad Rock Race Course in Richmond, Virginia.

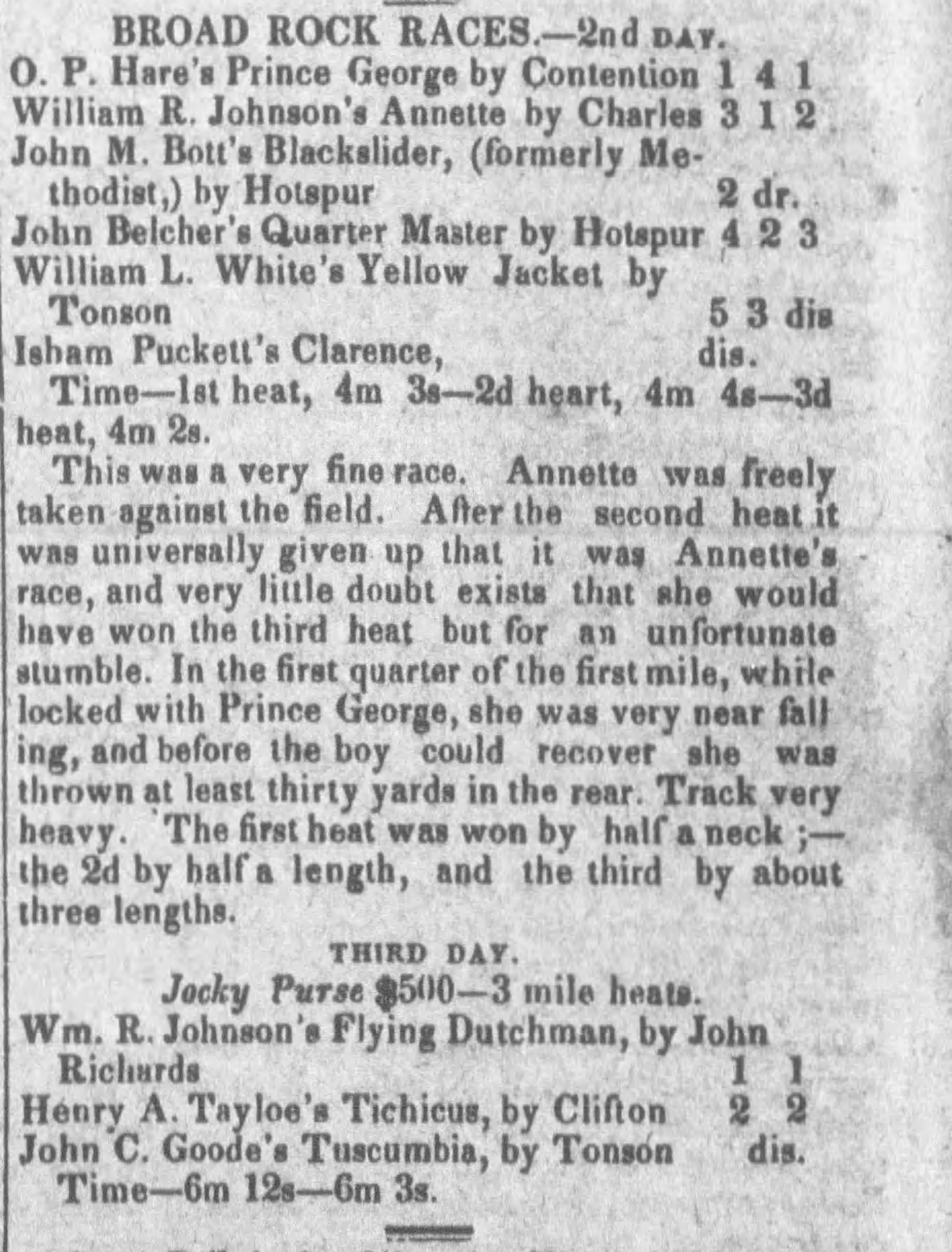
Broad Rock Race Course Richmond Virginia Spring 1833 National Banner and Nashville Daily Advertiser Wed May 8, 1833

In August he again advertised in the Alexandria Gazette the sale of thoroughbred horses and stud services. On October 15, 1833, he was again at The Central Race Course in Baltimore, Maryland, proprietor J.M Selden, during the Fall Races, subscribed to Sweepstakes Race, $500 Entrance Fee, racing Emily Tonson against: William R. Johnson's sister of Her Cline, C.S.W. Dorsey's Unnamed, Edward Parker's full brother to Pilot, J.M. Bott's Gohanna colt, James M. Selden's Unnamed, William Wynn's full brother to Anvil, R.F. Stockton, a Monsieur Tonson colt, R.L. Steven's Henry, A.P. Hamlin's Unnamed, and R. Gilmer's Cadet.

=== 1838 ===
==== Fair Grounds Racecoure ====
Henry A Tayloe founded the "Louisiana Race Course", now the Fair Grounds Race Course near New Orleans, with Julius C Branch and Bernard de Marigny. Tayloe's father, John Tayloe III was a leading turfman, founder of the Washington Jockey Club (1797); who imported the notable English Thoroughbred Diomed who sired Sir Archy, whose progeny include Lexington, Secretariat, and American Pharoah; grandson of John Tayloe II who imported Childers (by Flying Childers), Jenny Cameron and Jolly Rogers (three of the most important colonial imports) and who built the grand colonial estate and stud farm Mount Airy) and organized the first races in 1838.

On April 10, 1838, the first race for "The Creole Purse" of $1,000, (~$30,234 in 2025) free only for horses bred and owned in the state of Louisiana. These were mile heats. The horses were handicapped at different weights related to their ages: two year olds a feather; three year olds 86lbs; four year olds, 100lbs; five year olds, 110lbs; six year olds, 118lbs; aged, 124lbs. An allowance of three pounds was given to mares and geldings.

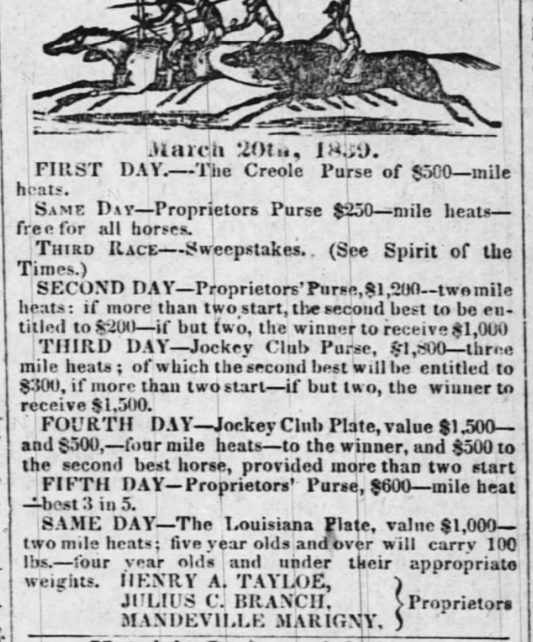
Times Picayune Ad, March 13, 1839

- First Day, First Race - owners and horses: Fergus Duplantier, Louisianese; John F Miller, Lord of the Isles; Robert J Barrows, Tom Jones; Y.N. Oliver, Pocohantas; Sosthene Allian, Tresorrier.
  - Second Race, sweepstakes for three-year-olds, weights as before, five subscribers at $1000 each, $250 forfeit, mile heats. Owners and horses: William J Minor, Britiania; Thos. J Wells, Taglioni; John F Miller, John Boy; Henry Augustine Tayloe, Tom Thurman; Col Robert Smith, Lavinia.
- Second day, first race, purse $1,200, entrance $120, free for all ages, weights as before, two mile heats. Owners and horses: Minor Kenner, Richard of York; A Barrows, Louisa Bascombe; Fergus Duplantier, Wren.
- Third day, purse $1,800, entrance $180, free for all ages, weights as before, three mile heats. Owners and horses: Wm. R Barrow, Pressure, Thos. J Wells, Dick Chin; J. S. Garrison, Pollard; John Randolph Grymes, Susan Yandall; Robert Smith, Pete Whetstone.
- Fourth day "Creole Plate" (as seen in the picture), valued at $1,000. Entrance $100, five year olds and over to carry 100lbs; four year olds and under their appropriate weights, two mile heats. Owners and horses: Adam Lewis Bingaman, Angora; Henry Augustine Tayloe, Hortense.

=== 1839 ===
The second-year spring races started on March 20, 1839, and lasted for five days. "The First Day was the "Creole Purse" for $500, one mile heats; the same day the "Proprietors Purse" for $250, one mile heats; and third race "Sweepstakes" (See Spirit of Times). Second Day-"Proprietors Purse" $1,200—two mile heat; if more than two start the second best to be entitled to $200-but if two, the winner to receive $1,000. Third Day-"Jockey Club Purse" $1,800—three mile heats; of which the second best will be entitled to $300, if more than two start-if but two, the winner to receive $1500. Fourth Day-"Jockey Club Plate" value $1,500 and $500, -four mile heats-to the winner, and $500 to the second best horse, provided more than two start. Fifth Day-"Proprietors Purse" $600—mile heat-best 3 in 5; Same Day-"The Louisiana Plate" value $1,000—two mile heats; five year olds and over will carry 100lbs.- four year olds and under their appropriate weight."

=== Gallery ===
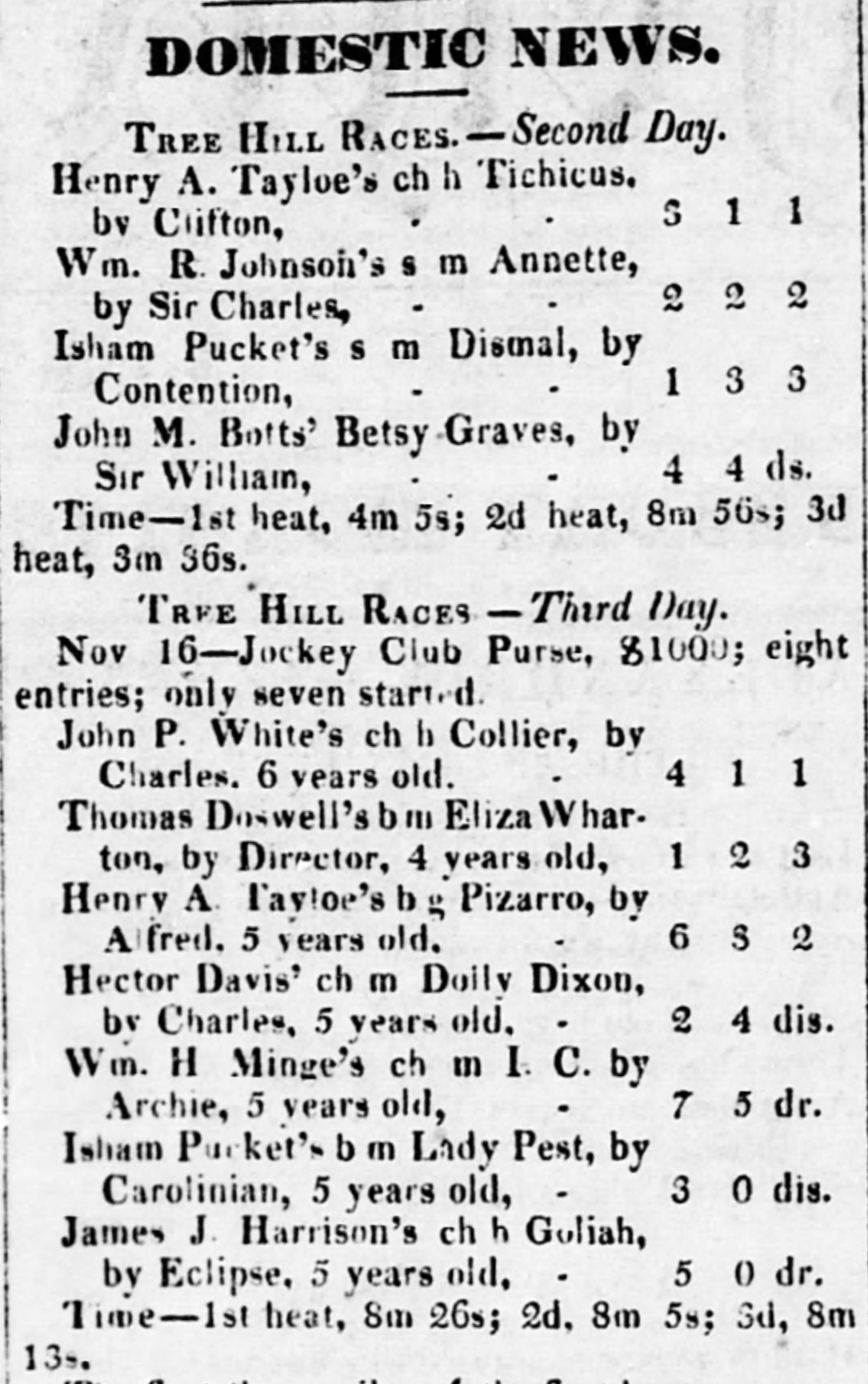
The Tree Hill Race Course Alexandria Virginia Fall Races Day 2 & 3 Alexandria Gazette Tue Nov 20 1832

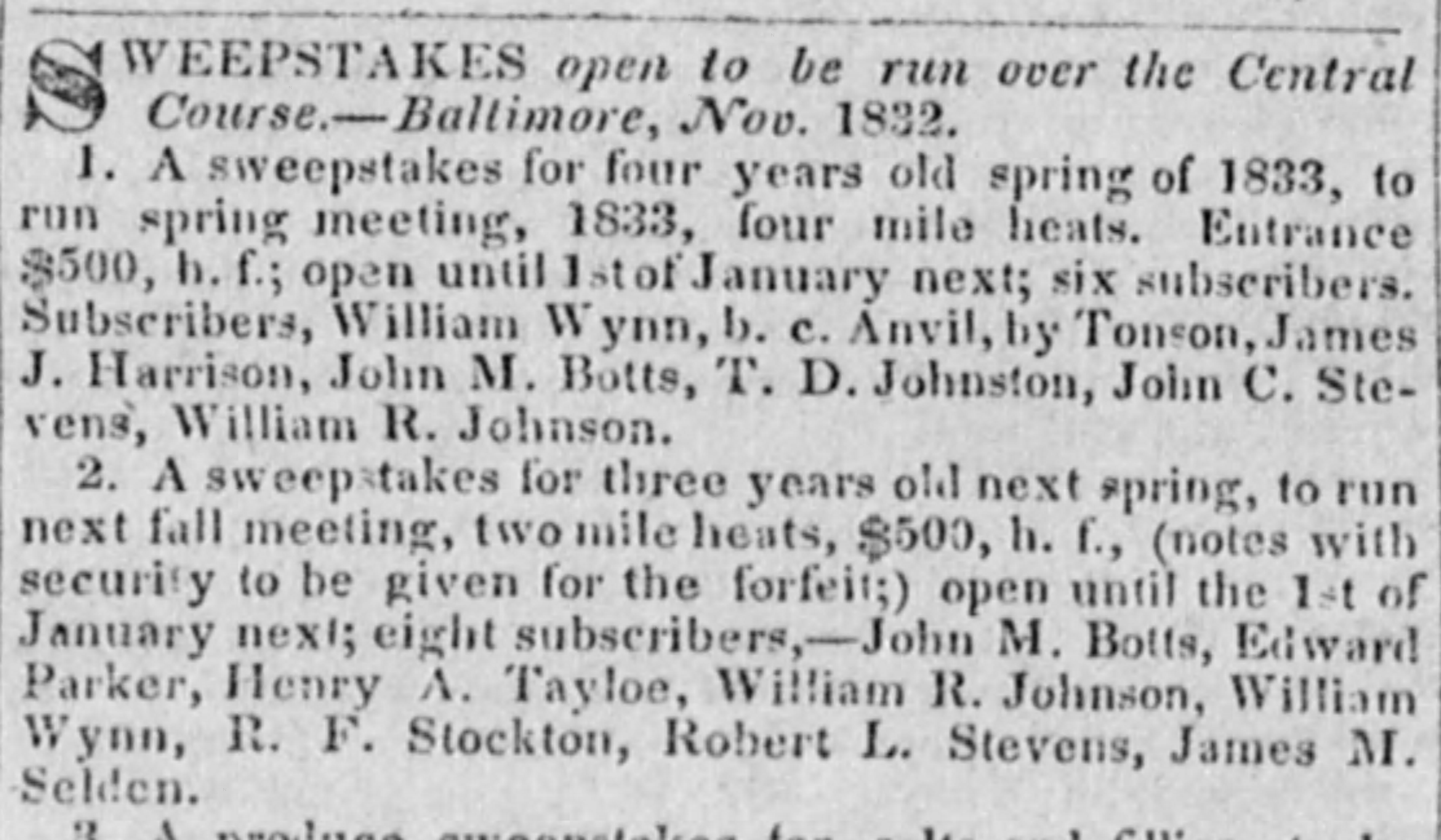
Central Race Course Spring Meet Baltimore Maryland Richmond Enquirer Tue Dec 11 1832

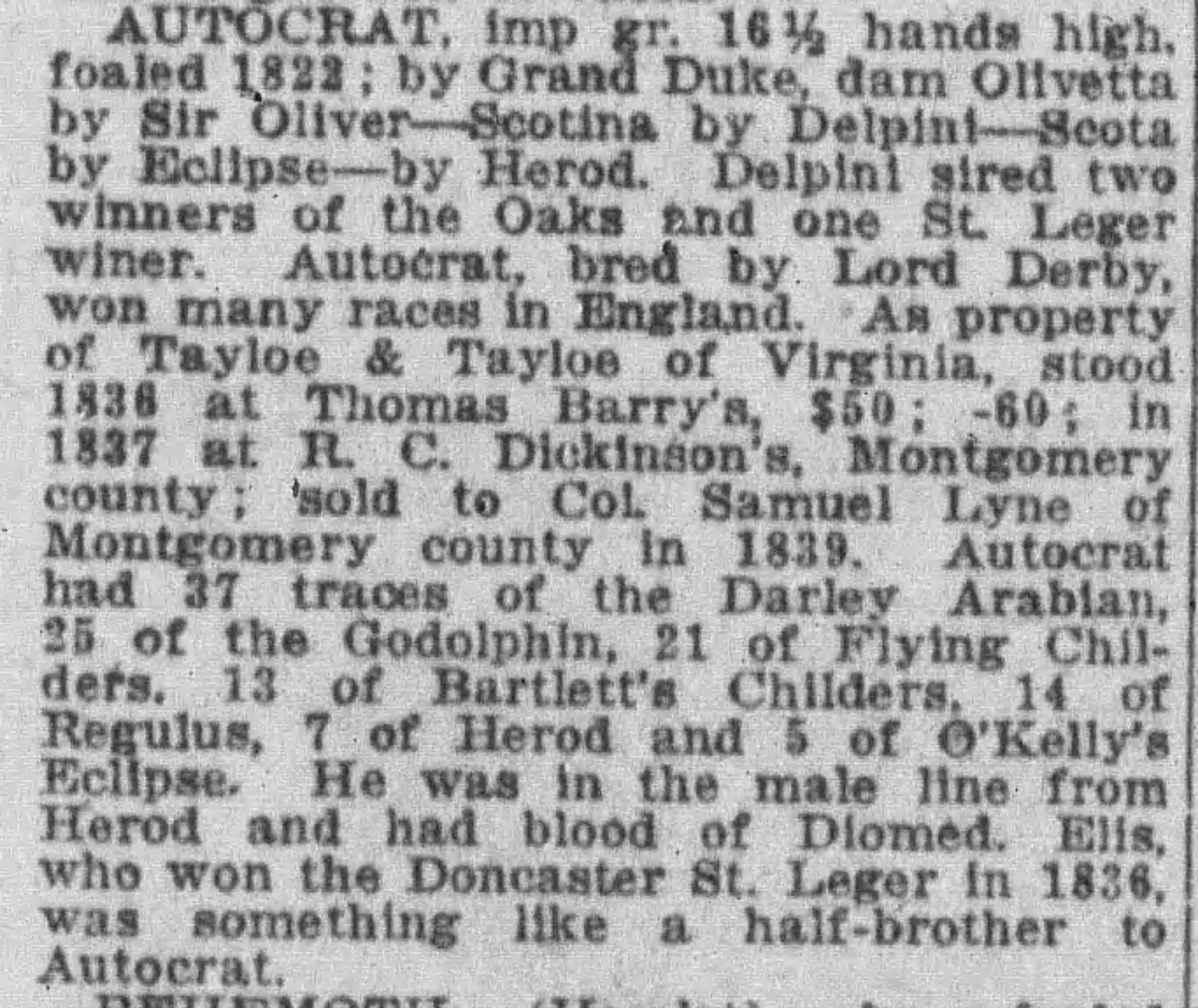
Autocrat Race Horse Tayloe & Tayloe Nashville Banner Sun Jul 25 1920

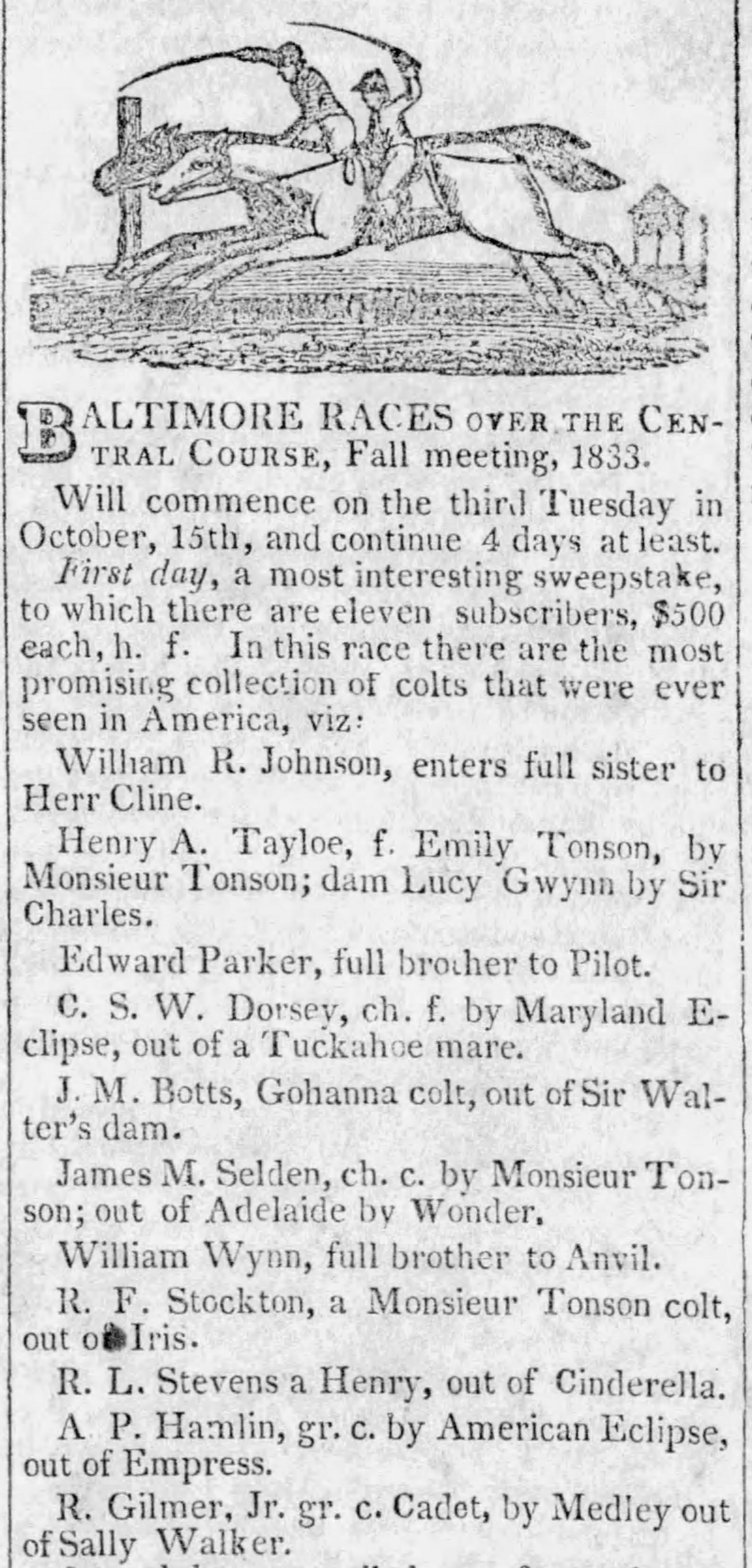
Central Race Course Baltimore Maryland Fall Races 1833 Lancaster Intelligencer and Journal Fri Aug 30 1833

== St. Andrew's Episcopal Church ==
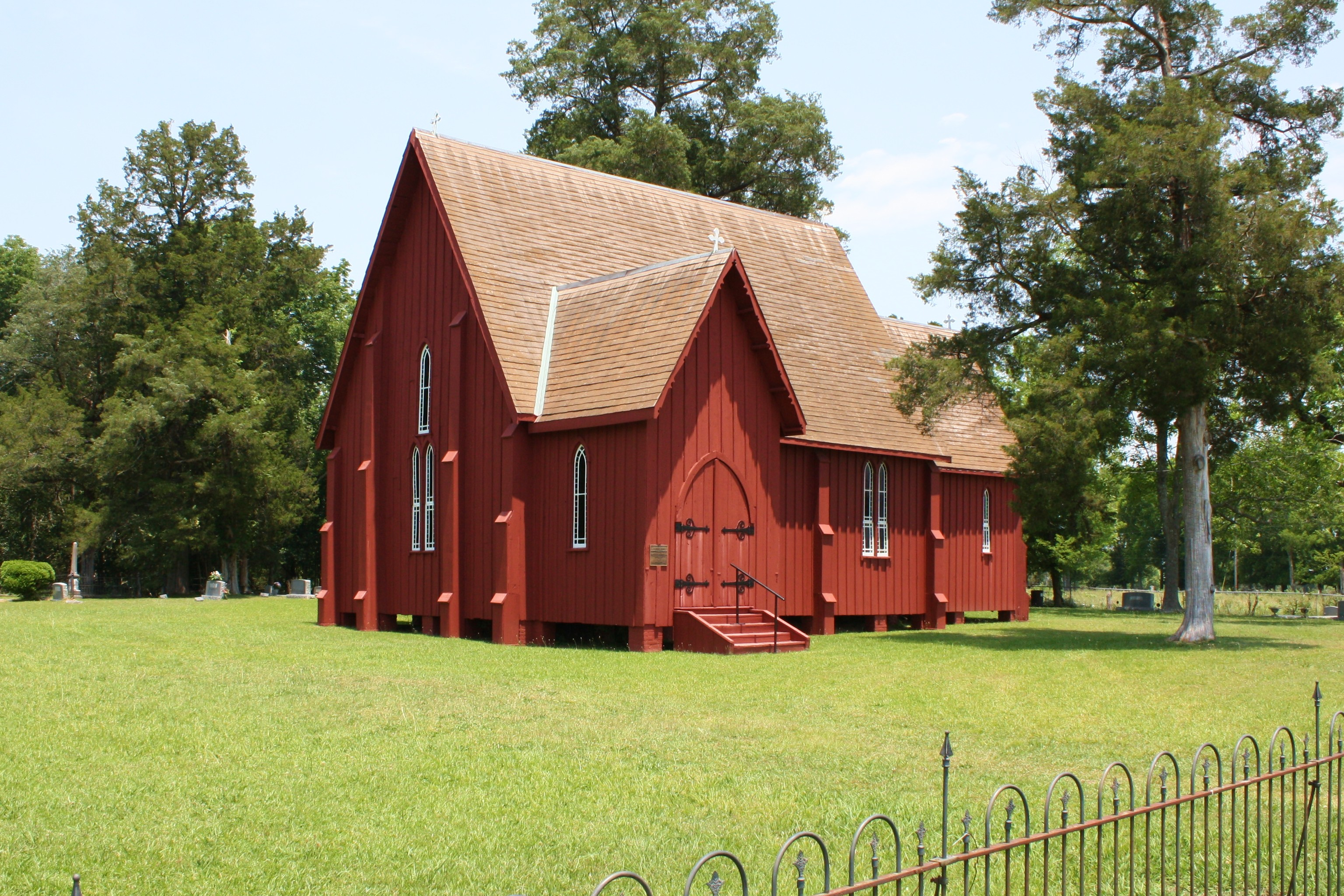
St. Andrew's Episcopal Church

St. Andrew's Episcopal Church (1853), in Prairieville, Alabama, is a small Carpenter Gothic-style church with carpentry work completed by Peter Lee and Joe Glasgow, enslaved people held by H.A. Tayloe of Gallion, Alabama, who also helped build Waldwic. He served as Secretary of the Alabama Diocesan Episcopal Convention. The exterior of the church features wooden buttresses. It appears to have been built from a design in the book Rural Architecture, by architect Richard Upjohn.

== Ancestry ==
Ancestors of Henry Augustine Tayloe

16. William Tayloe (the nephew)
8. Col John Tayloe I
17. Ann Corbin
4. Col John Tayloe II
18. David Gwynn
9. Elizabeth Gwynn
19. Kathrine Griffin
2. Col John Tayloe III
20. George Plater I
10. George Plater II
21. Ann Rousby Burford
5. Rebecca Plater Tayloe
22. Colonel Thomas A. Addison, I
11. Rebecca Addison Bowles
23. Elizabeth Tasker
1. Henry Augustine Tayloe
24. Samuel Ogle
12. Samuel Ogle
25. Ursula Markham
6. Benjamin Ogle
26. Benjamin Tasker Sr.
13. Anne Tasker
27. Ann Bladen
3. Ann Ogle
28. Joseph Hill
14. Henry Hill
29. Sarah Richardson
7. Henrietta Margaret Hill
30. Philip Thomas
15. Mary Thomas
31. Ann Chew
