= Thornhill (Talladega, Alabama) =

Historic house in Alabama, United States

- U.S. National Register of Historic Places
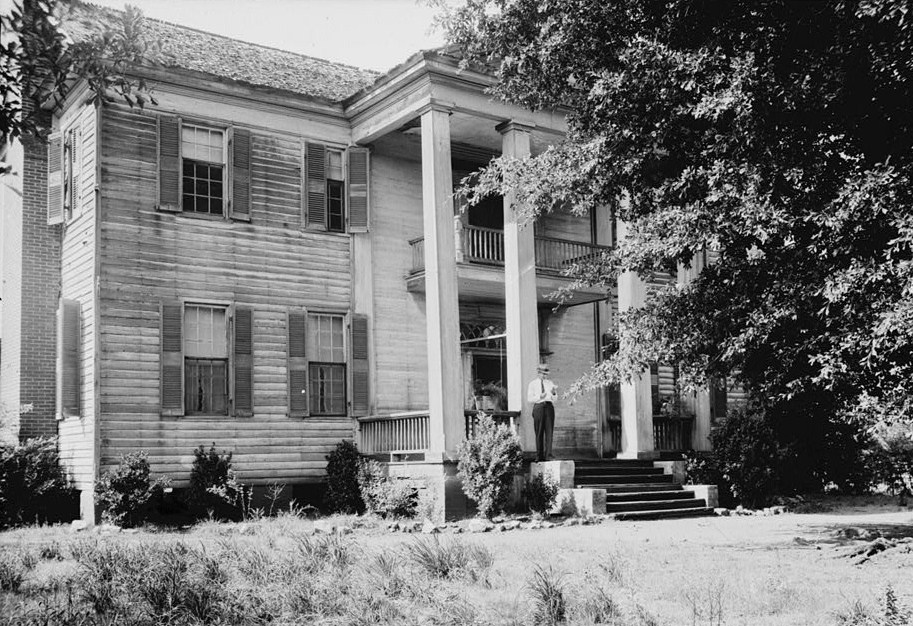
- 1935 HABS image

- Location within Alabama Location within the United States
- Location: 29229 AL 21, Talladega, Alabama
- Coordinates: 33°24′9″N 86°8′34″W
- Area: 15 acres (6.1 ha)
- Built: 1835
- Architectural style: Greek Revival, I House
- NRHP reference No.: 98000104
- Added to NRHP: February 20, 1998

Thornhill, also known as the Hade–Lewis House, is a plantation in Talladega County, Alabama, built beginning in 1835 by planter John Hardie. Hardie was an immigrant from Scotland, arriving in the Alabama Territory in 1818 after first spending time in New York and Virginia. He acquired the 700 acres (280 ha) of land for Thornhill in 1834 or 1835. The topology of the land reminded Hardie of his father's Thorn Hill Farm in Kinross, Scotland, so he named the property Thornhill. Cotton was the primary crop grown at Thornhill with about 50 enslaved people being held at the plantation by Hardie.

The property includes the Classical Revival house, a chapel, the servants' quarters, the plantation office, a barn, a horse racetrack and the family cemetery, along with the approach road. The main house is an I-house in plan, one room deep in front, two stories, with a rear ell. The facade is five bays wide and fronted by a central portico. The interior has a central hall plan, flanked by a parlor, a dining room and a library in the ell. A kitchen occupies the farther reaches of the ell.

Thornhill, which is now in city of Talladega, was listed on the National Register of Historic Places on February 20, 1998.
