= Orange Vale =

Historic house in Alabama, United States

- Lawler-Whiting House
- U.S. National Register of Historic Places
- Alabama Register of Landmarks and Heritage
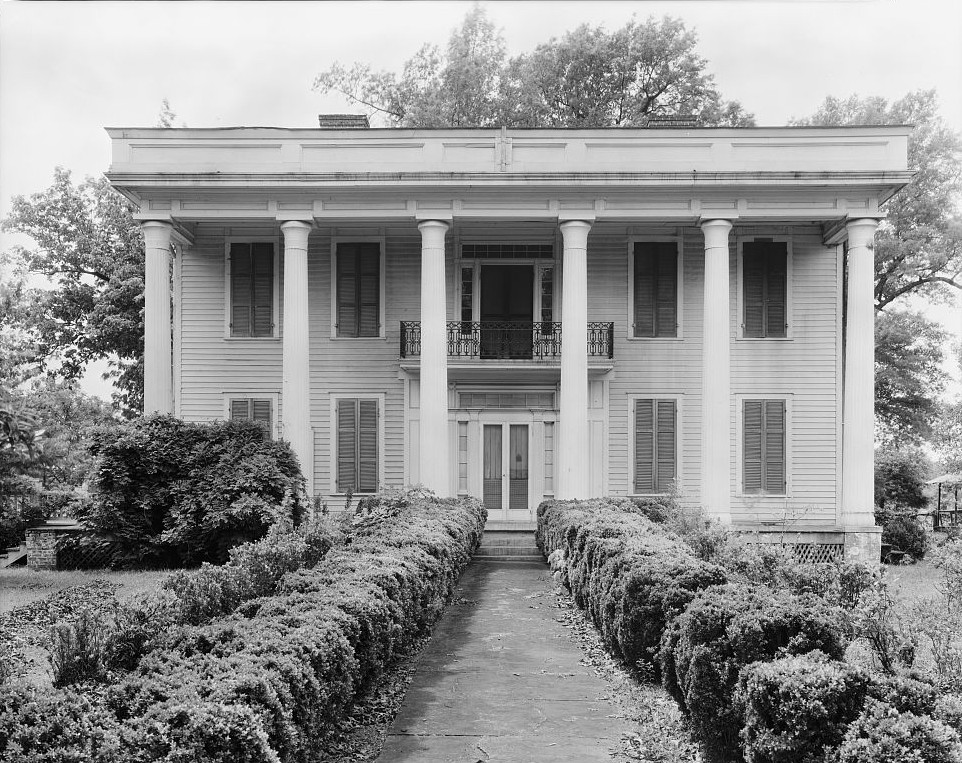
- 1939 HABS image

- Location within Alabama Location within the United States
- Location: AL 21 S of Talladega, Talladega, Alabama
- Coordinates: 33°21′27″N 86°9′56″W
- Area: 107 acres (43 ha)
- Built: 1852
- Architect: Kirkland, H.H.
- Architectural style: Greek Revival
- NRHP reference No.: 86001157

Significant dates
- Added to NRHP: May 22, 1986
- Designated ARLH: October 8, 1981

Orange Vale, also known as the Lawler-Whiting House, is a Greek Revival plantation house completed in 1854 near Talladega, Alabama. The house was the centerpiece of a 3,000-acre (1,200 ha) cotton plantation, a forced-labor farm worked by black people enslaved by the land's white owners.

The house is principally associated with Levi Lawler, an Alabama state legislator, who principally used it during the summer. The house is a formal two-story frame structure with a hexastyle square-columned portico across the front, supporting a heavy paneled entablature. There is no pediment. The hipped roof is flanked by interior chimneys. Small flat-roofed one-story pavilions flank the house on either side and extend beyond the rear of the house. The rear has two-level porches across the width. The interior has a center-hall plan with the hall extending to the back porch. 108 acres (44 ha) remain of the original property, with seven other buildings.

Orange Vale was listed on the National Register of Historic Places on May 22, 1986.
