= Oaklawn (Huntsville, Alabama) =

Historic house in Alabama, United States

- John Robinson House
- U.S. National Register of Historic Places
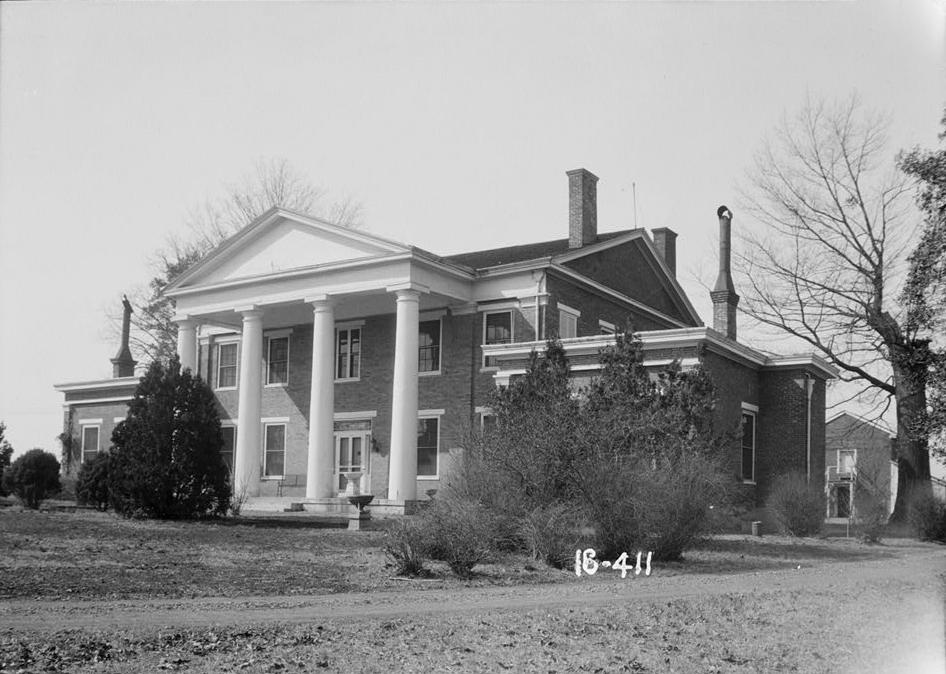
- The house in a 1934 HABS photo

- Location within Huntsville, Alabama Location within Alabama Location within the United States
- Location: 2709 Meridian St. N, Huntsville, Alabama
- Coordinates: 34°45′38″N 86°34′38″W
- Area: 6 acres (2.4 ha)
- Built: 1844
- Architectural style: Greek Revival
- NRHP reference No.: 77000212
- Added to NRHP: October 6, 1977

Oaklawn (also known as the John Robinson House and the Robinson-Dilworth House) is a historic residence in Huntsville, Alabama. It was built in 1844 by John Robinson, a longtime revenue commissioner in Madison County who became one of the county's largest landowners. During the Civil War, the house was used by the Union Army as an officers' quarters. The family vacated the house in the late 19th century, and during the Spanish–American War, the grounds were used as an army camp and hospital. In 1919, the house was purchased by the Dilworth family and restored from its poor condition. The house was later owned by Max Luther, a prominent local merchant.

The Greek Revival house has a five-bay main block with two attached wings to the sides, an unusual layout for the time in Alabama. A portico spans the center three bays, and has four smooth Doric columns supporting a plain entablature and pediment. Pilasters with Doric capitals are present on the corners of both the main block and the wings, as well as terminating the portico. The main block has a gable roof, while the one-story wings have flat roofs with deep cornices forming parapets. There are four interior chimneys in the main block, and one each in the wings. The double entry doors have multi-pane sidelights and a transom. The interior is laid out with a large central hall on both floors, flanked by a pair of rooms on each side. Each wing features one room, with extensions built in the 1920s containing bathrooms. A kitchen was added to the rear in the 1940s.

The house was listed on the National Register of Historic Places in 1977.
