= Owen Plantation House =

- U.S. National Register of Historic Places
- Location within Alabama
- Nearest city: Bessemer, Alabama
- Coordinates: 33°20′50″N 86°59′00″W
- Area: 6 acres (2.4 ha)
- Built: 1833, 1838
- Built by: Owen, Thomas H.
- NRHP reference No.: 76000330
- Added to NRHP: October 22, 1976

The Owen Plantation House, or The Owen House, in Jefferson County, Alabama near Bessemer, Alabama, dates from 1838. It was listed on the National Register of Historic Places in 1976.

It was built in stages, starting with a one-story two-room frame cabin built in 1833, which later served as a dining and kitchen wing. The main section is a two-story frame building five bays wide, with a gabled roof and box cornice returns, started in 1838. It has end-exterior chimneys at both ends of the main section and at the far end of the kitchen wing. The front has a one-story porch.

In 1976 it was donated to the West Jefferson County Historical Society, to be restored and serve as a house museum.

It is located south of Bessemer on Eastern Valley Rd.
