= Siddonsville, Alabama =

Unincorporated community in Alabama, United States

- Unincorporated community
- Location within the state of Alabama Siddonsville (the United States)
- Coordinates: 32°25′4.8″N 87°36′46.8″W
- Country: United States
- State: Alabama
- County: Marengo
- Elevation: 253 ft (77 m)
- Time zone: UTC-6 (Central (CST))
  - Summer (DST): UTC-5 (CDT)
- Area code: 334

Siddonsville is an unincorporated community in Marengo County, Alabama, United States. Siddonsville had a post office at one time, but it no longer exists.

== Geography ==
Siddonsville is located at 32.418°N 87.613°W and has an elevation of 253 feet (77 m).
