= Marshall's Grove =

Historic house in Alabama, United States

- Marshall's Grove Plantation House
- U.S. National Register of Historic Places
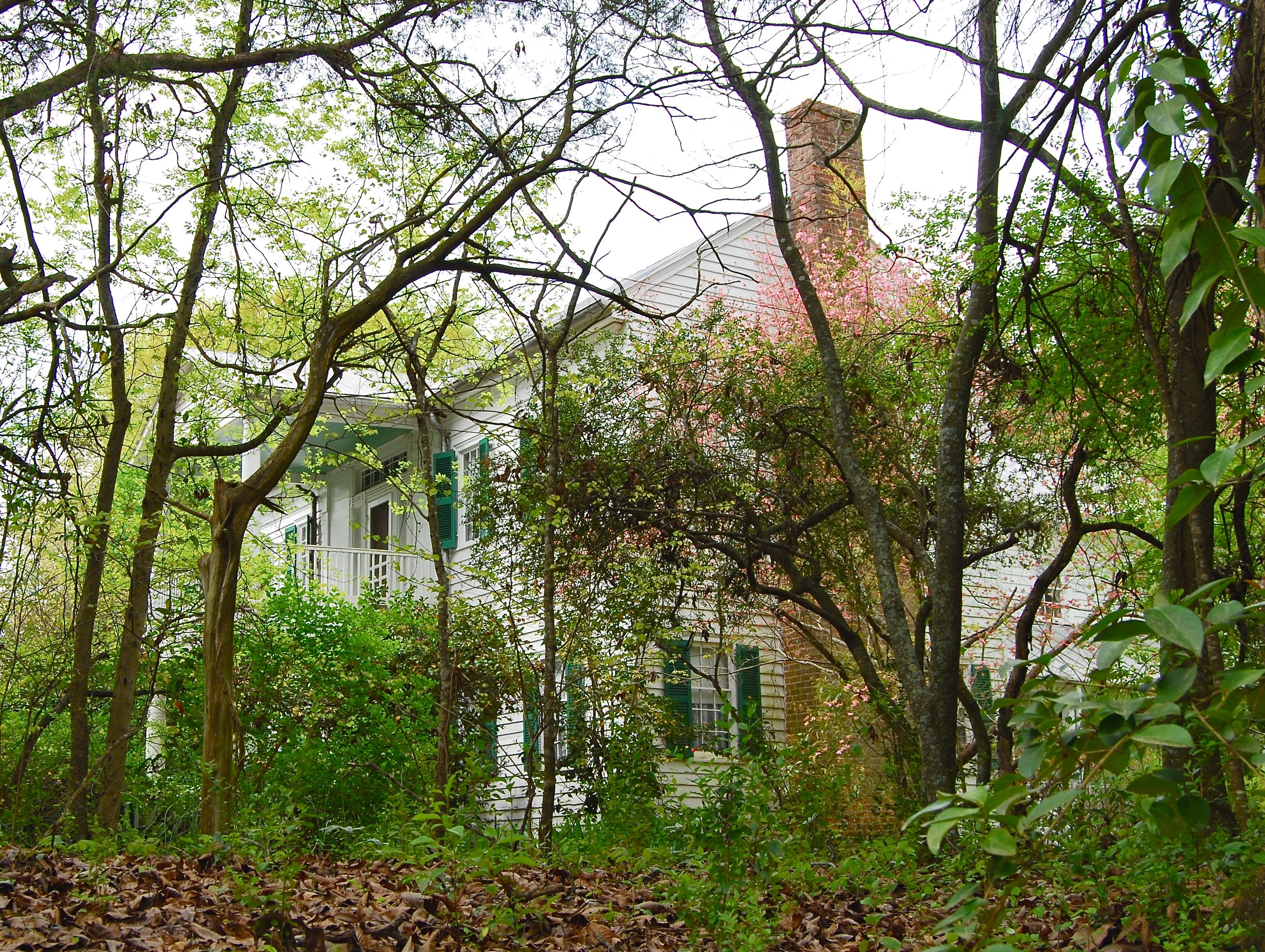

- Location within Alabama Location within the United States
- Nearest city: Selma, Alabama
- Coordinates: 32°27′58″N 87°0′23″W
- Area: 1.4 acres (0.57 ha)
- Built: 1840
- Architectural style: Federal
- NRHP reference No.: 82002010
- Added to NRHP: February 4, 1982

Marshall's Grove is a historic plantation house near Selma, Alabama, United States. The two-story wood-frame house was built in the Federal-style in 1840. It is five bays wide, with a two-tiered, pedimented portico spanning the central bay. It was built for Dr. Hugh Marshall, a native of Charleston, South Carolina who migrated to Alabama during the 1830s. Located on the northern route into Selma, it was commandeered by Union General James H. Wilson during the Battle of Selma. Marshall's wife and daughters were allowed to remain in the house during the occupation. The house was restored by Marshall's great-granddaughter, Seleta Llewellyn, during the mid-to-late 20th century. It was added to the National Register of Historic Places on February 4, 1982.
