= Oakhurst (Emelle, Alabama) =

Historic house in Alabama, United States

- U.S. National Register of Historic Places
- Alabama Register of Landmarks and Heritage
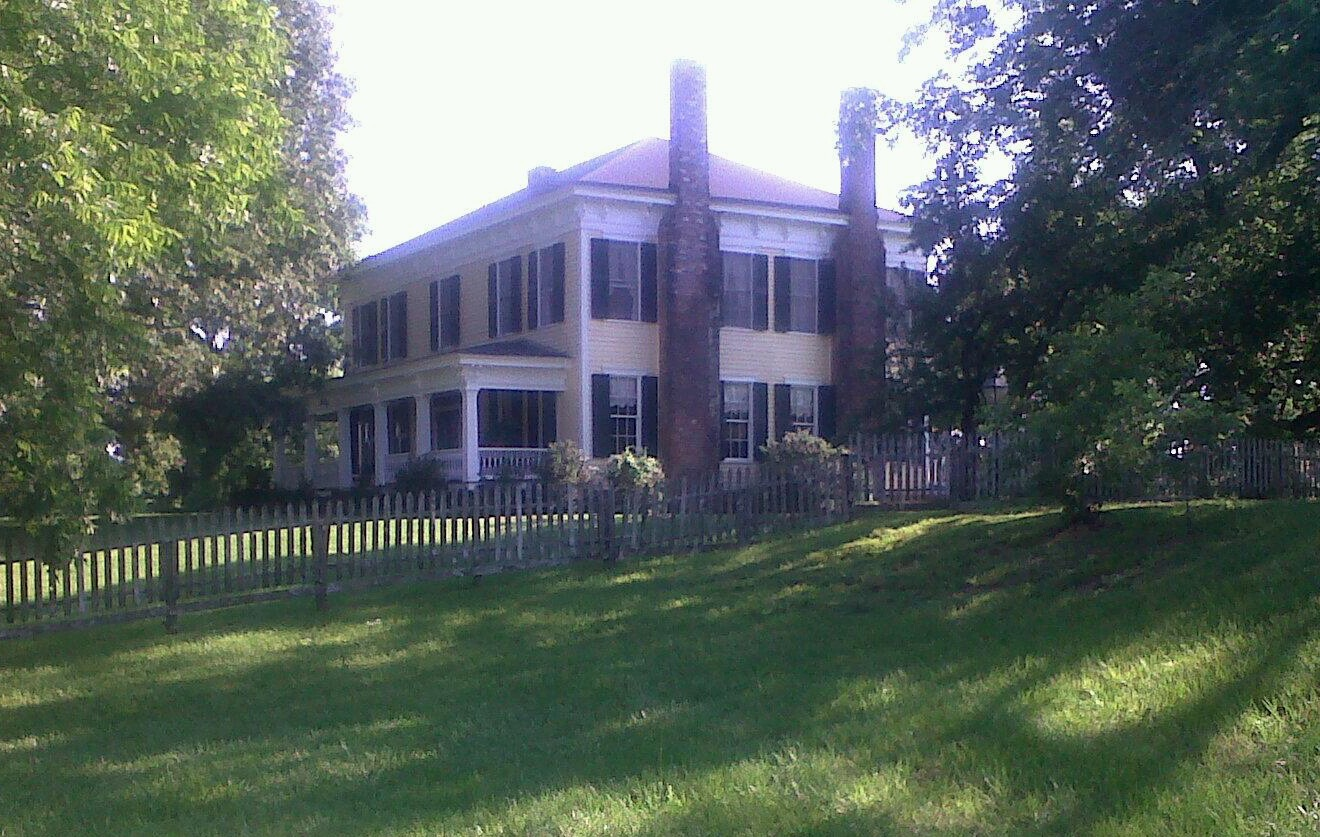

- Location within Alabama Location within the United States
- Location: Gainesville-Lacy's Ford Rd. approx. 3 mi. SW of AL 116, Emelle, Alabama
- Coordinates: 32°46′48″N 88°16′9″W
- Area: 12.5 acres (5.1 ha)
- Built: 1854
- Architectural style: Greek Revival, Italianate
- NRHP reference No.: 86003563

Significant dates
- Added to NRHP: January 6, 1987
- Designated ARLH: January 14, 1980

Oakhurst, also known as Winston Place and Mitchell Place, is a historic house near Emelle, Alabama. The two-story wood-frame house was built for Augustus Anthony Winston, a banker and cotton factor from Mobile, in 1854. The Greek Revival-style structure is five bays wide, with a one-story porch spanning the entire width of the primary facade. A bracketed cornice atop the entablature wraps around the entire house. It reflects the influence of the Italianate-style. This architectural combination, sometimes referred to as a "bracketed Greek Revival" style, was popular in Alabama from the 1850s to 1890s.

The house was added to the Alabama Register of Landmarks and Heritage on January 14, 1980, and to the National Register of Historic Places on January 6, 1987.
