= Crumptonia, Alabama =

Unincorporated community in Alabama, United States

- Unincorporated community
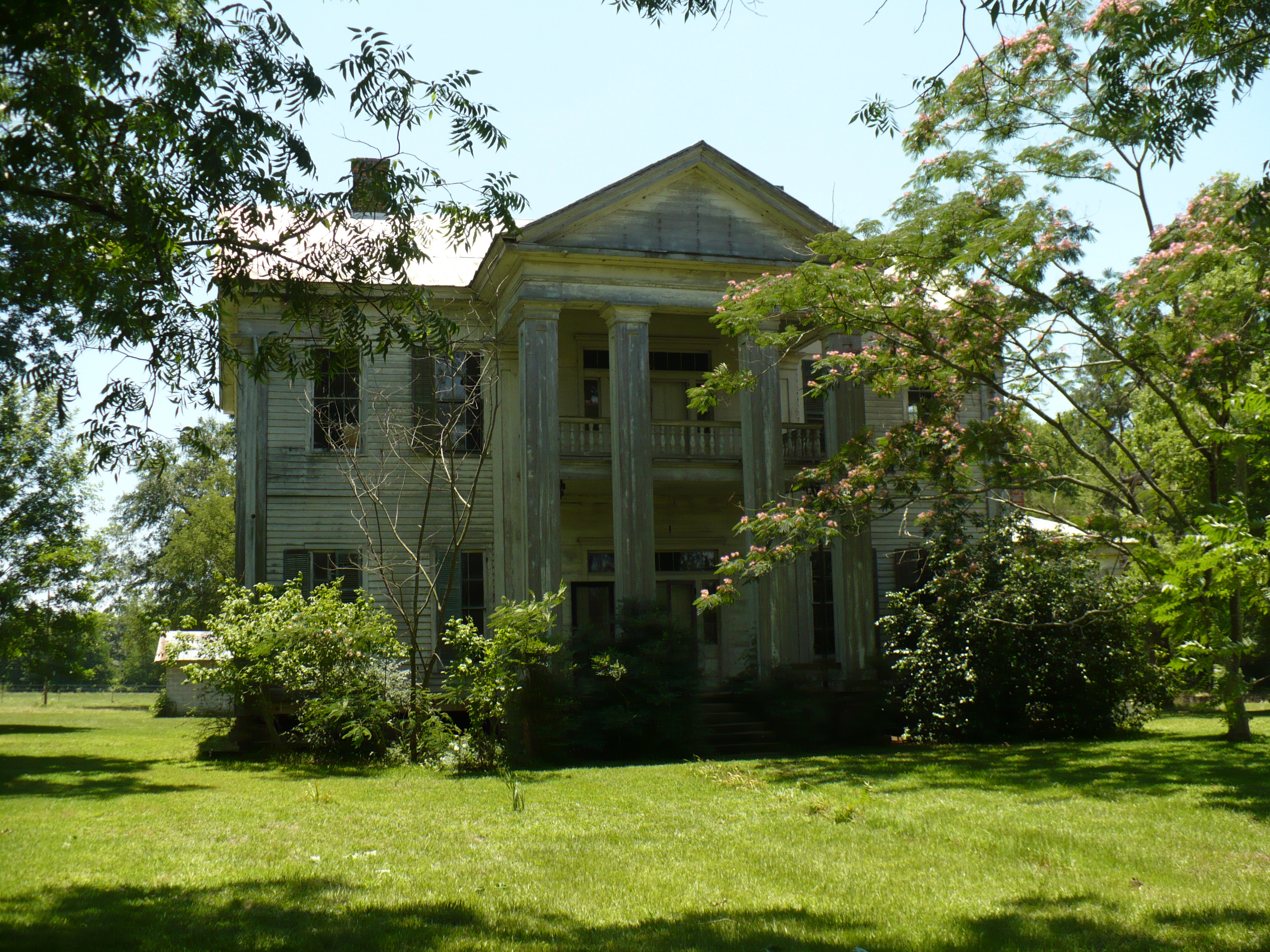
- Crumptonia Plantation

- Location in Alabama Crumptonia (the United States)
- Coordinates: 32°12′50″N 87°17′22″W
- Country: United States
- State: Alabama
- County: Dallas
- Elevation: 141 ft (43 m)
- Time zone: UTC-6 (Central (CST))
  - Summer (DST): UTC-5 (CDT)
- ZIP code: 36761
- Area code: 251
- GNIS feature ID: 156236

Crumptonia is an unincorporated community in Dallas County, Alabama. It is named for a local plantation house of the same name, built in 1855 by Claudius M. Cochran and later owned the Crumpton family.
