= Cuba Plantation =

Historic house in Alabama, United States

- U.S. National Register of Historic Places
- U.S. Historic district
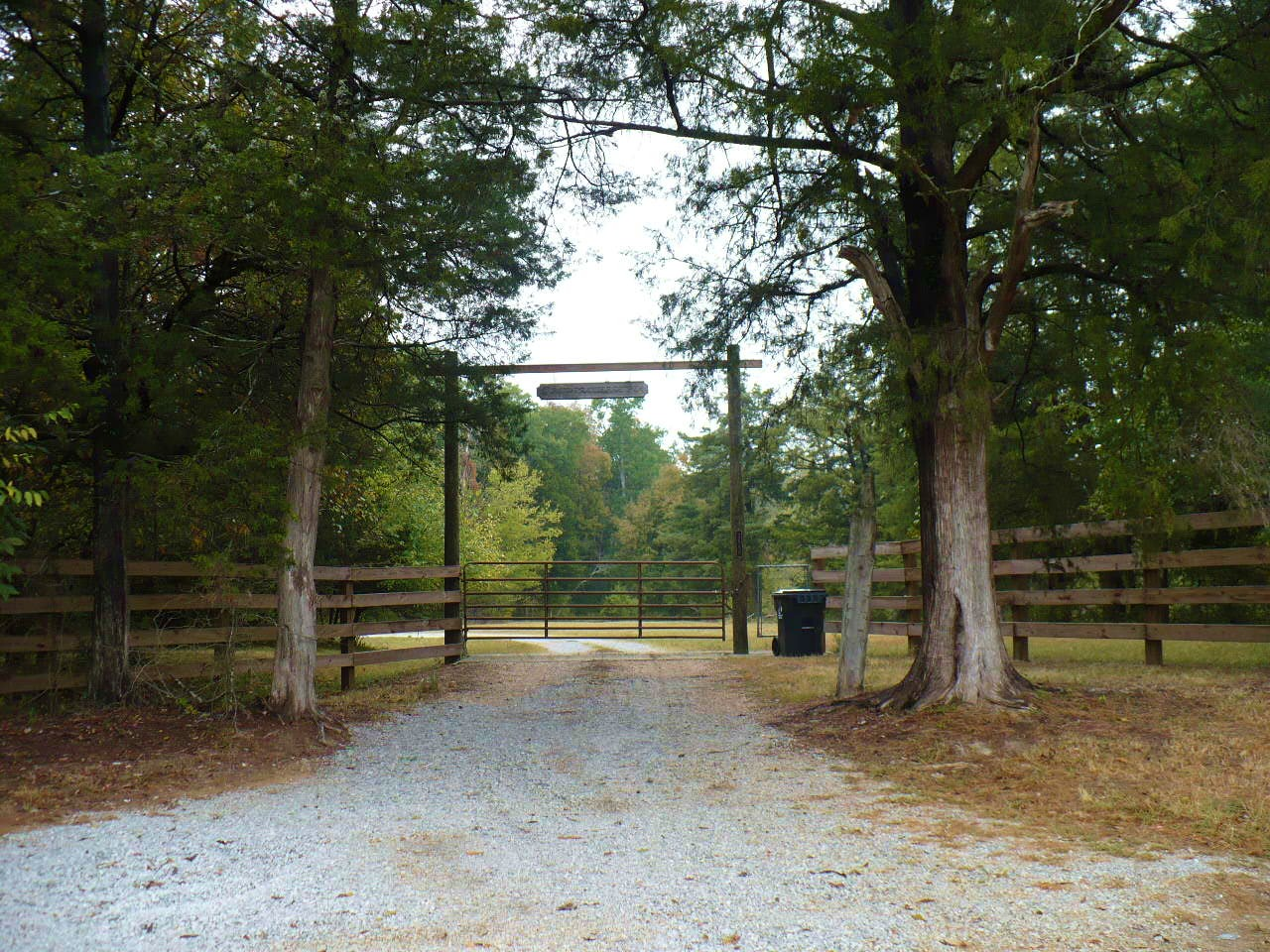
- Entrance gate to Cuba Plantation

- Location within Alabama Location within the United States
- Nearest city: Faunsdale, Alabama
- Coordinates: 32°26′28″N 87°38′47″W
- Built: 1850
- MPS: Plantation Houses of the Alabama Canebrake and Their Associated Outbuildings Multiple Property Submission
- NRHP reference No.: 93000601
- Added to NRHP: July 13, 1993

Cuba Plantation is a historic plantation house located in Faunsdale, Alabama. It was built in 1850 by Andrew Pickens Calhoun as an overseer's house for this, his second slave plantation. He added about 420 acres to Cuba Plantation, purchased from William Henry Tayloe, son of John Tayloe III of The Octagon House-called Adventure. His primary plantation was the nearby Tulip Hill. Andrew Calhoun was the son of John C. Calhoun, seventh Vice President of the United States, who frequented the Octagon House while in Washington, D.C. as Secretary of War and later an independent outlier of the anti-Jacksonian Whig Party, later realigning himself with the Democrats' policies. It was sold in 1863 to Tristram Benjamin Bethea, who resided in Montgomery County, Alabama. Originally a one-story structure, the house was later enlarged on the ground floor and a second story added by the Bethea family. The house was added to the National Register of Historic Places on July 13, 1993, as a part of the Plantation Houses of the Alabama Canebrake and Their Associated Outbuildings Multiple Property Submission.
