= Cedar Haven =

Historic house in Alabama, United States

- U.S. National Register of Historic Places
- Front of the house

- Location within Alabama Location within the United States
- Nearest city: Faunsdale, Alabama
- Coordinates: 32°25′4″N 87°35′14″W
- Built: 1850
- Architectural style: Greek Revival
- MPS: Plantation Houses of the Alabama Canebrake and Their Associated Outbuildings Multiple Property Submission
- NRHP reference No.: 93000600
- Added to NRHP: July 13, 1993

Cedar Haven was a historic Greek Revival plantation house located near Faunsdale, Alabama. It was built in 1850 by Phillip J. Weaver. Weaver was a prominent merchant and planter. He was born in Mifflintown, Pennsylvania in 1797 and relocated to Selma from Uniontown, Maryland in 1818. He ran a very successful store in Selma and also maintained a home there. Weaver was the paternal grandfather of the artist Clara Weaver Parrish.

When the community of Woodville, near Cedar Haven, applied for a post office, the name Woodville was already in use by another Alabama community. Weaver suggested the name Uniontown and his suggestion remains as the name of the town until this day. Weaver was killed in Selma in 1865, purportedly by a Union soldier, several months after Wilson's Raid on Selma. The next owner of the plantation was John Davidson Alexander, born in Mecklenburg County, North Carolina in 1820. He died in 1901. Cedar Haven was inherited by his son, Houston Alexander, following his death.

The house featured a two-story Doric tetrastyle portico. It was added to the National Register of Historic Places on July 13, 1993, as a part of the Plantation Houses of the Alabama Canebrake and Their Associated Outbuildings Multiple Property Submission.

The house, already badly deteriorated in 1995, was razed in the 2000s.
