= Canebrake (region of Alabama) =

Historical region in Alabama, US

The Canebrake is a historical region of west-central Alabama in the United States, which was once dominated by thickets of Arundinaria, a type of bamboo, or cane, native to North America. It was centered on the junction of the Tombigbee and Black Warrior rivers, near Demopolis, and extended eastward to include large parts of Hale, Marengo, and Perry counties. Portions of Greene and Sumter were also often included.

== History ==
Cane thickets once covered hundreds of thousands of acres in Alabama, but this area, lying within the Black Belt, had the most extensive stands. American Naturalist William Bartram noted the growth in this area as he traveled along the Tombigbee River in 1775. He described cane that was "thick as a man's arm, or three or four inches in diameter; I suppose one joint of some of them would contain above a quart of water."

The cane began to disappear following settlement by numerous European Americans after the Creek Wars and, especially, Indian Removal. The settlers introduced crops that replaced the native cane and suppressed fires. This resulted in species flourishing that competed with the cane. In addition, depending on enslaved labor, the new settlers had workers clear the area of cane in order to cultivate the important commodity crop of cotton. But, as late as 1845, Scottish geologist Charles Lyell noted the height and density of cane along the Black Warrior River.

In his 1947 account of the Canebrake region, "Chronicles of the Canebrake, 1817-1860", published in Alabama Historical Quarterly, John Witherspoon DuBose described the early settlers, the land and plantations they bought or developed, and many of the details of the lives of these early settlers.
