= William Henry Tayloe =

American businessman (1799–1871)

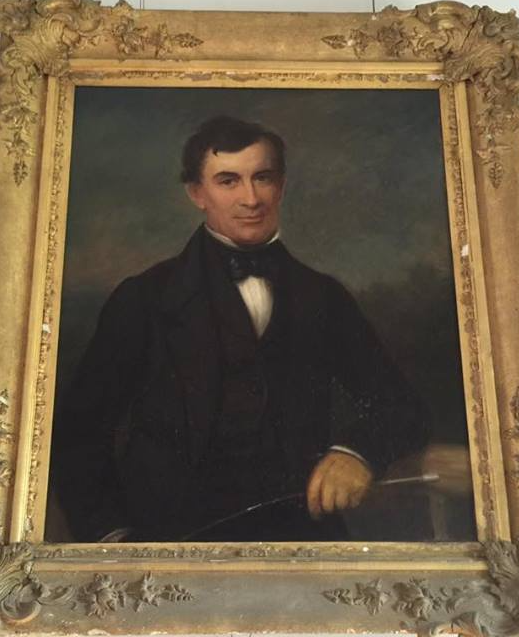
- Portrait of William Henry Tayloe by Charles Bird King
- Born: January 29, 1799; Mount Airy, Richmond County, Virginia, Virginia, US
- Died: April 9, 1871 (aged 72); Georgetown, D.C.

William Henry Tayloe (January 29, 1799 – January 7, 1871) was an American plantation owner, enslaver, horse breeder, businessowner, and land speculator during the first half of the 19th century. He inherited a vast estate from his father and expanded his holdings, pioneering new territory in the Canebrake region of Alabama.

== Birth and parentage ==
Tayloe was born on January 29, 1799, at Mount Airy, Richmond County, Virginia, the grand colonial estate built by his grandfather Colonel John Tayloe II and then the current residence of his father Colonel John Tayloe III, arguably the wealthiest plantation owner in the country. A year after William's birth, his father built The Octagon House in Washington, D.C., at the behest of George Washington. His maternal grandfather was Benjamin Ogle, ninth governor of Maryland, and great-grandfather was former Provincial governor, Samuel Ogle.

== Career ==
After inheriting Mount Airy, Richmond County, Virginia from his father Colonel John Tayloe III, William, through his brother Henry Augustine Tayloe, began acquiring and speculating in land in the Canebrake, founding with his brothers Benjamin Ogle Tayloe and George Plater Tayloe, Faunsdale Plantation and co-owning Adventure Plantation Marengo County, Alabama, later part of Cuba Plantation, Larkin Plantation (Perry County, Alabama) and Oakland Plantation (Marengo County, Alabama).

After the American Civil War, Tayloe held the mortgage on Belair Mansion (Bowie, Maryland), the home of Dr. George C Ogle (1817 - 1899), son of Benjamin Ogle II and Anna Maria Cooke. The property was sold to the executors of the estate of the mortgage holder William H Tayloe, on May 16, 1871.
