= National Register of Historic Places listings in Marengo County, Alabama =

Location of Marengo County in Alabama

This is a list of the National Register of Historic Places listings in Marengo County, Alabama.

This is intended to be a complete list of the properties and districts on the National Register of Historic Places in Marengo County, Alabama, United States. Latitude and longitude coordinates are provided for many National Register properties and districts; these locations may be seen together in a Google map.

There are 28 properties and districts listed on the National Register in the county, including one National Historic Landmark.

This National Park Service list is complete through NPS recent listings posted January 16, 2026.

== Current listings ==
	Name on the Register	Image	Date listed	Location	City or town	Description
1	Allen Grove	Allen Grove	July 7, 1994 (#94000689)	County Road 1, south of Old Spring Hill; 32°25′44″N 87°46′30″W	Old Spring Hill	A historic district including a Greek Revival style main house (c. 1857), two other buildings and 50 acres (20 ha).
2	Altwood	Altwood	July 13, 1993 (#93000598)	West of County Road 51, south of its junction with County Road 54; 32°25′26″N 87°40′28″W	Faunsdale	Plantation house with Tidewater Virginia influences, built in 1836.
3	Ashe Cottage	Ashe Cottage	October 19, 1978 (#78000502)	307 N. Commissioners Ave. 32°31′09″N 87°50′25″W	Demopolis	Town house built in 1832 and remodeled in the Carpenter Gothic style in 1858.
4	Bluff Hall	Bluff Hall	July 28, 1970 (#70000105)	405 N. Commissioners Ave. 32°31′13″N 87°50′25″W	Demopolis	Federal style mansion built in 1832 for Francis Strother Lyon and wife, Sarah Serena Glover, by her father, Allen Glover. Remodeled in the Greek Revival style in the 1840s.
5	Cedar Crest	Cedar Crest	August 5, 1993 (#93000763)	Eastern side of County Road 51, 0.5 miles (0.80 km) south of County Road 54; 32°25′41″N 87°39′37″W	Faunsdale	Greek Revival style plantation house built in 1850 for Kimbrough C. Dubose.
6	Cedar Grove Plantation	Cedar Grove Plantation	July 13, 1993 (#93000599)	County Road 78 east of its junction with State Route 25; 32°26′51″N 87°34′31″W	Faunsdale	Large plantation house built in 1848 in the Greek Revival style. Known, in part, for its association with Nicola Marschall.
7	Cedar Haven	Cedar Haven	July 13, 1993 (#93000600)	County Road 61 southeast of its junction with State Route 25; 32°25′04″N 87°35′14″W	Faunsdale	Greek Revival style plantation house built in 1850 and destroyed in 2000s. The site remains listed on the register.
8	Confederate Park	Confederate Park	October 29, 1975 (#75000319)	Bounded by Main, Capitol, Walnut, and Washington Sts. 32°31′04″N 87°50′17″W	Demopolis	Town square of Demopolis, established in 1819. Covering one city block, it is one of the oldest public squares known in Alabama.
9	Cuba Plantation	Cuba Plantation	July 13, 1993 (#93000601)	County Road 54 west of its junction with State Route 25; 32°26′28″N 87°38′47″W	Faunsdale	Plantation established by Andrew Pickens Calhoun, son of John C. Calhoun. Sold to Tristram Bethea in 1863, it has remained in the Bethea family to the present day.
10	Curtis House	Curtis House	April 11, 1977 (#77000214)	510 N. Main; 32°31′17″N 87°50′18″W	Demopolis	Federal style town house built in 1840 by Samuel Curtis, a Revolutionary War veteran.
11	Demopolis Historic District	Demopolis Historic District	October 25, 1979 (#79000391)	Roughly bounded by E. Gaines, N. Ash, W. Pettus, & S. Stewart Sts. 32°31′03″N 87°50′21″W	Demopolis	Boundary increase and name changed in 2014
12	Demopolis Public School	Demopolis Public School	October 28, 1983 (#83003453)	601 S. Main Ave. 32°30′38″N 87°50′18″W	Demopolis	Beaux-Arts style public school building, completed in 1914.
13	Patrick Farrish House	Patrick Farrish House	August 31, 2000 (#00001026)	177 East St. 32°16′09″N 87°37′09″W	Thomaston	Craftsman style house built in 1926.
14	Faunsdale Plantation	Faunsdale Plantation	July 13, 1993 (#93000602)	County Road 54 just west of its junction with State Route 25; 32°26′07″N 87°36′07″W	Faunsdale	Historic district with a Greek Revival style main house, built in 1844, and several slave quarters built in the Carpenter Gothic style.
15	Foscue-Whitfield House	Foscue-Whitfield House	January 21, 1974 (#74000423)	West of Demopolis on U.S. Route 80; 32°29′06″N 87°52′01″W	Demopolis	Federal style brick house built in 1840 for Augustus Foscue.
16	Gaineswood	Gaineswood	January 5, 1972 (#72000167)	805 S. Cedar St. 32°30′30″N 87°50′01″W	Demopolis	Built by Nathan Bryan Whitfield from 1843 to 1860, this plantation house is considered by architectural historians as one of the most elaborate and significant examples of Greek Revival architecture in Alabama.
17	Glover Mausoleum	Glover Mausoleum	January 21, 1974 (#74000424)	Riverside Cemetery; 32°30′54″N 87°50′59″W	Demopolis	Elaborate Greek Revival style mausoleum, completed in 1845 by Mary Anne Glover for the burial of her husband, Allen Glover.
18	C. S. Golden House	C. S. Golden House	August 31, 2000 (#00001029)	540 7th Ave. 32°16′26″N 87°37′22″W	Thomaston	Queen Anne style house built in 1898.
19	Half-Chance Bridge	Half-Chance Bridge	September 14, 1972 (#72000166)	Marengo County Route 39 over the Chickasaw Bogue Creek; 32°18′44″N 87°42′04″W	Dayton	Iron bridge built by the King Iron Bridge Manufacturing Company of Cleveland, Ohio in 1880. Destroyed in a flood between 2008 and 2012.
20	Jefferson Historic District	Jefferson Historic District	November 13, 1976 (#76000342)	State Route 28; 32°23′05″N 87°53′49″W	Jefferson	Collection of thirteen Greek Revival buildings in the village of Jefferson that reflect the pre-Civil War plantation economy of Alabama.
21	Lyon-Lamar House	Lyon-Lamar House	January 21, 1974 (#74000425)	102 S. Main Ave. 32°30′56″N 87°50′21″W	Demopolis	Greek Revival style mansion completed in 1853 by George Gaines Lyon and his wife, Anne Glover.
22	Old Courthouse	Old Courthouse	January 18, 1974 (#74000426)	300 W. Cahaba Ave. 32°18′43″N 87°48′03″W	Linden	The third courthouse for Marengo County, this Greek Revival style building was completed in 1850.
23	William Poole House	William Poole House	July 7, 1994 (#94000687)	Junction of State Route 25 and Palmetto Rd. 32°20′58″N 87°38′41″W	Dayton	Greek Revival style plantation house built in 1848.
24	Roseland Plantation	Roseland Plantation	January 20, 1994 (#93001476)	County Road 54, about 2 miles (3.2 km) southeast of Faunsdale. 32°26′40″N 87°34′03″W	Faunsdale	The site of a historic plantation. The Greek Revival style main house was completed in 1850. It has been destroyed, but several outbuildings remain.
25	Thomaston Central Historic District	Thomaston Central Historic District	September 14, 2000 (#00001023)	Roughly bounded by Chestnut St., 6th Ave., 7th Ave., Short St., and the CSX railroad line 32°16′04″N 87°37′31″W	Thomaston	Historic district covering much of the town of Thomaston. Its contains examples of early 20th century architecture.
26	Thomaston Colored Institute	Thomaston Colored Institute	August 31, 2000 (#00001024)	1120 7th Ave. 32°16′22″N 87°37′49″W	Thomaston	Completed in 1910 by West Alabama Primitive Baptist Association as a school for African Americans.
27	U.S. Post Office	U.S. Post Office	July 28, 1984 (#84000657)	100 W. Capitol St. 32°31′06″N 87°50′16″W	Demopolis	Neoclassical style post office built in 1914.
28	White Bluff	White Bluff	August 25, 1970 (#70000106)	Arch St. 32°31′11″N 87°50′30″W	Demopolis	Historic bluff above the Tombigbee River in Demopolis, first named Ecor Blanc by 18th century French explorers.

== See also ==
- Plantation Houses of the Alabama Canebrake and Their Associated Outbuildings Multiple Property Submission
- List of National Historic Landmarks in Alabama
- National Register of Historic Places listings in Alabama
