= National Register of Historic Places listings in Hale County, Alabama =

Location of Hale County in Alabama

This is a list of the National Register of Historic Places listings in Hale County, Alabama.

This is intended to be a complete list of the properties and districts on the National Register of Historic Places in Hale County, Alabama, United States. Latitude and longitude coordinates are provided for many National Register properties and districts; these locations may be seen together in an online map.

There are 21 properties and districts listed on the National Register in the county, including two National Historic Landmarks.

This National Park Service list is complete through NPS recent listings posted January 16, 2026.

== Current listings ==
| | Name on the Register | Image | Date listed | Location | City or town | Description |
|---|---|---|---|---|---|---|
| 1 | Battersea | Battersea | July 7, 1994 (#94000698) | County Road 8, east of its junction with State Route 69; 32°30′37″N 87°42′11″W | Prairieville | |
| 2 | Bermuda Hill | Bermuda Hill | July 7, 1994 (#94000692) | State Route 69 north of its junction with County Road 2; 32°31′48″N 87°41′39″W | Prairieville | |
| 3 | Borden Oaks | Borden Oaks | July 7, 1994 (#94000685) | North of County Road 28, east of its junction with State Route 14; 32°43′04″N 87°41′21″W | Greensboro vicinity | |
| 4 | Emory School | Emory School | February 20, 1998 (#98000109) | County Road 16, approximately 1 mile west of its junction with State Route 69; 32°36′46″N 87°41′48″W | Greensboro vicinity | |
| 5 | John Erwin House | John Erwin House | January 18, 1978 (#78000488) | 705 Erwin Dr. 32°42′01″N 87°35′45″W | Greensboro | |
| 6 | Greensboro Historic District | Greensboro Historic District | August 13, 1976 (#76000328) | Main St. between Hobson and 1st 32°42′14″N 87°36′05″W | Greensboro | |
| 7 | Hatch House | Hatch House | October 11, 1991 (#91001483) | Junction of State Route 14 and Norfleet Rd. 32°43′23″N 87°37′43″W | Greensboro | |
| 8 | Alfred Hatch Place at Arcola | Alfred Hatch Place at Arcola | January 6, 1988 (#87001784) | Route 1, County Road 2; 32°33′59″N 87°46′12″W | Arcola | |
| 9 | Hawthorne | Hawthorne | July 7, 1994 (#94000694) | County Road 8 just north of its junction with State Route 69; 32°30′50″N 87°41′59″W | Prairieville | |
| 10 | Kerby House | Kerby House | July 7, 1994 (#94000697) | County Road 8 southeast of its junction with State Route 69; 32°30′21″N 87°41′14″W | Prairieville | |
| 11 | Magnolia Grove | Magnolia Grove | April 11, 1973 (#73000345) | Western end of Main St. 32°42′18″N 87°36′39″W | Greensboro | |
| 12 | Magnolia Hall | Magnolia Hall | June 25, 2021 (#100006665) | 805 Otts St. 32°42′09″N 87°35′27″W | Greensboro | |
| 13 | McGehee-Stringfellow House | McGehee-Stringfellow House | September 17, 1980 (#80000686) | Northwest of Greensboro on State Route 30; 32°45′07″N 87°40′41″W | Greensboro vicinity | Collapsed in the 1980s |
| 14 | Millwood | Millwood | September 26, 1989 (#89000314) | Roughly bounded by Millwood Pond, County Road 17, and the Black Warrior River; 32°39′34″N 87°44′59″W | Greensboro vicinity | |
| 15 | Moundville | Moundville | October 15, 1966 (#66000149) | 1 mile (1.6 km) west of Moundville on State Route 21; 33°00′23″N 87°37′56″W | Moundville | |
| 16 | Oak Grove School | Oak Grove School | March 3, 1998 (#98000108) | 0.25 miles west of State Route 69, 1 mile north of the junction of U.S. Route 80 and State Route 69; 32°32′48″N 87°40′48″W | Prairieville | |
| 17 | Payne House | | July 7, 1994 (#94000690) | U.S. Route 61 southeast of Greensboro; 32°41′26″N 87°34′36″W | Greensboro vicinity | |
| 18 | St. Andrew's Church | St. Andrew's Church | November 7, 1973 (#73000347) | U.S. Route 80; 32°30′39″N 87°42′05″W | Prairieville | |
| 19 | Augusta Sledge House | Augusta Sledge House | July 7, 1994 (#94000686) | County Road 12 between State Routes 25 and 61, southwest of Newbern; 32°31′11″N 87°34′08″W | Newbern vicinity | Destroyed |
| 20 | Tanglewood | Tanglewood | April 11, 1973 (#73000346) | About 11 miles north of Greensboro off State Route 23; 32°51′20″N 87°39′37″W | Akron vicinity | |
| 21 | Waldwic | Waldwic | July 22, 1994 (#94000684) | Western side of State Route 69, south of Gallion; 32°29′03″N 87°42′56″W | Gallion vicinity | |

== See also ==
- Plantation Houses of the Alabama Canebrake and Their Associated Outbuildings Multiple Property Submission
- List of National Historic Landmarks in Alabama
- National Register of Historic Places listings in Alabama
