= Plantation Houses of the Alabama Canebrake and Their Associated Outbuildings Multiple Property Submission =

- U.S. National Register of Historic Places
- Location within Alabama
- Location: Hale and Marengo counties, Alabama
- Coordinates: 32°50′26″N 87°53′15″W
- NRHP reference No.: 64500009

The Plantation Houses of the Alabama Canebrake and Their Associated Outbuildings Multiple Property Submission is a multiple property submission of properties that were together listed on the National Register of Historic Places. The multiple property submission covers plantation properties that are within the Alabama Canebrake. The National Park Service has determined that all are historically or architecturally significant as a surviving group of plantation structures in what was once one of the wealthiest areas of the state.

| Resource Name | Also known as | Coordinates | City | County | Added | Notes |
|---|---|---|---|---|---|---|
| Allen Grove | | 32°25′44″N 87°46′30″W | Old Spring Hill | Marengo County | July 7, 1994 | |
| Altwood | | 32°25′26″N 87°40′28″W | Faunsdale | Marengo County | July 13, 1993 | Moved |
| Augusta Sledge House | Morrisette-Tunstall-Sledge House | 32°31′11″N 87°34′8″W | Newbern | Hale County | July 7, 1994 | Demolished |
| Battersea | | 32°30′37″N 87°42′11″W | Prairieville | Hale County | July 7, 1994 | |
| Bermuda Hill | Liver House | 32°31′48″N 87°41′39″W | Prairieville | Hale County | July 7, 1994 | Threatened |
| Borden Oaks | | 32°43′4″N 87°41′21″W | Greensboro | Hale County | July 7, 1994 | |
| Cedar Crest | | 32°25′41″N 87°39′37″W | Faunsdale | Marengo County | August 5, 1993 | |
| Cedar Grove Plantation | Charles Walker House | 32°26′51″N 87°34′31″W | Faunsdale | Marengo County | July 13, 1993 | |
| Cedar Haven | | 32°24′56″N 87°35′20″W | Faunsdale | Marengo County | July 13, 1993 | Demolished |
| Cuba Plantation | | 32°26′28″N 87°39′7″W | Faunsdale | Marengo County | July 13, 1993 | |
| Faunsdale Plantation | | 32°26′7″N 87°36′7″W | Faunsdale | Marengo County | July 13, 1993 | |
| Hawthorne | Browder Place | 32°30′50″N 87°41′59″W | Prairieville | Hale County | July 7, 1994 | Threatened |
| Kerby House | Randolph Plantation | 32°30′21″N 87°41′14″W | Prairieville | Hale County | July 7, 1994 | |
| Payne House | Atkin's Ridge | 32°41′26″N 87°34′36″W | Greensboro | Hale County | July 7, 1994 | |
| Roseland Plantation | | 32°26′40″N 87°34′3″W | Faunsdale | Marengo County | January 20, 1994 | House demolished, some outbuildings remain |
| Waldwic | | 32°29′3″N 87°42′56″W | Gallion | Marengo County | July 22, 1994 | |
| William Poole House | William Cade Thompson House | 32°20′58″N 87°38′41″W | Dayton | Marengo County | July 7, 1994 | |

== See also ==
- National Register of Historic Places Multiple Property Submissions in Alabama
- National Register of Historic Places listings in Hale County, Alabama
- National Register of Historic Places listings in Marengo County, Alabama
