= Faunsdale Plantation =

Historic house in Alabama, United States

- U.S. National Register of Historic Places
- U.S. Historic district
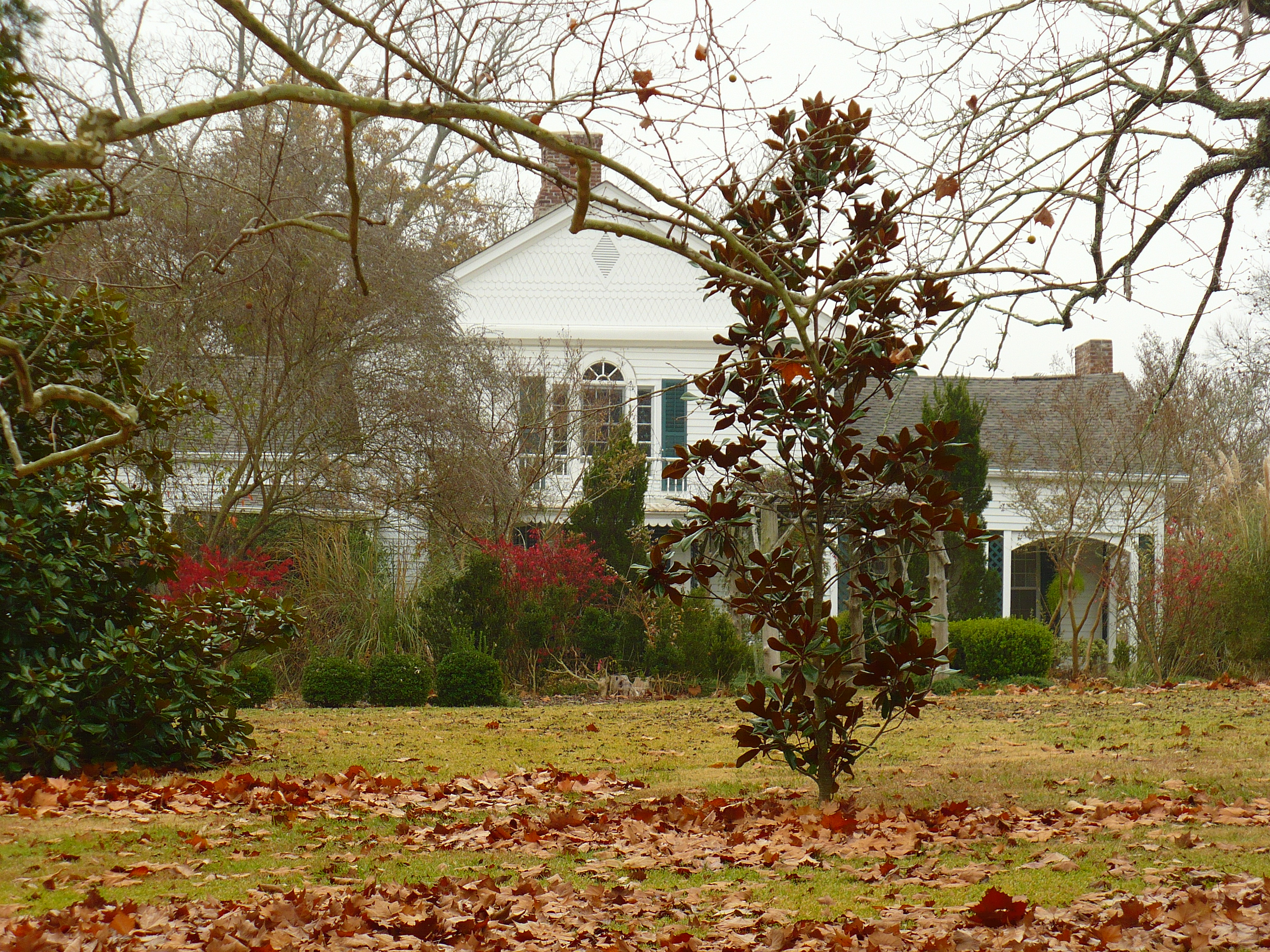
- The main house at Faunsdale Plantation in 2008

- Location within Alabama Location within the United States
- Location: near Faunsdale, Alabama
- Coordinates: 32°26′7.26″N 87°36′9.28″W
- Area: 13 acres (5.3 ha)
- Built: 1844
- Architectural style: Greek Revival, Carpenter Gothic
- MPS: Plantation Houses of the Alabama Canebrake and Their Associated Outbuildings MPS
- NRHP reference No.: 93000602
- Added to NRHP: July 13, 1993

Faunsdale Plantation is a historic slave plantation near the town of Faunsdale, Alabama, United States. This plantation is located in the Black Belt, a section of the state developed for cotton plantations. Until the U.S. Civil War, planters held as many as 186 enslaved African Americans as laborers to raise cotton as a commodity crop.

A number of the workers' former cabins remain standing, and they are among the most significant examples of slave housing in Marengo County. These cabins are also among the last remaining examples of this building type in the state of Alabama.

The house was added to the National Register of Historic Places on July 13, 1993, as a part of the historic district associated with the Plantation Houses of the Alabama Canebrake and Their Associated Outbuildings Multiple Property Submission.

== Description of house and cabins ==
The plantation house at Faunsdale Plantation is a simple Greek Revival style, two-story, wood-frame structure with a gabled roof, flanked on each side with one-story gabled wings.

The nearby one-room slave cabins date from 1860 and are also wood-frame structures. They have high-pitched gables and scalloped barge boards, which show a Carpenter Gothic influence.

== Detailed records of enslaved families ==
Faunsdale Plantation is one of the few large plantations in Alabama where detailed slave records were kept and preserved as part of the historical record. These records indicate that the Harrison family owned roughly 99 slaves in 1846, a few years after they acquired this property. Harrison is listed in the 1850 Federal Census of Marengo County as having $18,300 in property, based mostly on the value of the enslaved people he held. By 1857, the number of people enslaved at the farm had increased to 161.

A list from 1 January 1864 indicates that Harrison's widow, Louisa, enslaved 186 people, who likely comprised at least 35 families. Unusually, her records also included the surnames used by many of the enslaved people: Barron, Brown, Francis, Harison, Iredell, Mutton, Nathan, Newbern, Paine, Parsons, Richmond, Washington, and Wills. By the end of 1864, 14 of these enslaved people had died of infectious disease, ranging from typhoid fever to measles.

== History of owners and the people they held in slavery ==
The plantation was developed during the 1830s by Bird Pearson and Henry Augustine Tayloe. This area of the state had been ceded by the Choctaw to the United States by the Treaty of Fort St. Stephens in 1816. The owners used enslaved African Americans to clear and develop the lands of the Canebrake.

At this time, Tayloe was also acting as the local land agent for his brothers; located in Washington, D.C., and Virginia, they invested deeply in the Canebrake region, buying numerous plantations through him. The brothers were Benjamin Ogle Tayloe of Washington, D.C., who owned Windsor, Sidson and Meadow Hill; William Henry Tayloe of Mount Airy, Virginia, co-owner of Oakland, Adventure (later part of Cuba Plantation), and Larkin plantations; Edward Thornton Tayloe of Powhatan Plantation, co-owner of Oak Grove here; with George Plater Tayloe of Buena Vista Plantation, in Virginia. He also bought land for a nephew, Col. George E Tayloe, owner of Elmwood in Arcola, and co-owner of Walnut Grove on the Demopolis-Uniontown Road.

H. A. Tayloe and his brothers were sons of Col John Tayloe III, a wealthy Virginia planter who built the Octagon House in Washington, D.C., for his use in the city. Their grandfather was Colonel John Tayloe II, another wealthy planter, who developed the colonial plantation Mount Airy in Richmond County, Virginia, and had tens of thousands of acres in other farms in Virginia and Maryland. The Tayloes' extensive acquisitions in Alabama demonstrate the economic reach of wealthy planters in the Upper South, to control good lands in the Deep South. In 1947, historian J.W. Dubose wrote that the Tayloes were "considered the most important pioneer cotton planters of the Canebrake, as to the extent of their enterprise there."

In 1843, Dr. Thomas Alexander Harrison purchased 960 acres in the Canebrake from Charles City County, Virginia. According to Dubose's 1947 account, after Harrison acquired his property, which he named Faunsdale Plantation, he no longer practiced as a doctor, but devoted himself to cotton. Harrison named his plantation after Faunus, the ancient Roman deity of the forest, plains, and fields.

As was typical of other planters, Harrison brought numerous slaves with him from Virginia. This was part of a forced migration of about one million enslaved African Americans to the Deep South as it was developed.

Harrison was said to insist on the enslaved persons saluting him, the men by raising their hats and the women by curtsies. By the 1850s, he wanted to acquire another 340 acres, but initially his neighbor, a Mr. Armstead, was not ready to sell. Harrison happened to see him one morning, when Armstead announced his imminent move to Montgomery, the state capital, to serve as United States Marshal of the District Court, under President Franklin Pierce's administration. He sold the land to Harrison that the latter wanted.

About 1855 Harrison also bought land in Louisiana near the Mississippi River. The bottomland had dense underbrush and trees, and he sent a work party of enslaved people there to start clearing the property.

Mrs. Louisa Harrison was described as an educated woman, taught privately by a governess and tutor while growing up at her family's plantation of Edenton, Virginia, as was typical for girls of her class. She later attended a girls' boarding school in New York for seven years. Dr. and Mrs. Harrison had one child together, a daughter Louise. As an adult, she married her cousin, William B. Shepard of Edenton.

After being widowed, Mrs. Harrison built a chapel at Faunsdale for use by the enslaved workers. Her example was followed by other planters in the area: the widow Mrs. McRae of the Athol plantation, also built a slave chapel; both Mr. Bocock of the Waldwic plantation and Mr. Terrell of the Brame plantation also provided them for the people they enslaved. In 1864 the widowed Louisa Harrison married again, to Rev. Stickney, Episcopal minister of St. Michael's. They lived at Faunsdale.

== St. Michael’s Church ==
In 1844 Harrison and his wife, Louisa, gave 1-acre (4,000 m^{2}) of their plantation for construction of a log church across from their house. In 1846, Alabama's first Episcopal bishop, Nicholas Hamner Cobbs, visited Faunsdale Plantation. He noted that Louisa Harrison gave regular instruction to her slaves by reading the church services to them and teaching the catechism to their children.

In 1852 the church was renamed as St. Michael's Episcopal Church. By 1855 the log structure had been replaced by a Gothic Revival-style church building, with likely all the skilled labor provided by enslaved African Americans.

A churchyard for burials was established in 1858; Dr. Harrison was the first interment. Beginning in 1860, enslaved persons and, later, freedmen who lived on the plantation were also buried in this churchyard. The church building was moved to the town of Faunsdale in 1888. It was destroyed by a tornado in 1932. The churchyard on the plantation grounds continued to be used as an active burial ground.

St. Andrew's Episcopal Church in nearby Prairieville was built in part by slaves held by H. A. Tayloe.

== Gallery ==
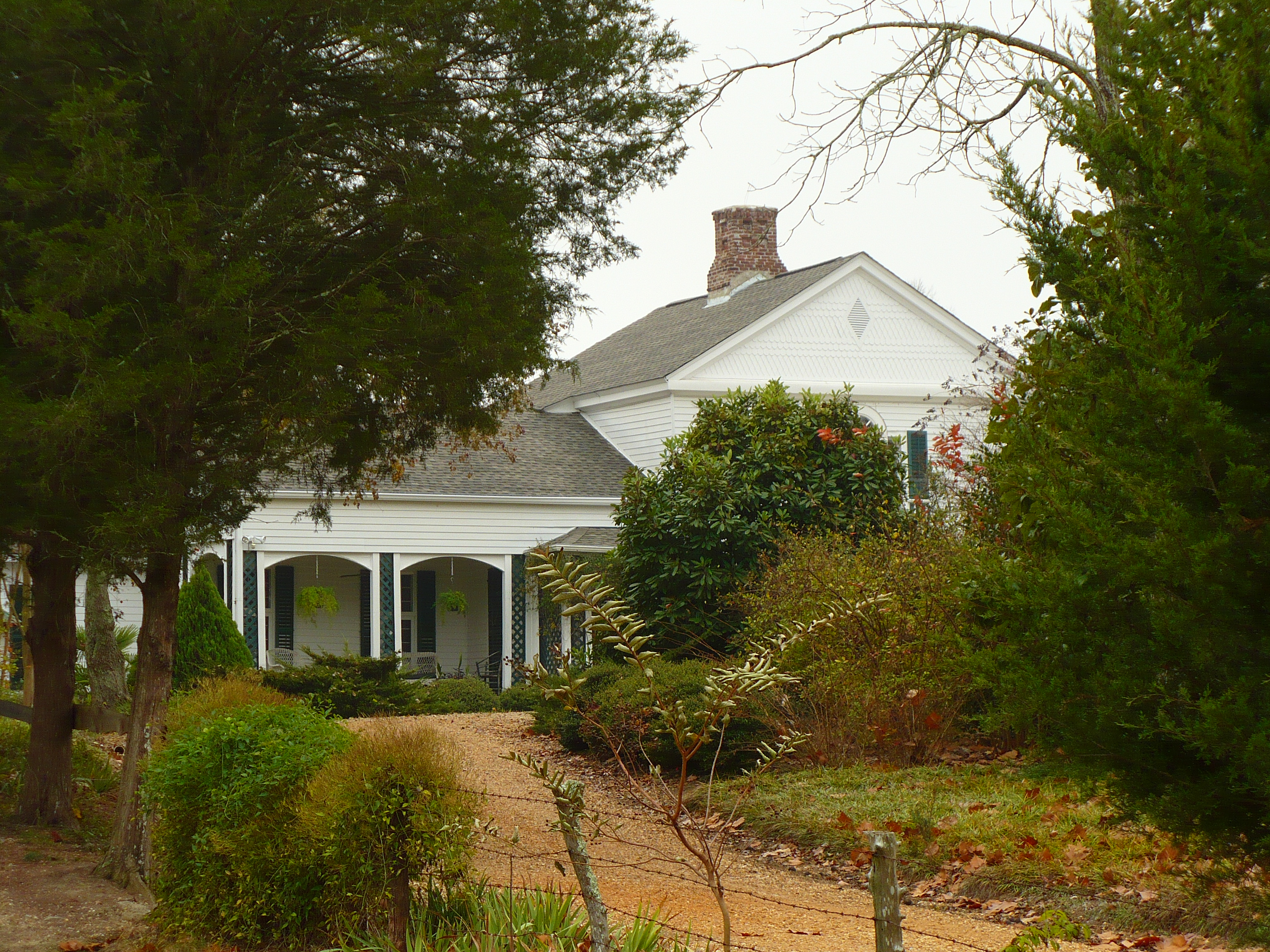
A portion of the front elevation of the Greek Revival main house in 2008

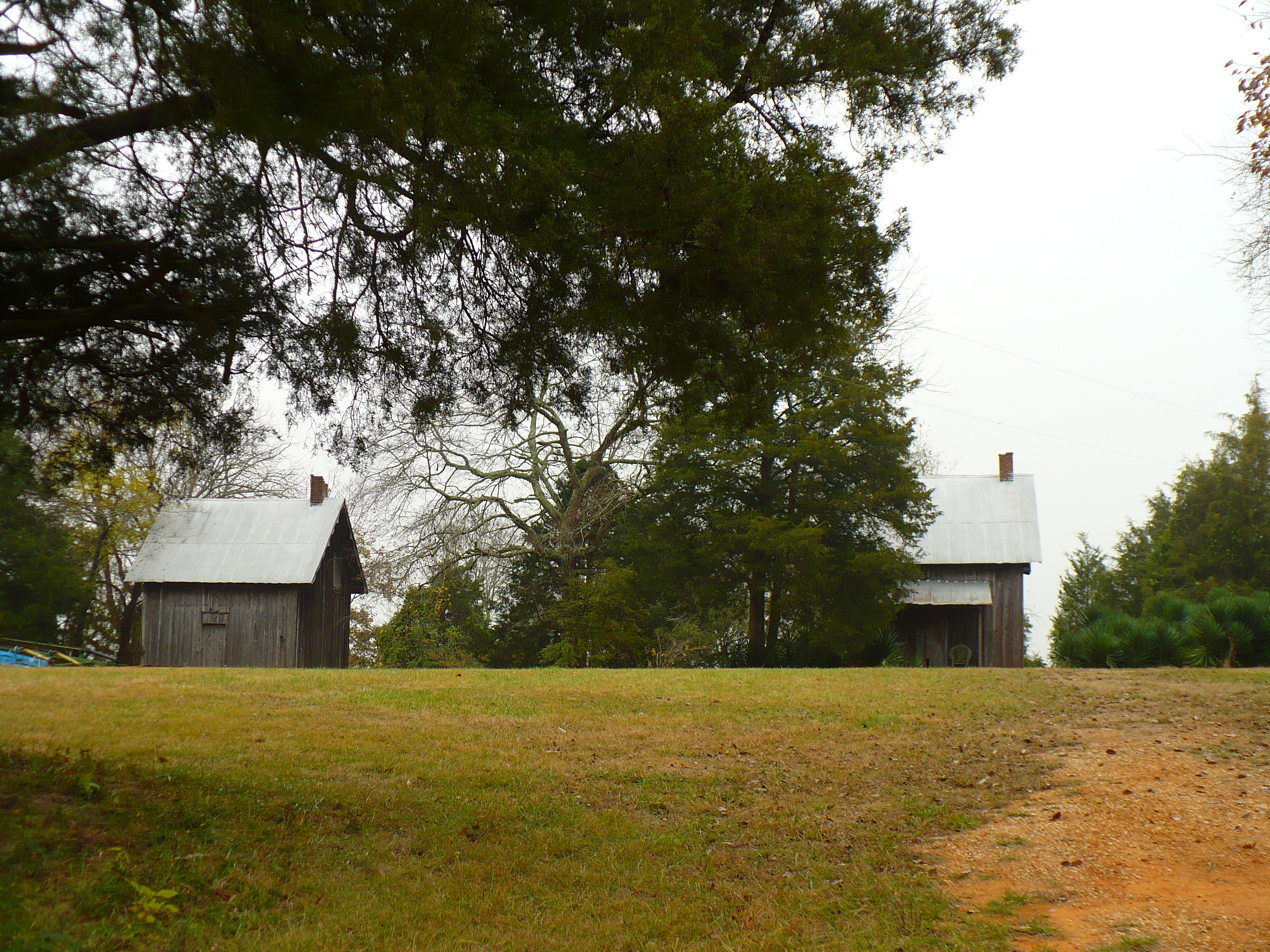
Slave quarters in 2008

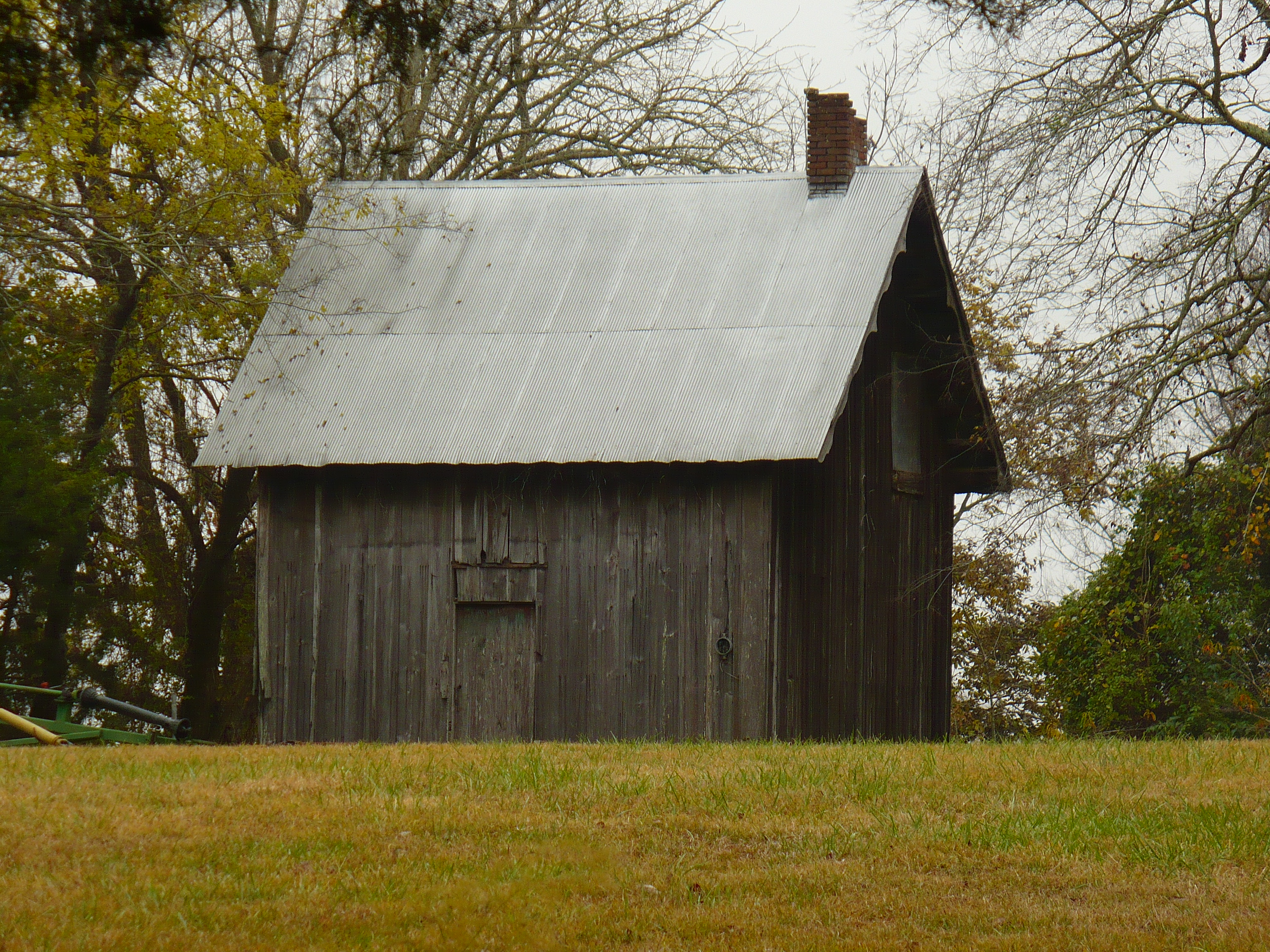
Detail of one of the slave quarters, built in the Carpenter Gothic style
