= Locust Lawn =

Locust Lawn may refer to:

- Locust Lawn Estate, 19th century farm complex in New Paltz, New York
- Locust Lawn, now Borden Oaks, a plantation on the National Register of Historic Places near Greensboro, Alabama
- Locust Lawn (Oxford, North Carolina), a tobacco plantation house included on the National Register of Historic Places
