= Allen Grove (Alabama) =

Historic house in Alabama, United States

- U.S. National Register of Historic Places
- U.S. Historic district
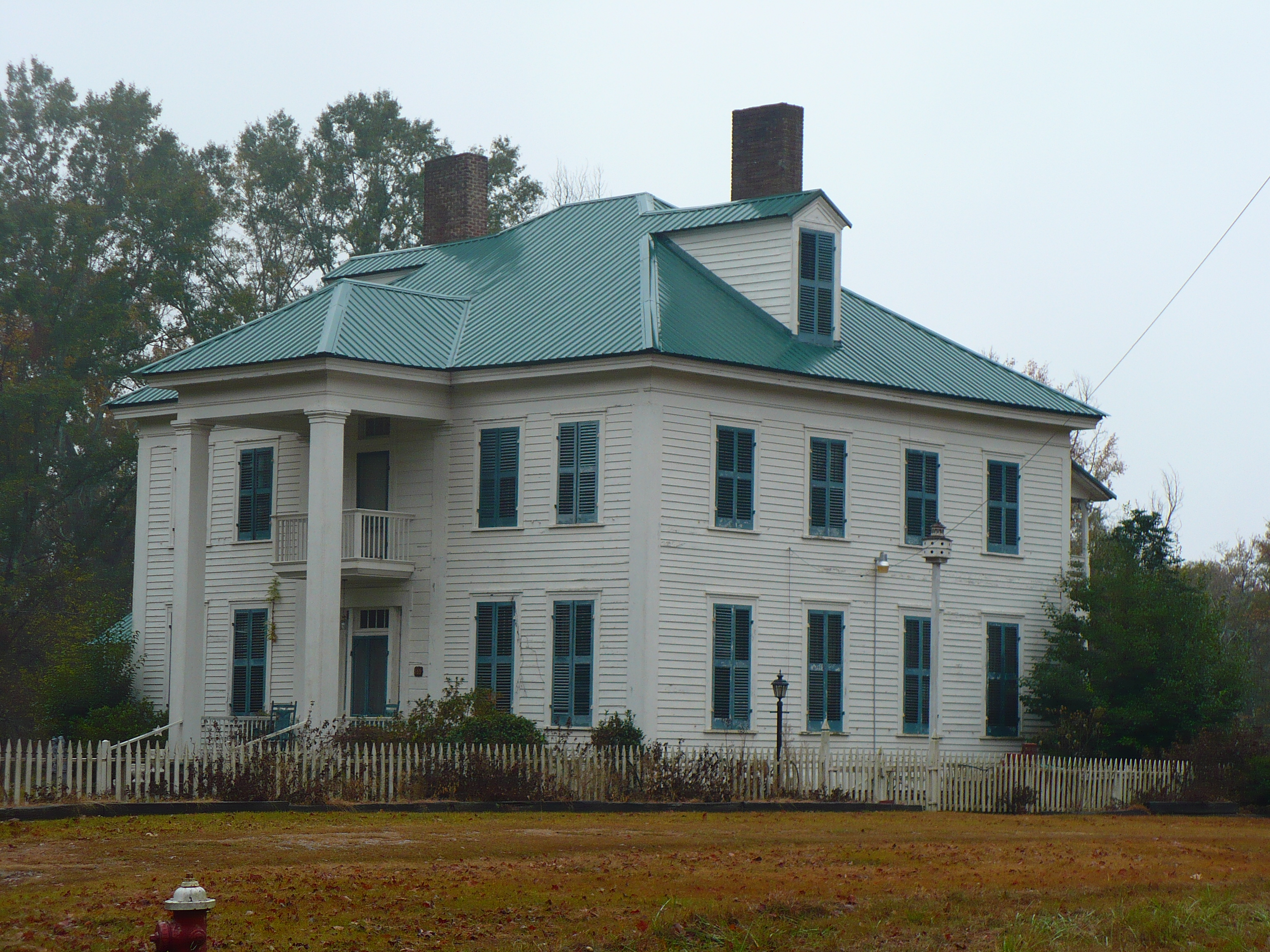
- Allen Grove in 2008

- Location within Alabama Location within the United States
- Nearest city: Old Spring Hill, Alabama
- Coordinates: 32°25′44″N 87°46′30″W
- Area: 50 acres (200,000 m^{2})
- Built: 1857
- Architect: Rudisill, David
- Architectural style: Greek Revival
- MPS: Plantation Houses of the Alabama Canebrake and Their Associated Outbuildings Multiple Property Submission
- NRHP reference No.: 94000689
- Added to NRHP: July 7, 1994

Allen Grove is a plantation house and historic district located in Old Spring Hill, Alabama. The Greek Revival house was built for John Gray Allen in 1857 by David Rudisill. It is a two-story frame structure with a two-story front portico featuring square paneled columns. The roof is hipped with side dormers. In 1890 the rear facade was altered when a kitchen and pantry wing and a two-story back porch was added. The house and two other plantation buildings were added to the National Register of Historic Places on July 7, 1994, as a part of the Plantation Houses of the Alabama Canebrake and Their Associated Outbuildings Multiple Property Submission.
