= Sarah Byrd Askew =

American librarian

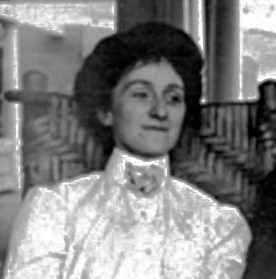
- in Atlantic City in 1909
- Born: February 15, 1877; Dayton, Alabama
- Died: October 20, 1942 (aged 65); Trenton, New Jersey
- Occupation: Librarian
- Known for: County libraries in the United States

Sarah Byrd Askew (February 15, 1877 – October 20, 1942) was an American public librarian who pioneered the establishment of county libraries in the United States. A prominent librarian during the first half of the 20th century, she worked for (and eventually led) the New Jersey Public Library Commission for 37 years.

== Early life and education ==
Sarah Byrd Askew was born on February 15, 1877, in Dayton, Alabama, to Thyrza (born Pickering) and Samuel Horton Askew. She attended Dayton Academy and graduated from high school in Atlanta. After attending business school, she found employment as a stenographer for a brief time, but after working temporarily at Cleveland Public Library in Ohio while visiting her sister, decided to pursue librarianship. She attended the Pratt Institute's School of Information and Library Science in New York and graduated in 1904.

== Career ==
The New Jersey Public Library Commission hired Askew on January 1, 1905, assigning her to travel among the state's libraries to introduce them to modern library practice and to set up a summer training program for New Jersey librarians. She was to be their "organizer and missionary" to "get libraries going," as there were only 66 libraries in the state at that time. With the exception of her time as a reference librarian at the New Jersey State Library in Trenton from 1909 to 1915, Askew worked for the New Jersey Public Library Commission for the entirety of her career. There, she established a county library program, created as a regional approach to serve towns that could not support local libraries on their own. She eventually oversaw the establishment of 12 county libraries herself.

Askew worked to increase the effectiveness of public libraries. In 1906, she founded a summer school for the staff of small libraries to share knowledge and skills. Concerned with providing books to rural areas still without a local or county library, Askew began sending "traveling libraries" - shipments of around 300 books - to community buildings throughout the state. She began shipping specific collections to libraries in New York and Connecticut by 1913, an early example of interlibrary loan. In 1920, Askew designed one of the earliest bookmobiles in the US, driving her Ford Model T to carry materials to people who did not have access to a library. During World War I, Askew organized a program to send books overseas to military camps and hospitals; during World War II, she helped to organize a Victory Book Campaign. She wrote frequently and published scholarly articles and books, including The Place, the Man and the Book (1916).

Throughout her career, she was supported in her cause by the State Teachers' Association, the Federation of Women's Clubs, state and local grange groups, and others. Askew served as president of the New Jersey Library Association (1913–14 and 1939–40), vice-president of the American Library Association (1938–39), chairwoman of children's reading for the National Congress of Parents and Teachers (1924–29), and was a member of the Trenton Board of Education (1923–33). In recognition of her accomplishments, the New Jersey College for Women (later Douglass College) at Rutgers University conferred an honorary doctorate of library science upon Askew in 1930. The campus library at William Paterson University was named in her honor for some time.

Askew worked for the commission until her death in 1942 and resided in Trenton, New Jersey. By 1942, there were 316 local libraries in the state of New Jersey.

== Honors ==
In 1951, Library Journal named Askew to its Library Hall of Fame. The New Jersey Library Association awards an annual scholarship in Askew's honor.

== Publications ==
- The Place, the Man, and the Book (published by H. W. Wilson Co., 1916) available as a Google Book
