= Kerby House =

Historic house in Alabama, United States

- U.S. National Register of Historic Places
- U.S. Historic district
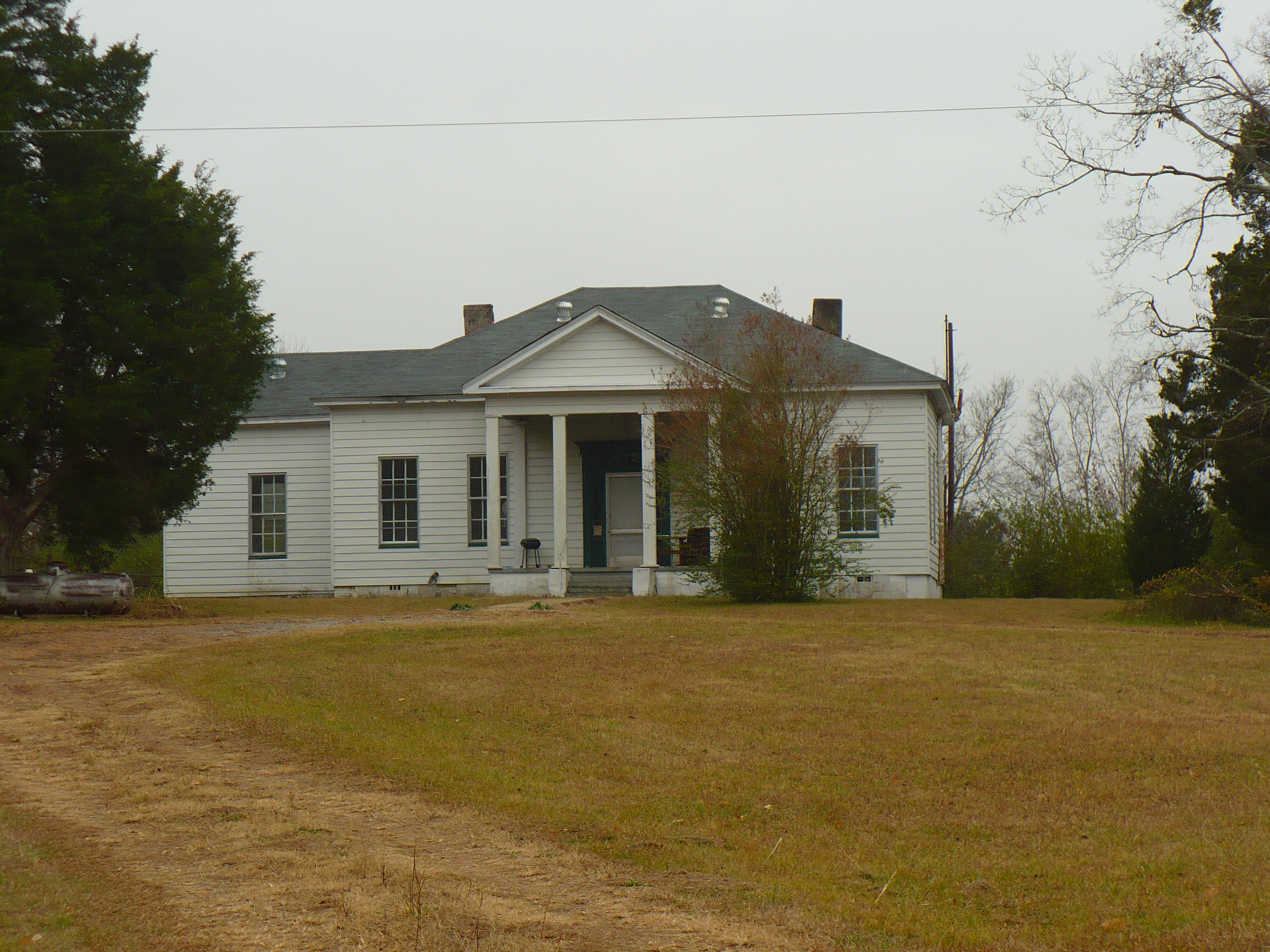
- The Kerby House in 2008

- Location within Alabama Location within the United States
- Nearest city: Prairieville, Alabama
- Coordinates: 32°30′21″N 87°41′14″W
- Built: 1850
- Architectural style: Greek Revival
- MPS: Plantation Houses of the Alabama Canebrake and Their Associated Outbuildings Multiple Property Submission
- NRHP reference No.: 94000697
- Added to NRHP: July 07, 1994

The Kerby House, also known as the Randolph Plantation, is a historic Greek Revival plantation house and historic district in Prairieville, Alabama, United States. This area of Hale County was included in Marengo County before the creation of Hale in 1867. The Kerby House was built in 1850 by the Randolph family. The main block is a one-story structure with a five-bay facade. A one-story wing joins the main block on the eastern side. The central bay is covered by a pedimented portico, supported by four simple box columns. The entrance door surround is in the Greek Revival-style. It is included in the Plantation Houses of the Alabama Canebrake and Their Associated Outbuildings Multiple Property Submission. The property was added to the National Register of Historic Places on July 7, 1994, due to its architectural and historical significance.
