= Cedar Crest (Faunsdale, Alabama) =

Historic house in Alabama, United States

- U.S. National Register of Historic Places
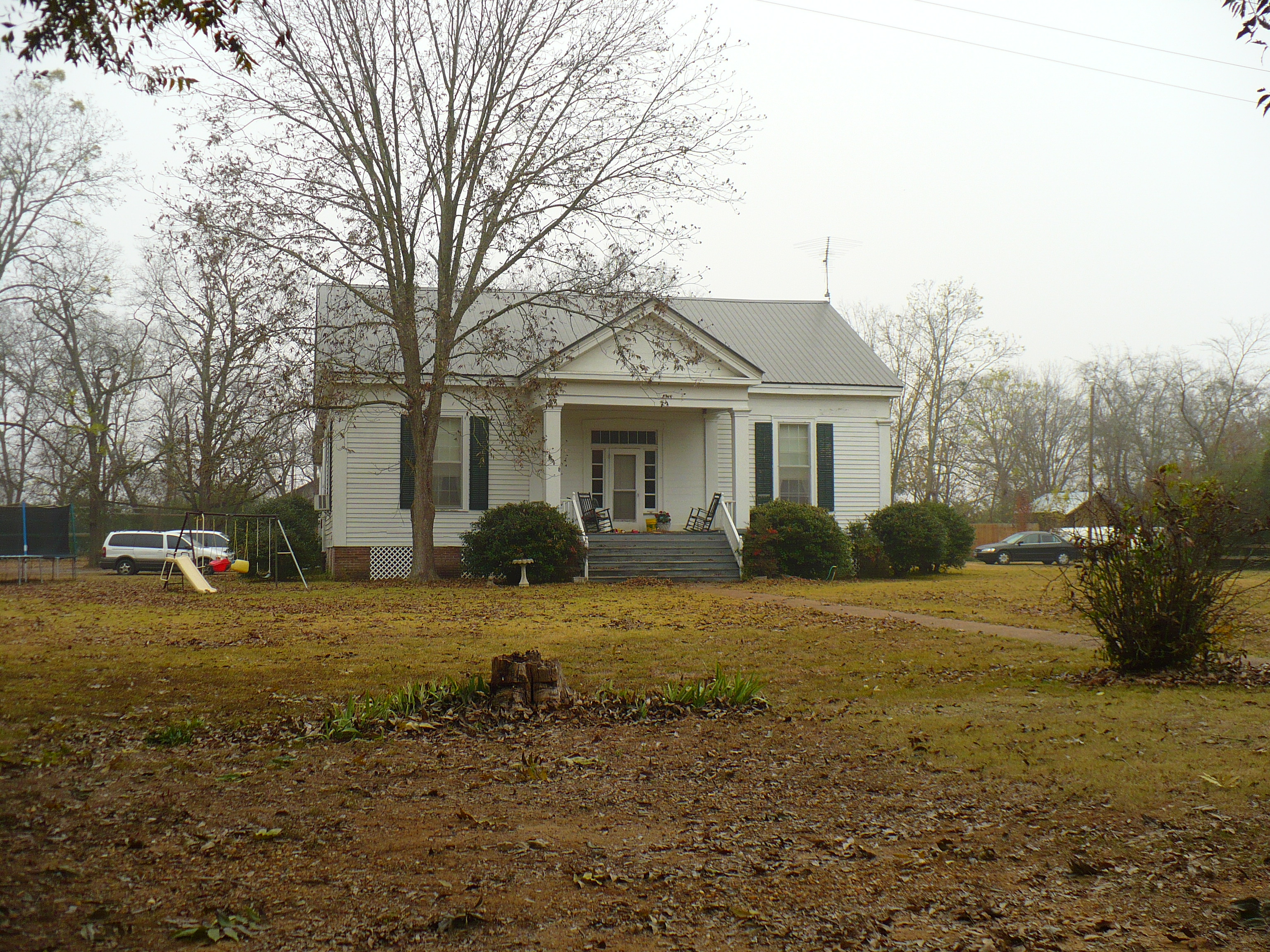
- Cedar Crest plantation house in 2008

- Location within Alabama Location within the United States
- Nearest city: Faunsdale, Alabama
- Coordinates: 32°25′41″N 87°39′37″W
- Built: 1850
- Architectural style: Greek Revival
- MPS: Plantation Houses of the Alabama Canebrake and Their Associated Outbuildings Multiple Property Submission
- NRHP reference No.: 93000763
- Added to NRHP: August 5, 1993

Cedar Crest, also known as Cedar Crest Farms, is a Greek Revival plantation house located near Faunsdale, Alabama. It was built for Kimbrough Cassels Dubose in 1850 by Albert Prince, a slave. Dubose, born in Darlington District, South Carolina was educated at the preparatory school of Prof. Stafford who later was of the faculty of the University of Alabama. His wife was Miss Elizabeth Boykin Witherspoon also of Darlington District, South Carolina, and they had seven sons and four daughters: John Witherspoon, James Henry Jr., Eugene, Nicholas William, Francis Marion, Lemuel Benton and Edwin Dargan-the daughters Louisa, Rosalie, Augusta and Adele. The plantation was worked by the forced labor of as many as 130 enslaved persons. The house is one-and-a-half stories with side gables, but has been simplified. It originally had side wings, with adjoining porches across the front. These were removed in 1939, leaving the small central front portico. Another historic plantation house, Altwood, was moved from a nearby location to the Cedar Crest grounds in 1988. The house was added to the National Register of Historic Places on August 5, 1993, as a part of the Plantation Houses of the Alabama Canebrake and Their Associated Outbuildings Multiple Property Submission.

Kimbrough Dubose's son John Witherspoon Dubose, author of "Chronicles of the Canebrake," resided at "Cedar Grove" as he referred to it from February 1850 until December 1876.
