= Bermuda Hill =

Historic house in Alabama, United States

- U.S. National Register of Historic Places
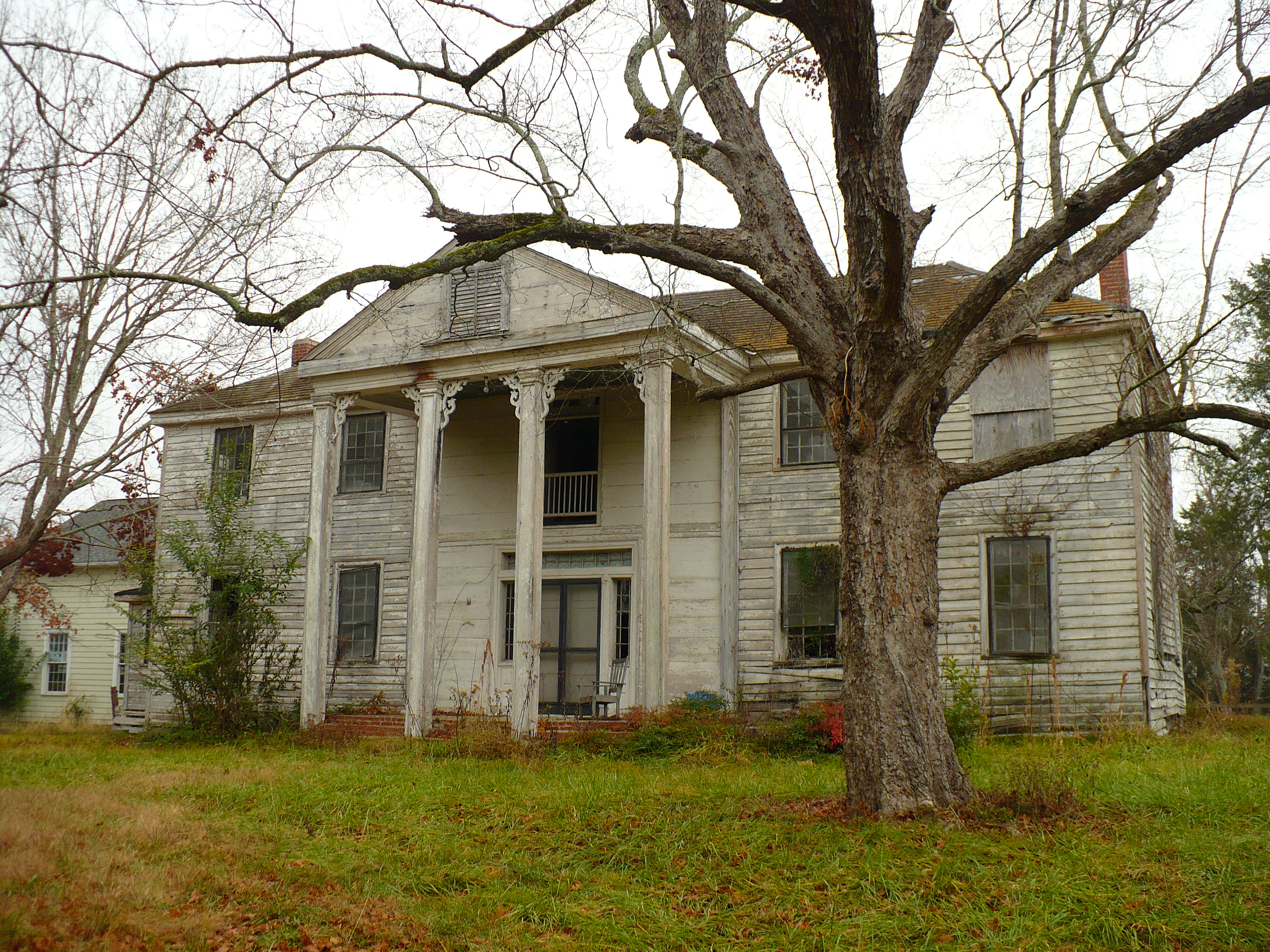
- Bermuda Hill in 2008

- Location within Alabama Location within the United States
- Nearest city: Prairieville, Alabama
- Coordinates: 32°31′48″N 87°41′39″W
- Built: 1845
- Architectural style: Greek Revival
- MPS: Plantation Houses of the Alabama Canebrake and Their Associated Outbuildings Multiple Property Submission
- NRHP reference No.: 94000692
- Added to NRHP: July 7, 1994

Bermuda Hill, also known as the Liver House, is a historic plantation house in Hale County, Alabama, near Prairieville, United States. It was added to the National Register of Historic Places on July 7, 1994, as a part of the Plantation Houses of the Alabama Canebrake and Their Associated Outbuildings Multiple Property Submission.

The vernacular Greek Revival structure that exists today is an example of the I-house form, with an earlier two-story log dogtrot house incorporated within its weather-boarded exterior. The Manning family first owned the property. The Mannings were early settlers and planters in Prairieville and owned large land tracts in the original French grants of the Vine and Olive Colony. In 1845, William W. Manning sold the land to William Weeden of Madison County. It is unclear whether Manning or Weeden built the house. It had been acquired by Dr. James Daniel Browder, owner of nearby Hawthorne by the time of the Confederate-era Assessment of Taxes on Real Estate in Marengo County for 1863. Bermuda Hill has had some alterations over time, one of which was the removal of the second floor balcony under the portico. It was placed on Alabama's Places in Peril in 2011, but new owners purchased the home and completed a full restoration in 2013.

Gallery
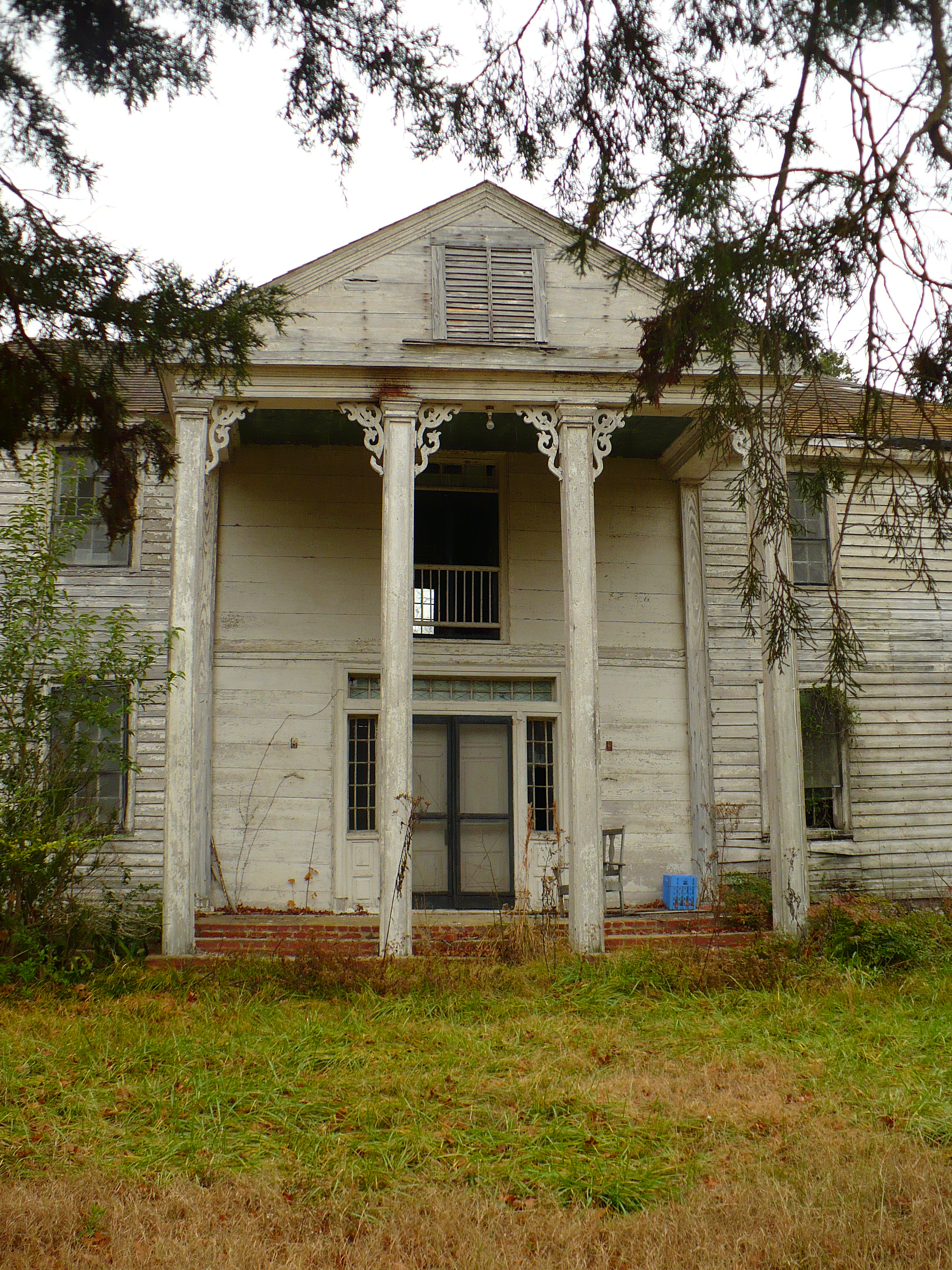
The portico in 2008

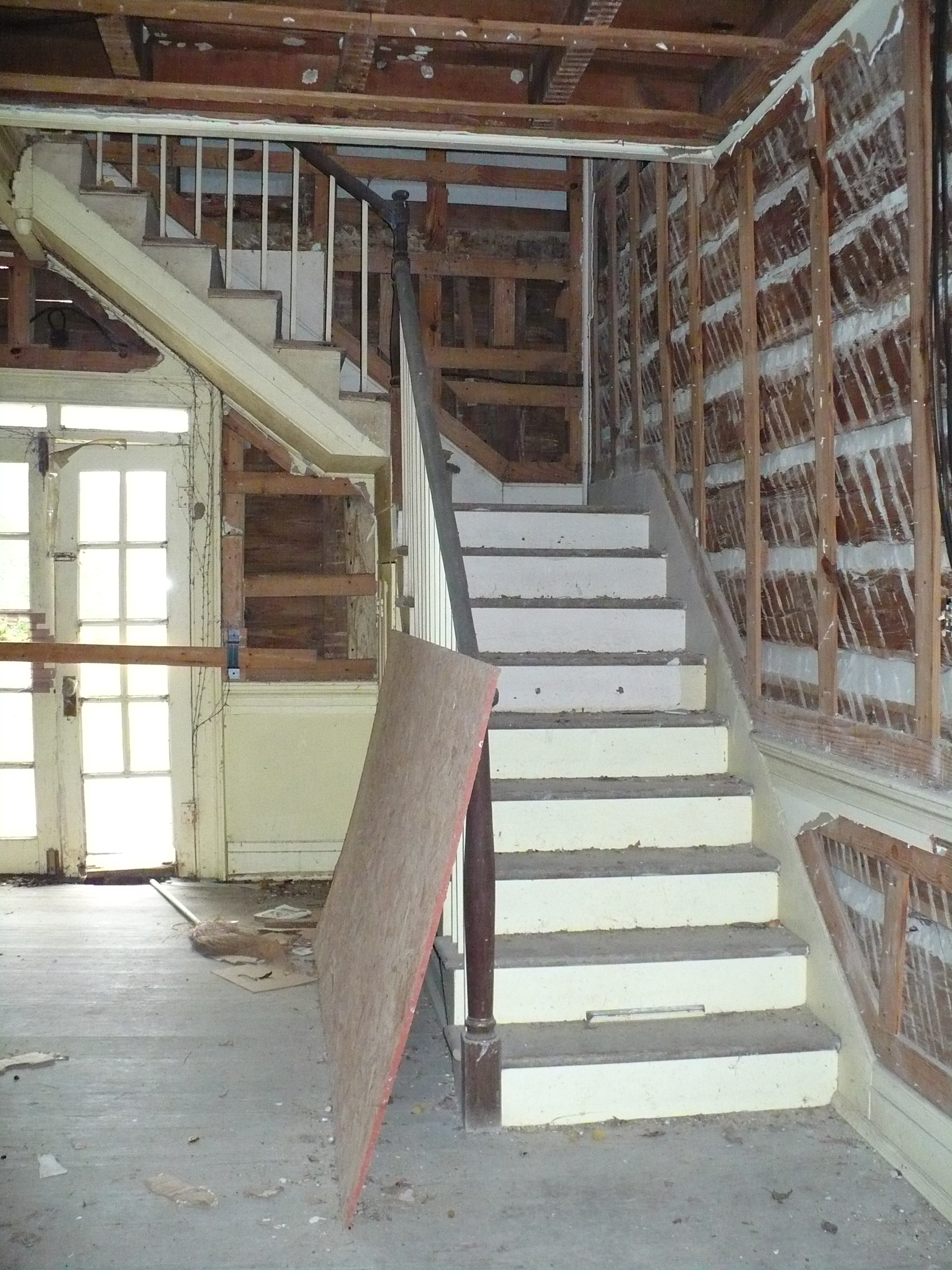
The entrance hall in 2008, taken through front side-light

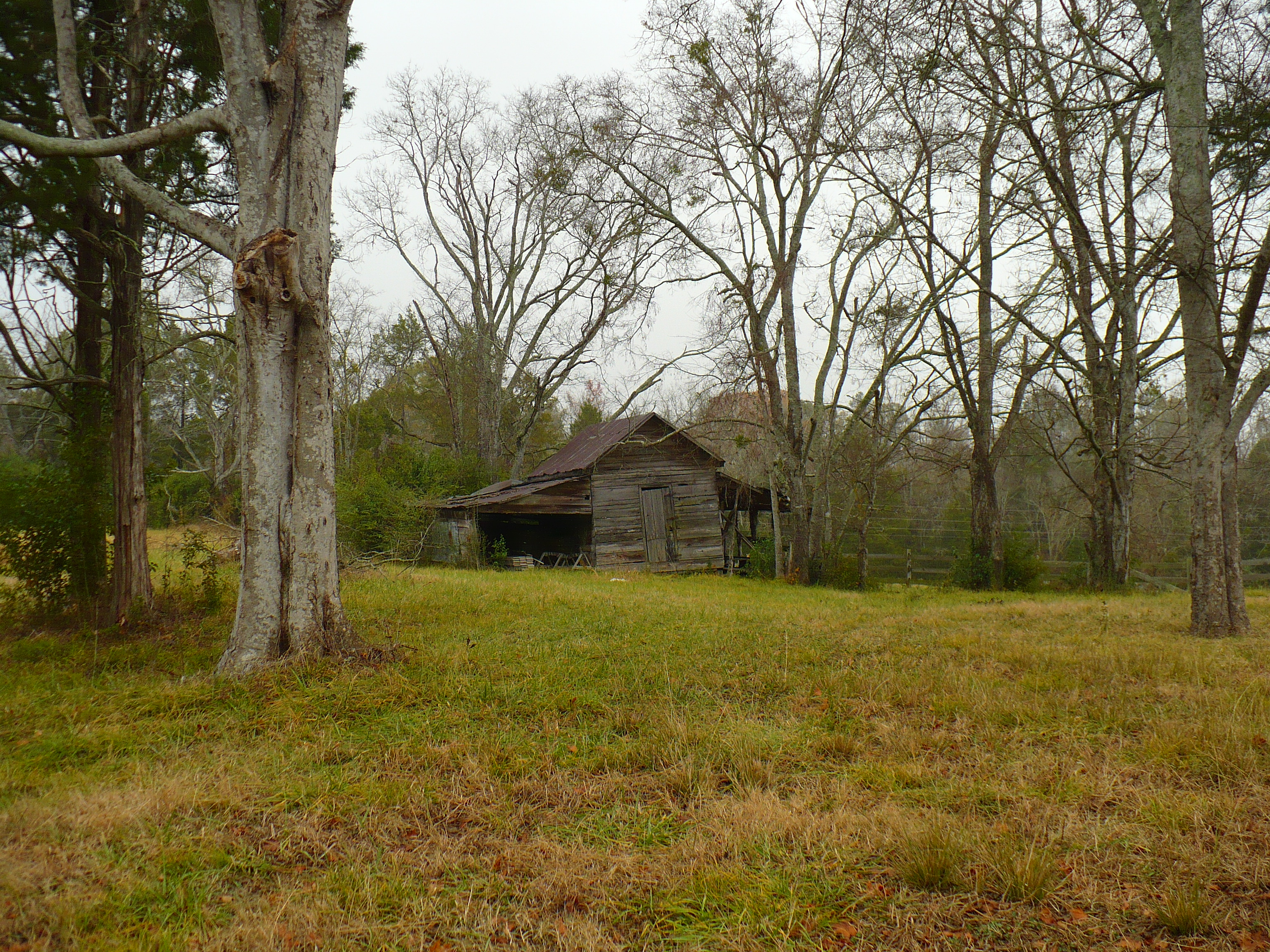
An outbuilding in 2008
