= Richard H. Clarke =

American politician (1843–1906)

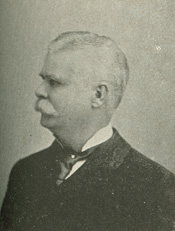
- Clarke in 1896

Member of the U.S. House of Representatives from Alabama's 1st district
- In office March 4, 1889 – March 3, 1897
- Preceded by: James T. Jones
- Succeeded by: George W. Taylor

Member of the Alabama House of Representatives
- In office 1900-1901

Personal details
- Born: James Taylor Jones; February 9, 1843 Dayton, Alabama
- Died: September 26, 1906 (aged 63) St. Louis, Missouri
- Party: Democratic

Richard Henry Clarke (February 9, 1843 – September 26, 1906) was a politician who served as a U.S. representative from Alabama.

== Biography ==
Born in Dayton, Alabama, Clarke attended Green Springs Academy. He graduated from the University of Alabama at Tuscaloosa in July 1861. He soon enlisted in the Confederate States Army, and during the Civil War was a lieutenant in the First Battalion of Alabama Artillery.

After the war, Clarke studied law and passed the bar in 1867; he commenced practice in Dayton, Alabama.

He moved to Demopolis, Alabama, and continued to work as a lawyer. There he was elected as State Solicitor for Marengo County, serving from 1872 to 1876. He was the prosecuting attorney of the seventh judicial circuit in 1876 and 1877.

He moved to Mobile, Alabama, where he resumed a law practice.

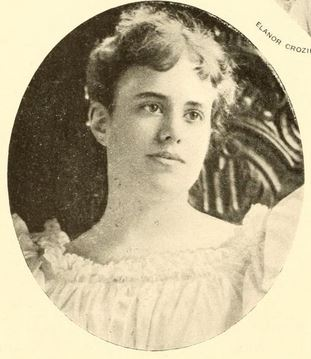
Helen Gaines Clarke

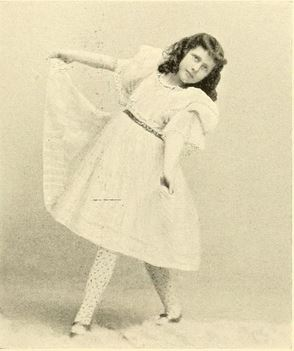
Mary Morris Clarke

=== Marriage and family ===
In 1877 he married Helen Gaines Foot, a native of Mobile. Her father, C. K. Foot, was a native of Vermont, and a descendant of Nathaniel Foote, one of the early settlers of Wethersfield, Connecticut. Her mother was Sarah Lyons, of Mobile, of the distinguished Pendleton and Gaines families. His wife spent her early years in Mobile, but she later attended school in New York City.

Their daughters, Helen Gaines and Mary Morris Clarke, resembled their mother in face and manner.

=== Later political career ===
Clarke was elected as a Democrat from Alabama's 1st congressional district to the Fifty-first and to the three succeeding Congresses (March 4, 1889 – March 3, 1897). He was not a candidate for renomination, as he ran in 1896 for governor. He was not successful.

Clarke resumed the practice of law in Mobile. He was elected to the State House of Representatives in 1900 and 1901.

He died in St. Louis, Missouri, on September 26, 1906. His body was returned to Mobile, where he was buried in Magnolia Cemetery.

U.S. House of Representatives
| Preceded by James T. Jones | Member of the U.S. House of Representatives from Alabama's 1st congressional district 1889–1897 | Succeeded by George W. Taylor |
