= Battersea (Prairieville, Alabama) =

Historic house in Alabama, United States

- U.S. National Register of Historic Places
- U.S. Historic district
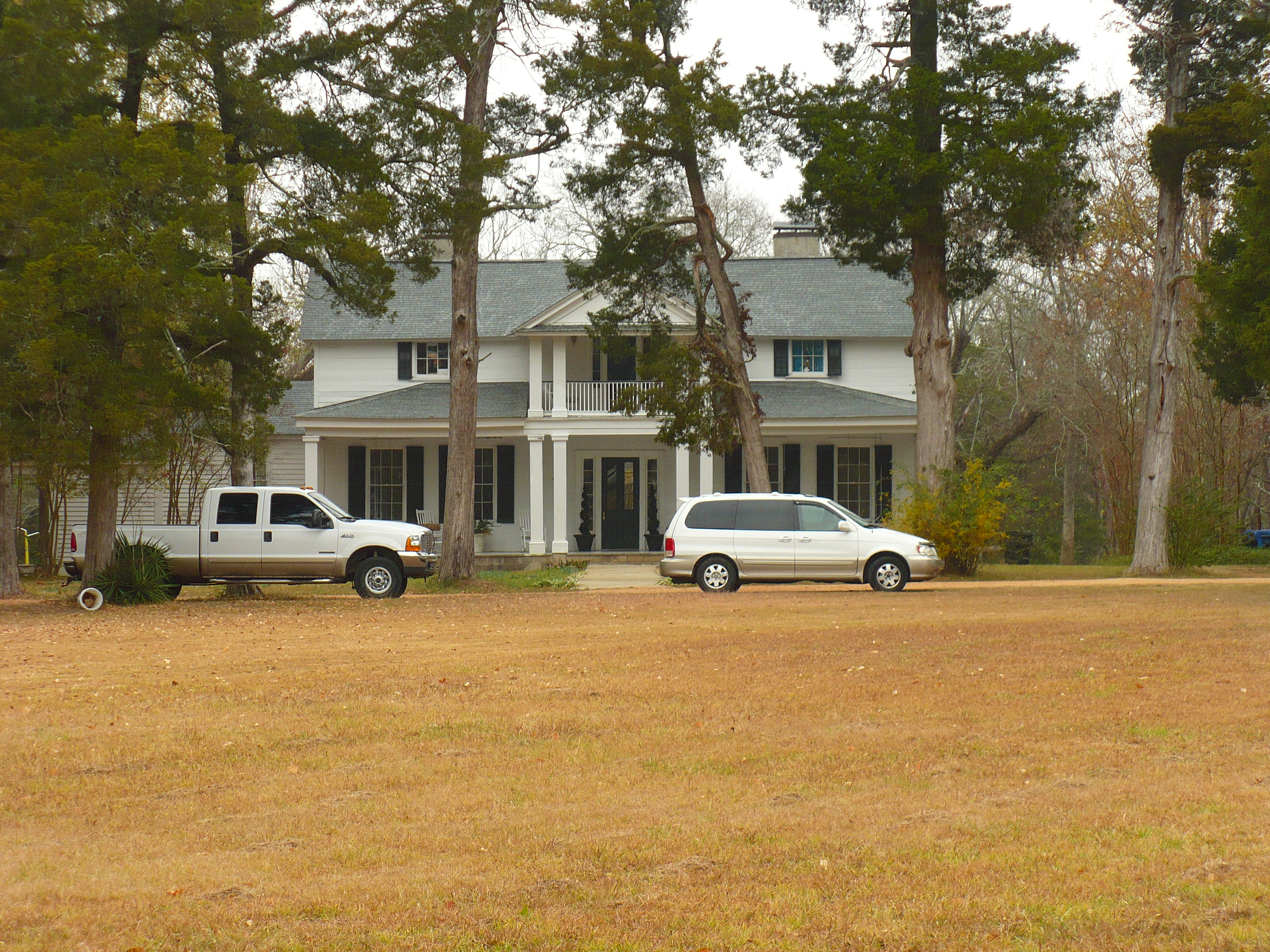
- Battersea in 2008

- Location within Alabama Location within the United States
- Nearest city: Prairieville, Alabama
- Coordinates: 32°30′37″N 87°42′11″W
- Built: 1845
- Architectural style: mid-19th Century Revival
- MPS: Plantation Houses of the Alabama Canebrake and Their Associated Outbuildings Multiple Property Submission
- NRHP reference No.: 94000698
- Added to NRHP: July 7, 1994

Battersea is a historic plantation house in Prairieville, Alabama, United States. The house was built from 1820 to 1845 by the Vaughan family from Petersburg, Virginia and served as an early stagecoach stop. It was added to the National Register of Historic Places as a historic district on July 7, 1994, as a part of the Plantation Houses of the Alabama Canebrake and Their Associated Outbuildings Multiple Property Submission.
