= Roseland Plantation =

Historic house in Alabama, United States

- U.S. National Register of Historic Places
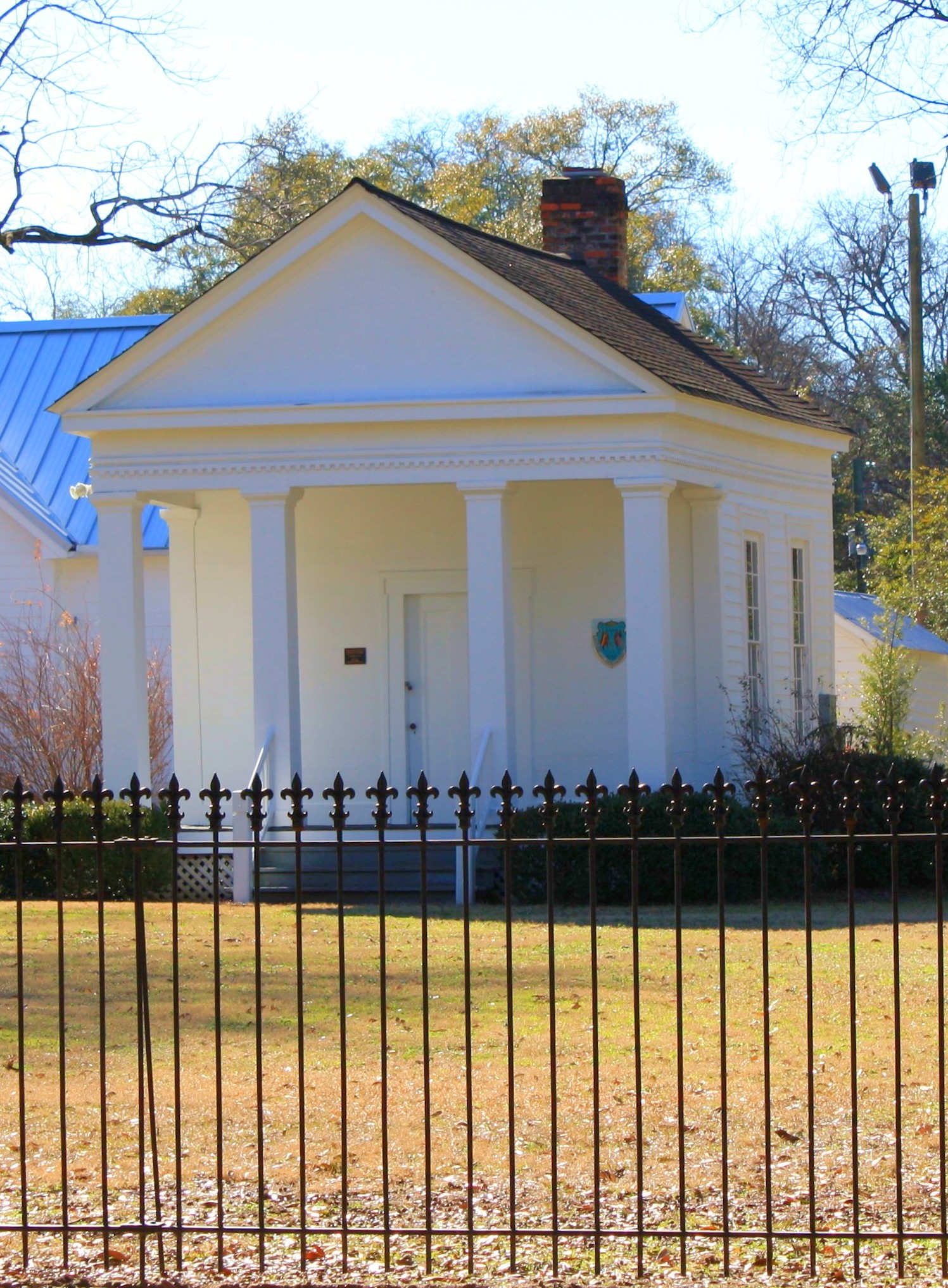
- The Roseland Apothecary Office, now at Sturdivant Hall

- Location within Alabama Location within the United States
- Nearest city: Faunsdale, Alabama
- Coordinates: 32°26′26.40″N 87°34′13.02″W
- Built: 1835, mid-1850s
- Architectural style: Greek Revival
- MPS: Plantation Houses of the Alabama Canebrake and Their Associated Outbuildings Multiple Property Submission
- NRHP reference No.: 93001476
- Added to NRHP: January 20, 1994

Roseland Plantation is a historic plantation complex site in Faunsdale, Alabama. The site is situated on a low hill at the end of a long driveway on the overgrown estate. It was added to the National Register of Historic Places on January 20, 1994, as a part of the Plantation Houses of the Alabama Canebrake and Their Associated Outbuildings Multiple Property Submission.

== History ==
Roseland Plantation originally was the home of "Judge" James Harris Fitts and his wife Rebecca Emily Alston - both of them were born in Warren County NC. Following Mr. Fitts' death (by an employee) the eldest son occupied the home, Samuel Alston Fitts. He was born on May 15, 1815, in Alabama. "Judge" James Fitts and his wife Rebecca had a total of ten children, with at least three dying before reaching 20 years of age. The ninth child, named James Harris Fitts (married to Mary Elizabeth Burges) matured to Tuscaloosa where he founded J.H. Fitts Banking House in 1862. He also was on the Board of Trustees of The University of Alabama and the Treasurer for the U.A. for forty years. He was an vigorous advocate for the UA his entire adult life. James Fitts (the father) had established Roseland as a 1,200-acre (490 ha) plantation in the Canebrake region of Marengo County during the late 1820s, but was murdered by a discharged overseer on July 16, 1832. His death left Samuel, at the age of eighteen, in charge of caring for his mother and eight brothers and sisters.

Samuel Fitts married Sarah Elizabeth Alston of neighboring Clarke County on November 29, 1838. Her parents were William Williams Alston and Mary Haywood Burges, also originally from North Carolina. Fitts had made the plantation a success by 1860, with property valued at $95,000. By this point Roseland was worked by at least 67 slaves.

== Architecture ==
The plantation house at Roseland Plantation began as a dogtrot house in 1835. A large two-story Greek Revival-style frame addition was added to the front of the dogtrot in the mid-1850s. The former front porch of the dogtrot became a cross-hall and the breezeway of the dogtrot was extended into a very long center-hall in the new construction. The upper floor was accessed from the central hallway via a reverse staircase.

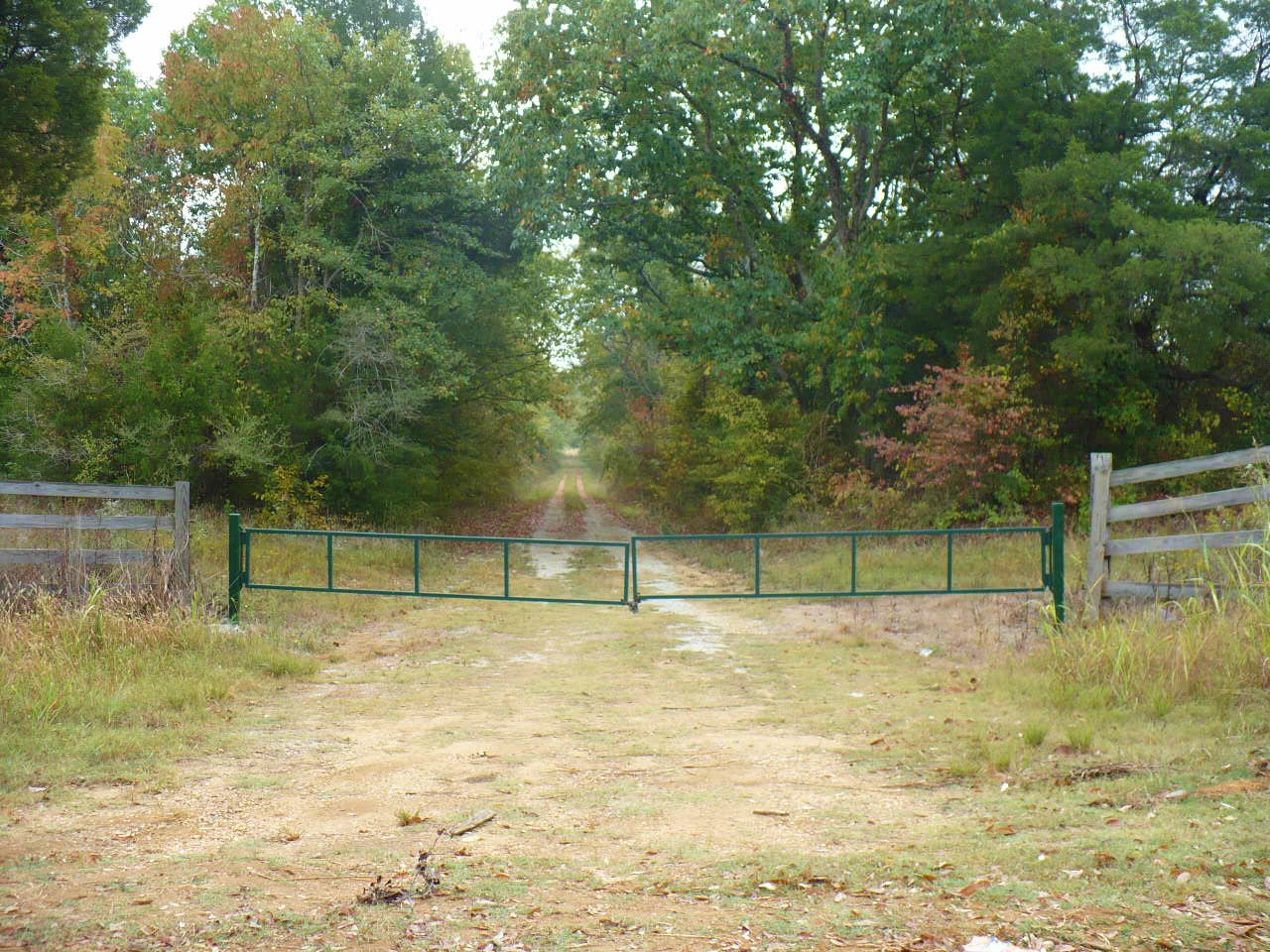
Entrance drive to the Roseland site.

The main house and most of the outbuildings have been demolished by neglect, but the largely undisturbed site remains important for archaeological reasons. A dairy cooler and the original log kitchen do remain at the site. A survey done in 1993, prior to its nomination to the National Register, indicated that the main house was in ruins with only a few walls remaining.

At the time of the survey a small Greek Revival plantation office had already been removed to another location. Known as the "apothecary", it was used for dispensing medicine to the plantation's slaves. The property owners gave it to the Sturdivant Museum Association and it was moved to the grounds of Sturdivant Hall in Selma in order to ensure its preservation. A large seven-seat privy at Roseland, dating from the 1850s, was also donated to the Sturdivant Museum Association in 1979, but was not relocated to Sturdivant Hall until 2005.
