= William Poole House =

Historic house in Alabama, United States

- U.S. National Register of Historic Places
- U.S. Historic district
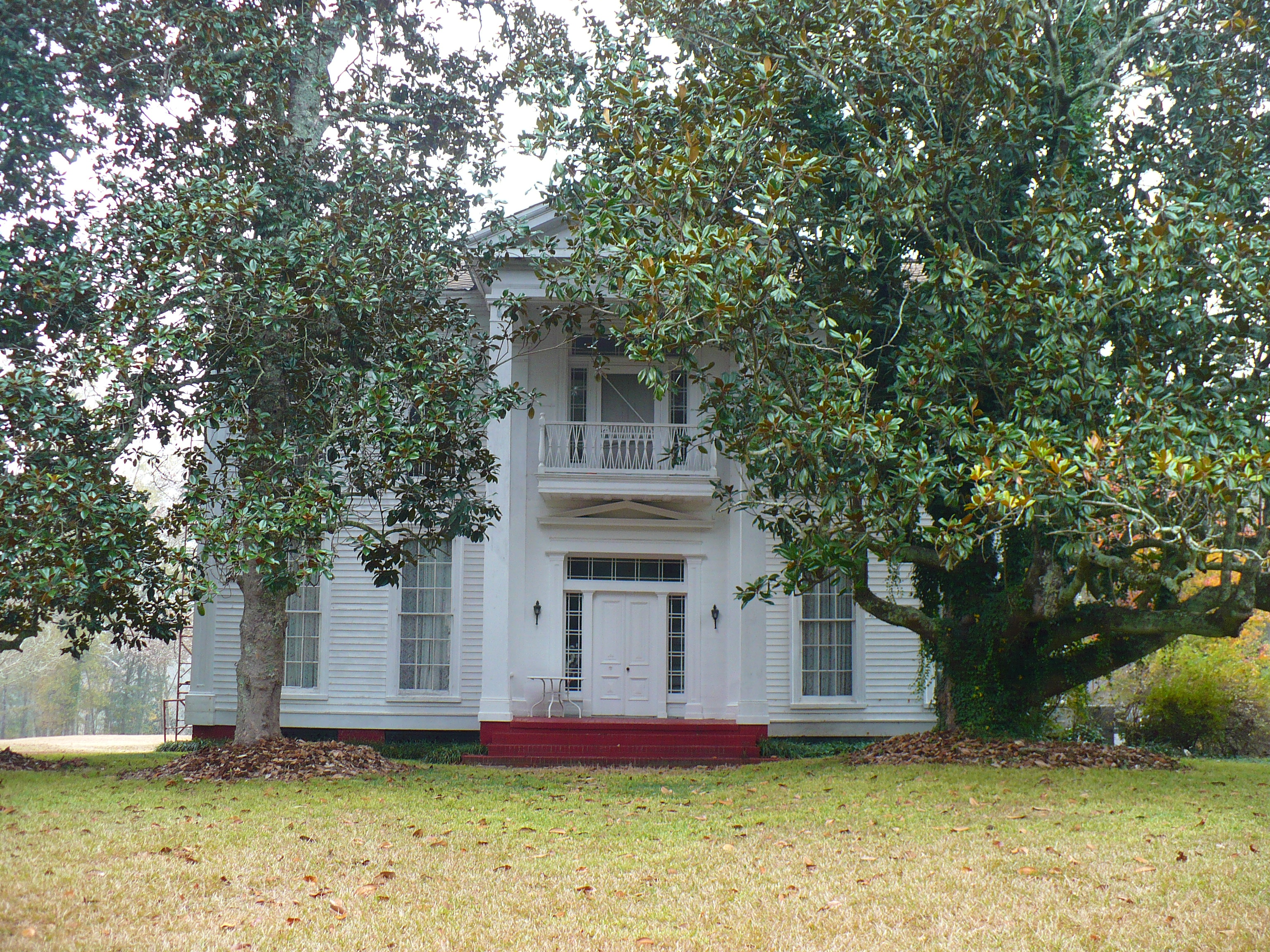
- The William Poole House in 2008

- Location within Alabama Location within the United States
- Nearest city: Dayton, Alabama
- Coordinates: 32°20′58″N 87°38′41″W
- Built: 1848
- Architectural style: Greek Revival
- MPS: Plantation Houses of the Alabama Canebrake and Their Associated Outbuildings Multiple Property Submission
- NRHP reference No.: 94000687
- Added to NRHP: July 7, 1994

The William Poole House, also known as the William Cade Thompson House, is a historic plantation house and historic district in Dayton, Alabama. The Greek Revival style house was completed in 1848. It and the surrounding grounds were added to the National Register of Historic Places on July 7, 1994, as a part of the Plantation Houses of the Alabama Canebrake and Their Associated Outbuildings Multiple Property Submission.

== History ==
The house was built by John D. Catlin for his ward, Sarah Altona Terrell, and her husband, William Cade Thompson. He had it built as a wedding gift and to serve as their residence following their marriage on August 10, 1847. Catlin was one of Alabama's first millionaires, owning three plantations, a townhouse, and 179 slaves in 1850. The house remained in the Thompson family for less than a decade, with William Thompson dying on May 25, 1854, and Sarah following him on July 6, 1856. The house was then purchased by the Browning family, who held it until it was sold to the Watlington family in September 1882. They, in turn, sold it to David Miller Prowell on July 14, 1917. It remained in that family until 1959. The house was then acquired by Robert and Sarah Billings of Birmingham, wno called it "Magnolia Mound" and used it as a country retreat. It was purchased by Mr. and Mrs. William Poole in 1978. The Pooles completed an extensive restoration of the home. In overall form the house is a typical two-story "I" house of the Deep South, bisected by high-ceilinged hallways above and below. A single-story, two-room ell extends to the rear, separated from the main block by a breezeway-like hallway terminated at each end by wide double doors opening onto flanking rear galleries. This original arrangement has been modified by later renovations. An unusual architectural feature of the house is the striking height of the windows above and below. Second-floor windows, reaching nearly to the floor, are fitted inside with curved "baby-catcher" railings to prevent a fatal fall from one of the two upstairs bedrooms.
