= Augusta Sledge House =

Historic house in Alabama, United States

- U.S. National Register of Historic Places
- U.S. Historic district
- The house in 1993

- Location within Alabama Location within the United States
- Nearest city: Newbern, Alabama
- Coordinates: 32°31′11″N 87°34′8″W
- Built: 1855
- MPS: Plantation Houses of the Alabama Canebrake and Their Associated Outbuildings Multiple Property Submission
- NRHP reference No.: 94000686
- Added to NRHP: July 7, 1994

The Augusta Sledge House, also known as the Morrisette-Tunstall-Sledge House, was a historic plantation house and historic district near Newbern, Alabama, US. The main house was built in 1855 and is an example of the cottage orné style, which was at the height of its popularity in the mid-19th century. The property is included in the Plantation Houses of the Alabama Canebrake and Their Associated Outbuildings Multiple Property Submission. It was added to the National Register of Historic Places on July 7, 1994, due to its architectural and historical significance. It was razed circa 2010.
