= Payne House (Greensboro, Alabama) =

Historic house in Alabama, United States

- U.S. National Register of Historic Places
- U.S. Historic district
- Location within Alabama Location within the United States
- Nearest city: Greensboro, Alabama
- Coordinates: 32°41′26″N 87°34′36″W
- Built: 1840
- Architectural style: Mid 19th Century Revival
- MPS: Plantation Houses of the Alabama Canebrake and Their Associated Outbuildings Multiple Property Submission
- NRHP reference No.: 94000690
- Added to NRHP: July 7, 1994

The Payne House, formally known as Atkins' Ridge, is a historic raised Greek Revival cottage near Greensboro, Alabama, US.

== History ==
The house was built by John Atkins in 1840. It was purchased by Pascal Tutwiler, Sr. in 1911 and remained in the Tutwiler family until 1971, when it was bought by Dr. James H. Payne, who restored it.

The house is included as part of the Plantation Houses of the Alabama Canebrake and Their Associated Outbuildings Multiple Property Submission. It was added to the National Register of Historic Places on July 7, 1994, due to its architectural significance.
