= St. Andrew's Episcopal Church (Prairieville, Alabama) =

Historic church in Alabama, United States

- St. Andrew's Church
- U.S. National Register of Historic Places
- U.S. National Historic Landmark
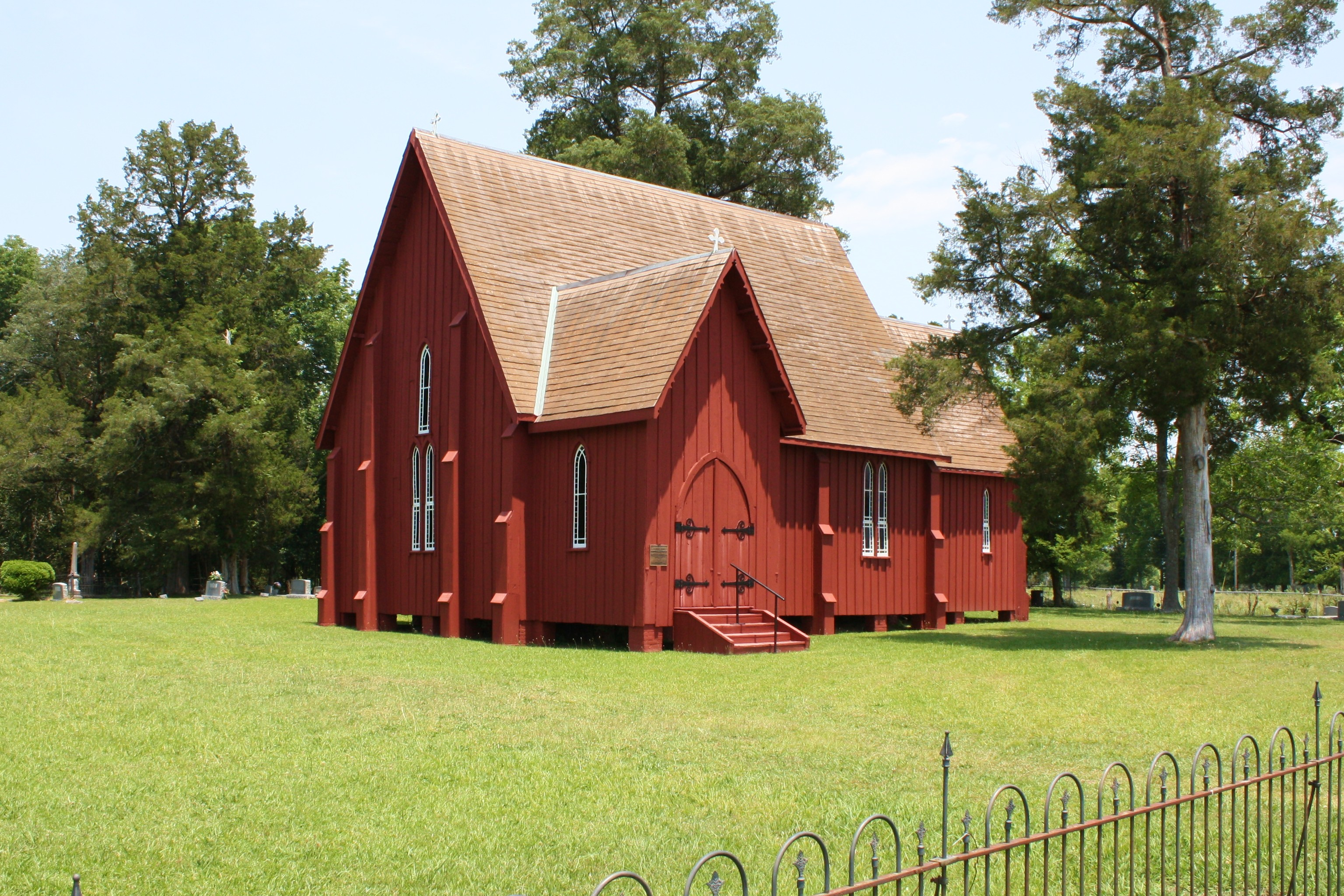
- St. Andrew's in 2011

- Location within Alabama Location within the United States
- Location: County Hwy 12, Prairieville, Alabama
- Coordinates: 32°30′38.99″N 87°42′5.03″W
- Area: 3 acres (1.2 ha)
- Built: 1853
- Architectural style: Carpenter Gothic
- NRHP reference No.: 73000347

Significant dates
- Added to NRHP: November 7, 1973
- Designated NHL: November 7, 1973

St. Andrew's Episcopal Church, also known as St. Andrew's Church is a historic church building on County Highway 12 in Prairieville, Alabama, United States. Built by slaves in 1853, it is a remarkably well-preserved example of Carpenter Gothic architecture, its design apparently taken from a book by Richard Upjohn. St. Andrew's was added to the National Register of Historic Places on November 7, 1973, and was declared a National Historic Landmark on the same day. Public access is allowed to this National Historic Landmark.

== Description and history ==
St. Andrew's Episcopal Church stands on 3 acres (1.2 ha) of land on the south side of County Highway 12 in the village of Prairieville. It is a single-story frame structure, basically rectangular in plan with two extensions, with a steeply pitched gabled roof. Its exterior is finished in vertical board siding, and most of its windows have pointed-arch tops, both characteristic elements of the Carpenter Gothic. The exterior is embellished by the regular placement of buttress-like projections. The main block of the church houses the nave, with an entry vestibule projecting from one side, and the vestry chamber extending from one of the ends. The entry door has large double doors, fastened by hand-wrought iron strap hinges. The interior of the church is finished in wood, to which a tobacco stain has been applied.

The church was built in 1853 by enslaved laborers of church members, under the direction of enslaved master carpenters from Henry Augustine Tayloe's nearby Gallion plantation, who would later form the community of Freetown. Tayloe served as Secretary of the Alabama Diocesan Episcopal Convention, and had been appointed to canvass the state to build up a Bishop's Fund. The church appears to have been built from a design in the book Rural Architecture by architect Richard Upjohn.

The church congregation was founded in 1834, and this was its first church. It was formally consecrated in 1858, and drew parishioners, both free and slave, from surrounding counties. The congregation declined after the American Civil War led to a decline in population. The building continues to be maintained by the Episcopal Diocese of Alabama, with occasional services.

In 2023 restoration work at the church was undertaken.

== Gallery ==
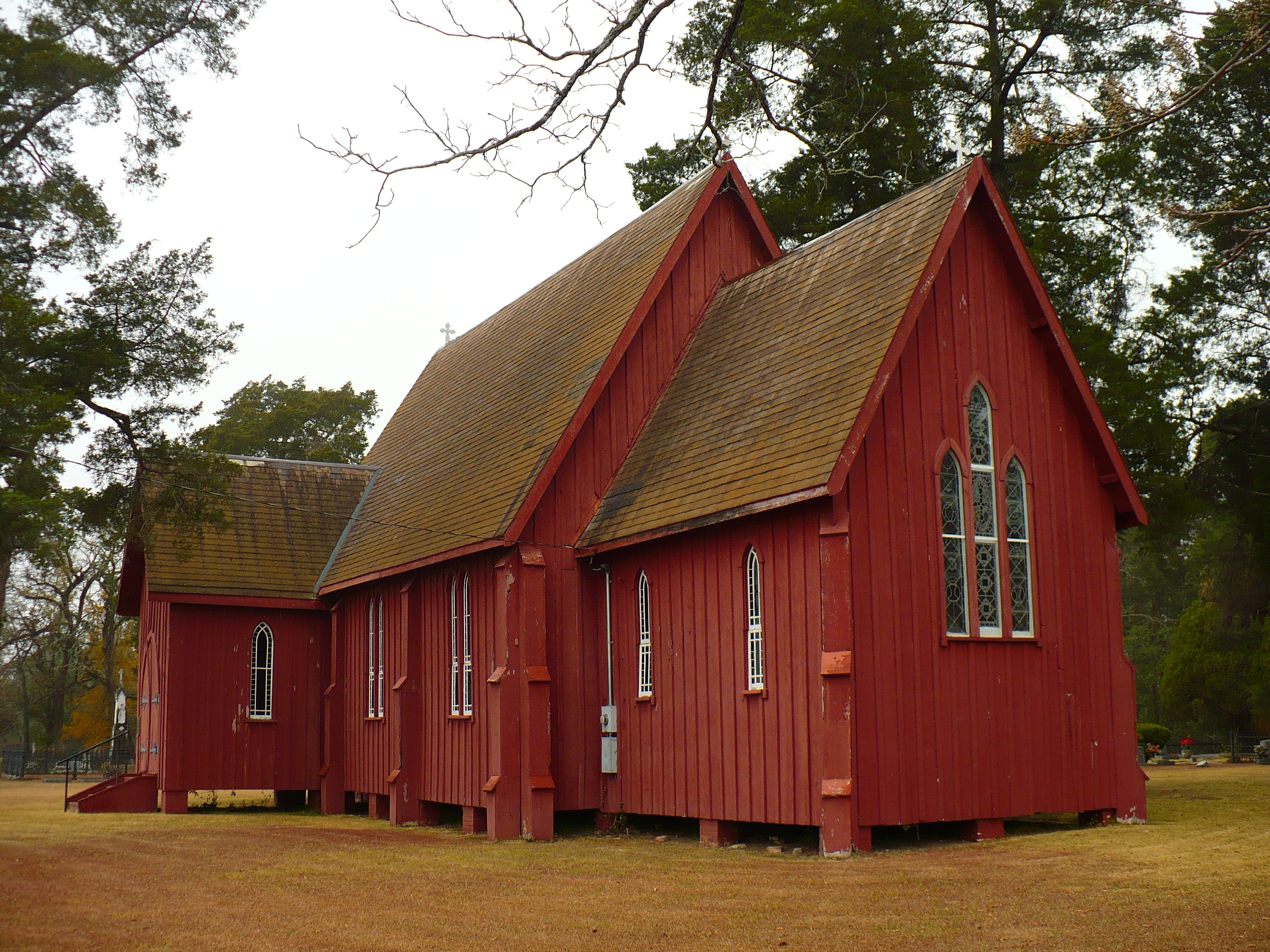
View from the east in 2008

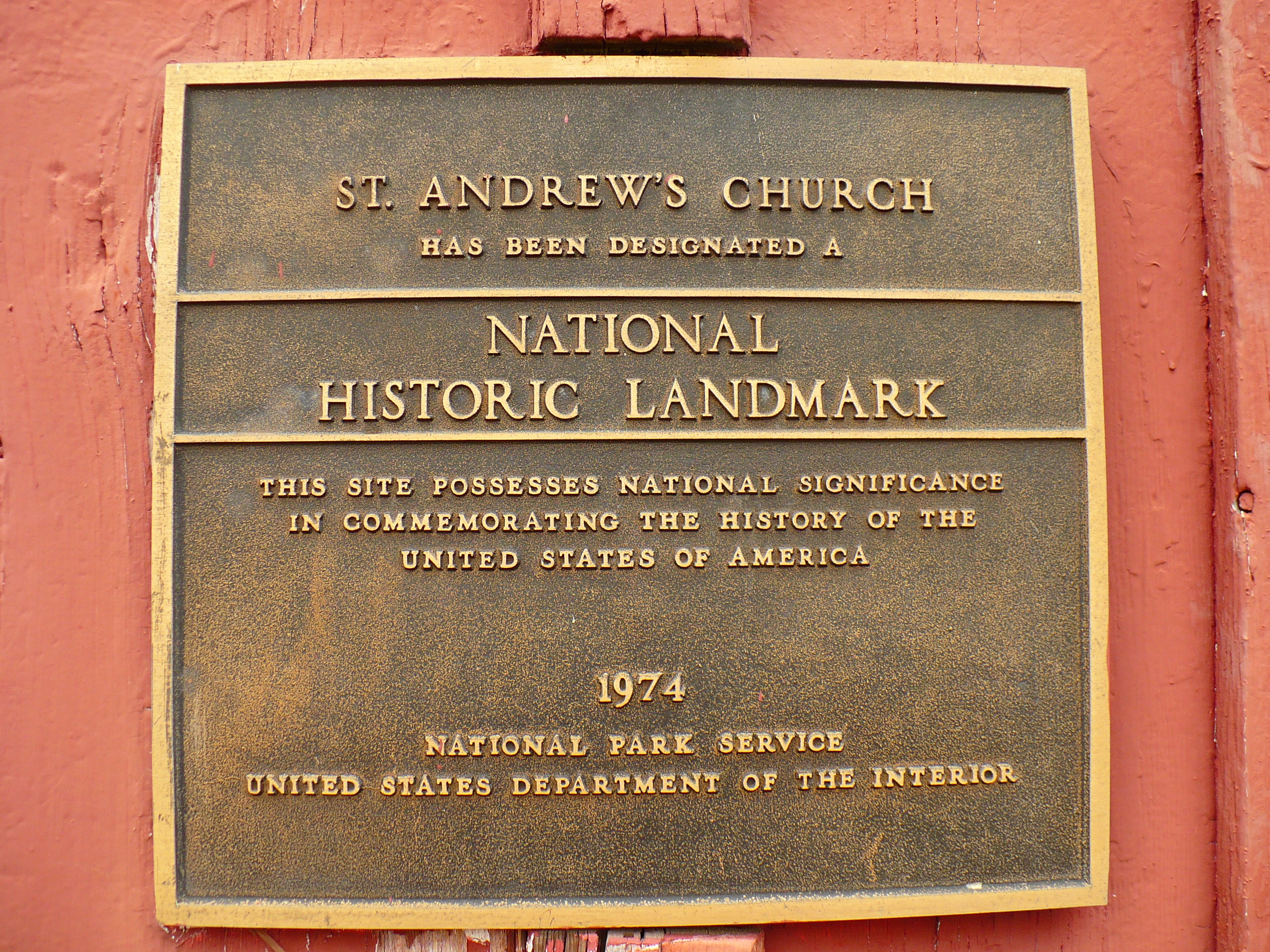
National Historic Landmark plaque

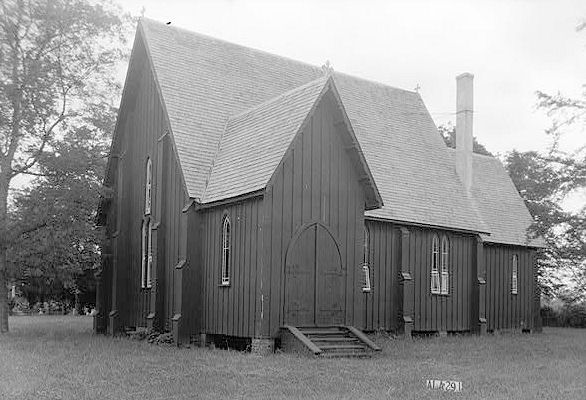
St. Andrew's in 1936

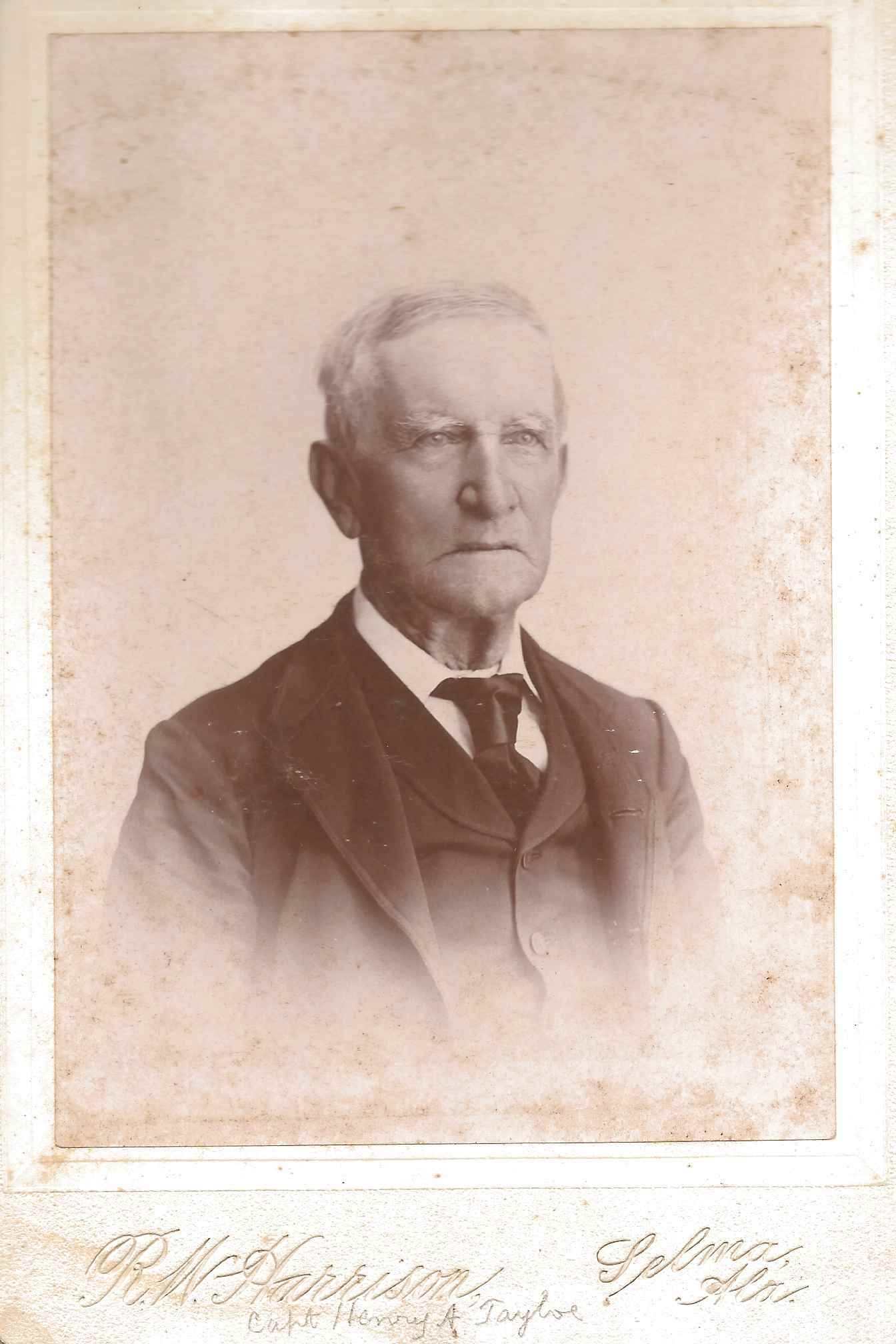
Henry Augustine Tayloe, photograph taken by RW Harrison, Selma, AL

== See also ==
- List of National Historic Landmarks in Alabama
- National Register of Historic Places listings in Hale County, Alabama
