= Dayton, Alabama =

- Town
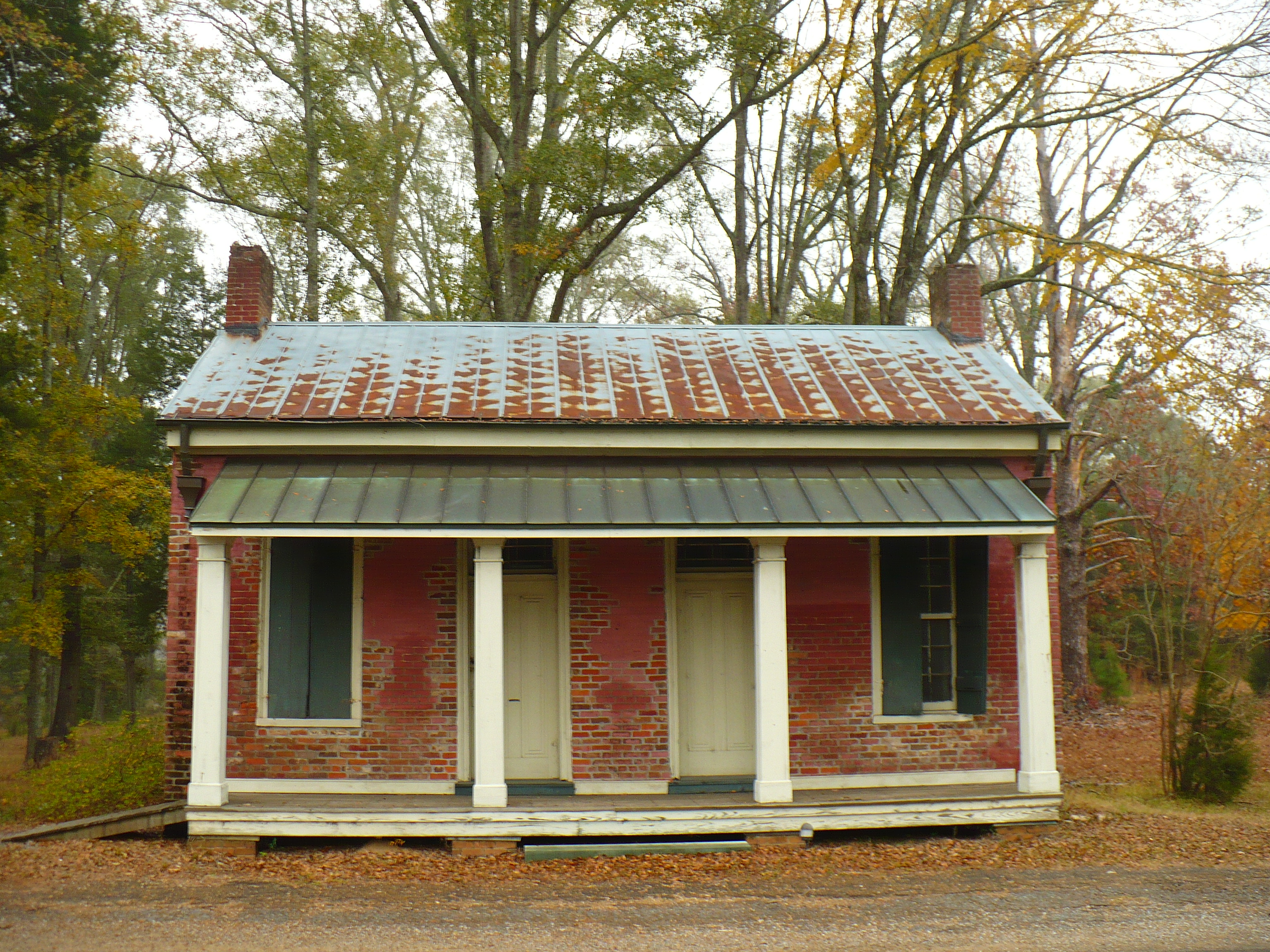
- The Boddie law office, now the Dayton Town Hall, completed in 1858

- Location in Marengo County, Alabama
- Coordinates: 32°21′03″N 87°38′30″W
- Country: United States
- State: Alabama
- County: Marengo
- Incorporated: January 13, 1844

Area
  - Total: 1.00 sq mi (2.59 km^{2})
  - Land: 1.00 sq mi (2.59 km^{2})
  - Water: 0 sq mi (0.00 km^{2})
- Elevation: 236 ft (72 m)

Population (2020)
  - Total: 28
  - Estimate (2022): 27
  - Density: 27.0/sq mi (10.44/km^{2})
- Time zone: UTC−6 (Central (CST))
  - Summer (DST): UTC−5 (CDT)
- ZIP Code: 36738
- Area code: 334
- FIPS code: 01-19912
- GNIS feature ID: 2406361

Dayton is a town in Marengo County, Alabama, United States. The population was 28 at the 2020 census.

== History ==
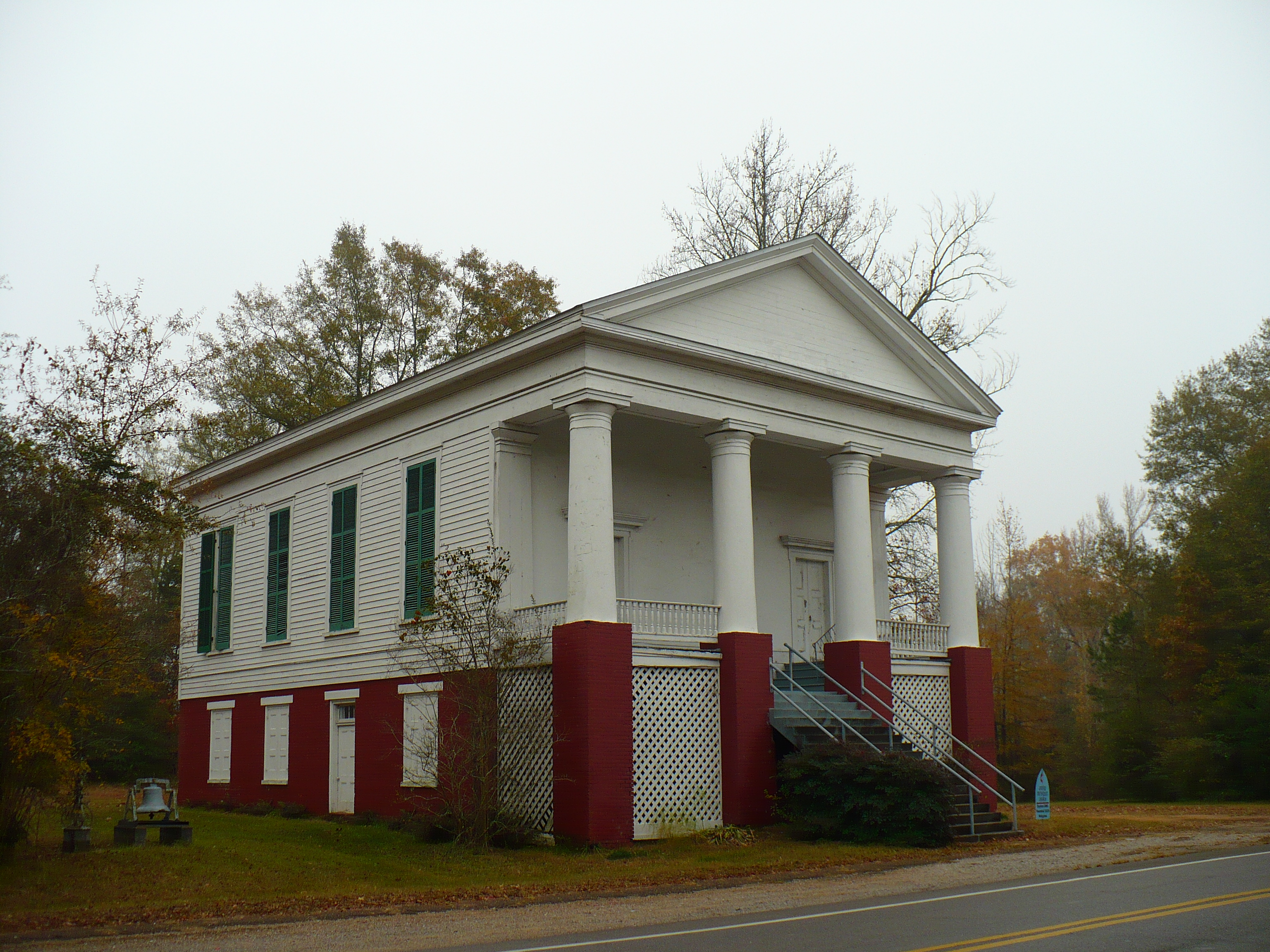
The Dayton United Methodist Church, completed in November 1850

Dayton began to be settled in the early 19th century, with a town survey done and a "public well" established in 1832. The post office was established in 1837. It was incorporated on January 13, 1844. A devastating tornado hit the town in 1852. By 1860 the town had male and female academies, a hotel, cotton gin, oil mill, blacksmith shop, tavern, cabinet shop, drug store, and several general merchandise stores. The town also had several large homes, though most are now gone. One of the survivors, the William Poole House, is listed on the National Register of Historic Places. The decrease in agricultural activity over the last century has reduced the population to a fraction of what it once was.

== Geography ==
Dayton is located in northeastern Marengo County 11 miles (18 km) northeast of Linden, the county seat, and 20 miles (32 km) southeast of Demopolis, the largest city in the county.

According to the United States Census Bureau, Dayton has a total area of 1.0 square mile (2.6 km^{2}), all land. The town sits on a ridge that drains southeast to Dry Creek and northwest to Little Dry Creek, both tributaries of Chickasaw Bogue, which flows west across the county to the Tombigbee River.

=== Climate ===
The climate in this area is characterized by hot, humid summers and generally mild to cool winters. According to the Köppen Climate Classification system, Dayton has a humid subtropical climate, abbreviated "Cfa" on climate maps.

== Demographics ==
Historical population
Census	Pop.	Note	%±
1870	426		—
1880	473		11.0%
1890	412		−12.9%
1900	427		3.6%
1910	382		−10.5%
1920	245		−35.9%
1930	202		−17.6%
1940	153		−24.3%
1950	85		−44.4%
1960	99		16.5%
1970	115		16.2%
1980	113		−1.7%
1990	77		−31.9%
2000	60		−22.1%
2010	52		−13.3%
2020	28		−46.2%
2022 (est.)	27	▼	−3.6%
U.S. Decennial Census; 2020 Census

=== Racial and ethnic composition ===
Dayton town, Alabama – Racial and ethnic composition Note: the US Census treats Hispanic/Latino as an ethnic category. This table excludes Latinos from the racial categories and assigns them to a separate category. Hispanics/Latinos may be of any race.
Race / Ethnicity (NH = Non-Hispanic)	Pop 2000	Pop 2010	Pop 2020	% 2000	% 2010	% 2020
White alone (NH)	21	17	10	35.00%	32.69%	35.71%
Black or African American alone (NH)	39	34	18	65.00%	65.38%	64.29%
Native American or Alaska Native alone (NH)	0	0	0	0.00%	0.00%	0.00%
Asian alone (NH)	0	0	0	0.00%	0.00%	0.00%
Native Hawaiian or Pacific Islander alone (NH)	0	0	0	0.00%	0.00%	0.00%
Other race alone (NH)	0	0	0	0.00%	0.00%	0.00%
Mixed race or Multiracial (NH)	0	1	0	0.00%	1.92%	0.00%
Hispanic or Latino (any race)	0	0	0	0.00%	0.00%	0.00%
Total	60	52	28	100.00%	100.00%	100.00%

=== 2020 census ===
As of the 2020 census, there were 28 people, 7 households, and 4 families residing in the city. There were 12 housing units.

=== 2000 Census ===
As of the 2000 census, there were 60 people, 20 households, and 15 families residing in the town. There were 28 housing units. The racial makeup of the town was 65% Black or African American and 35% White.

There were 20 households, out of which 20% had children under the age of 18 living with them, 50% were married couples living together, 20% had a female householder with no husband present, and 25% were non-families. 25% of all households were made up of individuals, and 15% had someone living alone who was 65 years of age or older. The average household size was 3.00 and the average family size was 3.27.

In the town, the population was spread out, with 36.7% under the age of 18, 5.0% from 18 to 24, 13.3% from 25 to 44, 26.7% from 45 to 64, and 18.3% who were 65 years of age or older. The median age was 34 years. For every 100 females, there were 76.5 males. For every 100 females age 18 and over, there were 58.3 males.

The median income for a household in the town was $12,500, and the median income for a family was $6,250. Males had a median income of $32,917 versus $30,417 for females. The per capita income for the town was $10,235. There were 66.7% of families and 58.7% of the population living below the poverty line, including 50.0% of under eighteens and 50.0% of those over 64.

== Notable people ==
- Sarah Byrd Askew, public librarian who pioneered the establishment of county libraries in the United States
- Richard H. Clarke, U.S. Representative for the 1st District of Alabama
- Bill Poole, politician
