= Altwood =

Historic house in Alabama, United States

- U.S. National Register of Historic Places
- Alabama Register of Landmarks and Heritage
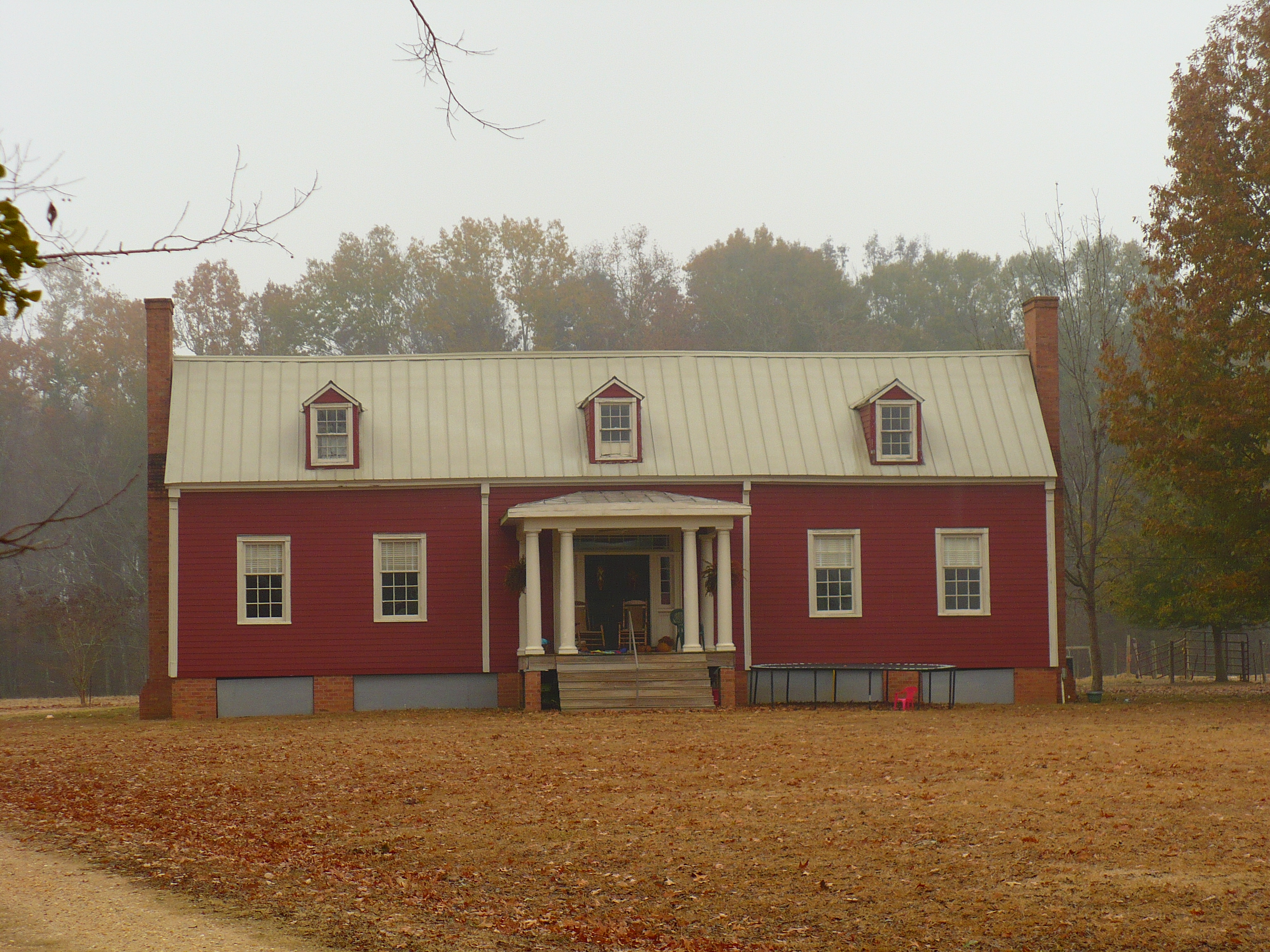
- Altwood in 2008

- Location within Alabama Location within the United States
- Nearest city: Faunsdale, Alabama
- Coordinates: 32°25′26″N 87°40′28″W
- Built: 1836
- MPS: Plantation Houses of the Alabama Canebrake and Their Associated Outbuildings
- NRHP reference No.: 93000598

Significant dates
- Added to NRHP: July 13, 1993
- Designated ARLH: February 19, 1988

Altwood is a historic plantation house located near Faunsdale, Alabama. It was built in 1836 by Richard H. Adams, whose wife was Anna Carter Harrison was the daughter of Carter Bassett Harrison, great-granddaughter of Benjamin Harrison V, great-great-granddaughter of Benjamin Harrison VI, and great-great-great-granddaughter of King Carter. It began as a log dogtrot house and was then expanded until it came to superficially resemble a Tidewater-type cottage. Brought to the early Alabama frontier by settlers from the Tidewater and Piedmont regions of Virginia, this vernacular house-type is usually a story-and-a-half in height, displays strict symmetry, and is characterized by prominent end chimneys flanking a steeply pitched longitudinal gable roof that is often pierced by dormer windows much like Gunston Hall.

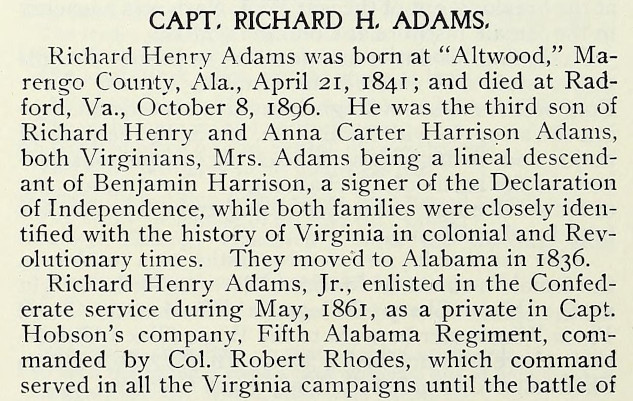
Capt Richard H Adams Obituary Part I

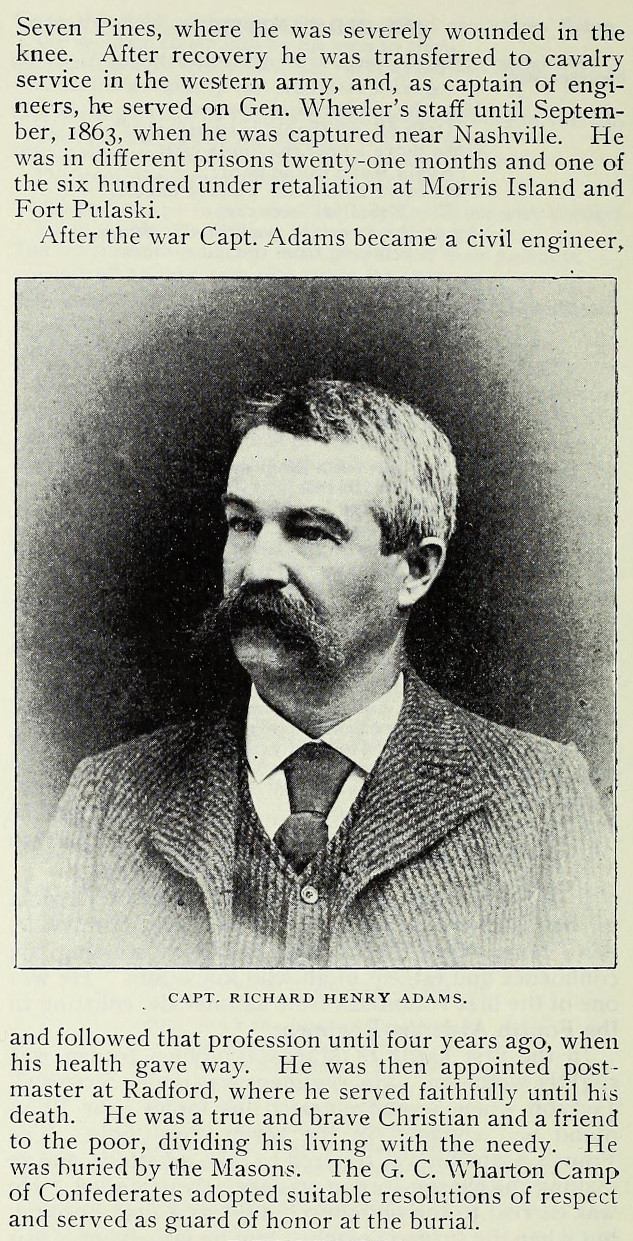
Capt Richard H Adams Obituary Part II

It was added to the Alabama Register of Landmarks and Heritage on February 19, 1988, and to the National Register of Historic Places on July 13, 1993, as a part of the Plantation Houses of the Alabama Canebrake and Their Associated Outbuildings Multiple Property Submission.
