= Borden Oaks =

Historic house in Alabama, United States

- U.S. National Register of Historic Places
- U.S. Historic district
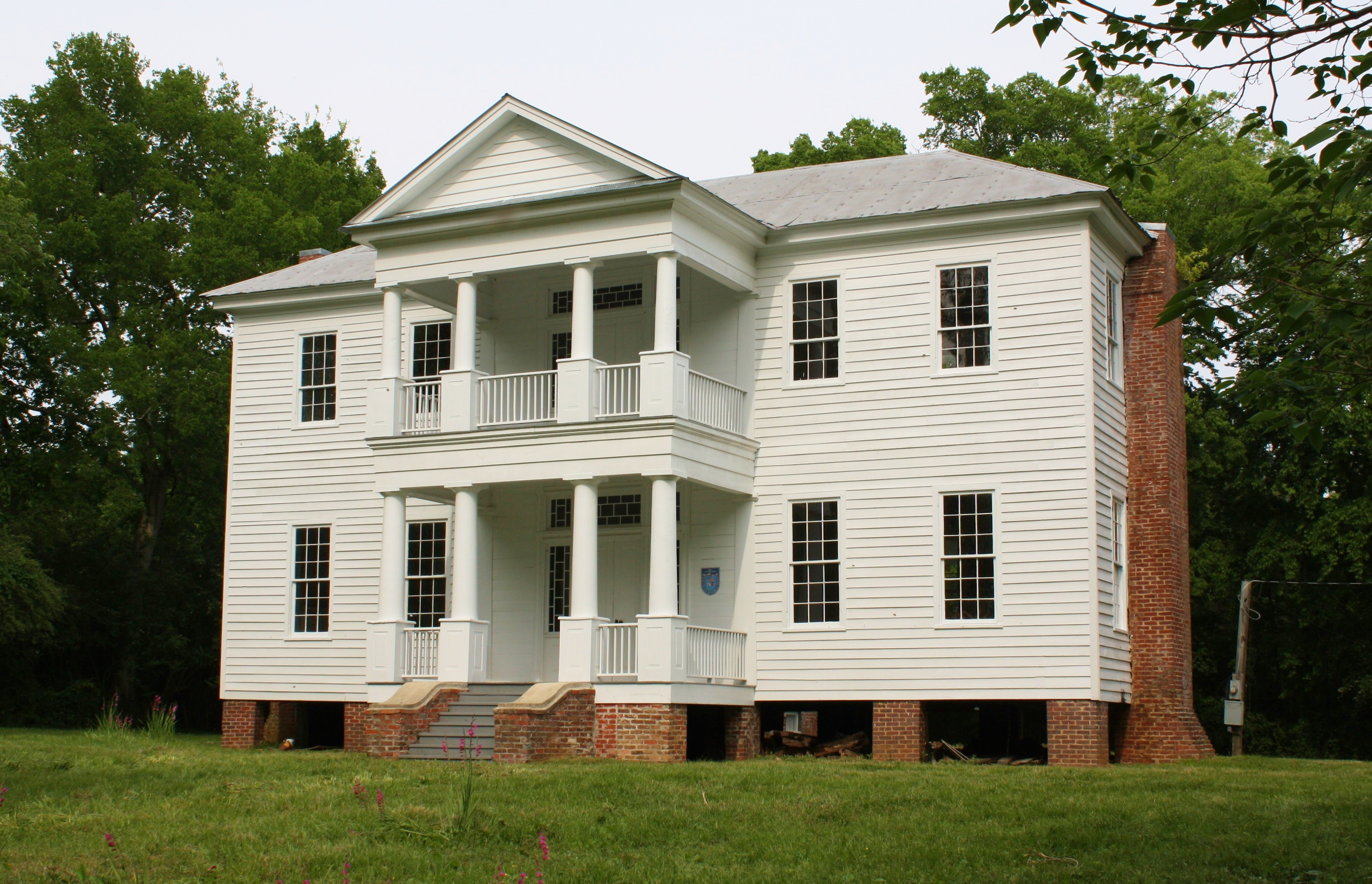
- Front facade in 2011

- Location within Alabama Location within the United States
- Nearest city: Greensboro, Alabama
- Coordinates: 32°43′4″N 87°41′21″W
- Built: 1835–37
- Architectural style: Federal; I-house
- MPS: Plantation Houses of the Alabama Canebrake and Their Associated Outbuildings Multiple Property Submission
- NRHP reference No.: 94000685
- Added to NRHP: July 7, 1994

Borden Oaks is a plantation house and historic district near Greensboro, Alabama, United States. It was added to the National Register of Historic Places on July 7, 1994 as a part of the Plantation Houses of the Alabama Canebrake and Their Associated Outbuildings Multiple Property Submission.

== History ==
Initially named Locust Lawn, the main house at Borden Oaks was built in 1835 by John Scott Gray and his wife, Martha Thompson Cocke Gray, on property given to them by Martha's father. John Scott Gray died on October 19, 1835, leaving Martha a widow. She remained single for ten years and remarried on November 3, 1845, to Richard Benjamin Borden, a widower originally from Carteret County, North Carolina. Locust Lawn came to be known as Borden Oaks after their marriage.

John Scott and Martha's child, John Ruffin Gray, died in 1862 in the Battle of Fredericksburg.

== Architecture ==
The house is a two-story frame Federal-style structure with a hipped roof. The front elevation is a five bay facade with a central two-tiered porch over the central bay and doorways. The upper and lower central doorways on the front facade have sidelights and transoms derived from a design published in Asher Benjamin's The Practice of Architecture (1833). A two-story ell, with matching overall proportions, is attached to the rear of the house. The original porch was removed from the house after 1924, and the columns were reused on a house in nearby Greensboro, although several feet of the lower portion of each column were cut off to fit the new house. These were returned to a descendant and then owner of the property, Mary Esther Borden Coleman, when that later house was demolished in the late 20th century. They were returned to Borden Oaks and the porch was rebuilt when the house was stabilized and the exterior restored by Bestor Wynne Coleman, Mrs. Coleman's son. However, new paneled bases for the columns had to be fabricated to rebuild the portico in keeping with its original proportions.
