= Hawthorne (Prairieville, Alabama) =

Historic house in Alabama, United States

- U.S. National Register of Historic Places
- U.S. Historic district
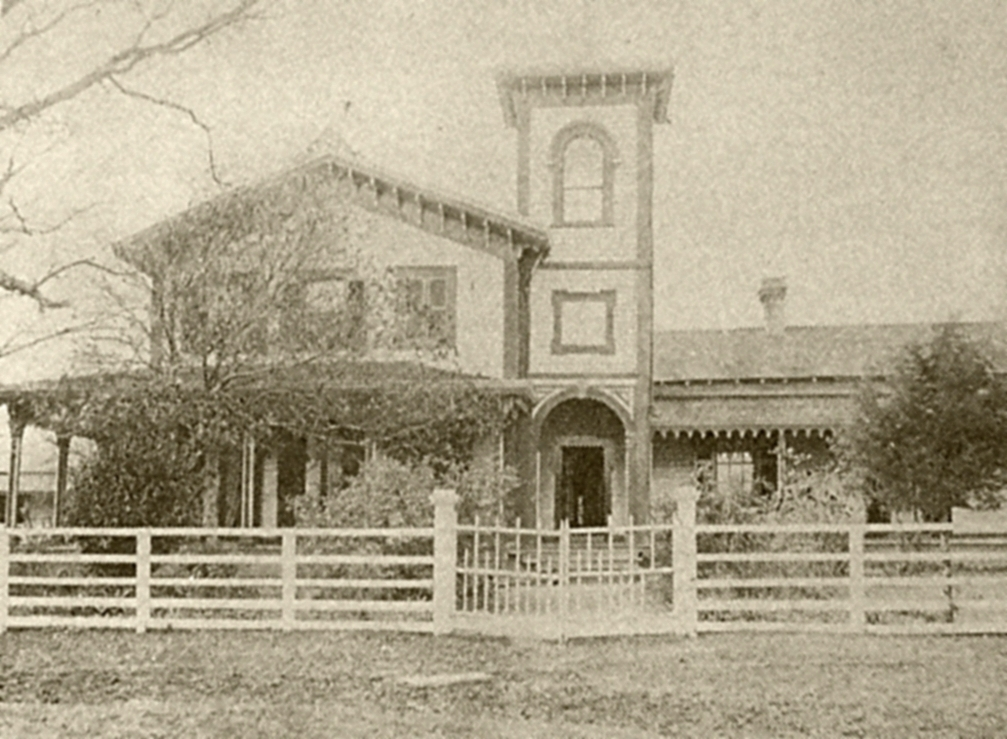
- Hawthorne as it appeared in 1898

- Location within Alabama Location within the United States
- Nearest city: Prairieville, Alabama
- Coordinates: 32°30′50″N 87°41′59″W
- Built: 1818, renovated 1862
- Architect: Tayloe, J. W.
- Architectural style: Italian Villa
- MPS: Plantation Houses of the Alabama Canebrake and Their Associated Outbuildings Multiple Property Submission
- NRHP reference No.: 94000694
- Added to NRHP: July 7, 1994

Hawthorne, also known as the Browder Place, is a historic Italianate plantation house and historic district in Prairieville, Alabama, US. This area of Hale County was included in Marengo County before the creation of Hale in 1867. Hawthorne is included in the Plantation Houses of the Alabama Canebrake and Their Associated Outbuildings Multiple Property Submission. It was added to the National Register of Historic Places on July 7, 1994, due to its architectural significance.

== History ==
Construction on Hawthorne began in 1818. It was eventually enlarged to a large house with over 30 rooms and a full basement by the Manning family, who used the forced labor of enslaved people to work the plantation. The property was later purchased by Dr. James Daniel Browder; by the end of the Civil War he had downsized most of the existing structure and completed the house as it stands today. The architect for Dr Browder's project was a young architect, Maj. J. W. Tayloe, of the Canebrake, perhaps the most notable young cotton planter in the area between 1850 and 1860. The eldest son of George Plater Tayloe of Buena Vista (Roanoke, Virginia) who owned considerable estates in the Arcola, Alabama neighborhood including "Elmwood" and brother to Col George E Tayloe, he was the grandson of Col. John Tayloe III of the Octagon House in Washington DC and great grandson of Col. John Tayloe II who built the grand colonial estate Mount Airy in Richmond Co Virginia. He graduated from Virginia Military Institute, inherited Walnut Grove Plantation and married Miss Lucie Randolph of "Oakleigh" plantation. He and the client designed the house with inspiration drawn from Samuel Sloan's 1852 publication of The Model Architect.

== Architecture ==
Hawthorne is built in the Italian Villa style. It comprises a main two-story block, a three-story tower, and an adjoining one-story wing. A one-story porch with corbel brackets wraps around the main block of the house. The gables and eaves on the main section and tower are also bracketed. Numerous French doors open onto the porch from the parlor and dining room. The tower contains an arched entrance vestibule at the base. It originally had arched windows on the third level, as well as decorative woodwork on the second level and around the ground floor archway. The tower windows have been replaced by simple square sash windows and the decorative details have been simplified with the addition of synthetic siding.
