= Prairieville, Alabama =

Unincorporated community in Alabama, United States

- Unincorporated community
- Location within Alabama Location within the United States
- Coordinates: 32°30′36″N 87°41′40″W
- Country: United States
- State: Alabama
- County: Hale
- Elevation: 190 ft (58 m)
- Time zone: UTC-6 (Central (CST))
  - Summer (DST): UTC-5 (CDT)
- Area code: 334
- GNIS feature ID: 156931

Prairieville is an unincorporated community in Hale County, Alabama, United States.

== Geography ==
Prairieville is located at 32.51013°N 87.69445°W. It has an elevation of 190 feet (58 m).

== Landmarks ==
The town is the location of the 1853 Carpenter Gothic style St. Andrew's Episcopal Church, on the National Register of Historic Places and a National Historic Landmark.

Prairieville also has three Plantation houses on the National Register of Historic Places:

- Battersea
- Bermuda Hill
- Hawthorne

== See also ==
- National Register of Historic Places listings in Hale County, Alabama
