= Old Spring Hill, Alabama =

Unincorporated community in Alabama, United States

- Unincorporated community
- Location within the state of Alabama Old Spring Hill (the United States)
- Coordinates: 32°26′16.8″N 87°46′26.4″W
- Country: United States
- State: Alabama
- County: Marengo
- Elevation: 315 ft (96 m)
- Time zone: UTC-6 (Central (CST))
  - Summer (DST): UTC-5 (CDT)
- Area code: 334

Old Spring Hill is an unincorporated community in Marengo County, Alabama, United States.

== History ==
This village was settled in the early 19th century, with a Methodist church established in 1825 and a Baptist church in 1828. Prior to the American Civil War it had a male academy, female academy, Masonic lodge, and several stores.

The community was originally named Spring Hill, but a community by the same name near Mobile was granted a post office under that name after the Civil War, when Spring Hill had lost its post office. In order to have a new post office established, the name was changed to Old Spring Hill.

== Geography ==
Old Spring Hill is located at 32.438°N 87.774°W and has an elevation of 315 feet (96 m).
