= Hatch House =

Hatch House may refer to the following houses in the United States:

(sorted by state, then city/town)

- Hatch House (Greensboro, Alabama), NRHP-listed
- L.H. Hatch House, Franklin, Idaho, listed on the NRHP in Franklin County, Idaho
- William H. Hatch House, River Forest, Illinois, listed on the NRHP in Cook County, Illinois
- Hatch House (Wells, Maine), NRHP-listed
- Ruth and Robert Hatch Jr. House, Wellfleet, Massachusetts, NRHP-listed
- Horace Hatch House, Winchester, Massachusetts, NRHP-listed
- Vermont Hatch Mansion, Cornwall, New York, NRHP-listed
- Barbara Rutherford Hatch House, New York, New York, listed on the NRHP in upper Manhattan
- Charles and Elizabeth Hatch House, Rogue River, Oregon, listed on the NRHP in Jackson County, Oregon
- Abram Hatch House, Heber City, Utah, NRHP-listed
- Ira Hatch House, Panguitch, Utah, contributing in NRHP-listed Panguitch Historic District, designed by Richard Kletting
- Seneca W. & Bertha Hatch House, Shorewood, Wisconsin, listed on the NRHP in Milwaukee County, Wisconsin
- Horace W. Hatch House, Whitefish Bay, Wisconsin, listed on the NRHP in Milwaukee County, Wisconsin

== See also ==
- Alfred Hatch Place at Arcola, Gallion, Alabama, listed on the National Register of Historic Places (NRHP) in Hale County, Alabama
- Hatch's Camp, Cache National Forest, Utah, NRHP-listed
