= Chassériau (surname) =

Chassériau is a surname. Notable people with this surname include:

- Arthur Chassériau (1850–1934), French art collector and stockbroker
- Benoît Chassériau (1780–1844), French diplomat
- Charles Frédéric Chassériau (1802–1896), French painter
- Leopold Chasseriau (1825–1891), French planter
- Théodore Chassériau (1819–1856), French romantic painter
- Victor Frédéric Chassériau (1774–1815), French general
