= Benoît Chassériau =

French diplomat

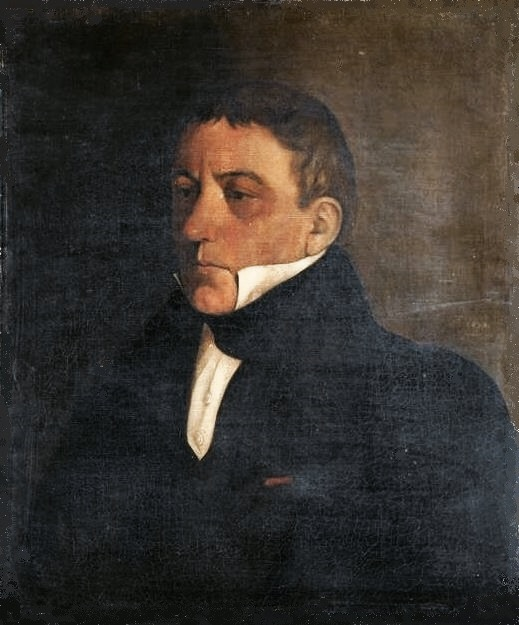
Portrait of Benoit Chassériau in 1832 by Théodore Chassériau – Louvre Museum, Paris

Benoît Chassériau (also known as Benito Chassériau or Chasserieux; 19 August 1780 – 27 September 1844) was a French diplomat and spy. He was the Minister of the Interior of Cartagena, Colombia and comrade in arms of Simón Bolívar. He was the father of the artist Théodore Chassériau.

== Biography ==
Chassériau came very early in the administration and made the memorable Egypt campaign. Although very young, he administered as Financial Controller, two important provinces of Upper Egypt from 1798 to 1801 under the command of general François-Étienne Damas and then under general Augustin-Daniel Belliard.

From 1802 until 1807, he was Treasurer-General and Secretary General of the French colony, Santo Domingo. Appointed Treasurer-General during the expedition to Santo Domingo in 1802, Chassériau held the position of Secretary General in the government of general Jean-Louis Ferrand in the eastern part of Santo Domingo, ceded to France by the Treaty of Basel. During the invasion of the peninsula by the imperial armies, this part of the territory of Santo Domingo, remained more Spanish than French. Taken prisoner, Chassériau managed to escape but maritime war prevented him from returning to France. He visited the West Indies and the mainland of Spanish America. Chassériau was one of the French exiles at the origin of the city of Aigleville and the Vine and Olive Colony.

In 1813 Simón Bolívar appointed Chassériau Minister of the Interior and the Police in Cartagena, Colombia with his friend Antoine Leleux, who had the portfolio of War.

Chassériau as commander took a very active part in the first expedition led by independent against Portobelo (Panama) and Santa Marta. He left Cartagena with 460 men on board 8 schooners and attacked Portobelo (Panama) on 16 January 1814. This expedition was a failure and was rejected by the Spanish royalists controlled by governor Joaquín Rodríguez Valcárcel.

The second expedition conducted in 1819 by Scottish general Gregor MacGregor was a success to take Portobelo but without further attacks Panama remained as possession of Spain. One year later Chassériau along with the privateer Louis-Michel Aury, the merchant Jean-Baptiste Pavageau and the privateer shipowner Jean-Baptiste de Novion, had imagined conquering Panama. This project aimed to give France the means to strengthen and secure its trade in this region of the world. Unofficially, the Minister of the Navy and the Colonies, Pierre-Barthélémy Portal d'Albarèdes, declined their bold offer.

In 1822, Chassériau was the representative of the Masonic lodge of La Guajira to the Grand Orient of France. Belonging to a lodge was more a sign of adherence to philosophical or religious principles in a revolutionary goal for freedom and against Spain.

Returned to France in 1822, François-René de Chateaubriand, then Minister of Foreign Affairs, sent him on a foreign posting from 1823 until 1824. Chateaubriand gave two informal postings to Chassériau: the first mission was to ensure the mediation of France between Spain and the new state and the second mission to facilitate trade relations between Colombia and the French Caribbean colonies, mainly Martinique. This mission did not go unnoticed, as the President of the United States, James Monroe, referred to it in detail in his correspondence with former President Thomas Jefferson in July 1824. From 1826 to 1830, Chassériau was employed by the Department of the Navy as agent in the Danish island of Saint Thomas, U.S. Virgin Islands. From 1832 to 1833 he was employed by the Department of Foreign Affairs, as a Consul of France in St. Thomas. He was Honorary Consul accredited in Puerto Rico from 1835 to 1839, and served from 1840 to 1844 as Consul of France in Puerto Rico, which had a population of 450,000 – of which 12,000 were French.

Chassériau died in Puerto Rico on 27 September 1844.

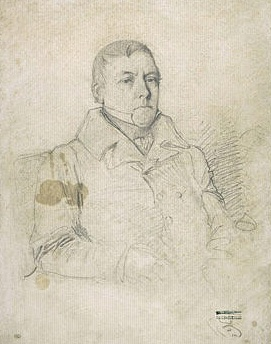
Portrait of Benoit Chassériau by Théodore Chassériau – Louvre Museum, Paris

== The French friend of Simón Bolívar ==
Chassériau maintained for many years a friendly relationship with Simón Bolívar who in his correspondence called him "my French friend".

In 1815, Chassériau indirectly saved the life of Bolívar in Kingston. On 10 December 1815 a few hours before the assassination attempt, Chassériau visited Bolivar and gave him money to seek alternative accommodation. Thus, the Liberator left the room where José Antonio Páez had slept for several nights and depended on the guesthouse Rafael Pisce at the corner of Prince and White streets. The same night, Pio the servant of Bolivar and Paez plunged a knife into the neck of Captain Felix Amestoy, thinking it was the Liberator.

In 1816, Chassériau helped finance Simón Bolívar expedition to los Cayos in the southwestern part of Haiti. To collect 3,000 pesos, Chassériau formed a consortium with Jean Pavageau, Michael Scott, George Robertson, S. Campbell and Maxwell Hyslop. On his part, Chassériau lent the sum of 404 pesos to Simón Bolívar. To express his gratitude, Bolivar asked in 1827 the repayment of the loan by increasing interest at 6% per annum from 1 January 1816.

== Family ==
Chassériau was the last of 18 children of Jean Chassériau, merchant, ship owner, advisor to the City of La Rochelle. He married in 1806, Marie-Madeleine Couret de la Blaquière, daughter of a wealthy mulatto landowner in Saint-Domingue (now Haiti). He was the father of five children, including:

- Frédéric-Victor-Charles Chassériau (1807–1881), State Councillor and historian of the Navy
- the Romantic painter Théodore Chassériau (1819–1856)
- Adèle, Aline Chassériau and Ernest Chassériau.

Chassériau was the brother of General Victor Frédéric Chassériau, uncle of Algiers Chief architect Charles Frédéric Chassériau, granduncle of Baron Arthur Chassériau (known as "the banker of the Gotha"), and distant cousin of British Malaya planter Léopold Chassériau.

== Distinctions ==
- Knight of the Legion of Honor
- Knight of the Royal Order of Dannebrog
- Knight of Isabella the Catholic
- Member of the Société royale des antiquaires du Nord, in Copenhagen

== Bibliography ==
- Jean-Baptiste Nouvion, Patrick Puigmal (Postface), "The Colombians' French Companion, Benoît Chassériau (1780-1844)", Paris LAC Editions, 2025 (ISBN 978-2-9565297-8-1)
- Conference "Benoît Chassériau, náufrago de Saint-Domingue, revolucionario en la Tierra Firme y agente de la Francia de la Restauración" by Daniel Gutiérrez Ardila and Efrain Gonzalo Sanchez, 12 September 2019, Luis Ángel Arango Library, Bogotá (Colombia) – Conferences for the celebration of the bi-centenary of Colombia organized by the Bank of the Republic (Colombia)
- Jean-Baptiste Nouvion, "Une autre 'affaire de Panama' ou le projet de conquête de quatre Français en 1820" (Louis-Michel Aury, Benoît Chassériau, Jean Pavageau and Jean-Baptiste de Novion), Revue d'histoire diplomatique, Paris, Éditions A. Pedone, no 2, 2019
- Jean-Baptiste Nouvion, Patrick Puigmal (postface), "L'ami des Colombiens, Benoît Chassériau (1780–1844)", LAC Editions, Paris, 2018 (ISBN 978-2-9565297-0-5)
- Patrick Puigmal, "Diccionario de los militares napoleónicos durante la Independencia de los países bolivarianos : (Colombia, Venezuela, Bolivia, Ecuador) / compilación e investigación", Centre de Recherches Diego Barros Arana de la Bibliothèque Nationale de Santiago (DIBAM), Chile, 2015
- Daniel Gutiérrez Ardila, Benoît Chassériau en Colombie in "Les commissaires de la Restauration auprès des Etats hispano-américains (1818–1826)", Cahiers de l'Institut d'histoire de la Révolution française, Paris – 2014
- William Spence Robertson, "France and Latin-American independence" (Chassériau mission in Colombia commissioned by the viscount of Chateaubriand), The Johns Hopkins Press, Baltimore – 1939
- Jean-Louis Vaudoyer, "L'histoire de Benoit Chassériau, consul de France à Puerto Rico", Conférence du 17 juin 1935 à l'assemblée générale de la Société des amis du Louvre, Paris – 1935

== Sources ==
Archives of the French Ministry of Foreign Affairs – individual file n° 889 Benoît Chassériau
