= Alfred Hatch Place at Arcola =

Historic house in Alabama, United States

- U.S. National Register of Historic Places
- U.S. Historic district
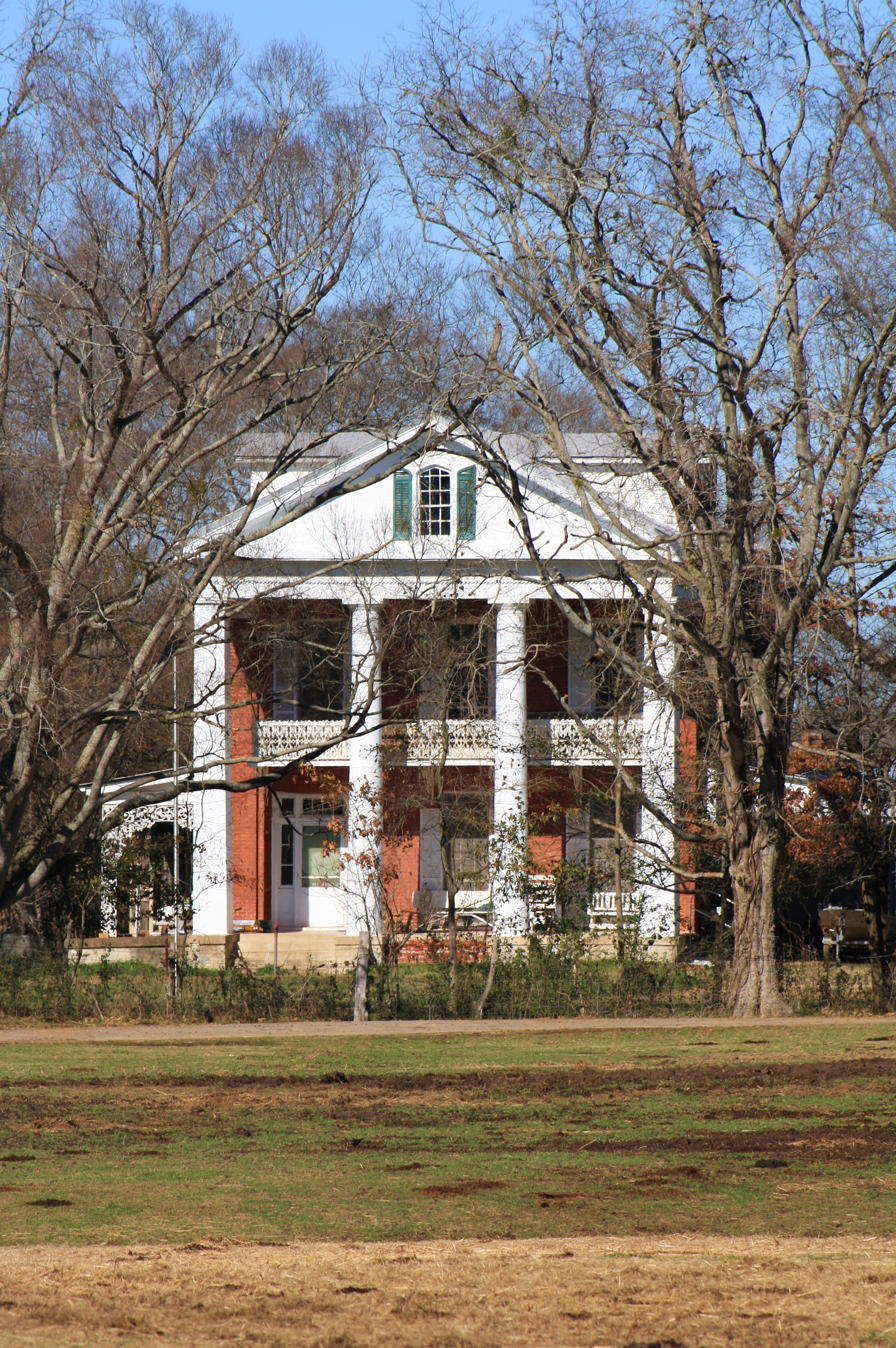
- The plantation house in 2011

- Location within Alabama Location within the United States
- Nearest city: Arcola, Alabama
- Coordinates: 32°33′59″N 87°46′12″W
- Built: 1856
- Architect: Alfred Hatch
- Architectural style: Greek Revival
- NRHP reference No.: 87001784
- Added to NRHP: January 6, 1988

The Alfred Hatch Place at Arcola, also known as the Arcola Plantation and locally as the Half-house, is a historic plantation house and historic district on the Black Warrior River several miles northwest of Gallion, Alabama, United States.

== History ==
It is located on land first settled by Frederic Ravesies, in what was once the Vine and Olive Colony town of Arcola, founded by French immigrants in the early 19th century. It was part of Marengo County until Hale County was created in 1867.

The main house was built in 1856 as the center of a 3,000-acre (12 km^{2}) forced-labor plantation owned by Alfred Parker Hatch. Hatch, born on October 14, 1799, in Craven County, North Carolina, married Elizabeth Vail Blount on May 8, 1822. The family, which eventually included three sons and three daughters, moved to Alabama in 1840. Alfred Hatch established several large plantations, including Elm Ridge near Greensboro, and enslaved a total of 200 people to work them. He purchased Arcola in the early 1850s from his brother Lemuel D. Hatch during a period of financial difficulty.

Elizabeth Hatch died before the end of the Civil War and Alfred remarried to Victoria Jones Walker. They had one daughter together in 1873. Alfred Hatch died on January 30, 1879, leaving most of the estate to his second wife, creating a rift between her and the children of his first wife.

== Architecture ==
The Hatch Place is a rare Alabama example of a temple-form house in the Greek Revival style. The house is a three-story brick structure, with massing suggestive of a pseudoperipteral building. The front facade features a monumental tetrastyle Doric portico across the front, with a full-width cantilevered balcony under the portico on the second level. A Tudor arch window is centered in the pediment over the portico. The plantation was added to the National Register of Historic Places on January 6, 1988, due to its architectural and historical significance.
