= Arcola, Alabama =

- Ghost town
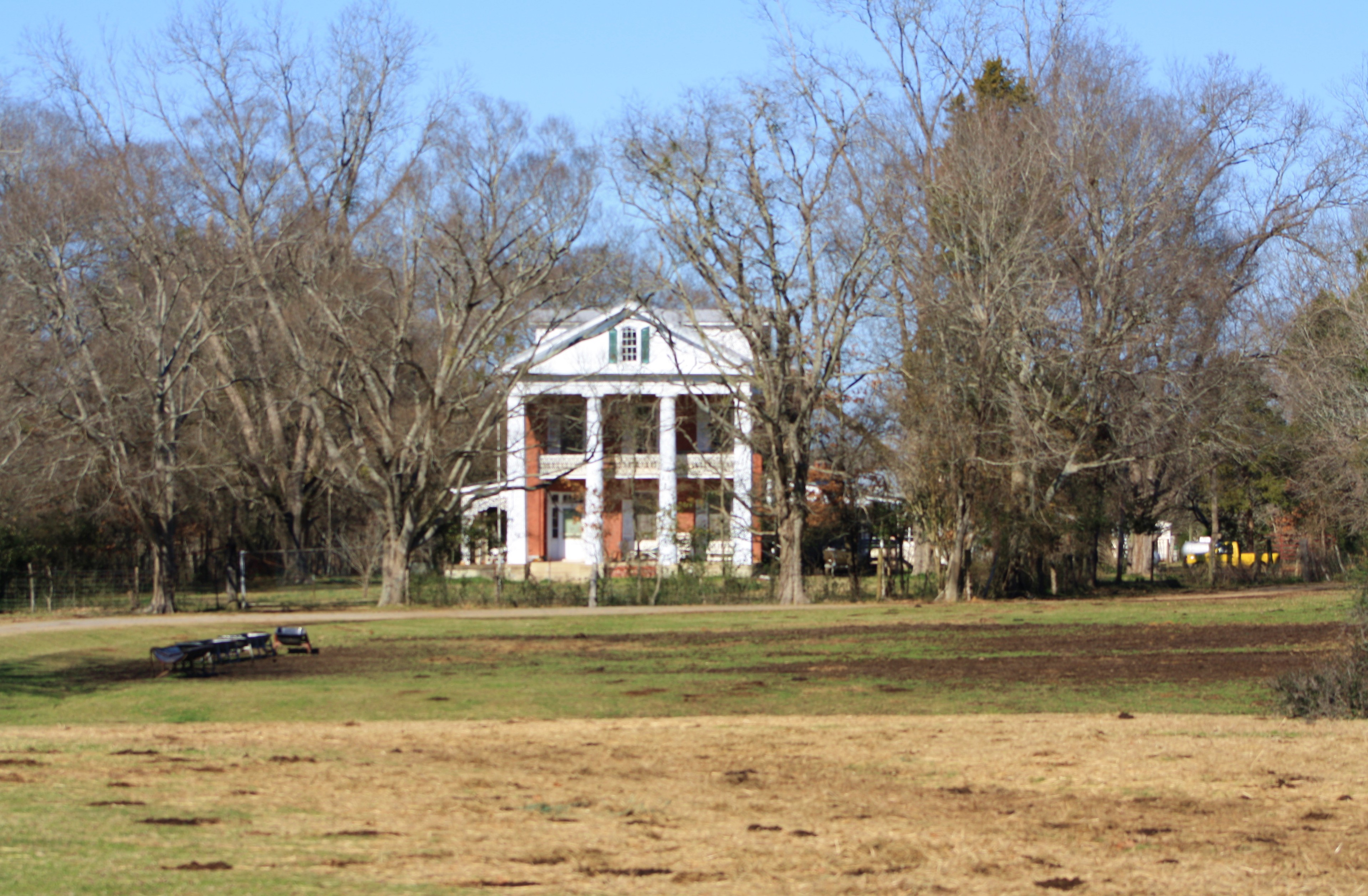
- Portion of the settlement site, the Hatch Plantation

- Location within Alabama Location within the United States
- Coordinates: 32.56617°N 87.78183°W
- Country: United States
- State: Alabama
- County: Marengo
- Elevation: 128 ft (39 m)
- Time zone: UTC-6 (Central (CST))
  - Summer (DST): UTC-5 (CDT)
- ZIP code: 36742
- Area code: 334

Arcola is a ghost town on the Black Warrior River in what is now Hale County, formerly Marengo County, Alabama. Named to honor the French victory during the Battle of Arcola, it was established in the early 1820s by former French Bonapartists as part of their Vine and Olive Colony, after they were forced to abandon their first town at Demopolis and many found Aigleville unsuitable. The first settler at the site was Frederic Ravesies, who established himself at what later became the Hatch Plantation. Although never more than a village, Arcola became the largest settlement in the colony. Beginning in the 1830s American settlers moved into the area and purchased most of the former French land grants, primarily using Arcola as a river landing. By the 1850s the French settlement had disappeared, replaced by a community of adjoining plantations.

== Demographics ==
According to the census returns from 1850-2010 for Alabama, it has never reported a population figure separately on the U.S. Census.
