= Aline Chassériau =

Painting by Théodore Chassériau

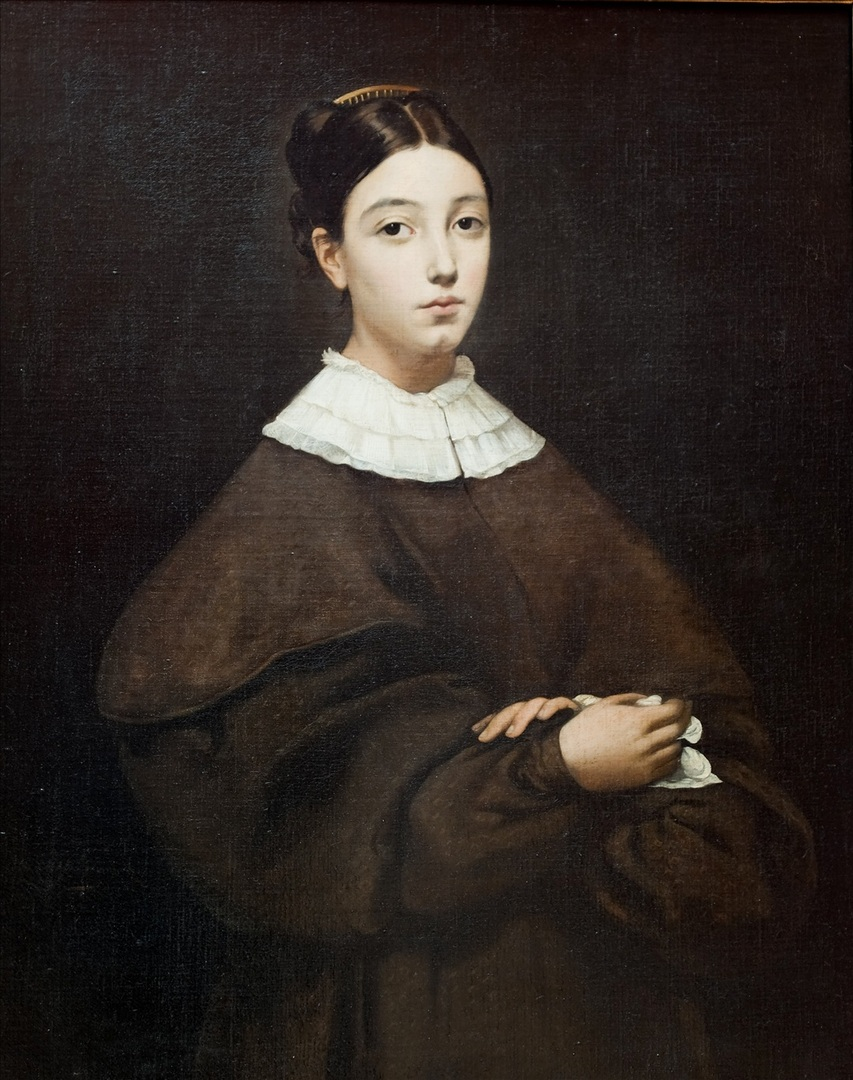
- Artist: Théodore Chassériau
- Year: 1835
- Medium: oil on canvas
- Dimensions: 92 cm × 73 cm (36 in × 29 in)
- Location: Musée du Louvre; Paris

Aline Chassériau is an 1835 oil-on-canvas painting by French romantic artist Théodore Chassériau, which represents Aline Chassériau (1822–1871), the painter's younger sister. Once owned by the artist's brother Frédéric, it was given to the Musée du Louvre by Baron Arthur Chassériau and his wife in 1918.

Aline (born Geneviève) Chassériau posed for this portrait when she was thirteen years of age, and the painter sixteen. In a nearly monochromatic design, Aline is depicted standing in front of a dark background. She wears a brown cloak with a white collar, and looks directly at the viewer with her hands crossed before her. The expression is somber, the handling of light assured. The refined technique of the portrait was influenced by Ingres, with whom Chassériau had recently studied, and Italian Renaissance masters Raphael and Bronzino.

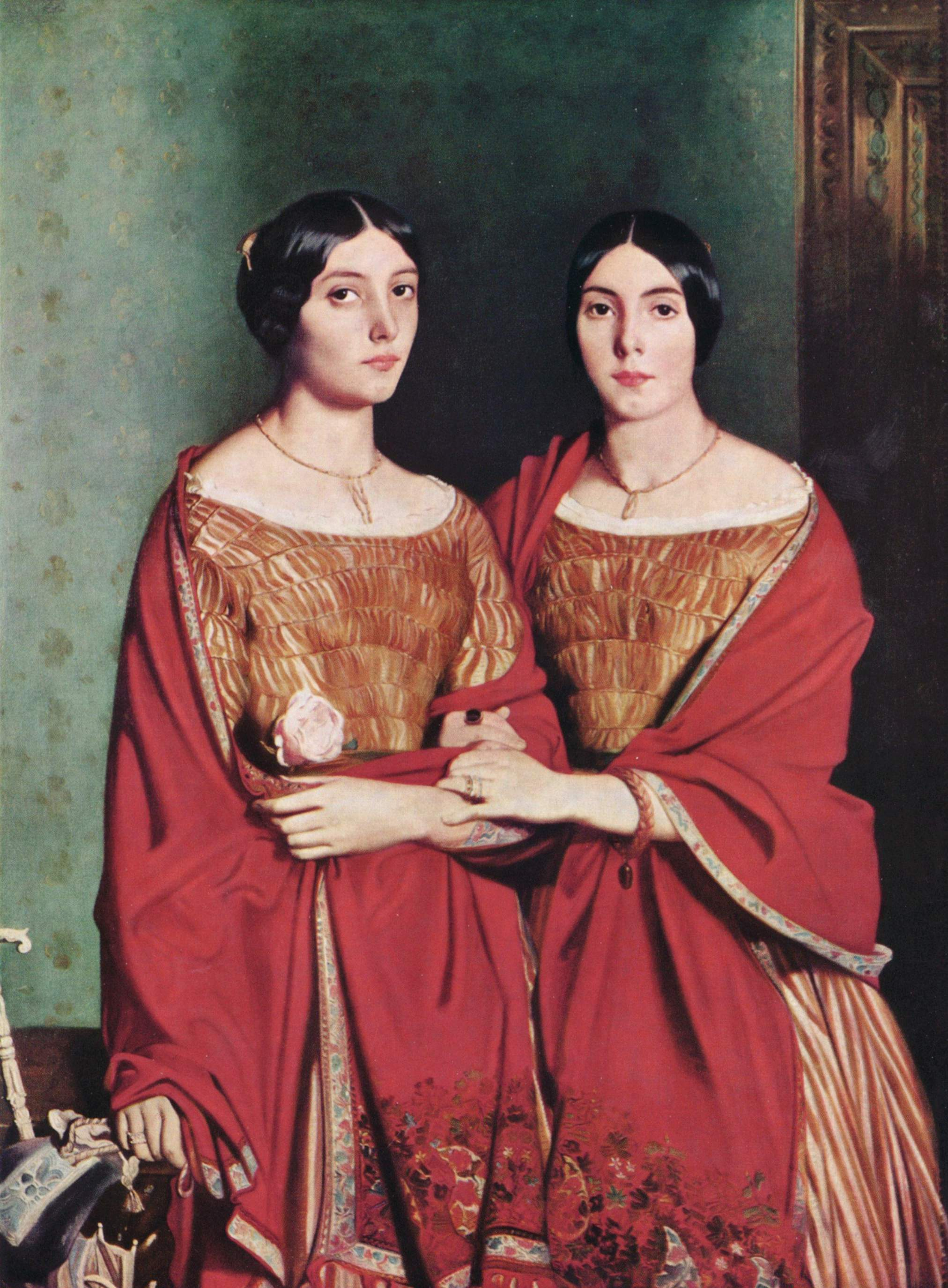
The Two Sisters, 1843. Oil on canvas, 180 x 135 cm. Chassériau's later portrait of Adèle and Aline together.

It had long been thought that the model for this painting was Chassériau's older sister Adèle, but pencil drawings of Aline, as well as renewed attention to the visual evidence—the subject is adolescent, and Adèle was twenty-five at the time—have corrected the misconception. Chassériau frequently used his siblings, especially his sisters, as models for drawing and painting. As a young man, his relationship to his sisters has been described as so close as to have been "almost amorous". Chassériau's first mistress, Clémence Monnerot, later recalled: "Adèle, Aline and I were Théodore's models for many years. He drew at night under lamplight and posed us as he liked. Adèle has superb arms; they appear everywhere....They are, too, young ladies, his two idealized sisters and their friend, whom he worshipped".

Her father Benoît Chassériau was a French diplomat, French spy and Minister of the Interior of Simón Bolívar in Cartagena, Colombia.

Aline did not marry, and died in 1871 during the Paris Commune in Bordeaux.
