= Champ d'Asile =

Texas settlement in 1818

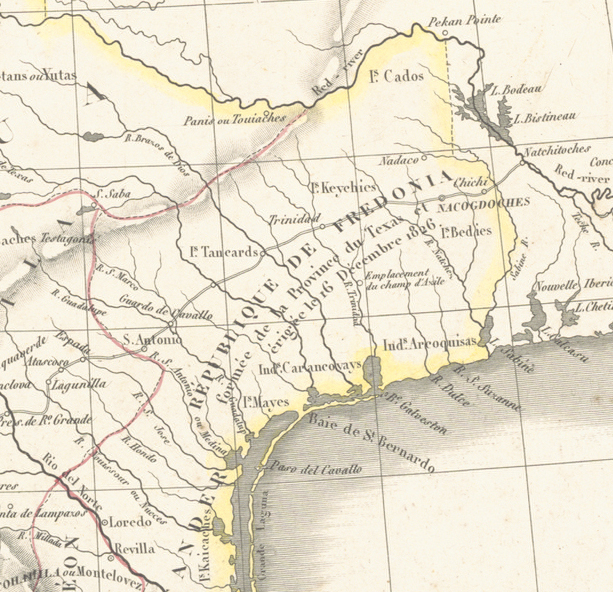
Champ d'Asile depicted on a map of the Republic of Fredonia, 1835

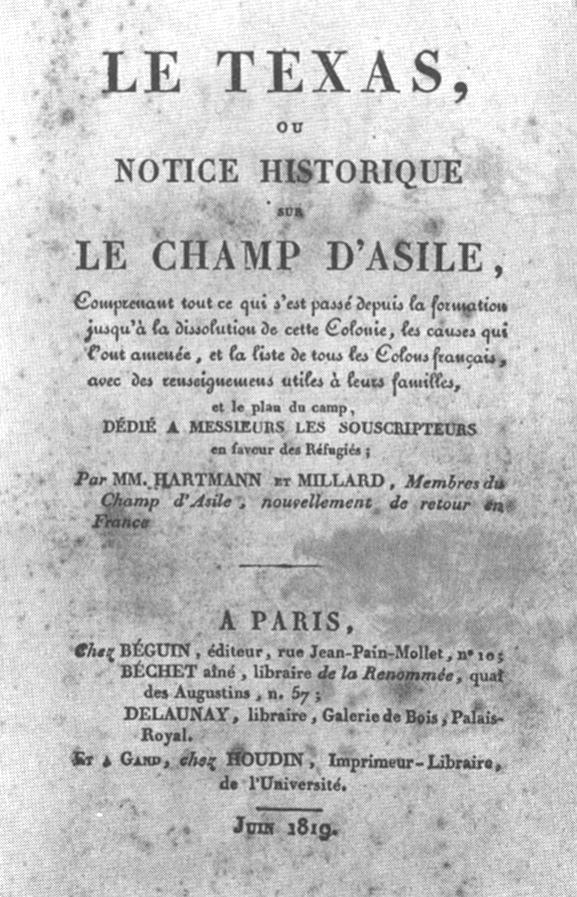
Cover of a history of the Champ d'Asile, written shortly after it was abandoned (see External links)

Champ d'Asile ("Field of Asylum") was a short-lived settlement founded in Texas in January 1818 by 20 French Bonapartist veterans of the Napoleonic Wars from the Vine and Olive Colony. The party was led by General Charles Lallemand. Land was offered to French settlers on March 3, 1817, after a vote by the United States Congress. Champ d'Asile was situated along the Trinity River and was abandoned in July of the same year.

Lallemand, a Bonapartist General, was accompanied by his brother, Baron Charles François Antoine Lallemand. The colony was to bring some military men for protection, and concentrate on agricultural work, cultivating grapes and olives. 100 officers joined Lallemand, and around a quarter to a third of these were foreigners of the Grande Armée; the rest were French. Lallemand financed the project through land speculation. On December 17, 1817 150 of the would-be-settlers sailed from Philadelphia for Galveston, Texas, where they arrived on January 14. Lallemand and the other colonists convened in New Orleans, and on March 10 left for Galveston with 120 volunteers. They sailed up the Trinity River to Atascosito where they built two small forts. Mexican governor Antonio María Martínez, having heard about this expedition, sent his own troops to San Marcos, wary of an attack. The colony was abandoned shortly afterwards.

Some of the colonists, including pirate Jean Laffite and other mercenaries, had caused concern to settlers of New Spain. The Champ d'Asile was founded at a time when disputes over territory were increasing, and the Adams–Onís Treaty, which settled a border dispute between the United States and Spain, was signed in 1819. Furthermore, the Bourbon Restoration in France made the existence of a Bonapartist colony doubtful, as the Spanish Bourbons held the Spanish crown. Despite Lallemand's assurances, rumours had circulated about his motives, and there was little evidence of agricultural work on the site, while construction of a fortress and manufacturing munitions had begun.
