= Aigleville, Alabama =

- Ghost town
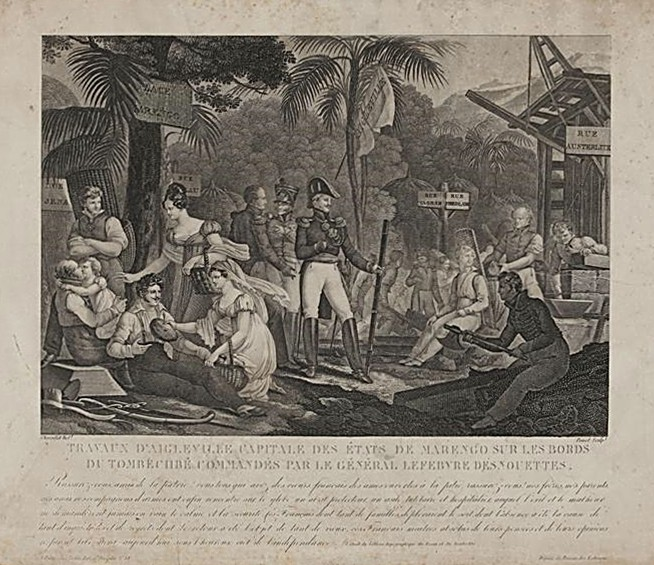
- Parisian engraving from 1819 of the building of the Aigleville settlement, directed by General Lefèbvre-Desnoëttes. Note the erroneous inclusion of palm trees, which are not found in central Alabama.

- Location within the state of Alabama
- Coordinates: 32.51664°N 87.82329°W
- Country: United States
- State: Alabama
- County: Marengo
- Elevation: 161 ft (49 m)
- Time zone: UTC-6 (Central (CST))
  - Summer (DST): UTC-5 (CDT)
- ZIP code: 36732
- Area code: 334

Aigleville, literally translated as Eagle Town, was a town on the Black Warrior River in Marengo County, Alabama, United States that is now a ghost town. The settlement was established in late 1818 by former French Bonapartists and refugees from Saint-Domingue, as a part of their Vine and Olive Colony. It was named in honor of the French Imperial Eagle, the standard used by the Grande Armée of Napoleon I, and is now within the city of Demopolis.

== History ==
The Vine and Olive colonists, numbering more than 300 people, discovered in early 1818 that their first town at Demopolis did not lie within the land grants given to them by Congress and moved one mile (1.6 km) east to this site. There they built pioneer-style log cabins on their town lots. These were described by a visiting Treasury Department official as having hewn log walls with plank or puncheon floors and measuring from 16 by 18 feet (4.9 m × 5.5 m) to 19 by 23 feet (5.8 m × 7.0 m).

Each settler at Aigleville owned three separate land lots. These included the town lot, a garden lot (called a small allotment), and a farm (called a large allotment). The town lots commonly ranged from 50 by 100 feet (15 m × 30 m) to 100 by 200 feet (30 m × 61 m), the small allotments ranged from less than 1 acre (0.0040 km^{2}; 0.40 ha) to 12 acres (0.049 km^{2}; 4.9 ha), and the large allotments ranged from 40 acres (0.16 km^{2}; 16 ha) to 480 acres (1.9 km^{2}; 190 ha).

The most prominent colonists also owned the largest allotments. These included Honore Bayol, Jean-Marie Chapron, Benoît Chassériau, Jean-Simone Chaudron, General Bertrand Clausel, Colonel Jean-Jerome Cluis, Charles DeBrosse, General Lefèbvre-Desnoëttes, Édouard George, Auguste Follin, Marc-Antoine Frenage, Joseph Lakanal, General Charles Lallemand and his brother Henri-Dominique Lallemand, Michael LeBouttellier, Bazile Meslier, Stephen Nidelet, Colonel Nicholas-Simon Parmentier, Guillaume Promis, Jean Penieres, Frederic Ravesies, Count Pierre-François Réal, General Antoine Rigaud, Francis Stollenwerck, Francois Teterel, and General Dominique Vandamme. A few of these men, such as the Lallemand brothers, never lived in the colony. They remained elsewhere and eventually sold their allotments.

With the failure of the colony at large, Aigleville was a largely abandoned by the late 1830s. Despite this, General Lefèbvre-Desnoëttes' house was noted as still standing during a governmental resurvey of the area in 1842. The site was heavily forested by the early 20th century. This gave way to open land with industrial usage during the later half of the 20th and into the 21st century, under its ownership by a local cement plant.

== Demographics ==
According to the returns from 1820–2010 for Alabama, it has never reported a population figure separately on the U.S. Census. Aigleville has since been annexed into Demopolis.
