= Hovey-Winn House =

Historic house in Massachusetts, United States

- U.S. National Register of Historic Places
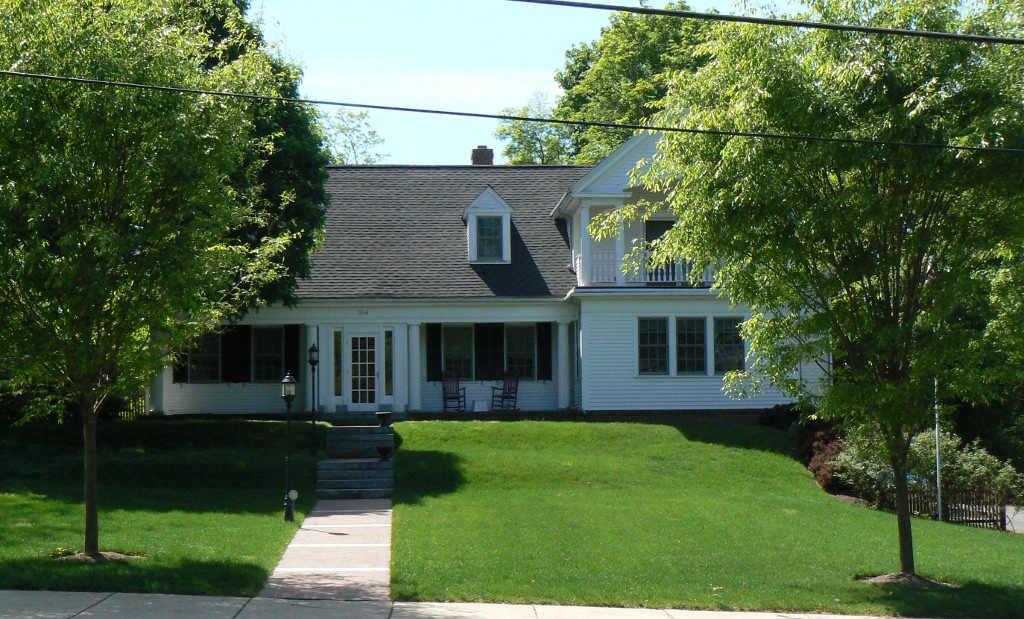

- Location within Massachusetts Location within the United States
- Location: Winchester, Massachusetts
- Coordinates: 42°26′51″N 71°8′6″W
- Built: 1841
- Architect: John H. Coats
- Architectural style: Greek Revival
- MPS: Winchester MRA
- NRHP reference No.: 89000616
- Added to NRHP: July 5, 1989

The Hovey-Winn House is a historic house at 384 Main Street in Winchester, Massachusetts. The 1 1/2-story Greek Revival cottage was built c. 1841 by John Coats, a local housewright who built a number of houses along Main Street. It is one of a small number of local houses (the nearby Horace Hatch House is another) with a side gable roof that overhangs a full-width Doric porch. The house in the 19th century had a number of locally prominent individuals, include Reverend William Eustis, druggist Josiah Hovey, and Hovey's son-in-law Denis Winn, who owned the town's first livery stable.

The house was listed on the National Register of Historic Places in 1989.

== See also ==
- National Register of Historic Places listings in Winchester, Massachusetts
