= Vermont Hatch =

American lawyer

Abram Vermont Hatch (May 14, 1893 – April 4, 1959), was a banking specialist, a member of White & Case, and general counsel of Columbia University.

== Biography ==
He was born in 1893 to Abram Hatch and Ruth Woolley in Heber City, Utah. He graduated from Harvard University and Columbia Law School. In 1935 he built the Vermont Hatch Mansion. He died in 1959 at Columbia University.
