= Horace Hatch House =

Historic house in Massachusetts, United States

- U.S. National Register of Historic Places
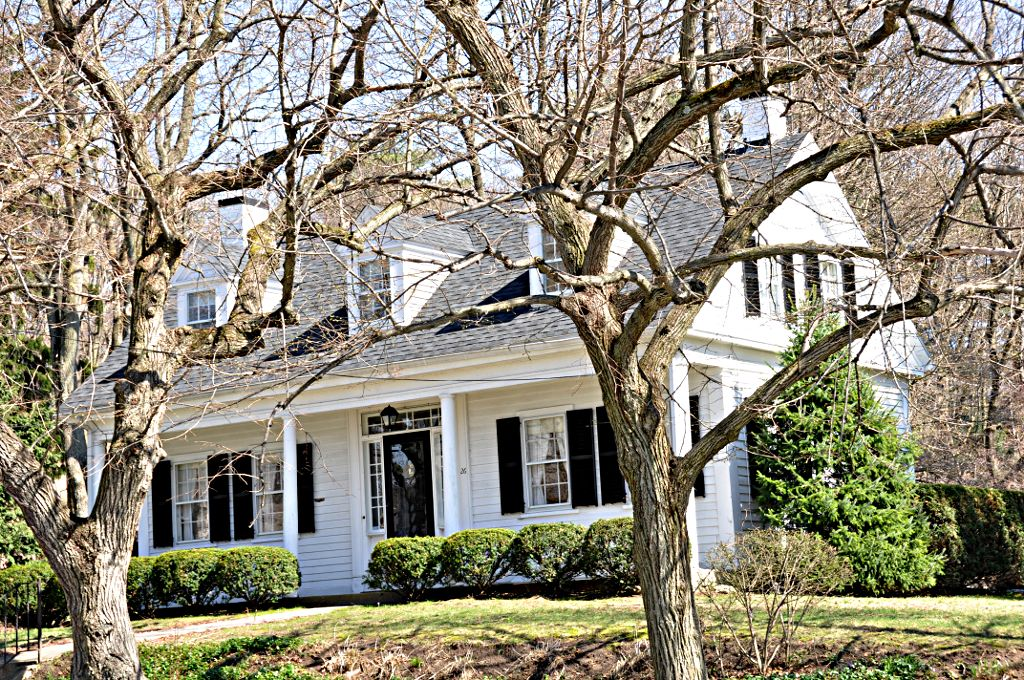

- Location within Massachusetts Location within the United States
- Location: 26 Grove Street, Winchester, Massachusetts
- Coordinates: 42°26′27″N 71°8′27″W
- Built: 1835
- Architectural style: Greek Revival
- MPS: Winchester MRA
- NRHP reference No.: 89000612
- Added to NRHP: July 5, 1989

The Horace Hatch House is a historic house in Winchester, Massachusetts. Originally located on Lloyd Street, this c. 1835 Greek Revival cottage was moved to its present location on Grove Street c. 1843. It is a locally rare example of a side gable Greek Revival cottage whose roof overhangs its full-width front porch. The house is similar to the nearby Hovey-Winn House, and may have been built by the same housewright, John Coats.

The house was listed on the National Register of Historic Places in 1989.

== See also ==
- National Register of Historic Places listings in Winchester, Massachusetts
