= Leopold Chasseriau =

French planter (1825–1891)

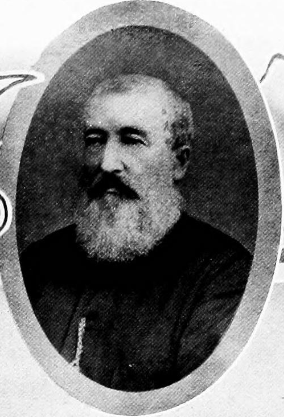
- Born: 1825; Bordeaux, France
- Died: 20 August 1891 (aged 65–66); Aden
- Occupation: Planter
- Known for: Introducing Liberian coffee to the Malay Peninsula

Leopold Chasseriau (1825 – 20 August 1891) was one of the foremost French planters in the Straits Settlements (British Malaya) during the 19th century, establishing the famous Malakoff estate and cultivating tapioca, sugar, and rubber.

== Career ==
Chasseriau was born in Bordeaux, France (into the Chassériau merchant family and was notably a cousin of French diplomat Benoît Chassériau) and came to Penang, Malay Peninsula, during the 1840s after visiting Mauritius where he was briefly engaged in sugar planting. He soon opened a plantation, the Jawee estate, in Province Wellesley, and then acquired another estate which he renamed "Malakoff" after the victory in the Crimean War. First cultivating coconuts, he changed to growing sugar and tapioca, and built a tapioca factory.

After many years he returned to France and purchased several large vineyards which initially proved successful but in 1870 were all destroyed by the Grape phylloxera pest. He decided to return to the Straits Settlements where sold his share in the Malakoff estate for $20,000 and settled in Singapore.

There he purchased land on which he built a residence, and began planting tapioca again on 1,000 acres. In recognition of his services to the science of planting he received a free grant of a further 2,000 acres from the Governor of the Straits Settlements, Andrew Clarke. Due to his skilful management, the property became known as "the model estate of the southern peninsula".

However, his success was short lived as the price of tapioca soon fell, and in 1886 he sold his estate to a company and began cultivating Liberian coffee, whilst he stayed on in the position of managing director for a further five years.

On 5 August 1891, he left Singapore for France aboard the S.S. Natal. During the voyage he seriously injured his leg in an accident and was landed at Aden where he was admitted to hospital. The following day he developed a fever caused by an infection, and died the next day.
