= William H. Hatch House =

Historic house in Illinois, United States

- U.S. National Register of Historic Places
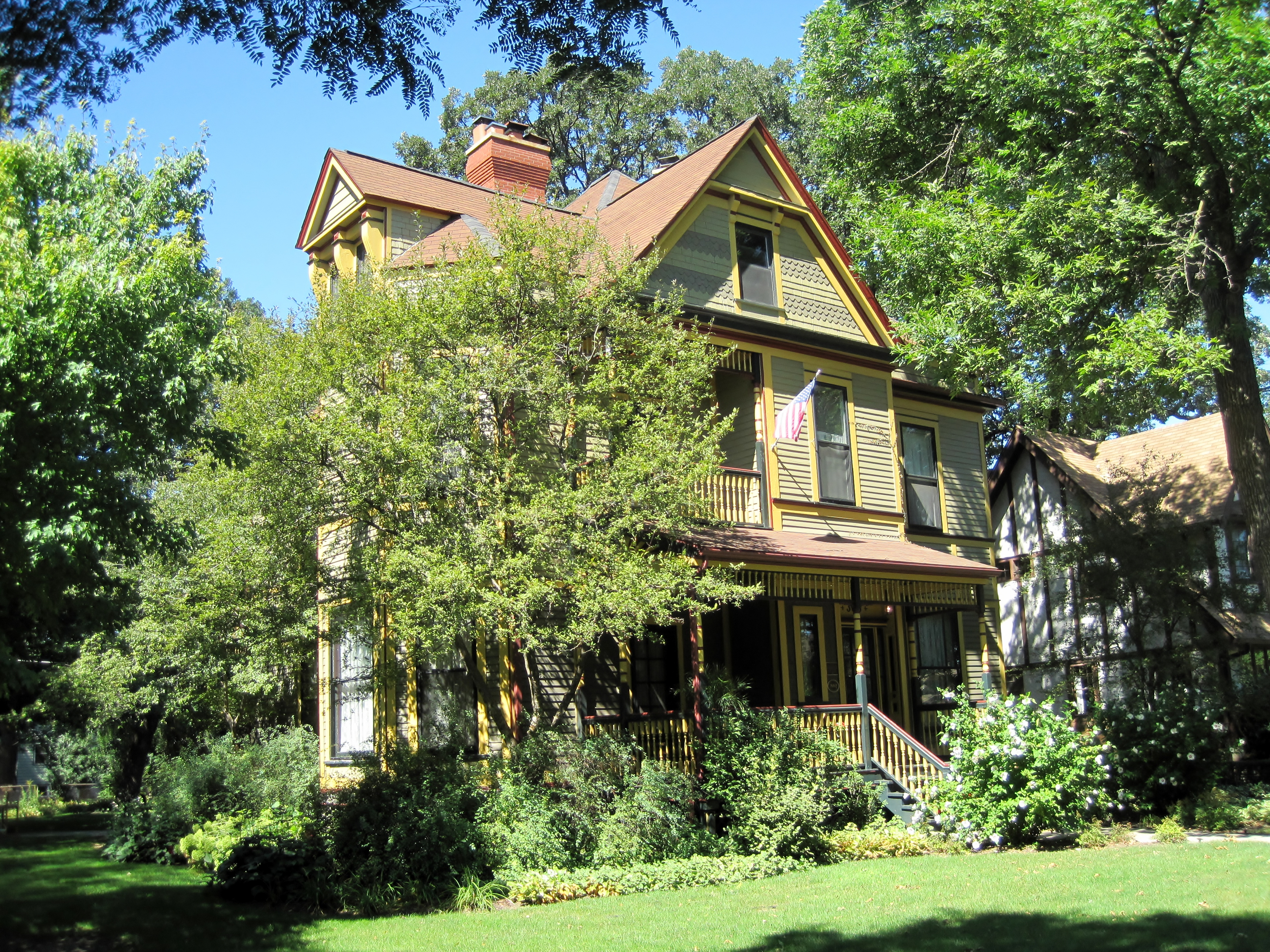

- Location within Chicago metropolitan area Location within Illinois Location within the United States
- Location: 306 Keystone Ave., River Forest, Illinois
- Coordinates: 41°53′12″N 87°49′05″W
- Area: less than one acre
- Built: 1882
- Architectural style: Queen Anne
- NRHP reference No.: 07000898
- Added to NRHP: September 5, 2007

The William H. Hatch House is a historic house at 306 Keystone Avenue Keystone Avenue in River Forest, Illinois. Grain trader William H. Hatch built the house for his family in 1882, early in the village's development and two years after its incorporation. The house has a Queen Anne style design, a popular choice both locally and nationally at the time. The design includes three spindlework porches, a tower at the southeast corner, and a shingled gable atop the front and rear facades. The emphasis on spindlework, while common in early Queen Anne designs, is unusual among examples of the style in River Forest.

The house was added to the National Register of Historic Places on September 5, 2007.
