= Charles Frédéric Chassériau =

French painter

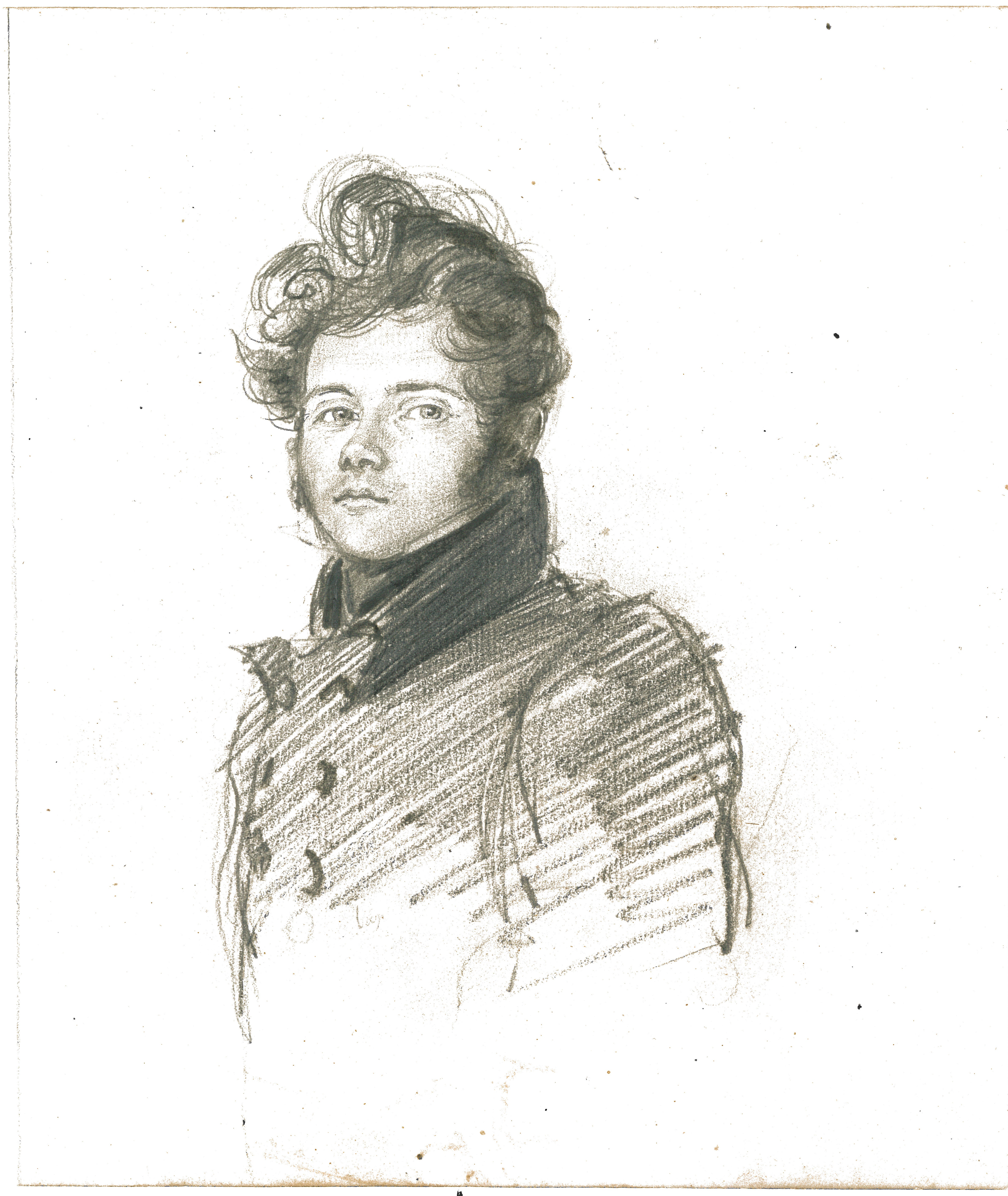
- Self-portrait (1825)

Chief architect of the cities of Marseille, Algiers and Cairo
- Monarch: Napoleon III

Personal details
- Born: 29 January 1802 Port-au-Prince, Saint-Domingue
- Died: 11 January 1896 (aged 93) Vars-sur-Roseix, France
- Spouse(s): Josephine Warrain, daughter of Alexandre Warrain, ship-owner and mayor of Marseille

Baron Charles Frédéric Chassériau du Chiron (29 January 1802 – 11 January 1896) was a Saint Dominican architect and painter, who served as chief architect of the cities of Marseille, Algiers, in Algeria; and Cairo, in Egypt. He is particularly known for having designed the seafront of the city of Algiers.

== Biography ==
His parents, owners of the Le Beau estate in Saint-Domingue, then a French colony, had to leave Port-au-Prince in 1802, only a few months after he was born. After his studies at the Lycée Henri-IV and in memory of his father, the General of the Empire, Victor Frédéric Chassériau, he was first destined for a career in arms and was received at the Schools of Saint-Cyr Coëtquidan in 1819. However, he was unable to attend the School because his family was ruined by the Haitian Revolution and the revolt in Saint-Domingue, and did not have enough resources to pay his board. After the death of his father and having already lost his mother, he was taken in by his uncle Benoît Chassériau, father of the painter Théodore Chassériau. The generals Jean-Baptiste Milhaud and Augustin-Daniel Belliard, as a token of their affection for General Chassériau, offered Charles-Frédéric, who had just been admitted to the Saint-Cyr, to pay him the pension that the State refused him. Out of pride and although grateful, he did not believe he had to accept and did not become a soldier.

He first entered a notary's office in 1821 but decided to become an architect, he stayed 10 months in the workshop of Jean-François-Julien Mesnager in 1823. On 3 April 1824, he was received as a pupil-titular of the Ecole des beaux-arts de Paris He began the same year with Jacques Lacornée and François Édouard Picot and then in the office of his relative François Mazois, inspector of civil buildings, who had him collaborate in his work on the construction of the Cour des comptes that was to be decorated twenty years later by his cousin Théodore Chassériau, as well as in his work on the ruins of Pompeii. A watercolor by Frédéric Chassériau painted on the ruins of Pompeii is kept at the Metropolitan Museum of Art in New York and is included in the book "Les Ruines de Pompéi" (The Ruins of Pompeii) by Mazois ("Triclinium discovered from the House of Actaeon"). In 1830, taken up by his military ambitions, he campaigned in the Spanish republican army as aide-de-camp to General Antonio Quiroga, thanks to Felix Lepeletier de Saint Fargeau, who had been the intermediary between him and Quiroga.

=== Architect in Cairo from 1830 to 1833 ===
In Egypt from 1830 to 1833, he was architect of the Lazaret of Alexandria and drew up the plans for the consulate in Alexandria at the request of the vice-consul Ferdinand de Lesseps, then returned to France. The Consulate of France, located on the famous Place des Consuls, was completely destroyed during the bombing of Alexandria by the British in July 1882.

=== Chief Architect of the City of Marseille from 1833 to 1839 ===
In 1833, he became assistant architect for the city of Marseille and then quickly chief architect until 1839. He built the Timone Hospital, the Capuchin Hall, the Friuli Archipelago, the Friuliangars of Friuli, and the small white triumphal arch of the Place Jules-Guesde at the Porte d'Aix.

In 1840, Charles-Frédéric Chassériau, as well as his cousin the painter Théodore Chassériau, proposed his project for the tomb of the Emperor Napoleon at the Hôtel des Invalides, a project inspired by the work of Horace. At the same time, Charles-Frédéric Chassériau was close to King Joseph Bonaparte, who lived on Rue Provence in Paris and with whom he visited the studios of neighboring artists, including that of Eugène Delacroix and François-Édouard Picot, according to notes left by his son Baron Arthur Chassériau.

=== Chief architect of the City of Algiers from 1849 ===
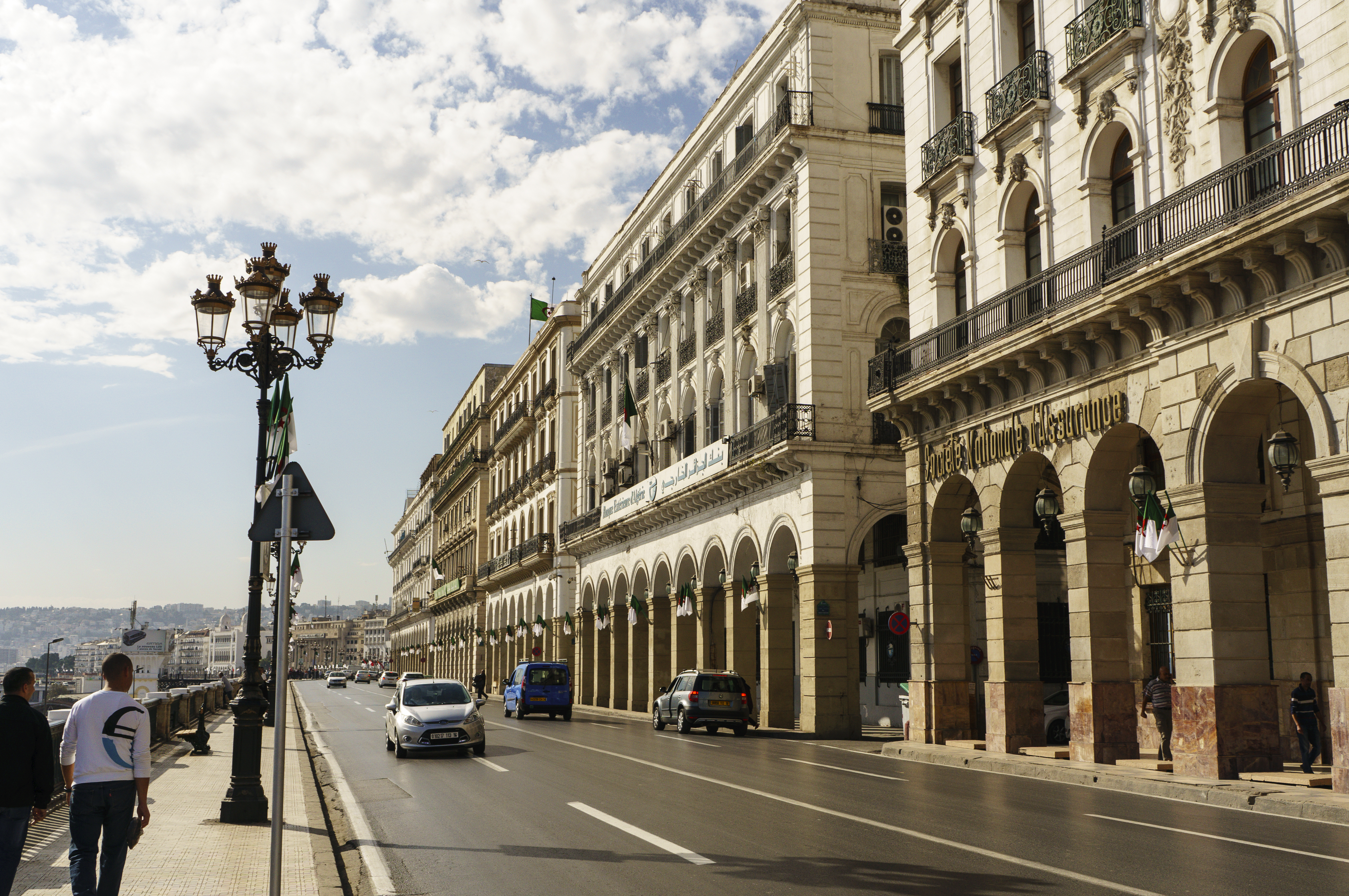
Partial view of Boulevard de l'Impératrice, Algiers waterfront

Appointed chief architect of Algiers in 1849, Chassériau gave up his functions to build, on his plans, in this city, with the assistance of Mr. Sarlin and Mr. Ponsard, the theater which rises on the Bresson square. In 1869. he resumed his job as chief architect, and kept it until 1870, when he was dismissed, with part of his service, as a result of a new organization. He was appointed in August 1870, Adjutant Major Captain of the Legion of Algiers (Militia of the Commune of Algiers).

In Algiers, he was appointed three times chief architect of the city of Algiers (1849, 1859 and 1874) and retired in 1882. Chassériau died at the age of 94 years. He was then the dean of the Saint Cyrians.

Chassériau is known mainly as the author of the Boulevard de l'Impératrice and the seafront of Algiers which were inaugurated in 1865 by the emperor Napoleon III and the impératrice Eugénie.

== Family ==
Son of the Napoleonic general and baron Victor Frédéric Chassériau, he was the father of three children, including the art collector Arthur Chassériau. His other relatives included the painter Théodore Chassériau, whose 1846 portrait of Charles Frédéric's wife Joséphine is now in the Art Institute of Chicago.

== Drawings in museums ==
- Triclinium découvert de la maison dite d'Actéon á Pompéi - Pen and black ink; watercolor, New York City, The Metropolitan Museum of Art
- Projet d'établissement d'un marché aux fleurs et aux fruits, quai aux Fleurs, près le palais de Justice, adressé à monsieur le comte de Chabrol de Volvic, préfet du département de la Seine – Pen and black ink; watercolor (1828), Paris, Musée Carnavalet
- Plans du Palais de justice d'Alger présentée à l'Empereur Napoléon III – Pen and black ink (1865), Algiers, National Museum of Fine Arts of Algiers
- Fragments des haut reliefs de l'arc de Triomphe de Marseille – 3 drawings, Musée du Vieux Marseille

== Gallery ==
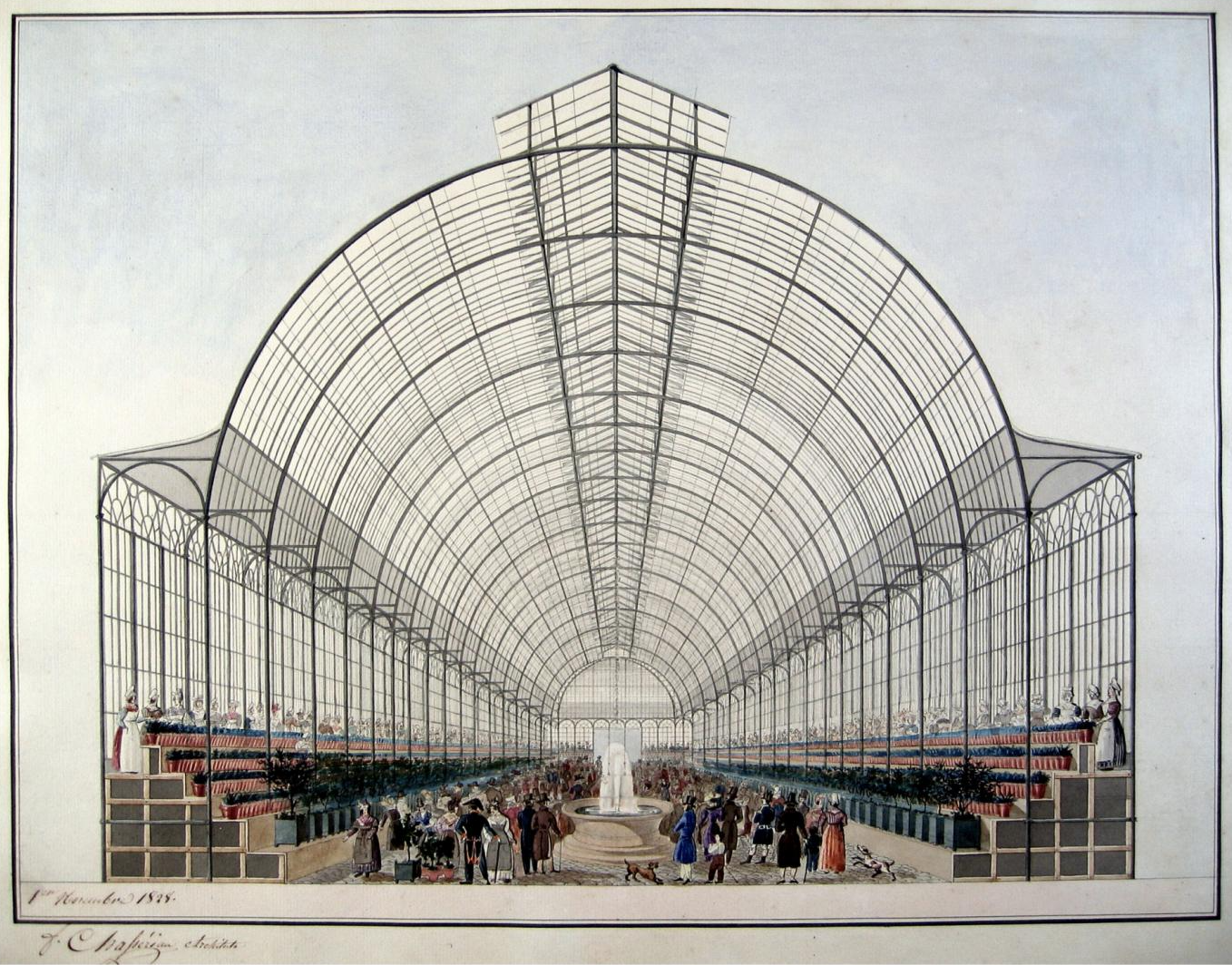
Baron Frédéric Chassériau, "Vue intérieure du projet d'un marché aux fleurs et aux fruits, quai aux Fleurs" (1828), dessin conservé au musée Carnavalet, Paris

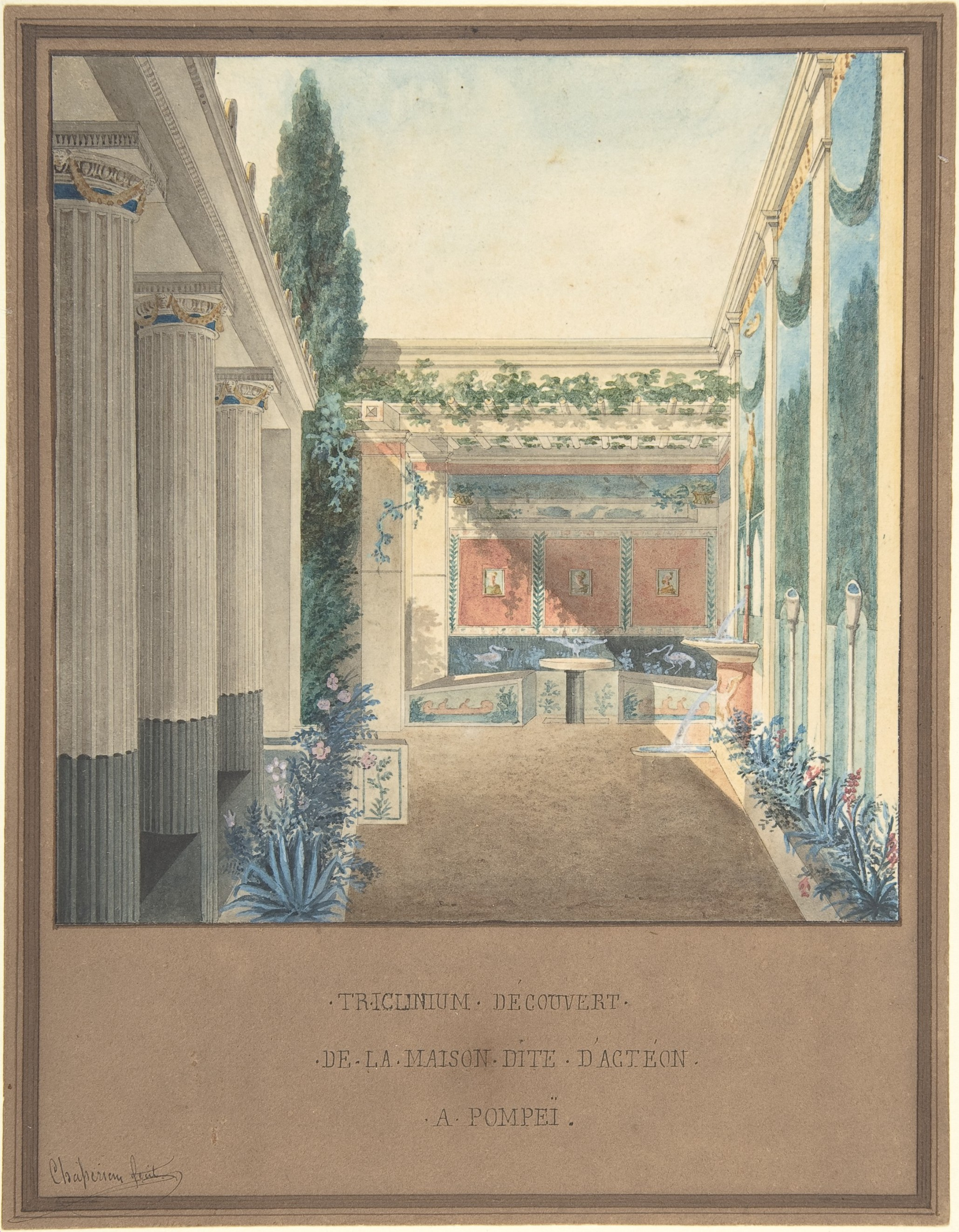
Baron Frédéric Chassériau, "Triclinium découvert de la maison dite d'Actéon à Pompéi" (1824), dessin conservé au Metropolitan Museum of Art, New York City

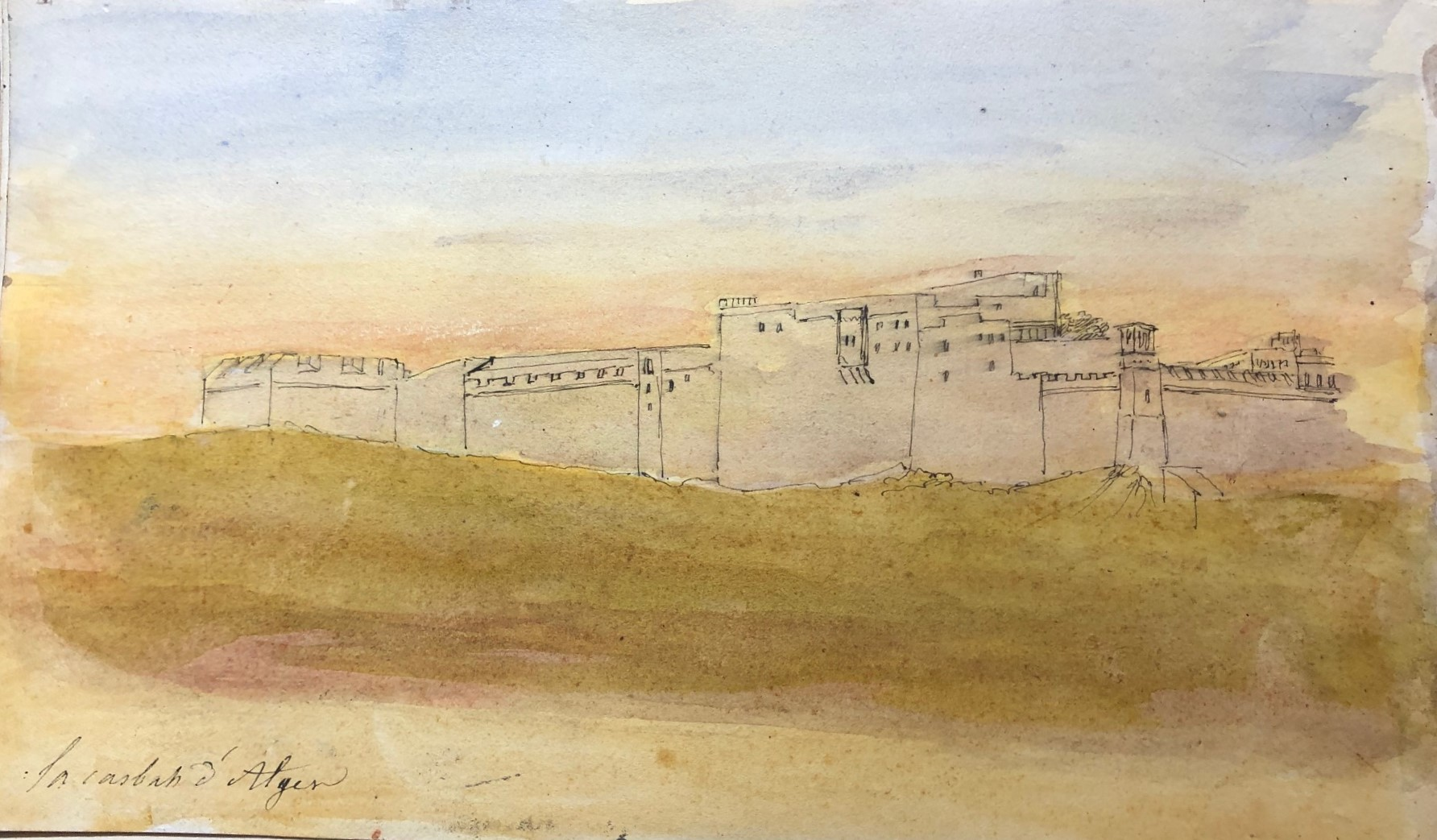
Charles-Frédéric Chassériau, "La Casbah d'Alger" (1840)

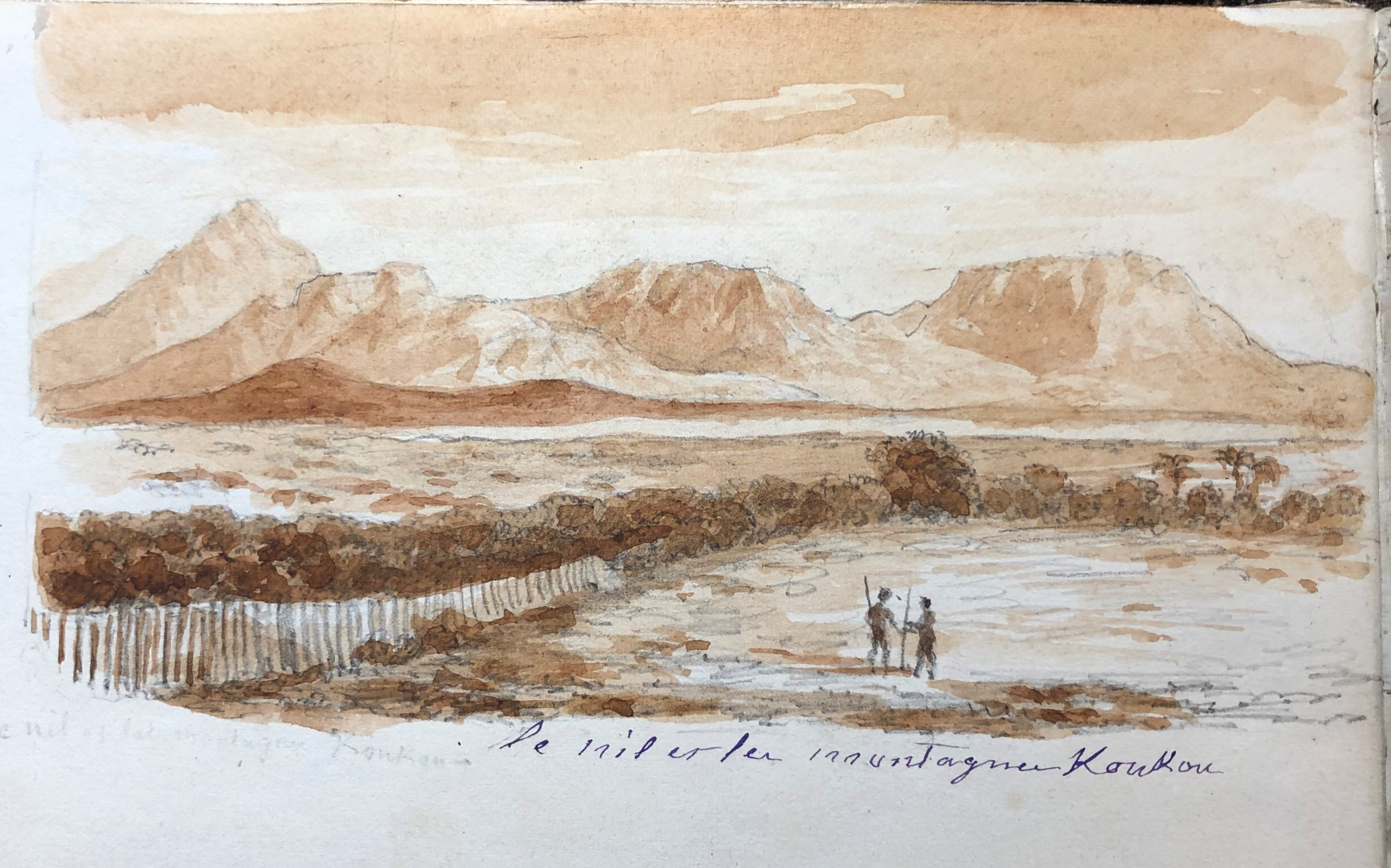
Charles-Frédéric Chassériau, "Paysage d'Egypte sur les bords du Nil" (1830)

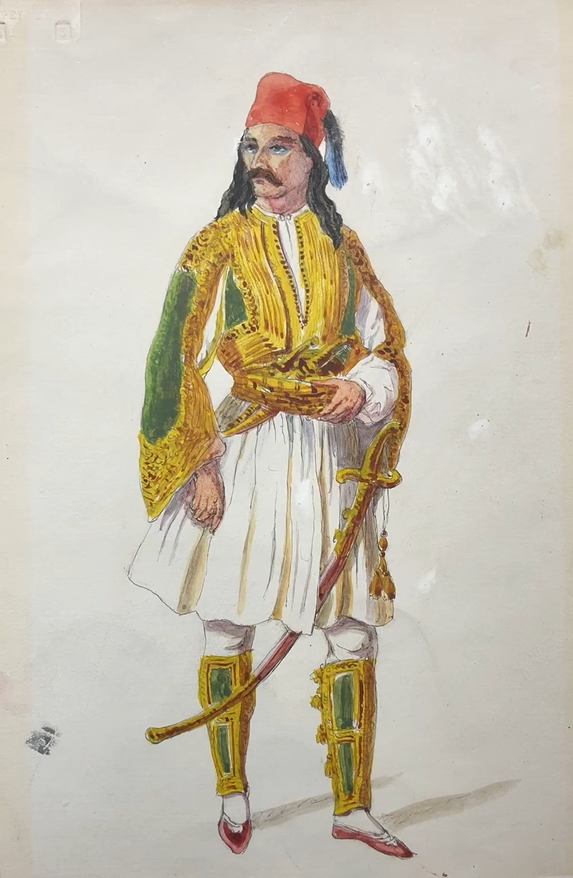
Charles-Frédéric Chassériau, "Soldat grec" (1825)

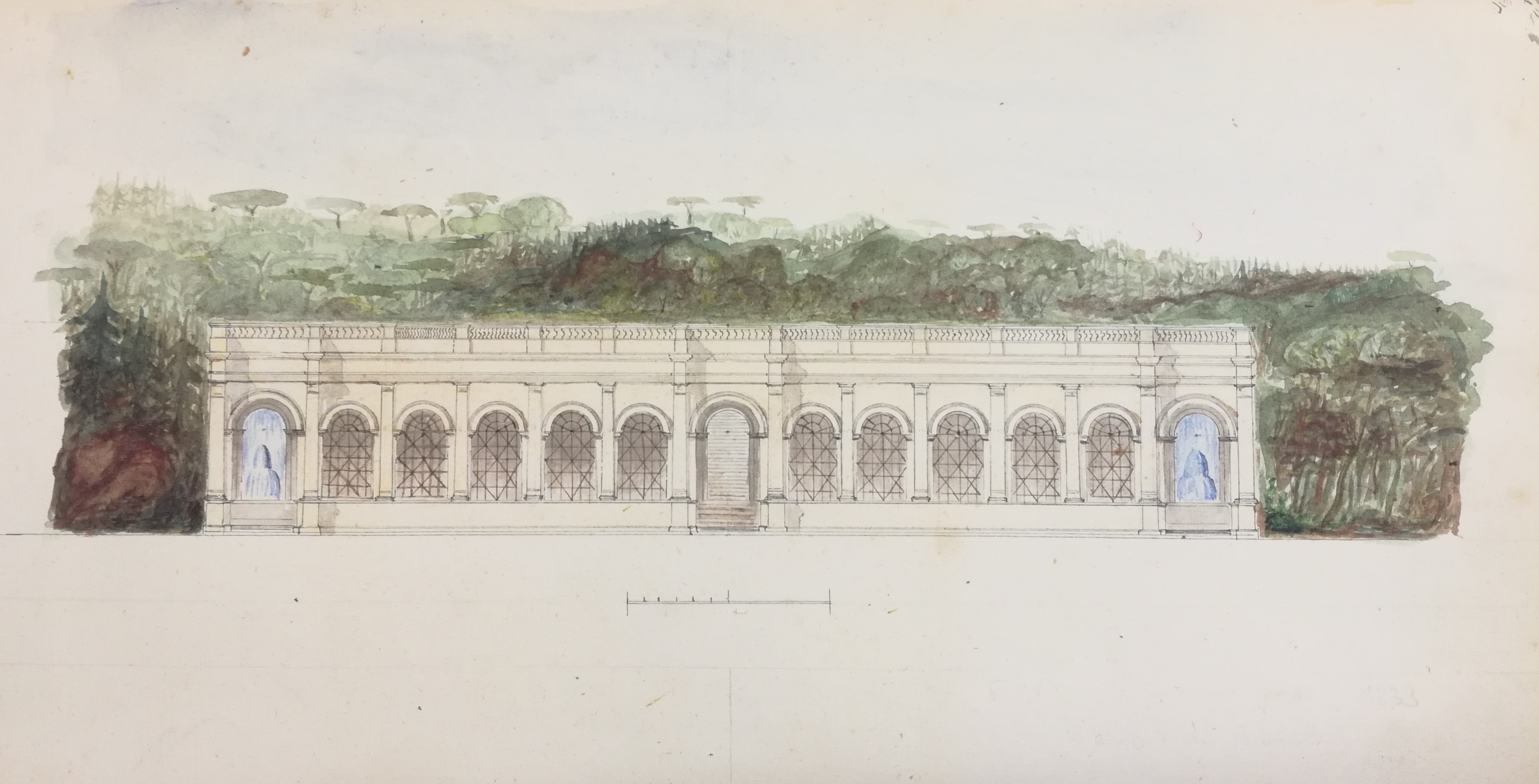
Charles-Frédéric Chassériau, "Projet d'orangerie et de fontaines dans les environs de Marseille" (1839)

== Awards ==
- The Rampe Frédéric Chassériau in Algiers in homage to the architect: street in Algiers parallel to the port and close to the Agha train station.
- Member of the Academie de Marseille, chair n°33 – 1839
- Dean of the École spéciale militaire de Saint-Cyr at his death in 1896.
- Corresponding member of the Institut historique de Paris- 1834 (5 class – History of Fine Arts under the presidency of Louis-Pierre Baltard).
- Perpetual member in 1854 of the Taylor Foundation.
- Member of the Society for the Exploration of Carthage, founded in 1837 by Adolphe Dureau de la Malle.
- Member of the National Society for the Protection of Nature (1859)
- Donor of the National Museum of Fine Arts of Algiers: in May 1860, donation of a large bronze statue of the Emperor Commodus

== Bibliography ==
- "Le Glaive et le Compas - Charles-Frédéric Chassériau (1802-1896), de Pompéi à Alger, le parcours d’un architecte français" par Jean-Baptiste Nouvion, Préface de Dominique de Font-Réaulx, LAC Editions, 2022
- "La Cour des comptes au Palais d'Orsay. Chronique d'un drame de pierre" par Jean-Michel Leniaud, directeur d’études à l’École pratique des hautes études et professeur à l’École nationale des chartes, La Documentation Française, 2021 (p. 77-79)
- "Architecture urbaine et urbanisme en Algérie sous le Second empire : le cas de l’architecte Charles-Frédéric Chassériau (1802-1896)" par Gérard Monnier, (Culture et création dans l’Architecture provinciale de Louis XIV à Napoléon III) – Travaux et colloques de l’Institut d’Art, Aix-en-Provence, Publications de l'université de Provence, 1983
- "A Drawing by Chassériau" par Joan R. Mertens, Metropolitan Museum Journal, Vol. 15, éd. The University of Chicago Press on behalf of The Metropolitan Museum of Art, 1980 (p. 153-156)
- "Une façade pour Alger : le boulevard de l’Impératrice", Catalogue de l'exposition par Federico Cresti, Paris, Palais de la Porte Dorée 25 juin-14 septembre 2003, Les éditions de l’Imprimeur, 2003
- "Alger : Ville & architecture 1830-1940" par Claudine Piaton, Juliette Hueber, Boussad Aiche et Thierry Lochard; avec les contributions de Malik Chebahi et Nabila Cherif; photographies d'Arnaud du Boistesselin. Arles : Éditions Honoré Clair; Alger : Éditions Barzakh, 2016 (p. 334-335)
- "Destin d’Alger" par Jean Alazard, Revue des Deux Mondes (15 février 1951) (p. 692-698)
- "Die Bildenden Künstler aller Zeiten und Völker" Register zu den Bänden 11–20, K.G. Saur Verlag, München, 1998 (p. 257 Haiti Architekt 1802 Chassériau, Charles)
