= Vine and Olive Colony =

19th century settlement effort in Alabama, US

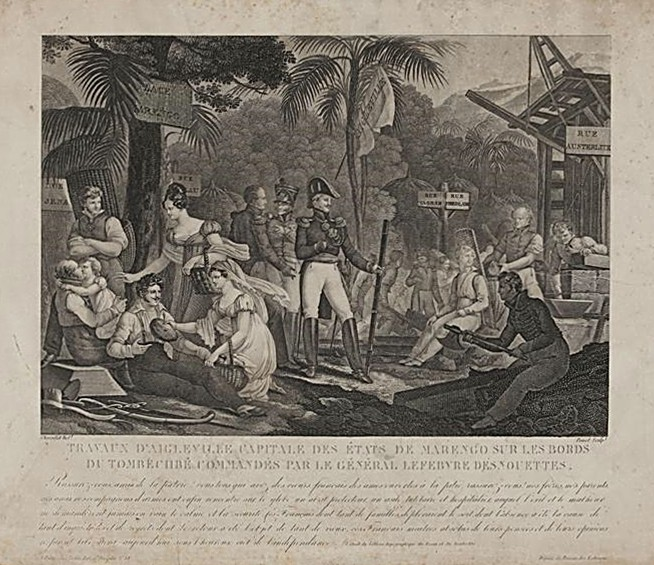
1819 French engraving entitled Construction of Aigleville, Capital of the State of Marengo, on the Banks of the Tombechbé, Directed by General Lefebvre-Desnouettes.

The Vine and Olive Colony was an effort by a group of French Bonapartists who, fearing for their lives after the fall of Napoleon and the Bourbon Restoration, attempted to establish an agricultural settlement growing wine grapes and olive trees in the Alabama wilderness. The area that they settled later became the counties of Marengo and Hale.

== Founding ==
The Vine and Olive Colony was an effort started by the French Emigrant Association, made up of high-ranking officials and followers of Napoleon fearing for their lives after the restoration of Louis XVIII to the French throne. In the fall of 1816 the group, headed by the former General Charles Lallemand, decided to petition Washington, D.C. for four townships upon which they could settle. They began scouting the western frontiers of the Southern United States for an appropriate place upon which to establish their endeavor, with a location at the confluence of the Black Warrior and Tombigbee Rivers being chosen after being recommended by other western pioneers. The United States Congress agreed to allow them to settle and on 3 March 1817 approved an act that granted them four contiguous townships totaling 92,160 acres (373.0 km^{2}) of land for the price of $2 per acre on the condition that they cultivate grapes and olives. This condition was because several other Bonapartist colonies in the world were thought to be little more than military operations with the intention of returning Napoleon to power.

After their journey across the Atlantic, they first arrived in Philadelphia, Pennsylvania, where the largest group of settlers chartered a schooner, the McDonough, to sail them from Philadelphia to Mobile, Alabama. They arrived in Mobile by 26 May 1817 and began the ascent up the rivers. En route, the party stopped at Fort Stoddert and then Fort Montgomery, where they met General Edmund P. Gaines. The group arrived at their destination of Ecor Blanc, literally meaning White Bluff or White Cliff, on the Tombigbee River by 14 July 1817.

The most prominent and wealthy immigrants was Count Charles Lefebvre Desnouettes, who had been a cavalry officer with the rank of Lieutenant-General under Napoleon. He was to serve as the leader of the colony. Other prominent settlers included Lieutenant-General Baron Henri-Dominique Lallemand, brother of Charles, Count Bertrand Clausel, Joseph Lakanal, Simon Chaudron, Benoît Chassériau, Pasqual Luciani, Colonel Jean-Jerome Cluis, Jean-Marie Chapron, Colonel Nicholas Raoul, and Frederic Ravesies. The colonists, about 200 people, soon established the town of Demopolis, or "City of the People", on top of White Bluff, but following a survey in August 1818, they learned that their actual land grants began less than a mile to the east of their newly cleared land. After abandoning the settlement of Demopolis, they soon established two other towns, Aigleville and Arcola. Aigleville was named in honor of Napoleon's ensign, featuring an eagle. Arcola was named for the Battle of the Bridge of Arcole, site of a Napoleonic victory in 1796. Arcola became the largest town in the colony.

== Decline ==
After settling into their new surroundings, the colonists soon discovered that their land was not suited to fulfill the condition placed by Congress on their grants, the cultivation of grapes or olives. The colony sent a representative, Charles Villar, to Washington to plead their case and Congress complied with a supplementary act on 26 April 1822 that allowed the settlers to retain their land in the event that growing grapes and olives proved fruitless. In addition, the colony had few laborers, faced a constant encroachment on their territory by American squatters, and experienced floods and droughts in these first few years. All of these factors led to the eventual collapse of the colony. After 1825, most of the settlers left the colony to return to France or settle in Mobile or New Orleans, Louisiana, although a few did stay on their grants permanently.

== Legacy ==
Demopolis continues as a town into the present day; Aigleville and Arcola were largely gone by the eve of the American Civil War. The settlers' efforts are remembered by the name of the county, Marengo, and the name of the county seat, Linden. The county was named Marengo to commemorate Napoleon's victory at the Battle of Marengo over the Austrian armies on 14 June 1800. The county seat was originally known as the Town of Marengo, but in 1823 the name was changed to Linden. Linden is a shortened version of Hohenlinden, scene of another Napoleonic victory in Bavaria in 1800.

== See also ==
- Aigleville (Alabama)
- Arcola, Alabama
- Champ d'Asile, a separate settlement in Texas founded by people from this colony
- Demopolis, Alabama

== Bibliography ==
- Blaufard, Rafe. Bonapartists in the Borderlands: French Exiles and Refugees on the Gulf Coast, 1815-1835. Tuscaloosa: University of Alabama Press, 2006.
- Martin, Thomas. 1937. French military adventurers in Alabama, 1818-1828. Princeton University Press.
- Whitfield, Gaius. 1904. The French Grant in Alabama: A History of the Founding of Demopolis. Historical Papers, 1st-2d Ser.
