= Victor Frédéric Chassériau =

French general

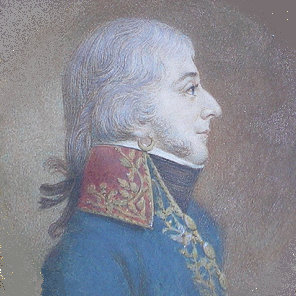
General Baron Frédéric Chassériau in uniform of the Superior Council of the Island of Saint-Domingue

Baron Victor Frédéric Chassériau du Chiron (19 October 1774 – 18 June 1815) was a French general of the Napoleonic Wars, who died during the Battle of Waterloo when serving as chief of staff to general Comte Milhaud.

== Life ==
Chassériau was born in La Rochelle. He first joined the army on 12 September 1791, becoming a sous-lieutenant in the régiment de Berwick on 15 September 1791 and rising to lieutenant on 10 November 1791. He left in 1792 in Saint-Domingue as lieutenant in the second battalion of the régiment de Berwick during the first expedition. That same year, the commissioners Étienne Polverel and Léger-Félicité Sonthonax dismiss and imprison the senior officers of the regiment. Without any form of judgment, they dismissed and also sentenced Chassériau and the six other officers to deportation. The latter refused to leave the island for fear of falling under English power. Chassériau is the only officer to escape alive. He escapes from prison after eight months of detention and returns to the American continent before joining France. He was appointed captain commanding the grenadiers in the 66th regiment on 15 Frimaire, year XII. In the meantime he had been shot in the right thigh in Saint-Domingue in 1793 during the Platous affair.

He then became aide de camp to general Olivier Harty on 13 September 1806, before being attached to the staff of the grand-duc de Berg. He moved to the army fighting in the Peninsular War on 9 April 1808, becoming chef d'escadron in the dragons d'Espagne and being attached to the staff of comte Belliard on 23 January 1811. During that time he was wounded on 8 January 1809 at Belris.

He then moved to the staff of general baron Daultanne, then serving as chief of staff to the armée du Centre from September 1811 to 15 May 1812. He then became chief of staff to general baron Beaumont before being put in command of the light cavalry of 12th Corps on 13 June 1813. He became adjutant commanding on 18 June 1813, then chief of staff to comte Milhaud. He was wounded in the right hand by a musket ball on 18 October 1813 at Leipzig. He was then made a member of the Légion d'honneur on 4 November 1813 (rising to officer of the order on 25 February the following year) and finally commander in chief of 4th Reserve Cavalry Corps on 6 November 1813.

He was also made a baron of the empire on 3 April 1814 and a knight of the order of Saint Louis on 11 October 1814.

According to the news given to his family following the Hundred Days, he was made a général de brigade on 16 June 1815.

He was killed at Waterloo on 18 June that year, in the last charge on Mont Saint-Jean on the evening of the battle, leading the cuirassiers of general comte Milhau, to whom he was again chief of staff.

== Family ==
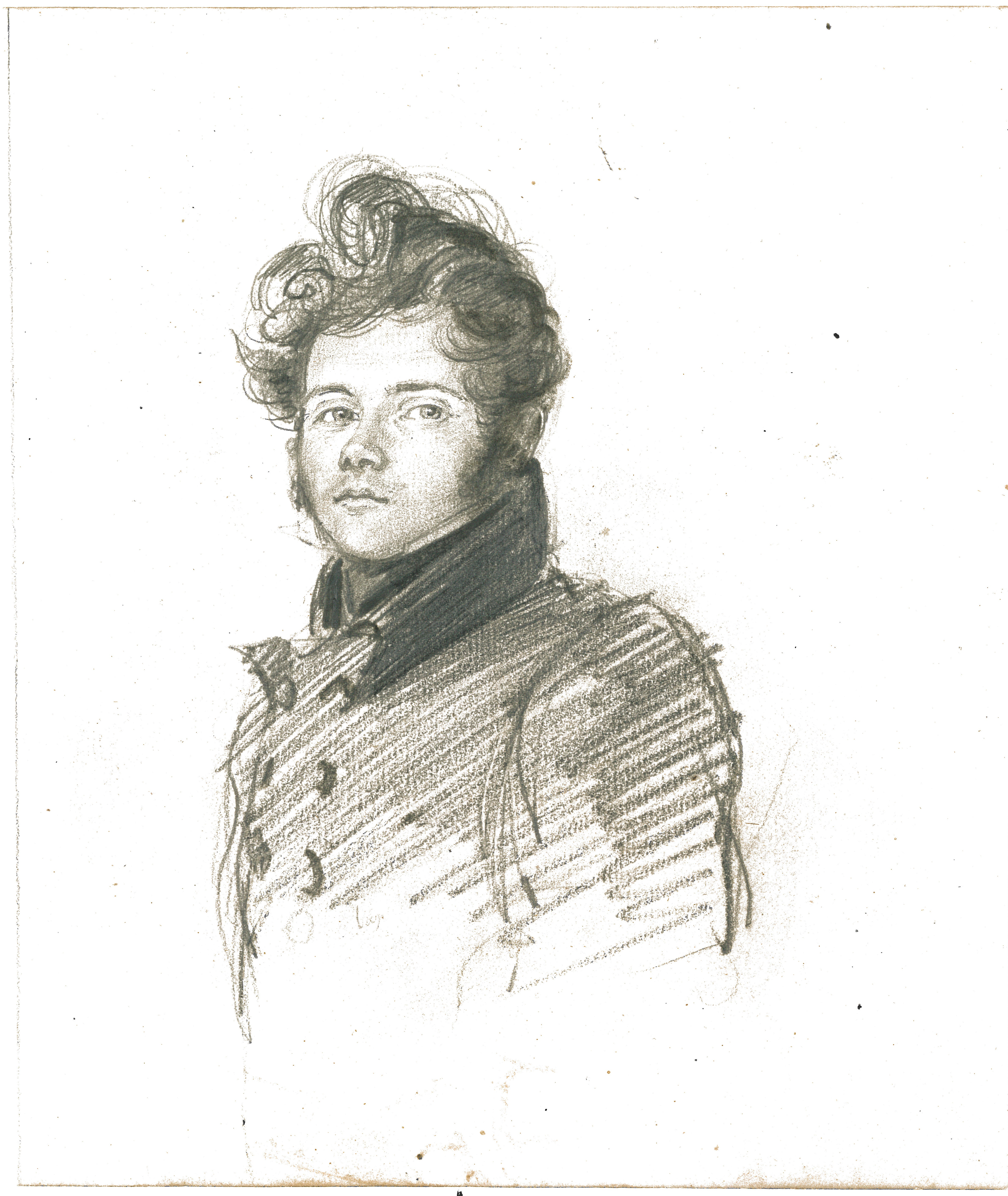
Selfportrait of baron Charles Frédéric Chassériau, 1825

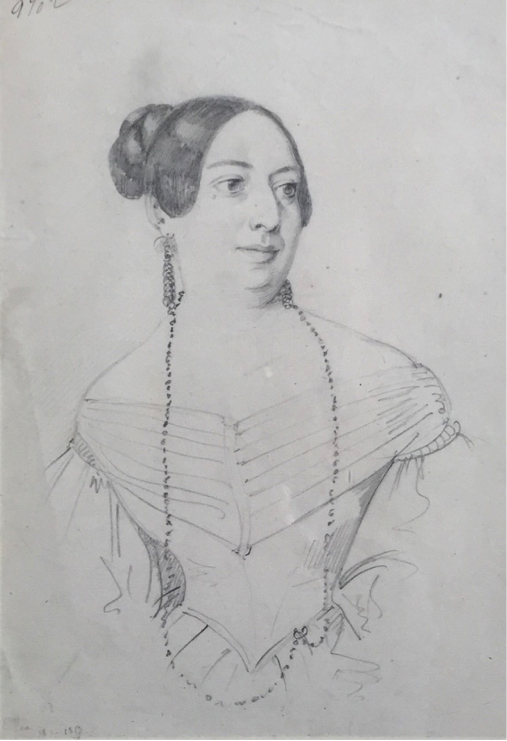
Portrait of Elisabeth Chassériau by Théodore Chassériau (1819–1856), 1836, Graphite – 23 x 20 cm

General Chassériau had married in 1798 Elisabeth Ranson, a Creole from Saint-Domingue who belonged to a large family of Protestant shipowners from La Rochelle. Owners of a coffee plantation, the Habitation Le Beau near Jérémie, they lived until 1802 in Port-au-Prince. From their marriage were born 3 children, who became wards of the Nation, were admitted to Lycée Napoléon and to Maison d'éducation de la Légion d'honneur:

- Louis Arthur Chassériau, general manager of the imperial household under Napoleon III
- Charles Frédéric Chassériau, chief architect to the town of Algiers
- Elisabeth Chassériau

General Chassériau was the brother of diplomat and spy Benoît Chassériau.

== Bibliography ==
- "Victor Frédéric Chassériau, La Rochelle 1774 — Waterloo 1815", Cahiers d'Histoire régionale, d'art et de littérature, Société rochelaise d'Histoire moderne et contemporaine Edition, La Rochelle, n°14, 2006
- Jean-Baptiste Nouvion, Patrick Puigmal (préface), "L'ami des Colombiens, Benoît Chassériau (1780–1844)", LAC Editions, Paris, 2018 ISBN 978-2-9565297-0-5 (General Frédéric Chassériau life in pages 19 to 21)
- Jean-Baptiste Nouvion, "Crépuscule d'une plantation de café à Saint-Domingue, L’habitation Le Beau (1791–1798)", LAC éditions, Paris, 2020
