= Joseph Lakanal =

French politician (1762–1845)

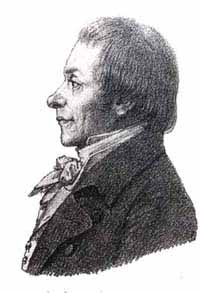
- Born: 14 July 1762; Serres, Kingdom of France
- Died: 14 February 1845 (aged 82); Paris, France
- Scientific career
- Workplaces: Institut de France

Joseph Lakanal (14 July 1762 – 14 February 1845) was a French politician, and an original member of the Institut de France.

== Early career ==
Born in Serres, in present-day Ariège, his name was originally Lacanal, and was altered to distinguish him from his Royalist brothers. He studied theology, and joined one of the teaching congregations (Pères de la Doctrine Chrétienne), and for fourteen years taught in their schools. He was professor of rhetoric at Bourges, and of philosophy at Moulins.

He was elected by his native département to the National Convention of the French Republic in 1792, where he sat until 1795; Lakanal was one of the noted administrators of the French Revolution. At the time of his election, he was acting as vicar to his uncle Bernard Font (1723–1800), the constitutional bishop of Pamiers. In the convention, he sat with The Mountain and voted for the execution of King Louis XVI.

== Projects and reforms ==
Lakanal became a member of the Committee of Public Instruction early in 1793, and after carrying many useful decrees on the preservation of national monuments, on the military schools, on the reorganization of the Jardin des Plantes as the Muséum national d'Histoire naturelle, and other matters (such as the creation of the École publique des Langues Orientales vivantes), he brought forward on 26 June his Projet d'éducation nationale (printed at the Imprimerie Nationale), which proposed to lay the burden of primary education on the public funds, but to leave secondary education to private enterprise; public fêtes were also assigned specified sums, and a central commission was to be entrusted with educational questions.

The project, to which Emmanuel Joseph Sieyès also contributed, was refused by the convention, who submitted the whole question to a special Commission of six, which, under the influence of Maximilien Robespierre, adopted a report by Louis-Michel Le Peletier de Saint-Fargeau (shortly before his death).

Lakanal, who was a member of the commission, now began to work for the organization of higher education, and, abandoning the principle of his Projet, advocated the establishment of state-aided schools for primary, secondary and university education. In October 1793, he was sent by the convention to the south-western départements and did not return to Paris until after the revolution of Thermidor that toppled Robespierre.

== Thermidor and Directory ==
He became president of the Education Committee, and promptly abolished the system which had had Robespierre's support. He drew up schemes for normal schools of départements, for primary schools (in accordance with his previous Projet) and central schools; Lakanal accepted resolutions against his own system, but continued his educational reforms after his election to the Council of the Five Hundred in 1795.

In 1799 he was sent by the Directory to organize the defence of the four départments on the left bank of the Rhine (in present-day Germany), threatened by the invasion of counter-Revolution forces (the Second Coalition).

== Later life and exile ==
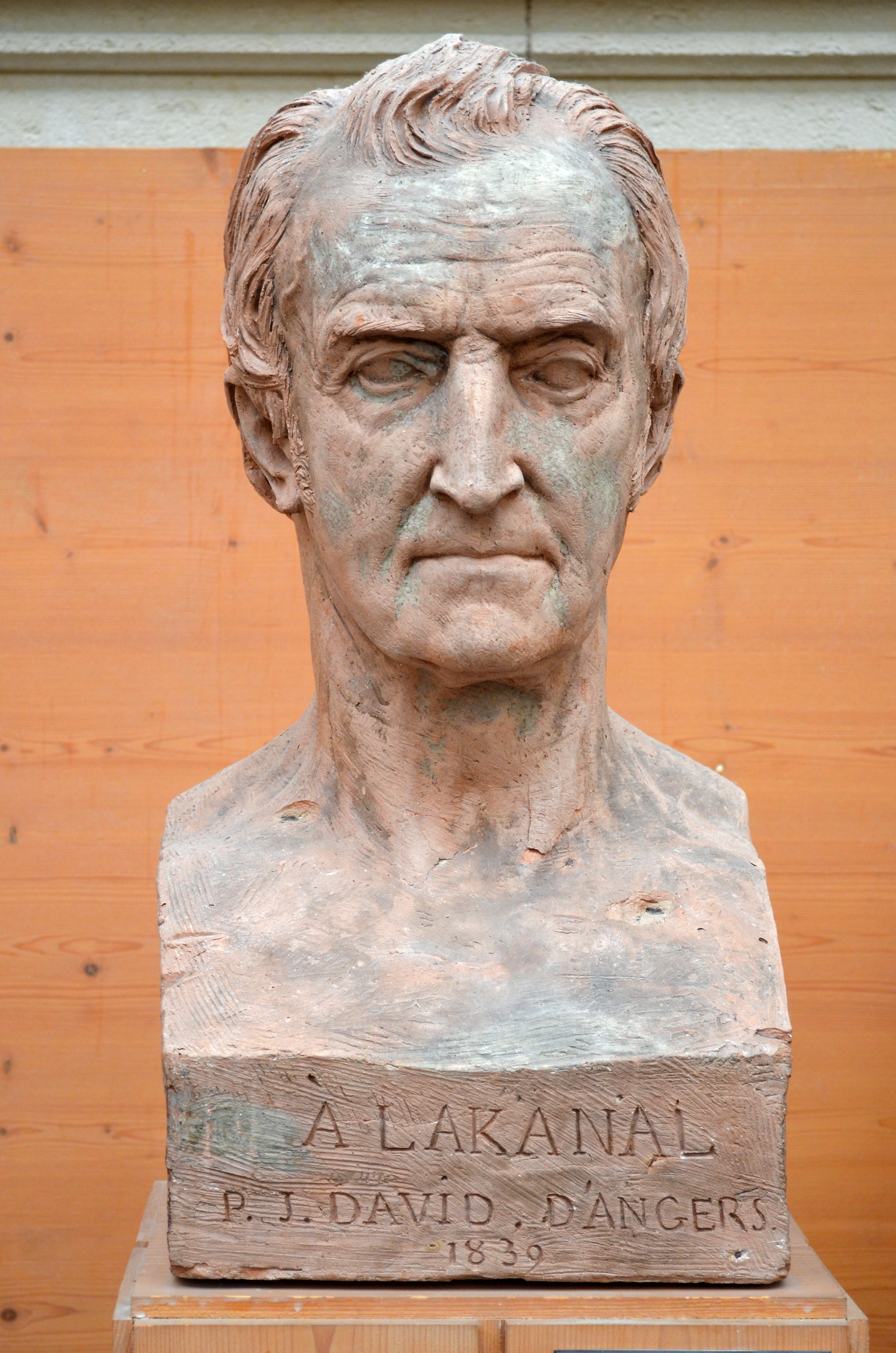
Bust of Lakanal by David d'Angers (1839).

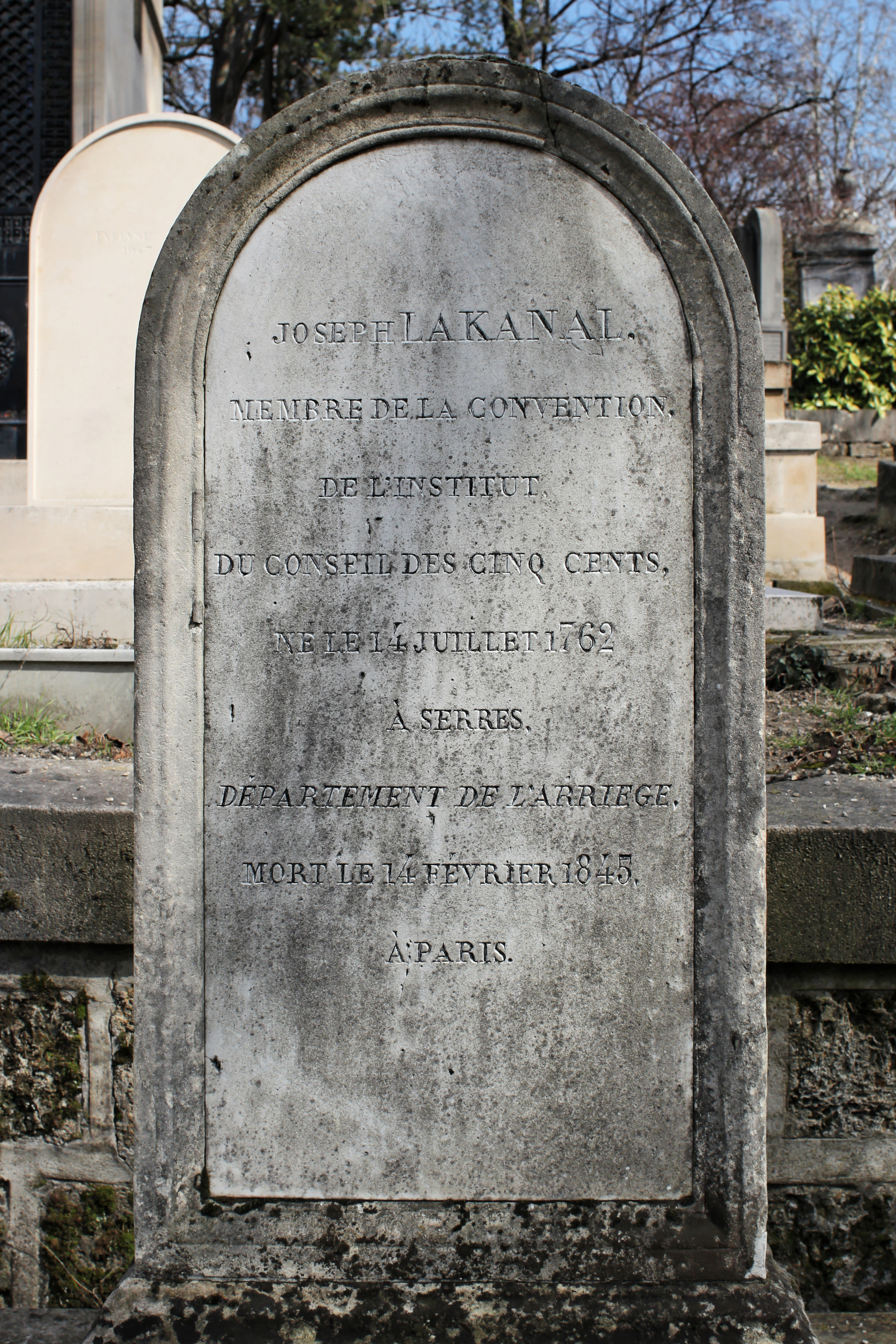
Grave of Lakanal, in Père Lachaise Cemetery, Paris.

Under the Consulate and Empire, Lakanal resumed his professional work, as a professor at the Lycée Charlemagne, and after the battle of Waterloo (1815), he retired to the United States. He was welcomed there by President James Madison, and the United States Congress gave him a grant of 500 acres (2.0 km^{2}) in the Vine and Olive Colony in Alabama. He then later became a planter, therefore owning slaves, and was afterward chosen president of the University of Louisiana that he reorganized with the support of local masonic lodges, known today as Tulane University.

He returned to France in 1834, and published in 1838 an Expos sommaire des travaux de Joseph Lakanal. Shortly afterwards, in spite of his advanced age, Lakanal married a second time. He died in Paris; his widow died in 1881. Lakanal's éloge at the Academy of Moral and Political Science, of which he was a member, was pronounced by the Comte de Rémusat (16 February 1845), and a Notice historique by François Mignet was read on 2 May 1857.

== Freemasonry ==
Probably initiated at a Moulins lodge between 1786 and 1788, Lakanal was member of "Le point parfait" lodge in Paris from 1790. After the Revolution, he created two High Degree Chapters "La Triple Harmonie" and "L'Abeille Impériale".

== Bibliography ==
- 1792 - Opinion du citoyen Lakanal, député du département de l'Arriège à la Convention nationale, sur la question de savoir, Si Louis XVI peut être jugé?. A Paris: De l'Imprimerie nationale
- 1793 - Décret sur le Jardin national des plantes, le cabinet d'histoire naturelle de Paris, du 10 juin 1793, l'an deuxième de la République. Précédé du rapport du citoyen Lakanal, député de l'Arriège à la Convention, membre du Comité d'instruction publique. Paris: De l'Imprimerie nationale
- 1793 - Projet de décret au nom des Comités d'instruction publique, de la guerre, des finances et de la marine. Sur la réunion du 10 août. Paris: De l'Imprimerie nationale
- 1794 - Rapport et projet de loi sur l'organisation des écoles primaires. Paris: De l'Imprimerie nationale
- 1794 - Rapport sur l'établissement des écoles normales. Paris: De l'Imprimerie nationale
- 1794 - Rapport. Sur J.J. Rousseau, fait au nom du Comité d'instruction publique, par Lakanal, dans la séance du 29 fructidor. Paris: De l'Imprimerie nationale
- 1794 - Lakanal a ses collègues. Paris: De l'Imprimerie nationale
- 1795 - Rapport sur les langues orientales, commerciales et diplomatiques. Fait au nom des Comités d'instruction publique et des finances. A Paris: De l'Imprimerie nationale
- 1796 - Rapport et projet de réglement de l'Institut national. A Paris: De l'Imprimerie nationale
- 1796 - Rapport fait au Conseil des cinq-cents. A Paris: De l'Imprimerie nationale
- 1838 - Exposé sommaire des travaux de Joseph Lakanal. Paris: Typographie de Firmin Didot frères
