= Revue d'histoire diplomatique =

- Discipline: History of diplomacy, international relations
- Language: French

Publication details
- History: 1887
- Publisher: Éditions A. Pedone (France)

Standard abbreviations
- ISO 4: Rev. Hist. Dipl.

Indexing
- ISSN: 0035-2365

Links
- Journal homepage

Revue d'histoire diplomatique (Journal of Diplomatic History) is a journal of the Société d'histoire diplomatique in France. It was established in 1887 and covers French and foreign diplomatic history and international relations.
