= Vermont Hatch Mansion =

Historic house in New York, United States

- U.S. National Register of Historic Places
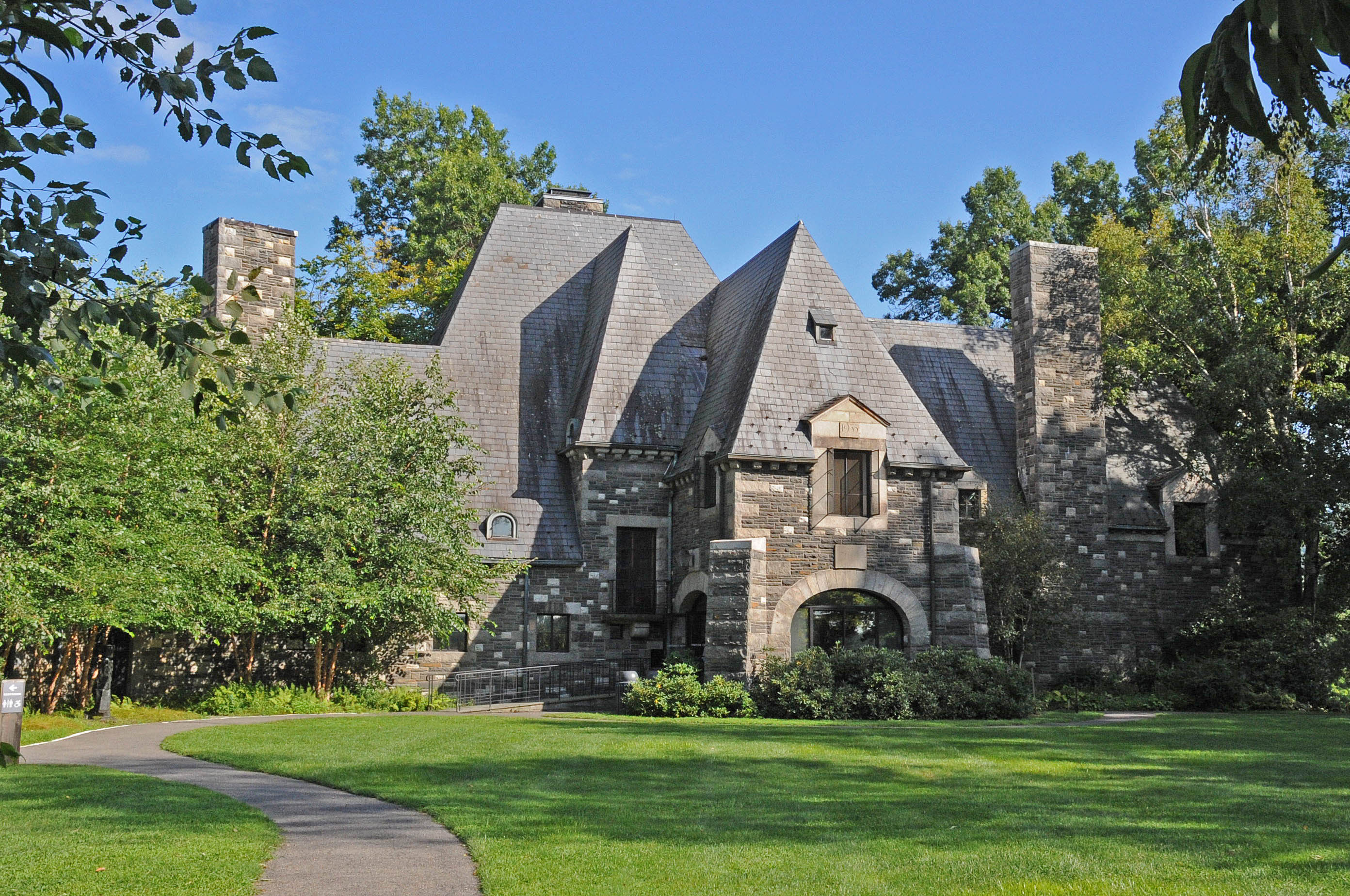

- Location within New York Location within the United States
- Location: Old Pleasant Hill Rd., Cornwall, New York
- Coordinates: 41°25′28″N 74°3′35″W
- Area: 2 acres (0.81 ha)
- Built: 1935
- Architect: Kimball, Maxwell
- Architectural style: Late 19th And 20th Century Revivals, French Chateau
- NRHP reference No.: 95000480
- Added to NRHP: May 2, 1995

Vermont Hatch Mansion is a historic home located at Cornwall in Orange County, New York. It was built in 1935 for Vermont Hatch and is a two-story, coursed ashlar stone dwelling in an eclectic French chateau style. It features a series of slate tiled hipped roofs. Also on the property is a gable roofed, stone garage.

It was listed on the National Register of Historic Places in 1995.

== See also ==
- Vermont Hatch
