= Arthur Chassériau =

French art collector

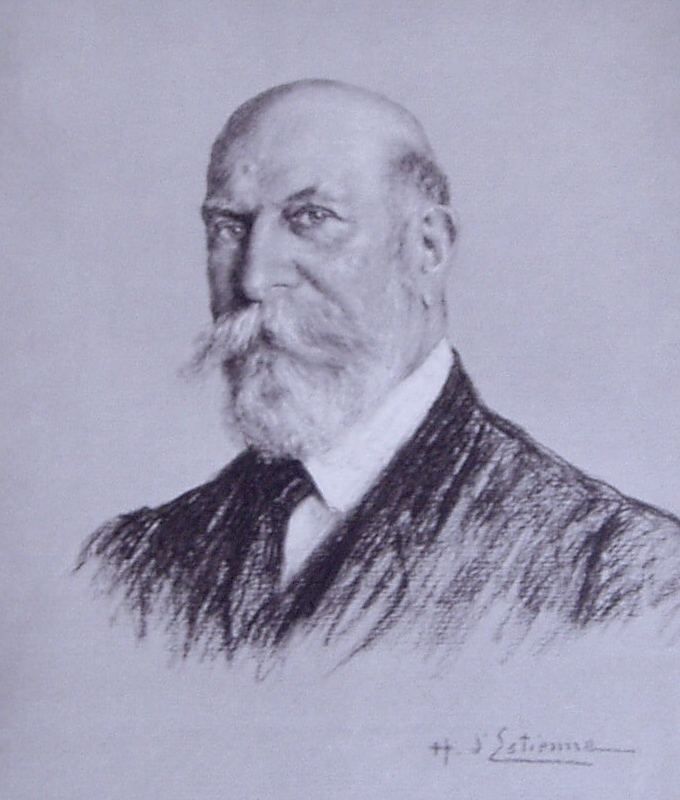
Baron Arthur Chassériau by Henri d'Estienne

Baron Arthur Nedjma Chassériau (1850, Algiers – 1934, Paris) was a French stockbroker, art lover and art collector, most notable as a major donor to the Musée du Louvre. He was the son of Charles Frédéric Chassériau, chief architect of Algiers, thus making him first cousin to the painter Théodore Chassériau - one of Arthur's donations to the Louvre was Aline Chassériau, Théodore's painting of his younger sister.

== Biography ==
A lover of art, the baron Arthur Chassériau was the son of the chief architect of Algiers, Charles Frédéric Chassériau, first cousin of the painter Théodore Chassériau.

Arthur Chassériau was born in Algiers in 1850. He began his studies in Paris at the lycée Louis-le-Grand under the watchful eye of Frédéric-Victor-Charles Chassériau, State Councillor (Conseiller d'État), elder brother of Théodore Chassériau. Back in Algiers, he joined the francs-tireurs and served in uniform in 1871, taking part in the suppression of the insurrection and the Kabylie campaign.

=== Head of financial services for the Compagnie universelle du canal interocéanique de Panama ===
Baron Chassériau was not an architect like his admired father, but pursued a career as a financier in Paris, where he settled permanently in 1875. At the Compagnie universelle du canal interocéanique de Panama, he soon won the esteem of Ferdinand de Lesseps, becoming one of his close collaborators as head of financial services (1881-1887).

=== Partner of stockbroker and banker of the Gotha ===
He resigned before the fall of Panama, and joined forces with Alfred Ott to found a banking and stockbroking firm. A few years later, he joined Alfred Ott as a partner in the Albert Leuba and Jean Saintoin firm of stockbrokers, which he did not leave until the end of his life. He managed the fortunes of a number of Gotha figures, including those of Queen Natalie of Serbia for 30 years and Princess de la Moskowa, née Princess Eugénie Bonaparte.

=== Patron and major donor to the Musée du Louvre ===
It was during almost daily visits to the artist's aging brother, Frédéric-Victor-Charles Chassériau, in his Place Vendôme apartment that the young Arthur Chassériau promised himself to honor the memory and work of the "cousin" Théodore he had never met.

For almost half a century, Baron Chassériau sought out Théodore's works around the world. No sacrifice or effort, no matter how great, slowed down his life's work.

From 1879 to 1898, Baron Chassériau and the Comité Chassériau fought to save the frescoes painted by Théodore Chassériau for the Cour des Comptes, which were destroyed by fire in the Palais d'Orsay.

Never one to refuse his help, Arthur Chassériau sat on the boards of numerous art foundations and remained a member of the board of the Société des Amis du Louvre for many years. From 1925 to 1934, he chaired the Board of Directors of the Rodin Museum. La Sabretache appointed him a life member of its Committee. He was also president of the Musée Gustave Moreau and founder of the Société des Peintres Orientalistes (1887).

As the main collector of Théodore Chassériau's work, he was the one in charge of certifying his nephew's original work. By the end of his life, Arthur Chassériau became almost blind, so it has been speculated that he may have certified works that were in fact not created by his nephew.

He was a knight of the Légion d'honneur and a recipient of the Médaille coloniale and the Médaille commémorative de la guerre 1870-1871.

== Bibliography ==
- Nouvion, J-Baptiste (2014). Chassériau : correspondance oubliée (in French). ed. Lac.
