= Elm Ridge Plantation =

Historic house in Alabama, United States

- Hatch House
- U.S. National Register of Historic Places
- Alabama Register of Landmarks and Heritage
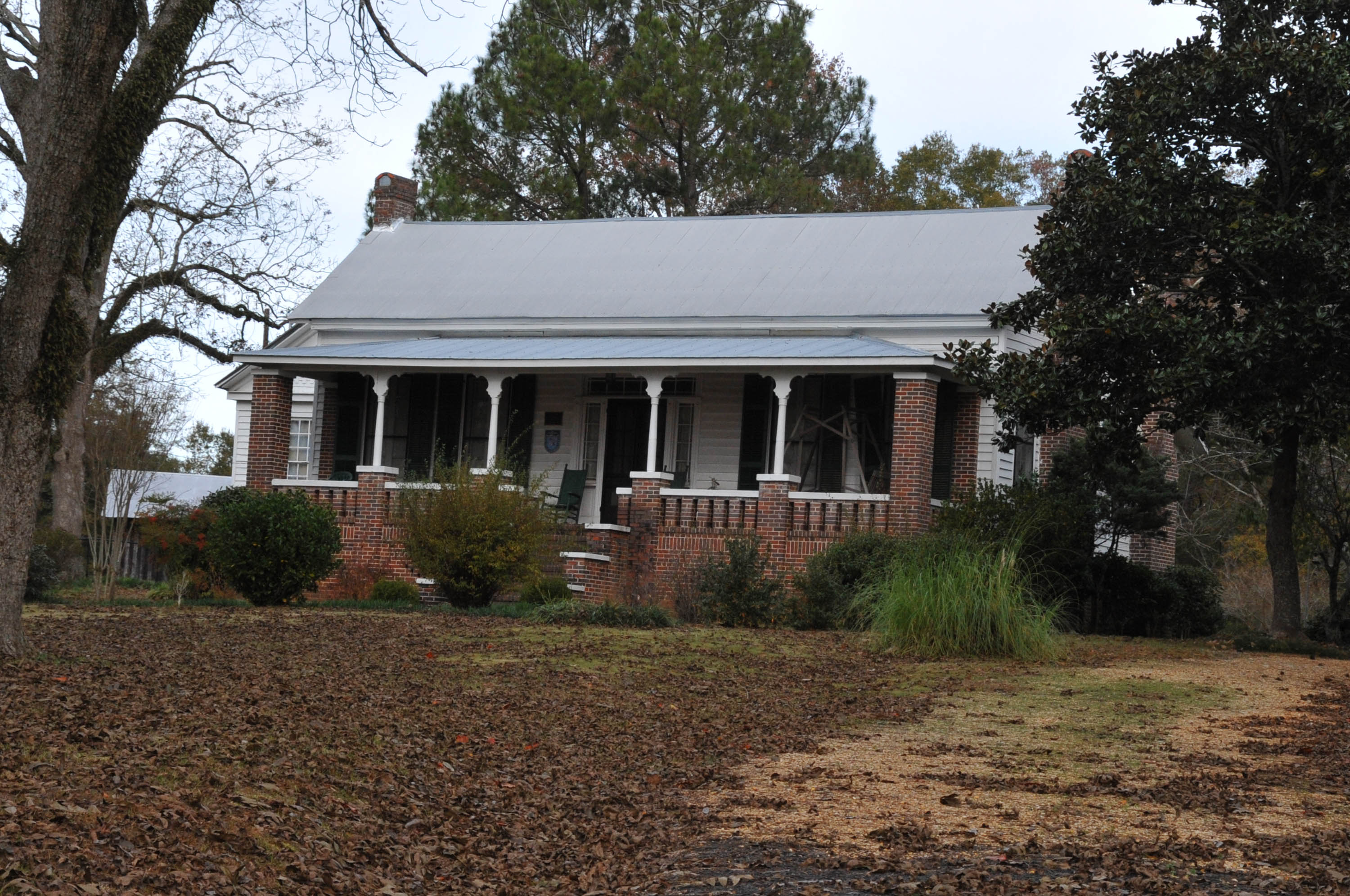
- The house in May 2008

- Location within Alabama Location within the United States
- Nearest city: Greensboro, Alabama
- Coordinates: 32°43′6″N 87°38′2″W
- Area: 35 acres (14 ha)
- Built: 1836
- Architectural style: Mid 19th Century Revival
- NRHP reference No.: 91001483

Significant dates
- Added to NRHP: October 11, 1991
- Designated ARLH: November 2, 1990

Elm Ridge Plantation, also known as the Hatch House and Holbrook House, is a historic forced-labor farm and plantation house in rural Hale County near Greensboro, Alabama, United States. The one-story raised cottage-style house was built about 1836. It was added to the Alabama Register of Landmarks and Heritage on November 2, 1990, and to the National Register of Historic Places on October 11, 1991, due to its architectural significance.

Its 35-acre (14 ha) property includes five contributing buildings and one other contributing structure.
