= Ashe Cottage =

Historic house in Alabama, United States

- U.S. National Register of Historic Places
- Alabama Register of Landmarks and Heritage
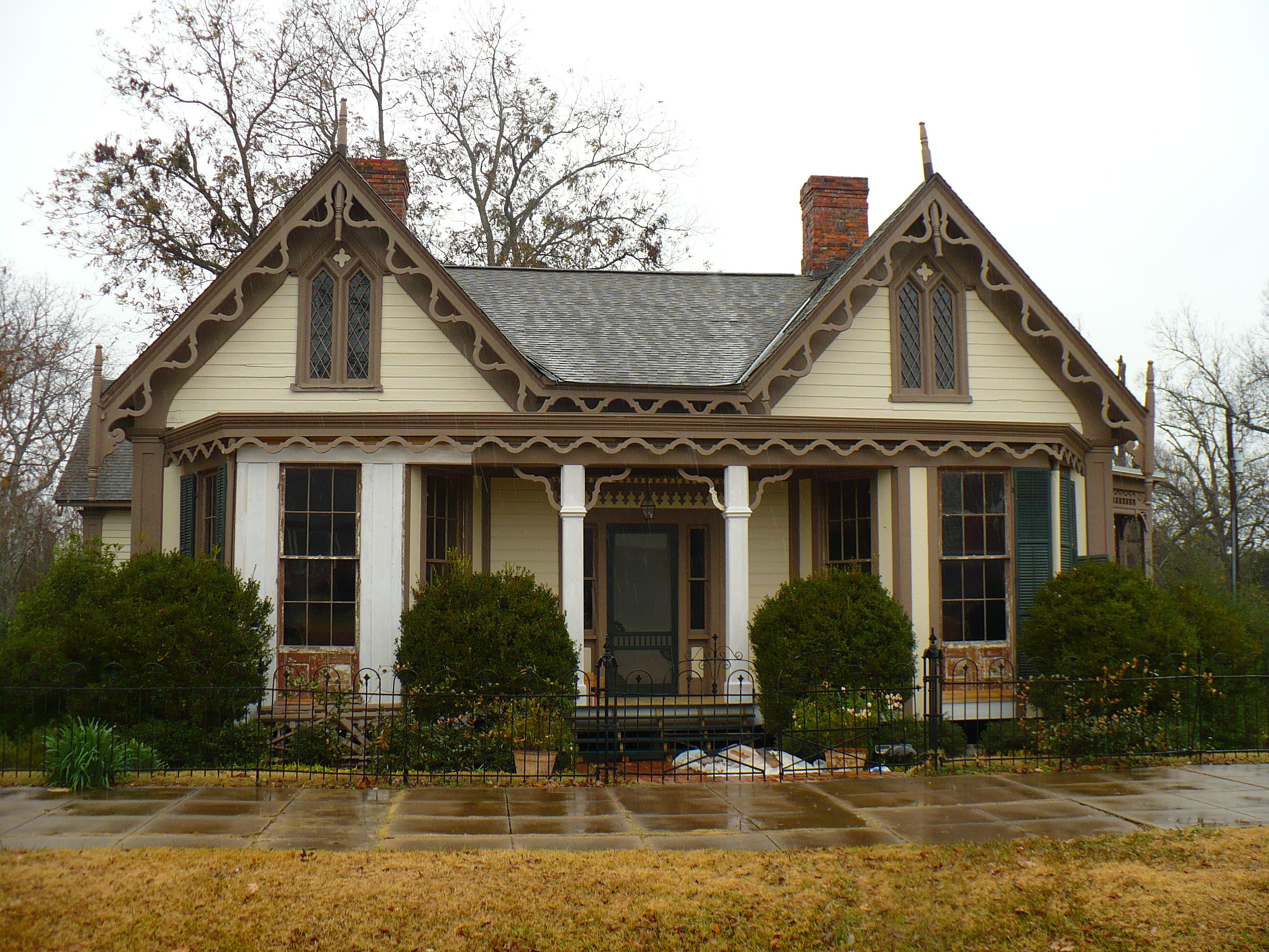
- Ashe Cottage, undergoing repainting in 2008

- Location within Alabama Location within the United States
- Location: 307 North Commissioners Avenue; Demopolis, Alabama
- Coordinates: 32°31′9.16″N 87°50′25.19″W
- Area: 1 acre (0.40 ha)
- Built: 1832; 1858
- Architect: Dr. William Cincinnatus Ashe
- Architectural style: Gothic Revival
- NRHP reference No.: 78000502

Significant dates
- Added to NRHP: 19 October 1978
- Designated ARLH: August 22, 1975

Ashe Cottage, also known as the Ely House, is a historic Carpenter Gothic house in Demopolis, Alabama. It was built in 1832 and expanded and remodeled in the Gothic Revival style in 1858 by William Cincinnatus Ashe, a physician from North Carolina. The cottage is a 1 1/2-story wood-frame building, the front elevation features two semi-octagonal gabled front bays with a one-story porch inset between them. The gables and porch are trimmed with bargeboards in a design taken from Samuel Sloan's plan for "An Old English Cottage" in his 1852 publication, The Model Architect. The house is one of only about twenty remaining residential examples of Gothic Revival architecture remaining in the state. Other historic Gothic Revival residences in the area include Waldwic in Gallion and Fairhope Plantation in Uniontown. Ashe Cottage was added to the Alabama Register of Landmarks and Heritage on August 22, 1975, and to the National Register of Historic Places on 19 October 1978.

The Ashe House is given as one of four examples of the paired-gable subtype of Gothic Revival houses in A Field Guide to American Houses (1984). It is noted as having "very delicate lace-like porches and vergeboard details." Paired gables appear in about five percent of Gothic Revival houses in America.
