= First Presbyterian Church (Uniontown, Alabama) =

Historic church in Alabama, United States

- U.S. Historic district – Contributing property
- Location within Alabama
- Location: Uniontown, Alabama
- Coordinates: 32°27′7″N 87°30′51″W
- Area: 1 acre (0.40 ha)
- Built: 1914
- Architectural style: Gothic
- Part of: Uniontown Historic District (Uniontown, Alabama) (ID00000137)
- Designated CP: February 24, 2000

First Presbyterian Church is a historic Presbyterian Church in America congregation in Uniontown, Alabama. The church was founded in 1848 as Hopewell Presbyterian Church. In 1853 the church merged with Coffee Spring Cumberland Presbyterian Church, which was also organized in 1848 and was meeting in a building three miles south of Uniontown. In 1854, the congregation moved into their first church building on Green Street. Services were held here for half a century until their current church was built on Water Avenue. The present building was dedicated in 1914. The window in the center of the north wall of the sanctuary is from the previous church. The pulpit chairs in the church are also from the church on Green Street. The First Presbyterian Church building is listed on the National Register of Historic Places (NRHP), added on February 24, 2000, as a contributing property to the Uniontown Historic District.

Source: History Of The First Presbyterian Church, 1848-1998, Sesquicentennial, Uniontown, Alabama, One Hundred Fiftieth Anniversary, Sunday, December 6, 1998, by Rev. Virgil Pino, Minister.
