= Fairhope Plantation =

Historic house in Alabama, United States

- U.S. National Register of Historic Places
- U.S. Historic district
- Alabama Register of Landmarks and Heritage
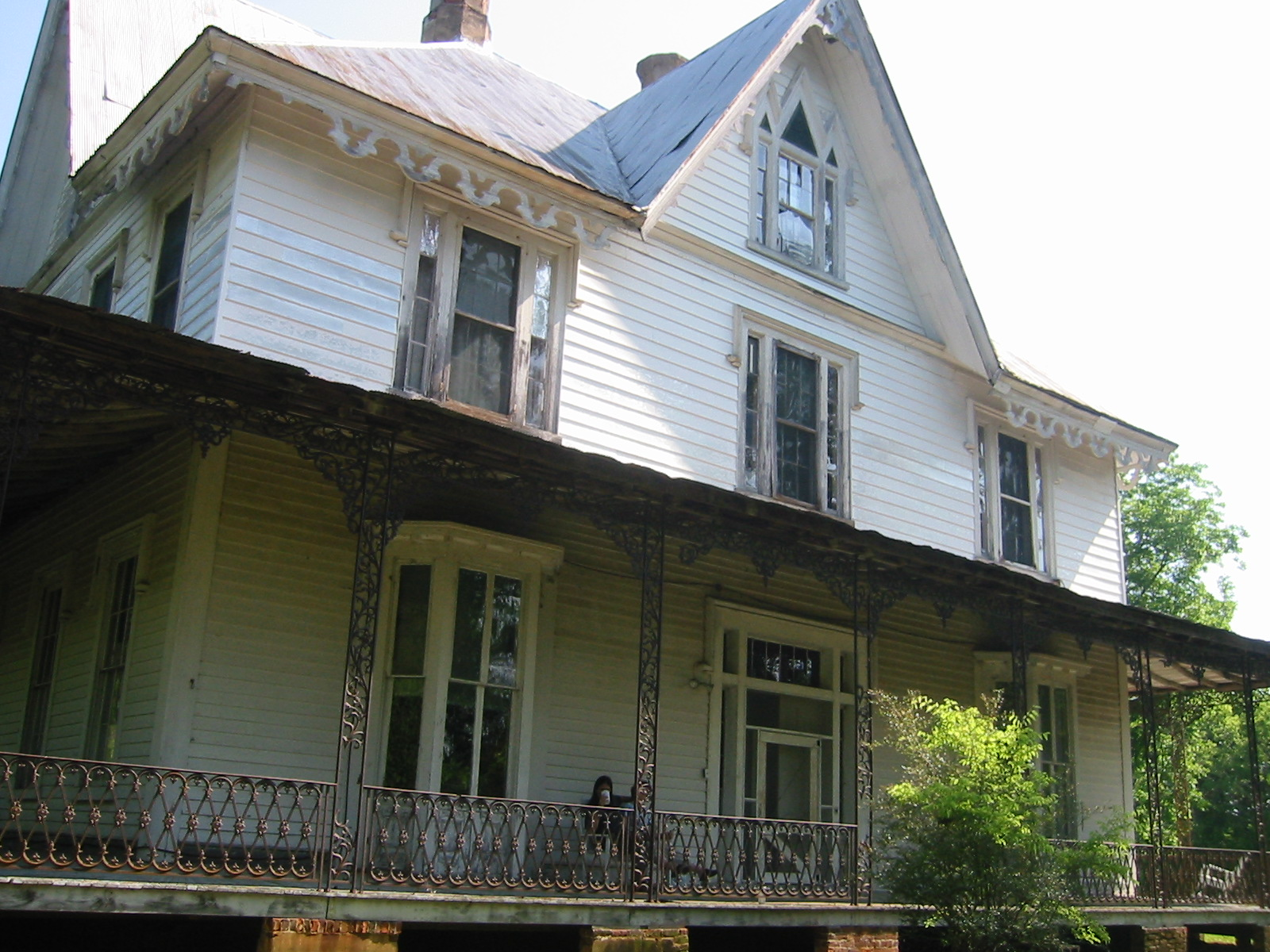
- The front (south) facade in 2005

- Location within Alabama Location within the United States
- Nearest city: Uniontown, Alabama
- Coordinates: 32°26′43″N 87°29′27″W
- Built: 1857
- Architect: Fowler, Theophilus G.
- Architectural style: Gothic Revival
- NRHP reference No.: 92000630

Significant dates
- Added to NRHP: May 29, 1992
- Designated ARLH: December 19, 1991

Fairhope Plantation is a historic Carpenter Gothic plantation house and historic district, located one mile east of Uniontown, Alabama, US. The 2 1/2-story wood-framed main house was built in the Gothic Revival style in the late 1850s. The plantation historic district includes six other contributing buildings, in addition to the main house. It was added to the Alabama Register of Landmarks and Heritage on December 19, 1991, and subsequently to the National Register of Historic Places on May 29, 1992, due to its architectural and historical significance.

== History ==
Fairhope Plantation was built for Joseph Selden, a native of Virginia. He was born on June 4, 1831, and grew up at Westover Plantation in Charles City County, Virginia. Selden married Elizabeth Collier Minge, of Weynoke Plantation, Virginia, near Faunsdale, in 1854. Elizabeth was born on May 30, 1833. Her family was also originally from Charles City County. Joseph and Elizabeth established Fairhope on property given to them by Elizabeth's family. The main house was built by Theophilus Gilliam Fowler, a local builder. Construction began in 1857 and was completed by 1861. The 1860 United States census of Perry County indicates that Joseph Selden owned 80 slaves in that year. Selden organized Selden's Battery, an artillery unit, at his own expense during the American Civil War. The unit saw action in several major engagements, including the battles of Kennesaw Mountain, Franklin and Nashville. Elizabeth Selden died following childbirth in 1868, Joseph died in a hotel fire in 1900. Fairhope continued to be owned by Selden descendants and operated as a farm for another century after their deaths.

== Architecture ==
The inspiration for the main house at Fairhope Plantation is thought by architectural historians to be an enlarged adaptation of a design by Alexander Jackson Davis, published in Andrew Jackson Downing's Cottage Residences in 1842. The house features numerous Gothic Revival details, including intricate bargeboards on the eaves and gables, hood moldings over the doors and windows, octagonal brick chimneys, and central gables topped by finials on all four sides. Additionally, it has a one-story cast-iron veranda around three sides of the ground floor. It is one of only about twenty Gothic Revival residential structures remaining in Alabama. Other historic Gothic Revival residences in the area include Waldwic in Gallion and Ashe Cottage in Demopolis.

Architecture of Fairhope
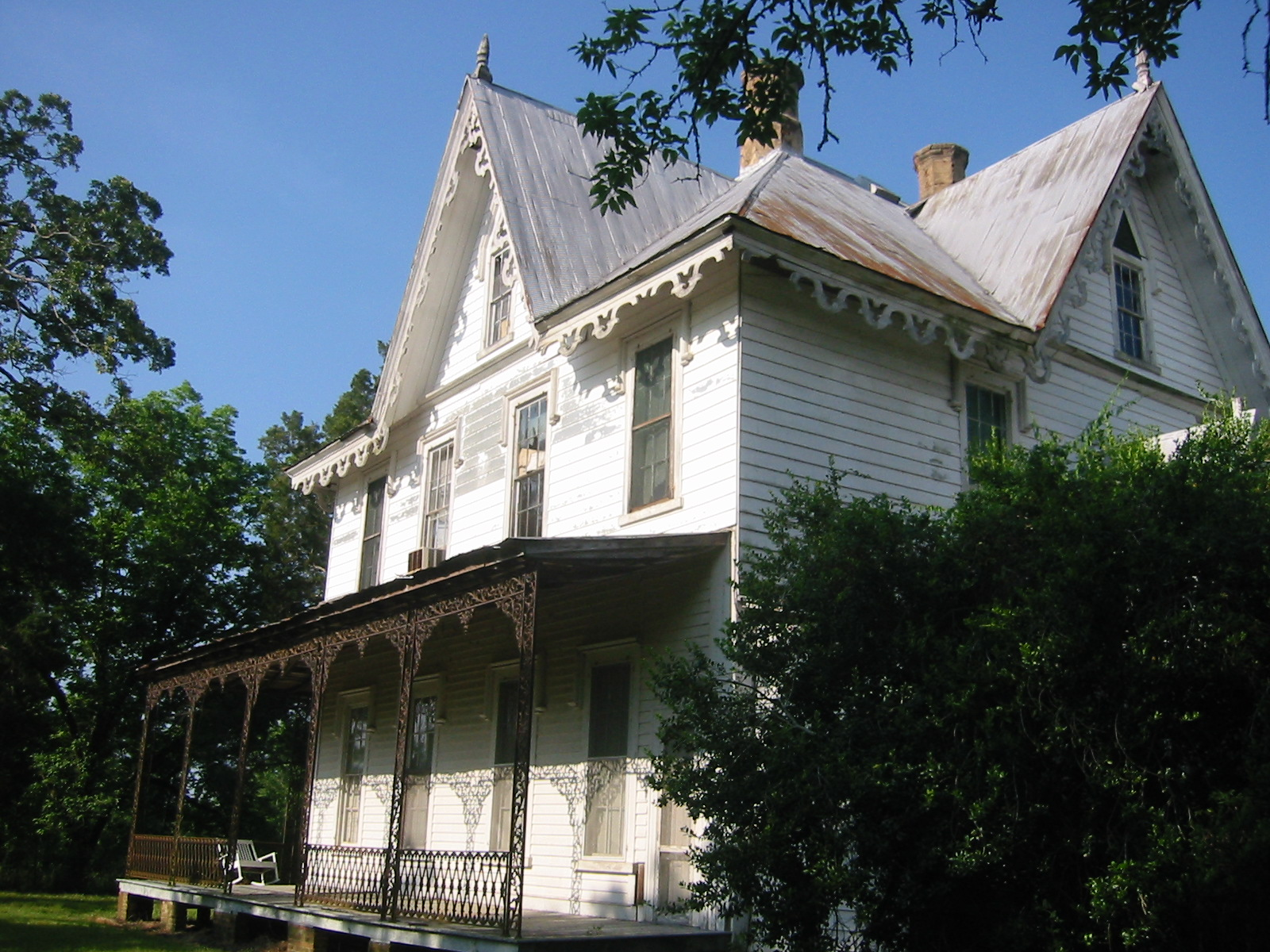
View of the east facade

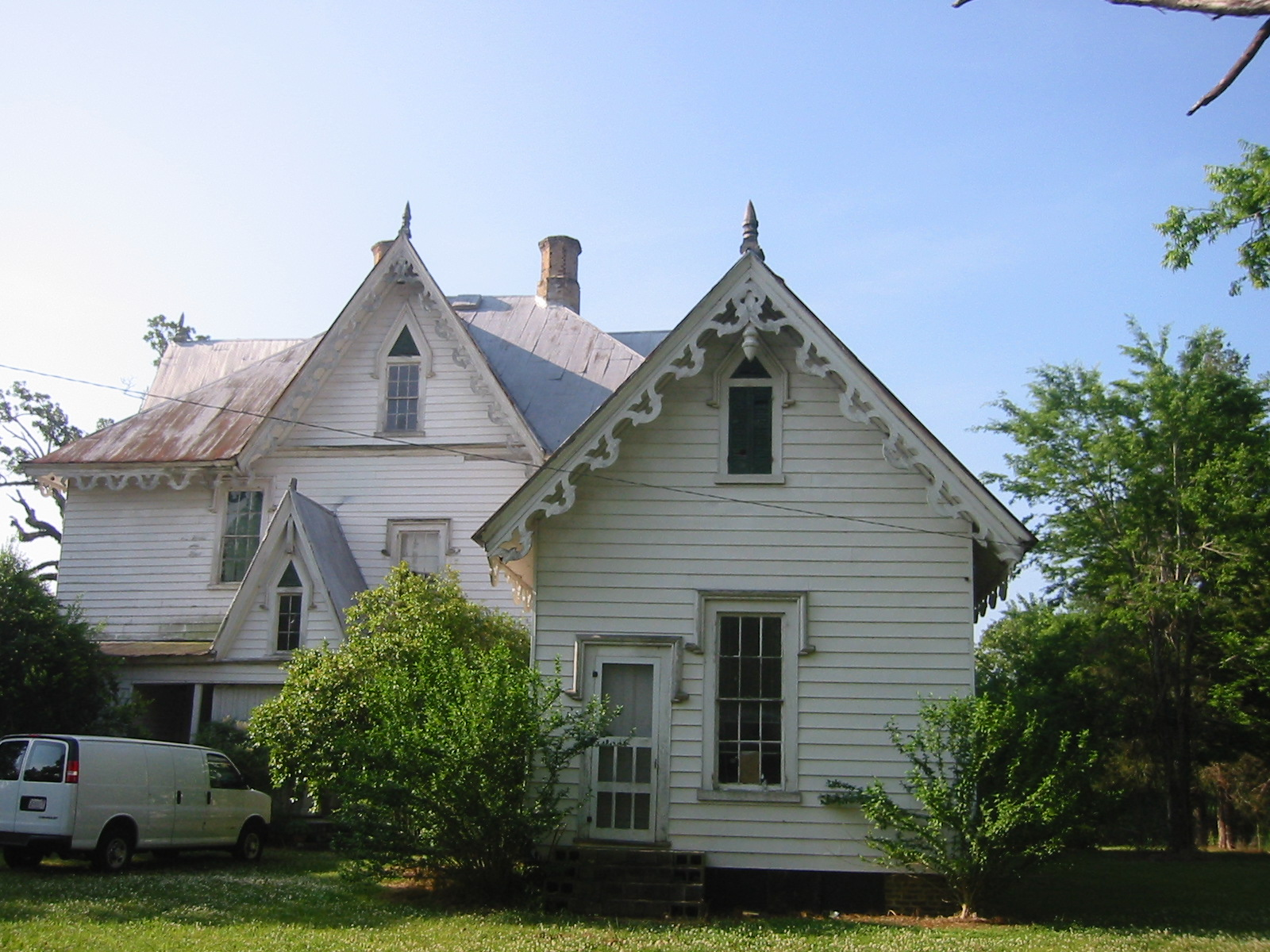
View of the rear (north) facade

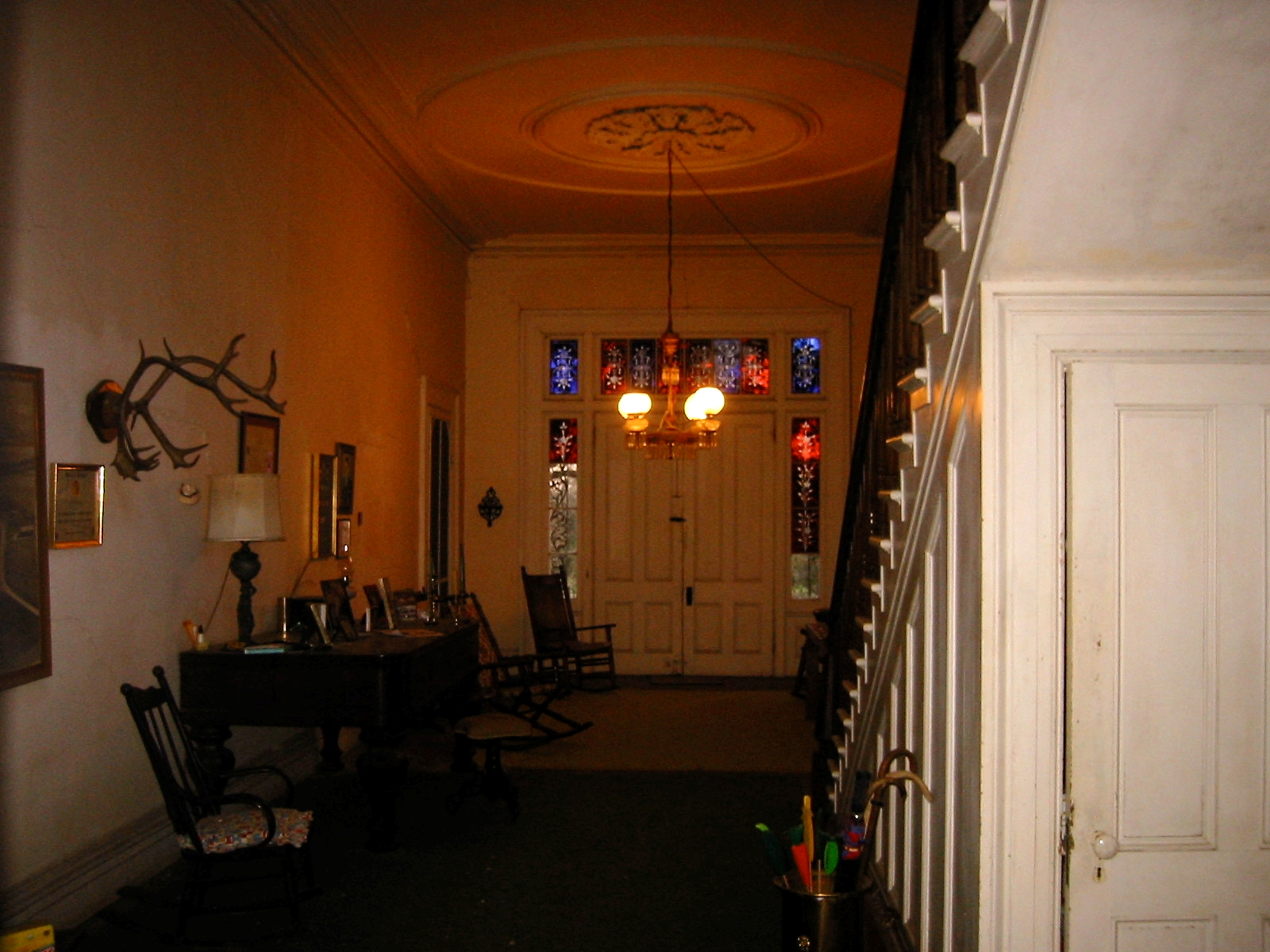
View of the front entrance hall

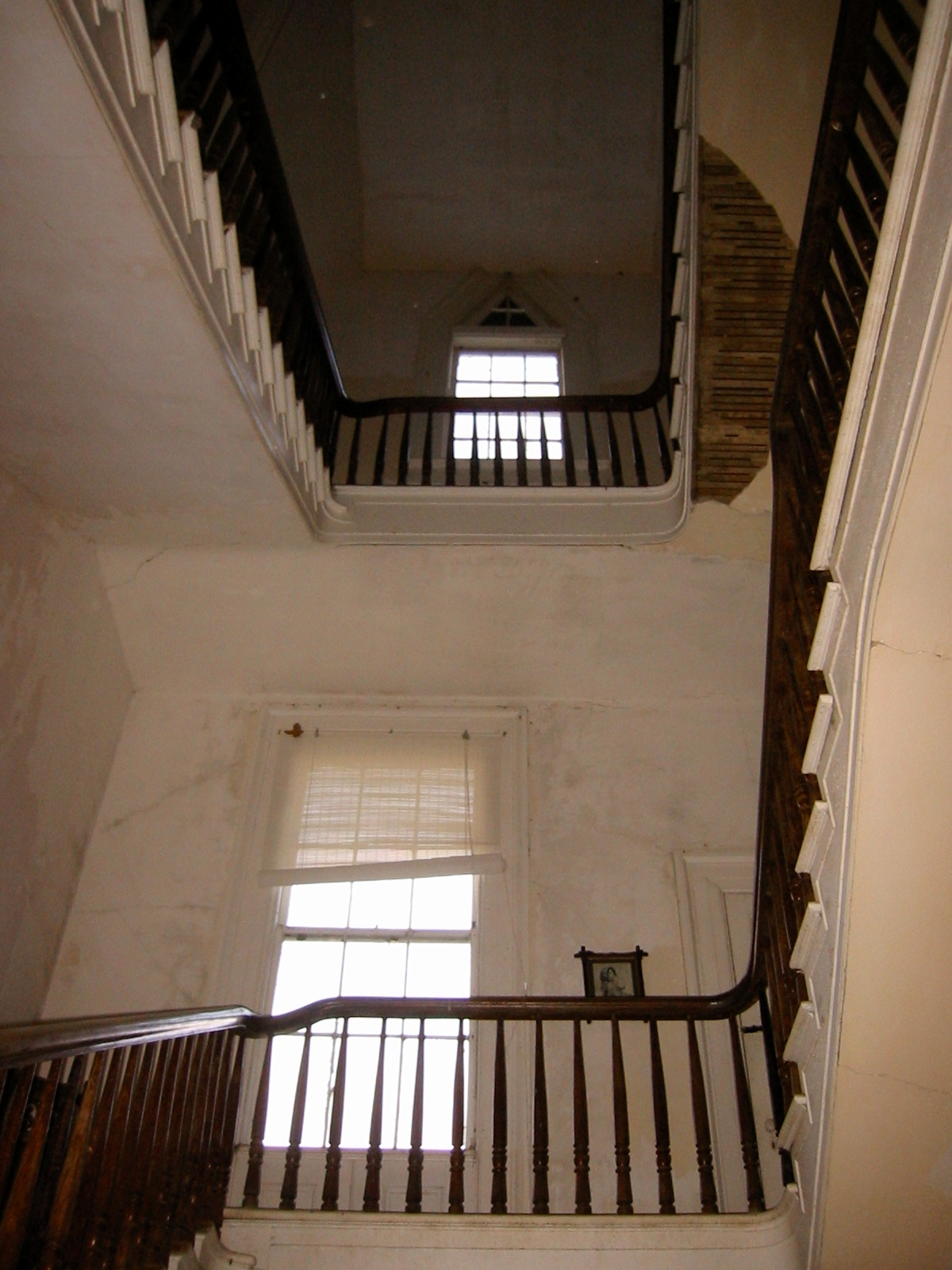
View of the stairwell upper landings
