= Waldwic =

Historic house in Alabama, United States

- U.S. National Register of Historic Places
- U.S. Historic district
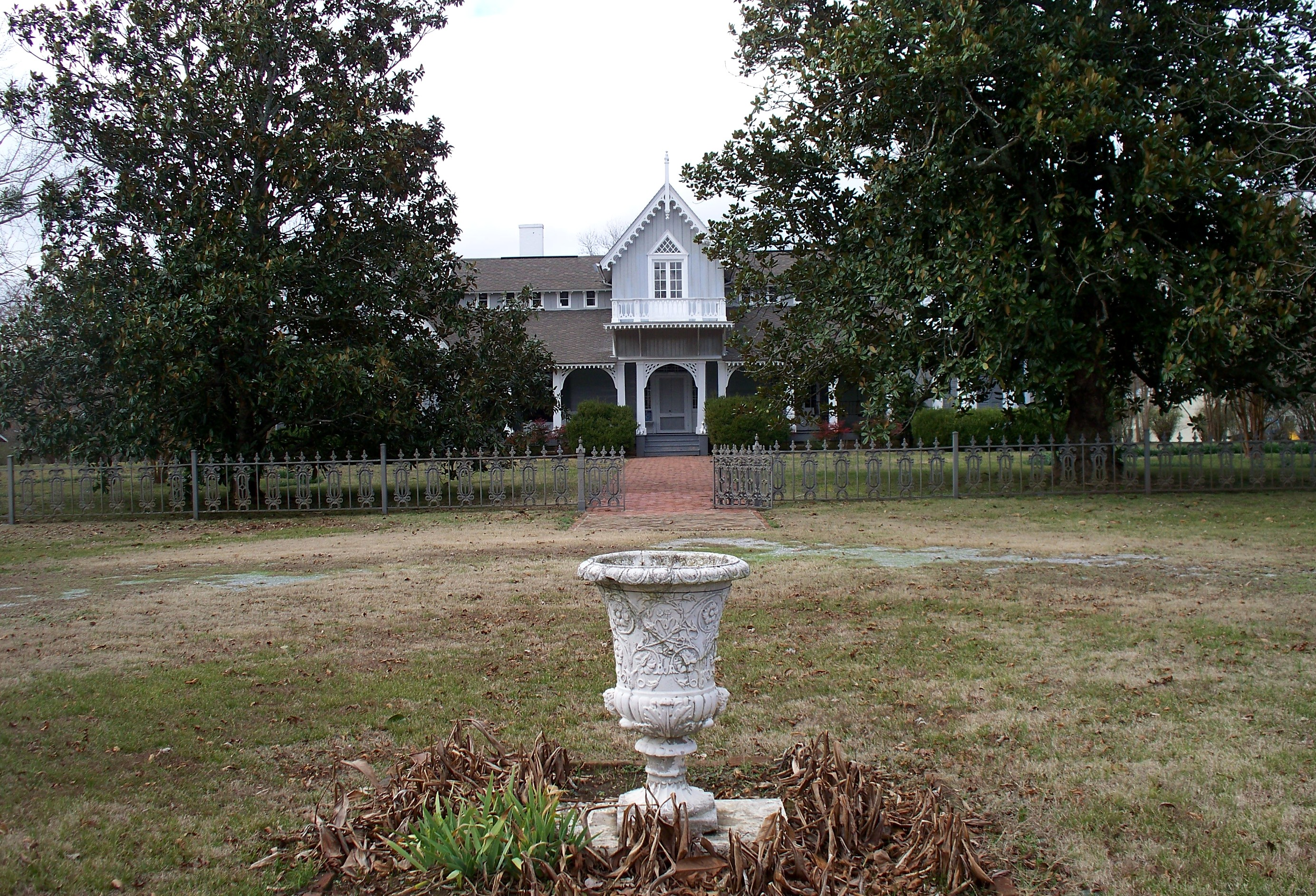
- Front elevation in 2008

- Location within Alabama Location within the United States
- Location: Gallion, Alabama
- Coordinates: 32°29′4.99″N 87°42′49.64″W
- Built: 1840, renovated 1852.
- MPS: Plantation Houses of the Alabama Canebrake and Their Associated Outbuildings Multiple Property Submission
- NRHP reference No.: 94000684
- Added to NRHP: July 22, 1994

Waldwic is a historic Carpenter Gothic plantation house and historic district located on the west side of Alabama Highway 69, south of Gallion, Alabama, United States. Built as the main residence and headquarters of a forced-labor farm worked by enslaved people, Waldwic is included in the Plantation Houses of the Alabama Canebrake and Their Associated Outbuildings Multiple Property Submission. The main house and plantation outbuildings were added to the National Register of Historic Places on July 22, 1994.

== History ==
The house for Robert Gracey started in 1840 as "an unpretentious galleried farmhouse" and was then expanded and renovated in the Gothic Revival style in 1852. The facade then resembled a rendering of “Waldwic Cottage” from volume two of William H. Ranlett’s "The Architect: A series of original designs for domestic and ornamental cottages and villas (1851)." Ranlett could have been involved with the design of the renovation as he was retained by other wealthy southerners, but just as likely is that Ranlett's design inspired the house and name (to which a “k” was eventually added). The carpentry work was completed by Peter Lee and Joe Glasgow, skilled craftsmen enslaved by Captain H.A. Tayloe, who owned the neighboring Macon Station Plantation. Lee and Glasgow also built St. Andrew's Episcopal Church (Prairieville, Alabama) (1853–1854) in the Carpenter Gothic style and the decorative interior woodwork. Gracey's widow remarried after Robert's death to Willis Bocock in 1856. The 1860 United States census of Marengo County indicates that Bocock enslaved 127 people in that year and the 1870s map of Hale County lists him as the owner still. The Waldwic property was originally within Marengo County, but this portion of Marengo was added to Hale County upon its creation in 1867. Robert Gracey's granddaughter, Bertha Gracey Steele, married at Waldwic in 1889 to William Micajah Spencer. He was a lawyer and was elected to the Alabama Senate in 1901. The house is one of only about 20 Gothic Revival residential structures remaining in Alabama. Other historic Gothic Revival residences in the area include Ashe Cottage in Demopolis and Fairhope Plantation in Uniontown.

Gallery
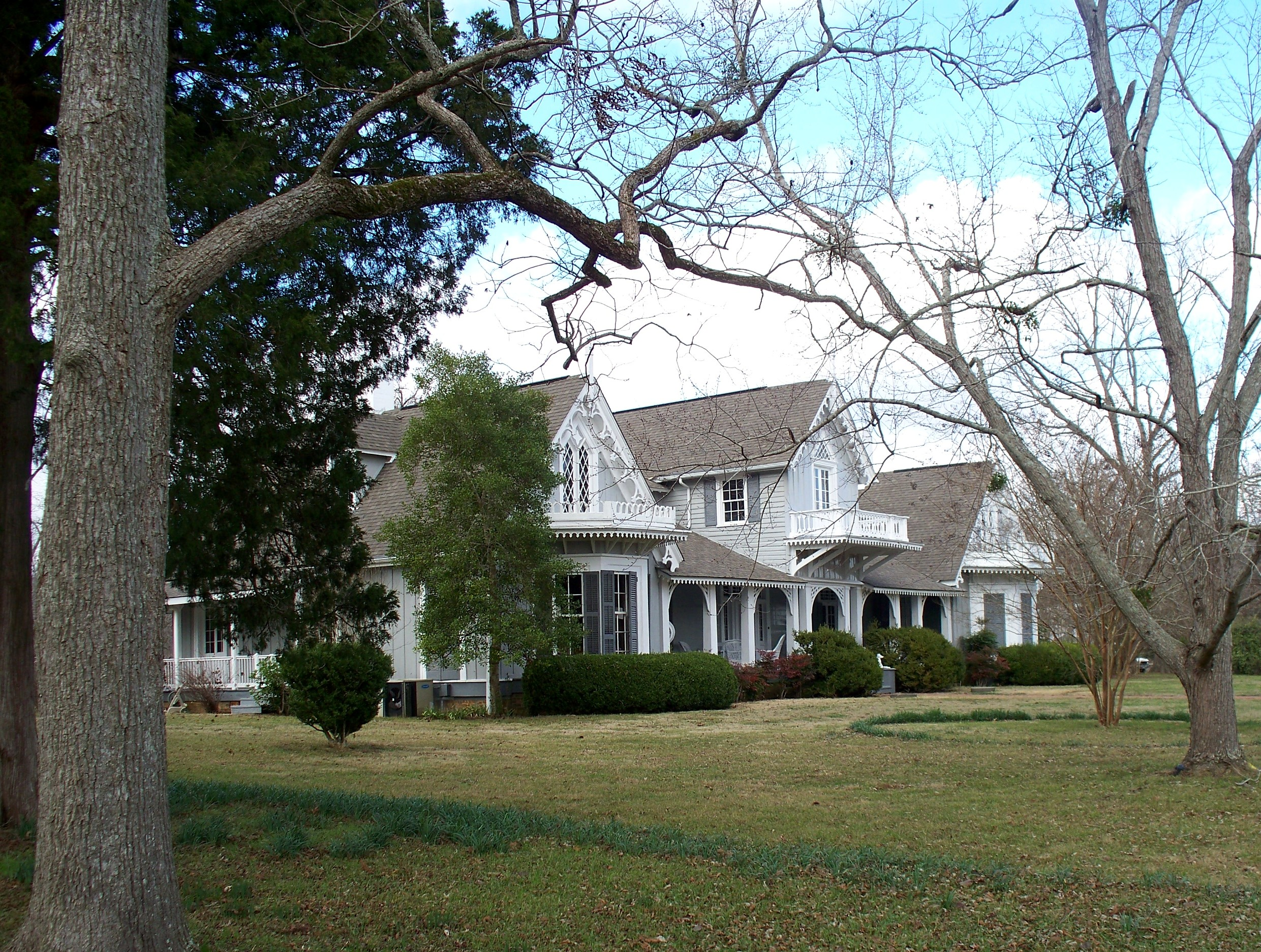
Front and side elevation in 2008

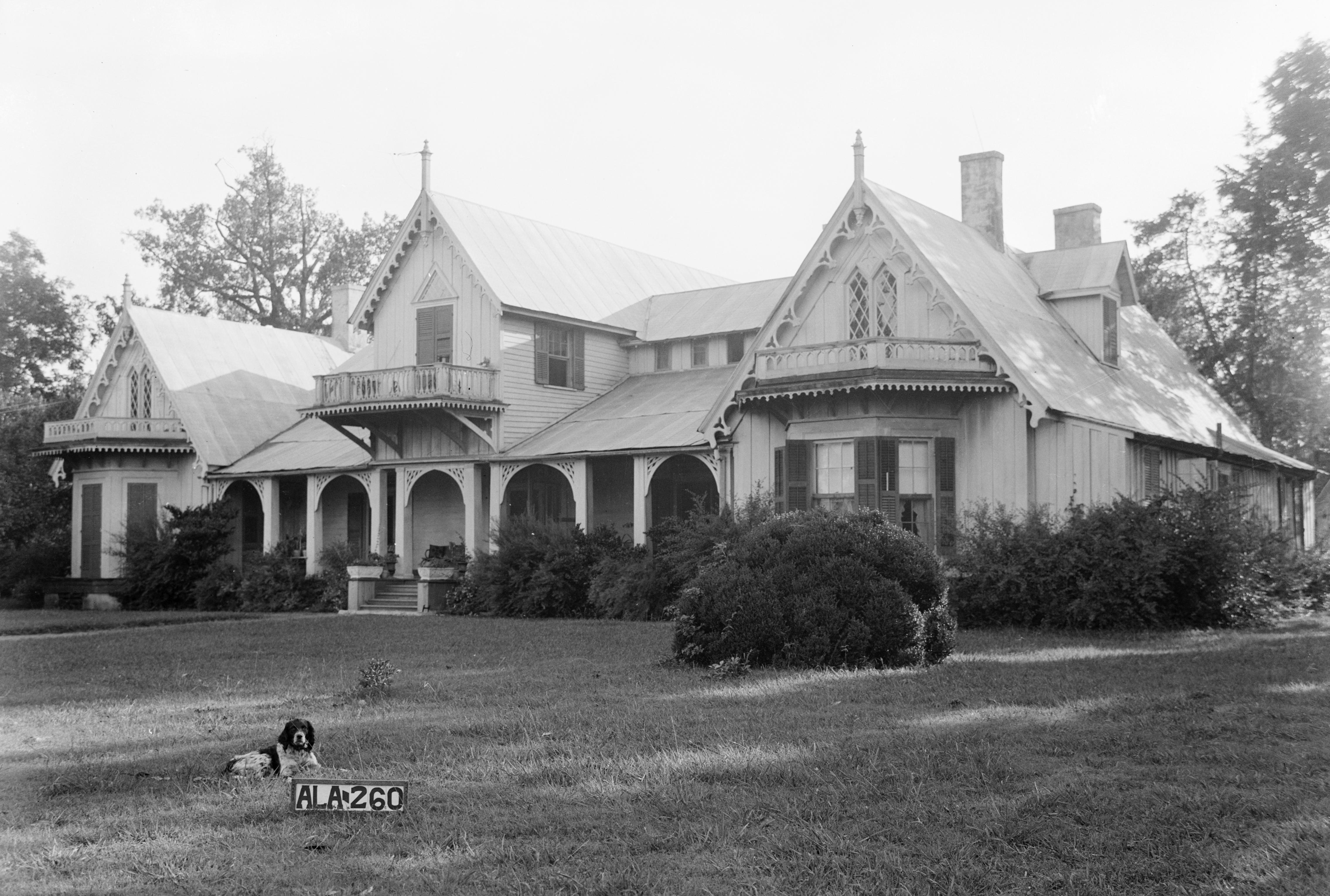
HABS photo of the main house at Waldwic, taken in 1935

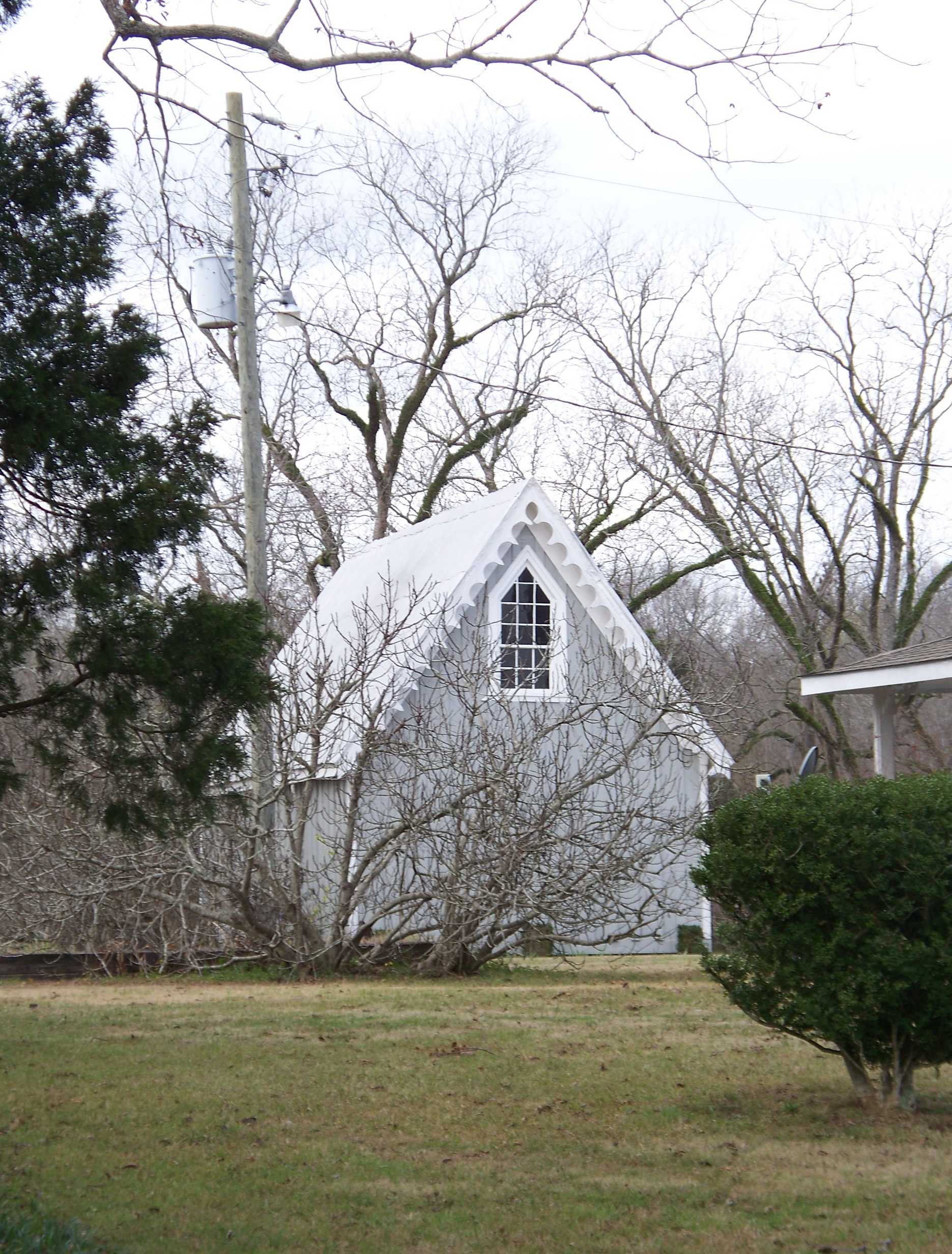
Servant's quarters in 2008

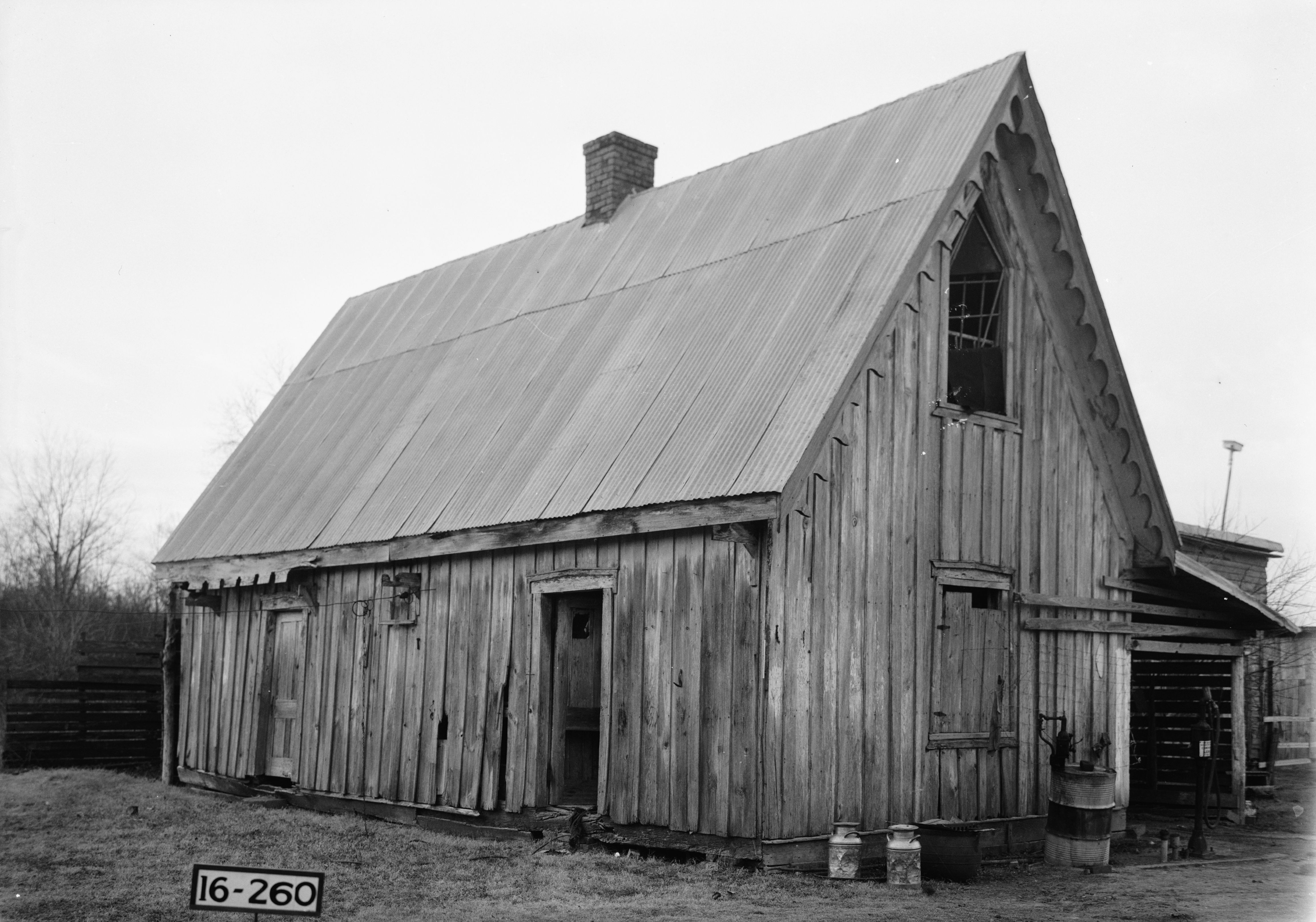
The same servant's quarters in 1935

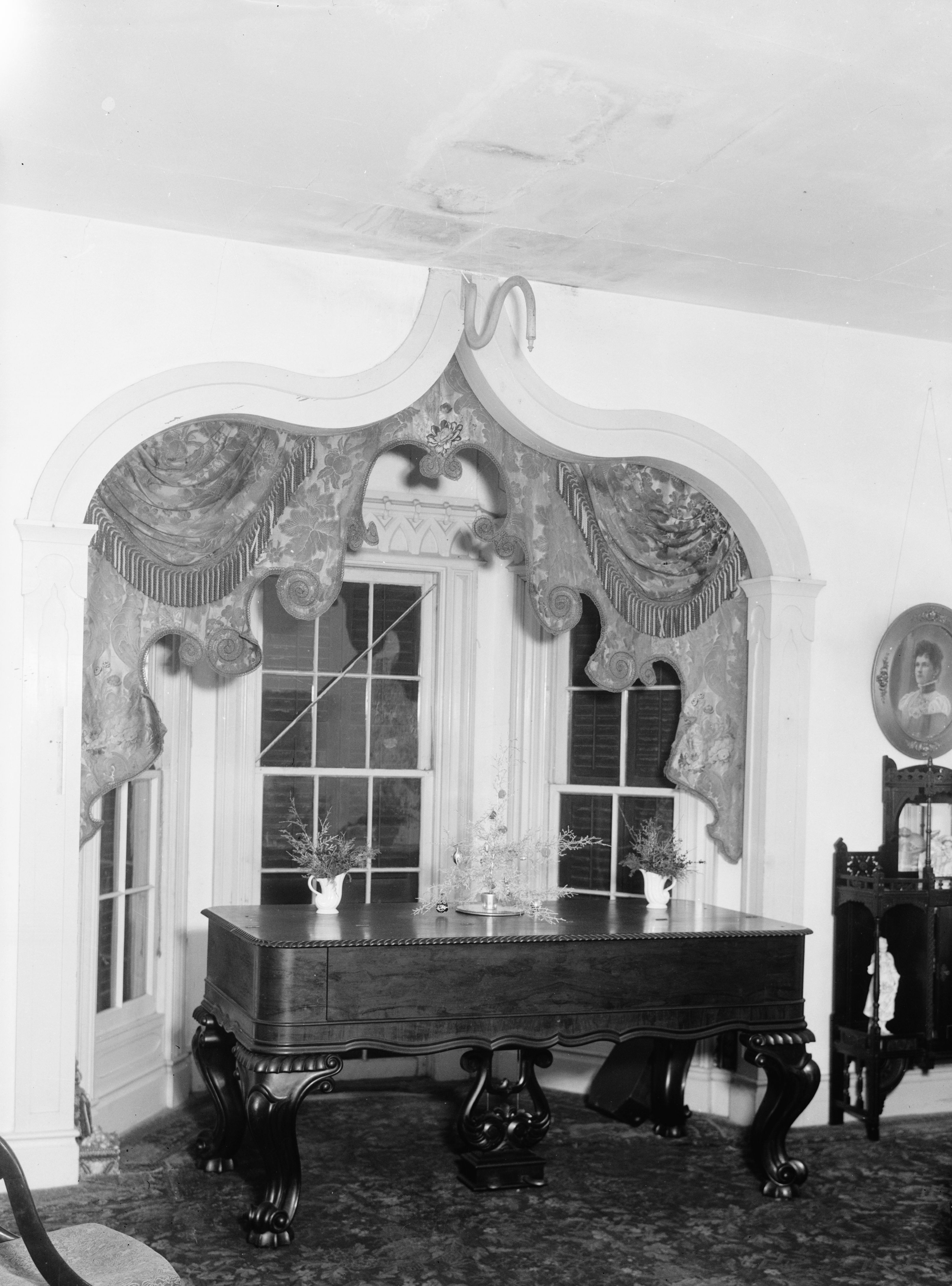
Parlor windows in 1935

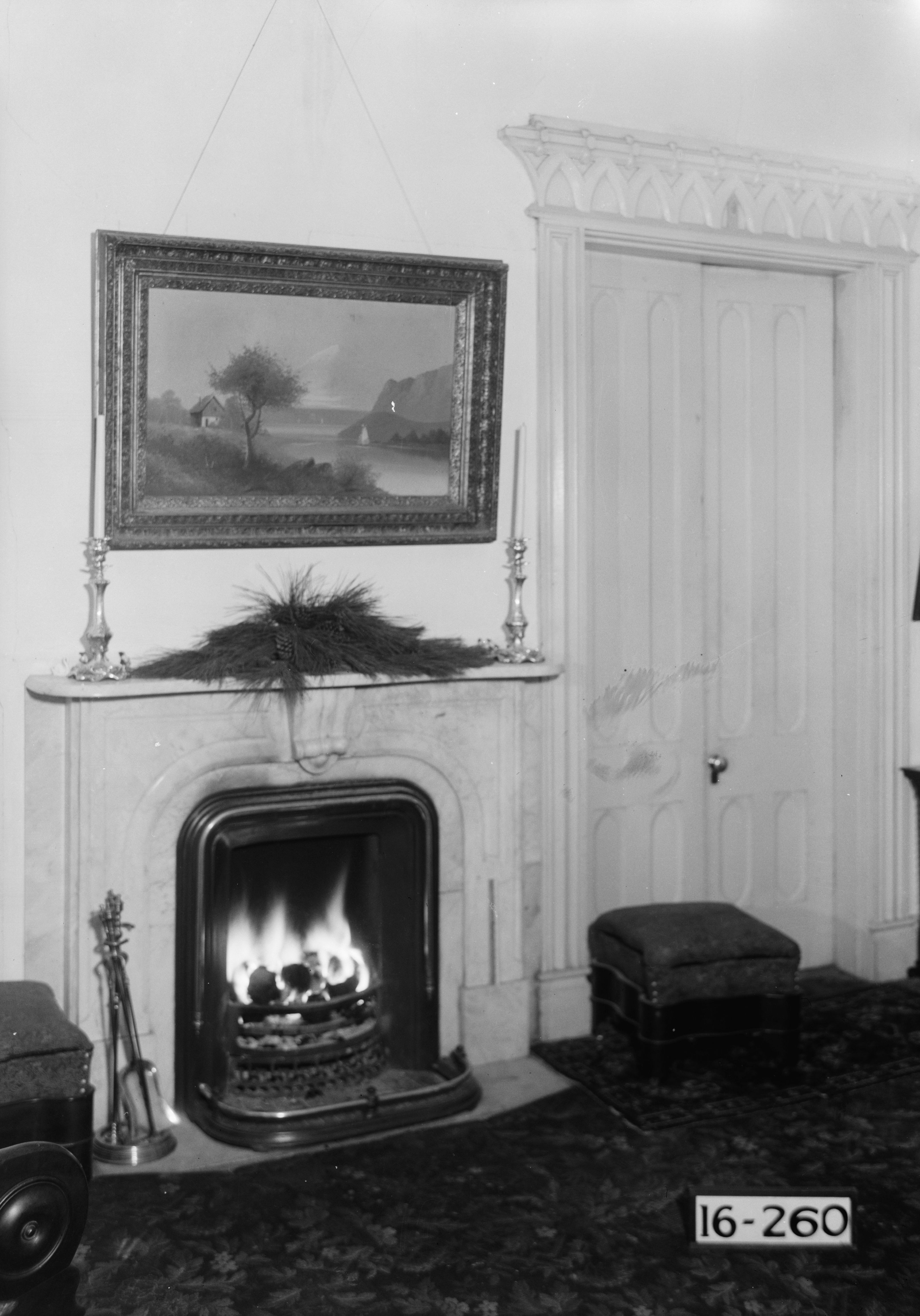
Parlor fireplace in 1935

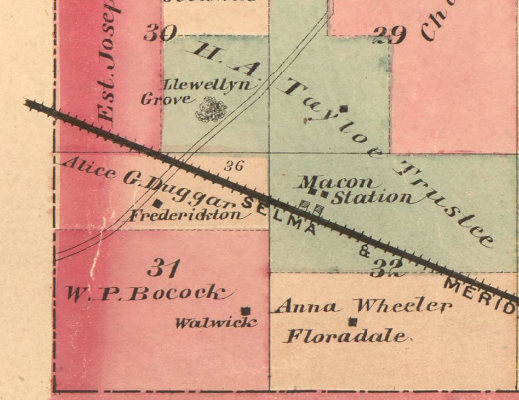
