= Uniontown Historic District =

Uniontown Historic District may refer to:

- Uniontown Historic District (Uniontown, Alabama)
- Uniontown Historic District (Uniontown, Maryland)
