= Pitts' Folly =

Historic house in Alabama, United States

- U.S. National Register of Historic Places
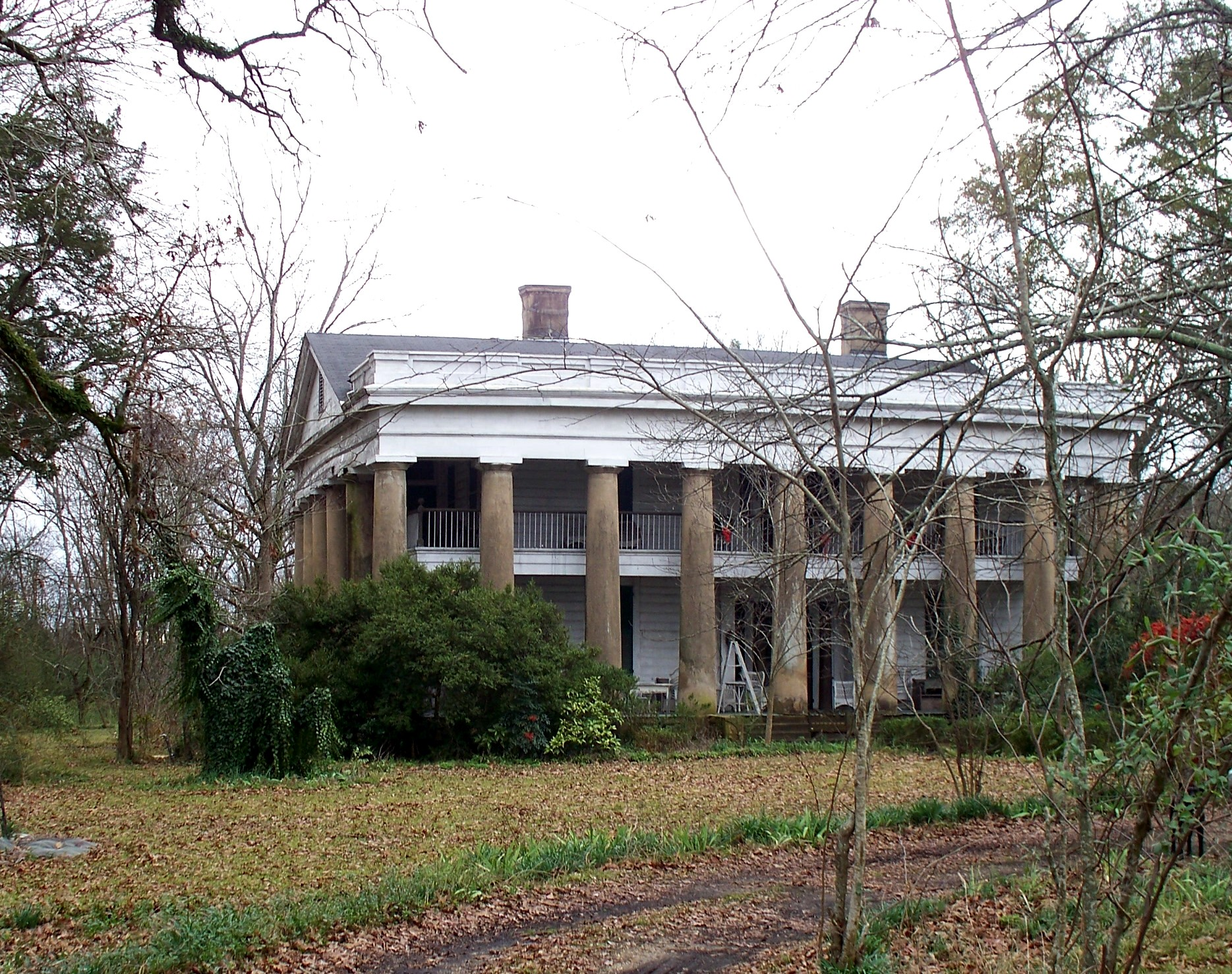
- The front elevation of Pitts' Folly in 2008

- Location within Alabama Location within the United States
- Location: Old Cahaba Rd., Uniontown, Alabama
- Coordinates: 32°26′42.22″N 87°30′29.88″W
- Area: 9.6 acres (3.9 ha)
- Built: 1852-53
- Architect: B. F. Parsons
- Architectural style: Greek Revival
- NRHP reference No.: 84000717
- Added to NRHP: August 9, 1984

Pitts' Folly is a historic antebellum Greek Revival residence located in Uniontown, Alabama. The house was built by Philip Henry Pitts as his main house. It was designed by architect B. F. Parsons, who also designed the nearby Perry County Courthouse in Marion. Many local legends detail how the house gained its name, but they all center on the people of Uniontown believing it to be folly, or foolishness, that Pitts was building such a large house.

== History ==
Phillip Henry Pitts was born June 3, 1814, in Essex County, Virginia. He was the son of Thomas Daniel Pitts, a veteran of the War of 1812 who moved his family to Uniontown in 1833. Pitts married in 1841 to Margaret Davidson, the sister of Alexander C. Davidson. The Davidsons were descendants of William Lee Davidson, a general during the American Revolutionary War and founder of Davidson College in North Carolina. Pitts himself was a large contributor to the college within his lifetime and his plantation diaries were later donated to it for preservation. Phillip Pitts recorded in his diary that construction of the house began on February 27, 1852. He also recorded the house being completed in April 1853. His assets by 1860 were valued at $175,300. At this time he owned two additional plantations, "Rurill Hill" and "Kings" for a total of 2,200 acres (890 ha). The 1860 United States census of Perry County indicates that Phillip Henry Pitts owned 75 slaves in that year, though his children are individually listed as owning an additional 68 slaves. Pitts also owned stock in the Alabama-Mississippi Railroad. The Pitts had ten children, most of whom were raised in the house, with two dying in the American Civil War. Phillip Pitts remained a cotton planter until his death on April 22, 1884. The house continues to be occupied by the descendants of Phillip Pitts to the present day.

== Architecture ==
Pitts' Folly is a two-story wood-frame structure with wooden clapboarding. The roof is gabled on the east and west sides, with a flat roof over the portico. The front and eastern elevations feature a two-story portico with fourteen masonry Doric columns, nine across the front and five on the east side. A cantilevered second floor balcony wraps both sides of the house under the portico. The interior is divided on both floors by a central hallway. Several rooms feature decorative plasterwork. The house and grounds were surveyed in 1935 and 1936 by the Historic American Buildings Survey. It was added to the National Register of Historic Places in 1984.

== Gallery ==
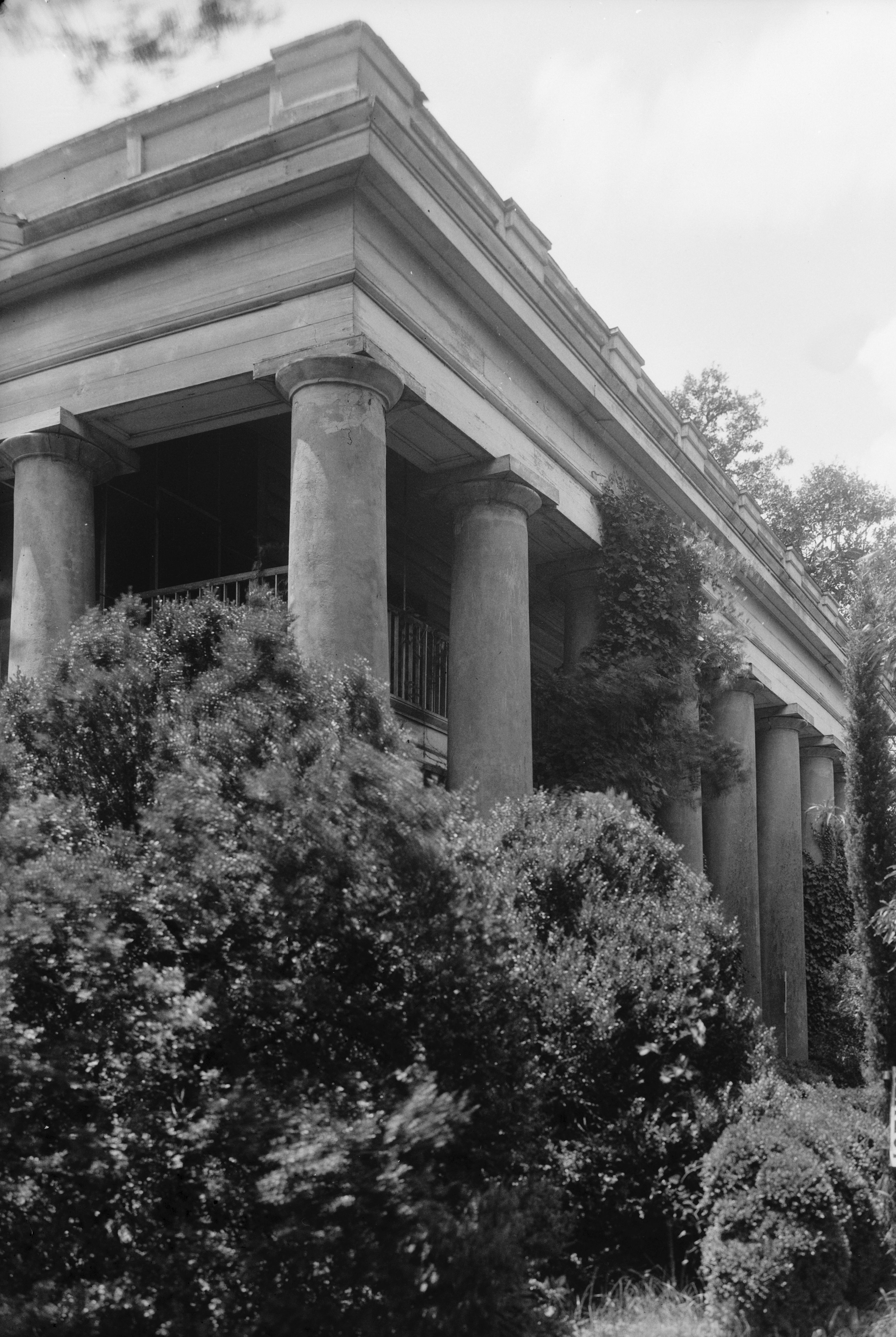
HABS photograph of the front elevation in 1936

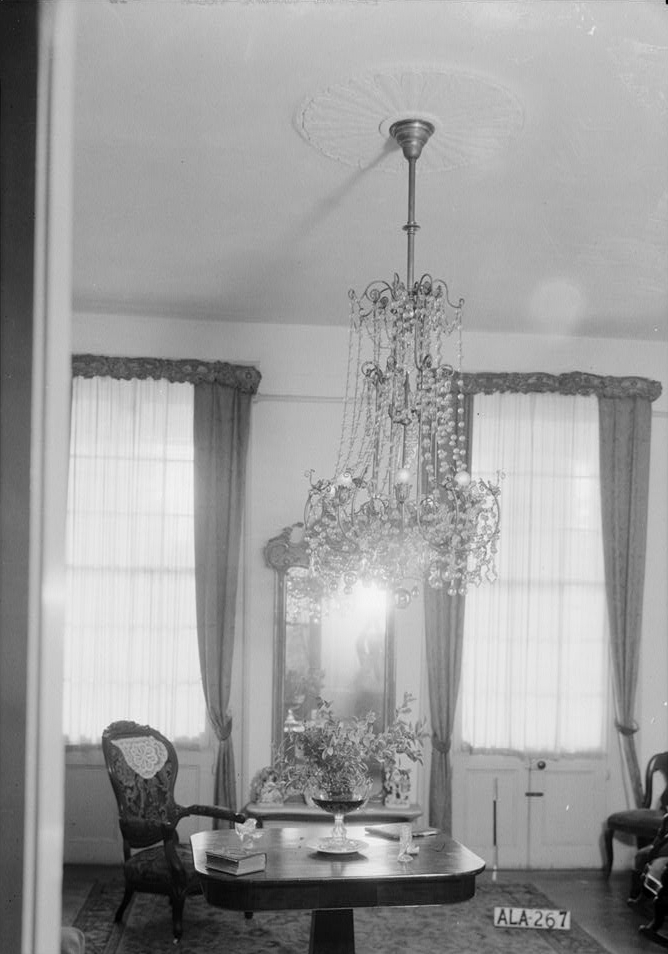
The living room in 1936

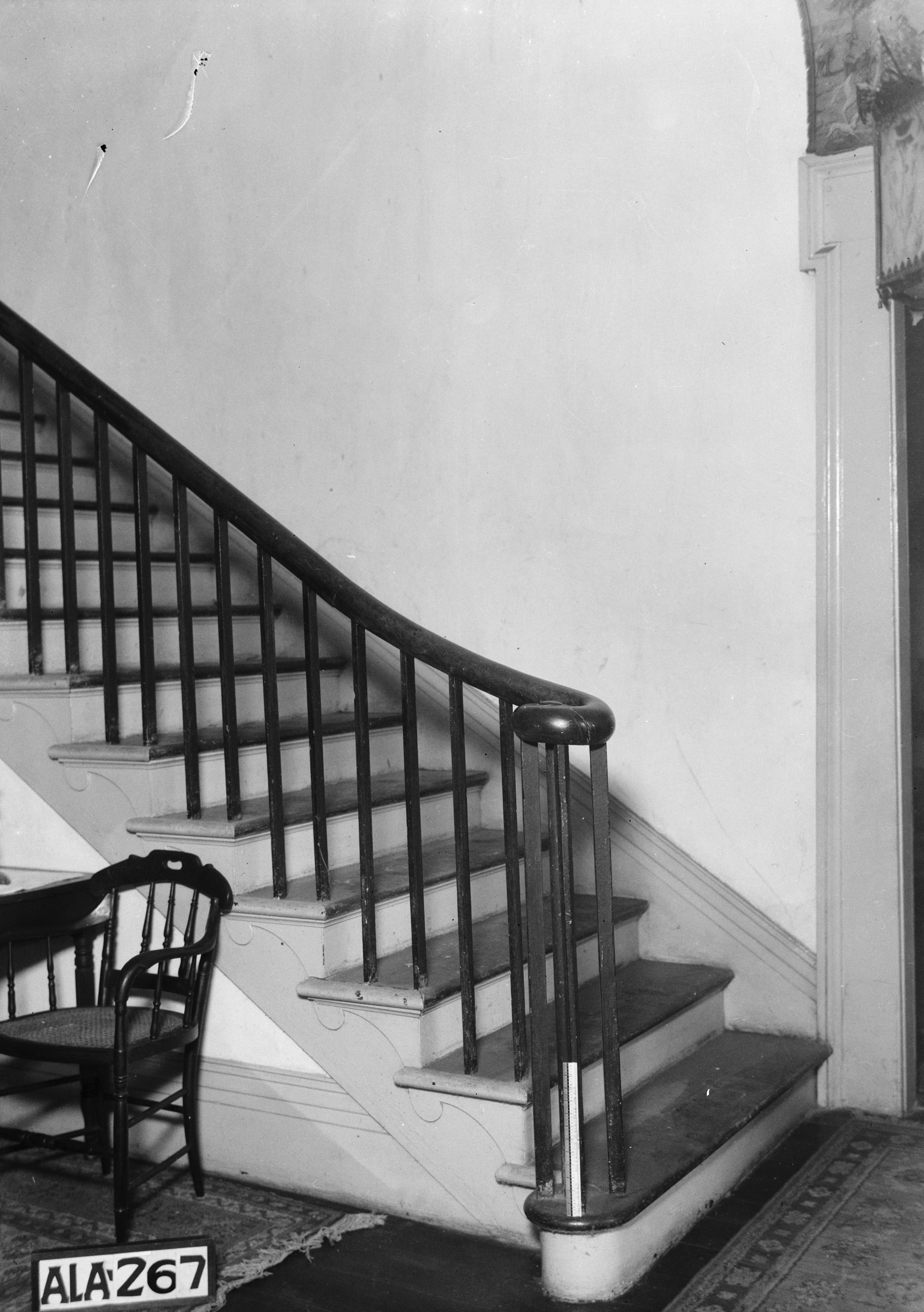
The staircase in 1936

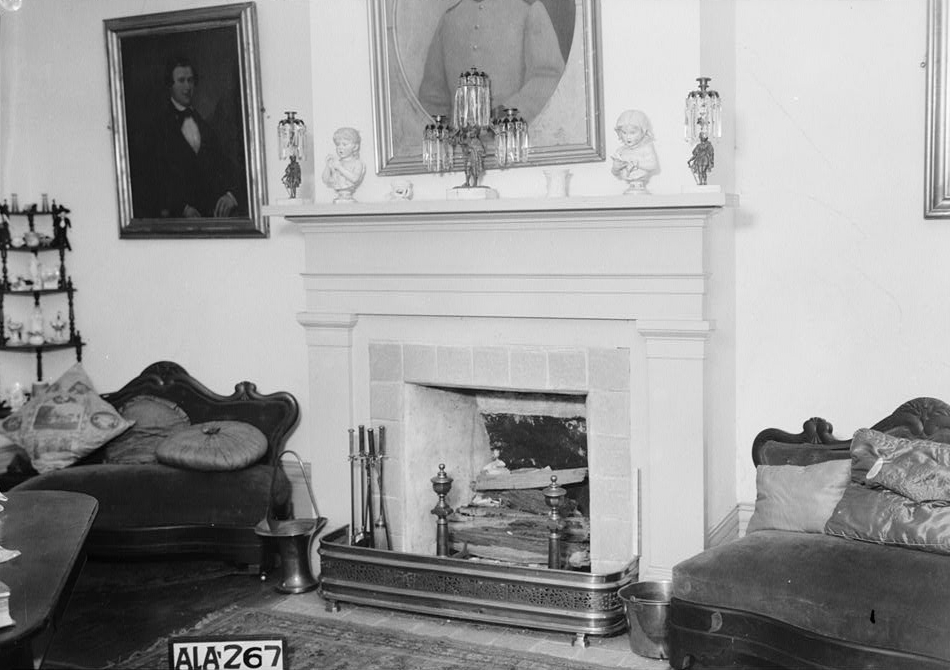
The front parlor 1936
