= George Henry Craig =

American politician (1845–1923)

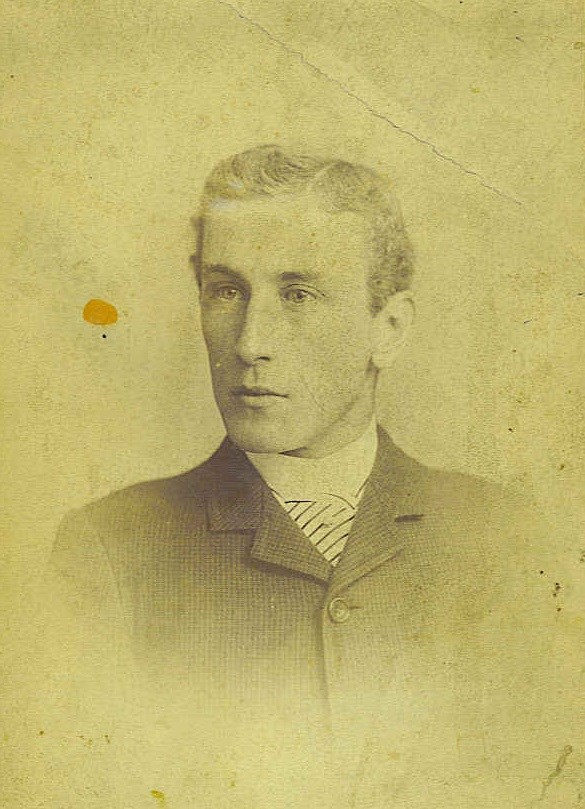

Member of the U.S. House of Representatives from Alabama's 4th district
- In office January 9, 1885 – March 3, 1885
- Preceded by: Charles M. Shelley
- Succeeded by: Alexander C. Davidson

Personal details
- Born: George Henry Craig; December 25, 1845 Cahaba, Alabama, US
- Died: January 26, 1923 (aged 77) Selma, Alabama, US
- Party: Republican

George Henry Craig (December 25, 1845 – January 26, 1923) was a U.S. representative from Alabama.

Born in Cahaba, Alabama, Craig attended the Cahaba Academy. He entered the Confederate States Army as a private in Colonel Byrd's regiment, Alabama Volunteers, at Mobile, in 1862. He attended the University of Alabama at Tuscaloosa as a cadet in 1863. He was promoted to first lieutenant of Infantry, and in 1863 again entered the Confederate service and remained until the end of the war. He resumed his studies at the University of Alabama in 1865. He studied law. He was admitted to the bar in December 1867 and commenced practice in Selma, Alabama.

Craig was elected solicitor of Dallas County in 1868. He was appointed sheriff of Dallas County in March 1869.

Craig was elected as judge of the criminal court of Dallas County in March 1870. He was appointed by the Governor in July 1874 judge of the first judicial circuit to fill an unexpired term and was elected to this position on November 4, 1874, and served until 1880. He resumed the practice of law in Selma, Alabama. He successfully contested as a Republican the election of Charles M. Shelley to the Forty-eighth Congress and served from January 9, 1885, to March 3, 1885. He was an unsuccessful candidate for reelection in 1884 to the Forty-ninth Congress. He was appointed United States attorney for the middle and northern districts of Alabama by President Arthur. He was appointed by President Cleveland a member of the Board of Visitors to the United States Military Academy at West Point in 1894. He resumed the practice of law in Selma, Alabama, and died there January 26, 1923. He was interred in Live Oak Cemetery.

U.S. House of Representatives
Preceded by Charles M. Shelley	Member of the U.S. House of Representatives from Alabama's 4th congressional district January 9, 1885 - March 3, 1885	Succeeded by Alexander C. Davidson
