= Freetown, Alabama =

African American community in Alabama

- Ghost town
- Location within Alabama Location within the United States
- Coordinates: 32°29′36″N 87°40′01″W
- Country: United States
- State: Alabama
- County: Hale

Population
  - Total: 0
- Time zone: UTC-6 (Central (CST))
  - Summer (DST): UTC-5 (CDT)

Freetown is a former African American community near Gallion, in Hale County, Alabama, United States, in the so-called Canebrake region. Land and buildings formerly owned by a local slave-owning planter were left to both free and enslaved African Americans who had worked for him and lived with him, and the community lasted until the 1920s. A church built by that community in 1929 burned down in 2022.

== History ==
The place was formed in 1867 by a group of African American men and women, some formerly enslaved, others free. They built their community on over six hundred acres (240 ha) of land left to them by the local planter John Collins.

Originally a man of modest means, Collins had migrated to Alabama from Virginia, in 1837, where he became an overseer for Henry Augustine Tayloe, a wealthy slaveholding planter and horse breeder. The soil was rich in the Canebrake region, and the Tayloes grew cotton on about 13,000 acres (5,300 ha), with the free forced labor of almost 800 enslaved people. Collins had (free) servants of color, one of whom, Nellie, his housekeeper, also became the mother to three sons of his (William, John and Albert). Collins never married; since Nellie was free (and had brought two daughters of her own, Susan and Maria, with her to Alabama), the sons were free too, though that was always a tenuous proposition in antebellum Alabama, and free people of color could easily be enslaved elsewhere if they could not prove their legal status. In the end, Collins became wealthy enough to become an enslaver himself, and bought land—and after Nellie disappeared, from his life perhaps and certainly from the historical record, Collins bought an enslaved person in Mobile, Fannie, with whom he had three more sons (George, Richard and Peter), who were legally enslaved, since their mother was. Collins was a wealthy man by 1860, owning over 3,000 acres (1,200 ha) of land worth more than a half million dollars. By that time he had enslaved 361 people.

Collins's three enslaved sons, George, Richard, and Peter, all learned trades. One of Nellie's daughters, Susan, became a housekeeper for Jeffries, the overseer of Collins's farm, and bore him two children, Thomas and John Jeffries. She had two more sons with her next partner, Jeffries's successor, Browder, named Lawrence and Henry.

When Collins died, much of his estate was left to his nephews, but he left a portion of it to William, John, and Albert, his sons with Nellie, and to Susan and two of her children Thomas Jeffries and Lawrence Browder. Also mentioned in the will were "Louise and her children, and the minor children of my late servant John, who died in the spring of 1866". "Louise" seems to have been the free woman of color Louisa Conway, who was married to the enslaved Bill Conway; she was willed the house in which she lived. She later married Peter Lee, who with his brother William Lee worked on Collins's estate. They were, apparently, the master builders who built St. Andrew's Episcopal Church, in nearby Prairieville. Peter Lee made furniture out of locally sourced hardwoods; his work was of such high quality that, according to Sharon Patton, it likely earned him the kind of respect among a people who "probably retained the high regard for artisans that they had in Africa". His children with Fannie, whom he did not name as his children but rather as his servants, were willed land.

The Freetown community started forming a church in 1867, as an open-air place of worship. Before that they had worshiped at St. Andrew's in Prairieville, in the afternoons—morning services were for whites. The locals often sent their children to school elsewhere, hoping to get them a better education than locally available. In the 1920s Freetown was incorporated into Allenville, Alabama, and that decade it was said to be at its peak; shortly thereafter, though, migration to cities spelled the end of the community. In 1929, the white-washed Bethlehem Baptist Church was dedicated, and this was the location for a historical marker that was placed in 2005. In August 2022, the church burned down.

== Names ==
These are the names of the people mentioned on the historical marker: "William, John, Albert, George, Richard, and Peter Collins; Susan and Lawrence Moore; Thomas Jeffries; the children of John Jeffries; and Louisa Conway and her children."
