= Charles Hays =

American politician (1834–1879)

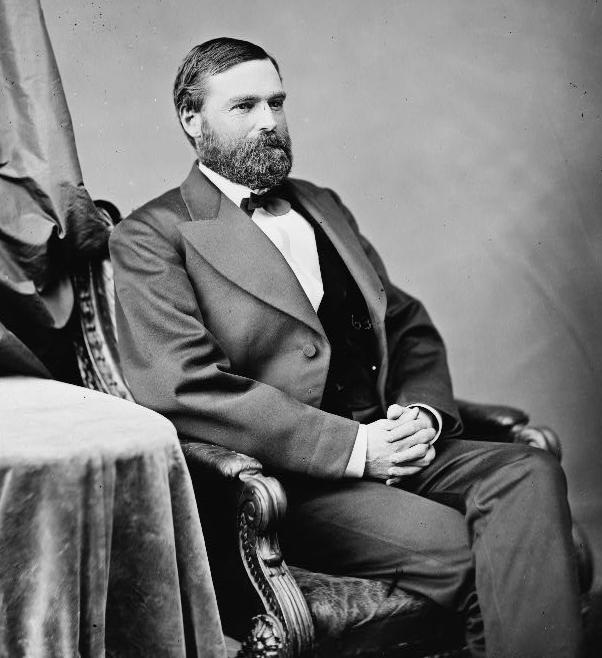

Member of the U.S. House of Representatives from Alabama's 4th district
- In office March 4, 1869 – March 3, 1877
- Preceded by: Charles W. Pierce
- Succeeded by: Charles M. Shelley

Member of the Alabama Senate from the 24th district
- In office 1868

Personal details
- Born: Charles Hays; February 2, 1834 Greene County, Alabama
- Died: June 24, 1879 (aged 45) Greene County, Alabama
- Party: Republican

Charles Hays (February 2, 1834 – June 24, 1879) was a U.S. representative from Alabama.

== Biography ==
Hays was born at "Hays Mount," in Greene County, Alabama near Boligee where he completed preparatory studies under private teachers.

He attended the University of Georgia at Athens and the University of Virginia at Charlottesville.

He was a cotton planter in Greene County and also engaged in other agricultural pursuits before becoming a delegate to the Democratic National Convention at Baltimore in 1860.

Hays was elected as a Republican to the Forty-first and to the three succeeding Congresses (March 4, 1869 – March 3, 1877) and served as chairman of the Committee on Agriculture (Forty-third Congress). In an 1876 report to the United States House of Representatives, the Committee on the Judiciary investigated charges against Hays "relating to the appointment of Guy R. Beardslee as a cadet at the United States Military Academy" and recommended no further action or charges against him.

He died at his home, "Myrtle Hall," in Greene County, Alabama, June 24, 1879 and was interred in the family cemetery, "Hays Mount" plantation.

U.S. House of Representatives
Preceded by Charles W. Pierce	Member of the U.S. House of Representatives from Alabama's 4th congressional district 1869-1877	Succeeded by Charles M. Shelley
