= Alexander C. Davidson =

American politician and planter (1826–1897)

Member of the U.S. House of Representatives from Alabama's 4th district
- In office March 4, 1885 – March 3, 1889
- Preceded by: George Henry Craig
- Succeeded by: Louis W. Turpin

Member of the Alabama Senate
- In office 1882–1885

Member of the Alabama House of Representatives
- In office 1880–1881

Personal details
- Born: Alexander Caldwell Davidson; December 26, 1826 Charlotte, North Carolina, US
- Died: November 6, 1897 (aged 70) Uniontown, Alabama, US
- Party: Democratic
- Occupation: Politician, planter

Alexander Caldwell Davidson (December 26, 1826 – November 6, 1897) was an American politician and planter. A Democrat, he was a member of the United States House of Representatives from Alabama.

Born near Charlotte, North Carolina, Davidson graduated from the University of Alabama. He became a planter, owning the Westwood along with 30 slaves. He may have fought in the American Civil War. He served in both branches of the Alabama Legislature, then served in the House from 1885 to 1889.

== Biography ==
Davidson was born on December 26, 1826, near Charlotte, North Carolina, one of four children born to planter and railroader John Howard Davidson and Martha Caldwell Davidson. He was the maternal grandson of minister David Caldwell and the maternal great-grandson of John Davidson, a signer of the purported Mecklenburg Declaration of Independence. He likely had a sister. In 1835, the family moved to Marengo County, Alabama, where he attended public schools. He graduated from the University of Alabama on July 11, 1848; in 1850, the university awarded him a Master of Arts.

Davidson read law, but was never a lawyer. He instead worked as a cotton farmer near Uniontown. By 1860, he owned thirty slaves. He owned the Westwood plantation and its 4,700 acres of farmland, which he had purchased from his stepfather, James Lewis Price. Information regarding his service in the American Civil War is conflicting. One source claims he enlisted as an infantryman into the 167th Infantry Regiment on April 25, 1861, while another claims he participated in the First Battle of Bull Run and was later a military officer. The Birmingham News that he was unable to serve due to a physical disability.

Davidson was a Democrat. He was a member of the Alabama House of Representatives in 1880 and 1881, then was a member of the Alabama Senate from 1882 to 1885. However, The Political Graveyard claims he was a member of the Alabama Legislature in 1860. He served in the United States House of Representatives from March 4, 1885, to March 3, 1889, representing Alabama's 4th district. While serving, he was a member of the Committees on Agriculture, on Labor, and on Ventilation and Acoustics. He lost the primaries to the following election. Politically, he was liberal.

After serving in Congress, Davidson returned to farming. On May 3, 1860, he married Maria Overton Price, with whom he had five children. He was a member of the Episcopal Church. In 1894 or 1895, he became partially paralyzed, and in August or September 1897, broke his leg due to a fall. He died on November 6, 1897, aged 70, at the Westwood plantation in Uniontown. He was buried at the Holy Cross Cemetery, in Uniontown.

U.S. House of Representatives
| Preceded by George H. Craig | Member of the U.S. House of Representatives from Alabama's 4th congressional district March 4, 1885 - March 3, 1889 | Succeeded by Louis W. Turpin |
