= Charles Wilson Pierce =

American politician (1823–1907)

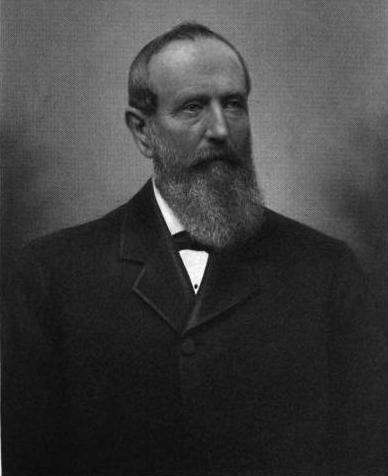

Member of the U.S. House of Representatives from Alabama's 4th district
- In office July 21, 1868 – March 3, 1869
- Preceded by: District inactive
- Succeeded by: Charles Hays

Member of the Nebraska Senate
- In office 1877; 1880

Personal details
- Born: Charles Wilson Pierce; October 7, 1823 Benton, New York, US
- Died: February 18, 1907 (aged 83) Hastings, Florida, US
- Party: Republican

Charles Wilson Pierce (October 7, 1823 – February 18, 1907) was a U.S. representative from Alabama.

== Biography ==
Born in Benton, New York, Pierce completed preparatory studies. He moved with his father to Sandusky, Ohio, in 1829, and from there to Huntsville, Ohio, in 1847. He moved to Havana, Illinois, in 1855. During the Civil War enlisted in Company B, Eighty-fifth Regiment, Illinois Volunteer Infantry, and was elected first lieutenant. He was appointed quartermaster June 14, 1864. Commissioned major in 1865. He settled in Demopolis, Alabama. Held various public offices. Upon the readmission of Alabama to representation was elected as a Republican to the Fortieth Congress and served from July 21, 1868, to March 3, 1869. He declined to be a candidate for renomination. He moved to Nebraska in 1872. He served as member of the Nebraska State constitutional convention in 1875.

Pierce was elected to the State senate in 1877 and reelected in 1880. He resigned in 1881 to become register of the United States land office, which position he held until May 1886. He returned to his farm. He died in Hastings, Florida, February 18, 1907. He was interred in the family plot on the home farm near Waverly, Nebraska.

U.S. House of Representatives
Preceded by District inactive	Member of the U.S. House of Representatives from Alabama's 4th congressional district July 21, 1868 - March 3, 1869	Succeeded by Charles Hays
