= Charles M. Shelley =

American politician (1833–1907)

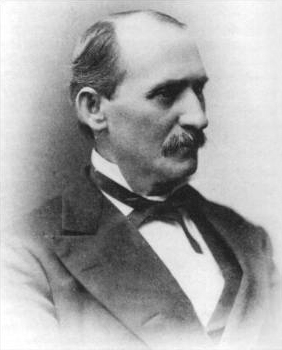

Member of the U.S. House of Representatives from Alabama's 4th district
- In office November 4, 1882 – January 9, 1885
- Preceded by: Himself
- Succeeded by: George H. Craig
- In office March 4, 1877 – July 20, 1882
- Preceded by: Charles Hays
- Succeeded by: Himself

Personal details
- Born: Charles Miller Shelley; December 28, 1833 Sullivan County, Tennessee, US
- Died: January 20, 1907 (aged 73) Birmingham, Alabama, US
- Party: Democratic
- Spouse(s): Kathleen McConnell; Ann Olivia McConnell

Military service
- Allegiance: Confederate States
- Branch/service: Confederate States Army
- Years of service: 1861-1865
- Rank: Brigadier General (CSA)
- Battles/wars: American Civil War

Charles Miller Shelley (December 28, 1833 – January 20, 1907) was a brigadier general in the Confederate States Army during the American Civil War and a late Reconstruction era U.S. Representative from Alabama.

== Early life ==
Shelley was born in Sullivan County, Tennessee. He moved with his father to Selma, Alabama, in 1836. He received limited schooling, but showed an aptitude for architecture. He became an architect and builder in the 1850s.

== Civil War ==
With the outbreak of the Civil War, Shelley first entered the Confederate Army in February 1861 as a first lieutenant and was stationed first at Fort Morgan. Afterward, he was attached to the 5th Alabama Infantry and rose through the ranks to be commissioned as a brigadier general. Of the 1,100 men of Cantey's Brigade he led at Franklin, 430 were left on the field. General Hood has said that the strategy of General Shelley saved Stewart's corps from capture. James Shelley, Lieutenant Colonel of the 10th Alabama, killed at Petersburg, was a brother of General Shelley.

== Postbellum career ==
Shelley was first elected to Congress on November 7, 1876, from Alabama's 4th congressional district. He received 37.77% of the vote, but since the Republican vote was split between their nominee James T. Rapier (who won about 28%) and the incumbent Jeremiah Haralson, who ran as an independent and gained more than 33% of the vote, Shelley won the election.

Shelly ran for reelection in 1878. With the end of Reconstruction and the rise of Democratic intimidation and violence against African American voters, his reelection was much easier. He got 55.38% of the vote. This was 8,514 votes, fewer than the 9,655 he had gotten two years before, indicating a contraction in the size of the electorate in the interim. Haralson made another run for office this year but received only 6,545 votes, or 42.57% of the vote. Democratic intimidation of black Republicans had reduced their voting.

Shelley presented his credentials as a Member-elect to the Forty-seventh Congress, but the election was contested by James Q. Smith and the seat declared vacant July 20, 1882. Shelley was subsequently elected to fill the vacancy thus caused and served from November 7, 1882, to March 3, 1883. He presented credentials as a Member-elect to the Forty-eighth Congress and served from March 4, 1883, to January 9, 1885, when he was succeeded by George H. Craig, who contested the election. In May 1885, he was appointed as the fourth auditor of the United States Department of the Treasury.

Shelley returned to Birmingham, Alabama. He engaged in promoting the industrial interests of that region until his death in that city. He was interred in Oak Hill Cemetery, Talladega, Alabama.

== See also ==
- List of American Civil War generals (Confederate)

== Notes ==
U.S. House of Representatives
Preceded by Charles Hays	Member of the U.S. House of Representatives from Alabama's 4th congressional district March 4, 1877 - July 20, 1882	Succeeded by Himself
Preceded by Himself	Member of the U.S. House of Representatives from Alabama's 4th congressional district November 7, 1882 - January 9, 1885	Succeeded by George H. Craig
