= Westwood (Uniontown, Alabama) =

Historic house in Alabama, United States

- U.S. National Register of Historic Places
- U.S. Historic district
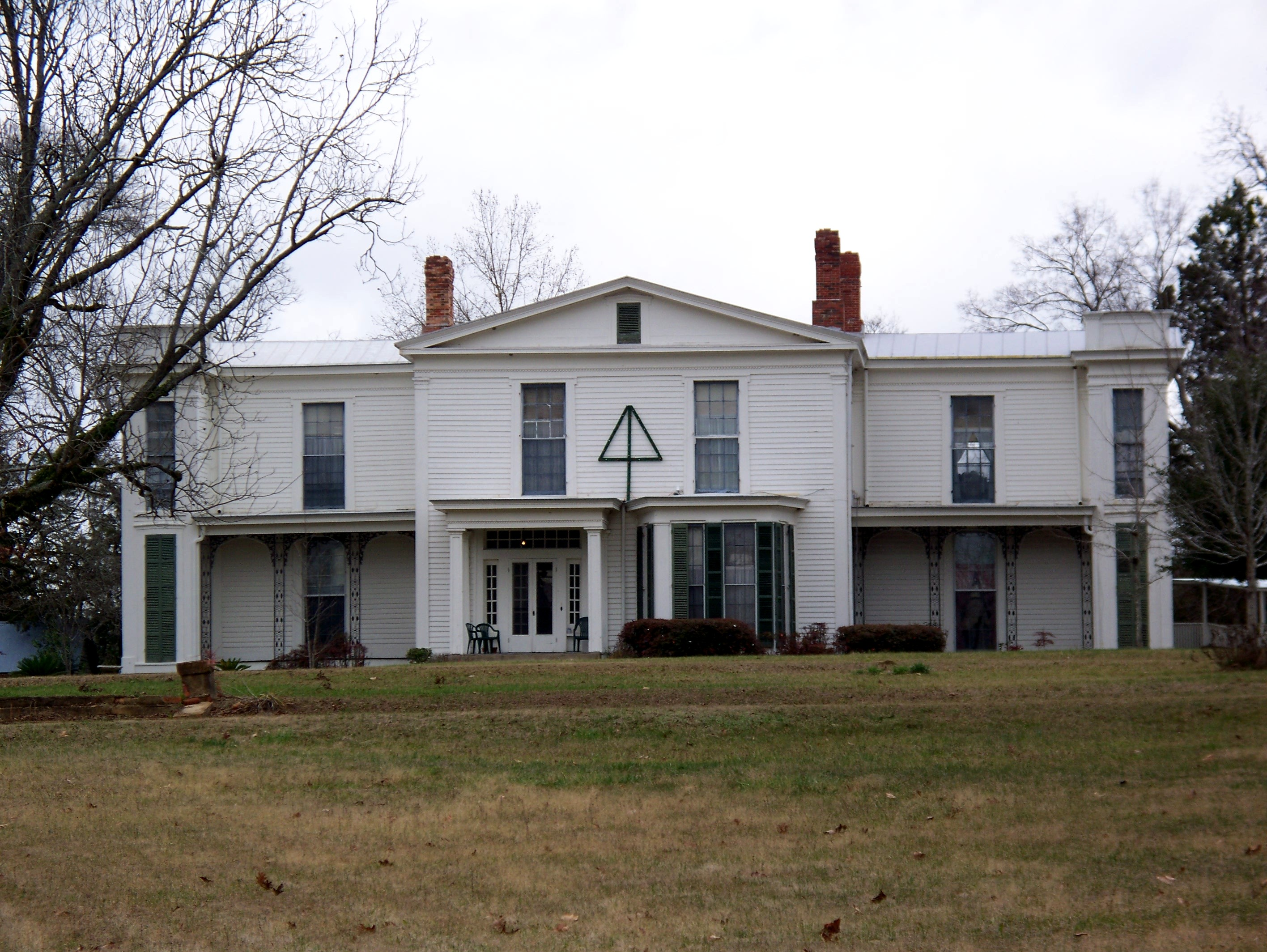
- The front elevation of Westwood in 2008

- Location within Alabama Location within the United States
- Nearest city: Uniontown, Alabama
- Coordinates: 32°27′35″N 87°30′53″W
- Built: 1836-1850
- Architectural style: Greek Revival; Italianate
- NRHP reference No.: 74000433, 84000488, 84000719
- Added to NRHP: November 21, 1974

Westwood is a historic plantation in Uniontown, Alabama, United States. The main house was built between 1836 and 1850 by James Lewis Price. It is in the Greek Revival style with some Italianate influence. The outbuildings include a smokehouse with architectural detailing identical to the main house, a carriage house, a dairy, and a cook's quarters. Westwood Plantation was added to the National Register of Historic Places as a historic district on November 21, 1974. Boundary increases were made to the district on March 15, 1984, and December 10, 1984.

== History ==
James Lewis Price migrated to Perry County in 1835 from his native Richmond, Virginia. He began building Westwood in 1836, naming it after his grandfather's Virginia home. His slaves cleared the land and were responsible for the construction of his estate, including the main house. By 1850 Price had finished work on Westwood, now its sprawling plan was complete with projecting corner pavilions and two-story end loggias with recessed cast-iron porches. Westwood currently continues to be owned by Price descendants. The 1860 United States census of Perry County indicates that James Lewis Price owned 108 slaves in that year.

== Gallery ==
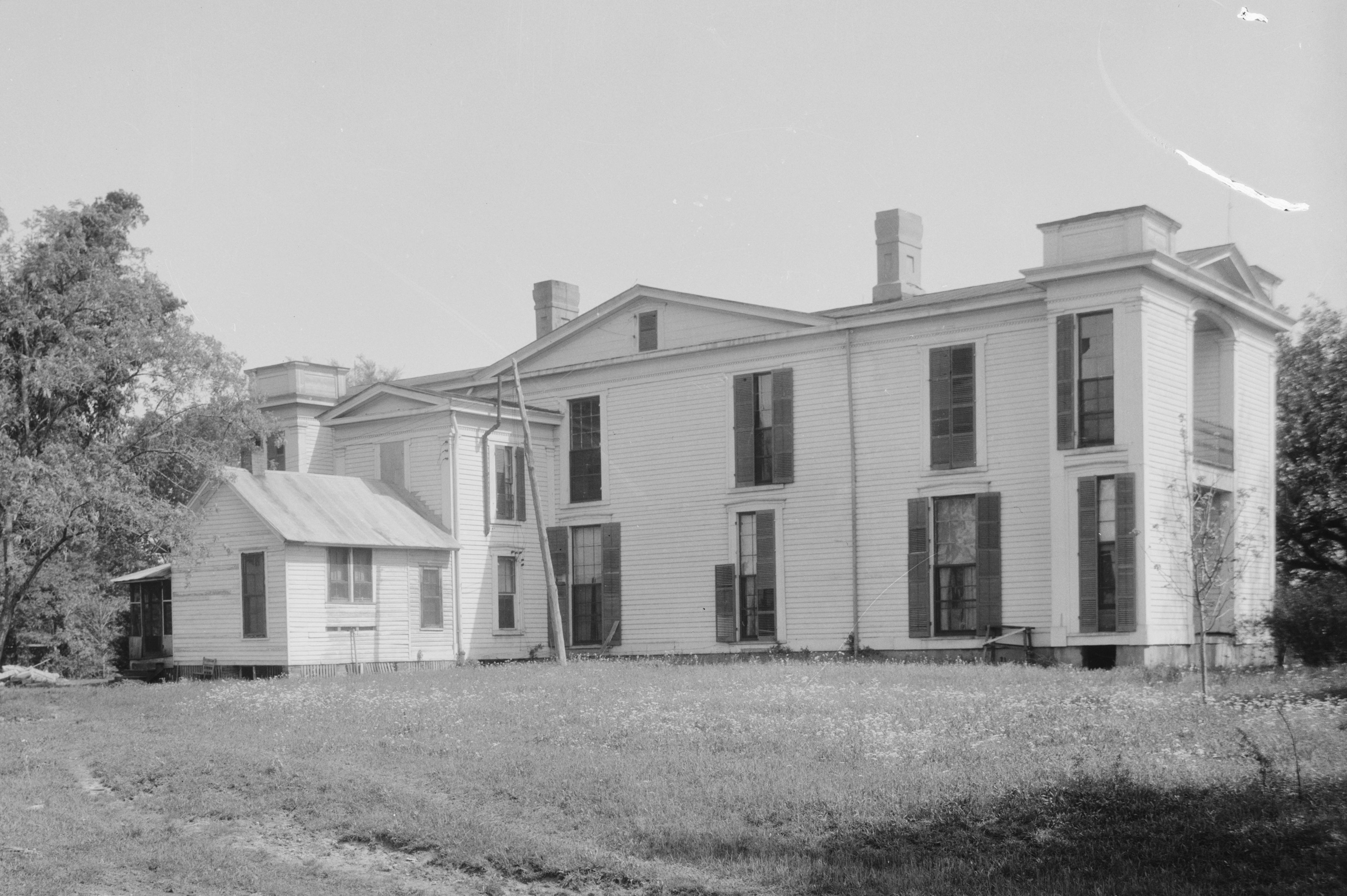
Rear and side view of the exterior in 1935

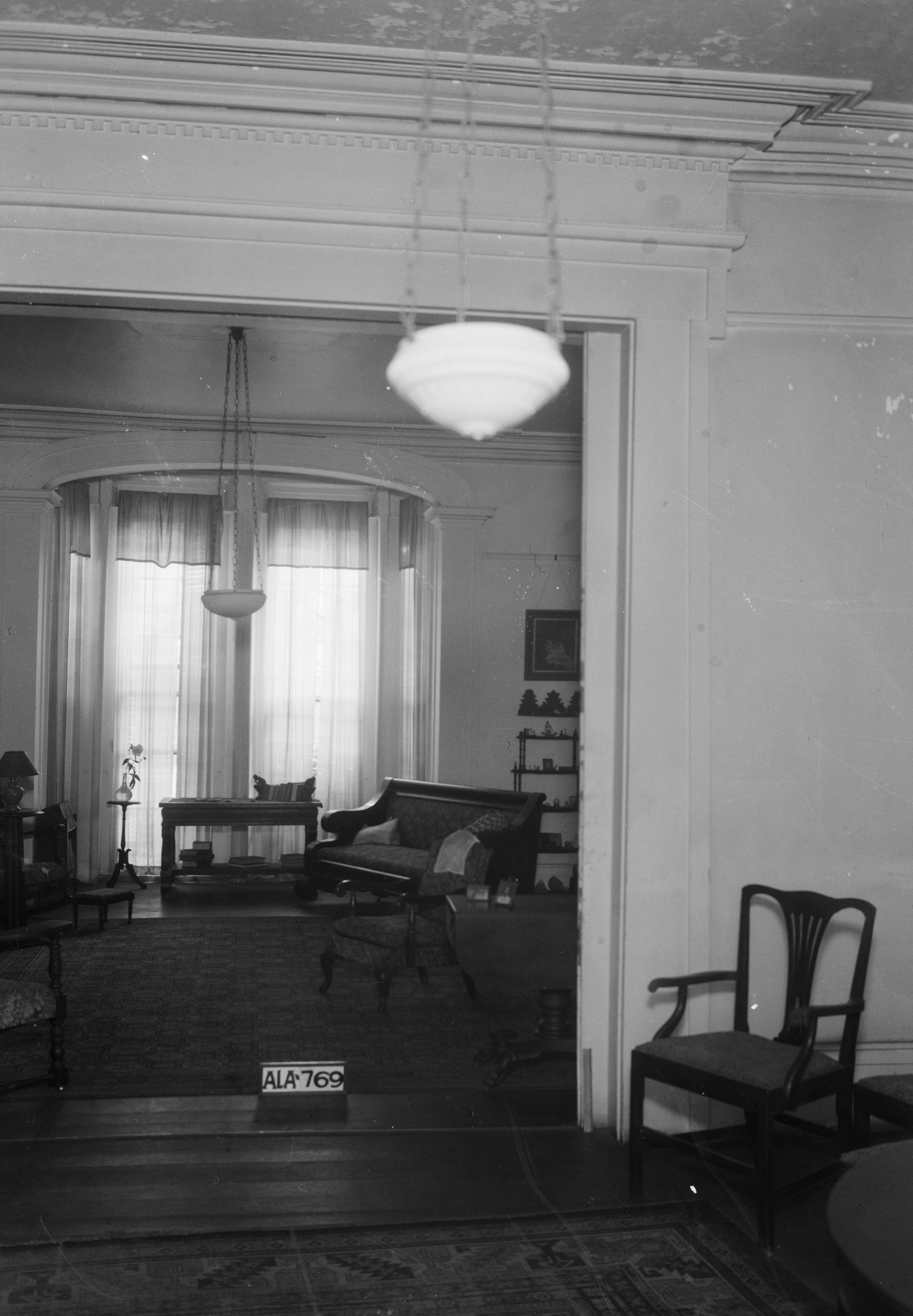
View through the dining room into the parlor

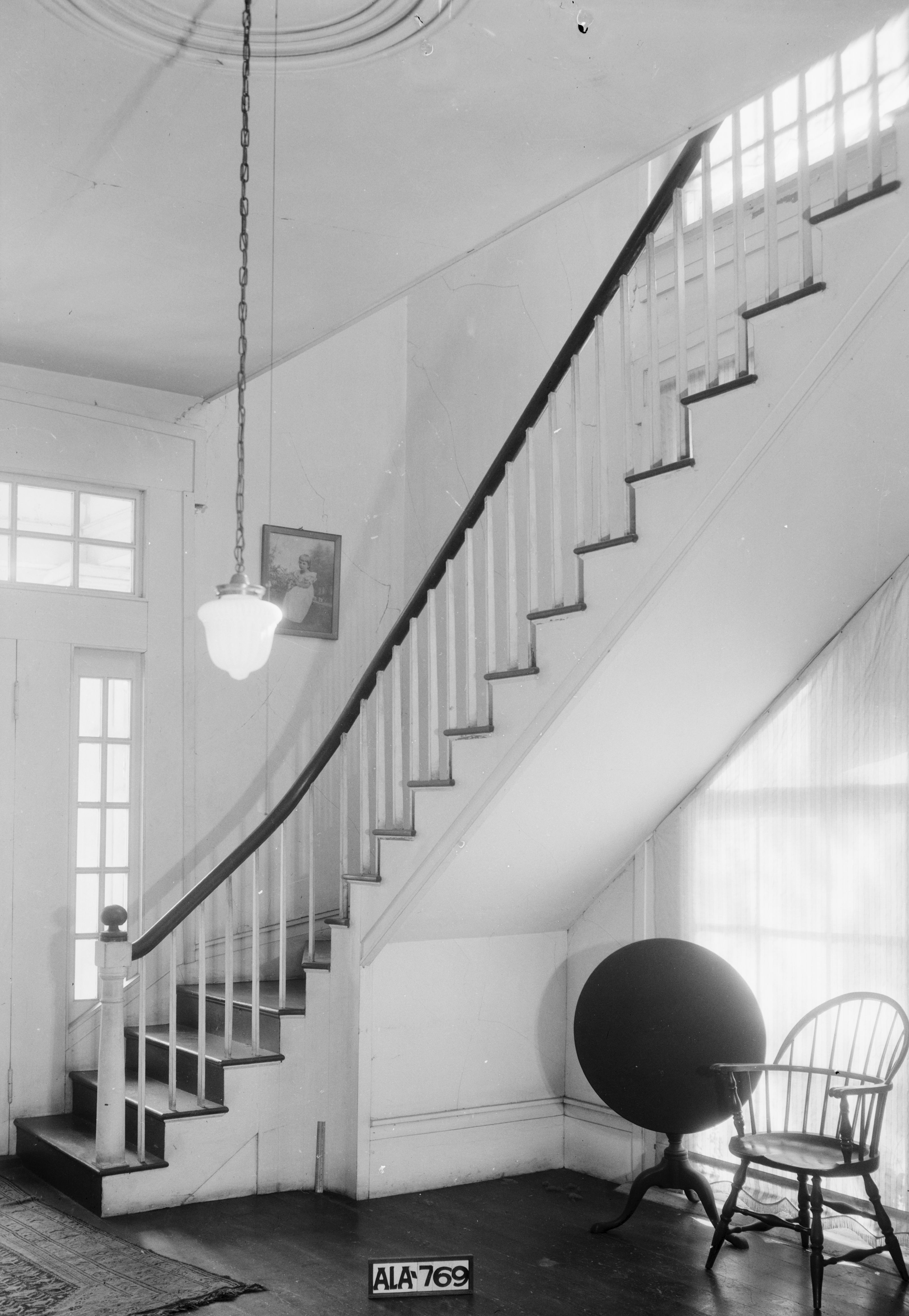
Main hall and stairway
