= Uniontown Historic District (Uniontown, Alabama) =

Historic district in Alabama, United States

- U.S. National Register of Historic Places
- U.S. Historic district
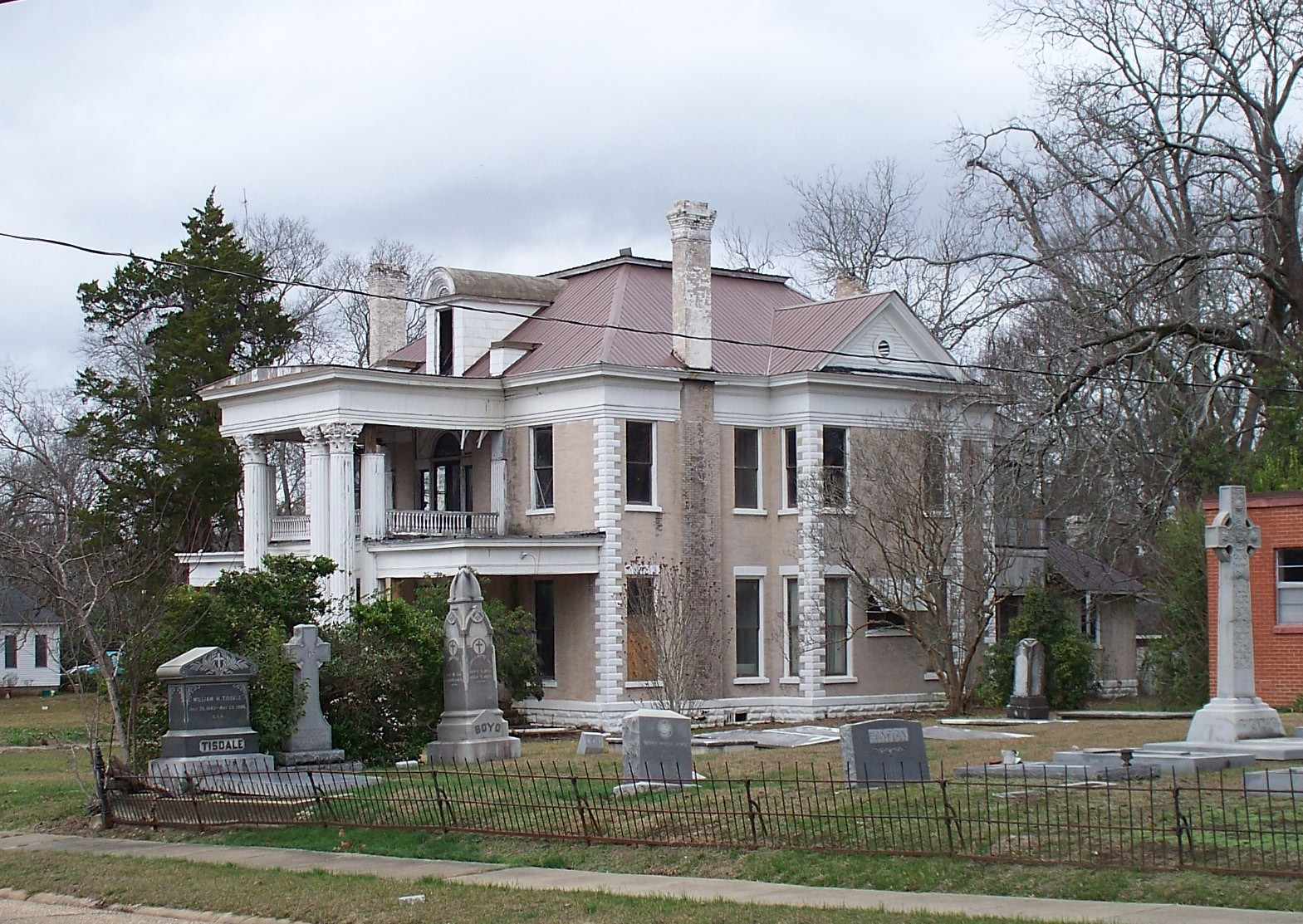
- Co-Nita Manor, a contributing property to the Uniontown Historic District

- Location within Alabama Location within the United States
- Location: Roughly bounded by Tomasene St., Taylor St., East Ave., and Green St., Uniontown, Alabama
- Coordinates: 32°27′10″N 87°30′52″W
- Architectural style: Greek Revival, Queen Anne, Classical Revival
- NRHP reference No.: 00000137
- Added to NRHP: February 24, 2000

The Uniontown Historic District is a historic district in Uniontown, Alabama. It is roughly bounded by Tomasene Street, Taylor Street, East Avenue, and Green Street. It contains a variety of mid-to-late 19th and early 20th century architectural styles, most notably examples of Greek Revival, Queen Anne, and Classical Revival. The district was added to the National Register of Historic Places on February 24, 2000.

== Notable contributing properties ==
- First Presbyterian Church (Uniontown, Alabama)
