= Gallion, Alabama =

Unincorporated community in Alabama, United States

- Unincorporated community
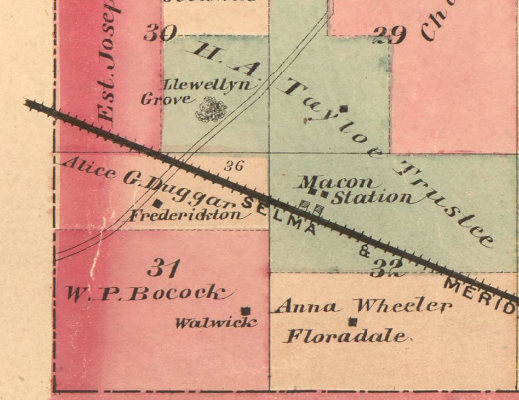
- Gallion, Alabama, from Snedecor's map of Hale County, Alabama, 1870

- Location in Alabama Gallion (the United States)
- Coordinates: 32°29′48″N 87°42′58″W
- Country: United States
- State: Alabama
- County: Hale
- Elevation: 190 ft (58 m)
- Time zone: UTC-6 (Central (CST))
  - Summer (DST): UTC-5 (CDT)
- ZIP code: 36742
- Area code: 334
- GNIS feature ID: 155075

Gallion, originally known as Macon Station, was a plantation owned by Henry Augustine Tayloe on the Demopolis to Uniontown Rail Line in Hale County, Alabama. It is now known as Gallion to honor Jo Gallion, a railroad official, and is an unincorporated community in the aforementioned county. Gallion has a post office with a ZIP code of 36742. Gallion has one site on the National Register of Historic Places, a plantation house known as Waldwic.

In 1867, an African-American community named Freetown was established near Gallion.

== Geography ==
Gallion is located at 32.49681, -87.71612 and has an elevation of 194 feet (59 m).

== Notable person ==
- Benjamin Minge Duggar, botanist, discoverer of tetracycline
- Henry Augustine Tayloe, founder of Macon Station, which later became Gallion

== Climate ==
The climate in this area is characterized by hot, humid summers and generally mild to cool winters. According to the Köppen Climate Classification system, Gallion has a humid subtropical climate, abbreviated "Cfa" on climate maps.
