= Uniontown, Alabama =

City in Alabama, United States

Uniontown
- City
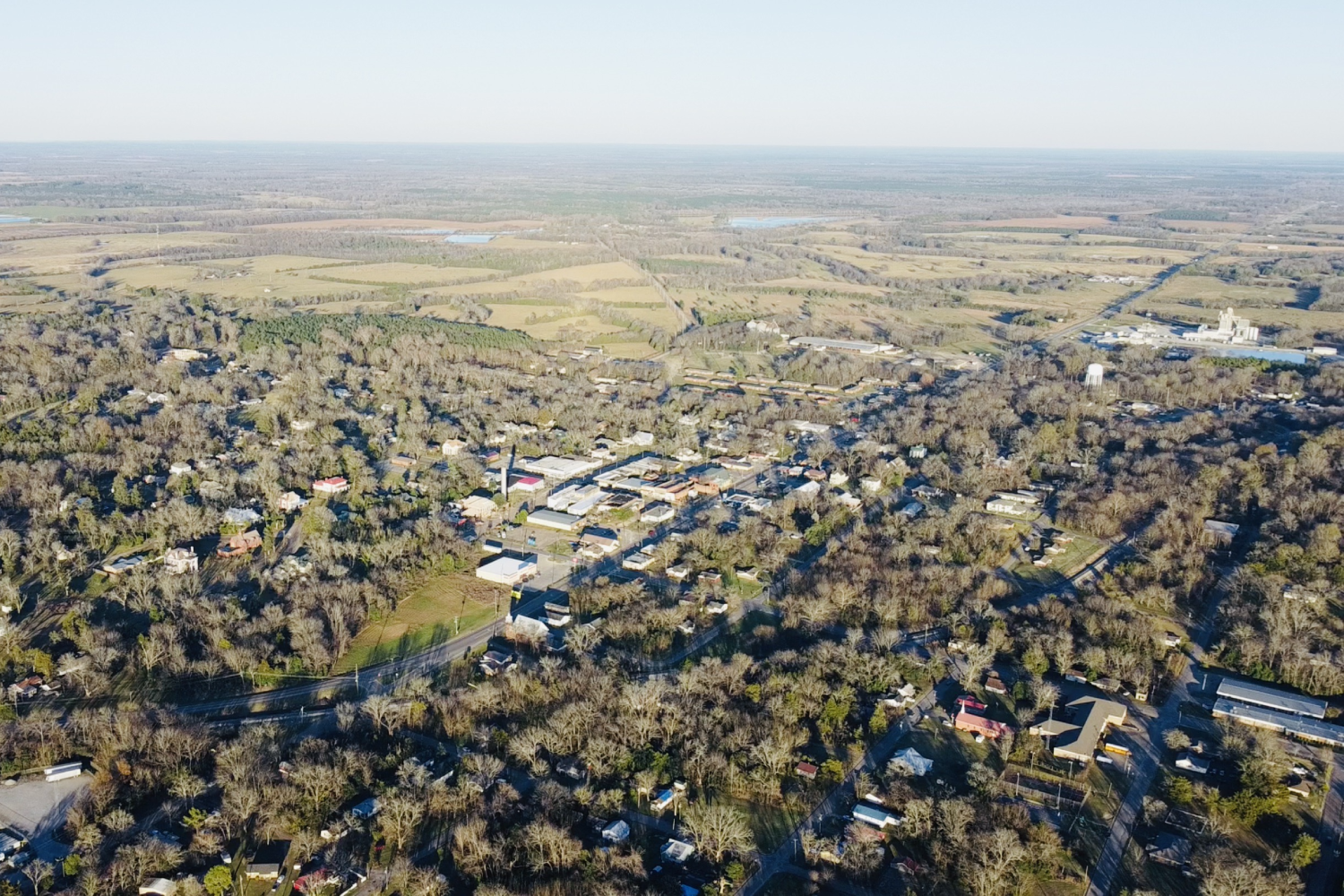
- Aerial view of Uniontown, Alabama. View is looking to the northeast. Uniontown Municipal Building (City Hall) and Uniontown's Historic Water Tower is visible slightly left of center in the picture.

- Location of Uniontown in Perry County, Alabama
- Coordinates: 32°26′56″N 87°30′14″W
- Country: United States
- State: Alabama
- County: Perry

Area
  - Total: 15.19 sq mi (39.35 km^{2})
  - Land: 15.18 sq mi (39.31 km^{2})
  - Water: 0.015 sq mi (0.04 km^{2})
- Elevation: 230 ft (70 m)

Population (2020)
  - Total: 2,107
  - Density: 139/sq mi (53.6/km^{2})
- Time zone: UTC-6 (Central (CST))
  - Summer (DST): UTC-5 (CDT)
- ZIP code: 36786
- Area code: 334
- FIPS code: 01-77904
- GNIS feature ID: 2406779
- Website: uniontownal.com

Uniontown is a city in Perry County, Alabama, in west-central Alabama. As of the 2020 census, the population of the city is 2,107, up 18.7% over 2010. Of the 573 cities in Alabama, Uniontown is the 207th most populous.

Uniontown has four sites listed on the National Register of Historic Places: Fairhope Plantation, Pitts' Folly, the Uniontown Historic District, and Westwood.

== History ==
First settled in 1818, the area that would become Uniontown was initially called Woodville after the first family settling there; the town was incorporated on December 23, 1836. Woodville was the terminus of one of the earliest plank roads (a road paved with wooden planks) in the state, which was constructed in 1848 and connected Woodville with Demopolis. The Alabama and Mississippi Railroad came through the town in 1857.

By 1860, the town had grown enough to support educational facilities for both boys and girls. In addition to the schools, the town had a number of businesses on its main street, including two department stores, and the town's economy was tied closely to the surrounding plantations. The town became known as Uniontown in 1861 at the suggestion of a local planter, Philip Weaver, whose hometown was Uniontown, Maryland. Uniontown sent a number of men to fight with the Canebrake Rifle Guards during the Civil War, a unit named after the geographical region in which Uniontown is located, as well as in another unit known as the Independent Troop of Uniontown. The area remained tied to the agricultural economy after the war.

In 1897, the Uniontown Cotton Oil Company was established in the town, one of the first facilities of its kind in the state and one of the first industrial businesses in Perry County; it manufactured cotton seed oil and cottonseed meal.

By 1900, the town had cotton gins, cotton warehouses, and a cotton mill. The city also had electricity and telephone services by this time. Less than two decades later, however, Uniontown began to lose population as more people abandoned plantations, largely because of the boll weevil's ruinous effect on the cotton crop. The town remains largely dependent on agricultural activities, including livestock farming, in the surrounding area.

After a 2008 spill of hazardous coal ash in Tennessee, four million cubic yards of the ash was moved to the Arrowhead Landfill in Uniontown. That facility is licensed to accept toxic waste from 33 states.

== Geography ==
According to the U.S. Census Bureau, the city has a total area of 15.19 square miles (39.3 km^{2}), 15.18 square miles (39.3 km^{2}) land and 0.02 square miles (0.052 km^{2}) water.

=== Climate ===
The climate in this area is characterized by hot, humid summers and generally mild to cool winters. According to the Köppen Climate Classification system, Uniontown has a humid subtropical climate, abbreviated "Cfa" on climate maps.

== Demographics ==
Historical population
Census	Pop.	Note	%±
1850	290		—
1870	1,444		—
1880	810		−43.9%
1890	854		5.4%
1900	1,047		22.6%
1910	1,836		75.4%
1920	1,359		−26.0%
1930	1,424		4.8%
1940	1,869		31.3%
1950	1,798		−3.8%
1960	1,993		10.8%
1970	2,133		7.0%
1980	2,112		−1.0%
1990	1,730		−18.1%
2000	1,623		−6.2%
2010	1,775		9.4%
2020	2,107		18.7%
U.S. Decennial Census; 2013 Estimate

=== 2010 census ===
At the census of 2010, there were 2,684 people, 720 households, and 530 families living in the city. The population density was 1,365.4 inhabitants per square mile (527.2/km^{2}). There were 764 housing units at an average density of 587.7 per square mile (226.9/km^{2}). The racial makeup of the city was 90.6% Black or African American and 9.1% White. 0.5% of the population were Hispanic or Latino of any race.

Of the 720 households within the city, 36.8% had children under the age of 18 living with them, 20.2% were married couples living together, 44.2% had a female householder with no husband present, and 30.5% were non-families. 28.5% of households were one person and 9.5% were one person aged 65 or older. The average household size was 2.69 and the average family size was 3.27.

The age distribution was 35.8% under the age of 18, 9.8% from 18 to 24, 22.9% from 25 to 44, 21.2% from 45 to 64, and 10.3% 65 or older. The median age was 28.4 years. For every 100 females, there were 79.7 males. For every 100 females age 18 and over, there were 72.4 males.

The median household income was $15,054 and the median family income was $17,473. Males had a median income of $34,038 versus $23,438 for females. The per capita income for the city was $9,452. About 43.1% of families and 45.2% of the population were below the poverty line, including 55.2% of those under age 18 and 51.5% of those age 65 or over.

=== 2020 census ===
Uniontown racial composition
Race	Num.	Perc.
White (non-Hispanic)	162	7.69%
Black or African American (non-Hispanic)	1,903	90.32%
Native American	4	0.19%
Other/Mixed	27	1.28%
Hispanic or Latino	11	0.52%

As of the 2020 United States census, there were 2,107 people, 704 households, and 319 families residing in the town.

== Local events ==
Uniontown is known for their eleven state high school basketball championships. The last championship team was led by former Auburn University guard Frankie Sullivan, who scored fifty-one points in the championship game.

== Notable people ==
- Juanita Abernathy, civil rights activist
- Augusta Clark, Pennsylvania politician, was born in Uniontown
- Tony Cox, actor, born in Uniontown in 1958
- Alexander C. Davidson, former U.S. Congressman for the 4th District of Alabama
- Erwin Dudley, professional basketball player
- Morris Ernst, lawyer and co-founder of the American Civil Liberties Union
- Eugene Lipscomb, football player, born in Uniontown in 1931
- Zeke Smith, NFL player
- Alvin Milton Spessard (1860–1924), Alabama state politician and educator
- Martha Goodwin Tunstall, suffragist, born in Uniontown in 1838
- Holland Dai'mon Witherspoon, musician
