= National Register of Historic Places listings in Lauderdale County, Alabama =

Location of Lauderdale County in Alabama

This is a list of the National Register of Historic Places listings in Lauderdale County, Alabama.

This is intended to be a complete list of the properties and districts on the National Register of Historic Places in Lauderdale County, Alabama, United States. Latitude and longitude coordinates are provided for many National Register properties and districts; these locations may be seen together in an online map.

There are 33 properties and districts listed on the National Register in the county, including one National Historic Landmark.

This National Park Service list is complete through NPS recent listings posted January 16, 2026.

== Current listings ==
	Name on the Register	Image	Date listed	Location	City or town	Description
1	Peter F. Armistead Sr. House		July 9, 1986 (#86001540)	Waterloo Rd. 34°50′28″N 87°44′24″W	Florence	
2	William Bowen Lustron House	William Bowen Lustron House	February 24, 2000 (#00000135)	1145 Wildwood Park Rd. 34°49′00″N 87°41′18″W	Florence	
3	Cherry Street Historic District	Cherry Street Historic District	July 3, 1997 (#97000648)	Cherry St. between Hermitage Dr. and E. Tombigbee St. 34°48′29″N 87°40′21″W	Florence	
4	Coffee High School		February 4, 1982 (#82002045)	319 Hermitage Dr. 34°48′29″N 87°40′34″W	Florence	Demolished
5	College Place Historic District	College Place Historic District	January 12, 1995 (#94001547)	Along Sherrod Ave. between W. Lelia St. and Circular Rd.; also roughly along W. Lelia and W. Mattie Lou Sts. 34°48′46″N 87°40′51″W	Florence	Second set of boundaries represents a boundary increase of September 14, 1998
6	George Coulter House	George Coulter House	January 21, 1982 (#82002046)	420 S. Pine St. 34°47′46″N 87°40′32″W	Florence	
7	Courtview	Courtview	June 13, 1974 (#74000415)	Court St. 34°48′21″N 87°40′46″W	Florence	
8	E.H. Darby Lustron House	E.H. Darby Lustron House	February 24, 2000 (#00000127)	321 Beverly Ave. 34°47′30″N 87°41′19″W	Florence	
9	Downtown Florence Historic District	Downtown Florence Historic District	August 22, 1995 (#95001021)	Roughly the eastern side of Court St. from 104 N. Court to 119 S. Court, 100-128 E. Tennessee St., and 106, 108, and 110 S. Seminary St.; also roughly bounded by Pine St., Alabama St., Wood Ave., and Tuscaloosa St. 34°48′00″N 87°40′31″W	Florence	Second set of boundaries represents a boundary increase of December 18, 2001
10	Florence Wagon Works Site		June 13, 1996 (#96000596)	South of Dekalb Ave. between Main and Spurr Sts. 34°48′09″N 87°38′35″W	Florence	
11	Forks of Cypress	Forks of Cypress	October 10, 1997 (#97001166)	Jackson Rd., roughly 1.5 miles northwest of the junction of Cox Creek Parkway and Jackson Rd. 34°50′42″N 87°43′32″W	Florence	
12	Forks of Cypress Cemetery	Forks of Cypress Cemetery	February 24, 2000 (#00000140)	0.25 miles north of Jackson Rd. on the eastern side of Dowdy Rd., north of Little Cypress Creek; 34°50′53″N 87°43′19″W	Florence	
13	Karsner-Carroll House	Karsner-Carroll House	March 31, 1970 (#70000104)	303 N. Pine St. 34°48′05″N 87°40′43″W	Florence	
14	William Koger House		July 9, 1986 (#86001542)	Smithsonia-Rhodesville Rd. 34°49′19″N 87°52′25″W	Smithsonia	
15	Larimore House		November 21, 1974 (#74000416)	Mars Hill Rd./U.S. Route 8, Box 344; 34°50′49″N 87°39′36″W	Florence	Burned July 19, 2018, subsequently demolished.
16	Maud Lindsay Free Kindergarten		October 18, 2019 (#100001877)	227 Enterprise St. 34°48′27″N 87°38′59″W	Florence	
17	Locust Street Historic District	Locust Street Historic District	October 3, 2002 (#02001065)	Roughly bounded by Pine St., College St., Locust St., and Irvine Ave. 34°48′08″N 87°40′47″W	Florence	
18	James Martin House	James Martin House	December 9, 1981 (#81000128)	1400 Cypress Mill Rd. 34°48′56″N 87°42′12″W	Florence	
19	McFarland Heights		July 10, 2017 (#100001280)	501-920 Riverview Dr., 701-735 Pleasant Cir., 410-456 Riverview Cir. 34°47′32″N 87°40′57″W	Florence	
20	Old Natchez Trace (310-2A)	Old Natchez Trace (310-2A)	November 7, 1976 (#76000156)	15 miles northwest of Florence on State Route 20; 34°55′31″N 87°50′38″W	Florence	1,250-foot segment of the Natchez Trace, both paved and unpaved.
21	Governor Robert Patton House	Governor Robert Patton House	June 17, 1976 (#76000335)	Sweetwater and Florence Boulevard; 34°49′28″N 87°38′34″W	Florence	
22	Rogers Department Store	Rogers Department Store	August 14, 1998 (#98001025)	117 N. Court St. 34°48′03″N 87°40′36″W	Florence	
23	Rosenbaum House	Rosenbaum House	December 19, 1978 (#78000492)	601 Riverview Dr. 34°47′35″N 87°40′50″W	Florence	
24	Sannoner Historic District	Sannoner Historic District	January 1, 1976 (#76000336)	Includes both sides of N. Pine and N. Court from Tuscaloosa Ave. to the University of North Alabama campus 34°48′14″N 87°40′45″W	Florence	
25	Seminary-O'Neal Historic District	Seminary-O'Neal Historic District	February 17, 1995 (#95000092)	Roughly Seminary St. between Hermitage Dr. and Irvine Ave. and Irvine between Seminary and Wood Ave. 34°48′20″N 87°40′39″W	Florence	
26	Seven Mile Island Archeological District		April 16, 1979 (#79003352)	Address Restricted; 34°45′02″N 87°44′12″W	Florence	
27	Southall Drugs	Southall Drugs	August 21, 1980 (#80000699)	201 N. Court St. 34°48′04″N 87°40′37″W	Florence	
28	Walnut Street Historic District	Walnut Street Historic District	December 12, 1976 (#76000337)	N. Walnut between Hermitage and Tuscaloosa; also 415-609 N. Poplar St. (odd numbers only); also the junction of Poplar and Tuscaloosa Sts. 34°48′20″N 87°40′28″W	Florence	Second and third sets of boundaries represent boundary increases of April 4, 1993 and March 16, 1996 respectively
29	Water Tower	Water Tower	April 28, 1980 (#80000700)	Seymore St. 34°49′29″N 87°41′27″W	Florence	
30	Wesleyan Hall	Wesleyan Hall	June 20, 1974 (#74000417)	Morrison Ave. 34°48′32″N 87°40′45″W	Florence	
31	Wilson Dam	Wilson Dam	November 13, 1966 (#66000147)	On the Tennessee River along State Route 133; 34°48′03″N 87°37′33″W	Florence	Extends into Colbert County
32	Wilson Park Houses	Wilson Park Houses	January 25, 1979 (#79000390)	209, 217, and 223 E. Tuscaloosa St. 34°48′14″N 87°40′31″W	Florence	
33	Wood Avenue Historic District	Wood Avenue Historic District	October 10, 1978 (#78000493)	N. Wood Ave. roughly bounded by Tuscaloosa and Hawthorne Sts.; also roughly along E. Hawthorne, Meridian and Kendrick Sts.; also roughly along Kendrick Ave. and 633 Hermitage Dr. 34°48′26″N 87°40′37″W	Florence	Second and third sets of boundaries represent boundary increases of March 16, 1996 and August 3, 1997 respectively

== See also ==
- List of National Historic Landmarks in Alabama
- National Register of Historic Places listings in Alabama
