= Properties on the Alabama Register of Landmarks and Heritage by county (Jefferson–Macon) =

This is a list of properties on the Alabama Register of Landmarks and Heritage, sorted alphabetically by county. This list contains all entries for Jefferson County through Macon County, the other listings may be found here. The Alabama Register of Landmarks and Heritage is an official listing of buildings, sites, structures, objects, and districts deemed worthy of preservation in the U.S. state of Alabama.

These properties, which may be of national, state, and local significance, are designated by the Alabama Historical Commission, under the authority of the Alabama Legislature. General criteria for inclusion in the Alabama Register includes that the property is at least 40 years old; is associated with events of state or local significance; is associated with the lives of persons of state or local significance; is representative of a type, style, or period of architecture; or is associated with Alabama's history or prehistory. It must also possess integrity of location and construction and convey a feeling for the time and place of construction.

The Alabama Register occasionally includes properties that do not meet the general criteria for inclusion, such as moved or reconstructed structures. These properties are included when they have been sensitively relocated to a site similar to the original, closely match the construction of the original significant building, or are of exceptional importance to the state.

There are approximately 1,711 properties and districts listed on the Alabama Register. Of these, approximately 243 are also listed on the National Register of Historic Places (NRHP) and 6 are designated as National Historic Landmarks (NHL).

Jefferson – Lamar – Lauderdale – Lawrence – Lee – Limestone – Lowndes – Macon – See also – References

This list is complete through the most recent Alabama Historical Commission listings, posted January 8, 2025.

== Jefferson County ==
	Site name	Date listed	City or Town	Built or Established	NRHP/NHL
1	23rd Street Missionary Baptist Church	March 13, 2016	Birmingham	c. 1930	
2	Adams House	May 25, 1976	Birmingham	1908–09	
3	Alabama Theatre and pipe organ	February 15, 1977	Birmingham	c. 1927	NRHP
4	Margaret Anderson House	September 30, 1999	Birmingham	c. 1842	
5	Arthur Harold Parker High School	May 19, 2011	Birmingham	c. 1927	
6	Barbigale Apartments	November 16, 2024	Vestavia Hills	c. 1959	
7	Barnett-Tannahill Sutton House	May 19, 1978	Birmingham	c. 1908	
8	Jonathan W. Bass House	September 26, 2003	Leeds	c. 1863	NRHP
9	Beaumont House	May 12, 1976	Birmingham	c. 1850	
10	Bessemer Public Library	July 6, 1978	Bessemer	1907	
11	Bethel AME Church	August 5, 2010	Birmingham	1907	
12	Bethel Baptist Church	November 13, 1996	Birmingham	Early 20th century	NHL
13	Bivens Chapel Cemetery	December 19, 1991	Brookside	c. 1836	
14	Black Creek Bridge	July 16, 1976	Fultondale	1926	
15	Blessed Sacrament Catholic Church	December 16, 2010	Birmingham	c. 1929	NRHP
16	Blossburg Hollow Coke Ovens	September 14, 1977	Adamsville vicinity	1889	
17	Bridge Over The Little Cahaba River	August 6, 1993	Birmingham	1905	
18	Brookside Negro School	December 19, 2019	Brookside	c. 1925	
19	Brock's Gap	July 15, 2021	Hoover	c. 1863	
20	Camp Coleman	June 21, 2012	Trussville	c. 1925	
21	Camp Fletcher	March 29, 2018	Bessemer	c. 1921	
22	Chamblee-Sterne House	November 30, 1977	Birmingham	c. 1830	
23	City Federation of Colored Women Club House	July 29, 1977	Birmingham	1899	
24	Coe House	July 21, 1977	Birmingham	1908	
25	Colored Memorial Park	March 8, 2023	Birmingham	c. 1941	
26	Ann Susan Hale Copeland House	August 25, 1994	Hoover	1908	
27	Angela Y. Davis House	October 7, 1998	Birmingham	c. 1896	
28	Dobbins Building	March 24, 1995	Birmingham	1905	
29	Donnelly House	May 20, 1975	Birmingham	c. 1905	
30	Drenner-Rich House	April 29, 1977	Birmingham	c. 1903	
31	Dunbar High School	February 19, 1988	Bessemer	1922	NRHP
32	Edgewood Terrace	September 12, 2019	Homewood	1940	
33	Ellard-Thomas House	April 11, 1984	Birmingham	1928–29	
34	Elliott House	January 24, 2008	Trussville	c. 1898	
35	Engle-Armstrong House	November 17, 1995	Birmingham	1937	
36	Finley Roundhouse	November 9, 2017	Birmingham	c. 1915	
37	Five-Mile Creek Bridge at Bivens Chapel	March 19, 1976	Brookside vicinity	1906–10	
38	Forest Park District	September 13, 1978	Birmingham	1906	NRHP
39	Fowler-Woods House	December 4, 1992	Birmingham	1892	
40	Full Gospel Fellowship Church	June 27, 2019	Pinson	1923	
41	Gates-Ballew House	June 30, 1995	Homewood	1925	
42	Gilmore Stadium	November 9, 2017	Hueytown	c. 1935	
43	Graham Cemetery	February 2, 2001	Mount Olive	1880	
44	Guild Hall (Edgewater United Methodist Church)	March 22, 1991	Edgewater	1914	
45	Hale House	March 8, 1994	Hoover	1910	
46	Happy Hollow District Bridge in Civitan Park	March 19, 1986	Trussville	1909	
47	Hill-Winston House	November 16, 2024	Birmingham	c. 1923	
48	Hollywood Gardens Apartments	November 16, 2024	Homewood	c. 1960	
49	Holy Cross Passionist Community of Alabama	May 19, 2023	Birmingham	c. 1943	
50	Holy Family Hospital	January 24, 2008	Birmingham	c. 1954	
51	Holy Rosary Catholic Church	May 12, 1976	Birmingham	1889	
52	Hoover House	August 3, 1990	Hoover	1948–50	
53	Judge H. R. Howze House	July 21, 1977	Birmingham		
54	Ruth J. Jackson Cottage	May 17, 1977	Birmingham	1900	
55	Johnston's Log Cabin	November 13, 1996	Birmingham	c. 1925	
56	Mortimer Jordan House	July 21, 1977	Birmingham	1906	
57	Lawler Cemetery	February 25, 1999	Dora	1812	
58	Legion Field	June 14, 2018	Birmingham	1927	
59	Loeb-Crowe House	August 6, 1976	Birmingham	1913–14	
60	Lot 4 Hamilton's Additions	April 19, 2006	Birmingham	c. 1902	
61	A. B. Loveman House	July 21, 1977	Birmingham	1906	
62	J. Loveman House	July 21, 1977	Birmingham	1908	
63	Macedonia Seventeen Street Baptist Church	September 25, 2008	Birmingham		
64	Hugh Martin Cottage	April 11, 1984	Birmingham	1920–21	
65	McDaniel House	October 27, 1975	Birmingham	c. 1870	
66	McKinstry Family House	February 12, 2015	Birmingham	c. 1952	
67	Miles Memorial College Historic District	March 19, 1993	Fairfield	1907–42	NRHP
68	Morrow House	July 21, 1977	Birmingham	1910	
69	Mt. Hebron School	April 1, 2010	Leeds	1915–1916	
70	Oak Hill Cemetery and Pioneer Memorial Chapel	October 27, 1975	Birmingham	1871	NRHP
71	Parham Apothecary Building	November 17, 1995	Fairfield	1947	NRHP
72	Park Avenue Historic District	October 7, 1998	Hoover	c. 1900-1983	
73	Pinson School	April 21, 1999	Pinson	1919–21	
74	Pratt City Carline Historic District	February 19, 1988	Birmingham	c. 1891-1928	NRHP
75	Queenstown	December 16, 2010	Trussville	c. 1930	
76	Rickwood Field	December 19, 1991	Birmingham	1910	NRHP
77	Rock Manor	June 10, 1976	Vestavia Hills	1925	
78	Roebuck Springs Historic District	May 7, 1987	Birmingham	c. 1907-1949	NRHP
79	Rowan House	February 2, 2001	Leeds	c. 1904–05	
80	Sandusky School	July 29, 1992	Birmingham		
81	Shades Crest Road Historic District	November 13, 1996	Hoover	19th century	
82	Shook-Wikstrom House	July 21, 1977	Birmingham	1906	
83	Simon-Buck House	November 17, 1995	Birmingham	1930	
84	Sixteenth Street Baptist Church	June 16, 1976	Birmingham	1911	NHL
85	Snow–Rogers House	March 29, 2012	Morris	c. 1898	
86	Superintendent's House (demolished 7/2021)	July 15, 2021	Irondale	c. 1915	
87	Stacey House	May 6, 2020	Wylam	c. 1898	
88	Stonecroft	July 22, 1991	Hoover	c. 1821	NRHP
89	Temple of Sibyl	October 28, 1985	Vestavia Hills	1924–25	
90	The Overseer's House	September 28, 2000	Hoover	c. 1889	
91	The Sweet House	November 15, 2007	Bessemer	c. 1906	
92	Thomas Historic District	February 19, 1988	Birmingham	c. 1900-1952	NRHP
93	Thompson House	July 21, 1977	Birmingham	c. 1910	
94	Myrtle Lee Tinsley Home	October 31, 2013	Birmingham	c. 1952	
95	Turkey Creek Archaeological Historic District	January 15, 1999	Pinson vicinity	c. 1827	
96	Union Baptist Church	April 11, 1984	Lipscomb	1922	
97	Virginia Mines	April 14, 1978	Hueytown vicinity	c. 1902	
98	Waverly Place Historic District	September 3, 2020	Birmingham	1900-1950	
99	Wheeler House	March 29, 2012	Hoover	c. 1927	
100	Whitehead-Falls House	October 17, 1980	Birmingham	1913	
101	Wilson-Chapel Methodist Church	February 25, 1980	Birmingham	1917	
102	Wood Family Cemetery	January 25, 1977	Birmingham	1890	
103	Woodlawn City Hall	November 23, 1976	Birmingham	Early 20th century	NRHP
104	Zanaty Realty, Inc. Office	January 14, 1980	Birmingham	c. 1904	

== Lamar County ==
	Site name	Date listed	City or Town	Built or Established	NRHP/NHL
1	Clearman Farms	April 1, 2010	Vernon	c. 1872	
2	Dick Mixon Farm	August 5, 2010	Beaverton	c. 1899	
3	Kennedy Colored School Site	September 3, 2020	Kennedy	c. 1937	
4	Lamar County Training School Vocational Building	March 24, 2022	Vernon	1937	
5	Ogden House	March 5, 1976	Sulligent	1888	
6	West Alabama Ford	December 19, 2019	Sulligent	1926	
7	Dr. Thomas Bailey Woods Place	November 13, 1978	Sulligent vicinity	c. 1890	

== Lauderdale County ==
	Site name	Date listed	City or Town	Built or Established	NRHP/NHL
1	Abstract Building	January 29, 1981	Florence	c. 1905	
2	Armistead House	October 11, 1978	Florence	c. 1818	NRHP
3	Ashcraft-Ingram House	April 11, 1984	Florence	1859	
4	Dr. L.E. Bayles House	January 31, 1979	Anderson	c. 1915	
5	College Place Historic District	July 29, 1992	Florence	1880s	NRHP
6	Crossland-Smith House	October 12, 1976	Florence	1889	
7	Dowdy Homestead	August 3, 1990	Florence	c. 1840	
8	East Florence Historic District	February 15, 1977	Florence	1880–1930	
9	Florence Indian Mound ("Wawmanone")	April 11, 1984	Florence	Mississippian	
10	Forks of Cypress (burned down 1966)	April 14, 1992	Florence vicinity	c. 1826-1932	NRHP
11	Fuqua Place	November 26, 1978	Rogersville vicinity	1836	
12	Gaskins Building	February 6, 1998	Florence	c. 1918	
13	Hall-Westmoreland Home	October 21, 1971	Florence	c. 1900	
14	W. C. Handy Home and Birthplace	March 11, 1976	Florence	c. 1870	
15	Aristides Jackson House	January 31, 1979	Elgin	c. 1840	
16	Kennedy-Douglass House	May 11, 1976	Florence	1918	NRHP
17	Killen Elementary School	October 7, 1998	Killen	c. 1935	
18	Lamar Building	March 30, 1989	Florence	1887	
19	Lauderdale County Jackson’s Military Road Historic District	November 13, 1996	county-wide	1817	
20	Leftwich-Dillard House	October 12, 1976	Florence	1888	
21	Littleton-Holt Log Cabin	March 29, 1977	Cloverdale	c. 1818	
22	Lock No. 3 of Muscle Shoals Canal	May 26, 1986	Killen vicinity	1831	
23	Mapleton (George Coulter House)	October 19, 1979	Florence	1820	NRHP
24	Mars Hill Church of Christ	May 20, 1981	Florence	1904	
25	Martin-Bounds House	October 19, 1979	Florence	1843–60	NRHP
26	Moody House	November 26, 1978	Bailey Springs	c. 1893	
27	Morrison-Ellis House	November 15, 2012	Florence	c. 1895	
28	Neon signs at the Coca-Cola Bottling Co.	August 3, 1990	Florence	1949	
29	Norfolk Southern Railroad Bridge	August 16, 1991	Florence vicinity	1870s	
30	Old Florence Water Tower	October 19, 1979	Florence	Late 19th century	NRHP
31	Pope's Tavern	September 14, 1977	Florence	Early 19th century	
32	Reisman-Coffee House	October 12, 1976	Florence	c. 1900	
33	Rogers Department Store	August 25, 1994	Florence	1894–1944	NRHP
34	St. Florian Historic District	September 26, 2007	St. Florian	c. 1873-1960	
35	Simpson-Wood House	October 12, 1976	Florence	c. 1830	
36	Wesley Chapel United Methodist Church Cemetery	March 19, 1993	Florence	1819	
37	Westmoreland BSA Camp	September 26, 2007	Florence	c. 1929	
38	Wilson Park Historic District	May 17, 1977	Florence	19th century	
39	Wood Avenue Historic District	May 9, 1978	Florence	1880s–1930	NRHP

== Lawrence County ==
	Site name	Date listed	City or Town	Built or Established	NRHP/NHL
1	Albemarle	May 26, 1986	Courtland vicinity	c. 1821	
2	Alexander House	September 16, 2021	Moulton	1936	
3	Boxwood Plantation Dependency (Brick Slave Cabin)	August 25, 2011	Hillsboro vicinity	c. 1854	NRHP
4	Bride's Hill (Sunnybrook)	April 16, 1985	Wheeler	c. 1828	NRHP
5	Byrd Log House	March 22, 1991	Courtland vicinity	c. 1829-1840	
6	Courtland Historic District	December 15, 1989	Courtland	c. 1818-1819	NRHP
7	Frank Davis Home and School	March 18, 2021	North Courtland	c. 1915, c. 1970	
8	High Town Path Historic District	November 17, 1995	Bankhead National Forest		
9	Thomas Holland House	March 22, 1991	Hillsboro	c. 1836	NRHP
10	Dr. Robert Price Irwin House	March 20, 2003	Moulton	1907	
11	Jesseton Post Office	July 15, 2021	Danville	c. 1830; 1950	
12	Kinlock Historic District	November 17, 1995	Bankhead National Forest	c. 1827-1930s	
13	Leetch House	July 29, 1992	Moulton	c. 1820	
14	Liberty Hall/Littrell House & Cemetery	March 8, 2023	Moulton	c. 1932	
15	Masterson's Mill Site	May 23, 1988	Moulton vicinity	1870s	
16	Oakville Indian Mounds and Cemetery	May 3, 2001	Oakville	Woodland	
17	Pine Torch Log Church	August 19, 1996	Moulton vicinity	c. 1808	
18	Tennessee Valley School	May 10, 2000	Hillsboro	1921–25	
19	The Barbour Shop	August 24, 2022	Moulton	c. 1945	
20	The Hot Spot	June 27, 2019	Moulton	c. 1945	

== Lee County ==
	Site name	Date listed	City or Town	Built or Established	NRHP/NHL
1	Antioch Methodist Church	March 23, 1990	Salem	c. 1837; 1904	
2	Antioch Missionary Baptist Church	August 18, 2022	Opelika	1967; 1988	
3	Auburn AME Zion Church	August 18, 2022	Auburn	1946; 1980s	
4	Auburn Depot	January 25, 1977	Auburn	1904	
5	Bean's Mill	October 1, 1997	Opelika	1870s–1930s	
6	Auburn University Fisheries Research Units (Lower Ponds)	February 15, 1977	Auburn vicinity	1940	
7	Baptist Hill Cemetery	January 12, 1994	Auburn	1870s	
8	Bedell-Triplett House	September 6, 1984	Opelika	1905	
9	Buchanan-Clegg House	November 13, 1996	Opelika vicinity	1840	
10	Burton House (Moved from Auburn in July 1993)	January 29, 1980	Opelika	1885	NRHP
11	Dr. J.W. Darden House	March 25, 2004	Opelika	1904	NRHP
12	Ensminger House	April 11, 1984	Gold Hill	1840s	
13	Ferguson Chapel C.M.E. Church	March 24, 2022	Opelika	c. 1901; 1917; 1957	
14	Greater Ebenezer Missionary Baptist Church and Cemetery	April 30, 2020	Salem	1923; 1963; 1968	
15	G.W. Carver Hall (The VFW Post Building)	March 24, 2022	Opelika	1929; 1972	
16	Halliday-Cary-Pick House	June 19, 1976	Auburn	1848	
17	Bob and Fannie Harris Plantation	March 8, 2023	Auburn	c. 1940	
18	Houston-Dunn House (Old Askew Hotel)	March 25, 2004	Salem	c. 1837	
19	Jones Store	August 27, 2020	Smiths Station	1909	
20	Kinnebrew-Middlebrooks-Newell House	June 19, 1996	Waverly vicinity	1830	
21	Lake Condy	February 6, 1998	Opelika	1878	
22	Lane House (Auburn Women's Club)	December 19, 1991	Auburn	1853	
23	Dr. Andrew D. McLain Office and Drug Store	January 4, 1981	Salem	Late 19th century	NRHP
24	Mitchell–Whatley Mill and Dam	October 9, 2014	Auburn	c. 1905	
25	Mt. Zion United Methodist Church	June 18, 2015	Smiths Station	c. 1908	
26	"Old Nancy" (tractor) at Auburn University	April 14, 1978	Auburn	1905	
27	Pine Hill Cemetery	January 31, 1978	Auburn	Late 1830s	
28	"Pinetucket" (Foster Home)	May 25, 1977	Auburn	1850	
29	Ridge Grove Missionary Baptist Church	May 3, 2001	Opelika vicinity	1912	
30	Roxana United Methodist Church and Cemetery	April 18, 2007	Roxana	1842–1904	
31	Saint Luke A.M.E. Church	March 24, 2022	Opelika	1901; 1960	
32	Salem-Shotwell Covered Bridge (Pea Ridge Covered Bridge)	January 25, 1977	Salem vicinity	1900	
33	Samford-Brown House	April 11, 1984	Opelika	c. 1900	
34	Shivers-Rhodes House	January 29, 1980	Opelika	c. 1859	
35	St. Paul United Methodist Church	March 21, 2024	Opelika	c. 1944	
36	Eli Stroud Cemetery	October 1, 1997	Smiths Station vicinity	1861	
37	Summers-Cooper House	March 23, 1990	Opelika	1837	NRHP
38	Sunny Slope	June 27, 2007	Auburn	c. 1857-1935	NRHP
39	Thompson Chapel A.M.E. Zion Church	October 19, 1979	Opelika	c. 1878; 1911	
40	Webster House	May 28, 2009	Auburn	c. 1832	

== Limestone County ==
	Site name	Date listed	City or Town	Built or Established	NRHP/NHL
1	Athens Courthouse Square Historic District	August 23, 2012	Athens	c. 1836, 1888, 1945	NRHP
2	Barksdale-Looney House	October 25, 2018	Athens	c. 1839	
3	Blackburn-Mastich House	June 27, 1983	Athens vicinity	c. 1873	NRHP
4	Bullington House	March 12, 1997	Athens	1910	
5	Cambridge United Methodist Church	October 7, 1998	Athens	c. 1818	
6	Dogwood Flat School	February 6, 1998	Tanner	1948	
7	Eddins House	November 2, 1990	Ardmore	1808–10	NRHP
8	Elkmont Depot	March 11, 1976	Elkmont	1886	
9	Flower Hill Farm	January 22, 2009		c. 1856	
10	Fort Henderson Site/Trinity Congregation Church Complex	May 14, 1993	Athens	1865	
11	Founders Hall, Athens State University	May 12, 1976	Athens	1842–44	NRHP
12	Gamble House	March 18, 2021	Tanner	c. 1820	
13	Hines Hobbs Cemetery	June 25, 2002	Athens	c. 1852	
14	Little Elk School	March 12, 1997	Athens	1939	
15	Mt. Nebo Cumberland Presbyterian Church (Nebo Community Church) and Cemetery	June 18, 2015	Jones Crossroads	c. 1912 (2012)	
16	Southeast Air Forces Training Center	December 16, 2010	Tanner	c. 1941	
17	Walker-Kuykendall House	February 4, 1981	Athens	c. 1851	
18	West Limestone High School (Destroyed 2008)	March 12, 1986	Lester	1935	
19	Woodside (destroyed by fire in 2022)	October 19, 1979	Belle Mina	c. 1830–1900	NRHP

== Lowndes County ==
	Site name	Date listed	City or Town	Built or Established	NRHP/NHL
1	Campsite 2: Rosie Steele Complex	September 16, 2021	White Hall vicinity	1965	NRHP
2	Campsite 3: The Gardner Farm	September 16, 2021	Lowndesboro vicinity	c. 1924; 1965	NRHP
3	County Jail	September 30, 1999	Hayneville	1958	
4	Crosby Water System	June 21, 2012	Gordonville	c. 1955, 1963	
5	First Missionary Baptist Church	March 29, 2012	Hayneville	c. 1959	
6	Holy Ground Battle Site	May 26, 1976	White Hall vicinity	1813	
7	Hopewell Baptist Church	November 19, 2015	Mount Willing	c. 1843	
8	Lamar Memorial United Methodist Church	March 20, 1981	Letohatchee	1869	
9	Lowndesboro Colored School	May 19, 2011	Lowndesboro	c. 1890	
10	Mather-Easterly House	September 28, 2000	Hayneville	c. 1847	
11	Mt. Gillard Baptist Church and Cemetery	September 26, 2003	White Hall vicinity	c. 1901–03	
12	Mt. Willing Baptist Church and Cemetery	November 9, 2015	Mount Willing	c. 1888–89	
13	Mt. Zion Elementary School (Mt. Zion School)	November 2, 1990	White Hall	1923	
14	Old Hayneville Baptist Church	May 10, 2000	Hayneville	1890	
15	Ramah Baptist Church	September 30, 1999	Calhoun	1904	
16	Alex and Annie Rives Home	February 21, 2012	White Hall	c. 1959	
17	Salem Christian Church	December 15, 2011	Letohatchee	c. 1876	
18	SNCC Freedom House Complex	September 30, 1999	White Hall	c. 1900, 1958	
19	Snow Cemetery	September 12, 1988	White Hall vicinity	c. 1819	
20	Somerville-Harrell House	November 2, 1990	Pleasant Hill vicinity		
21	Tent City Site	September 30, 1999	White Hall	c. 1965	
22	The Tyson Home (The Pillars)	December 9, 2021	Lowndesboro	c. 1856	NRHP
23	Viola Liuzzo Memorial Site	March 8, 2023	Lowndesboro	March 25, 1965	
24	James Spullock Williamson House (Merry Oaks Farm)	September 12, 1988	Sandy Ridge	c. 1860	NRHP

== Macon County ==
	Site name	Date listed	City or Town	Built or Established	NRHP/NHL
1	Amelia Boynton Robinson Residence	November 16, 2024	Tuskegee	c. 1959	
2	Armstrong Church	March 11, 1976	Notasulga	1856	
3	Bartram Trail	No info.	Tuskegee National Forest	1775–76	
4	Butler Chapel A.M.E. Zion Church	April 16, 1985	Tuskegee	1887	NRHP
5	Camp Watts	July 29, 1992	Notasulga vicinity	c. 1861	
6	Creekwood	February 15, 1977	Creek Stand	1840	NRHP
7	Fort Davis Depot	August 10, 2017	Fort Davis	c. 1904	
8	Hardaway Baptist Church (Ebenezer Baptist Church)	October 19, 1979	Hardaway	1845, 1895	
9	Harris Barrett School	September 20, 2006	Franklin	c. 1903	
10	Macon County Training School and Community Historic District	November 19, 2015	Franklin	c. 1927–1977	
11	Notasulga High School	February 21, 2019	Notasulga	1935, 1965, 1993	NRHP
12	Shiloh Missionary Baptist Church, Rosenwald School, and Cemetery	September 20, 2006	Notasulga	c. 1902, 1914, 1922	
13	G. C. Thompson House (Moved to Montgomery)	January 14, 1980	Tuskegee	1855	
14	Tuskegee Public School Gymnasium	February 20, 2014	Tuskegee	c. 1939	
15	Tuskegee Veterans Administration Medical Center	April 14, 1992	Tuskegee	c. 1923	NRHP
16	Woodward-Bledsoe (The Annex) (demolished)	August 31, 1982	Tuskegee	1835	

== See also ==
- Properties on the Alabama Register of Landmarks and Heritage by county (Autauga–Choctaw)
- Properties on the Alabama Register of Landmarks and Heritage by county (Clarke–Dallas)
- Properties on the Alabama Register of Landmarks and Heritage by county (DeKalb–Jackson)
- Properties on the Alabama Register of Landmarks and Heritage by county (Madison–Perry)
- Properties on the Alabama Register of Landmarks and Heritage by county (Pickens–Winston)
