= Cherry Street Historic District =

Cherry Street Historic District (or variations) may refer to:

- Cherry Street Historic District (Florence, Alabama), listed on the NRHP
- Cherry Street Historic District (Helena-West Helena, Arkansas), listed on the NRHP
- South Cherry Street Historic District (Greenville, Kentucky), listed on the NRHP
- East Main Street-Cherry Street Historic District, Spencer, Massachusetts, listed on the NRHP
- South Cherry Street Historic District (Vicksburg, Mississippi), listed on the NRHP
- Cherry Street Colonnades Historic District, Kansas City, Missouri, listed on the NRHP
- North Cherry Street Historic District (Kernersville, North Carolina), listed on the NRHP
- North Cherry Street Historic District (Winston-Salem, North Carolina), listed on the NRHP
