= Donnelly House =

Donnelly House may refer to:

- Donnelly House and Gardens (Birmingham, Alabama), on the National Register of Historic Places (NRHP)
- Donnelly House (Mount Dora, Florida), on the NRHP
- Bartholomew J. Donnelly House, Daytona Beach, Florida, on the NRHP
- Daniel Donnelly House, Williamsport, Maryland, on the NRHP
- Donnelly House (New Lebanon, New York), on the NRHP
