= Locust Street Historic District =

Locust Street Historic District may refer to:

- Locust Street, a major street in Center City Philadelphia
- Locust Street Historic District (Florence, Alabama), listed on the National Register of Historic Places in Lauderdale County, Alabama
- Locust Street Historic District (Washington, Missouri), listed on the National Register of Historic Places in Franklin County, Missouri
