= Koger =

Koger may refer to:

== People with the surname ==
- Alan Koger (born 1987), American soccer player
- Ann Koger (born 1950), American tennis coach
- Dániel Kóger (born 1989), Hungarian ice hockey player
- Gregory Koger (born 1970s), American political scientist
- Jeremiah Koger, American football player
- Kevin Koger (born 1989), American football player

== Places ==
- Koger Center for the Arts, arts center in South Carolina, U.S.
- William Koger House (Smithsonia, Alabama), historic house in Alabama, U.S.
- William Koger House (Waxahachie, Texas), historic house in Texas, U.S.
