= William Koger House =

William Koger House may refer to:

- William Koger House (Smithsonia, Alabama), listed on the National Register of Historic Places in Lauderdale County, Alabama
- William Koger House (Waxahachie, Texas), listed on the National Register of Historic Places in Ellis County, Texas
