= Walnut Street Historic District (Florence, Alabama) =

Historic district in Alabama, United States

- U.S. National Register of Historic Places
- U.S. Historic district
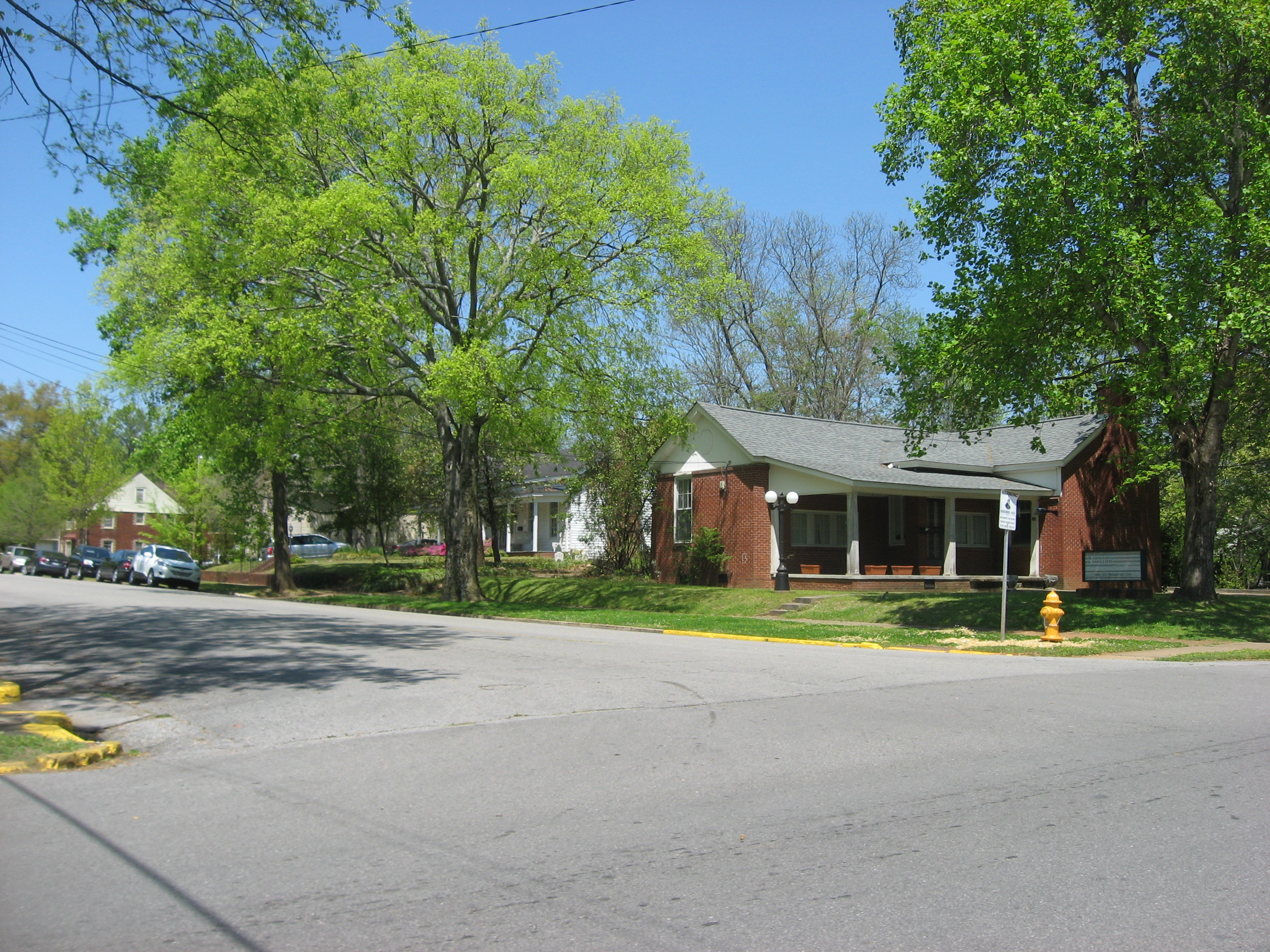
- The corner of Poplar and Tuscaloosa Streets in April 2014

- Location within Alabama Location within the United States
- Location: N. Walnut between Hermitage and Tuscaloosa; also 415-609 N. Poplar St. (odd numbers only); also the junction of Poplar and Tuscaloosa Sts., Florence, Alabama
- Coordinates: 34°48′20″N 87°40′28″W
- Area: 21.5 acres (8.7 ha)
- Architectural style: Colonial Revival, Bungalow/Craftsman, Late Victorian
- NRHP reference No.: 76000337 (original); 92001836 (increase 1); 96000021 (increase 2)

Significant dates
- Added to NRHP: December 12, 1976
- Boundary increases: March 4, 1993; February 16, 1996

The Walnut Street Historic District is a historic district in Florence, Alabama. Development of the neighborhood began in earnest in the 1890s, although the oldest house in the district dates from 1870. Florence's first economic boom after the Civil War began in the 1880s, and the newly minted upper-middle class began building homes to the east of older residential sections, such as Wood Avenue and the Sannoner District. The economy cooled in the 1900s and 1910s, only to pick up again in the 1920s with the construction of Wilson Dam and several textile mills.

Houses in the district represent three major types: the earliest constructed are the largest, and have Victorian and Classical Revival details; many houses from the early 1900s are cottages with either Victorian or California bungalow influences; and later 1920s and 1930s homes are usually two-story brick structures with Georgian influences.

The district was listed on the National Register of Historic Places in 1976, and its boundaries were increased in 1993 and 1996.
