= Gregory Koger =

- Born: c. 1970s
- Occupation: Political scientist
- Known for: Filibustering: A Political History of Obstruction in the House and Senate

Gregory Koger (born c. 1970s) is a political scientist in the United States, specializing in the study of filibustering and obstructionism in American legislative bodies.

== Biography ==
Koger was a legislative assistant to Congressman George R. Nethercutt. In that position, he served as a political advisor on a variety of issues, assisted in drafting legislation, and as a liaison to the Appropriations Subcommittee on Defense.

He received his Ph.D. from UCLA in 2002. He is the author of Filibustering: A Political History of Obstruction in the House and Senate, and is currently an assistant professor at the University of Miami.

=== Works ===
- Koger, Gregory (2010). Filibustering: A Political History of Obstruction in the House and Senate. Chicago: University of Chicago. ISBN 978-0-226-44964-7. OCLC 455871593.

== See also ==
- Steven S. Smith
