= Selma to Montgomery march campsites =

Map of the Selma to Montgomery marches route showing campsite locations

Participants in the Selma to Montgomery march on March 21–25, 1965, utilized four campsites along the route. The march followed a 54-mile (87 km) route along U.S. Highway 80 from Brown Chapel A.M.E. Church in Selma through Lowndes County to the State Capitol in Montgomery. Lowndes County had earned the nickname "Bloody Lowndes" due to anti-Black violence, and was particularly symbolic for the march organizers. Leaders with the Southern Christian Leadership Conference (SCLC) sought Black landowners along the route as sympathetic to the goals of the march. Security was provided by the Alabama National Guard, however some marchers distrusted the White guardsmen, and volunteer security guards also patrolled the camps.

== Campsite 1: David Hall Farm ==
- Campsite 1: David Hall Farm
- Location: County Road 67, east of Selma, Alabama
- Coordinates: 32°19′31″N 86°56′57″W

After the first day, March 21, the marchers camped on the farm of David Hall, a Black landowner. Sleeping, medical, and food tents were erected on the farm, and march organizers used the nearby New Sister Spring Baptist Church as a meeting site. Many of the participants returned to Selma by car and bus from the Hall farm; due to Highway 80 narrowing to two lanes through Lowndes County, only 300 marchers were allowed along that portion of the route.

== Campsite 2: Rosie Steele Property ==
- Campsite 2: Rosie Steele Property
- U.S. National Register of Historic Places
- Alabama Register of Landmarks and Heritage
- Location: 5892-5876 Highway 80 W, near White Hall, Alabama
- Coordinates: 32°16′04″N 86°42′23″W
- NRHP reference No.: 100009549

Significant dates
- Added to NRHP: November 6, 2023
- Designated ARLH: September 16, 2021

On the night of March 22, the marchers camped on the property of Rosie Steele. Steele was a Black landowner, who acquired her property along Highway 80 near White Hall sometime between 1935 and 1940 and operated a general store. The store was especially profitable during World War II, and she eventually acquired 200 acres (81 ha) in Lowndes and Autauga Counties. Steele's property was chosen by SCLC leadership due to its location in Lowndes County, its proximity to Highway 80, and for being roughly halfway between campsites 1 & 3 (17 mi (27 km) and 13 mi (21 km) respectively).

On the night of the camp, two large sleeping tents, two service tents, portable restrooms, and a communications antenna were erected. Food was brought in, consisting of chili and crackers, tomatoes, fruit cocktail, bread, and cookies. Marchers also bought provisions from Rosie's son Roosevelt's service station across the highway. A short mass was held, led by Martin Luther King Jr. The next morning, breakfast was served and the marchers continued toward Montgomery.

Steele's house and store burned in 1967, and a new brick house was built in the 1970s. The site was listed on the National Register of Historic Places in 2023.

== Campsite 3: The Gardner Farm ==
- Campsite 3: The Gardner Farm
- U.S. National Register of Historic Places
- Alabama Register of Landmarks and Heritage
- Location: 2342 Frederick Douglass Rd., near Lowndesboro, Alabama
- Coordinates: 32°15′56″N 86°32′06″W
- NRHP reference No.: 100009120

Significant dates
- Added to NRHP: July 12, 2023
- Designated ARLH: September 16, 2021

The third night of the march, March 23, was hosted on the farm of Robert and Mary Gardner, on the south side of Highway 80 east of Lowndesboro. The land was owned by Robert's grandfather, Hugh A. Carson, a member of the Alabama House of Representatives who was born a slave and was one of only three Black delegates to Alabama's 1875 constitutional convention. The family house was built circa 1900–1912, with additions in the 1940s and 1955. The farm was suggested as a campsite to march organizers by Robert's brother-in-law A. G. Gaston.

The farm's driveway is located off a side road, now named Frederick Douglass Road. The two sleeping tents and medical tent were located north of the driveway, and the food tent was south of the driveway. The third day of the march progressed in a steady rain, and the camp was covered in deep mud. Marchers dried their clothes around portable heaters and ate dinner supplied by Tuskegee University students. The marchers departed at 7am the next morning, and soon crossed into Montgomery County.

The property remains in the Gardner family. The site was listed on the National Register of Historic Places in 2023.

== Campsite 4: City of St. Jude ==
The final night of the march, March 24, participants camped at the City of St. Jude, a Roman Catholic church, school, and hospital complex. Established in 1937, St. Jude was intended to be a social service center for Montgomery's Black community. When the hospital opened in 1951, it was the first fully integrated hospital in Alabama.

At St. Jude, the usual tents were erected, but marchers were also able to take advantage of the medical and other facilities. That evening, a "Stars for Freedom Rally" was held on the grounds, featuring performances by Harry Belafonte, Tony Bennett, Frankie Laine, Peter, Paul and Mary, Sammy Davis Jr., Joan Baez, and Nina Simone. On the morning of March 25, the marchers completed the final 4 miles (6.4 km) to the Capitol.

The City of St. Jude complex was listed on the National Register of Historic Places in 1990.

== See also ==
- Selma to Montgomery National Historic Trail
