= Finley Roundhouse =

Railway roundhouse in Birmingham, Alabama

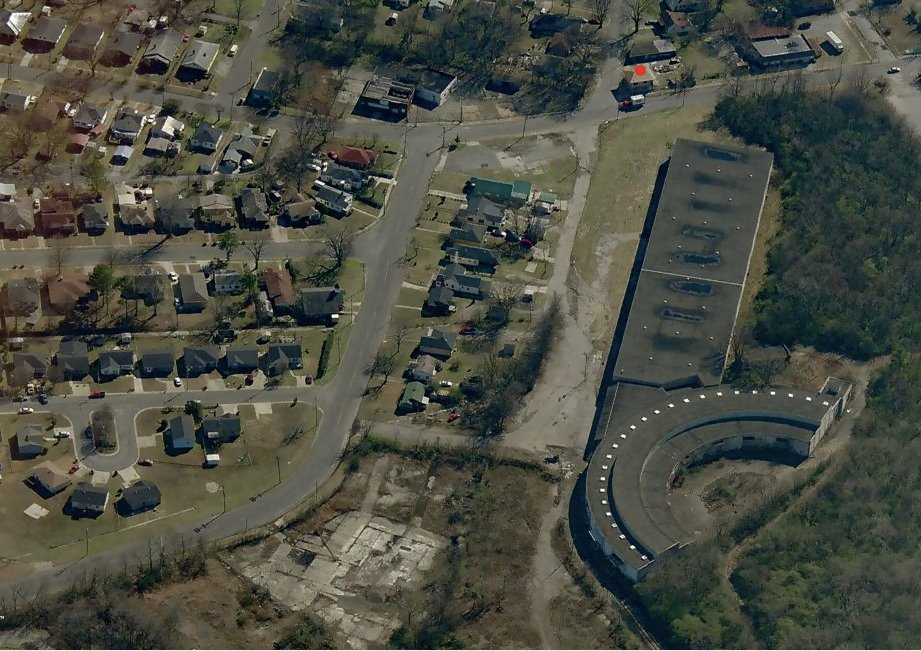
- Finley Roundhouse in 2013. Aerial view south with surrounding Acipco-Finley neighborhood.

- Location within Alabama
- 33°32′24.57″N 86°50′09.86″W
- Location: Birmingham, Alabama

History
- Built: 1915, 1952

Site notes
- Architect: Southern Railway (US)
- Architectural style: Railway roundhouse
- Owner: Norfolk Southern Railway

Alabama Register of Landmarks and Heritage
- Official name: Finley Roundhouse
- Designated: November 14, 2017

The Finley Roundhouse is a historic railway roundhouse located in the Acipco-Finley neighborhood of Birmingham, Alabama. It is one of the last two surviving railway roundhouses in the City of Birmingham and one of three surviving in the State of Alabama. It is also the largest reinforced concrete roundhouse in Alabama. It was built by the Southern Railway in 1915.

== History ==
The Southern Railway built the Finley Roundhouse in 1915 as part of its new Finley Yard facility on Birmingham's Northside. The Finley Yard was named in honor of former railway president William Wilson Finley (1853-1913). The railway began acquiring land in the North Birmingham area in 1912 for the new facility under Finley's supervision. There were a number of facilities on the railway's Alabama Great Southern Railroad mainline near Downtown Birmingham and these facilities were small and couldn't keep up with the growing industrial traffic propagated by the booming steel and iron industry, and the Southern planned to build a large flagship Alabama facility to keep abreast of the growth. The Finley Yard was commemorated on January 3, 1915. The roundhouse, along with a yard office and coaling tower, were among the first structures built in the new facility. The roundhouse was constructed of reinforced concrete with a tar and gravel roof and a shop floor made up of creosoted wood blocks over a 5-inch-thick (13 cm) concrete slab. It featured 25 engine berths arrayed around a 90-foot-diameter (27 m) open-air turntable and an elevated central section that included a double band of clerestory windows to illuminate the work area with natural lighting.

In 1924, the Finley Yard was expanded with new repair facilities and these facilities were opened on October 1, 1924, with a new machine shop and planing mill, among other structures. These new facilities were used to repair and overhaul steam locomotives in the Birmingham District and elsewhere in Alabama.

In 1928, the Finley Shops were among two Southern Railway facilities to build a replica of the 19th-century American steam locomotive, the Best Friend of Charleston, to commemorate the 100th anniversary of the Southern Railway's oldest predecessor, the South Carolina Canal and Railroad Company. The replica became the goodwill mascot of the railway and had toured the railway network from 1928 to 1986, and became owned by the Norfolk Southern Railway on exhibition in Atlanta, Georgia, who returned it to the city of Charleston, South Carolina, in 2013.

The Finley Yards were decommissioned and dismantled and the railway moved operations to the new Ernest E. Norris Yard in Irondale, Alabama. in 1952. The initial site was reduced and allotted to the Birmingham Food Terminal Company, the Alabama Farmers Market, and other local companies.

The Finley Roundhouse was leased by the railway over the years to local companies and was used for cold storage, furniture warehousing, and other functions. The Roundhouse received alterations, of which the most significant was the addition of a rectangular warehouse attached to the south of the roundhouse. A rail spur was added from the railyard to connect the rear of the roundhouse and the warehouse annex. The Norfolk Southern Railway ended the leasing of the Finley Roundhouse in 2003 and left it vacant and abandoned since. The roof of the warehouse portion collapsed from a December 13, 2013, F1 tornado.

Current efforts to save and preserve the Finley Roundhouse are being led by the Save The Finley Roundhouse nonprofit organization, who is advocating for the structure to be restored and preserved as a local tourist landmark for Birmingham. The Finley Roundhouse has been recognized as an endangered historic site in the Alabama Trust for Historic Preservation's "Places in Peril" program (2017).

== See also ==
- Properties on the Alabama Register of Landmarks and Heritage by county (Jefferson–Macon)
