= Wood Avenue Historic District =

Historic district in Alabama, United States

- U.S. National Register of Historic Places
- U.S. Historic district
- Alabama Register of Landmarks and Heritage
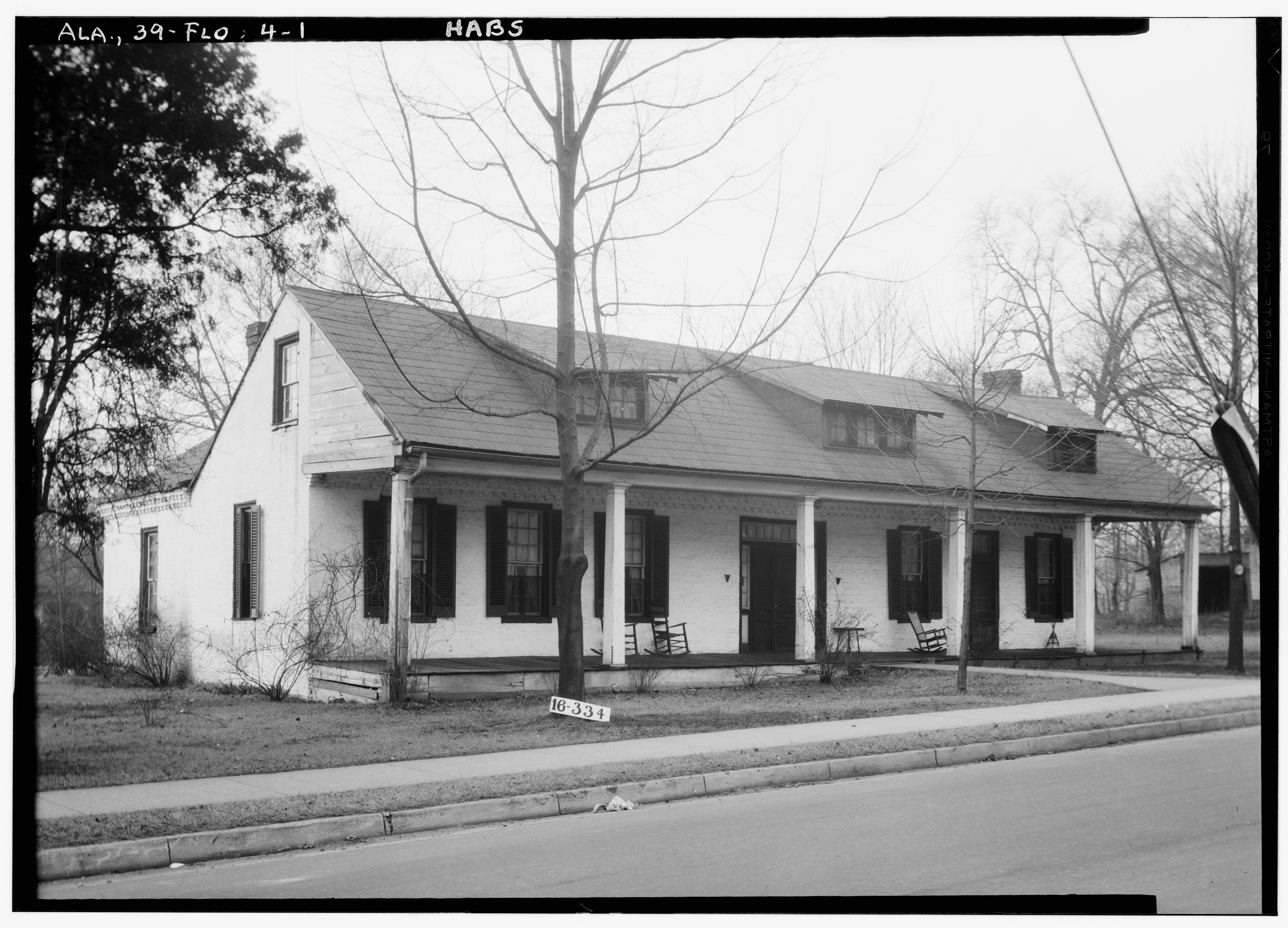
- The Lambeth House, pictured in a 1930s HABS photo

- Location within Alabama Location within the United States
- Location: N. Wood Ave. roughly bounded by Tuscaloosa and Hawthorne Sts.; also roughly along E. Hawthorne, Meridian and Kendrick Sts.; also roughly along Kendrick Ave. and 633 Hermitage Dr., Florence, Alabama
- Coordinates: 34°48′26″N 87°40′37″W
- Area: 50 acres (20 ha)
- Architectural style: Colonial Revival, Bungalow/Craftsman, Queen Anne, Tudor Revival
- NRHP reference No.: 78000493 (original); 96000020 (increase 1); 97000656 (increase 2)

Significant dates
- Added to NRHP: October 10, 1978
- Boundary increases: February 16, 1996; July 3, 1997
- Designated ARLH: May 9, 1978

The Wood Avenue Historic District is a historic district in Florence, Alabama. The residential neighborhood was primarily developed after Reconstruction, although five houses date from before the Civil War. By the time of Florence's economic boom of the 1880s, the most fashionable upper-class neighborhood in Florence, today known as the Sannoner Historic District, had already been filled in, leading development to move to Wood Avenue to the west. Most homes built during this time were large, Victorian structures, including many elaborate examples of Queen Anne architecture.

As the economy slowed in the 1910s, more modest homes were constructed, primarily bungalows. Although they now make up nearly half of the buildings in the district, the first bungalow in the area, the Wade-Ware House, met resistance from neighbors when it was built in 1916, arguing that its style was not up to the standards of the neighborhood. After the completion of Wilson Dam in 1926, Florence's economy quickened once more and larger homes began to be built in the district. Houses of this era tended to be Georgian Revival in style, although other revival styles, such as Spanish Colonial and Tudor are represented. As the neighborhood filled in, the focus of development shifted to the north and west, including in the Walnut Street Historic District.

The district was listed on the Alabama Register of Landmarks and Heritage and the National Register of Historic Places in 1978. Its boundaries were increased in 1996 and 1997.
