= Cherry Street Historic District (Florence, Alabama) =

Historic district in Alabama, United States

- U.S. National Register of Historic Places
- U.S. Historic district
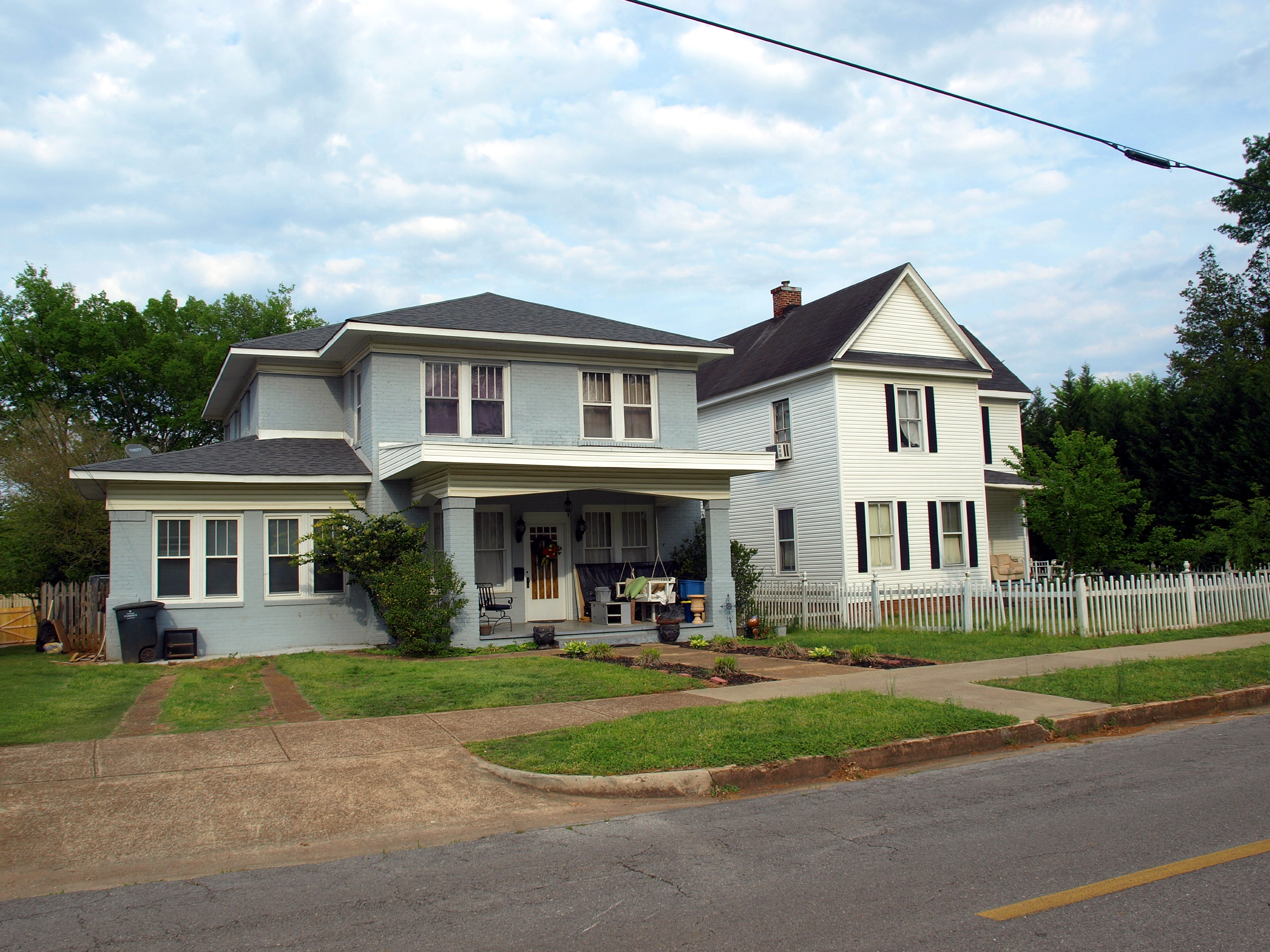
- 518 & 510 N. Cherry St. in April 2017

- Location within Alabama Location within the United States
- Location: Cherry St. between Hermitage Dr. and E. Tombigbee St., Florence, Alabama
- Coordinates: 34°48′29″N 87°40′21″W
- Area: 17 acres (6.9 ha)
- Architectural style: Queen Anne, Bungalow/Craftsman, Foursquare
- NRHP reference No.: 97000648
- Added to NRHP: July 3, 1997

The Cherry Street Historic District is a historic district in Florence, Alabama. Florence was founded in 1818 and quickly prospered as a cotton shipping port on the Tennessee River, but did not see its greatest growth until the latter part of the 19th century. Spurred by industrial development from several mills and iron furnaces as well as the Florence Wagon Works, the demand for middle-class, suburban homes increased. Five houses in the district date from the late 1800s, but the majority were constructed from the late 1910s through the mid 1930s, when the city saw further growth fueled by the construction of Wilson Dam and a large potassium nitrate production plant. The earliest houses in the district are predominantly Queen Anne style, with late 1800s houses being mostly two stories and early 1900s houses mostly one story. During the second wave of construction between 1920 and 1938, most houses built were bungalows. Five apartment buildings were also built to house the influx of workers coming to the area, centered on North Cherry Street and East Tuscaloosa Street, which became known as "Angel Corner" after its developer, J. M. Angel. The district was listed on the National Register of Historic Places in 1997.
