= North Cherry Street Historic District (Winston-Salem, North Carolina) =

Historic district in North Carolina, United States

- U.S. National Register of Historic Places
- U.S. Historic district
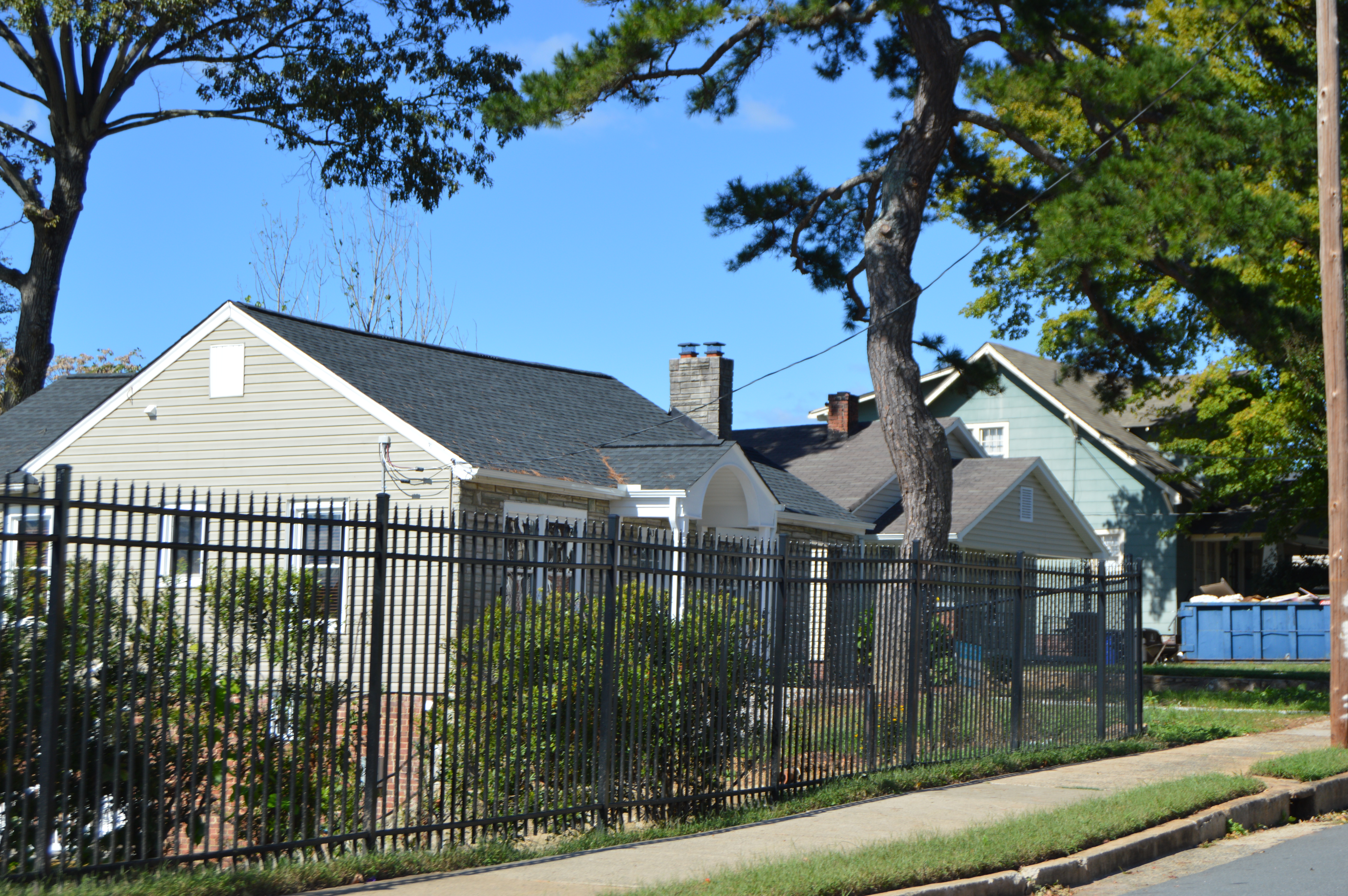
- 1400 block of Cherry

- Location within North Carolina Location within the United States
- Location: N. Cherry St. bounded by Fourteenth, Twenty-third and Seventeenth St., Lincoln and Pittsburg Ave., Winston-Salem, North Carolina
- Coordinates: 36°05′39″N 80°15′14″W
- Area: 22 acres (8.9 ha)
- Built: 1924
- Architectural style: Bungalow/craftsman, Colonial Revival, et al.
- NRHP reference No.: 04001394
- Added to NRHP: December 23, 2004; June 20, 2014

North Cherry Street Historic District is a national historic district located at Winston-Salem, Forsyth County, North Carolina. The district encompasses 62 contributing buildings and 1 contributing object in a historically African-American residential section of Winston-Salem. The buildings date from about 1925 to 1951, and include notable examples of Colonial Revival and Bungalow / American Craftsman style architecture.

It was listed on the National Register of Historic Places in 2004, with a boundary decrease in 2014.
