= Steven S. Smith =

American political scientist and academic

Steven S. Smith (born July 8, 1953) is Professor of Political Science at Arizona State University. He also is the Kate M. Gregg Emeritus Professor of Social Sciences and Professor Emeritus of Political Science at Washington University in St. Louis. For many years, he was the Director of the Weidenbaum Center on the Economy, Government, and Public Policy, He served on the faculties of George Washington University, Northwestern University, and the University of Minnesota and was a senior fellow at the Brookings Institution. Smith is one of the leading scholars of legislative institutions and congressional politics and is cited frequently by major news sources. He served as editor of Legislative Studies Quarterly and chaired the Legislative Studies Section of the American Political Science Association. He won the Barbara Sinclair Legacy Award (2026) and Barbara Sinclair Lecture Award (2023) from the American Political Science Association for his contributions to the study of legislative politics.

Smith's popular "Steve's Notes on Congressional Politics" provides short background essays on important features of congressional policymaking.

Smith has authored or edited many books on U.S. congressional politics and parliamentary politics in Russia. These include, Steering the Senate: The Emergence of Party Organization and Leadership, 1789–2024 (Cambridge University Press), with Gerald Gamm, The Senate Syndrome: The Evolution of Procedure Warfare in the Modern U.S. Senate (Univ of Oklahoma Press), Party Influence in Congress (Cambridge), Call to Order: Floor Politics in the House and Senate (Brookings) Politics or Principle: Filibustering in the United States Senate (Brookings), with Sarah Binder, The Politics of Institutional Choice: The Formation of the Russian State Duma (Princeton), with Thomas Remington, and Politics Over Process: Partisan Conflict and Post-Passage Processes in the U.S. Congress (University of Michigan Press), with Hong Min Park and Ryan J. Vander Wielen. Smith's textbook on congressional politics, The American Congress, is in its tenth edition; the later editions were coauthored with Jason Roberts and Ryan Vander Wielen.

Smith edited popular readers for undergraduates: The Principles and Practices of American Politics (CQ Press), seven editions with Samuel Kernell, and The American Congress Reader (Cambridge), with Roberts and Vander Wielen. Smith's edited volume, Reforming the Presidential Nomination Process, with Melanie Jane Springer, was published by Brookings in 2009.
