= James Spullock Williamson House =

Historic house in Alabama, United States

- U.S. National Register of Historic Places
- Alabama Register of Landmarks and Heritage
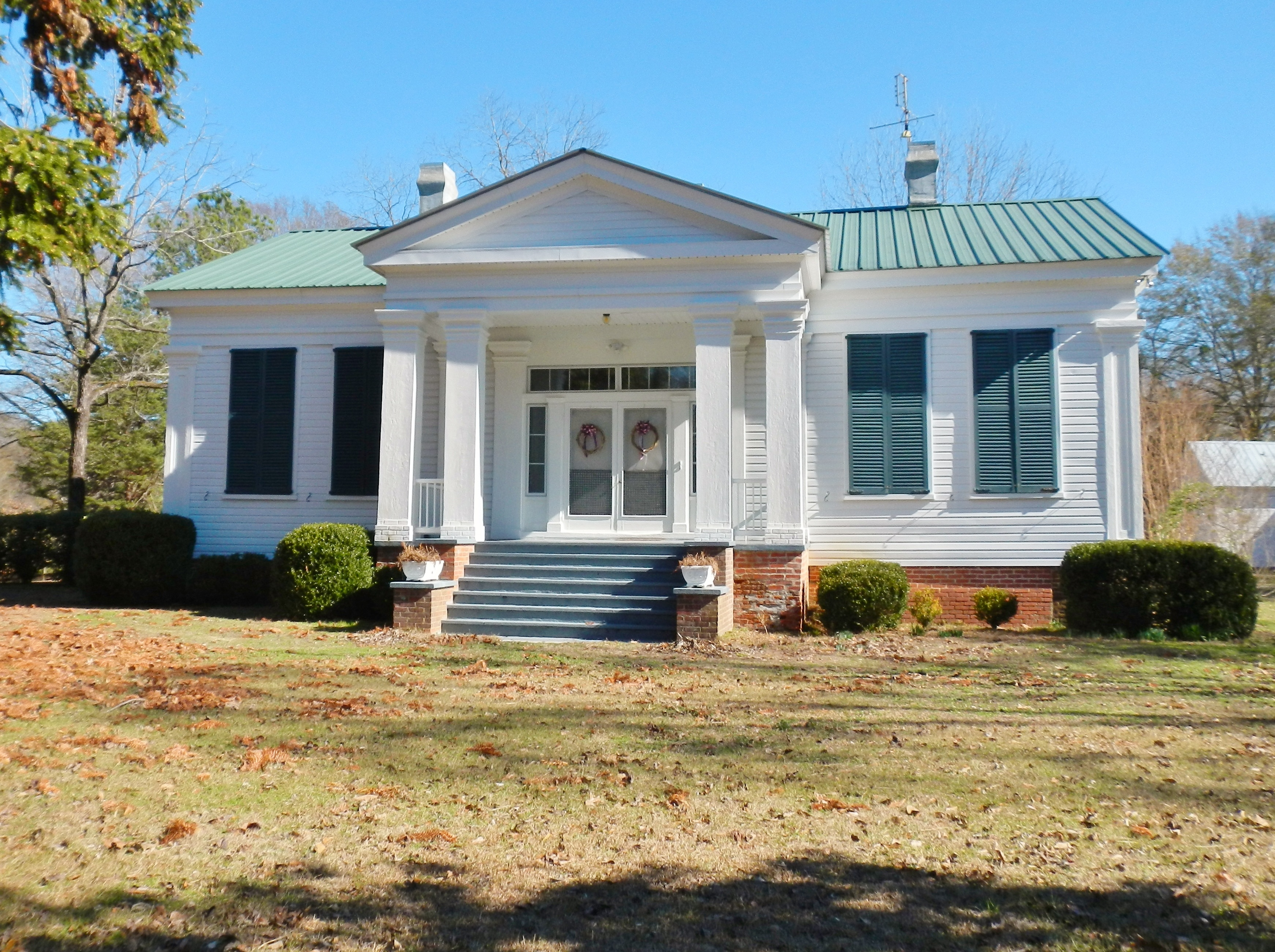
- The house in 2012

- Location within Alabama Location within the United States
- Location: AL 31, Sandy Ridge, Alabama
- Coordinates: 32°1′29″N 86°27′6″W
- Area: 14 acres (5.7 ha)
- Built: 1860
- Architectural style: Greek Revival
- NRHP reference No.: 88003123

Significant dates
- Added to NRHP: January 5, 1989
- Designated ARLH: September 12, 1988

The James Spullock Williamson House, also known as Merry Oaks, is a historic plantation house in the rural community of Sandy Ridge in Lowndes County, Alabama. The one-story Greek Revival-style house was completed circa 1860.

The house was built for James Spullock Williamson, a planter and state legislator. He had land holdings in excess of 2,500 acres (1,000 ha) in 1860, with his real estate and personal property valued in excess of $150,000. He owned 98 slaves during this time. Williamson was a son of the first judge of the Lowndes County Court, Peter Williamson, who had emigrated from Wilkes County, Georgia around 1819.

James Spullock Williamson was elected to the Alabama House of Representatives for the 1857–58 session. He also served during the Alabama Constitutional Convention of 1861 that preceded the American Civil War. Williamson was killed in 1862, during the Battle of Glendale in Henrico County, Virginia. He was serving as a captain in the 14th Regiment Alabama Infantry.

The house has remained the property of Williamson descendants since it was built. It was added to the Alabama Register of Landmarks and Heritage on September 12, 1988, and to the National Register of Historic Places on January 5, 1989, due to its architectural significance.
