= College Place Historic District =

Historic district in Alabama, United States

- U.S. National Register of Historic Places
- U.S. Historic district
- Alabama Register of Landmarks and Heritage
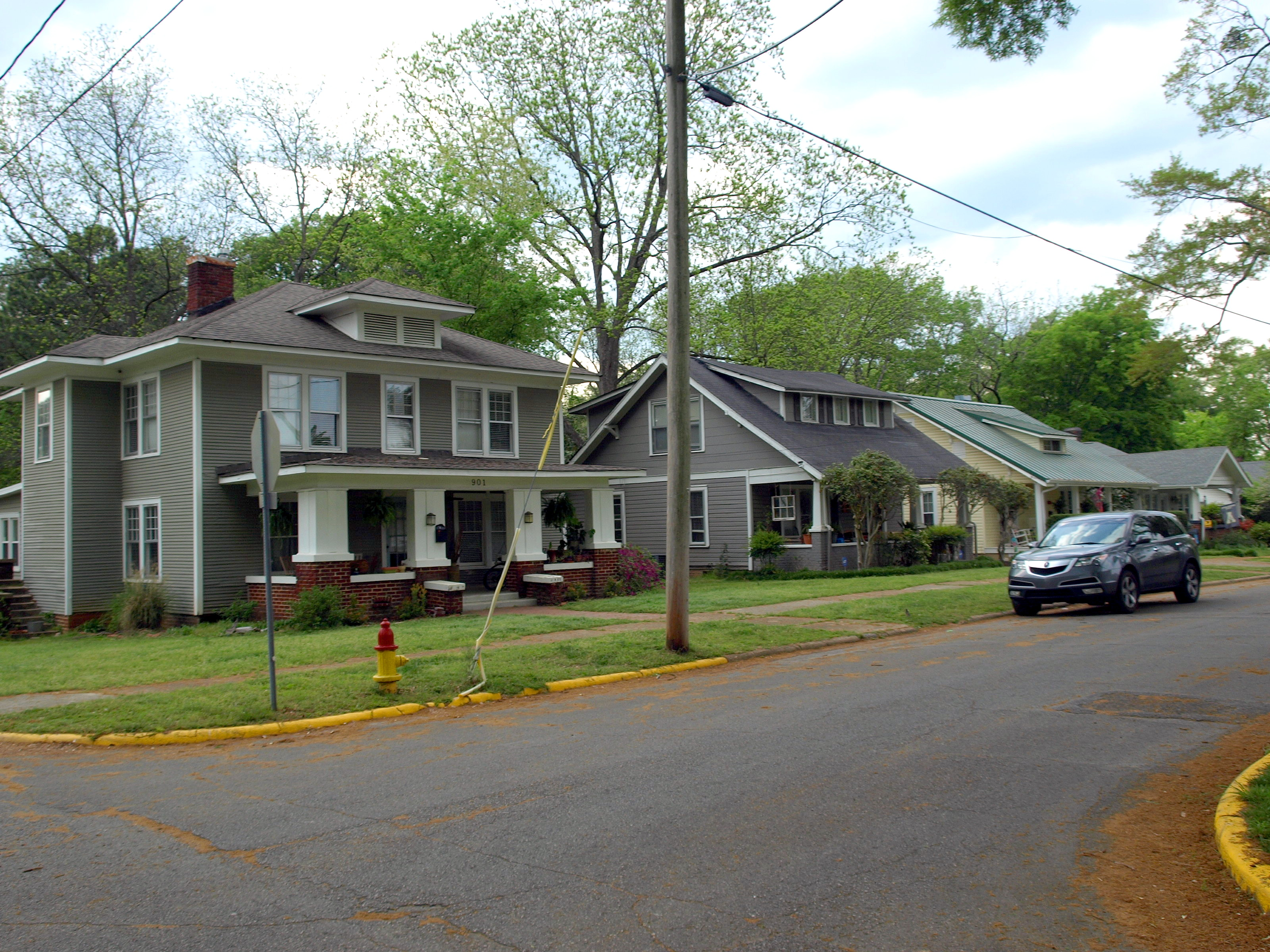
- 901–913 Sherrod Ave. in April 2017

- Location within Alabama Location within the United States
- Location: Along Sherrod Ave., between W. Lelia St. and Circular Rd., also roughly along W. Lelia and W. Mattie Lou Sts., Florence, Alabama
- Coordinates: 34°48′48″N 87°40′49″W
- Area: 1.6 acres (0.65 ha)
- Architectural style: Bungalow/Craftsman
- NRHP reference No.: 94001547 (original); 98001030 (increase)

Significant dates
- Added to NRHP: January 12, 1995
- Boundary increase: August 14, 1998
- Designated ARLH: July 29, 1992

The College Place Historic District is a historic district in Florence, Alabama. The area was the site of a Confederate fortification during the Civil War. In 1882 the land was purchased by Judge J. J. Mitchell and used as pasture land; Mitchell's house sits on Wood Avenue to the east of the district. The property began to be sold off in the 1900s, with the oldest house in the district dating to 1907. Construction in the district accelerated in the mid- to late-1920s, with many professionals including physicians, merchants, scientists, and attorneys building homes in the neighborhood. Styles represented include Mission Revival, Georgian Revival, and bungalows. The district rises on a slight slope above the campus of the University of North Alabama, and has vistas of the campus including Wesleyan Hall. The district was listed on the Alabama Register of Landmarks and Heritage in 1992 and the National Register of Historic Places in 1995; the boundaries were extended in 1998.
