= Bartholomew J. Donnelly House =

Historic house in Florida, United States

- U.S. National Register of Historic Places
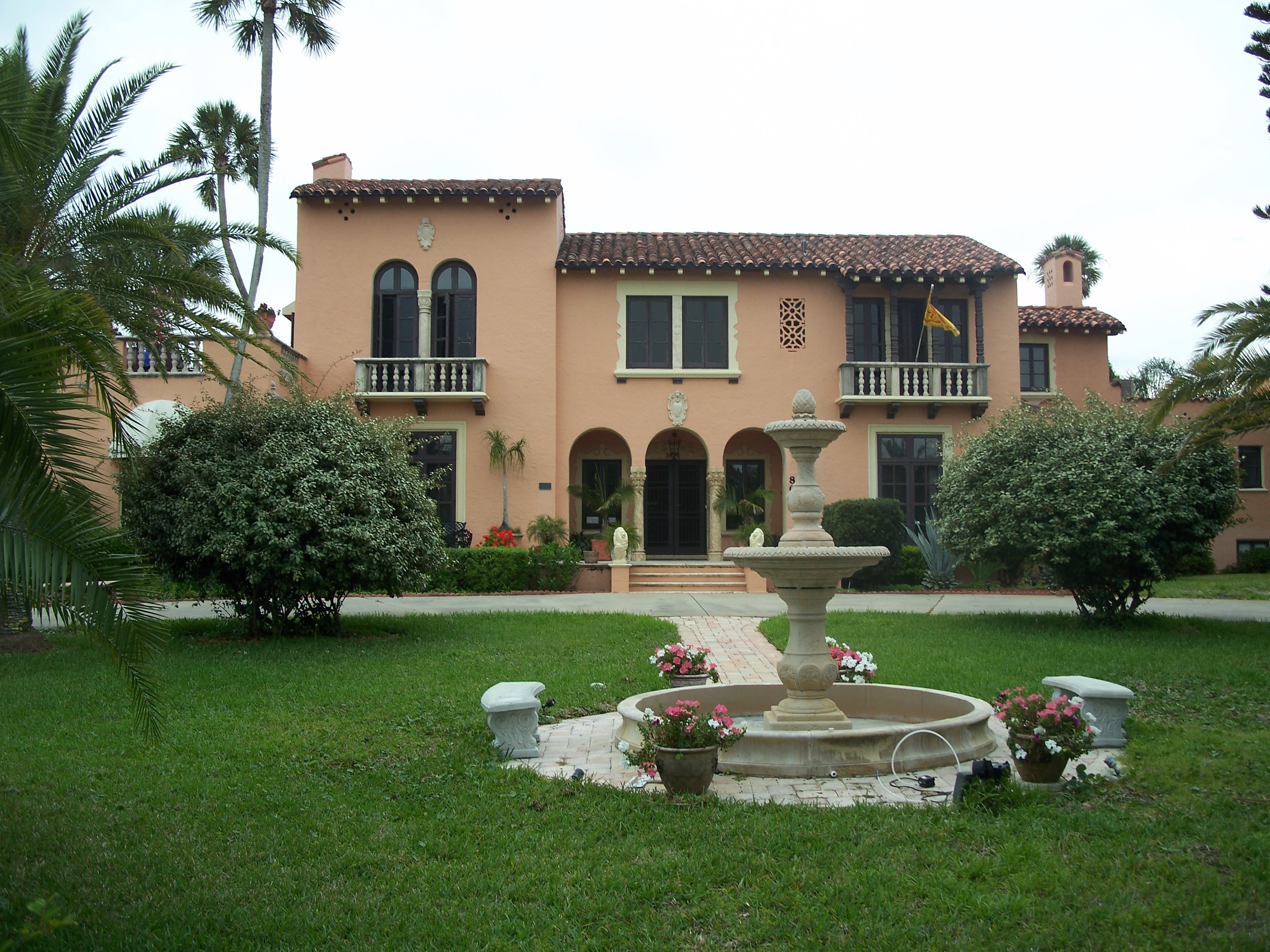

- Location within Volusia County
- Location: Daytona Beach, Volusia County, Florida
- Coordinates: 29°14′16″N 81°1′10″W
- Architectural style: Mission/Spanish Revival
- NRHP reference No.: 93000726
- Added to NRHP: August 2, 1993

The Bartholomew J. Donnelly House is a historic home in Daytona Beach, Florida, United States. It is located at 801 North Peninsula Drive. On August 2, 1993, it was added to the U.S. National Register of Historic Places.
