= Seminary–O'Neal Historic District =

Historic district in Alabama, United States

- U.S. National Register of Historic Places
- U.S. Historic district
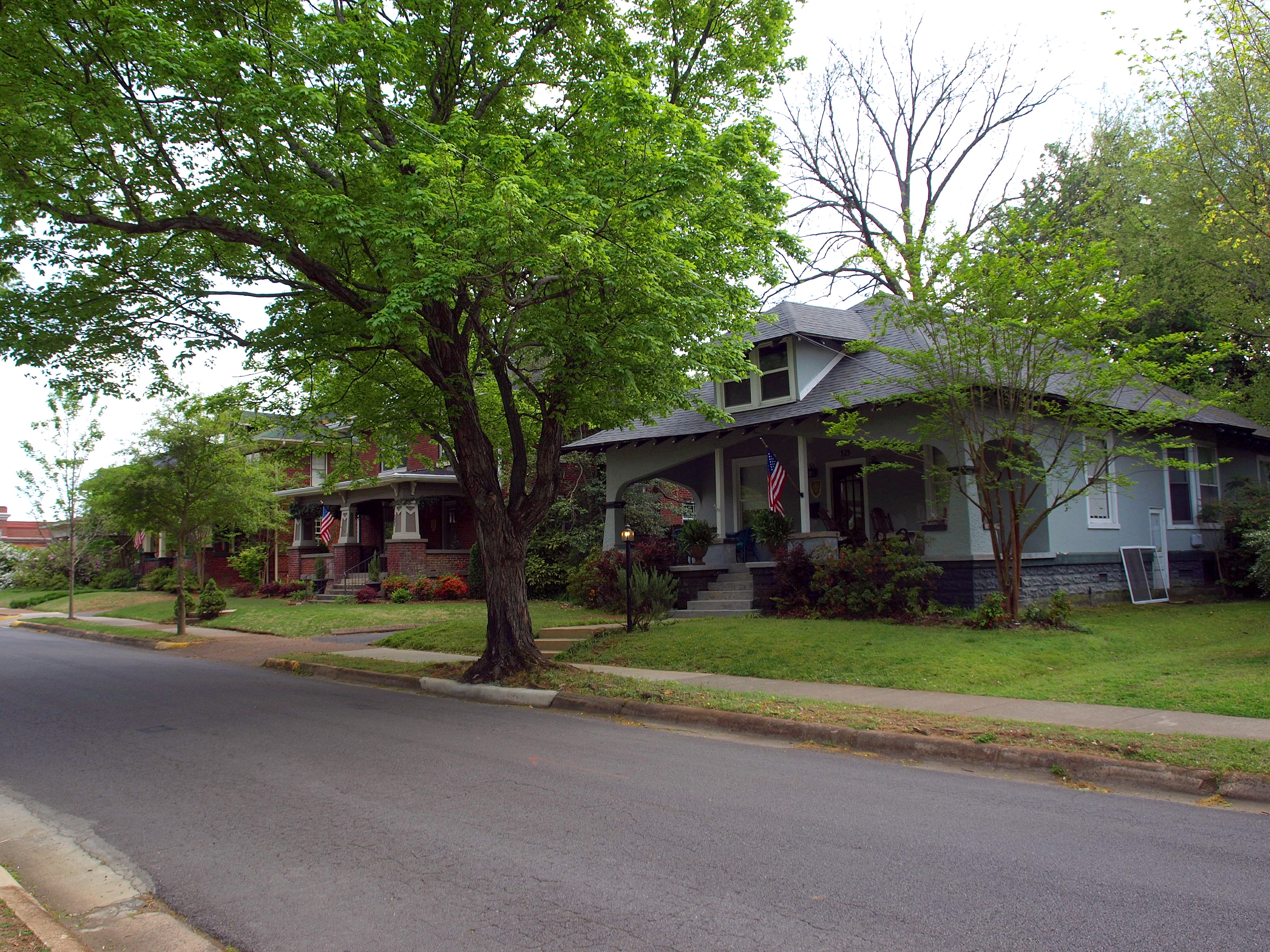
- 521 & 525 N. Seminary in April 2017

- Location within Alabama Location within the United States
- Location: Seminary St. between Hermitage Dr. and Irvine Ave. and Irvine between Seminary and Wood Ave., Florence, Alabama
- Coordinates: 34°48′20″N 87°40′39″W
- Area: 5 acres (2.0 ha)
- Built: 1919
- Architectural style: Bungalow/Craftsman, Foursquare
- NRHP reference No.: 95000092
- Added to NRHP: February 17, 1995

The Seminary–O'Neal Historic District is a historic district in Florence, Alabama. The district runs along parts of North Seminary Street and East Irvine Avenue near the University of North Alabama campus. The 12 contributing properties are Vernacular cottages, bungalows, and Sears Roebuck-sourced American Foursquares. These were the styles most common in middle-class homes between 1908 and 1943, when Florence underwent a period of large growth driven by manufacturing and, later, the Tennessee Valley Authority. The two Foursquares, built in 1908 and 1926, sit next to each other on Seminary Street. The remaining structures on Seminary are bungalows. The three cottages, two of brick and one of wood, and one bungalow line Irving Avenue. The district was listed on the National Register of Historic Places in 1995.
