= Sandy Ridge, Alabama =

Unincorporated community in Alabama, United States

- Unincorporated community
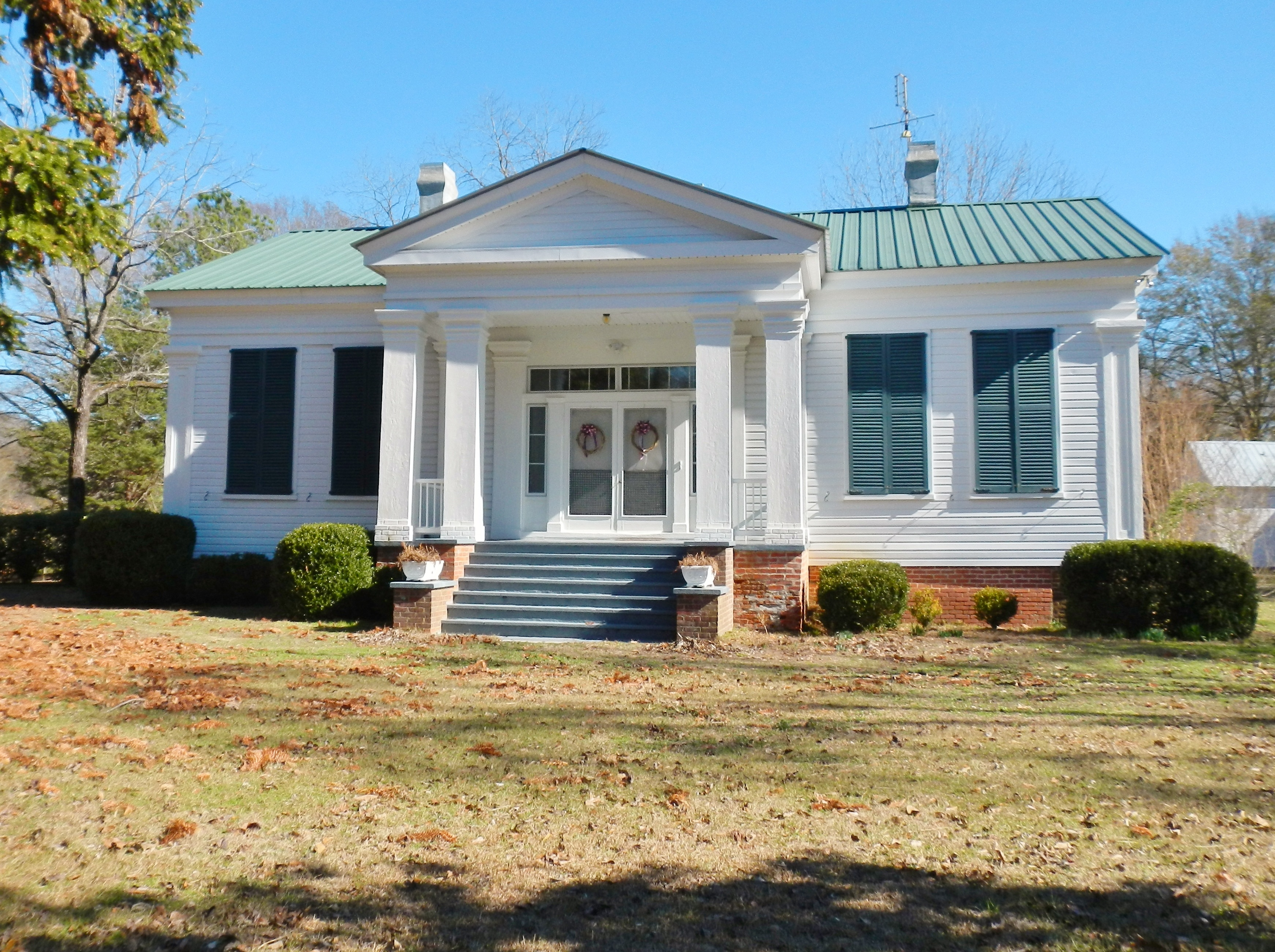
- The James Spullock Williamson House, located in Sandy Ridge, is a Greek Revival-style plantation home.

- Location within Alabama Location within the United States
- Coordinates: 32.02459°N 86.45191°W
- Country: United States
- State: Alabama
- County: Lowndes
- Elevation: 384 ft (117 m)
- Time zone: UTC-6 (Central (CST))
  - Summer (DST): UTC-5 (CDT)
- Area code: 334

Sandy Ridge, sometimes spelled Sandyridge, is an unincorporated community in Lowndes County, Alabama, United States.

== Demographics ==
Historical population
Census	Pop.	Note	%±
1880	168		—
U.S. Decennial Census

Sandy Ridge appeared on the 1880 and 1890 U.S. Censuses, but was not separately returned in 1890. It has not appeared on the census rolls since.

== Geography ==
Sandy Ridge is located at 32.02459°N 86.45191°W and has an elevation of 384 feet (117 m).
