= William Koger House (Smithsonia, Alabama) =

- U.S. National Register of Historic Places
- Location within Alabama Location within the United States
- Nearest city: Smithsonia, Alabama
- Coordinates: 34°49′19″N 87°52′25″W
- Area: 85 acres (34 ha)
- Built: 1830
- Built by: Nathaniel Harrison Marks
- Architectural style: Tidewater Cottage
- MPS: Tidewater Cottages in the Tennessee Valley TR
- NRHP reference No.: 86001542
- Added to NRHP: July 9, 1986

The William Koger House is a historic residence near Smithsonia, Alabama. The house was built around 1830 by William and Martha Koger, planters from Virginia. The Kogers brought their native architectural form, the Tidewater-type cottage, with them to North Alabama. The house was the center of a 630-acre (255-ha) plantation, which included an island in the Tennessee River. After William's death, Martha continued to manage the farm until her death in 1892.

The house is constructed of brick, laid in Flemish bond on the façade and in Common bond on the other sides. There are twin chimneys in the gable ends, with a large arched window between the chimneys in one end that was added in the late 19th century. The entry has a transom and sidelights and is flanked by pairs of nine-over-nine sash windows. Unusual for the style, there is no evidence that the entry was ever covered by a porch. The house has a central hall with two rooms on either side, and had an ell off the rear of the house, until it was destroyed by fire in the late 20th century.

The house was listed on the National Register of Historic Places in 1986.
