= Wilson Park Houses =

- U.S. National Register of Historic Places
- U.S. Historic district
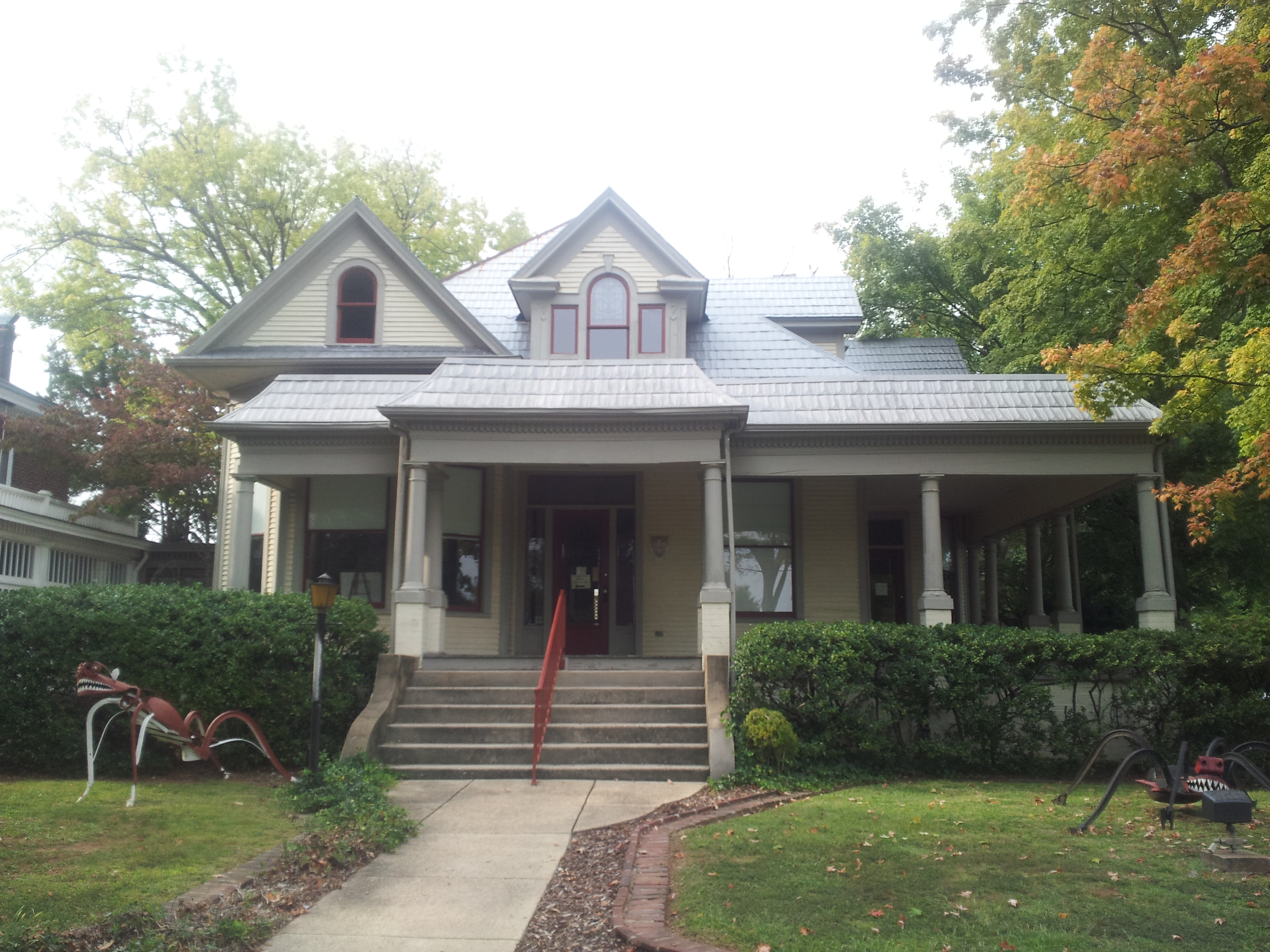
- The Wright-Douglass House in September 2012

- Location within Alabama Location within the United States
- Location: 209, 217, and 223 E. Tuscaloosa St., Florence, Alabama
- Coordinates: 34°48′14″N 87°40′31″W
- Area: 1 acre (0.40 ha)
- Architectural style: Colonial Revival, Late Victorian
- NRHP reference No.: 79000390
- Added to NRHP: January 25, 1979

Kennedy-Douglass House

Alabama Register of Landmarks and Heritage
- Designated: May 11, 1976

The Wilson Park Houses are a group of three historic homes in Florence, Alabama. Built as upper-class residences between 1890 and 1918, the houses are adjacent to Wilson Park, laid out as a public space upon the city's founding and later renamed for President Woodrow Wilson. Two of the houses came to be owned by Hiram Kennedy Douglass, who upon his death in 1975 willed the houses to an organization willing to maintain them for the public. The houses are now owned by the city and contain the Kennedy-Douglass Center for the Arts. The houses were listed on the National Register of Historic Places in 1979.

== Southall House ==
The Southall House at 209 Tuscaloosa Street is the oldest of the three, having been built in 1890. It was purchased in 1894 by Charles M. Southall, founder of Southall Drugs. The two-story frame house was built in Victorian style, with the upper floor and front-facing gable covered in scalloped wood shingles. An L-shaped porch wraps around the side and half of the façade, supported by four pairs of square columns. The house remained in the Southall family until after 1979, when it was donated to the city to join the Arts Center.

== Kennedy-Douglass House ==
The center house in the block, the Kennedy-Douglass House, was built in 1918 in Georgian Revival style. It was built by James Josephus Douglass, a merchant and farm owner, and later passed to his son, Hiram Kennedy Douglass. The younger Douglass, an Episcopal minister educated at Oxford, filled the house with period furniture and other items that were donated along with the house. The façade is dominated by an elliptical portico, supported by Doric columns with a balustraded top deck. The double front door has narrow, 10-panel sidelights and a large fanlight above. Flanking the portico on both floors is a set of three sash windows, a nine-over-one window between two narrower six-over-one sashes. A sunroom topped with a deck extends from the east side of the house.

== Wright-Douglass House ==
On the corner of Tuscaloosa and Wood Avenue sits the Wright-Douglass House, built in 1910. It was physician E. B. Wright and sold to an uncle of Hiram Douglass and then to other family members before being purchased by Hiram himself. The house had been subdivided into apartments before the city and museum assumed ownership. The Victorian house has a multi-gabled roof and wraparound porch with a mansard roof. One-over-one sash windows are spread asymmetrically across the front, including in a bay window on the left of the façade. Two gabled dormers project from the second floor, the central one of which has a Palladian window.
