= Florence Wagon Works Site =

- U.S. National Register of Historic Places
- Location within Alabama Location within the United States
- Location: S of Dekalb Ave. between Main and Spurr Sts., Florence, Alabama
- Coordinates: 34°48′9″N 87°38′35″W
- Area: 7.5 acres (3.0 ha)
- Built: 1889
- NRHP reference No.: 96000596
- Added to NRHP: June 13, 1996

The Florence Wagon Works was a wagon manufacturing plant in Florence, Alabama. The factory was founded on the banks of the Tennessee River in 1889 by A. D. Bellamy. By 1904 the works employed 175 and produced 15,000 wagons annually at its peak. As motorized trucks and tractors replaced horse-drawn wagons, the factory switched to production of lawn chairs, swings, and other furniture. It closed in 1941. The site is adjacent to Wilson Dam, and it owned by the Tennessee Valley Authority. The University of Alabama Department of Archeology surveyed the site in 1993. Portions of 17 buildings and structures remain, but only in ruins. The most intact structure is a wooden trestle that carried the Louisville and Nashville Railroad line over a creek. The site was listed on the National Register of Historic Places in 1996.
