= Smithsonia, Alabama =

Unincorporated community in Alabama, United States

- Unincorporated community
- Location within Alabama Location within the United States
- Coordinates: 34°47′39″N 87°52′45″W
- Country: United States
- State: Alabama
- County: Lauderdale
- Elevation: 512 ft (156 m)
- Time zone: UTC-6 (Central (CST))
  - Summer (DST): UTC-5 (CDT)
- Area codes: 256 & 938
- GNIS feature ID: 157080

Smithsonia, also known as Cave Springs, is an unincorporated community in Lauderdale County, in the U.S. state of Alabama.

== History ==
Smithsonia was originally known as Cave Springs, in reference to the numerous caves in the surrounding area. It was then named Smithsonia, in honor of Columbus Smith, a landowner and merchant following the American Civil War. Smith operated a ferry, general store, grist mill, and cotton gin in Smithsonia. A post office was in operation under the name Smithsonia from 1886 to 1927.
