= Wesleyan Hall =

- U.S. National Register of Historic Places
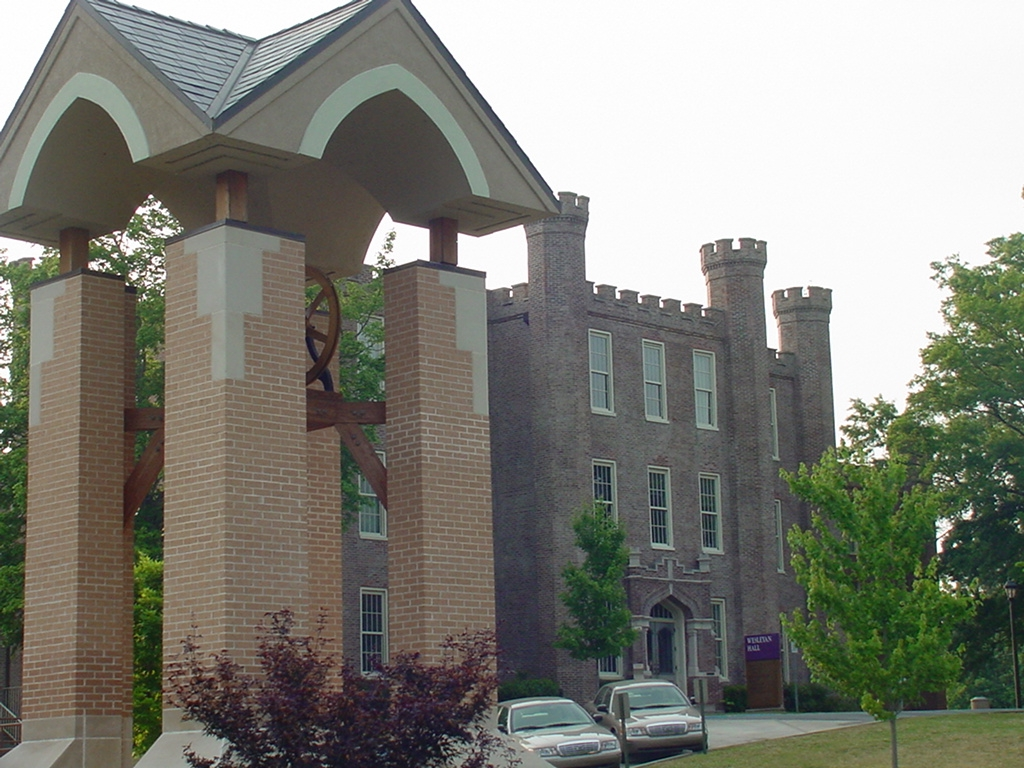
- Location: Morrison Ave., Florence, Alabama
- Coordinates: 34°48′32″N 87°40′45″W
- Built: 1855
- Architect: Morrison, Zebulon Pike
- Architectural style: Gothic Revival, Castellated sub-style
- NRHP reference No.: 74000417
- Added to NRHP: June 20, 1974

Wesleyan Hall, constructed in 1855, is one of the oldest structures on the University of North Alabama campus, located in Florence, Alabama.

== History ==
With its distinctive towers, Wesleyan Hall also is considered one of the most eminent landmarks in North Alabama. The Gothic Revival structure was designed to serve LaGrange College when this Methodist institution relocated from Franklin to Lauderdale county and subsequently was renamed and rechartered as Florence Wesleyan University.

In 1855, the year the structure was completed, a President's Report showed an enrollment of 180 students. The fledgling university peaked at 225 students in the early 1860s, shortly before the outbreak of the Civil War.

During the war, Wesleyan Hall was occupied by both Union and Confederate armies.

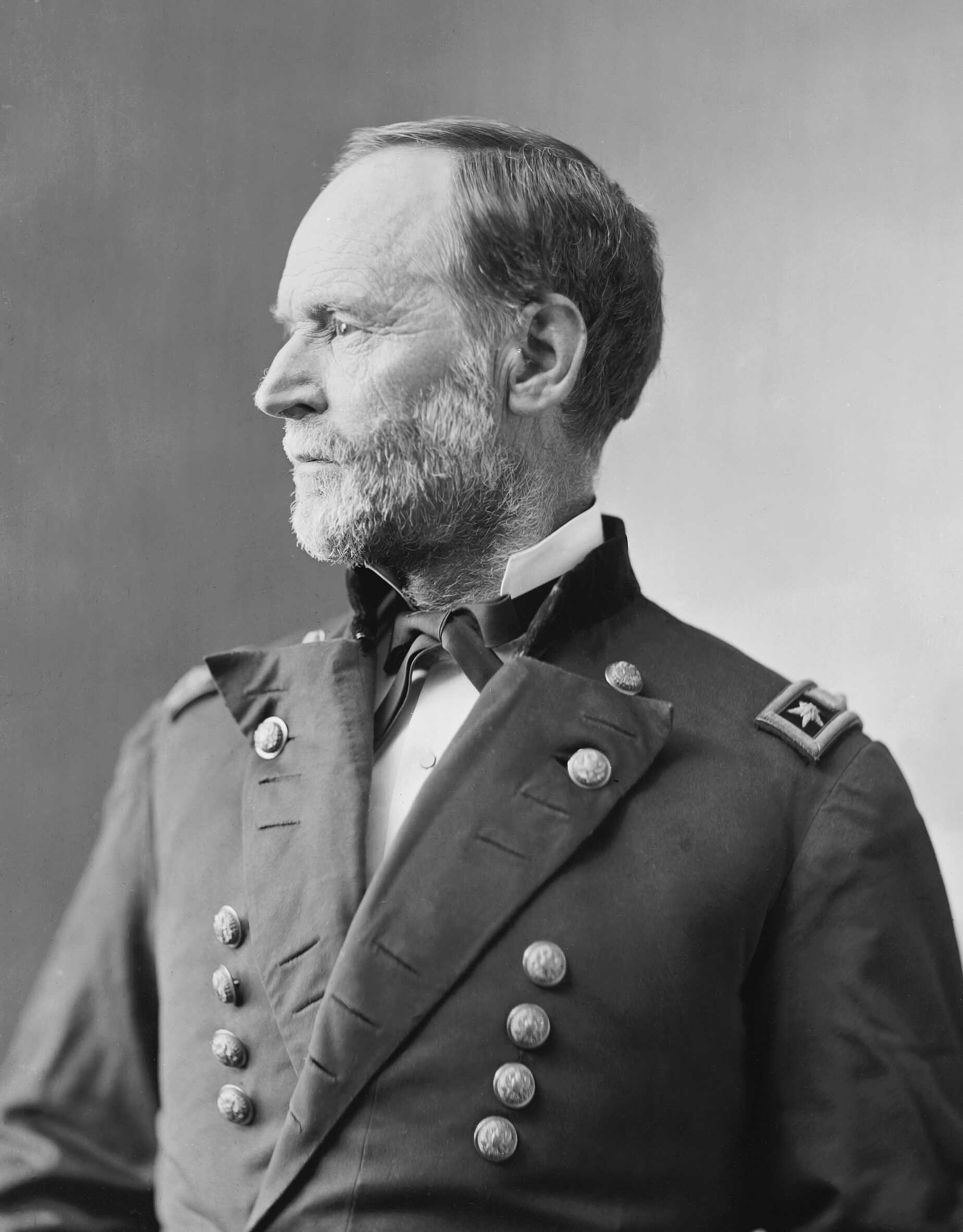
General William Tecumseh Sherman is considered the most famous Union officer to occupy Wesleyan Hall during the Civil War.

General William Tecumseh Sherman is considered the most famous Union occupant of Wesleyan Hall during the war. In late 1864, shortly before his ill-fated involvement in the battles of Franklin and Nashville, Confederate General John Bell Hood occupied the building. The surrounding grounds were occupied by his troops and served as a meeting place for military personnel and townspeople for parties, dances and concerts. Confederate Generals Pierre G.T. Beauregard and Stephen D. Lee also occupied the adjoining grounds during the war and also may have used Wesleyan Hall as their headquarters.

Following the war, Dr. Septimus Rice was the University's sole instructor, teaching classes in the Preparatory School and holding college-level courses in Wesleyan Hall. Despite a prolonged effort by the new Wesleyan University president, Dr. William H. Anderson, the institution continued to founder, and in 1871, the doors of Wesleyan Hall were closed.

Recognizing the need for trained teachers in the post-war South, the Methodist Episcopal Church turned over Wesleyan Hall and the surrounding 12-acre (49,000 m^{2}) grounds to the state of Alabama, which then chartered it as a state normal school.

During this period, the halls of Wesleyan remained unheated, so stoves were used to warm classrooms, while coal oil lamps were employed for lighting. Because of the initially small enrollment, the upper floors were used as dormitories.

A dilapidated white-washed board fence stood along the perimeter of the Wesleyan grounds to prevent livestock owned by nearby townspeople from wandering onto campus. On the south side of the structure in a similar state of disrepair stood a number of old stables used to quarter horses of local country boys attending the school. A large cistern in the rear of the Wesleyan supplied the school's water supply.

At the turn of the 20th century, the 45-year-old structure remained the only building owned by the school. The exterior of the building had changed little since its construction in 1856, bearing the same castle-like towers, battlements and top-floor observatory. Likewise, the campus adjoining Wesleyan encompassed only the original 12 acres (49,000 m^{2}).

A three-story building finally was added in 1909 to accommodate increased enrollment and became known as Wesleyan Annex.

== Today ==
Part of the 130-acre (0.53 km^{2}) University of North Alabama campus, Wesleyan Hall currently contains the departments of Geography, Psychology, and Foreign Languages. It also houses the Geographic Research Center, a cartography lab, and a language lab.

The Department of Military Science is located in Wesleyan Annex.

Wesleyan also houses personal effects and mementoes of former Alabama Supreme Court Chief Justice and U.S. Senator Howell Heflin, a native of nearby Tuscumbia. The building is listed in the National Register of Historic Places.

== Wesleyan Bell and Tower ==
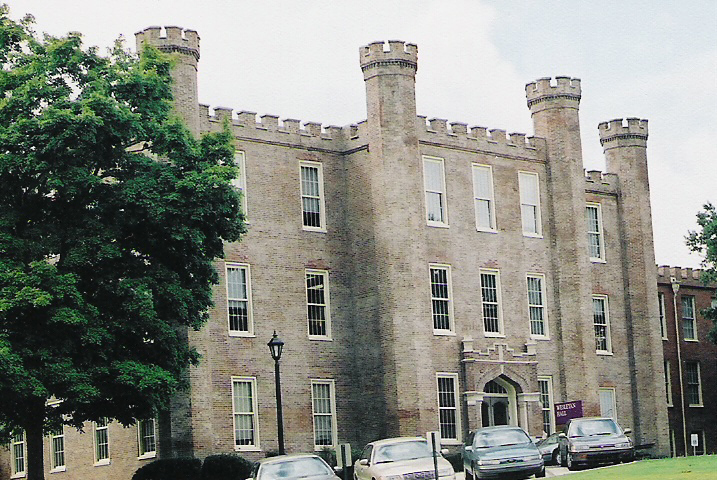
Historic Wesleyan Hall, taken in 2004

Adjacent to Wesleyan Hall in a specially constructed tower is the Wesleyan Bell, which tolled regularly throughout the last quarter of the 19th century to summon Florence Normal School students to class. Sometime around 1910, the bell was removed from Wesleyan Hall and stored. Rediscovered after the passage of almost a century in 2002, the 130-year-old Wesleyan Bell finally was restored to a prominent place on campus following construction of the Smith Bell Tower in 2004.
