= Old Florence Water Tower =

- Water Tower
- U.S. National Register of Historic Places
- Alabama Register of Landmarks and Heritage
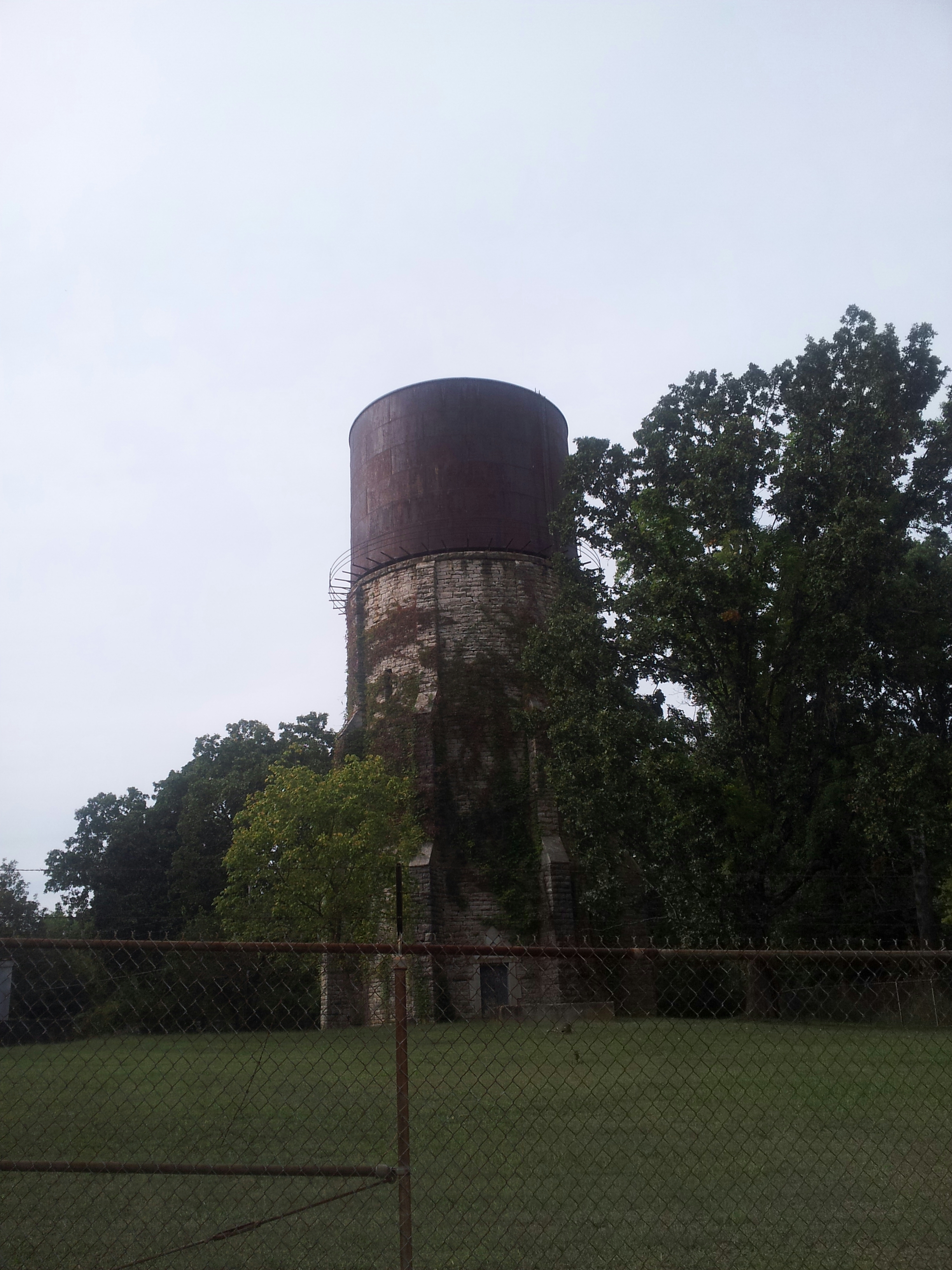
- The tower in September 2012

- Location within Alabama Location within the United States
- Location: Seymore St., Florence, Alabama
- Coordinates: 34°49′29″N 87°41′27″W
- Area: 0.8 acres (0.32 ha)
- Built: 1889
- Built by: Jeter & Boardman Gas & Water Assn.
- NRHP reference No.: 80000700

Significant dates
- Added to NRHP: April 28, 1980
- Designated ARLH: October 19, 1979

The Old Florence Water Tower is a historic water tower in Florence, Alabama. It was built in 1889 by the Jeter and Boardman Gas and Water Association to increase water capacity in the town, which was undergoing a boom in population. The tower has a masonry base that is 70 feet (21 m) high, 30 feet (9.1 m) in diameter, with supports tapering from 10 to 5 feet (3.0 to 1.5 m) thick. The wrought iron tank is 40 feet (12 m) in diameter, and is composed of six 5 feet (1.5 m) bands, giving a capacity of 282,000 US gallons (1,070,000 L; 235,000 imp gal). It was replaced with a new tower in 1935. The tower was listed on the Alabama Register of Landmarks and Heritage in 1979 and the National Register of Historic Places in 1980.
