= Locust Street Historic District (Florence, Alabama) =

Historic district in Alabama, United States

- U.S. National Register of Historic Places
- U.S. Historic district
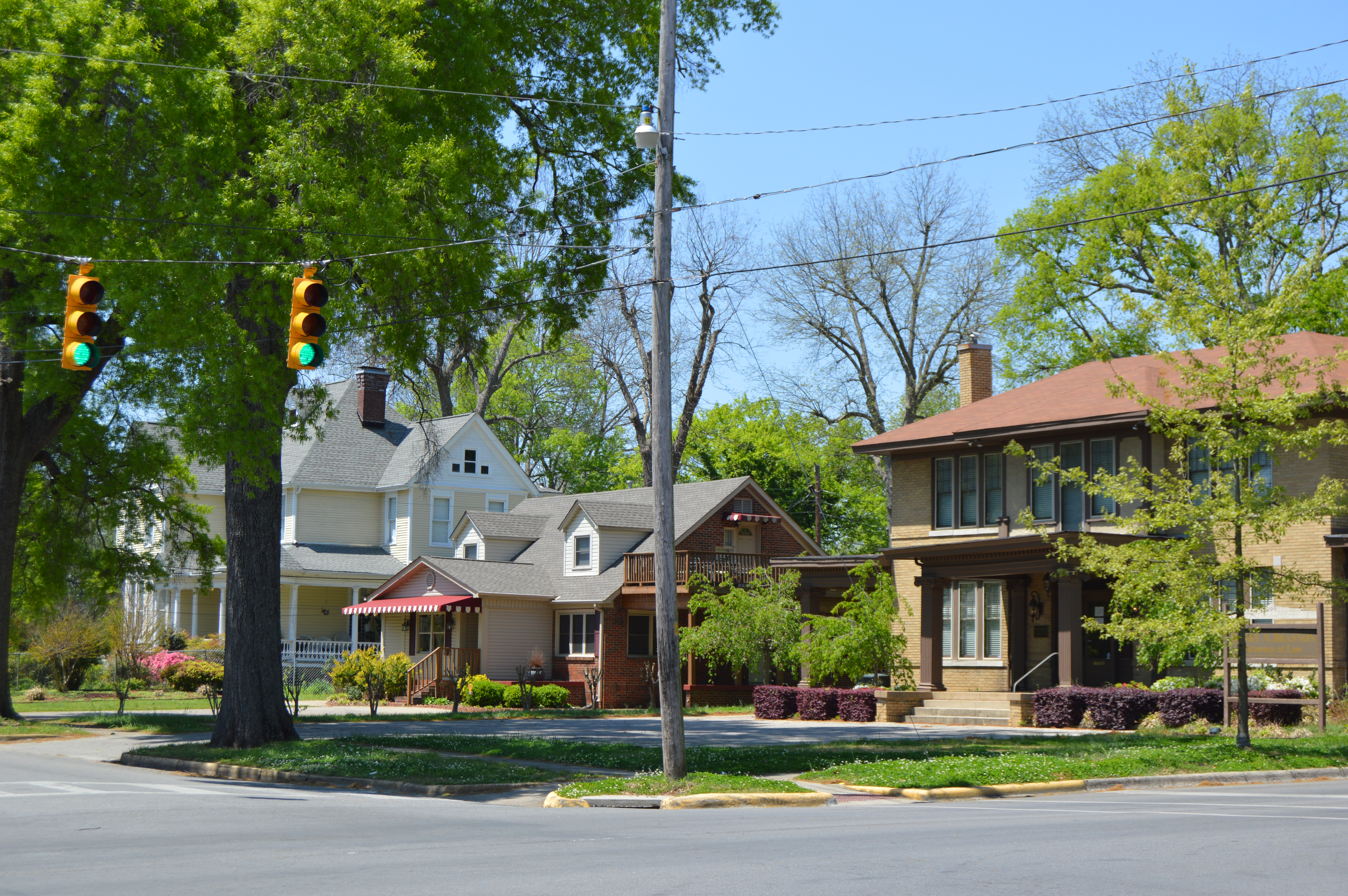
- Houses along Tuscaloosa Street in 2014

- Location within Alabama Location within the United States
- Location: Roughly bounded by Pine St., College St., Locust St., and Irvine Ave., Florence, Alabama
- Coordinates: 34°48′8″N 87°40′47″W
- Area: 60 acres (24 ha)
- Architectural style: Late Victorian, Late 19th And 20th Century Revivals
- NRHP reference No.: 02001065
- Added to NRHP: October 3, 2002

The Locust Street Historic District is a historic district in Florence, Alabama. Situated to the northwest of downtown, the residential neighborhood began to develop during Florence's manufacturing-fueled economic boom of the late 1880s. Several large Victorian houses were built in the area around Thimbleton which was built before Tuscaloosa St.. was laid out in the design of Florence by Sannoner. In deference to Thimbleton, Tuscaloosa St. has less width than the other streets. Renowned historical architect, Harvey Jones described Thimbleton as having 3 well done restorations, the original structure being built between 1820 and 1825 with Federalist Architecture, facing Pine St..The last restoration was late 1800s with French Second Empire Period Architecture, adding 2 rooms, attaching the kitchen, and changing the mansion to face Tuscsloosa St. Other smaller Victorian cottages were also built, many by middle-class residents who moved to Florence looking for work or to take advantage of the city's schools.

The next wave of construction began in the 1920s, when two potassium nitrate plants and the construction of Wilson Dam drove the city's growth. Over 85 Craftsman-style bungalows (representing over half of the district's 168 contributing properties) were built. Other larger Craftsman houses were constructed, as well as the only Prairie-style house in the district. Other styles of homes were built in smaller numbers later in the century, including Tudor Revival, Minimalist Traditional, and Colonial Revival.

The district was listed on the National Register of Historic Places in 2002.
