= White Hall, Alabama =

- Town
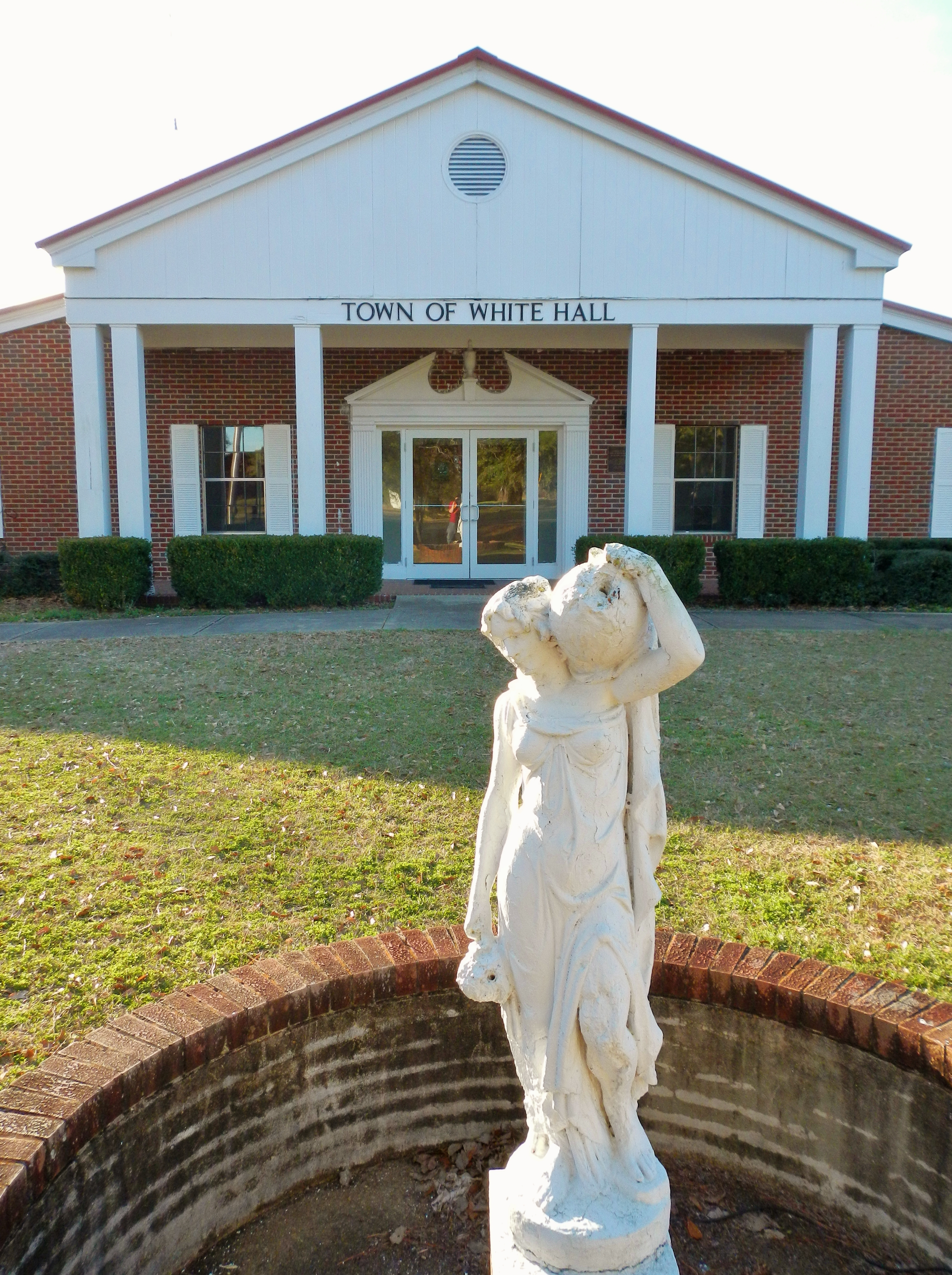
- White Hall Town Hall

- Location of White Hall in Lowndes County, Alabama.
- Coordinates: 32°18′50″N 86°42′50″W
- Country: United States
- State: Alabama
- County: Lowndes

Area
  - Total: 15.54 sq mi (40.24 km^{2})
  - Land: 15.32 sq mi (39.67 km^{2})
  - Water: 0.22 sq mi (0.57 km^{2})
- Elevation: 148 ft (45 m)

Population (2020)
  - Total: 806
  - Density: 52.6/sq mi (20.32/km^{2})
- Time zone: UTC-6 (Central (CST))
  - Summer (DST): UTC-5 (CDT)
- FIPS code: 01-81912
- GNIS feature ID: 2406877

White Hall is a town in Lowndes County, Alabama, United States. As of the 2020 census, White Hall had a population of 806. The community was named for a plantation that was destroyed in an 1882 tornado. It is part of the Montgomery Metropolitan Statistical Area.

It was established during the Great Depression in 1935 as a New Deal project under the Resettlement Administration, similar to the town of Skyline. Because of Southern racial segregation, White Hall was intended for the African-American majority population in the area. The town did not incorporate until 1979.

== Geography ==
According to the U.S. Census Bureau, the town has a total area of 15.5 square miles (40 km^{2}), of which 15.5 square miles (40 km^{2}) is land and 0.1 square miles (0.26 km^{2}) (0.39%) is water.

== Demographics ==
Historical population
Census	Pop.	Note	%±
1970	367		—
1980	251		−31.6%
1990	814		224.3%
2000	1,014		24.6%
2010	858		−15.4%
2020	806		−6.1%
U.S. Decennial Census; 2013 Estimate

=== 2020 census ===
White Hall town, Alabama – Racial and ethnic composition Note: the US Census treats Hispanic/Latino as an ethnic category. This table excludes Latinos from the racial categories and assigns them to a separate category. Hispanics/Latinos may be of any race.
Race / Ethnicity (NH = Non-Hispanic)	Pop 2010	Pop 2020	% 2010	% 2020
White alone (NH)	21	22	2.45%	2.73%
Black or African American alone (NH)	820	759	95.57%	94.17%
Native American or Alaska Native alone (NH)	2	0	0.23%	0.00%
Asian alone (NH)	0	0	0.00%	0.00%
Pacific Islander alone (NH)	0	0	0.00%	0.00%
Some Other Race alone (NH)	0	3	0.00%	0.37%
Mixed Race or Multi-Racial (NH)	7	11	0.82%	1.36%
Hispanic or Latino (any race)	8	11	0.93%	1.36%
Total	858	806	100.00%	100.00%

=== 2000 Census ===
As of the census of 2000, there were 1,014 people, 361 households, and 266 families residing in the town. The population density was 65.6 inhabitants per square mile (25.3/km^{2}). There were 398 housing units at an average density of 25.7 per square mile (9.9/km^{2}). The racial makeup of the town was 98.03% Black or African American, 1.38% White, 0.10% Native American, 0.20% Asian, and 0.30% from two or more races. 0.79% of the population were Hispanic or Latino of any race.

There were 361 households, out of which 40.4% had children under the age of 18 living with them, 33.5% were married couples living together, 35.7% had a female householder with no husband present, and 26.3% were non-families. 23.5% of all households were made up of individuals, and 10.8% had someone living alone who was 65 years of age or older. The average household size was 2.81 and the average family size was 3.33.

In the town, the population was spread out, with 32.4% under the age of 18, 10.1% from 18 to 24, 25.7% from 25 to 44, 20.8% from 45 to 64, and 10.9% who were 65 years of age or older. The median age was 31 years. For every 100 females, there were 77.0 males. For every 100 females age 18 and over, there were 70.8 males.

The median income for a household in the town was $18,158, and the median income for a family was $21,875. Males had a median income of $20,885 versus $18,125 for females. The per capita income for the town was $10,062. About 29.4% of families and 31.7% of the population were below the poverty line, including 35.8% of those under age 18 and 47.5% of those age 65 or over.

== Notable people ==
- Ben Wallace, NBA basketball player

== See also ==
- Battle of Holy Ground
