= George Coulter House =

Historic house in Alabama, United States

- U.S. National Register of Historic Places
- Alabama Register of Landmarks and Heritage
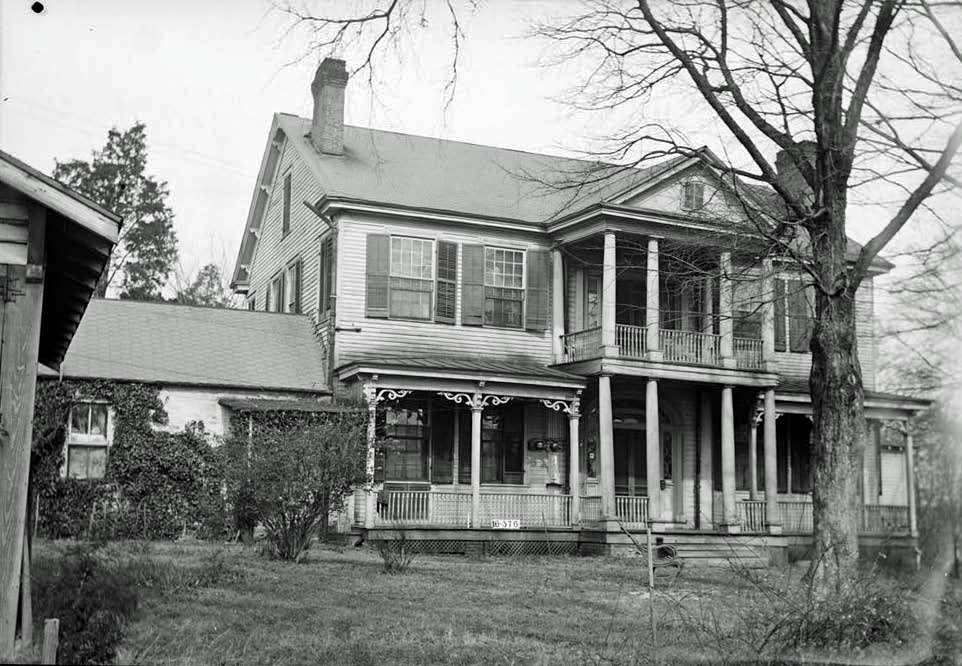
- Original building in 1932

- Location within Alabama Location within the United States
- Location: 420 S. Pine St., Florence, Alabama
- Coordinates: 34°47′46″N 87°40′32″W
- Area: less than one acre
- Built: c. 1827
- Architectural style: Federal
- NRHP reference No.: 82002046

Significant dates
- Added to NRHP: January 21, 1982
- Designated ARLH: October 19, 1979

The George Coulter House (also known as Mapleton) is a historic house located at 420 South Pine Street in Florence, Alabama.

== Description and history ==
The house was built in about 1827 by George Coulter, a planter, lawyer, and soldier originally from Middle Tennessee. During the Civil War, the house was used as a command post by Union Army Colonel John Marshall Harlan, partially due to its location on a hillside overlooking downtown and the Tennessee River. The house was later owned by W. W. Slaton, who renovated the house in the late 1940s, adding a wing that was originally used as medical offices. The frame house is designed in Federal style, with Adamesque woodwork throughout the interior. Narrow two-level porticoes with Tuscan order columns on the north and south faces were replaced in the 1940s by porticoes with a pair of square columns and a central balcony. The original brick kitchen was formerly connected to the house via a covered breezeway which has since been enclosed.

The house was listed on the Alabama Register of Landmarks and Heritage in 1979, and the National Register of Historic Places on January 21, 1982.
