= Donnelly House and Gardens =

Donnelly House
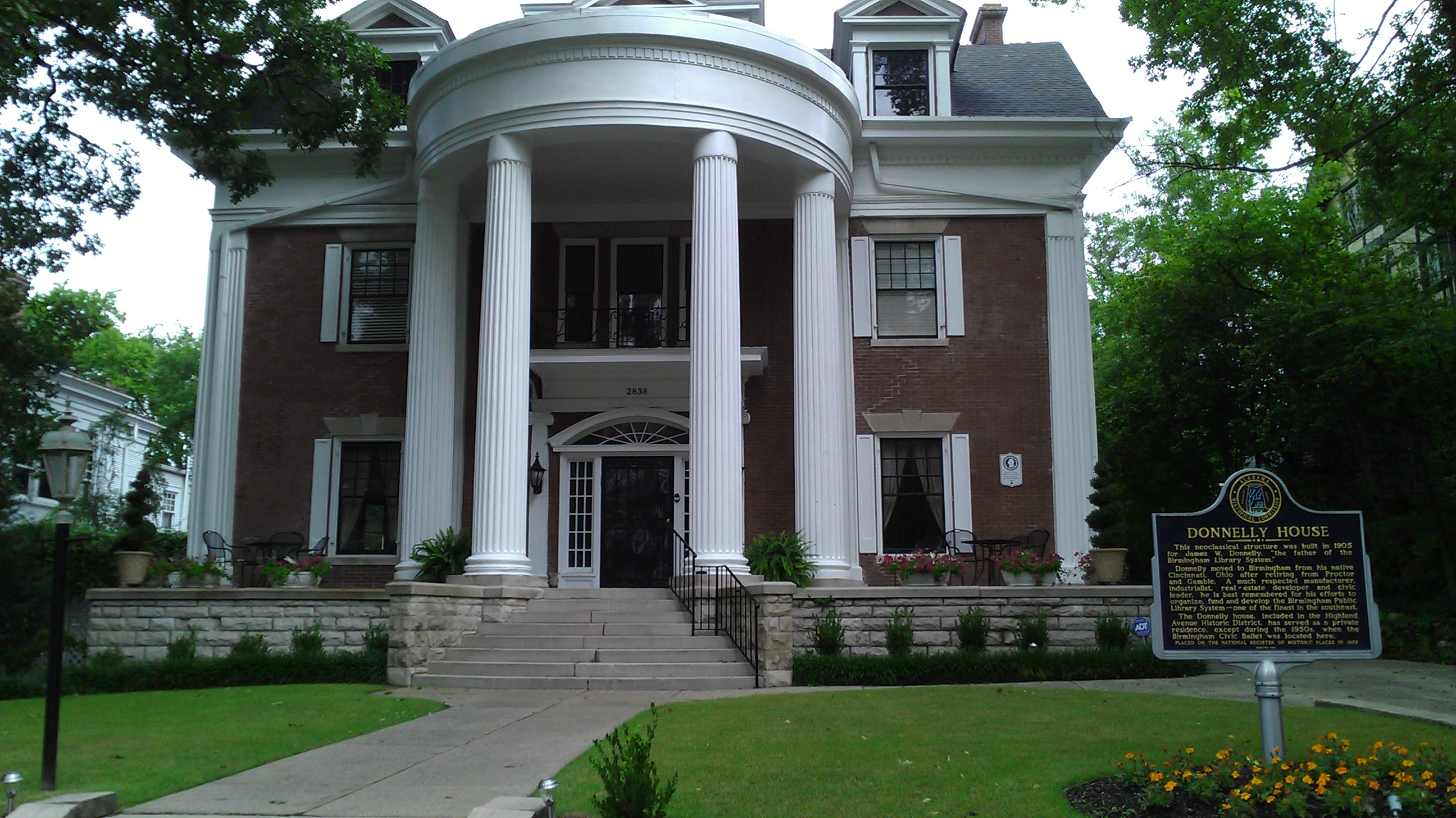

- Location within Alabama
- 33.50625°N 86.78289°W
- Location: Birmingham, Alabama

History
- Founded: 1905

Site notes
- Architectural style: Classical Revival

Alabama Register of Landmarks and Heritage
- Official name: Donnelly House
- Designated: May 20, 1975

The historic Donnelly House, an example of Neo-classical architecture, was built in 1905 as the residence of James W. Donnelly. Mr. Donnelly was an industrialist, manufacturer, real-estate developer, philanthropist, and civic leader. After retiring from Procter & Gamble in Cincinnati, he moved south to Birmingham, where this magnificent Georgian-colonial mansion had been constructed, featuring over 12,000 square feet (1,100 m^{2}) of living space and spectacular white marble floors.

While the Donnelly House has served primarily as a private residence, it was also the home of the Birmingham Civic Ballet during the 1950s. Ultimately, the home was opened as a venue for weddings, business meetings and other activities.

The house was purchased by Carl Schoettlin in 2011. The house was fully renovated by Schoettlin Building Company. Currently the house is an entertainment venue specializing in weddings, receptions, parties, etc. The house is managed by Carl Schoettlin.

The home was listed on the Alabama Register of Landmarks and Heritage on May 20, 1975. It is also a contributing property to the Highland Avenue Historic District, a historic district on the National Register of Historic Places.

== See also ==
- National Register of Historic Places listings in Jefferson County, Alabama
