= Peter F. Armistead Sr. House =

Historic house in Alabama, United States

Coordinates: 34°50′28″N 87°44′24″W

- Peter F. Armistead Sr.
- U.S. National Register of Historic Places
- Alabama Register of Landmarks and Heritage
- Location within Alabama Location within the United States
- Nearest city: Florence, Alabama
- Area: 30 acres (12 ha)
- Built: 1825
- Architectural style: Tidewater Cottage
- MPS: Tidewater Cottages in the Tennessee Valley TR
- NRHP reference No.: 86001540

Significant dates
- Added to NRHP: July 9, 1986
- Designated ARLH: October 11, 1978

The Peter F. Armistead Sr. House is a historic residence near Florence, Alabama. The land was purchased by Peter Fontaine Armistead in 1818, with the house built around 1825. The exterior is a near copy of Armistead's home in Culpeper County, Virginia, "Glen Ella". Thomas S. Broadfoot purchased the house in 1877, who sold it to Howard Wright in 1935. The house underwent restoration in the 1970s. The house is five bays wide, with steps leading up to a narrow, flat-roofed entry portico. There are three dormer windows protruding from the gable roof on the front and rear. The interior is laid out in a double-pile configuration, with a parlor behind the front stair hall. A kitchen wing was added to the northwest rear in the 1970s. The house was listed on the Alabama Register of Landmarks and Heritage in 1978 and the National Register of Historic Places in 1986.
