= Sannoner Historic District =

Historic district in Alabama, United States

- U.S. National Register of Historic Places
- U.S. Historic district
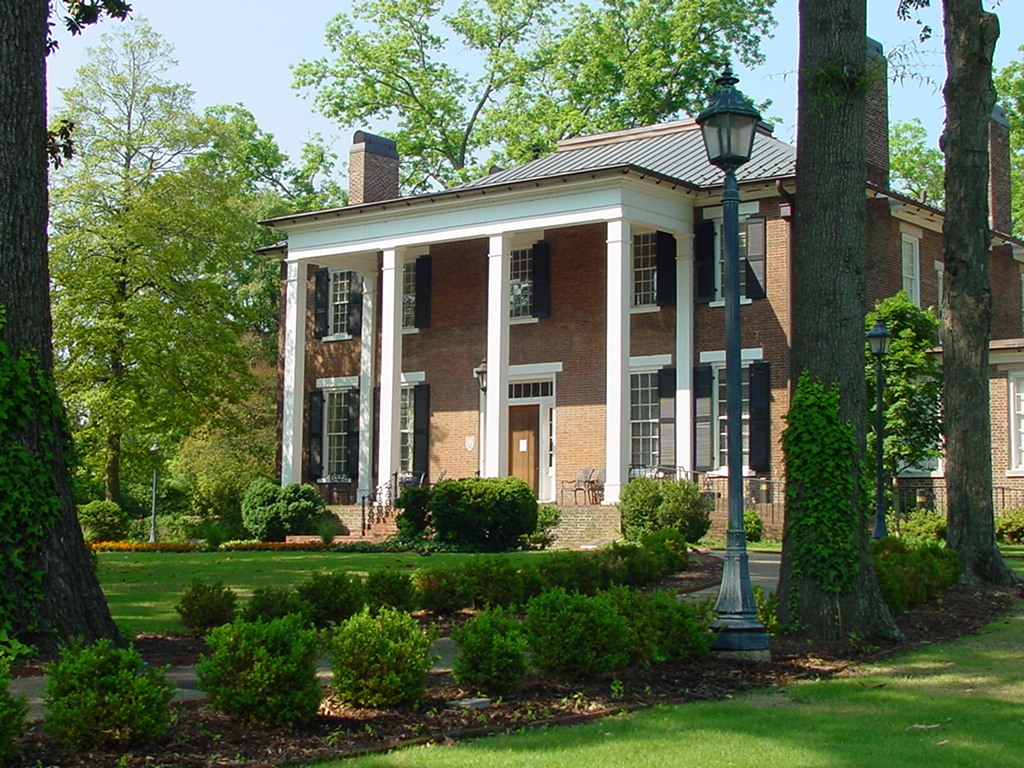
- Coby Hall, now owned by the University of North Alabama

- Location within Alabama Location within the United States
- Location: Includes both sides of N. Pine and N. Court from Tuscaloosa Ave. to University of North Alabama, Florence, Alabama
- Coordinates: 34°48′14″N 87°40′45″W
- Area: 25 acres (10 ha)
- Built: 1825
- Architect: Multiple
- Architectural style: Greek Revival, Late Victorian, Federal
- NRHP reference No.: 76000336
- Added to NRHP: January 1, 1976

The Sannoner Historic District is a historic district in Florence, Alabama. The district lies between downtown Florence and the University of North Alabama and is named for Ferdinand Sannoner, who surveyed the new town in 1818. In the first half of the 19th century, many wealthy merchants, planters, and lawyers built their homes in the neighborhood. Wakefield, believed to be the first brick house in Florence, was built in 1825 in Federal style by an operator of a brick yard. Governors Edward A. O'Neal and Emmet O'Neal, as well as the son of Governor Hugh McVay all made their homes in the district. Emmet O'Neal's house, Courtview, is the centerpiece of the district; the Greek Revival mansion is situated on a hill at the end of Court Street.

After the Civil War and Reconstruction, Florence underwent a series of economic booms in the late 19th and early 20th centuries. Several Victorian houses were built before the turn of the century, as well as the Gothic Revival Trinity Episcopal Church. 20th century structures include houses in the bungalow, Neoclassical, and Tudor Revival styles, as well as a Spanish Colonial Revival office building at the downtown end of the district.

The district was listed on the National Register of Historic Places in 1976.
