= Joinerville, Texas =

Unincorporated community in Texas, United States

- Unincorporated community
- Location within the state of Texas Joinerville, Texas (the United States)
- Coordinates: 32°10′41″N 94°54′03″W
- Country: United States
- State: Texas
- County: Rusk
- Elevation: 443 ft (135 m)

Population (2000)
  - Total: 140
- Time zone: UTC-6 (Central (CST))
  - Summer (DST): UTC-5 (CDT)
- ZIP codes: 75658
- Area codes: 903, 430
- GNIS feature ID: 1378500

Joinerville is an unincorporated community in East Texas. It is located in western Rusk County, Texas, United States approximately seven miles west of the city of Henderson.

Joinerville, Texas, during the oil boom of the 1930s

== History ==
The community was originally called Cyril, and then Miller or Miller Schoolhouse for either Andrew or John Cherry Miller. The latter owned seven enslaved persons and donated 1,000 acres (400 ha) of land for the Juan Ximenes Survey before the Civil War. The community is also located near the site of a former Cherokee Indian village.

In 1930, the name was officially changed to "Joinerville", in honor of Columbus Marion Joiner, the wildcatter who discovered the East Texas Oil Field. The dirt road to the discovery well, Daisy Bradford No. 3, intersected the Henderson-Tyler highway at Joinerville.

During the oil-boom years that followed 1930, men and families flocked to East Texas to find work in the oilfields and Joinerville's population rose to 1,500. During the 1930s, the town had thirty-five businesses and a new post office (established in 1931 with Esther L. Berry as the first postmistress).

By 1940, oil production had peaked and the town's population quickly dropped to just 500. Over the decade that followed, the number of residents continued its downward trend to 350 and the number of reported businesses dropped to just four. After a slight upswing during the 1950s and 1960s, the population again fell greatly. From 1980 through 2000, Joinerville reported just 140 residents and four businesses.

By 1950, while the existing oil wells continued to pump 20 years after the discovery of the oilfield (many still pumping to this day), the need to drill new wells had long passed. As work dried up, most families left Joinerville. Over 20 years, Joinerville transitioned from a boomtown to a ghost town. Most of its original buildings are gone.

== The Gaston School ==
The Gaston School was built in 1925 due to a merger between two existing schools - Miller and Mount Hope. Irene Gaston, a teacher at the Mount Hope school, donated the land on which the new school was built, and it was named Gaston after Irene and her husband Hugh.

The campus was established near or on the Miller farm. It had four teachers employed in the 1929-1930 school year. It then had 20 teachers educating 801 students in the fall of 1931.

The school was originally built to house 80 pupils. Following the discovery of oil and the expansion of Cyril, it was considerably expanded. In 1932, the Henderson Daily News referred to it as "the largest rural school in the world". The rebuilt school featured ten buildings, expansive sports facilities, and striking walls of native rock surrounding the campus.

On Friday, January 28, 1955, Elvis Presley performed at the Gaston School Auditorium. The show was sponsored by the High School Band and the Band Parents Booster Club and earned $95 for the band's summer trip.

The school merged with New London in 1965 to form the West Rusk County Consolidated Independent School District, and the school buildings are no longer in use, although they are still standing.

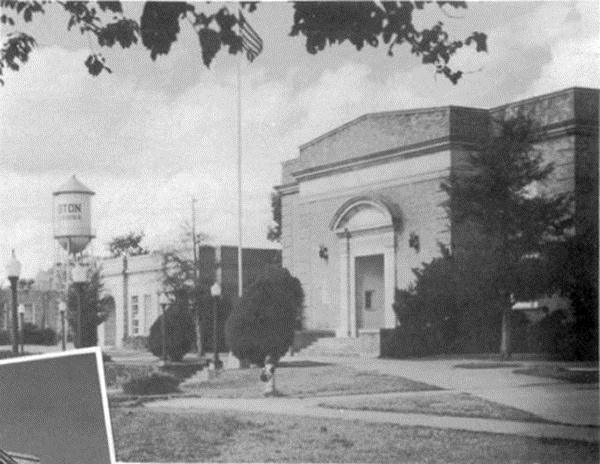
Gaston School Auditorium in the 1950s

== Cyril, Texas, becomes Joinerville ==
In about 1930, the community of Cyril was renamed "Joinerville" to honor Columbus Marion "Dad" Joiner, an American oilman. A.D. ("Doc") Lloyd, a self-educated, self-proclaimed geologist, discovered the largest oil field in the world up to that time, the East Texas Oilfield, just outside Joinerville, in western Rusk County, Texas.

== Columbus Marion "Dad" Joiner ==
=== The early years ===
Columbus Marion Joiner (March 12, 1860 – March 27, 1947) was born on a farm in 1860 near Center Star in Lauderdale County, Alabama.

When he was just five years old, his father, a soldier in the Confederate Army, was killed at the Battle of Jackson, Mississippi.

Joiner later moved to Tennessee, and at age 23, Joiner established a law practice there. He was elected to the Tennessee state legislature from 1889 to 1891.

Joiner subsequently moved to the Ardmore, Oklahoma, area in 1897 in search of inexpensive land. By 1906, he had purchased 12,000 acres of farmland. However, due to some dubious business decisions, Joiner lost his land during the Panic of 1907. He then sought to reverse his losses in the Oklahoma oilfields as a wildcatter and drilled the first of about 100 wells in Seminole, Oklahoma, in 1913.

In 1926, at the age of 66, Joiner decided to move south, to Texas, believing there was oil in Rusk County, though geologists advised him otherwise. In the summer of 1927, Joiner, now 67 years old, took mineral leases on several thousand acres of Texas land, intending to sell certificates of interest. As part of that, he leased the 975-acre farm of a widow, Daisy Bradford, near Joinerville.

=== The Daisy Bradford No. 1 and No. 2 ===
Joiner and his driller Tom M. Jones spudded the Bradford No. 1 on an 80-acre tract belonging to Bradford in the Juan Ximenes Survey of Rusk County. After drilling for six months with no oil findings, the hole was lost to a stuck pipe, at about 1,098 feet.

Joiner abandoned the well, and then on April 14, 1928, he formed another syndicate from another lease block of 500 acres and sold certificates of interest. This financed his second well, known as the Bradford No. 2, spudded by Joiner and driller Bill Osborne, 100 feet northwest of the No. 1.

Joiner's certificates again were bartered for supplies and labor, openly accepted as a medium of exchange in the poor Rusk County economy. After eleven months of intermittent drilling, the Bradford No. 2 reached a depth of 2,518 feet at which point the drill pipe twisted off and blocked the hole.

Some people claimed - perhaps with good reason - that Joiner was an old con artist and that his flimsy drilling equipment (consisting mostly of rusty pipes and a sawmill boiler for power) was merely a prop to scam investors.

=== The Daisy Bradford No. 3 ===
On May 8, 1929, driller Ed Laster moved the rig to a new location, 375 feet from the second site, and spudded Bradford No. 3.

On September 5, 1930, Joiner and his team made history. Up to this point, no one was yet aware that the largest oilfield in the world was sitting, untouched, in East Texas, right under Joiner's feet. His third well, the "Daisy Bradford No. 3", struck "black gold" in the Woodbine sand at 3592 feet on a drill stem test. The initial production was 300 barrels per day and the well was completed on October 5, 1930.

The well is located on CR 4136, on the west side of Miller Lake, and is accessible from Texas Highway 64 to the south. Today, the site has a historical marker and the original well is located about 100 feet from the marker off the road. It continues to pump oil to this day.

The original well was purchased by H.L. Hunt from C.M. "Dad" Joiner in November 1930. The original well was owned by Hunt Oil until it sold all interests in legacy oil, natural gas, and natural gas liquids assets in East Texas and North Louisiana to Vanguard Natural Resources LLC, effective June 1, 2014.

=== Legal Trouble for "Dad" Joiner ===
Not long after he brought in the Daisy Bradford #3, Joiner was in legal trouble for grossly overselling shares in his venture. Just two months after striking it big, he went into receivership and was forced to sell his holdings to Haroldson L. "H.L" Hunt, of Hunt Oil, for $1.34 million. After 1940, Joiner retired to Dallas, to live out his days.

== Realization of the size of the East Texas Oilfield ==
By early spring of 1931, it became evident that the new wells in the area were not from small, widely spaced pockets of oil in separate fields, but from one vast field stretching for dozens of miles. It was learned that all the new wells were drawing oil from the same Woodbine sands.

This giant East Texas Oilfield extended into parts of Smith, Upshur, Gregg, Cherokee, and Rusk counties, ultimately with 30,340 historic and active oil wells. Its size is roughly 45 miles north-south, and 5 miles wide. It became the largest oil field in the U.S. outside of Alaska at the time.

The rapid proliferation of drilling led to overproduction and crashing oil prices from $1.10 a barrel in 1930 to 10 cents a barrel in 1931. The resulting glut helped destabilize the US oil market in the early 1930s and hurt the international economy, thus deepening the Depression. In August 1931, the wildcatters and oil companies in East Texas were out of control, so Governor Sterling of Texas ordered the National Guard into the oil fields to bring order. Later the legislature created legal pro-rations to regulate oil production and stabilize the market.

The East Texas Oilfield became even more important with the advent of World War II. The construction of the 1,400-mile "Big Inch" pipeline from Texas to the refineries in Pennsylvania, was a key element in supplying the allied troops with an ample supply of petroleum products.

Today the East Texas Oilfield, discovered near Joinerville, remains the largest oilfield in the United States, outside of Alaska.

== Gaston Museum ==
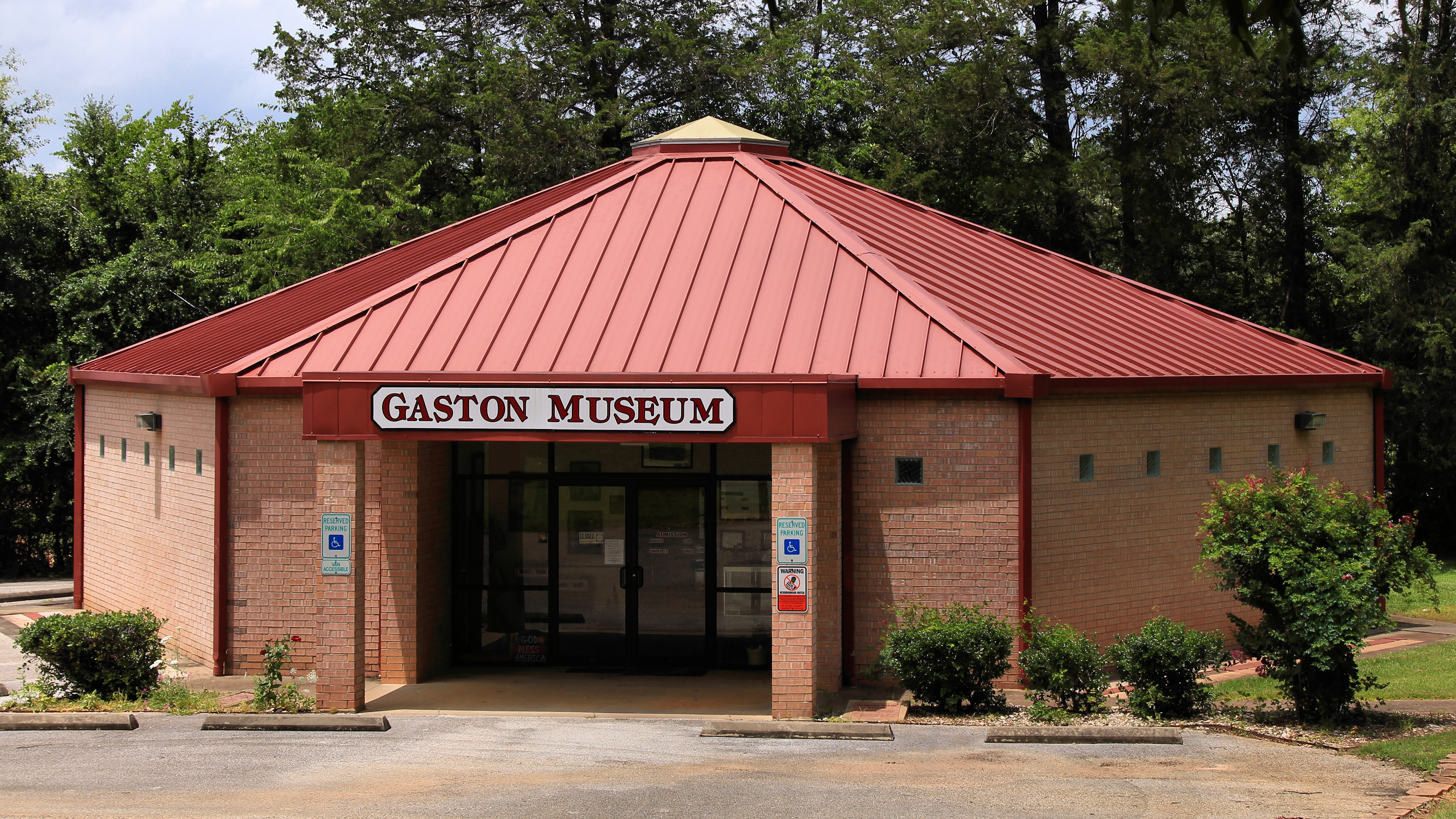
The Gaston Museum

Located in Joinerville, Texas, the Gaston Museum presents life in the East Texas Oil Field from the 1930s through the 1960s. The museum's exhibit building, designed by Charles Croft, was dedicated and occupied in June 2005. With the only known surviving Tent House, museum visitors may truly step back in time and see how people lived during the 1930 oil boom.

The Gaston Museum has memorabilia from the boom era, family history, an antique radio display with original equipment, original equipment from 1930's radio repair shop, Gaston School, businesses, and churches, and honors local veterans with a wall of honor.

The East Texas Oil Field's discovery well, The Daisy Bradford #3, is located 2.2 miles from the museum.

== Notable people ==
- Adrian Burk, football quarterback, went to school in Joinerville.
- Charlie Waller, bluegrass musician, was born in Joinerville.
