= Loxahatchee =

Loxahatchee may refer to:

- Loxahatchee, Florida
- Loxahatchee River, Florida
- Battles of the Loxahatchee in the Second Seminole War
- Loxahatchee National Wildlife Refuge, Florida
