= St Florian =

St Florian can refer to:

== People ==
- Saint Florian (died c. 304), patron saint of Linz, Austria; chimney sweeps; soapmakers; and firefighters
- Florinus of Remüs (died 856), also known as Florian of Chur

== Places ==
- St. Florian, Alabama, United States
- Sankt Florian, Austria
