= Stewartville, Alabama =

Stewartville, Alabama may refer to:

- Stewartville, Coosa County, Alabama, a census-designated place
- Stewartville, Lauderdale County, Alabama, an unincorporated community
