= Columbus Marion Joiner =

American politician (1860–1947)

Columbus Marion "Dad" Joiner

Member of the Tennessee House of Representatives
- In office 1889–1891

Personal details
- Born: March 12, 1860 Center Star, Alabama, U.S.
- Died: March 27, 1947 (aged 87) Dallas, Texas, U.S.
- Resting place: Sparkman Hillcrest Memorial Park in Dallas
- Spouse(s): (1) Lydia Ann Beaver Joiner (married 1882) (2) Dea England Joiner (married 1933)
- Children: John Lee, James Bert, Willie Mae, Vernon Snow, Frances Sue, Martha Marie, Ruby Nell, Mary Louise
- Parent(s): James and Lucy Joiner
- Education: Self-educated
- Occupation: Lawyer; Oilman

Columbus Marion Joiner, nicknamed Dad Joiner (March 12, 1860 – March 27, 1947), was an American politician and oilman who at the age of seventy drilled the discovery well of the East Texas Oil Field of the 1930s. Newspaper articles referred to Joiner as the Daddy of the Rusk County Oil Field.

== Early life and career ==
Joiner was born in 1860 in Lauderdale County, Alabama. His father was killed in 1864 during the American Civil War, and his mother died in 1868. He had only seven weeks of formal schooling. Tutored at home by his sister, he was taught to read using the Bible, their only book. He learned to write by copying text from the Book of Genesis.

Joiner left home in 1877, but returned in 1881 to marry and start a dry goods store in Muscle Shoals, Alabama. In 1883, he entered into the practice of law in Tennessee and was from 1889 to 1891 a member of the Tennessee House of Representatives. He relocated in 1897 to Ardmore in the southern Oklahoma Territory, where he farmed and handled leases for the Choctaw Nation of Oklahoma, but lost all of his assets in the Panic of 1907.

== Oil drilling ==
Joiner, 1877, age 17, shortly after leaving home

Joiner and former druggist, physician, and amateur geologist A. D. Lloyd (his original name was Joseph Idelbert Durham) teamed up to drill two test wells, barely missing out on discovering the Seminole and Cement oil fields. Joiner then commuted to Rusk County from 1921 to 1925, before moving to Dallas, Texas, in 1925, where he focused on selling some of his Rusk County leases to recent widows. On 11 August 1925, Joiner obtained a lease on widow Daisy Bradford's 975.5 acre farm, and moved to Rusk County proper in 1926.

=== East Texas Oil Field ===
In 1927, A. D. "Doc" Lloyd convinced Joiner to drill for oil in East Texas, predicting a well would encounter the Woodbine at a depth of 3,550 feet (1,080 m). Joiner mailed out a prospectus written by Lloyd to seek financing for his wildcatting. After collecting enough financial backing, Joiner began drilling in Rusk County. Joiner and his crew drilled for three years beginning in 1927 with rusted, third-hand equipment. At one point, the Texas Company geologist Walter R. Smith visited and joked, "I'll drink every barrel of oil you get out of that hole." Despite the opposition, Joiner was convinced of the possibility of oil in Rusk County. Other wildcatters who drilled near the narrow but long East Texas field included Michael Late Benedum and Joe Trees, part of the Pittsburgh oil establishment, and Clem S. Clarke, an oilman and Republican politician from Shreveport, Louisiana.

Beginning in 1930, Joiner began to drill eight miles west of Henderson, Texas, on the farm of Daisy Bradford. Using a flimsy pine rig and battered tools, his first two wells were unsuccessful. Eventually, at 8 p.m. on October 3, 1930, the Daisy Bradford Number 3 struck oil. The ensuing gusher sent the area into a frenzy.

Joiner and Lloyd had discovered the East Texas field, the largest petroleum deposit yet found at that time. Based in five counties, it was centered about western Rusk County. Yet, Joiner had oversold interest in all three wells he drilled on the Daisy Bradford farm, and later sold everything for $1.335 million to H. L. Hunt.

Joiner was nicknamed "Dad" because he was the father of the oil strike.

== Later life ==
The town of Joinerville in western Rusk County is named in his honor. He died in 1947.
