= Edward Frederick Leitner =

- Born: February 4, 1812; Stuttgart, Kingdom of Württemberg
- Died: January 15, 1838 (aged 25); Near Jupiter Inlet, Florida, United States
- Education: University of Tübingen; Medical University of South Carolina
- Occupation: Botanist; Physician
- Known for: Researching plant life in South Florida
- Military career
- Allegiance: United States
- Conflicts: Second Seminole War; First Battle of the Loxahatchee †

Edward Frederick Leitner, also Friedrich August Ludwig Leitner (February 4, 1812 – January 15, 1838) was a German botanist, naturalist and physician. A pioneer of botany and a friend and correspondent of J. J. Audubon and John Bachman, he was active among South Carolina naturalists and in the scholarly circles of Charleston. He was killed in Florida during the Seminole Wars after volunteering to be a combat medic.

== Life and work ==
Audubon's plate 411, the caption for the flower reads "Nymphea flava Leitner"

Frederick Leitner was born in Stuttgart on February 4, 1812 to Johann Friedrich Leitner and Karoline Friedericke Bühler. His father was a gardener in the court of King Frederick I of Württemberg. His paternal grandfather was a barber-surgeon in Eckersdorf. At the age of four, his family moved to his mother's town of Schorndorf after the death of his father. He attended botany lectures of Gustav Schübler at the University of Tübingen. He likely worked at the gardens of Ensiedel. Although not a student of the university, he passed the exams of medical botany, agricultural chemistry, economic botany, plant physiology and statistics of Württemberg. He received a subsidy from the Society for Natural Science in Württemberg and left to the US in 1831 and found German friends with natural history interests in Charleston, South Carolina. In 1831, Leitner began taking classes at the Medical College of South Carolina in Charleston, under J. E. Holbrook. John Bachman became a friend and supporter. In 1832, he befriended the famous naturalist John James Audubon while he was visiting Charleston. Audubon labelled a water lily as Nymphaea flava Leitner in his painting of a swan. The species is now known to be Nymphaea mexicana. In 1833, Leitner began to travel to Florida and collect botanical and zoological specimens in the Everglades. During his travels he eventually reached the Florida Keys, during which, he paid a visit to the Dry Tortugas. In 1834, he graduated from medical college with a dissertation on Hippomane mancinella, subsequently working as a lecturer at the South Carolina Medical Society. He also gave public lectures on botany which were attended by many including several women. He also studied various poisonous plants including sumac, poison oak and the vine Hippomane mancinella and Excoecaria agallocha.

The Seminole War that began in December 1835 obstructed Leitner's research in Florida, as the region had become a dangerous war zone. Leitner planned to join a U.S. Military unit, as it was the only way he could still travel through Florida and continue his research. In 1836, he traveled to Key West, where he joined Navy officer Levin M. Powell's unit as a guide and surgeon. On 15 January 1838, he was killed by Seminole warriors at the First Battle of the Loxahatchee. It was reported in a newspaper that he was likely targeted by the Seminoles because of his role as a combat medic. As he lay injured he requested that the others take care of themselves. His body was never recovered after the battle.

At the time of Leitner's death, he was considered one of the world's leading experts on Florida's nature. After his death, 800 of his specimens eventually came into the possession of Jean Louis Cabanis in Germany, however these specimens were completely destroyed during the Bombing of Berlin in 1943. The genus Leitneria is named in his honor, as is the family Leitneriaceae, the latter taxa being circumscribed by George Bentham.

== Publications associated with Leitner ==
- "Edward Frederick Leitner (1812-1838), Physician-botanist", by George Edmund Gifford (1972).
