= Rhodesville, Alabama =

Unincorporated community in Alabama, United States

- Unincorporated community
- Location within Alabama Location within the United States
- Coordinates: 34°52′20″N 87°52′14″W
- Country: United States
- State: Alabama
- County: Lauderdale
- Elevation: 581 ft (177 m)
- Time zone: UTC-6 (Central (CST))
  - Summer (DST): UTC-5 (CDT)
- Area codes: 256 & 938
- GNIS feature ID: 156960

Rhodesville, also known as Rhodes Mill, is an unincorporated community in Lauderdale County, in the U.S. state of Alabama.

== History ==
Rhodesville is named for the Rhodes family, who were early settlers of the area from Newberry County, South Carolina. Spencer Rhodes operated a store, blacksmith shop, and mill in Rhodesville. A post office was in operation under the name Rhodesville from 1889 to 1907.
