= Grassy, Lauderdale County, Alabama =

Unincorporated community in Alabama, United States

Grassy, Alabama
- Unincorporated community
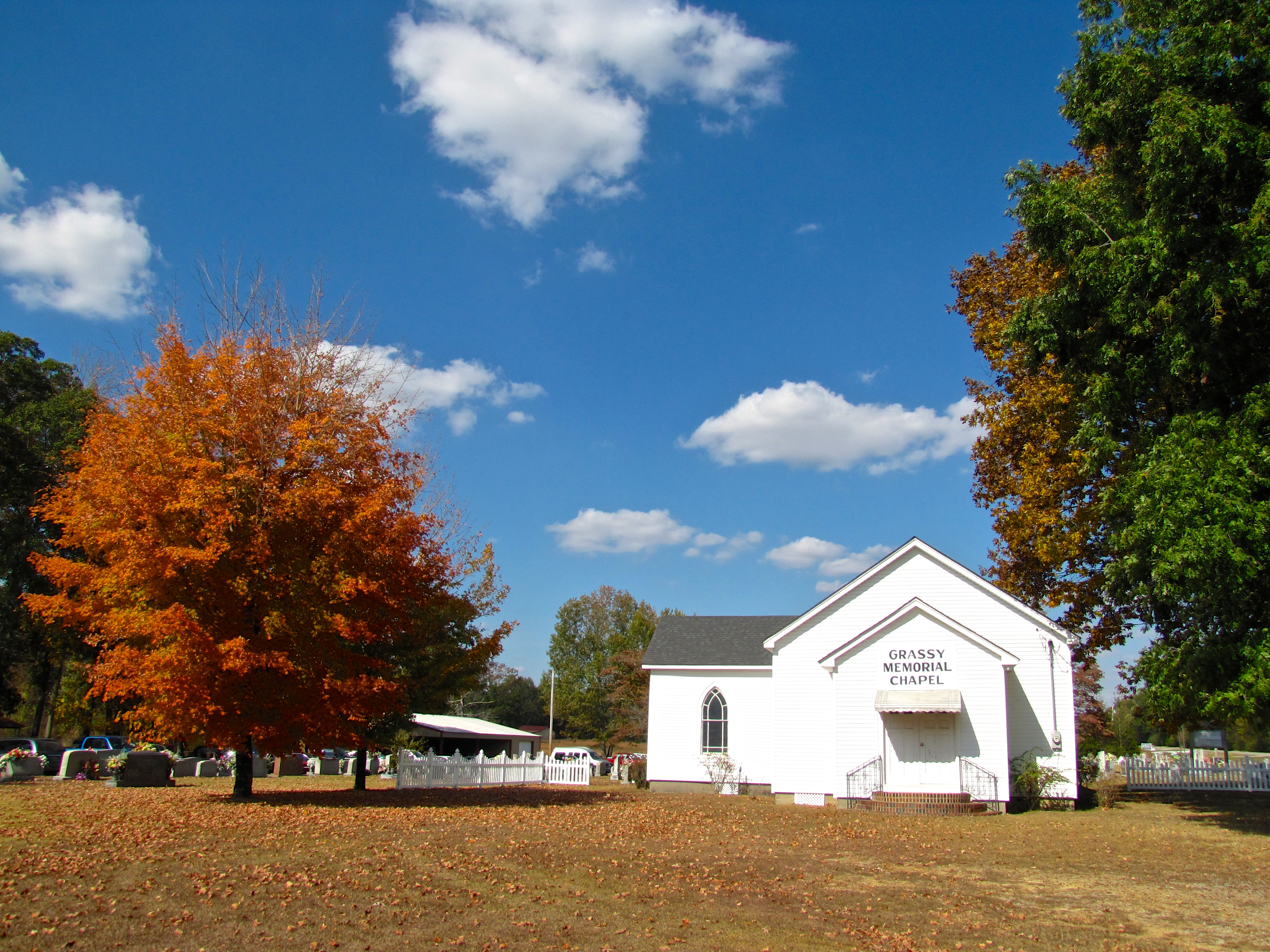
- Grassy Memorial Chapel

- Location within Alabama Location within the United States
- Coordinates: 34°58′17″N 87°17′59″W
- Country: United States
- State: Alabama
- County: Lauderdale
- Elevation: 787 ft (240 m)
- Time zone: UTC-6 (Central (CST))
  - Summer (DST): UTC-5 (CDT)
- Area codes: 256 & 938
- GNIS feature ID: 156430

Grassy, also known as Arthur or New Salem, is an unincorporated community in Lauderdale County, in the U.S. state of Alabama. It is concentrated around the intersection of State Route 64 and County Highway 89, east of Lexington, northwest of Anderson, and just south of the Tennessee border.

== History ==
Grassy took its name in the 1870s from the local Grassy School; the school was so named for the condition of its grassy schoolyard. A post office operated under the name Arthur from 1886 to 1907.

Grassy Memorial Chapel, which lies near the center of the community, was established in 1894 as the New Salem Presbyterian Church. The chapel and its associated cemetery became the property of the Grassy community in 1976.
