= Wright, Alabama =

Unincorporated community in Alabama, United States

- Unincorporated community
- Location within Alabama Location within the United States
- Coordinates: 34°54′31″N 87°59′24″W
- Country: United States
- State: Alabama
- County: Lauderdale
- Elevation: 453 ft (138 m)
- Time zone: UTC-6 (Central (CST))
  - Summer (DST): UTC-5 (CDT)
- Area codes: 256 & 938
- GNIS feature ID: 154037

Wright, also known as Wrights Cross Roads, is an unincorporated community in Lauderdale County, in the U.S. state of Alabama.

== History ==
Wright was named for Moses Wright, a post rider on the Natchez Trace, who settled in the area and cleared timber for farming. His family operated a general store. In 1900, Wright was home to three stores, a mill, and cotton gin, and was a center of cross tie production. A post office was in operation under the name Wright from 1891 to 1914.
