= Mars Hill, Alabama =

Unincorporated community in Alabama, United States

- Neighborhood
- Location within Alabama Location within the United States
- Coordinates: 34°51′06″N 87°39′39″W
- Country: United States
- State: Alabama
- County: Lauderdale
- Elevation: 554 ft (169 m)
- Time zone: UTC-6 (Central (CST))
  - Summer (DST): UTC-5 (CDT)
- Area codes: 256 & 938
- GNIS feature ID: 156659

Mars Hill is a former unincorporated community that is now a neighborhood of the city of Florence in Lauderdale County, Alabama, United States.

The community contains the campus of Mars Hill Bible School.

== History ==
The community was named after Mars Hill (Areopagus), in Ancient Greece. The community was once home to the Wright and Rice Iron Foundry. The foundry began operating in 1835 and manufactured various kinds of machinery and equipment. During the American Civil War, the 7th Illinois Volunteer Infantry Regiment camped at the site of the foundry. The foundry produced various weapons for the Confederacy during the war. It was destroyed in May 1863. In 1888, a passenger station of the Louisville & Nashville Railroad was at Mars Hill.

== Notable person ==
Hugh McVay, ninth governor of Alabama.
