= USRC Washington (1832) =

- A Morris-Taney class Revenue Cutter

History
- Name: USRC Washington
- Namesake: George Washington
- Builder: Webb and Allen, New York
- Launched: 1832
- Commissioned: 1832
- Decommissioned: June 1837
- Homeport: Mobile, Alabama; Key West, Florida
- Fate: Sold, 1837

General characteristics
- Class & type: Morris-Taney class cutter
- Displacement: 112 long tons (114 t)
- Length: 73.4 ft (22.4 m)
- Beam: 20.6 ft (6.3 m)
- Draft: 9.7 ft (3.0 m) (aft)
- Propulsion: Wind
- Sail plan: Schooner
- Complement: 20-24
- Armament: 6x9 pndrs

The United States Revenue Cutter Washington, named for Founding Father and the first U.S. president George Washington, was one of the 13 cutters of the Morris-Taney class. These cutters were the backbone of the United States Revenue Cutter Service for more than a decade. Samuel Humphreys designed these cutters for roles as diverse as fighting pirates, privateers, combating smugglers and operating with naval forces. He designed the vessels on a naval schooner concept. They had Baltimore Clipper lines. The vessels built by Webb and Allen, designed by Isaac Webb, resembled Humphreys' but had one less port.

== Service history ==
=== 1833–1835 ===
The revenue cutter Washington was completed at New York City in 1832, initially operated out of Mobile, Alabama. She shifted to Key West, Florida, as her base of operations and spent a brief period of time at Charleston, South Carolina, undergoing repairs, before returning to Key West on 20 May 1835 and remaining based there for the remainder of the year.

=== Second Seminole War, 1835–1837 ===
On 28 December 1835, two companies of regular Army troops under the command of Major Francis L. Dade, were massacred by Seminole Indians. One badly wounded survivor managed to make a difficult 60-mile trek to the head of Tampa Bay, where he reported the disaster to the garrison commander at Fort Brooke, Florida, Captain Francis S. Belton. Fearing for the safety of his post, Belton immediately dispatched a request for reinforcements via the sloop Motto.

Belton's message reached Key West early in January. Meanwhile in the Federal capital, Levi Woodbury, the Secretary of the Treasury — who had also heard of Dade's disaster — directed Revenue Captain Ezekiel Jones, commanding Washington, to place his ship under Navy control "until otherwise directed." Jones did not receive this order — issued on 6 January 1836 — until he had already begun operations in cooperation with the Army and Navy.

Word of the massacre reached Jones on or about 11 January. Washington soon got underway and proceeded via Tampa Bay to Charlotte Harbor and arrived at Fort Brooke on 25 January. At 1700 that afternoon, the revenue cutter landed a pair of 12-pounder guns — with sufficient powder and shot for 35 rounds — along with 10 seamen under the command of Lieutenant L. B. Childs and a Lieutenant Clark, to cooperate with the Army garrison troops. Belton, expecting an imminent attack by the Seminoles, took the precaution of ordering noncombatants — mostly women and children — to take refuge on board the merchant ships in the harbor.

Washington, meanwhile, lay to with springs to her anchors and her decks cleared for battle. At that juncture, the sloop-of-war USS Vandalia, Master Commandant Thomas T. Webb, USN, (Note: The term "master commandant" would have been equivalent to the later term "commodore", which is an officer who is commanding a squadron, division, or other detachment of two or more ships.) in command, sailed from Pensacola, Florida escorting a small merchantman carrying a detachment of 57 marines under First Lieutenant Nathaniel S. Waldron, USMC. Vandalia and her mercantile consort reached Fort Brooke on 28 January.

With the arrival of Vandalia and Waldron's marines, Washington withdrew her landing force from the beach on 1 February. Three days later, the revenue cutter received orders to reconnoiter Charlotte Harbor, south of Tampa Bay; got underway on 5 February, and arrived at her assigned destination on the 8 February.

Under the command of Lieutenant Childs, a party of 13 men in two boats landed at 0800 on the island of Sanibel in search of Seminole dependents reported there. Finding none, however, they withdrew but sighted three canoes and 10 men on the opposite shore at 1500 that day. Going ashore again on 10 February, Washington's landing force ascertained that the 10 men and three canoes had been in the employ of a local friendly Spaniard that lived in the vicinity.

After the men returned to the ship, Washington shifted back to her previous anchorage near Fort Brooke, reaching there on 13 February. At 1230, men in the revenue cutter heard the reports of heavy guns to the southeast side of the bay and spotted two canoes full of Indians "who appeared to be retreating from the scene of action." Washington made sail and gave chase, firing a 12-pounder loaded with round shot. Anchoring at 1230, Washington dispatched all of her boats, with crews, to overtake the Indians, who eventually hove to under the threats of superior force. They turned out to be friendly, though, and were allowed to go on their way.

Captain Jones brought Washington back to Key West on 19 February to repair his ship. Such were the vagaries of long-distance communication that Jones only then received Secretary Woodbury's instructions of 6 January. The following day, Jones reported to the Secretary, "I have been cooperating since 11 January, having half my battery and crew on shore at Fort Brook (sic) a part of the time and have rendered such service as the emergency of the case required. I shall sail again for Tampa as soon as I can effect some necessary repairs.

On 16 March, Master Commandant Webb, the local senior officer present afloat, directed Washington to reconnoiter a reported Indian encampment in the neighborhood of the Manatee River. Late in the afternoon of that same day, 16 March, Jones landed a force of 25 men under the command of Lieutenant William Smith, USN, of Vandalia. By nightfall, the men had located the site of an encampment but found neither Indians nor cattle. Returning on board that evening, Washington again put the landing force on the beach on the morning of 17 March. With competent Indian guides, the party followed a fresh Indian and cattle trail 10 miles into the interior before they returned to the ship, again empty-handed.

Almost simultaneously, Seminole forces were reported to be in retreat in boats down the Pease River. Webb ordered Washington to Charlotte Harbor to blockade the river "so as to cut off most effectually all retreat to or communication with the glades of the south."

Sailing to that locale, Washington examined St. Joseph's Bay, Costa Islands, Mullet Key, and sundry other places in and about Tampa Bay. She also examined Charlotte Harbor and Charlotte Bay, together with the neighboring keys and inlets. On 28 and 29 March, a boat expedition in the charge of Lieutenant Smith saw an Indian encampment some 30 miles from the mouth of Tampa Bay. Hoping to learn the whereabouts of "hostiles," Smith and his two friendly Indian guides landed and invited a parley. Smith and his guides returned to the ship safely with no information as to any local Seminole strongholds in the area.

Washington, her sister revenue cutters Dallas and Dexter, and the sloop-of-war Vandalia continued to perform valuable services in cooperation with Army units against the Seminoles, on patrol duties into the spring of 1836. Washington subsequently sailed for Sarasota, Florida, and arrived there on 11 May, anchoring at the mouth of the bay. She dispatched a cutter — in charge of Lieutenant Childs — and brought out two Spaniards and about 20 women and children, all fleeing from hostile Seminoles in that area.

Washington and Dallas subsequently cruised off the coast of Florida in the Gulf of Mexico during most of June. Washington later carried dispatches from Governor Call to Master Commandant M. P. Mix in Concord — the ship that had relieved Vandalia — in early July, before she transported a company of Army volunteers from Pensacola to St. Marks. She also surveyed the rivers, inlets, and bars along that stretch of the Florida seaboard.

After operating in Pensacola Bay and Tampa Bay during most of August and September, Washington accompanied Vandalia from Pensacola to Key West, departing on 2 October 1836 for Cape Florida and New River. Their mission was to surprise and, if possible, to capture some 200 Seminoles — men, women, and children.

Embarked in Washington — now commanded by Revenue Captain Robert Day, USRM — were 50 seamen under the command of Lieutenant Smith and four midshipmen, as well as 95 marines under the command of Lieutenant Waldron and Second Lieutenant McNeill. To carry this expeditionary force, six boats and two schooners were employed with Washington and Vandalia to carry the force. Sent to Tampa Bay on 4 November after the expedition had gotten underway, Washington delivered provisions from Tampa Bay to Cape Sable on 15 November. The revenue cutter subsequently sailed for Key West, arriving on 8 December.

A party of men from Washington, under the command of Lieutenant Levin M. Powell, USN surveyed the coast around New River from Cape Sable to Charlotte Harbor and, while he penetrated 15 miles into the trackless Everglades, found no Indians during their trip. Commodore Alexander Dallas, in overall command of the naval forces operating in the Seminole War, highly commended Powell and his men, citing their "perseverance and exertions under circumstances of privation and exposure ... in open boats."

Eventually, by the spring of 1837, the pace of operations began to tell upon Washington, and she was released by Commodore Dallas. Needing extensive repairs, she sailed to Baltimore, arriving on 22 May 1837 and the Government sold the Washington in June 1837.
