= James Lauderdale =

American militia officer (1768–1814)

- Born: September 6, 1768; Botetourt County, Virginia
- Died: December 23, 1814 (aged 46); Chalmette, Louisiana
- Relatives: William Lauderdale (brother)
- Military career
- Allegiance: United States
- Branch: Tennessee Militia
- Rank: Lieutenant-Colonel
- Battles: Creek War; Battle of Tallushatchee; Battle of Talladega; War of 1812; Battle of Villeré's Plantation †

James Lauderdale (1768–1814) was an American militia officer who fought in the Creek War. In 1813, he joined a unit of cavalry militia under General John Coffee, commissioned as a Lieutenant-Colonel of Volunteers in the Tennessee Militia.

== Early life ==
James Lauderdale was born in Botetourt County, Virginia, in 1768 to James Lauderdale and Sara Mills. A surveyor by trade, he moved with his father's family to present day Trousdale County in Middle Tennessee in the late 1790s. The older James was a veteran of the Revolutionary War and was paid for his service with land in the Tennessee territory.

== Military service ==
=== The Creek War ===
Lauderdale joined Colonel John Coffee's regiment of Cavalry. The militia of Tennessee was led by General Andrew Jackson after receiving orders to assist the friendly Creek Indians in their fight against Red Stick Creeks in the Creek War. In early November 1813, Lauderdale participated in General John Coffee's attack on the Red Stick village of Tallushatchee. Coffee's soldiers were split into two columns to surround the village before a surprise attack was launched. General Jackson had ordered the village completely destroyed, and after 180 Red Stick warriors were killed in the battle, the village was burned down. General Coffee's official report to command stated "They made all the resistance that an overpowered soldier could do... The enemy fought with savage fury and met death with all its horrors... No one asked to be spared but fought as long as they could stand or sit."

A few days after the attack on Tallushatchee, Jackson received an urgent request from allied Creeks who were under a siege from Red Sticks at Fort Leslie. Jackson ordered 1,200 infantry and 800 cavalry troops to march to relieve the siege at the village of Talladega. Using a similar tactic in the battle, Coffee ordered his troops to split into two columns in order to surround the enemy. Lauderdale was among the 85 US soldiers wounded in the Battle of Talladega. While his injury was not serious, he was relieved of his service in order to return to his home to recover.

=== The Battle of Villeré's Plantation ===
Although he had still not fully recovered from his injuries, Lauderdale again joined General Coffee's command in southern Louisiana to prepare for the British invasion during the War of 1812. After the British had taken Lake Borgne and prepared to take New Orleans, General Jackson ordered a three pronged attack on their encampment. Lauderdale was in Coffee's regiment near the left prong during the attack on the night of December 23, 1814. Lauderdale was killed in the early action of the battle. His body was originally buried on the battlefield, but his fellow officers and men under his command disinterred his body and reburied it in a Protestant ground in New Orleans.

== Honors ==
Lauderdale County, Alabama, Lauderdale County, Mississippi, and Lauderdale County, Tennessee are all named in his honor. The city of Fort Lauderdale, Florida was named after a series of forts constructed during the Second Seminole War which had been named after James Lauderdale's brother, Major William Lauderdale.
