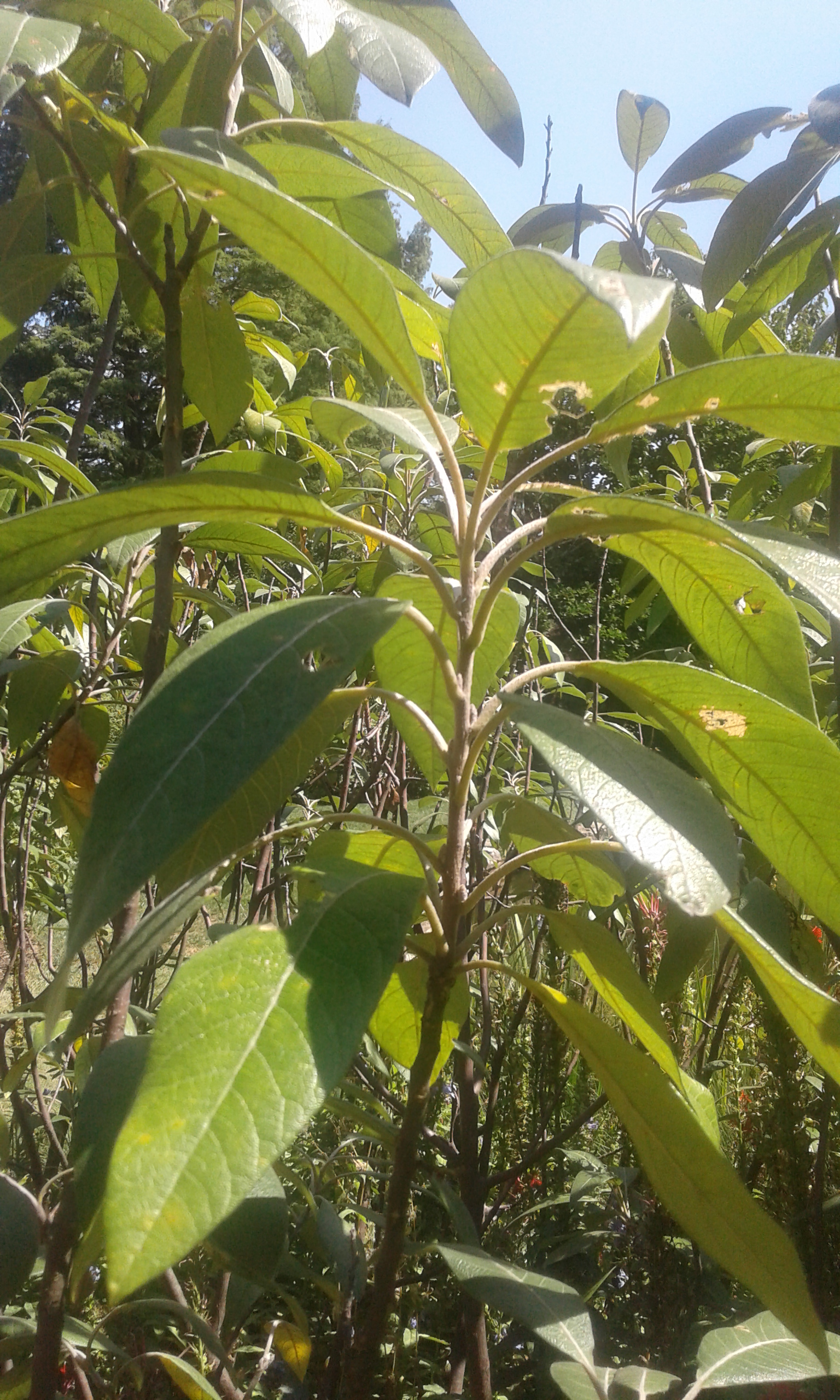

Conservation status
- Near Threatened (IUCN 2.3)

Scientific classification
- Kingdom: Plantae
- Clade: Tracheophytes
- Clade: Angiosperms
- Clade: Eudicots
- Clade: Rosids
- Order: Sapindales
- Family: Simaroubaceae
- Genus: Leitneria; Chapm.
- Species: L. floridana

Binomial name
- Leitneria floridana Chapm.

= Leitneria =

Genus of trees

Leitneria floridana (corkwood), the sole species in the genus Leitneria, is a deciduous dioecious shrub or small tree, found only in the southern United States states of Arkansas, Florida, Georgia, Missouri and Texas.

It grows at damp habitats, mostly in coastal areas and has extremely light wood with a density less than that of cork. It typically reaches 2–4 m tall, occasionally up to 8 m. The trunk can reach 10 cm in diameter. The leaves are alternate, simple lanceolate, 5–20 cm long and 3–6 cm broad.

In the past, it was treated as the only species in the family Leitneriaceae of the order Leitneriales, but genetic research by the Angiosperm Phylogeny Group has recently resulted in its being transferred to the family Simaroubaceae in the Sapindales. It is named after the German natural scientist E. F. Leitner.

== Fossil record ==
A single, strongly compressed endocarp has been collected from the sediments of the Villa San Faustino site in Italy. This isolated specimen demonstrates that †Leitneria venosa persisted in Italy until the Early Pleistocene. Leitneria sp. is also among the species listed in the Early Pliocene San Gimigniano flora. In northern Italy several endocarps of L. venosa have been found at the top of the Cervo River of Late Pliocene age. Leitneria was a rare element in the late Cenozoic floras of Italy
