= William Lauderdale =

American 19th century military officer

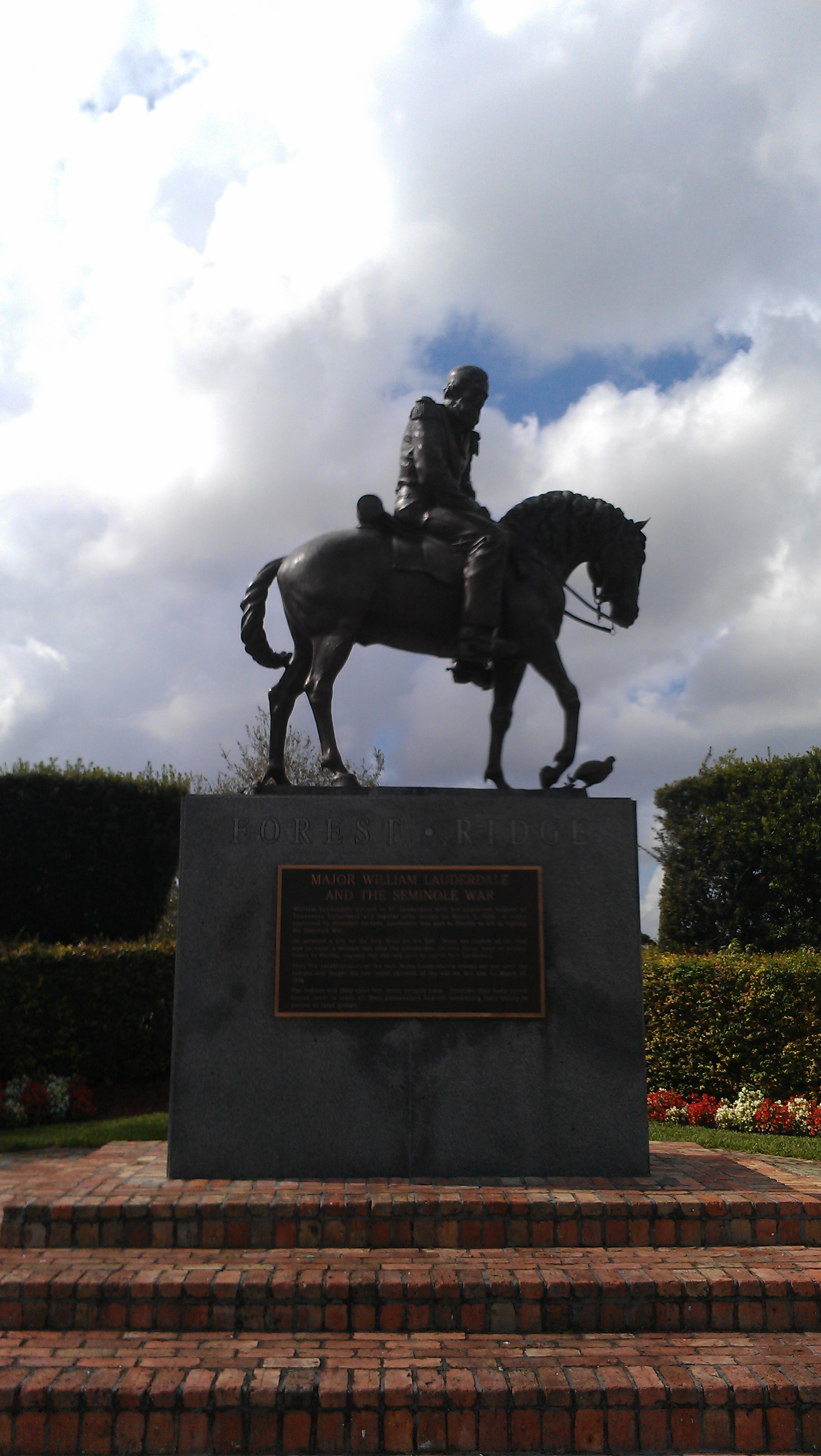
- Statue of Major William Lauderdale in Davie, Florida
- Born: c. 1782; Botetourt County, Virginia, US
- Died: May 11, 1838 (aged 55–56); Baton Rouge, Louisiana, US
- Relatives: James Lauderdale (brother)
- Military career
- Allegiance: United States
- Branch: Tennessee Militia
- Service years: 1812–1838
- Rank: Major
- Conflicts: War of 1812; Creek War; Battle of New Orleans; Second Seminole War; Second Battle of the Loxahatchee; Battle of Pine Island Ridge

William Lauderdale (c. 1782 – May 11, 1838) was an American soldier and planter from Tennessee. He served in both the War of 1812 and the Seminole Wars. The city of Fort Lauderdale, Florida, is named after him.

== Early life ==
William Lauderdale was born around 1782, the third son of Sarah and James Lauderdale in Virginia. James Lauderdale had served in the Continental Army during the Revolutionary War, and as payment for his service, was given a land grant in the frontier of Tennessee. The Lauderdale family was descended from the Scottish Maitland-Lauderdale family, and claimed to be related to Robert the Bruce and William Wallace. In popular family lore, William Lauderdale's grandfather, James Maitland Lauderdale Sr., was the son of a Scottish Earl of Lauderdale, and had immigrated to the American colonies in 1714; however, any relation to the Earl of Lauderdale has never been confirmed by any archival evidence.

Shortly after his birth, Lauderdale and his family moved to Sumner County in Tennessee, where he grew up. He eventually married and had five children. Lauderdale became a planter and lived most of his adult life at his Goose Creek plantation west of Hartsville, Tennessee. Lauderdale lived near the plantation owned by Andrew Jackson, and the two became friends.

== Military service ==
=== War of 1812 ===
Lauderdale first served as a lieutenant under Andrew Jackson when the Tennessee Volunteers were dispatched to New Orleans in 1812. Although the troops were relieved before they encountered any combat, the experience promoted Lauderdale as member of Jackson's inner circle. Lauderdale left his Goose Creek plantation in Hartsville to fight in the Creek War. He eventually became Jackson's chief quartermaster and served under him at the Battle of New Orleans in 1815.

=== Second Seminole War ===
Lauderdale served again as a Major during the Second Seminole War. Andrew Jackson had personally convinced Lauderdale to join the fight against the Seminole Indians. In January 1838, Lauderdale commanded a contingent of the Tennessee Militia at the Second Battle of the Loxahatchee. During this battle, Lauderdale's troops suffered the most casualties out of all the U.S. Military units. After the battle he marched south and established a military outpost on the New River, which would be subsequently named Fort Lauderdale. Lauderdale later led his troops in an unsuccessful attempt to catch Seminole chief Abiaka at the Battle of Pine Island Ridge in March 1838. Shortly afterwards, Lauderdale left Florida to travel back home to Tennessee.

== Death ==
Lauderdale died of a pulmonary embolism on May 11, 1838, near Baton Rouge, Louisiana. during his trip back home. At his funeral, one witness reported, "In the presence of a riderless horse, the band played, colors were presented, and a barrage of artillery and muskets fired a salute."

== Legacy ==
The founding of Fort Lauderdale is memorialized by a historical marker. A statue of the military officer, sculpted and bronzed by a West Palm Beach artist was unveiled in William Lauderdale Park in 1988 to mark the 150th anniversary of the Battle of Pine Island, and a military outpost called "Fort Lauderdale" in Broward County.

Fort Lauderdale, Florida, is named after him.
