= Riverbend Park (Florida) =

Park in Florida, United States of America

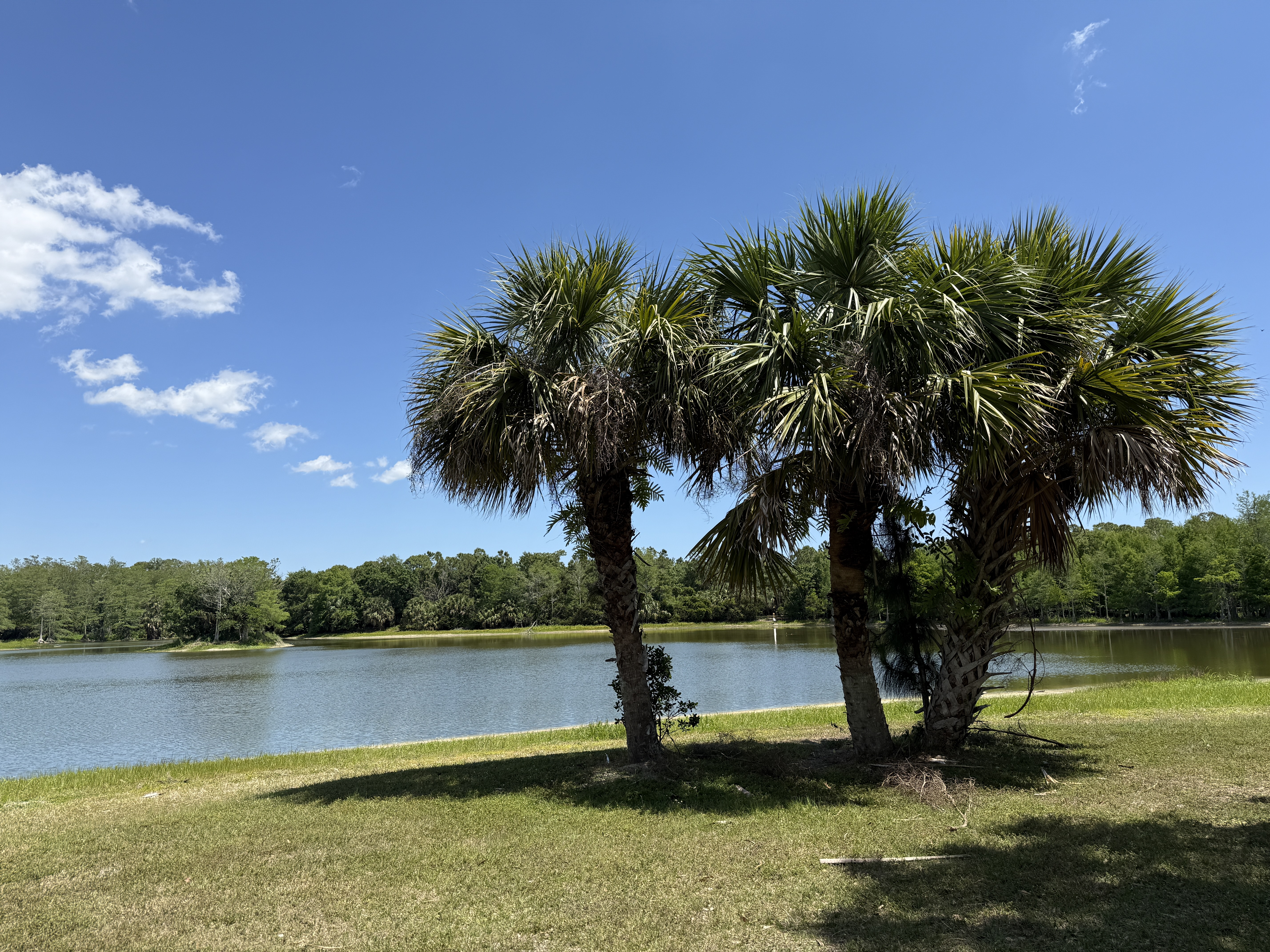
- Cow Pen Lake in Riverbend Park
- Interactive map of Riverbend Park
- Type: Urban park
- Location: Jupiter, Florida, United States
- Coordinates: 26.927°N 80.173°W
- Area: 680 acres (280 ha)
- Operator: Palm Beach County Parks and Recreation Department

Riverbend Park is a 680-acre (280 ha) park in the Jupiter Farms section of Jupiter, in Palm Beach County, Florida. The area includes the Riverbend Regional Park Historic District with Indian middens and a preserved battlefield from the Seminole War at the Loxahatchee River Battlefield Park adjacent to Riverbend. The park includes 10 miles of hiking/biking trails, 7 miles of equestrian trails and 5 miles of canoeing/kayaking trails and includes a section of the Loxahatchee River, a National Wild and Scenic River. A Florida cracker farmstead is displayed, as well as a Seminole-style chickee for picnics. The battlefield area was listed on the National Register of Historic Places in 2024.

== Cultural references ==
Riverbend Park is mentioned in the 2012 novel Torn by Leslie Ann Joy, who grew up in Jupiter Farms.

== Gallery ==
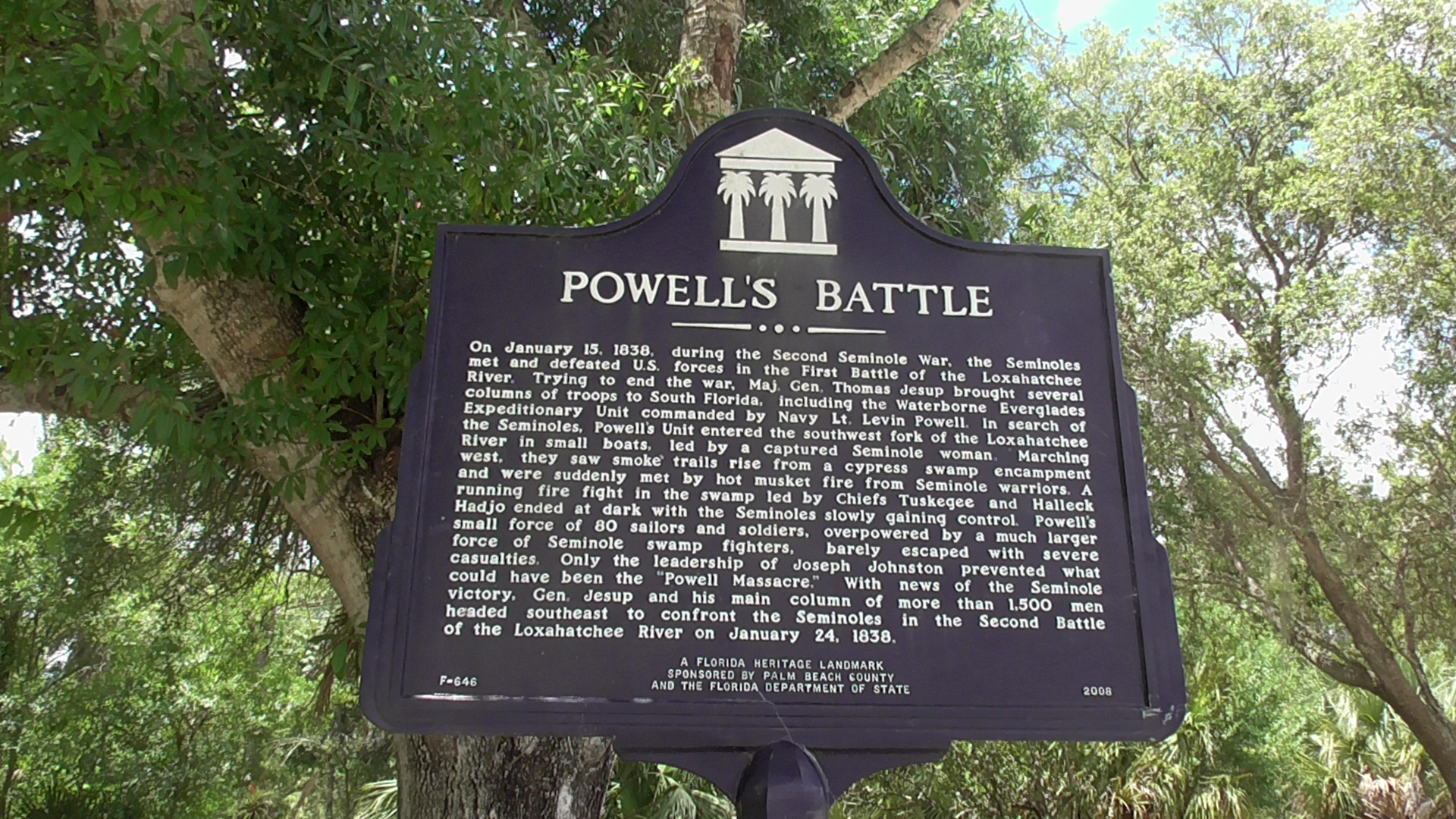
Park Sign displaying Information about the First Battle of the Loxahatchee.

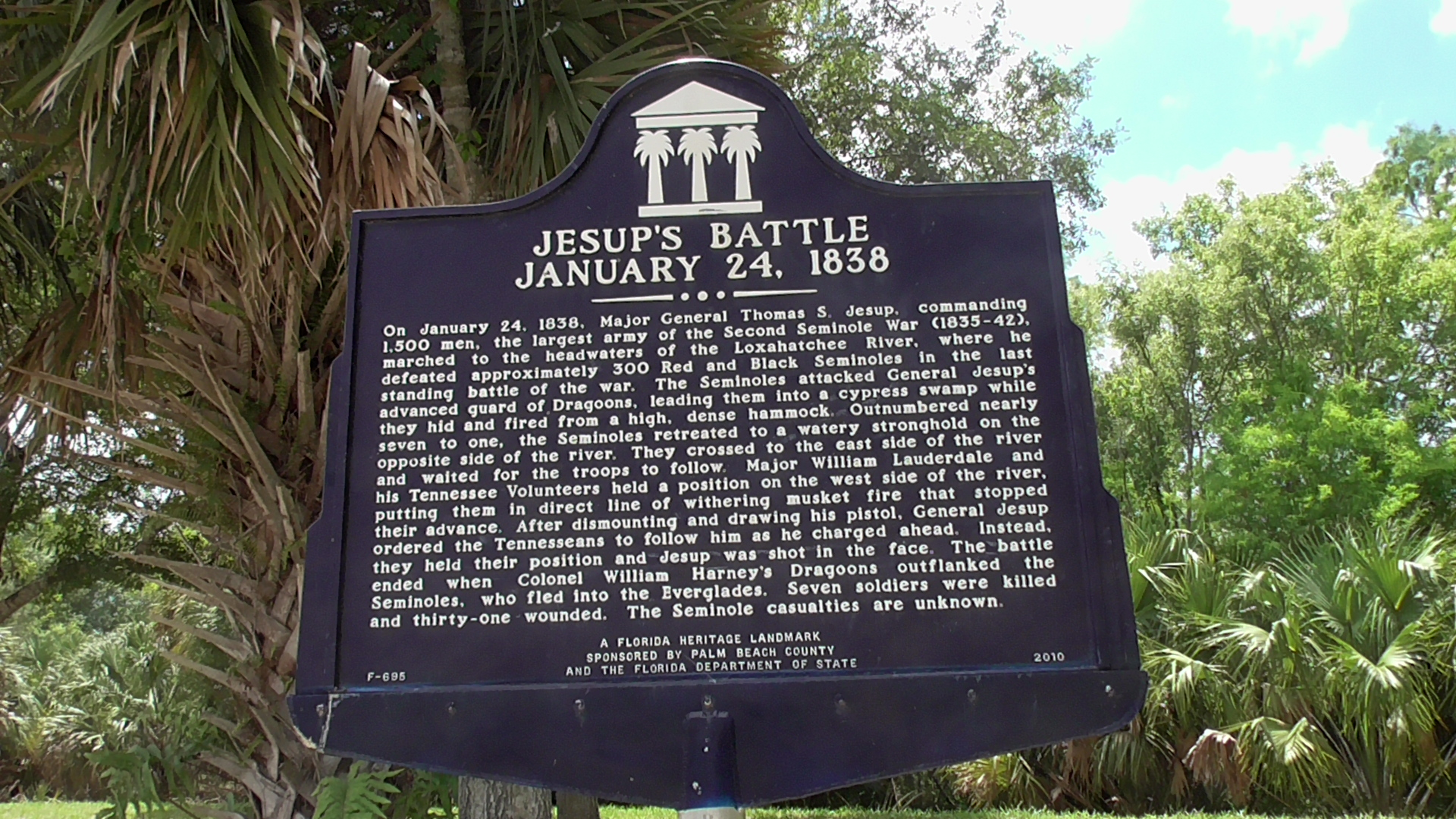
Another Park Sign, this time explaining the Second Battle of the Loxahatchee.

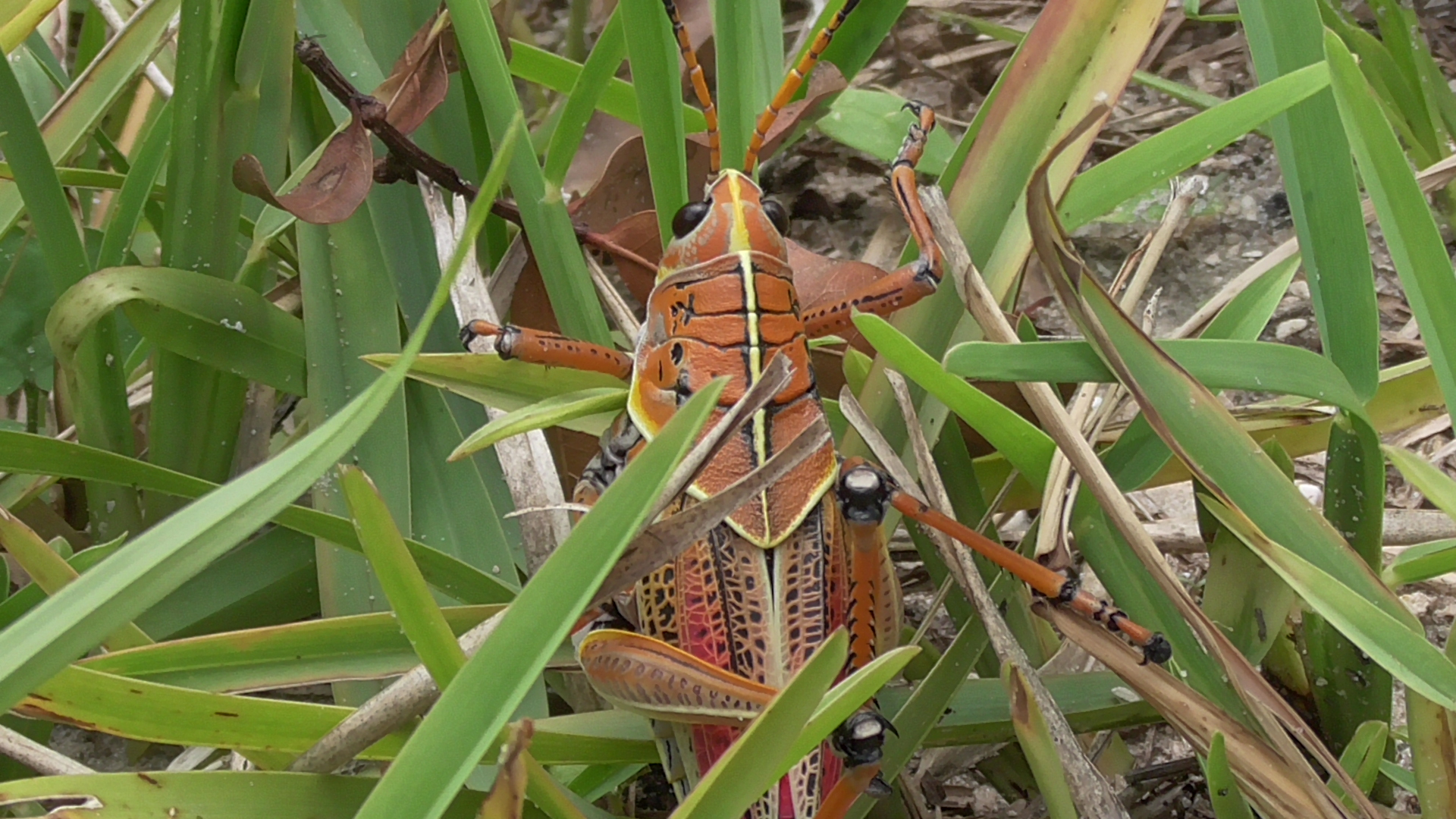
A Florida Eastern Lubber Grasshopper, these insects are very common around the park.

== See also ==
- Jonathan Dickinson State Park
- Battle of the Loxahatchee
