= Battle of Pine Island Ridge =

Battle of Second Seminole War

Coordinates: 26.0960°N 80.2742°W

- Part of Second Seminole War
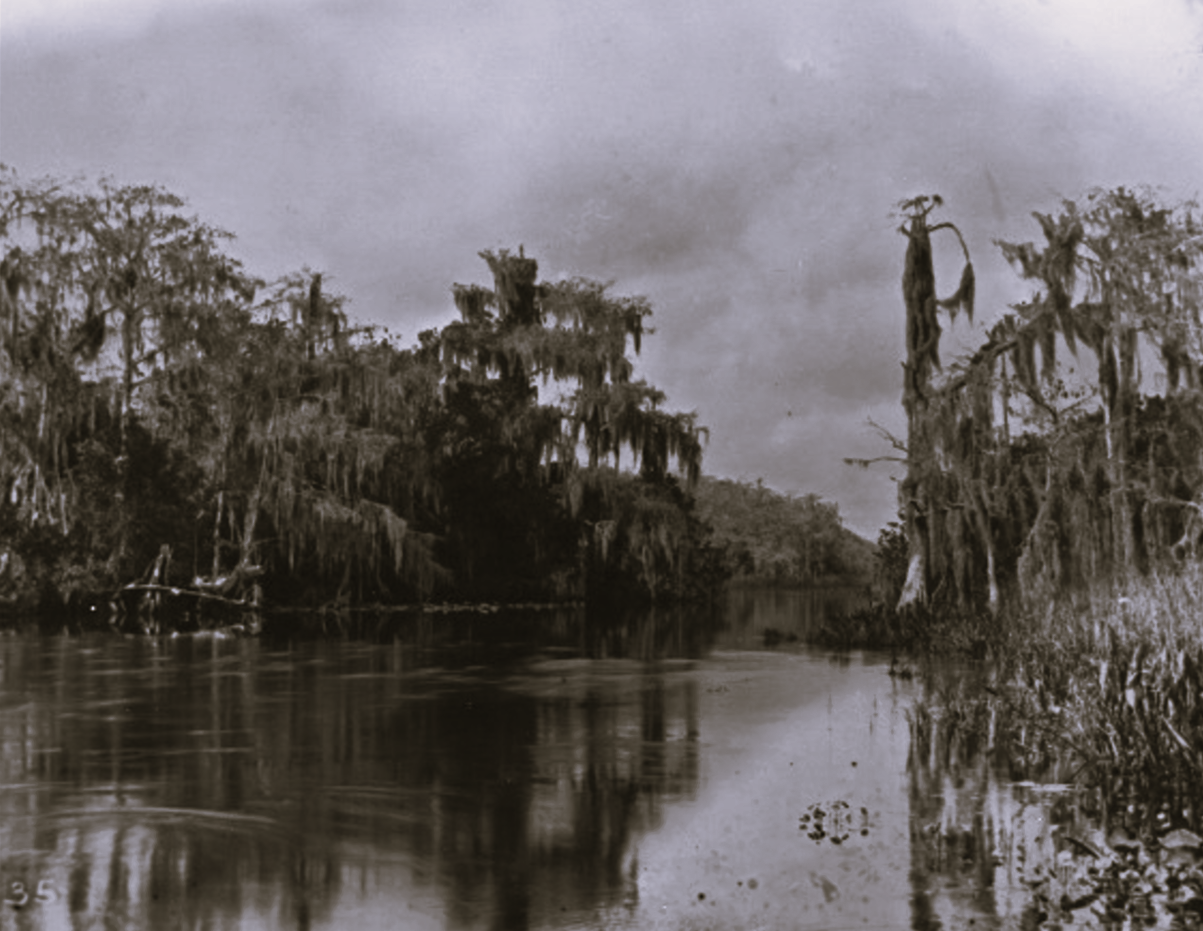
- Photo of the New River area in the 1800s
Date	March 22, 1838
Location	Pine Island Ridge, Broward County, Florida
Result	Seminole victory

Belligerents
United States	Seminole

Commanders and leaders
James Bankhead; William Lauderdale	Abiaka

Strength
500	100

Casualties and losses
1 wounded	None

The Battle of Pine Island Ridge was a battle during the Second Seminole War fought on March 22, 1838, at the site of Pine Island Ridge in South Florida. U.S. troops under the command of Lieutenant Colonel James Bankhead and Major William Lauderdale attacked a large Seminole village on top of Pine Island Ridge, an island in the Everglades at the time. The village was headed by Abiaka, who had recently become the principal chief of the Seminole Indians. As the U.S. troops approached the village, they were fired upon by Seminole warriors perched in the trees on Pine Island Ridge, who held off the U.S. troops long enough for Abiaka and the other villagers to escape. The attack ended in failure for the U.S. troops as they failed to kill or capture any of the Seminoles, who successfully evacuated their village without casualties. The battle was the closest the United States came to catching Abiaka during the Seminole Wars.

== Prelude ==
After repulsing Zachary Taylor's army at the Battle of Lake Okeechobee, the Seminoles under the leadership of Chief Abiaka relocated south to Broward County. Abiaka and his people then built a large village on top of Pine Island Ridge, which is 29 feet above sea-level and the highest point in Broward County. A Seminole traitor named Billy Benefactor told the U.S. Military about the location of the village, and that it contained up to 100 warriors. General Thomas Jesup then ordered an operation to attack Pine Island Ridge. Jesup assigned the operation to Federal soldiers of the 3rd Artillery Regiment under James Bankhead, and volunteers of the Tennessee Militia under William Lauderdale.

== Battle ==
The expedition began at Fort Lauderdale, where the U.S. troops, numbering 500, boarded onto boats and began traversing up the New River. As they traversed further into the Everglades, the soldiers and militiamen had to put their ammunition and equipment in their boats and get out to push the boats through the water. The troops continued to wade through the waist-deep water until they spotted smoke rising from the Seminole village on Pine Island Ridge. James Bankhead then ordered a group of his soldiers to take a white flag and approach the village to see if they would respond peacefully. A Seminole warrior then shot and wounded the soldier holding the flag, hitting his hand. The Seminole warriors, who were positioned in the treetops on the island, then began to yell and fire at the boats of the soldiers.

Bankhead wrote in his report after the battle that at this point: "Believing that all the Indians who had been in this vicinity were on this Island, with their women and children, I anticipated a complete victory, and made with all haste my arrangements to attack them". Instead of ordering his men to directly advance on the village, a tactic which had proven ineffective against the Seminoles in previous battles, Bankhead decided to try flanking the Seminoles on both sides of Pine Island Ridge. Bankhead kept some of his soldiers in the center while ordering his other troops, which included the Tennessee Militiamen under William Lauderdale, to move and flank the left and right sides of the island. The U.S. troops moved to their positions through waist-deep water and sawgrass while being fired at from long-range by the Seminoles on the treetops. As they advanced closer to the island, a four-pounder cannon mounted on one of the boats fired at the Seminoles and forced them to retreat from the treetops. The Seminoles continued to fire at the advancing troops, but they soon realized they were being flanked, and began to withdraw. Abiaka and the other Seminole villagers had already been evacuated, and the warriors then evacuated as well.

The Seminoles escaped westward deeper into the Everglades, while Bankhead and Lauderdale's troops then reached the abandoned village on Pine Island Ridge. The U.S. troops captured supplies from the village, including ammunition, canoes, clothing, and tools, but they failed to kill or capture any of the Seminoles as James Bankhead had initially planned.

== Aftermath ==
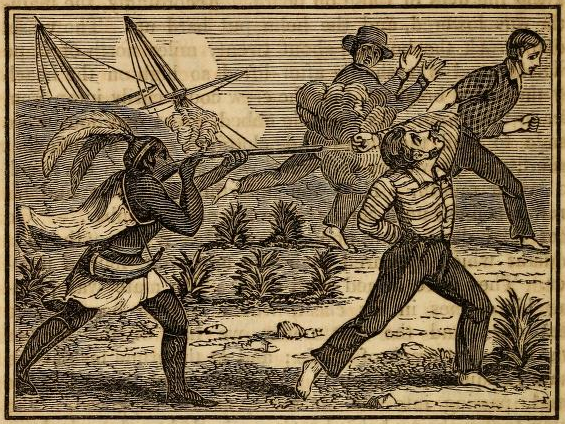
The Death of Captain Thomas, and Escape of VVyer and Cammett. A Seminole warrior attacking the shipwrecked crew of the Brig Alna in 1838. After this battle the Seminole Indians in South Florida began to loot shipwrecks for supplies, and they also killed the White sailors of these ships.

After the Seminoles escaped westward, Bankhead and Lauderdale decided it was futile to pursue them as it was now night time and their troops were exhausted. The U.S. troops returned to Fort Lauderdale on March 24, 1838. William Lauderdale soon left Florida to go back home to his plantation in Tennessee, but he ended up dying of disease in Baton Rouge, Louisiana during his trip back. The U.S. Military erroneously believed that the Seminoles had permanently left the area, and decided to abandon Fort Lauderdale. However, Abiaka and his warriors later returned and burned Fort Lauderdale to the ground. Later in 1838 the Seminoles in this area began to loot shipwrecks for supplies on the south-eastern coast of Florida and kill their stranded crews. After the Seminole Wars ended, the Seminole Indians rebuilt their village on Pine Island Ridge, which they continued to inhabit up until the 20th century.
