= Center Star, Alabama =

Unincorporated community in Alabama, United States

- Unincorporated community
- Location within Alabama Location within the United States
- Coordinates: 34°51′41″N 87°27′20″W
- Country: United States
- State: Alabama
- County: Lauderdale
- Elevation: 669 ft (204 m)
- Time zone: UTC-6 (Central (CST))
  - Summer (DST): UTC-5 (CDT)
- Area codes: 256 & 938
- GNIS feature ID: 155019

Center Star, also known as Centre Star, or Centre (before the American Civil War), is an unincorporated community in Lauderdale County, in the U.S. state of Alabama.

== History ==
Center Star is one of the oldest communities in Lauderdale County. The area was among lands claimed by both the Chickasaw and Cherokee. On May 26, 1861, Edward A. O'Neal organized the "Calhoun Guards" (which became Company I of the 9th Regiment Alabama Infantry) in Center Star. On May 9, 1864, Colonel William A. Johnson's 4th Alabama Cavalry fought with the 7th Illinois Volunteer Infantry Regiment and the 9th Ohio Infantry under the command of Colonel Richard Rowett. The earliest Methodist congregation in Lauderdale County was organized near Center Star in June 1818.

A post office was established at Center Star on April 15, 1850, and was named for its central location on the "star route" (a remote postal route served by a private contractor). The post office was in operation until 1902. It was then reopened for one year in 1914.

== Demographics ==
Historical population
| Census | Pop. | Note | %± |
|---|---|---|---|
| 1880 | 69 | | — |
U.S. Decennial Census

Center Star was listed on the 1880 U.S. Census as an unincorporated community with a population of 69. It was the only time it was listed on the census rolls.

== Notable persons ==
- Mark Narmore, songwriter. Wrote "That's What I Love About Sunday" and "The Moon Over Georgia"
- Spooner Oldham, songwriter and session musician
- Columbus Marion Joiner, lawyer who discovered the East Texas Oil Field
