= St. Florian, Alabama =

- Town
- Seal

- Location of St. Florian in Lauderdale County, Alabama.
- Coordinates: 34°52′22″N 87°37′30″W
- Country: United States
- State: Alabama
- County: Lauderdale

Area
  - Total: 4.39 sq mi (11.36 km^{2})
  - Land: 4.37 sq mi (11.31 km^{2})
  - Water: 0.019 sq mi (0.05 km^{2})
- Elevation: 627 ft (191 m)

Population (2020)
  - Total: 584
  - Density: 133.7/sq mi (51.64/km^{2})
- Time zone: UTC-6 (Central (CST))
  - Summer (DST): UTC-5 (CDT)
- ZIP codes: 65630, 65634 (Florence)
- Area code(s): 256, 938
- FIPS code: 01-67536
- GNIS feature ID: 2407266
- Website: townofstflorianal.com

St. Florian or Saint Florian is a town in Lauderdale County, Alabama, United States. It is part of the Florence - Muscle Shoals Metropolitan Statistical Area known as "The Shoals". As of the 2020 census, St. Florian had a population of 584.

== History ==
The area was first called Wilson Stand, for John and Matthew Wilson, the original owners of the town site. The present community was founded in the 1870s by a colony of Germans who named the town after Saint Florian. A post office was established at St. Florian in 1879, and remained in operation until it was discontinued in 1904. The town incorporated at some point in the 1970s, as cited by the 1980 U.S. Census.

== Geography ==
According to the U.S. Census Bureau, the town has a total area of 3.0 square miles (7.8 km^{2}), all land.

== Demographics ==
Historical population
Census	Pop.	Note	%±
1880	135		—
1970	168		—
1980	305		81.5%
1990	388		27.2%
2000	335		−13.7%
2010	413		23.3%
2020	584		41.4%
U.S. Decennial Census; 2013 Estimate

As of the census of 2000, there were 335 people, 129 households, and 103 families residing in the town. The population density was 112.3 inhabitants per square mile (43.4/km^{2}). There were 140 housing units at an average density of 46.9 per square mile (18.1/km^{2}). The racial makeup of the town was 98.81% White, 0.60% Black or African American and 0.60% Asian.

There were 129 households, out of which 34.1% had children under the age of 18 living with them, 72.9% were married couples living together, 2.3% had a female householder with no husband present, and 19.4% were non-families. 17.1% of all households were made up of individuals, and 8.5% had someone living alone who was 65 years of age or older. The average household size was 2.60 and the average family size was 2.89.

In the town, the population was spread out, with 22.1% under the age of 18, 6.9% from 18 to 24, 31.0% from 25 to 44, 28.4% from 45 to 64, and 11.6% who were 65 years of age or older. The median age was 40 years. For every 100 females, there were 94.8 males. For every 100 females age 18 and over, there were 102.3 males.

The median income for a household in the town was $46,250, and the median income for a family was $48,125. Males had a median income of $36,364 versus $21,250 for females. The per capita income for the town was $17,522. About 9.2% of families and 9.8% of the population were below the poverty line, including 16.5% of those under age 18 and 7.5% of those age 65 or over.
