= Hugh McVay =

American politician

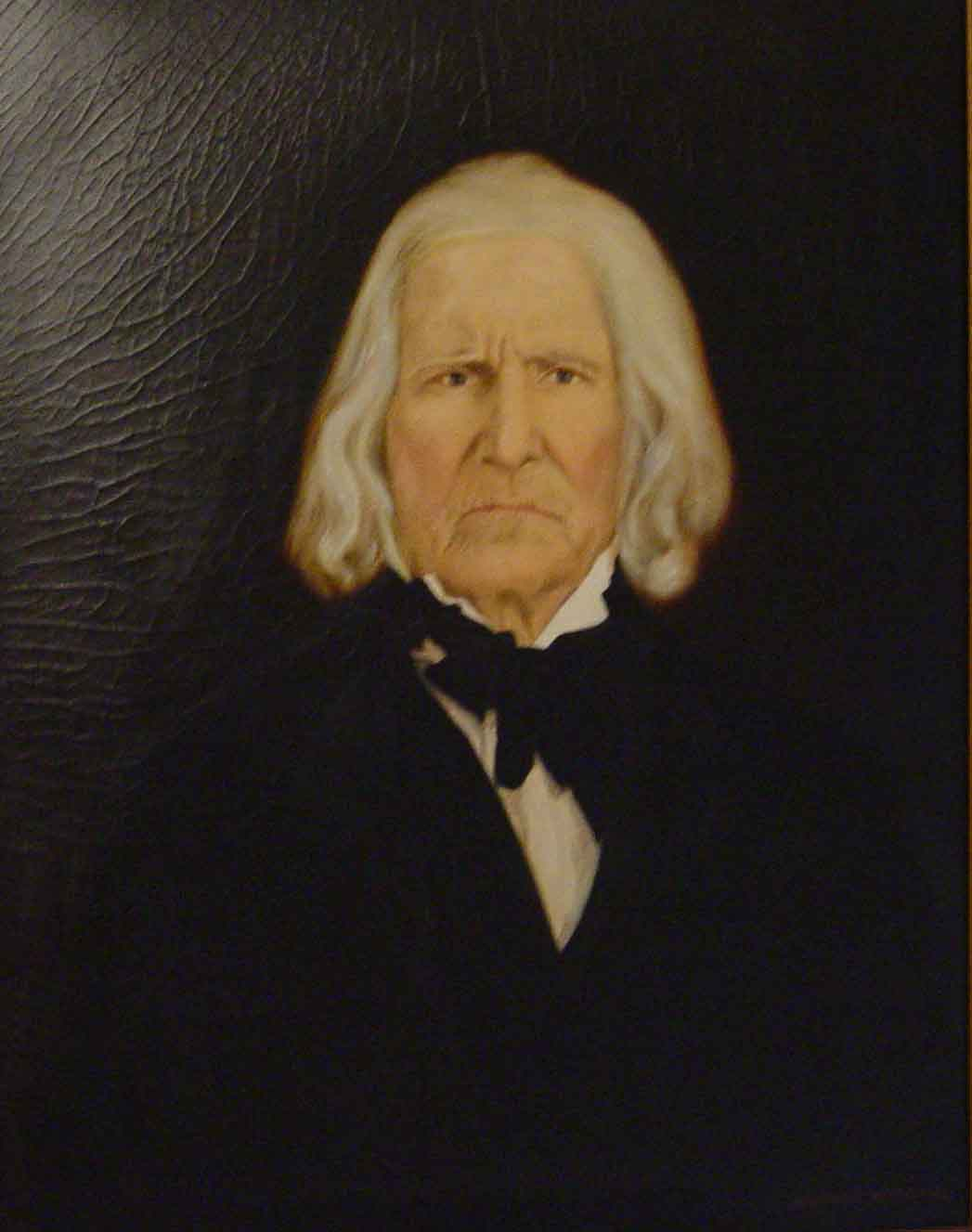

9th Governor of Alabama
- In office July 17, 1837 – November 30, 1837
- Preceded by: Clement Comer Clay
- Succeeded by: Arthur P. Bagby

Member of the Alabama House of Representatives
- In office 1820-1825

Member of the Alabama Senate
- In office 1825-1844

Personal details
- Born: April 29, 1766 South Carolina
- Died: May 9, 1851 (aged 85) Birmingham, Alabama, US
- Resting place: Moore-McVay Cemetery, Florence, Alabama
- Party: Democratic
- Profession: Politician

Hugh McVay (April 29, 1766 – May 9, 1851) was the ninth governor of Alabama from July 17 to November 30, 1837. He was born in South Carolina.

== Early career ==
McVay moved from South Carolina to the Territory of Mississippi and represented Madison County in the Alabama Legislature from 1811 to 1818. He then moved to Lauderdale County and represented Lauderdale County in the 1819 Alabama Constitutional Convention. McVay lived in the community of Mars Hill, Alabama, and is buried there.

== Alabama Congress ==
McVay was in the Alabama House of Representatives from 1820 to 1825. He then served in the Alabama State Senate from 1825 to 1844.

== Governor of Alabama ==
McVay was elected Speaker of the Senate in 1836 and became acting governor of Alabama in 1837 when Governor Clement C. Clay was appointed to the United States Senate. McVay served as governor from July 17, 1837, to November 30, 1837, when Governor Arthur P. Bagby took office.

Political offices
Preceded by Clement C. Clay	Governor of Alabama; 1837	Succeeded by Arthur P. Bagby
