= Stewartville, Lauderdale County, Alabama =

Unincorporated community in Alabama, United States

Stewartville, Alabama
- Unincorporated community
- Location within Alabama Location within the United States
- Coordinates: 34°56′53″N 87°52′08″W
- Country: United States
- State: Alabama
- County: Lauderdale
- Elevation: 712 ft (217 m)
- Time zone: UTC-6 (Central (CST))
  - Summer (DST): UTC-5 (CDT)
- Area codes: 256 & 938
- GNIS feature ID: 142208

Stewartville is an unincorporated community in Lauderdale County, Alabama, United States. It is located on Alabama State Route 20, 15 miles (24 km) northwest of Florence.
