= Levin M. Powell =

American military officer (1798–1885)

Levin Mynn Powell
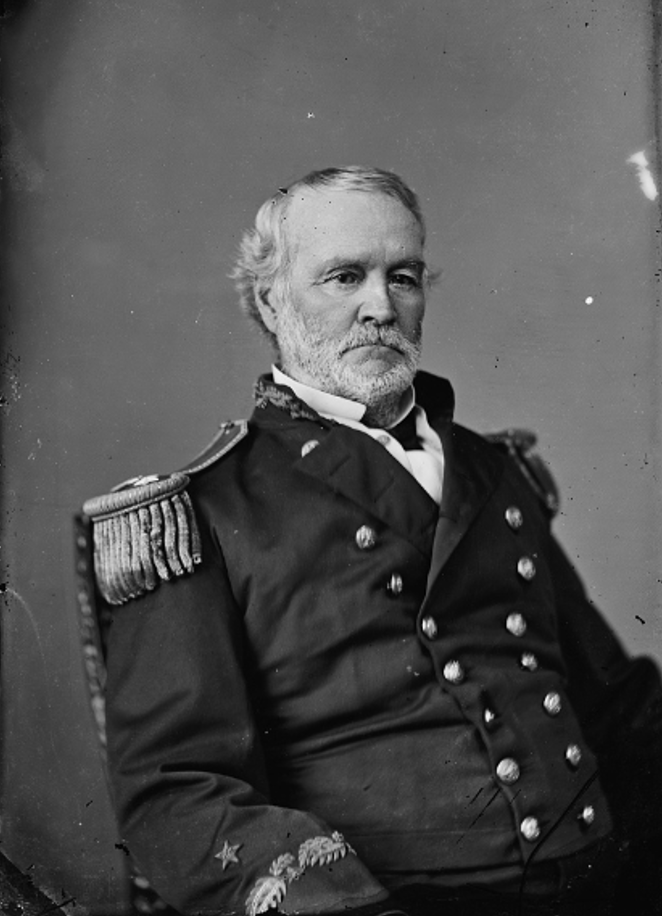
- Admiral Powell in 1870
- Born: April 8, 1798; Winchester, Virginia, U.S.
- Died: January 15, 1885 (aged 86); Washington, D.C., U.S.
- Burial place: Oak Hill Cemetery
- Military career
- Allegiance: United States
- Branch: United States Navy (Union Navy)
- Service years: 1813–1872
- Rank: Rear admiral
- Commands: USRC Washington; USS Consort; USS John Adams (1799); USS Potomac
- Conflicts: Second Seminole War; First Battle of the Loxahatchee (WIA); American Civil War; Union blockade

Levin Mynn Powell (April 8, 1798 – January 15, 1885) was a rear admiral of the United States Navy. He was known for his service in the Second Seminole War and developing riverine warfare techniques to fight the Seminole tribe in Florida. He also served with the Union Navy in the American Civil War.

== Early life ==
Levin Mynn Powell was born on April 8, 1798, in Winchester, Virginia, to Sidney (née Thruston) and Alfred Harrison Powell.

== Career ==
Powell joined the United States Navy in 1813. On March 1, 1817, Powell was appointed midshipman. He served in the Mediterranean Sea for three years and in the China Seas for three years. He was promoted to lieutenant on April 28, 1826, following service in the Gulf of Mexico and West Indies fighting pirates. He then served again in the Mediterranean aboard the schooner USS Porpoise. He was transferred to another ship in the squadron, the frigate USS Java, in 1830. He then served in the sloop USS Natchez in Charleston, South Carolina, and then moved back to Europe and was stationed off the French coast. From 1836 to 1838, Powell commanded forces and the USRC Washington during the Second Seminole War and fought with the Seminole in Florida. The riverine warfare that Powell developed would be used to improve amphibious techniques against the Seminoles. He was engaged at the First Battle of the Loxahatchee on January 15, 1838, sometimes called "Powell's Battle". During the battle, Powell and his troops were ambushed and defeated by Seminole warriors. He was wounded in the battle.

From 1840 to 1841, Powell was commanding officer of the brig USS Consort and surveyed the coast from the Apalachicola River to the Mississippi River. In June 1843, Powell was commissioned as commander. From 1848 to 1849, he was Assistant Inspector of Ordnance in Washington, D.C. In July 1849, Powell commanded the sloop-of-war USS John Adams. He was with the John Adams for one and a half years; sailing to Brazil and the African coast. Powell then served as an executive officer at the Washington Navy Yard for three years. Powell commanded the USS Potomac and was promoted to captain in September 1855. From 1856 to 1860, Powell was inspector of contract steamers. During the American Civil War, Powell commanded the USS Potomac of the Union Navy, from August 20, 1861, to June 29, 1862. The Potomac was on blockade duty in the Gulf of Mexico. He was promoted to commodore in July 1866 and promoted again to rear admiral on the retired list in 1869. He did not retire until 1872.

Powell served as Inspector of the Third Lighthouse District for four years and was on special service at the department for six years.

== Personal life ==
Powell was married. Powell died on January 15, 1885, at his house in Washington, D.C. He was buried at Oak Hill Cemetery in Washington, D.C.

== Legacy ==
Powell left an endowment in his will with the Columbian University to establish a naval school to "prepare young men...to enter the Naval Academy at Annapolis". The will was disputed due to the belief that Powell was not of sound mind while signing it. The will was sustained. On March 15, 1885, the Admiral Powell Scholarships were established at Columbian University.

The riverine warfare techniques that Powell developed in the Second Seminole War would be used more than one hundred years later in the Vietnam War by the United States military.
