= Lauderdale County, Alabama =

County in Alabama, United States

- County
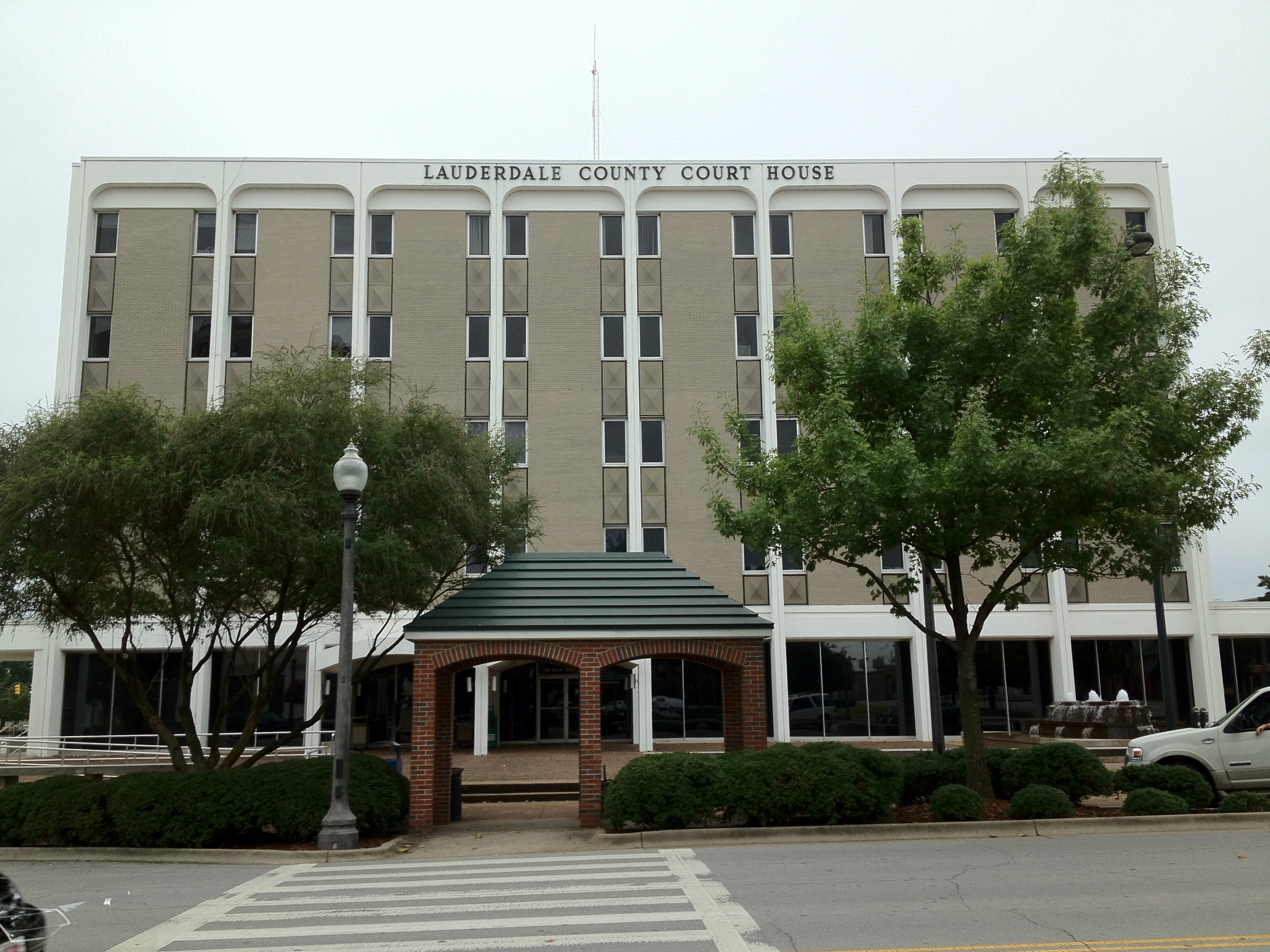
- Lauderdale County Courthouse in Florence

- Location within the U.S. state of Alabama
- Coordinates: 34°53′57″N 87°39′01″W
- Country: United States
- State: Alabama
- Founded: February 6, 1818
- Named for: James Lauderdale
- Seat: Florence
- Largest city: Florence

Area
  - Total: 721 sq mi (1,870 km^{2})
  - Land: 668 sq mi (1,730 km^{2})
  - Water: 53 sq mi (140 km^{2}) 7.4%

Population (2020)
  - Total: 93,564
  - Estimate (2025): 97,135 ▲
  - Density: 140/sq mi (54.1/km^{2})
- Time zone: UTC−6 (Central)
  - Summer (DST): UTC−5 (CDT)
- Congressional districts: 4th, 5th
- Website: LauderdaleCountyAL.Gov
- County Number 41 on Alabama License Plates

Lauderdale County is a county located in the northwestern corner of the U.S. state of Alabama. At the 2020 census the population was 93,564. Its county seat is Florence. Its name is in honor of Colonel James Lauderdale, of Tennessee. Lauderdale is part of the Florence-Muscle Shoals, AL Metropolitan Statistical Area, also known as "The Shoals".

== History ==
Lauderdale County was named in honor of Col. James Lauderdale who was born in Virginia in about 1780. In the early 19th century, Lauderdale, who moved to West Tennessee, became a major in General John Coffee's cavalry of volunteers. Later promoted to lieutenant colonel, he commanded a brigade of mounted riflemen, serving under Andrew Jackson. According to reliable historians, Col. Lauderdale did not die in the Battle of New Orleans, but was wounded in the Battle of Talladega and died on December 23, 1814, 17 days before Jackson's decisive defeat of the British at New Orleans. Several towns and counties in the southern states were named in his honor, though it is said that he never set foot in Lauderdale County.

Lauderdale County was established in 1818, a year before Alabama became a state. Florence, the county seat of Lauderdale County, was also established in 1818. At this time a group of investors, under the name of Cypress Land Company purchased from the government 5,515 acres (22.32 km^{2}) of land consisting of the original town site. Other towns in Lauderdale County competing for early settlers because of their proximity to the river were Savage's Spring, 9 miles (14 km) below Florence and Waterloo, some 20 miles (32 km) downriver.

Among the older settlements in the county is Center Star, located between Killen and Rogersville. This area was once claimed by both the Chickasaws and Cherokees, necessitating a cession of territory from each tribe before the settlement could be established. At one time, the remains of an old Indian village could be seen southwest of Center Star. Other old settlements included Middleton and Elgin, the latter known first as Ingram's Elgin Cross Roads.

Rogersville, lying some 23 miles (37 km) to the east of Florence, was named for John Rogers, an Indian trader, whose sons were fast friends of the great Sam Houston. The late Will Rogers is said to have been a descendant of this same family. An early ferry that operated for many years was Lamb's Ferry near Rogersville.

Lexington, Springfield, and Anderson lie to the north of the Lee Highway, the town of Lexington being a part of the territory once claimed by the Cherokee. Many of the settlers of that area came from Tennessee and the Carolinas. The first post office of record at Lexington was on the Loretto Road, north of town, in 1880. Mail at that time was brought in from Loretto, Tennessee, by horseback and carts.

The town of St. Florian was established in 1872 on the Jackson Highway and named by its Catholic founders (of German descent) for their patron saint.

Four Alabama governors were from the county - Hugh McVay, Robert M. Patton, Edward A. O'Neal and Emmett O'Neal.

== Geography ==
According to the United States Census Bureau, the county has a total area of 721 square miles (1,870 km^{2}), of which 668 square miles (1,730 km^{2}) is land and 53 square miles (140 km^{2}) (7.4%) is water. The county's entire southern and western boundaries are dictated by the Tennessee River, essentially forming a wedge between the river and the state of Tennessee that even extends past the remainder of the border between Alabama and Mississippi.

=== National protected areas ===
- Key Cave National Wildlife Refuge
- Natchez Trace Parkway (part)

=== Rivers ===
- Tennessee River
- Elk River

=== Adjacent counties ===
- Wayne County, Tennessee - north
- Lawrence County, Tennessee - north
- Giles County, Tennessee - northeast
- Limestone County - east
- Lawrence County - southeast
- Colbert County - south
- Tishomingo County, Mississippi - west
- Hardin County, Tennessee - northwest

== Demographics ==
Historical population
Census	Pop.	Note	%±
1820	4,963		—
1830	11,781		137.4%
1840	14,485		23.0%
1850	17,172		18.6%
1860	17,420		1.4%
1870	15,091		−13.4%
1880	21,035		39.4%
1890	23,739		12.9%
1900	26,559		11.9%
1910	30,936		16.5%
1920	39,556		27.9%
1930	41,130		4.0%
1940	46,230		12.4%
1950	54,179		17.2%
1960	61,622		13.7%
1970	68,111		10.5%
1980	80,546		18.3%
1990	79,661		−1.1%
2000	87,966		10.4%
2010	92,709		5.4%
2020	93,564		0.9%
2025 (est.)	97,135	▲	3.8%
U.S. Decennial Census; 1790–1960 1900–1990; 1990–2000 2010–2020

=== Racial and ethnic composition ===
Lauderdale County, Alabama – Racial and ethnic composition Note: the US Census treats Hispanic/Latino as an ethnic category. This table excludes Latinos from the racial categories and assigns them to a separate category. Hispanics/Latinos may be of any race.
Race / Ethnicity (NH = Non-Hispanic)	Pop 1980	Pop 1990	Pop 2000	Pop 2010	Pop 2020	% 1980	% 1990	% 2000	% 2010	% 2020
White alone (NH)	71,984	71,310	77,240	79,228	76,491	89.37%	89.52%	87.81%	85.46%	81.75%
Black or African American alone (NH)	7,756	7,677	8,624	9,190	9,164	9.63%	9.64%	9.80%	9.91%	9.79%
Native American or Alaska Native alone (NH)	100	163	219	323	295	0.12%	0.20%	0.25%	0.35%	0.32%
Asian alone (NH)	150	193	305	675	748	0.19%	0.24%	0.35%	0.73%	0.80%
Native Hawaiian or Pacific Islander alone (NH)	x	x	13	23	31	x	x	0.01%	0.02%	0.03%
Other race alone (NH)	36	5	47	40	204	0.04%	0.01%	0.05%	0.04%	0.22%
Mixed race or Multiracial (NH)	x	x	624	1,148	3,553	x	x	0.71%	1.24%	3.80%
Hispanic or Latino (any race)	520	313	894	2,082	3,078	0.65%	0.39%	1.02%	2.25%	3.29%
Total	80,546	79,661	87,966	92,709	93,564	100.00%	100.00%	100.00%	100.00%	100.00%

=== 2020 census ===
As of the 2020 census, the county had a population of 93,564. The median age was 41.2 years. 19.9% of residents were under the age of 18 and 20.3% of residents were 65 years of age or older. For every 100 females there were 92.3 males, and for every 100 females age 18 and over there were 89.1 males age 18 and over.

The racial makeup of the county was 82.4% White, 9.9% Black or African American, 0.4% American Indian and Alaska Native, 0.8% Asian, 0.0% Native Hawaiian and Pacific Islander, 1.7% from some other race, and 4.8% from two or more races. Hispanic or Latino residents of any race comprised 3.3% of the population.

47.8% of residents lived in urban areas, while 52.2% lived in rural areas.

There were 39,544 households in the county, of which 26.3% had children under the age of 18 living with them and 30.2% had a female householder with no spouse or partner present. About 32.1% of all households were made up of individuals and 13.9% had someone living alone who was 65 years of age or older.

There were 44,585 housing units, of which 11.3% were vacant. Among occupied housing units, 66.7% were owner-occupied and 33.3% were renter-occupied. The homeowner vacancy rate was 1.7% and the rental vacancy rate was 8.0%.

=== 2010 ===
According to the 2010 United States census, resident were:

- 86.4% White
- 10.0% Black
- 0.4% Native American
- 0.7% Asian
- 0.0% Native Hawaiian or Pacific Islander
- 1.4% Two or more races
- 2.2% Hispanic or Latino (of any race)

=== 2000 ===
As of the census of 2000, there were 87,966 people, 36,088 households and 25,153 families residing in the county. The population density was 131 people per square mile (51 people/km^{2}). There were 40,424 housing units at an average density of 60 units per square mile (23 units/km^{2}). The racial make-up was 84.38% White or European American, 13.85% Black or African American, 0.25% Native American, 0.35% Asian, 0.02% Pacific Islander, 0.36% from other races and 0.79% from two or more races. 1.02% of the population were Hispanic or Latino of any race.

In 2005, 87.8% of the county population was non-Hispanic whites. African Americans were 11.7% of the population and Latinos 1.2% of the population.

According to the 2000 census, the largest ancestry groups in Lauderdale County were English 41.9%, African 13.85%, Scots-Irish 9.66%, Scottish 4.11%, Irish 3.19% and Welsh 2.5%

In 2000, there were 36,088 households, of which 30.40% had children under the age of 18 living with them, 55.80% were married couples living together, 10.80% had a female householder with no husband present, and 30.30% were non-families. 26.40% of all households were made up of individuals, and 11.00% had someone living alone who was 65 years of age or older. The average household size was 2.39 and the average family size was 2.89.

23.00% of the population were under the age of 18, 10.10% from 18 to 24, 27.90% from 25 to 44, 23.90% from 45 to 64 and 15.10% were 65 years of age or older. The median age was 38 years. For every 100 females, there were 91.70 males. For every 100 females age 18 and over, there were 88.20 males.

The median household income was $33,354 and the median family income was $41,438. Males had a median income of $33,943 and females $20,804. The per capita income was $18,626. About 10.50% of families and 14.40% of the population were below the poverty line, including 18.50% of those under age 18 and 11.30% of those age 65 or over.

== Transportation ==
=== Major highways ===
- U.S. Highway 43 / State Route 13 (unsigned)
- U.S. Highway 72 / State Route 2 (unsigned)
- State Route 17
- State Route 20
- State Route 64
- State Route 99
- State Route 101
- State Route 133
- State Route 157
- State Route 207
- Natchez Trace Parkway

=== Rail ===
- Tennessee Southern Railroad

== Points of interest ==
Lauderdale County is the location of the W. C. Handy Home and Museum and the Rosenbaum House.

=== Recreation ===
- Joe Wheeler State Park
- North Alabama Birding Trail - collection of birdwatching areas.
- Natchez Trace Parkway - 444 miles (715 km) of linear park and roadway that travel from Nashville, Tennessee to Natchez, Mississippi. It has road pull-offs with educational kiosks with information about the land, history, and native species.
- Shoal Creek Preserve Tract - a 298 acres (121 ha) tract for the preservation of native plants and animals. The land also has recreational opportunities, including bird watching, a horse trail loop that is 2.1 miles (3.4 km) long, 4.2 miles (6.8 km) of hiking trails and limited hunting. This tract is located north of St. Florian, Alabama.

== Politics ==
Lauderdale County is reliably Republican at the presidential level. The last Democrat to win the county in a presidential election is Bill Clinton, who won it by a plurality in 1992.

United States presidential election results for Lauderdale County, Alabama
Year	Republican		Democratic		Third party(ies)	
Year	No.	%	No.	%	No.	%
1824	142	20.94%	530	78.17%	6	0.88%
1828	108	10.15%	956	89.85%	0	0.00%
1832	0	0.00%	729	100.00%	0	0.00%
1836	415	31.16%	917	68.84%	0	0.00%
1840	645	39.52%	987	60.48%	0	0.00%
1844	474	34.03%	919	65.97%	0	0.00%
1848	695	47.38%	772	52.62%	0	0.00%
1852	441	35.45%	803	64.55%	0	0.00%
1856	0	0.00%	1,141	67.28%	555	32.72%
1860	0	0.00%	790	40.72%	1,150	59.28%
1868	378	20.84%	1,436	79.16%	0	0.00%
1872	936	41.14%	1,339	58.86%	0	0.00%
1876	1,044	37.77%	1,720	62.23%	0	0.00%
1880	1,228	40.14%	1,743	56.98%	88	2.88%
1884	629	26.40%	1,698	71.25%	56	2.35%
1888	1,120	40.61%	1,637	59.35%	1	0.04%
1892	0	0.00%	2,352	64.53%	1,293	35.47%
1896	1,024	30.26%	2,300	67.97%	60	1.77%
1900	1,458	50.85%	1,380	48.13%	29	1.01%
1904	316	19.68%	1,269	79.02%	21	1.31%
1908	427	26.08%	1,177	71.90%	33	2.02%
1912	263	13.03%	1,386	68.68%	369	18.29%
1916	369	17.51%	1,678	79.64%	60	2.85%
1920	1,164	30.08%	2,644	68.32%	62	1.60%
1924	823	25.90%	2,266	71.30%	89	2.80%
1928	1,410	33.78%	2,763	66.20%	1	0.02%
1932	432	11.40%	3,336	88.04%	21	0.55%
1936	390	7.61%	4,685	91.41%	50	0.98%
1940	507	9.04%	5,065	90.35%	34	0.61%
1944	590	12.80%	4,001	86.77%	20	0.43%
1948	546	14.29%	0	0.00%	3,276	85.71%
1952	1,910	21.16%	7,097	78.62%	20	0.22%
1956	2,458	21.02%	9,150	78.26%	84	0.72%
1960	3,570	29.22%	8,565	70.10%	84	0.69%
1964	5,978	47.55%	0	0.00%	6,593	52.45%
1968	2,952	15.63%	2,166	11.47%	13,765	72.90%
1972	14,410	71.66%	5,112	25.42%	586	2.91%
1976	7,226	31.17%	15,549	67.06%	410	1.77%
1980	10,467	38.42%	15,379	56.45%	1,397	5.13%
1984	15,354	53.57%	12,907	45.04%	398	1.39%
1988	12,942	49.43%	12,862	49.13%	376	1.44%
1992	13,728	40.67%	15,936	47.21%	4,092	12.12%
1996	14,058	46.19%	13,619	44.75%	2,759	9.06%
2000	17,478	54.39%	13,875	43.17%	784	2.44%
2004	22,161	59.72%	14,628	39.42%	318	0.86%
2008	24,068	63.16%	13,329	34.98%	707	1.86%
2012	23,911	64.57%	12,511	33.78%	610	1.65%
2016	27,899	70.59%	9,952	25.18%	1,674	4.24%
2020	31,721	71.54%	11,915	26.87%	703	1.59%
2024	32,708	74.95%	10,326	23.66%	603	1.38%

United States Senate election results for Lauderdale County, Alabama2
Year	Republican		Democratic		Third party(ies)	
Year	No.	%	No.	%	No.	%
2020	30,071	68.29%	13,874	31.51%	88	0.20%

United States Senate election results for Lauderdale County, Alabama3
Year	Republican		Democratic		Third party(ies)	
Year	No.	%	No.	%	No.	%
2022	19,893	76.84%	5,453	21.06%	542	2.09%

Alabama Gubernatorial election results for Lauderdale County
Year	Republican		Democratic		Third party(ies)	
Year	No.	%	No.	%	No.	%
2022	20,235	78.12%	4,761	18.38%	905	3.49%

== Education ==
Lauderdale County School District serves areas outside of Florence, while Florence City Schools serve people in Florence itself.

== Communities ==
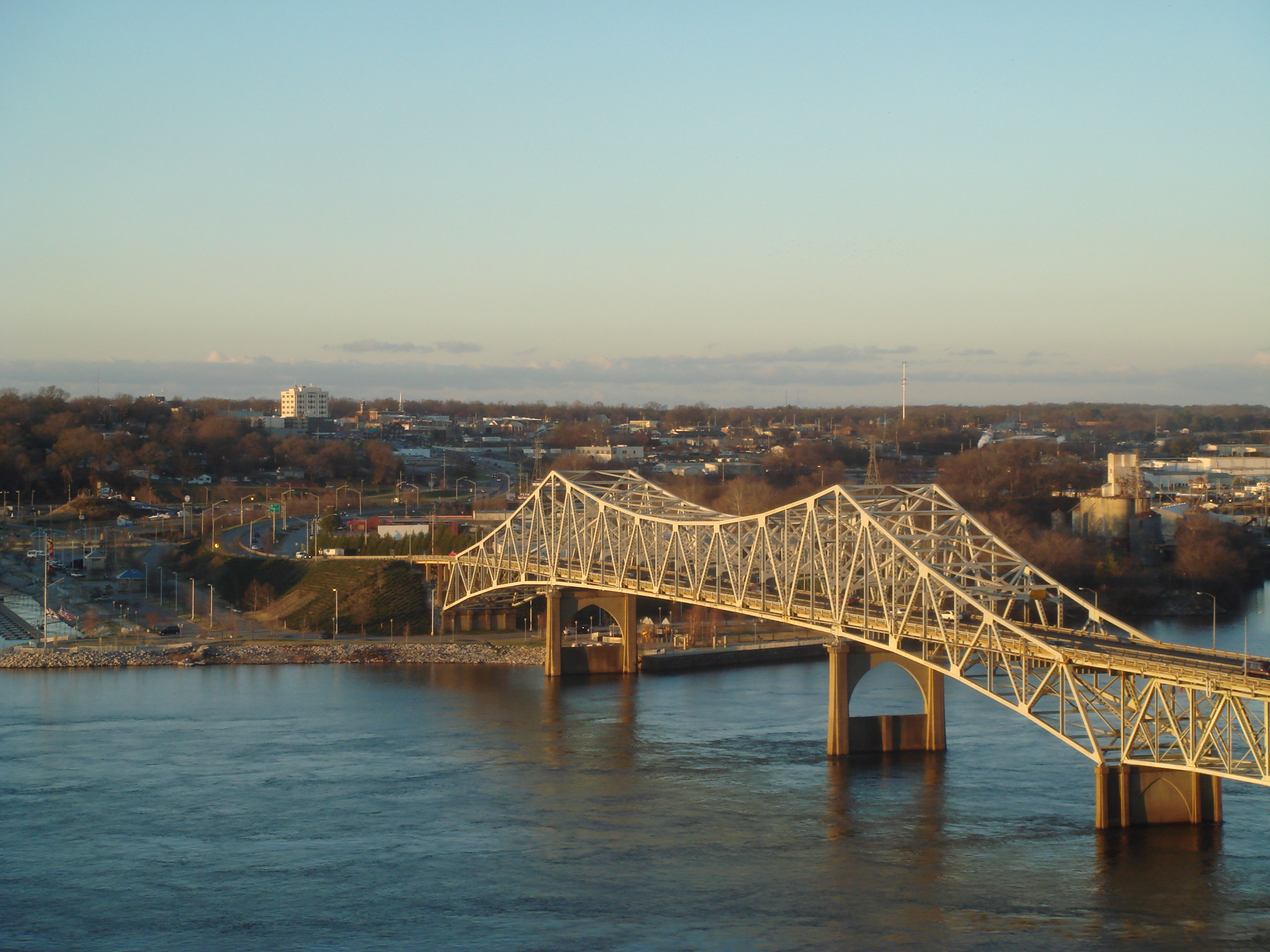
Florence

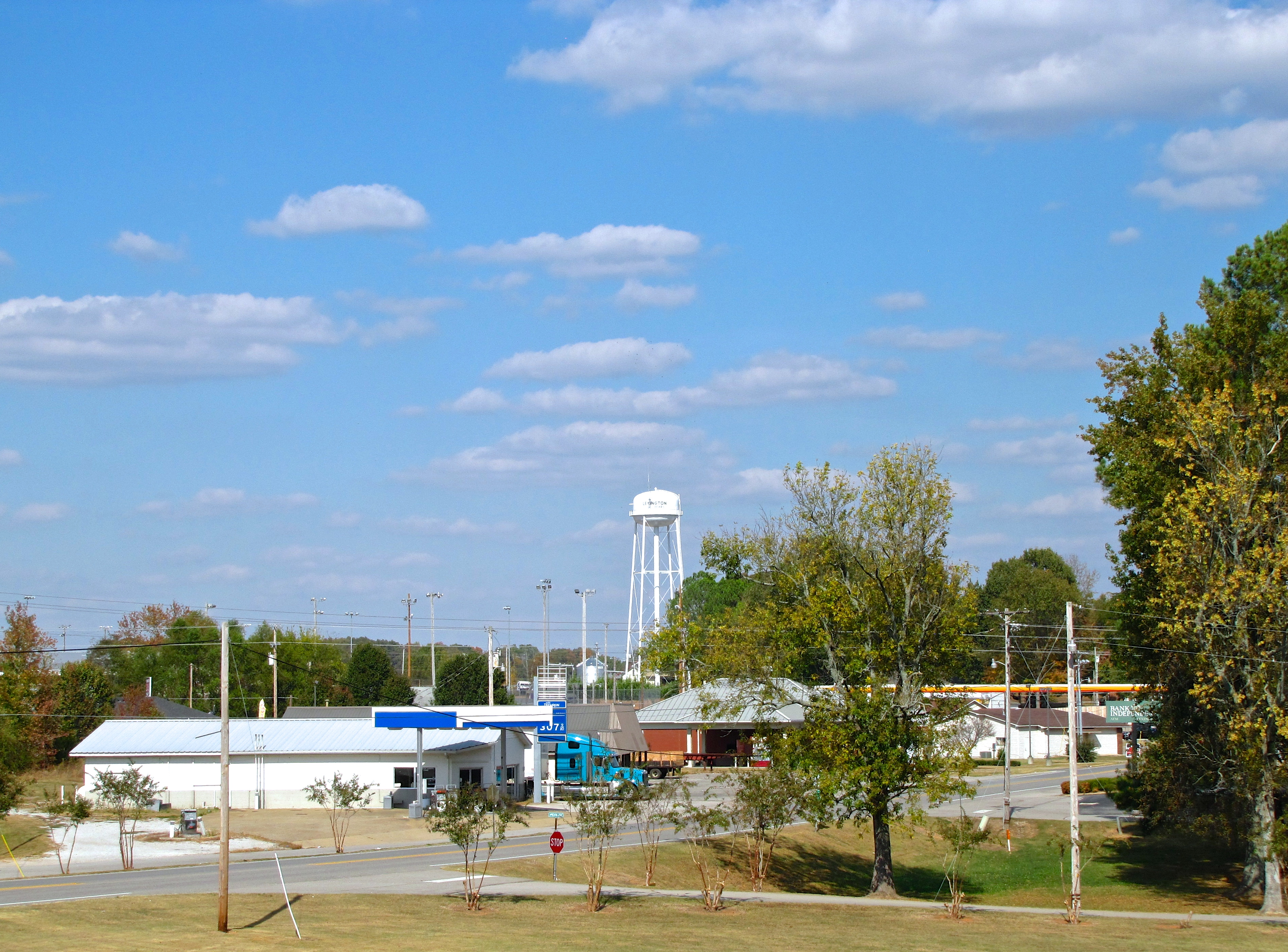
Lexington

=== City ===
- Florence (county seat)

=== Towns ===
- Anderson
- Killen
- Lexington
- Rogersville
- St. Florian
- Waterloo

=== Census-designated place ===
- Underwood-Petersville

=== Unincorporated communities ===
- Bailey Springs
- Center Star
- Cloverdale
- Elgin
- Grassy
- Green Hill
- Mars Hill
- Oakland
- Rhodesville
- Smithsonia
- Stewartville
- Threet
- Wright
- Zip City
- Kingtown

=== Ghost town ===
- Bainbridge

== See also ==
- National Register of Historic Places listings in Lauderdale County, Alabama
- Properties on the Alabama Register of Landmarks and Heritage in Lauderdale County, Alabama
