= Wildcatter =

Term for petroleum industry occupation

A wildcatter is an individual who drills wildcat wells, which are exploration oil wells drilled in areas not known to be oil fields.

The term was used in the early oil industry in western Pennsylvania. Oil wells in unproven territory were called "wild cat" wells from mid-1870, and those who drilled them were called "wild-catters" by 1876. For instance, the Titusville Herald noted in 1880: "The discovery of the fluid in New York State was the signal for a general exodus of wildcatters from all parts of the oil country ..."

== Etymology ==
According to tradition, the origin of the term in the petroleum industry comes from Wildcat Hollow, now in Oil Creek State Park near Titusville, Pennsylvania. Wildcat Hollow was one of the many productive fields in the early oil era. An old story claims that a speculator who was drilling in this narrow valley shot a wildcat, had it stuffed, and set it atop his derrick, and that the mounted cat gave its name to the hollow. The same story claims that because the area was largely untested and somewhat away from Oil Creek Flats, the term "wildcatter" was coined to refer to a person who risked drilling for oil in any unproven area.

Wildcat was American slang for any risky business venture by 1838, long before the rise of the petroleum industry. An example was the wildcat banking of the 1850s. Directors of wildcat banks in the Midwest were known as "wild-catters" before Edwin Drake's discovery of oil in Pennsylvania.

== Notable wildcatters ==
- Glenn McCarthy
- Thomas Baker Slick Sr.
- Mike Benedum
- Joe Trees
- Columbus Marion Joiner

== See also ==
- Hydrocarbon exploration
- William M. Keck
