= James Bankhead =

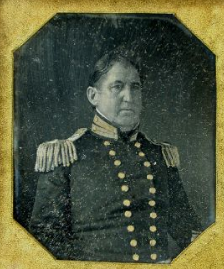
Col. James Bankhead, 2nd U. S. Artillery. c. 1846. by J. Plumbe

James Bankhead (May 24, 1783 – November 11, 1856) was a U.S. Army officer who rose to the rank of brevet brigadier general and served in the War of 1812, Second Seminole War, and Mexican–American War.

== Biography ==
James Bankhead was born on May 24, 1783, in Port Royal, Caroline County, Virginia.

Bankhead joined the U. S. Army in 1808 as a captain in the 5th Infantry Regiment. Bankhead and Winfield Scott entered the army on the same day, and they remained lifelong friends. Before the War of 1812, Bankhead served in various commands and staff assignments. During the war, he was promoted to major. Later he was on the staff of General Wade Hampton and received a brevet promotion to lieutenant colonel.

His duties as an Army officer took him to Charleston, South Carolina, where he met the fourth daughter of John Pyne, Ann Smith Pyne. Bankhead and Ann Pyne were married in her mother's home on Church Street on June 25, 1817.

He attained the rank of lieutenant colonel of the 3rd Artillery Regiment on April 26, 1832.

He saw active service during the Second Seminole War and received a brevet promotion to colonel in 1838 to recognize his bravery.

Col. Bankhead was in command of the garrison of the Buffalo Barracks from October 1838 to August 1841.

Bankhead served in the Mexican–American War at Vera Cruz commanding the 2nd Artillery Regiment and was promoted to brevet Brigadier General for distinguished service in the reduction of Vera Cruz where Bankhead, the senior field officer, acted as chief of artillery in command of the batteries. From January 1848, he commanded the Department of Orizaba, Mexico.

Bankhead was appointed commander of the Department of the East in 1854 and made his headquarters at Fort McHenry, where he served until his death.

Bankhead died on November 11, 1856, in Baltimore. He was buried in Green Mount Cemetery, Baltimore, Maryland.
