= Loxahatchee River =

River in Florida, United States

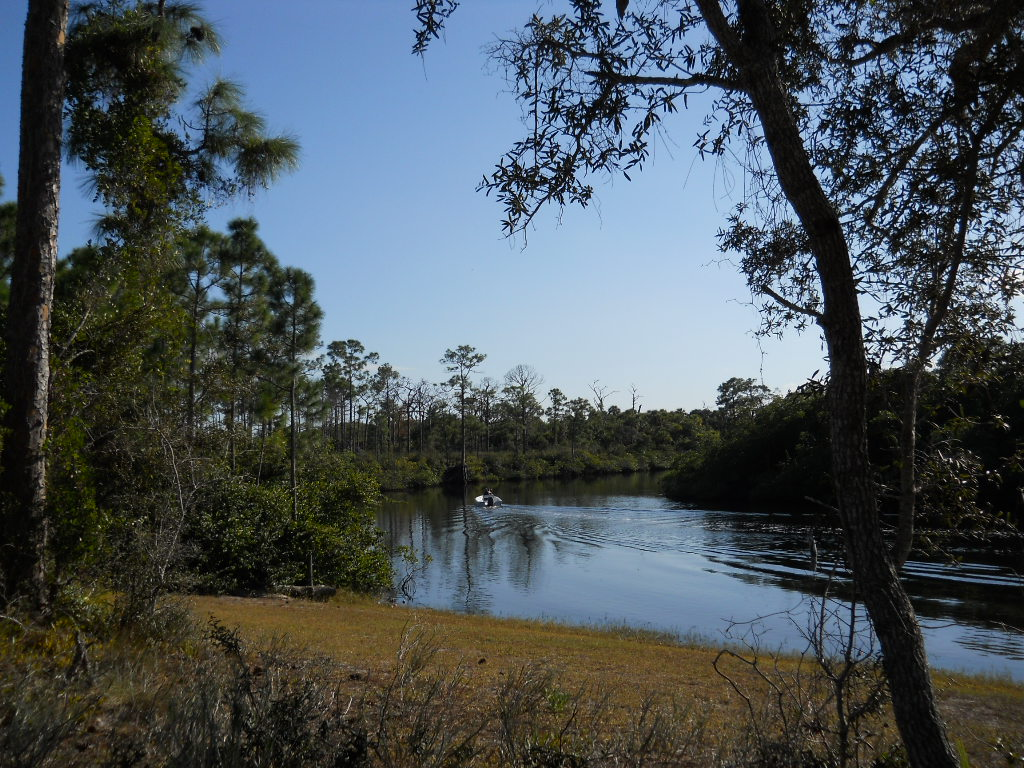
- View of the river inside Jonathan Dickinson State Park

- Location within Florida

Location
- Country: United States

Physical characteristics
- Mouth
  - location: 26°56′57.9″N 80°6′25.8″W
- Length: 12.2 km (7.6 mi)

National Wild and Scenic River
- Type: Wild, Scenic, Recreational
- Designated: May 17, 1985

The Loxahatchee River (Seminole for river of turtles) is a 7.6 mile river near the southeast coast of Florida. It is a National Wild and Scenic River, one of only two in the state, and received its federal designation on May 17, 1985. The source of the Loxahatchee River is in Riverbend Park on the south side of Indiantown Road about 1.5 miles west of I-95 and Florida's Turnpike in Jupiter, Florida. The Loxahatchee River flows out of the Jupiter Inlet and into the Atlantic Ocean. This river was the inspiration for Florida film producer Elam Stoltzfus' 2005 project Our Signature: the Wild and Scenic Loxahatchee River, a film done in conjunction with the Loxahatchee River Preservation Initiative.

Launching points for canoe and kayak trips on the river are accessible at Riverbend Park and at Jonathan Dickinson State Park The 1930s pioneer homestead of Trapper Nelson lies along the river in a section that runs through Jonathan Dickinson State Park.

== See also ==
- List of Florida rivers
