= Downtown Florence Historic District =

Downtown Florence Historic District may refer to:

- Downtown Florence Historic District (Florence, Alabama), listed on the National Register of Historic Places (NRHP)
- Downtown Florence Historic District (Florence, Colorado), NRHP-listed

== See also ==
- Florence Townsite Historic District, Florence, Arizona, NRHP-listed in Pinal County
