= Southgate Mall (Muscle Shoals) =

Shopping mall in Muscle Shoals, Alabama

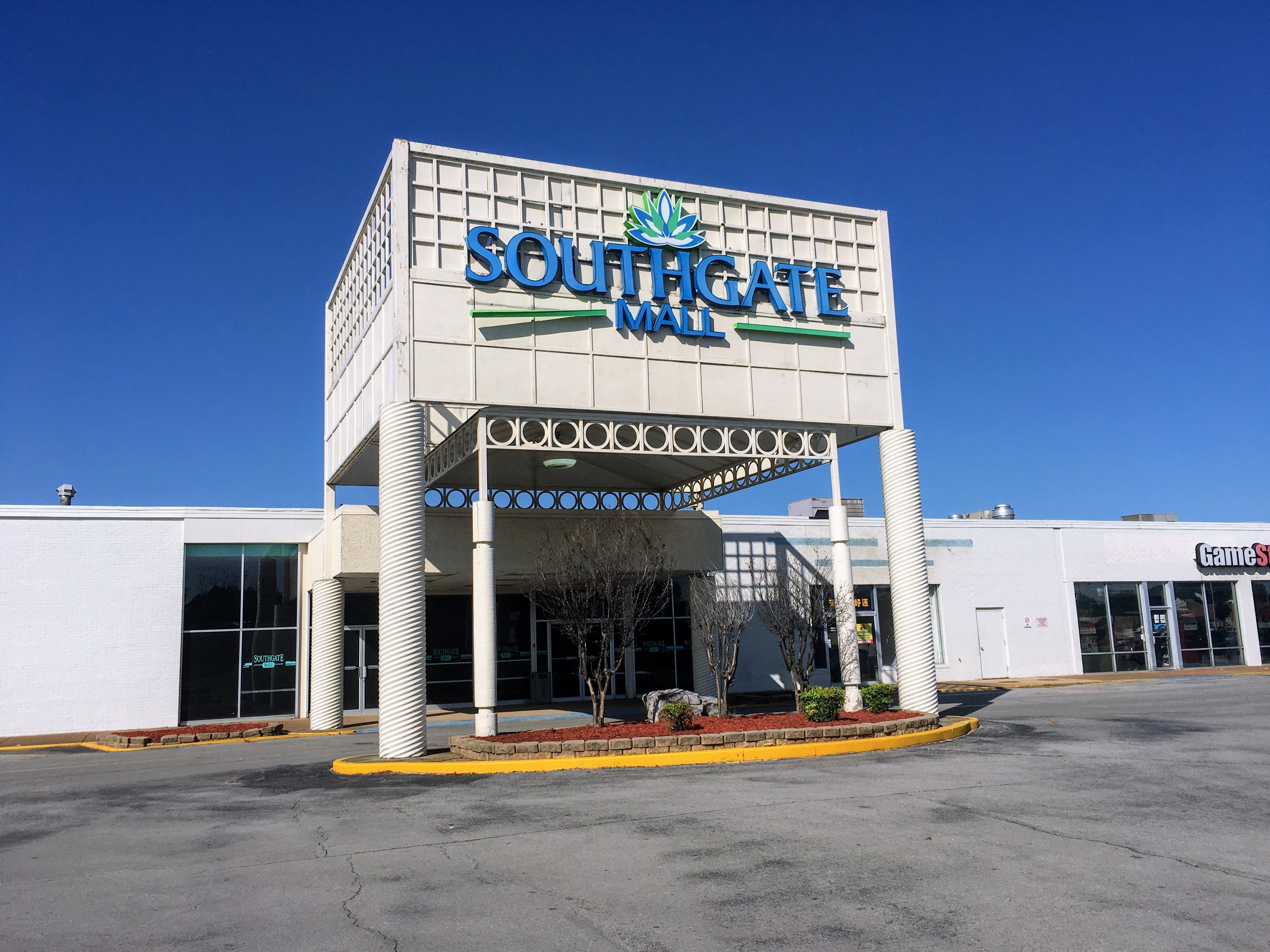
- The former entrance to the enclosed portion of the mall.
- Location: Muscle Shoals, Alabama
- Coordinates: 34.7462°N 87.6720°W
- Opened: 1968 (enclosed mall) 2008 (current open-air shopping center)
- Closed: C. 2005 (enclosed mall); May 31, 2024 (most remaining mall storefronts)
- Developer: Aronov Realty
- Owner: Aronov Realty
- Num. of stores: 20+
- Num. of anchor tenants: 7 (6 open, 1 vacant)
- Floor area: 499,110 sq ft (46,369 m^{2})
- Floors: 1

Southgate Mall is open-air shopping center (formerly an enclosed shopping mall) in Muscle Shoals, Alabama. Around 2005 the inside of the mall closed and the businesses that remained moved to the outside of the mall. Opened in 1968, the anchor stores are Tractor Supply Company, Walgreens, Genesis Jewelry, Pet Supplies Plus, Hibbett Sports, and Burke's Outlet. There is 1 vacant anchor store that was once Rogers. Walmart was a tenant of the mall at one point, but now has its own free-standing store next to the mall.

== History ==
The mall opened in 1968, featuring Woolco and Rogers as its original anchor stores. After Woolco closed in 1983, its space was sold to Walmart, which moved from an existing store in Sheffield. In 1989, mall renovations were announced that included the expansion of the Rogers store, and the opening of Hibbett Sports and Bookland (a division of Books-A-Million).

In 1995, Walmart closed its store in favor of a supercenter located at the opposite end of the mall, in addition to opening a second supercenter in nearby Florence. At the time, the presence of two supercenters in the market was considered unusual. Rogers was acquired by the Dunlaps chain in 1996. At the time, Rogers also had a store at Beltline Mall (now Decatur Mall) in Decatur, Alabama.

Convergys purchased the former Walmart in 2001, and announced plans to convert it to a call center, but later canceled these plans. In 2006, Burke's Outlet opened at the mall, while Tractor Supply Company and a Walgreens call center filled portions of the former Walmart. Many new stores opened in the mid-2000s, although most of them faced the outside of the mall, leaving the interior corridors mostly vacant. Rogers closed in 2007.
