= Charles Schreiner =

Charles Schreiner may refer to:

- Schreiner's, also known as Charles Schreiner & Company, a department store in Kerrville, Texas
- Charles Schreiner (Texas rancher) (1838–1927), Texas rancher and Texas Ranger, namesake of the Capt. Charles Schreiner Mansion
- Charles Schreiner III (1927–2001), his grandson, Texas rancher and businessman
