= North Hills Mall =

North Hills Mall may refer to:

- North Hills (Raleigh), a shopping area in Raleigh, North Carolina, formerly and colloquially known as the North Hills Mall
- North Hills Mall (North Richland Hills), a former shopping mall in North Richland Hills, Texas
