= North East Mall =

Shopping mall in Hurst, Texas

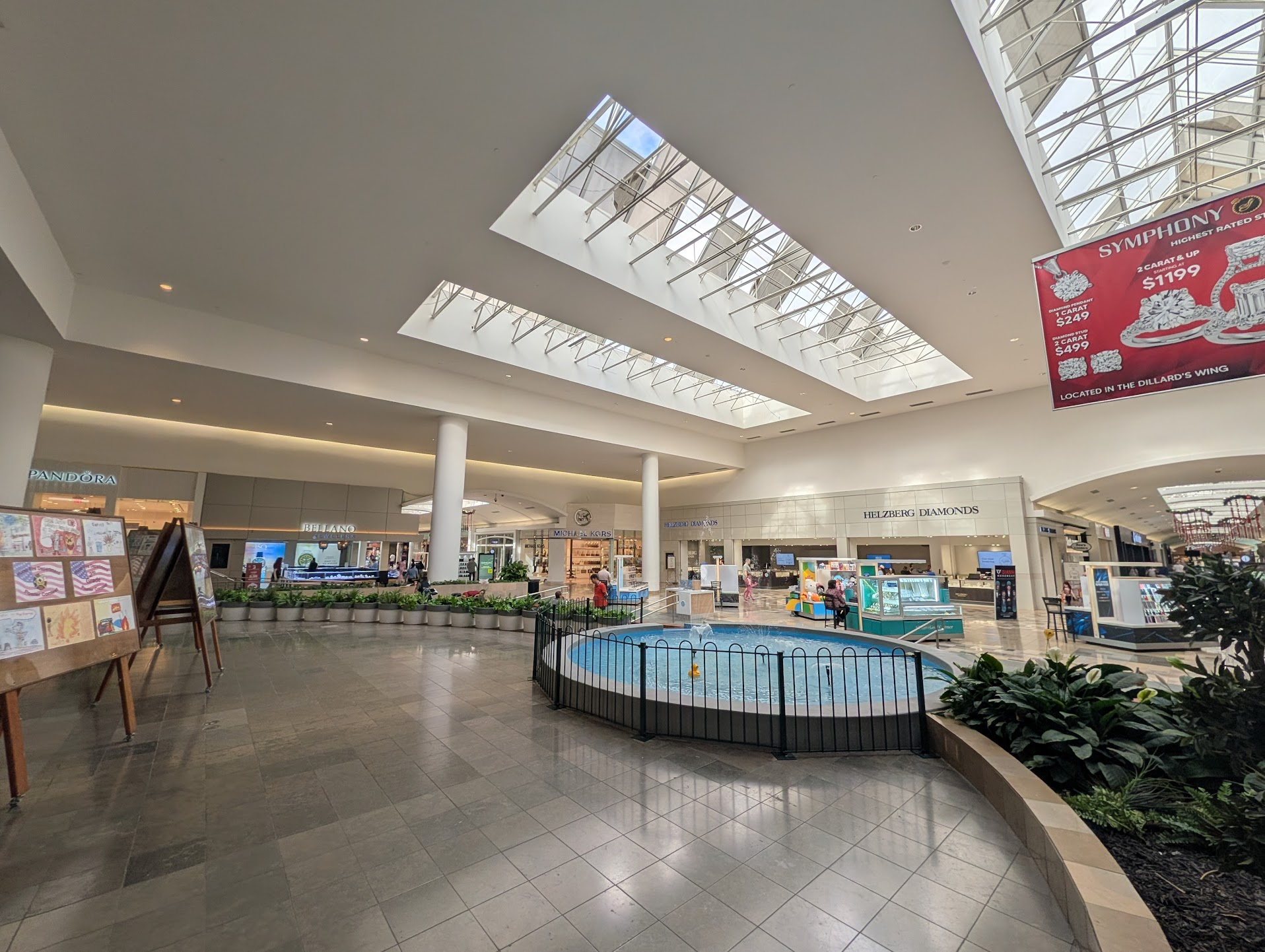
- Central court, October 2025
- Location: Hurst, Texas in Tarrant County, United States
- Coordinates: 32°49′48″N 97°11′59″W
- Address: 1101 Melbourne Rd
- Opened: March 25, 1971; 55 years ago
- Developer: Melvin Simon & Associates
- Manager: Simon Property Group
- Owner: Simon Property Group
- Architect: Omniplan Architects; RTKL Associates
- Num. of stores: 135
- Num. of anchor tenants: 6
- Floor area: 1,543,932 sq ft (143,436.0 m^{2})
- Floors: 1 with partial lower level (2 in JCPenney, Dick's Sporting Goods, former Sears, and former Nordstrom, 3 in Dillard's and Macy's)

North East Mall (previously spelled Northeast Mall) is a super-regional shopping mall in Hurst, Texas, a suburb in the Dallas/Fort Worth metroplex. Located at the intersection of Airport Freeway (SH 121/SH 183) and Interstate 820, the mall is approximately 1.5 million square feet (140,000 m^{2}) and features 135 stores. It is the second-largest indoor mall in Tarrant County, behind only Grapevine Mills in Grapevine.

The mall is anchored by Macy's, Dillard's, Dick's Sporting Goods, Primark, Penney's (a JCPenney-owned test store), and an 18-screen Cinemark theatre, with one additional vacant anchor building.

== History ==
=== 1970–1998: Beginnings ===
Mall logo from 1976 to 1994

The center originated with a Leonard's department store, the Fort Worth-based chain's third location. This store was dedicated July 10, 1970. A single level mall of eighty inline stores was added, which officially opened March 25, 1971. This included a Fort Worth-based Stripling's (inaugurated March 18, 1971) and JCPenney (which commenced operation November 3, 1971). North East Mall now encompassed 750,000 leasable square feet. Sears and Montgomery Ward stores were added, which opened in August 1978. This expansion also added twenty store spaces and the United Artists Cinema 6, along with Panda Express.

A further expansion ensued in 1990 when the mall gained a food court, created from the former location of Service Merchandise.

The gross leasable area of the mall now stood at 1,300,000 square feet (120,000 m^{2}), with 106 inline stores. The mall office is located near Sears.

=== 1999–2004: Expansion and power center ===
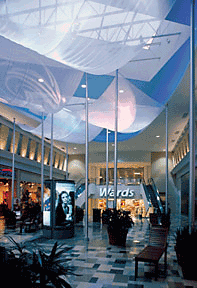
Montgomery Ward (now Cinemark), January 1999

In October 1999, a $200 million renovation and expansion of North East Mall was completed, which included the 385,000 square feet (36,000 m^{2}) power center adjacent to the mall known as The Shops at North East Mall.

At the same time in 1999, the first parking structure was completed. Four parking garages were also constructed as part of the 1998–2001 remodeling. A new South Wing was built, containing 28 store spaces, anchored by a new, 3-level, 310,000 square foot Dillard's.

On September 16, 2000, Saks Fifth Avenue opened as the first and only store in Tarrant County inside a 100,000 square foot space at the mall.

When North East Mall held its official re-dedication on September 15, 2001, the center encompassed 1,749,000 leasable square feet and 168 stores and services. New retailers included Bebe, J. Crew, Abercrombie & Fitch, Talbots, Illuminations, Origins, Aveda, Williams Sonoma, Ann Taylor, Mayors Jewelers, Discovery Channel Store, and more. It was then the second-largest enclosed shopping mall in the Dallas–Fort Worth metroplex and the second-largest in Texas, following The Galleria in Houston.

=== 2005–2019 ===
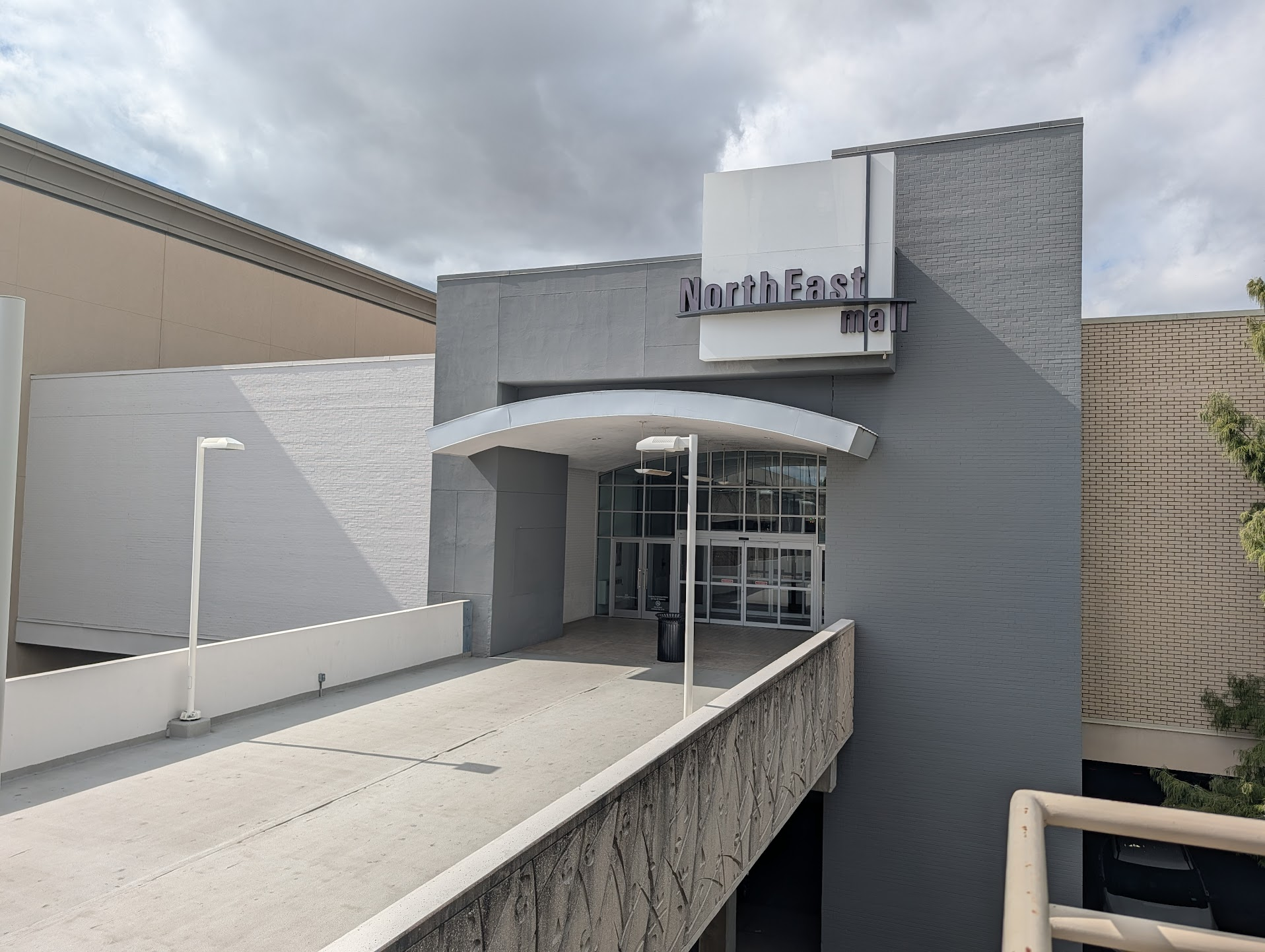
Entrance from garage, showing the mall's former logo, October 2025

In September 2006, Saks Fifth Avenue announced it would be shuttering as part of a strategy implemented to improve profits margins substantially by electing to shutter nearly thirty five percent of its entire base over the course of several years.. The space re-opened as a Dick's Sporting Goods in November 2007.

A BJ's Brewhouse opened outside the mall in 2009.

On January 23, 2014, Dallas Morning News reported that new additions were coming to North East Mall, which were expected to open in spring 2014. On January 27, 2014, KTVT reported that the construction on State Highway 183 was decreasing the population of the mall, as well the sales.

On May 28, 2014, Simon Property Group spun off 98 of its smaller properties into Washington Prime Group, including the Shops at North East Mall power center. Simon continued to own the mall itself.

On August 6, 2019, it was announced that the mall's Sears store would shutter in October.

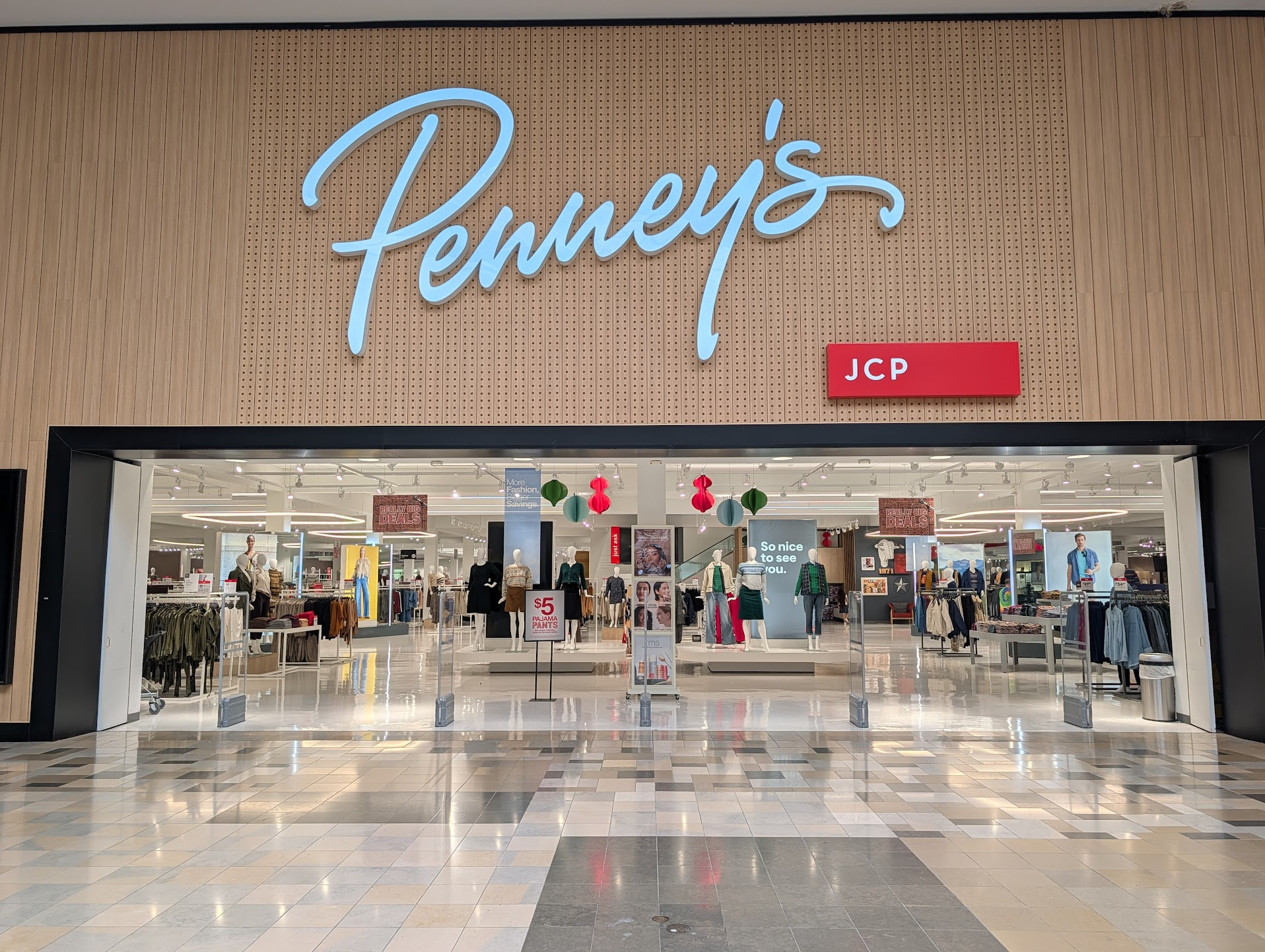
Entrance to Penney's, October 2025

In 2019, the mall's JCPenney store was renovated into Penney's, a test store featuring a salon and barbershop, a coffee lounge, and a spa, as well as regular workshops and classes. The store officially opened on November 1.

=== 2020–present ===
On March 18, 2020, Simon temporarily closed all of its malls, including North East Mall, due to the COVID-19 pandemic.

On May 7, 2020, Nordstrom announced that its location at the mall, which had closed alongside it due to the pandemic, would not reopen. On July 31, 2021, the former Nordstrom space was leased to liquidation store Quicklotz, which opened a store on the building's first floor and converted the second floor into a fulfillment house for its online auction subsidiary UbidUwin.

The mall received a renovation in 2024 that included new paint and lighting, as well as the removal of the center court canopy. The center court fountain was also refurbished.

In November 2024, Quicklotz closed its location at the mall, moving to The Vista in nearby Lewisville. The same month, Irish fast fashion retailer Primark announced plans to open a location at North East Mall. The store opened on April 30, 2026 in Quicklotz's former space.

== Gallery ==
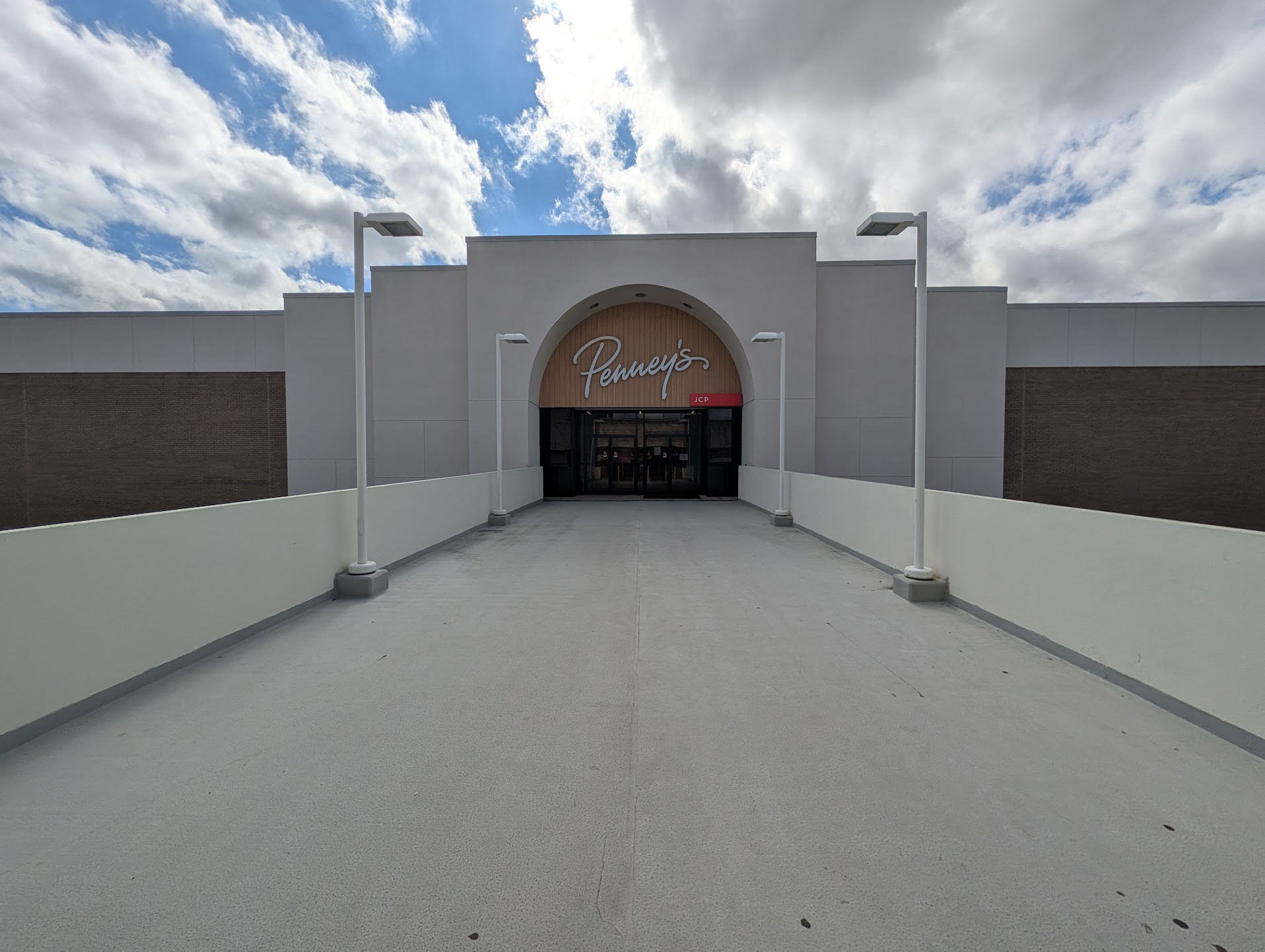
JCPenney 2nd floor entrance, October 2025

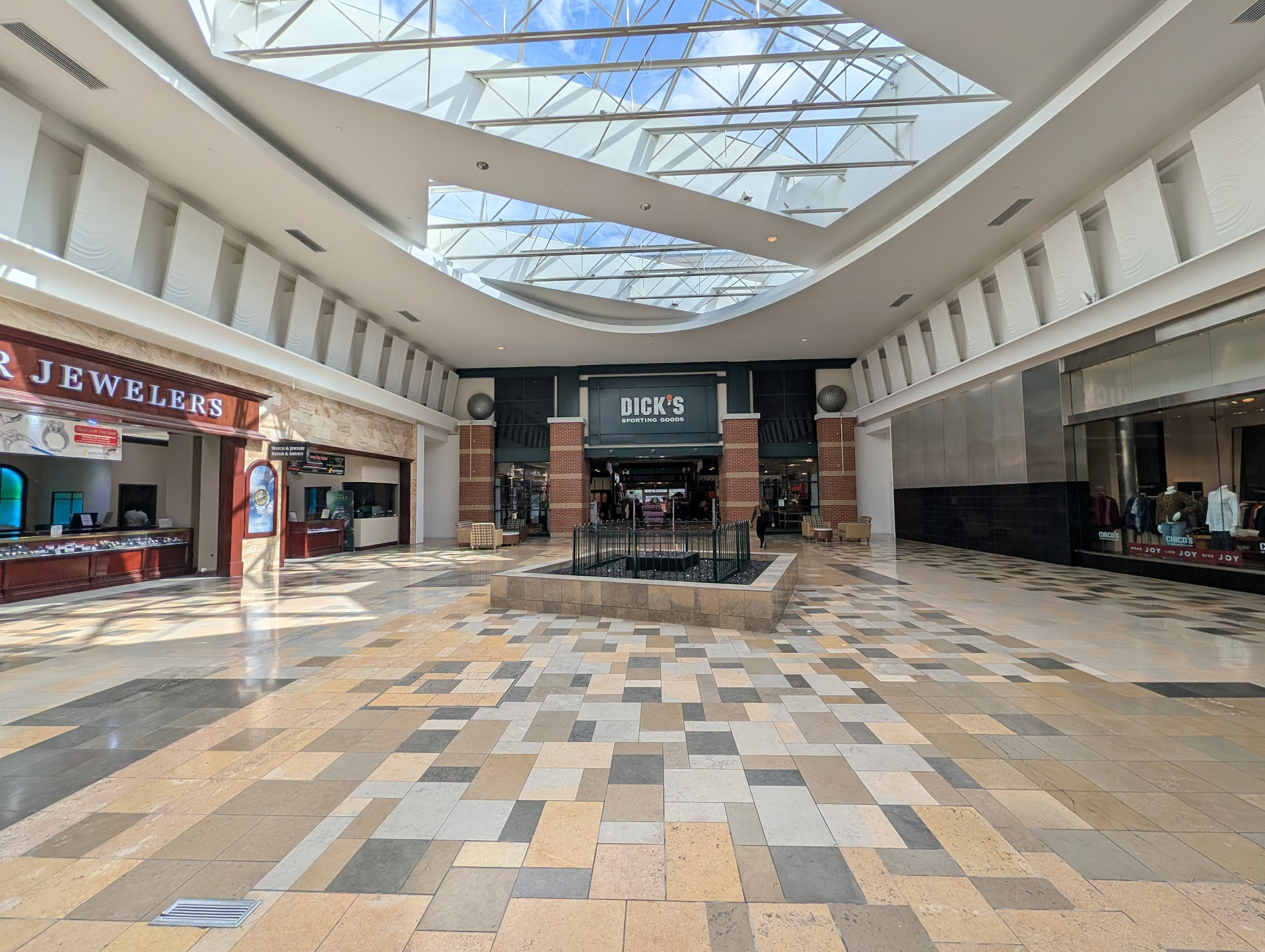
Dick's entrance, October 2025

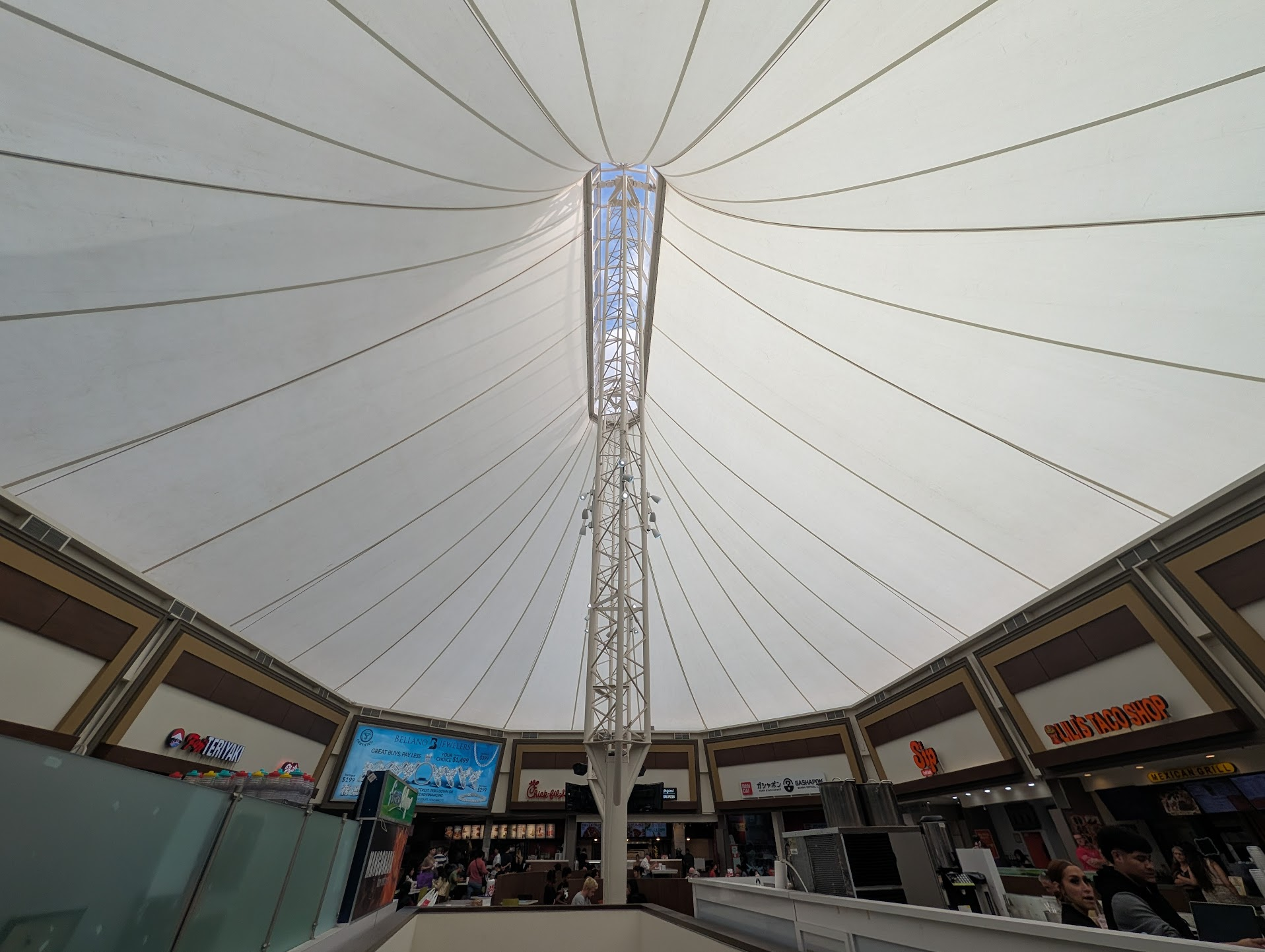
Food court, October 2025

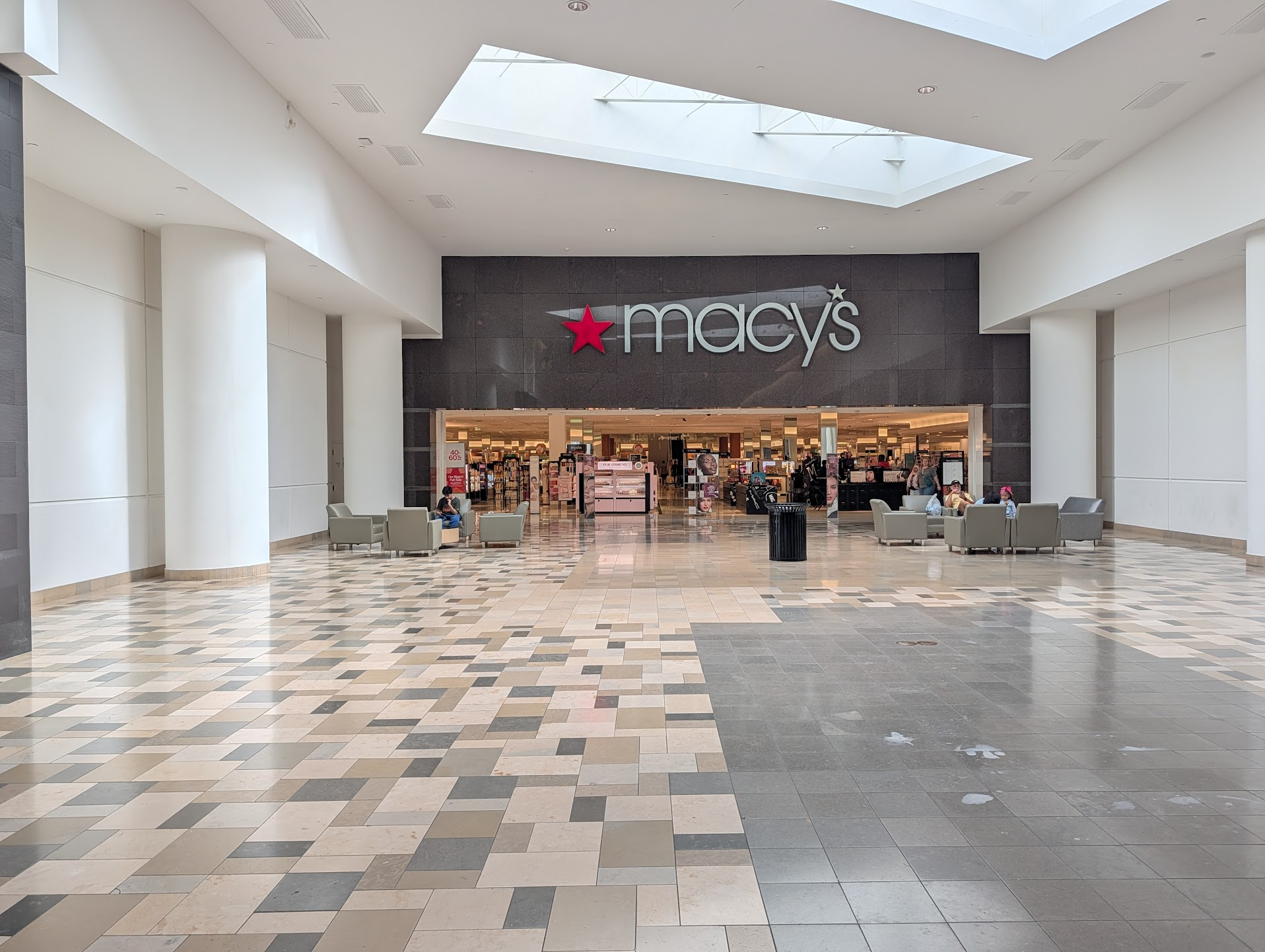
Macy's entrance, October 2025

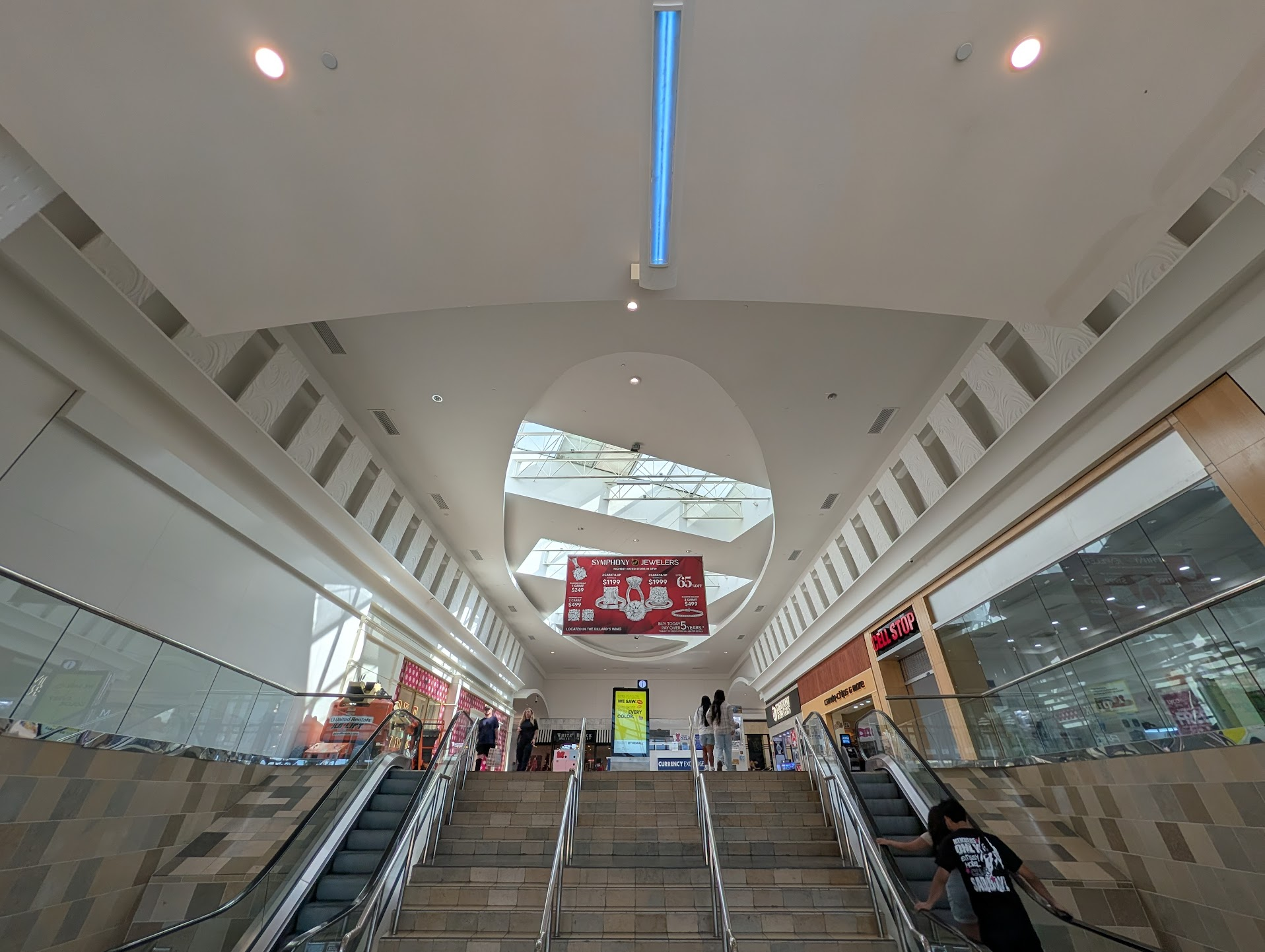
Southeast entrance court, October 2025

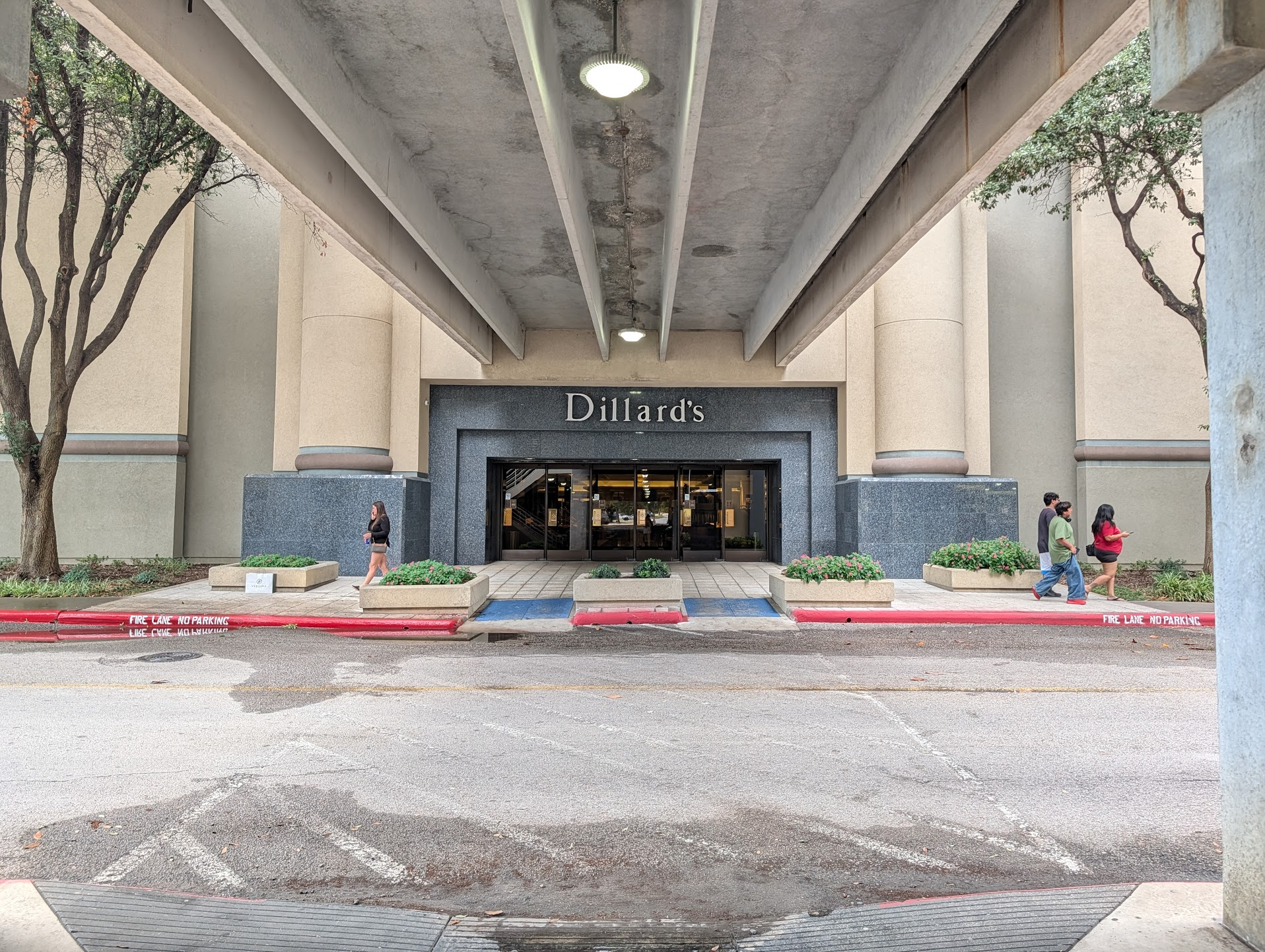
Dillard's 1st floor entrance, October 2025

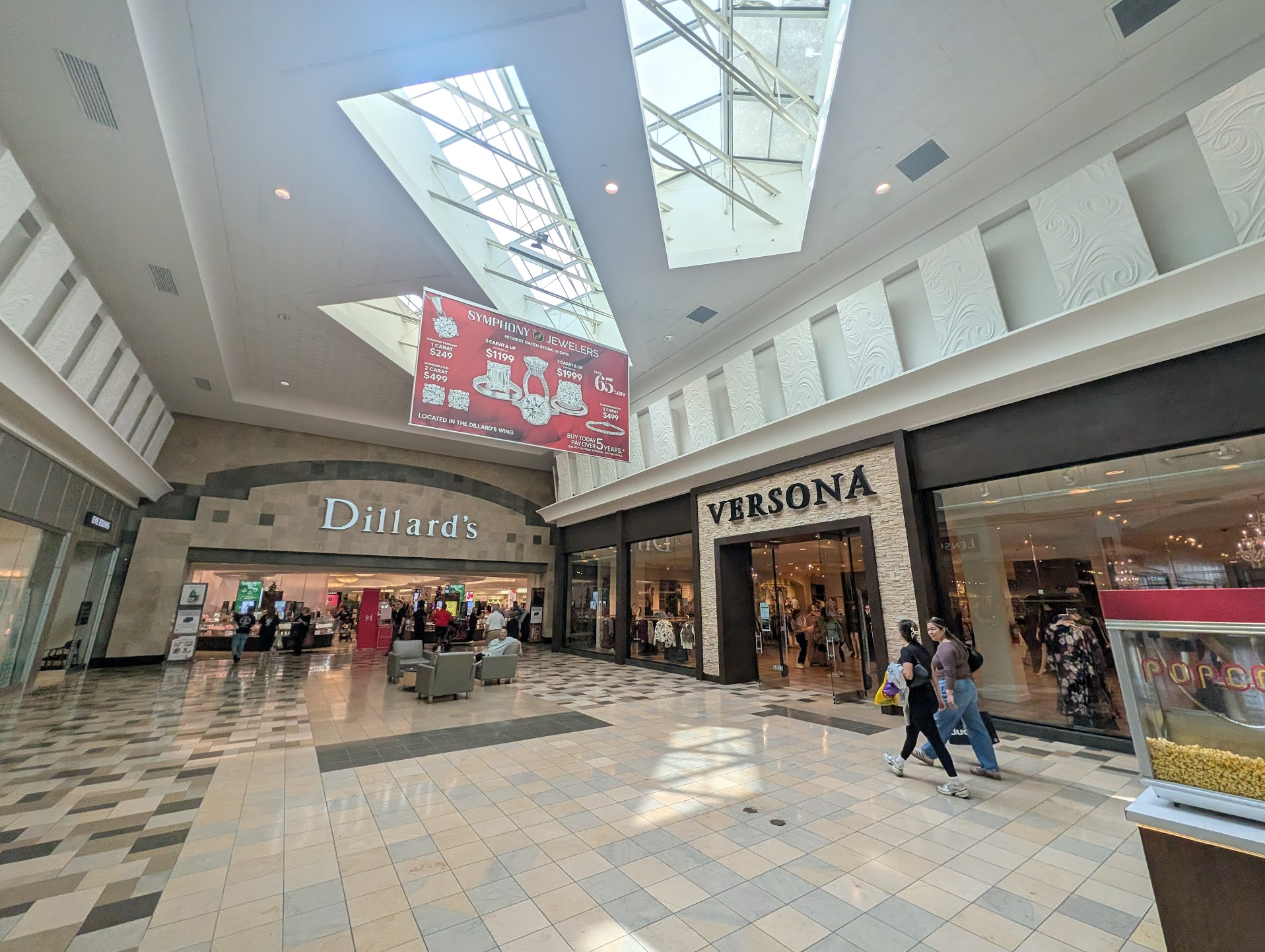
Dillard's court, October 2025

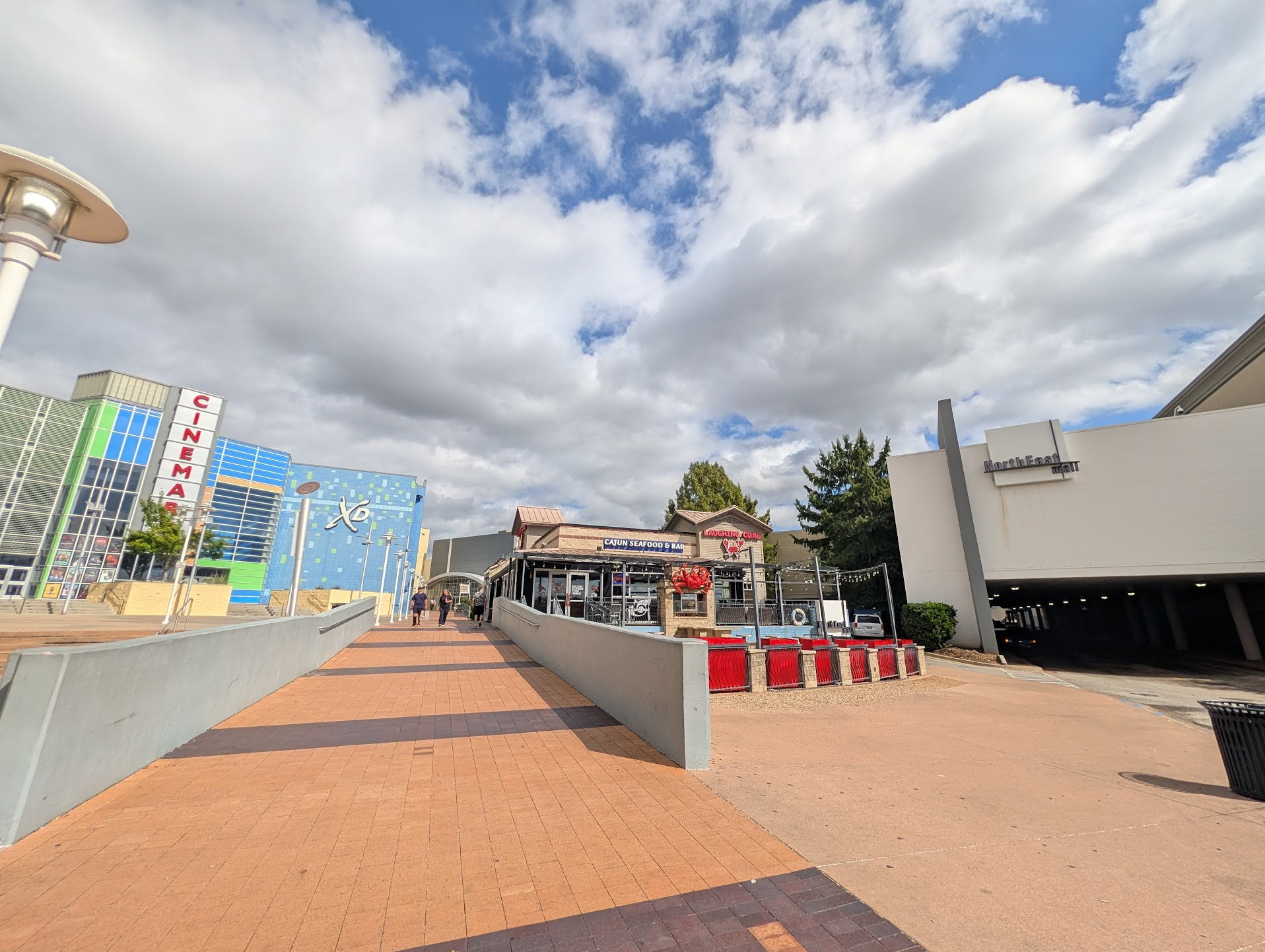
Cinemark and plaza, October 2025

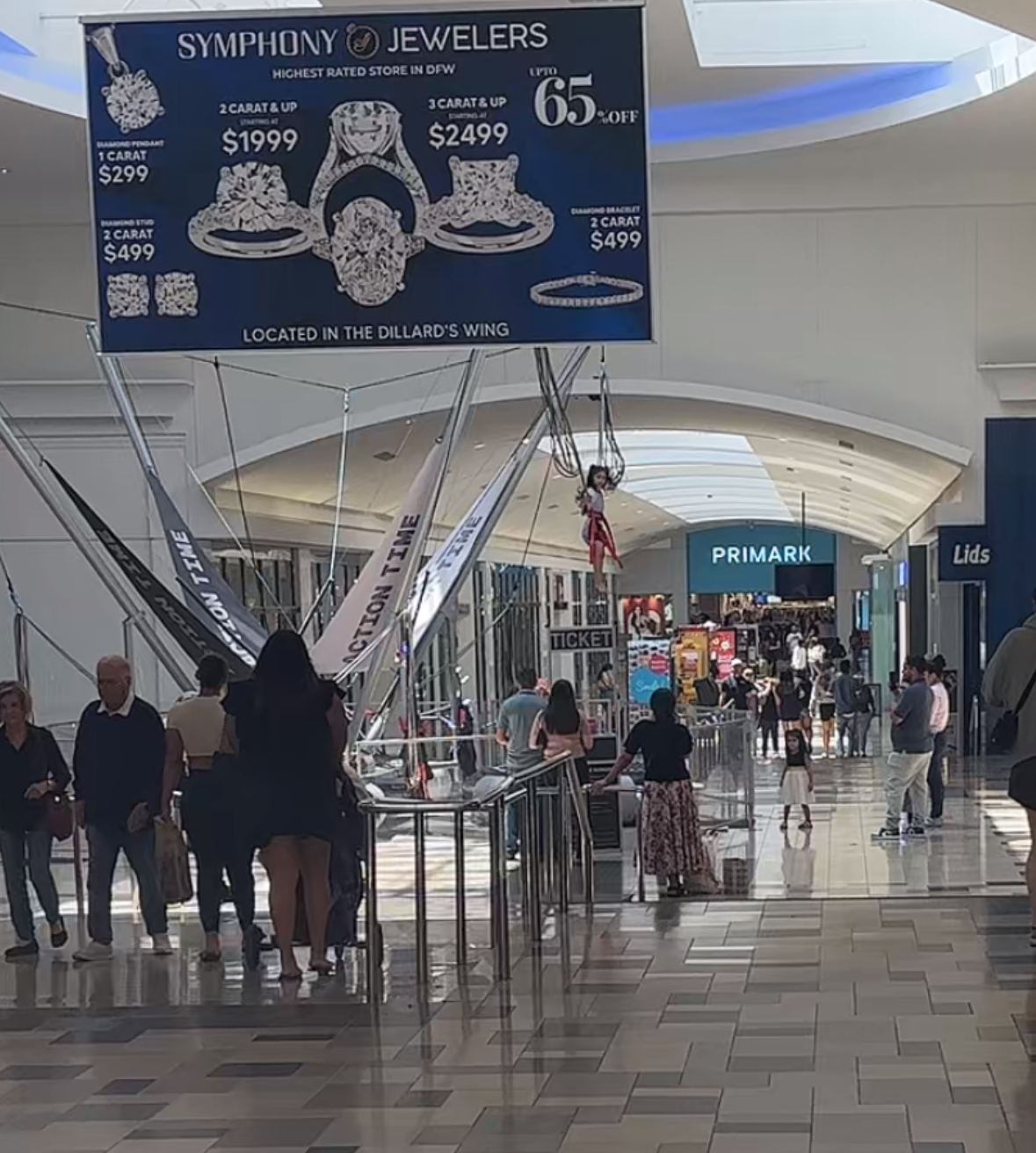
Primark wing, May 2026

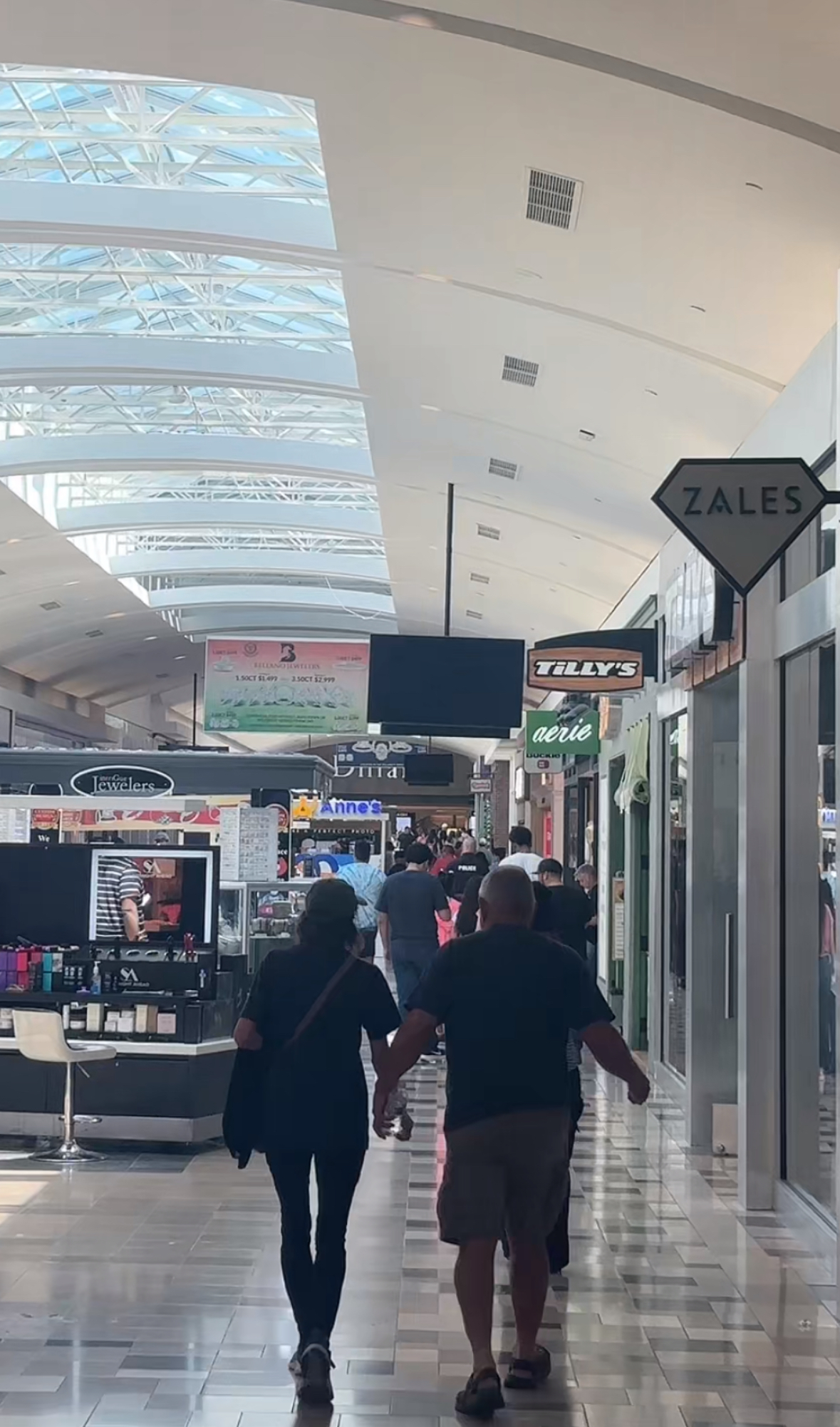
Dillard's wing, May 2026

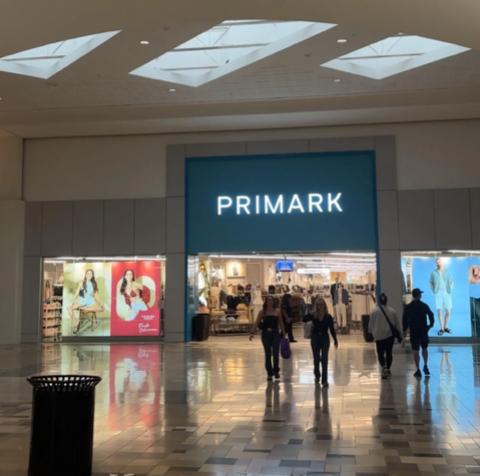
Primark court, May 2026

== See also ==
- Galleria Dallas
- Grapevine Mills
- North Hills Mall (North Richland Hills)
- List of shopping malls in Texas
