= Shops at Billerica =

Coordinates: 42°33′22.7″N 71°15′45.7″W

The Shops at Billerica
- Location: Billerica, Massachusetts
- Opened: 1975 as Billerica Mall; 2011 as The Shops at Billerica
- Num. of stores: 20
- Num. of anchor tenants: 4 (2 open, 2 vacant)
- Floor area: 306,876 sq ft (28,509.7 m^{2})
- Floors: 1

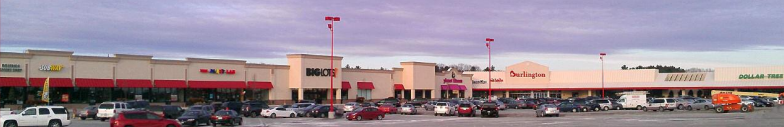
A panorama shot of The Shops at Billerica

The Shops at Billerica (formerly known as Billerica Mall) is a strip mall and former enclosed shopping mall located in Billerica, Massachusetts. It was built as part of a series of malls including the Woburn Mall, and the Mystic Mall. Anchor stores include Burlington and Big Lots.

In 2020, RD Management announced plans to redevelop the property, which were approved in 2021.

== History ==
The Billerica Mall thrived in the 1970s up to the early 1990s. In 1998, The Billerica Flick closed down and the space is now a Dollar Tree. In 2005, Burlington Coat Factory closed off their mall entrance. Home Depot tried to locate there and rebuild the mall, but a group called "Billerica First" defeated this proposal in 2007. In 2009, Billerica gave RD Management 1 year to remodel the mall or it would be shut down. Consequently, RD Management announced that the mall would converted ("de-malled") into a strip mall. In the summer of 2009, a workers' tools created carbon monoxide which caused the entire mall to be evacuated and aired out. In February 2010, the roof by Kmart collapsed and the mall had to be shut down temporarily.

In mid-2011, RD Management began to add exterior-accessible store fronts and refinished the exterior of the mall with a new tan color scheme. A new sign was installed. On the new sign the mall was renamed "Shops at Billerica".

On November 7, 2019, Sears announced that Kmart would be closing as part of a plan to close 96 stores nationwide. The store closed on February 16, 2020.

== Redevelopment ==
In mid-2020, RD Management announced plans to redevelop the site. The plans include demolishing the existing Market Basket, reducing the size of the former Kmart space, constructing a new tenant building across from the existing one, and constructing a multi-story residential component where Market Basket currently stands. The redevelopment plans were approved in early 2021.

On June 10, 2022, it was announced that Market Basket would be closing on June 11, 2022.
