= The Crossroads (Portage, Michigan) =

Shopping mall in Portage, Michigan

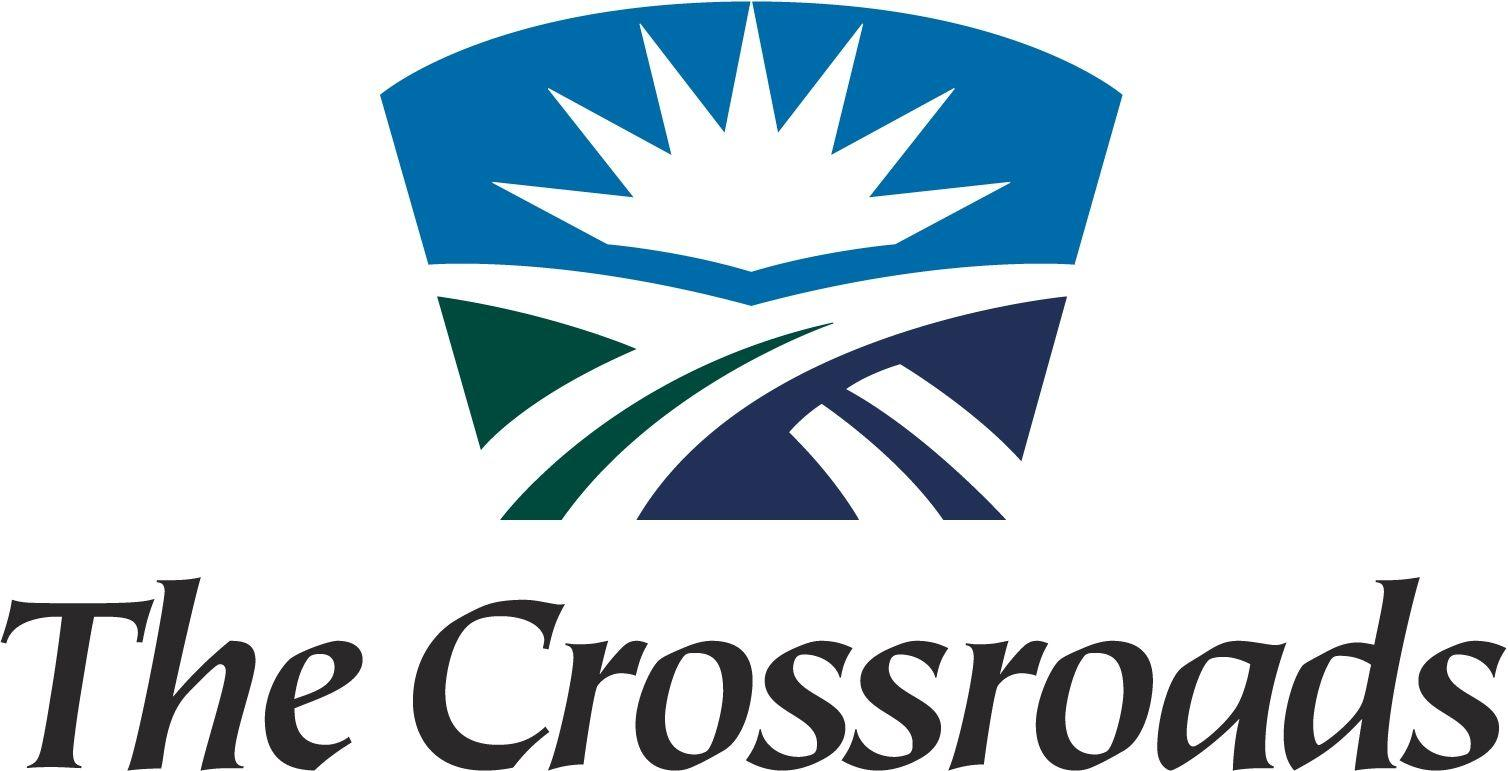

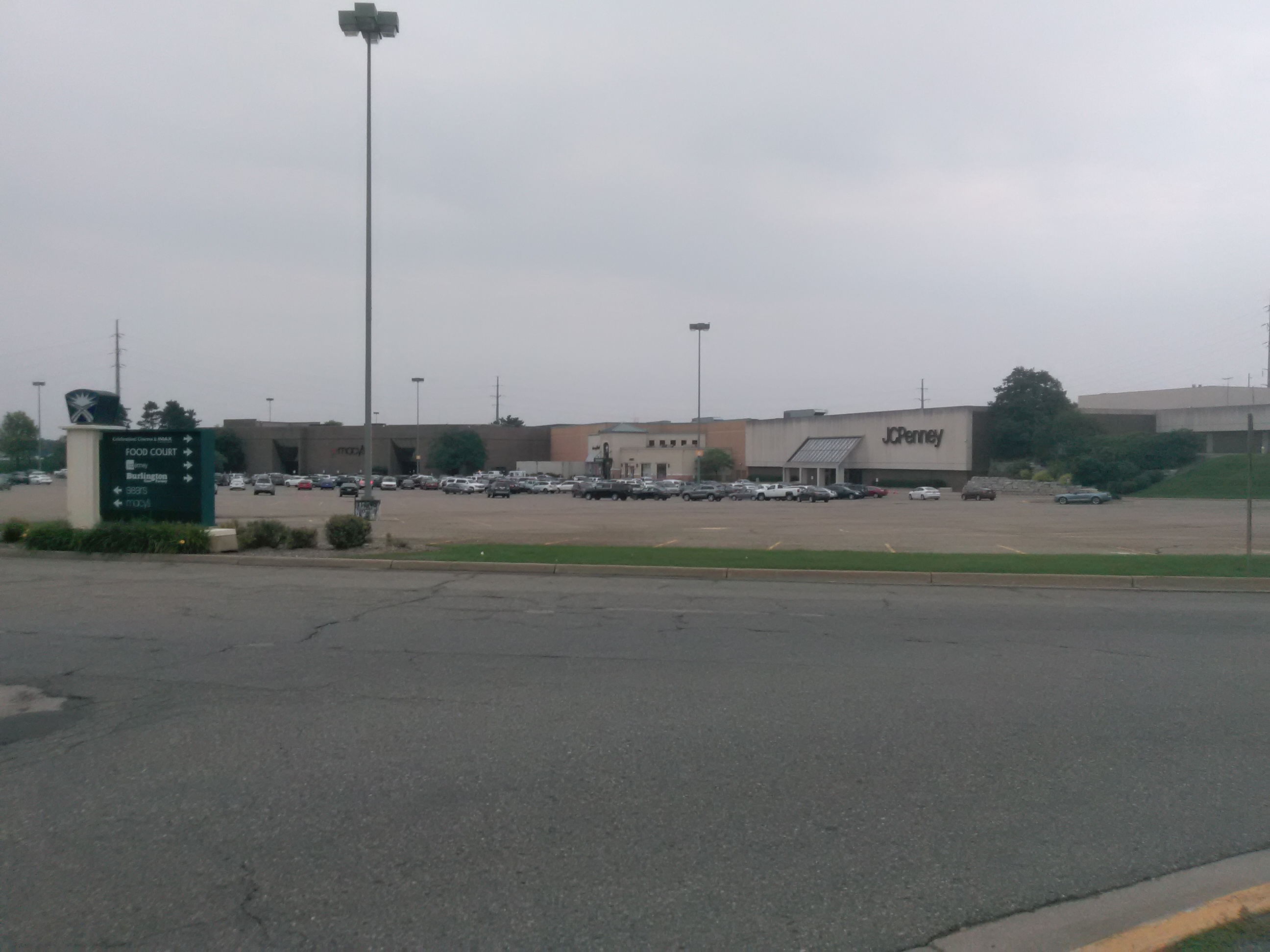
- Location: Portage, Michigan, USA
- Coordinates: 42.2203°N 85.5943°W
- Address: 6650 South Westnedge Avenue, Portage, MI 49024
- Opened: July 24, 1980; 46 years ago
- Renovated: 1982, 2001/02, 2004/05
- Developer: Westcor, Dayton-Hudson Corporation
- Manager: Summit Properties USA
- Owner: Summit Properties USA
- Num. of stores: 80
- Num. of anchor tenants: 4 (3 open, 1 vacant)
- Floor area: 769,801 square feet (71,516.9 m^{2})
- Floors: 2
- Parking: 4006
- Public transit: Metro Transit
- Website: www.thecrossroadsmall.com

The Crossroads is a shopping mall located in Portage, Michigan. The mall features 100 stores and a food court. The anchor tenants are JCPenney, Macy's, and Zap Zone XL. There is 1 vacant anchor store that was once Burlington (previously Mervyn's). The Crossroads Mall had been owned by Brookfield Properties (and predecessor General Growth Properties) from 1999 until its sale to Kohan Retail Investment Group in January 2022.

== History ==
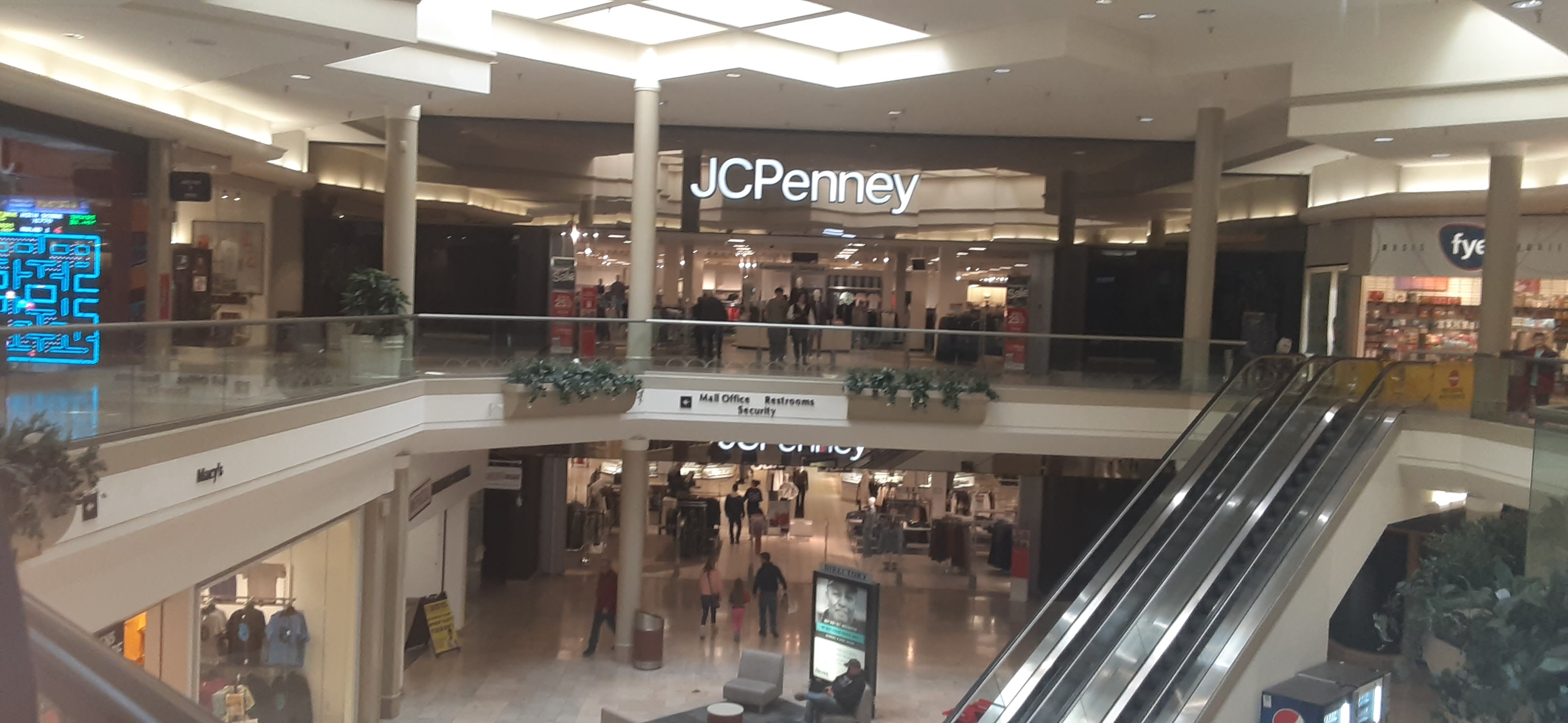
JCPenney court in the mall in 2023

The Crossroads Mall in the City of Portage in Michigan was built in association with Dayton-Hudson Corporation, who owned the Detroit-based Hudson's chain at the time and Westcor, who built The Orchards Mall in Benton Harbor. The mall was built along South Westnedge Avenue south of Interstate 94. The mall opened along with most of its stores on July 24. 1980. At the time, it was the only two-level mall in Michigan outside Metro Detroit.

The mall opened with a JCPenney and a Hudson's as its first two anchors. Tenants on opening day included Arby's, Casual Corner, Claire's, County Seat, B. Dalton, Hickory Farms, Kinney Shoes, and Consumer Value Stores. The mall at this point was relatively small and did not contain a proper food court, instead many of the malls eateries were scattered around. After 1981, the rest of the malls stores opened fully. In 1982, the mall's third anchor, Sears, was added along with an addition to the mall. On December 11, 1987, the United Artists Movies at the Crossroads, a ten screen theater opened behind the mall. In 1989, Mervyn's of California was added as the mall's third anchor. The store was a part of Mervyn's plan to expand in Michigan. In 1999, the mall was acquired by General Growth Properties, who also owned the nearby Lakeview Square Mall in Battle Creek. Hudson's was renamed Marshall Field's in 2001, and subsequently became Macy's in September 2006. Mervyn's closed in early 2006 along with the rest of the chain's Michigan stores, and Burlington Coat Factory opened its first Kalamazoo store in the space vacated by Mervyn's. On November 10, 2019, Sears closed. In 2021 Burlington Coat relocated to the former Value City Furniture at the Maple Hill Pavilion in Kalamazoo. The mall was purchased for $25 million in January 2022 by the Kohan Retail Investment Group. In September of 2024, Summit Properties USA became the new owners and managers of the mall. On February 16, 2026, Zap Zone XL opened in the former Sears.
