= Southall Drugs =

- U.S. National Register of Historic Places
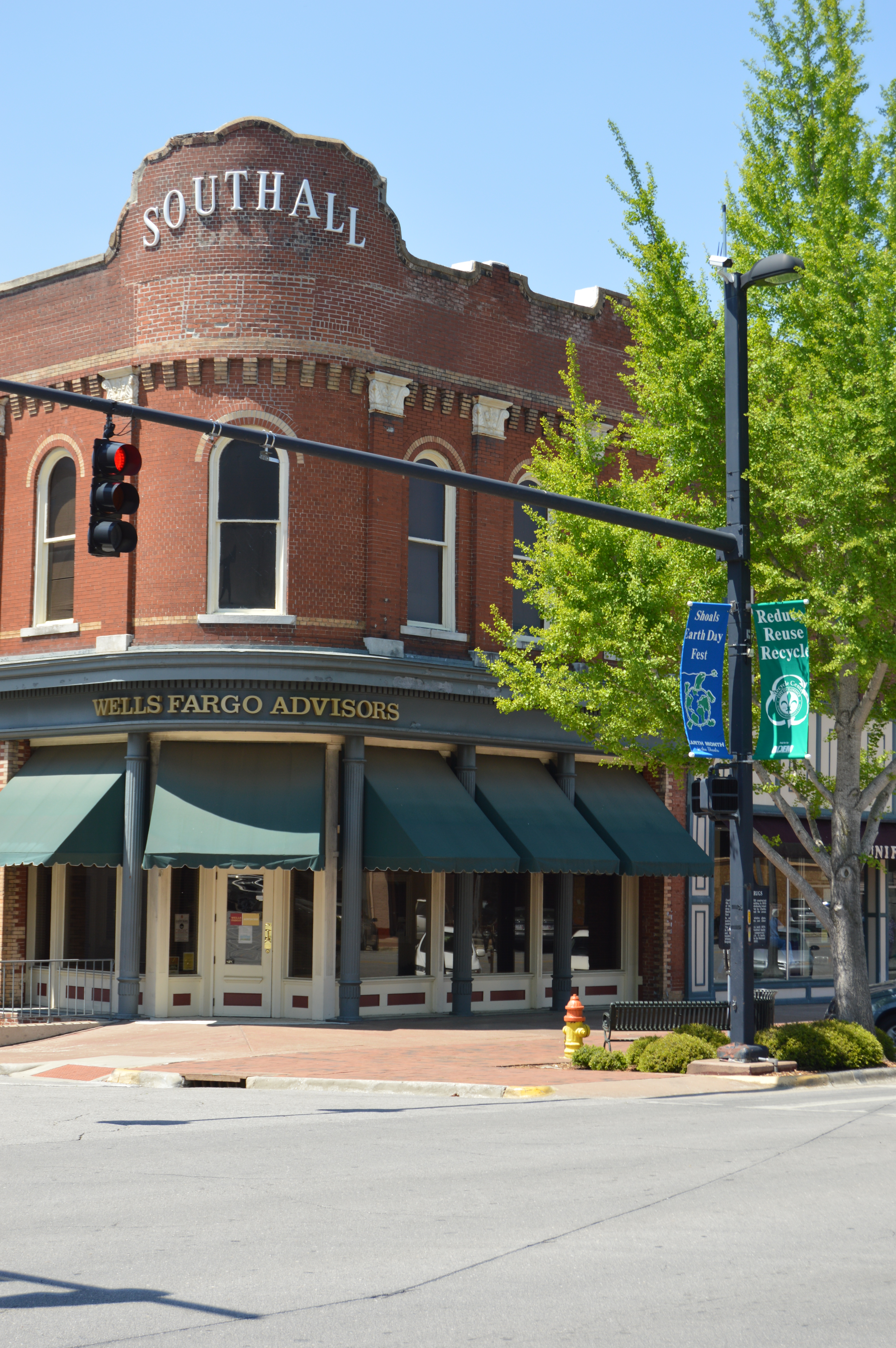
- The building in April 2014

- Location within Alabama Location within the United States
- Location: 201 N. Court St., Florence, Alabama
- Coordinates: 34°48′4″N 87°40′36″W
- Area: less than one acre
- Built: 1900
- Architectural style: Italianate
- Part of: Downtown Florence Historic District
- NRHP reference No.: 80000699
- Added to NRHP: August 21, 1980

Southall Drugs is a historic commercial building in Florence, Alabama. It was built in 1900 to house the pharmacy of Charles Morton Southall. The pharmacy operated until 1979, and was renovated in 1982 to have loft apartments on the second floor and retail on the ground floor.

The Italianate building sits at the corner of Court and Mobile Streets in the Downtown Florence Historic District. The Rogers Department Store building sits across Mobile Street. The building has a distinctive rounded corner, with a raised parapet containing arched letters "SOUTHALL" mimicking a corner turret. The storefront has a heavy metal cornice supported by four round, fluted columns. Four large display windows and the recessed entry are covered by canvas awnings. The side of the building on the first floor has eight arched windows, the first five of which are shorter and higher to clear the display racks inside. The second floor features arched one-over-one sash windows, one in each bay over the storefront and in every other bay along the side. The bays are separated by brick pilasters, resting on limestone plinths and capped with stamped metal Corinthian capitals. The pilasters support a projecting course of brick, with corbels between the pilasters.

The building was listed on the National Register of Historic Places in 1980.
