= The Shops at Westshore =

- Location: Holland, Michigan
- Coordinates: 42.8155°N 86.0876°W
- Opened: August 3, 1988
- Developer: Bramalea
- Owner: Westshore Mall Investors LLC
- Num. of stores: approx. 50
- Num. of anchor tenants: 4
- Floor area: 325,238 square feet
- Floors: 1
- Public transit: MAX
- Website: theshopsatwestshore.com

The Shops at Westshore, formerly Westshore Mall, is an open air shopping mall in Holland, Michigan. It opened in 1988 and the mall's anchor tenants are Burlington, Grand Rapids Community College, Dunham's Sports, and Holland Charter Township Community Center.

== History ==
Bramalea built the mall in 1988. Its original anchors were JCPenney, Sears, Prange's (which converted to Younkers in 1992), and Steketee's.

The Steketee's store, the last one in the chain, closed in 2003. The same year, its space was converted to Dunham's Sports. Sears closed in 2004 and became Steve & Barry's from February 2007 to December 2008.

JJ Finnegan's restaurant, an original tenant, closed its location at the mall in 2009. Afterward, the mall owners took the restaurant owners to court for failure to pay rent. At this point, Westshore Mall was over 30 percent vacant. The increasing vacancy came from increased competition when the larger Rivertown Crossings and The Lakes Mall were built nearby. In 2010, a bank purchased the mall for $7.8 million.

In November 2014, a local developer announced plans to begin "de-malling" the complex into an outdoor shopping mall. Work began on "de-malling" in mid-2015. The only stores remaining operational throughout the reconstruction are JCPenney, Younkers, Dunham's Sports, Buckle, and GNC. Also at this point, the complex was renamed The Shops at Westshore. On March 23, 2016, it was announced that Burlington Coat Factory was opening in the space formerly occupied by Sears. On that same day, it was announced that Fed Ex Office was being relocated from across US-31. Also, on that same day, it was announced that Disc Traders and T-Mobile were both opening as well. On March 17, 2017, it was announced that JCPenney was closing as part of a plan to close 138 stores. JCPenney closed on July 31, 2017. Younkers closed in 2018.

In 2019, it was announced that Urban Air Trampoline Park would be opening, and that Grand Rapids Community College would open classrooms in the former JCPenney.
