= Heironimus =

Historic commercial building in Virginia, United States

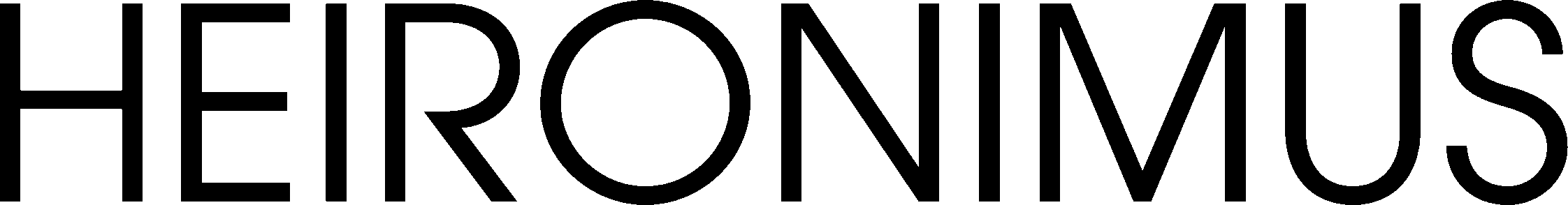

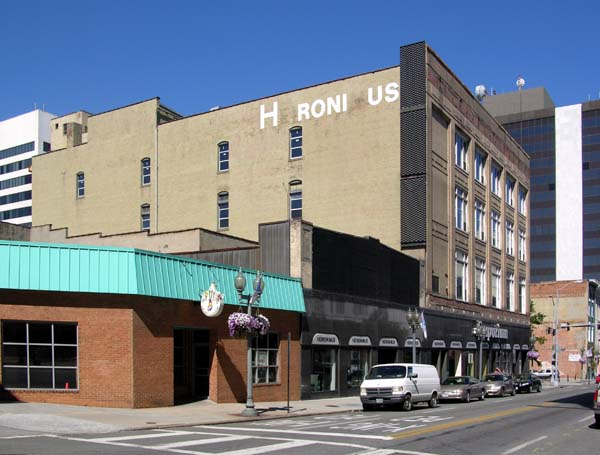
- Former flagship store in Downtown Roanoke, Virginia
- Company type: Private (1890-1993); Brand of Dunlaps (1993-2005)
- Industry: Department store
- Predecessor: Heironimus & Brugh
- Founded: Roanoke, Virginia, U.S. (1890)
- Founder: S.H. Heironimus & L.K. Brugh
- Defunct: January 2005
- Fate: Dissolved
- Headquarters: Roanoke, Virginia (1890-1993); Fort Worth, Texas (1993-2005)
- Area served: Southwest Virginia

S.H. Heironimus Co. (also known as Heironimus) was an American department store chain based in Roanoke, Virginia. S.H. Heironimus opened his first store in downtown Roanoke in 1890. At its peak, Heironimus had several locations around Roanoke and Lynchburg. In 1993, Heironimus was acquired by the Texas-based retailer Dunlaps, which initially invested in improving the stores' inventory and appearance. In January 1996, the chain's flagship store in Downtown Roanoke was closed but locations in area malls remained open.

The chain occupied the increasingly untenable niche between discount stores like Wal-Mart and the variety and more upscale merchandise available at regional malls. In 2004, Dunlaps announced that the remaining Heironimus stores would close as their inventory was liquidated. The Spartan Square location in Salem was the last to remain open before closing in January 2005.

The S.H. Heironimus Warehouse was listed on the National Register of Historic Places in 2006. In 2020, the renovated former flagship store in downtown Roanoke reopened as an upscale apartment building with Mast General Store occupying the lower levels.
