= MM Cohn =

- Company type: Defunct subsidiary of The Dunlap Company
- Industry: Retail
- Founded: 1874; 152 years ago|
- Defunct: September 16, 2007; 18 years ago
- Fate: Liquidation
- Headquarters: Little Rock, Arkansas
- Key people: Mark Matthias Cohn, founder Dan Phillips, chairman (1981-1989); Joyace Hart, manager (Little Rock)
- Products: Clothing, footwear, jewelry, beauty products, and housewares.

The M.M. Cohn Company, more popularly known simply as MM Cohn, was a regional specialty department store chain in Arkansas, based in Little Rock. Independently operated from its opening until 1989, the chain was purchased by The Dunlap Company of Fort Worth, Texas, which operated the stores until their closure. Amid a forced liquidation of Dunlaps and its associated stores through the end of 2007, MM Cohn's remaining stores closed on September 16, 2007.

== History ==
The namesake of its founder, Mark Matthias Cohn, the chain was founded in 1874 in Arkadelphia, Arkansas. The first Cohn store in Little Rock was at 102 Main Street near the Capitol Hotel. In 1898, Cohn moved to a store on Main Street between Third and Fourth streets. It was one of Main Street's largest, and the number of employees grew from five to 24. The downtown store was moved again in 1940 to the 75,000-SF building between Capitol and Sixth on Main that still carries the company name on its front. Also in 1898, Cohn's son, Albert Daniel Cohn, joined the company. He had been an engineer with the Army Corps of Engineers, but in 1912 he took over as president. (M.M. Cohn had another son, Victor, who died at age 19). M.M. Cohn also had two daughters, but they never became involved in the company business.

Cohn's grandson, Dan Phillips, started in the business when he was very young and held nearly every position. Phillips became the one most responsible for building MM Cohn into a respected regional chain, particularly in its competition with in-town rival Dillard's. Although he worked as a youngster, he joined the store full-time in 1951. He became president in 1969 and chairman in 1981.

At its height, The M.M. Cohn Co. operated 12 stores. By the time it was sold, there were 11, because the company had closed the downtown Little Rock store. Since 1989, the chain has operated as a division of The Dunlap Company, a privately held company headquartered in Fort Worth, Texas.

According to an Arkansas Democrat-Gazette report published on June 14, 2007, the MM Cohn stores were to be among more than 40 Dunlap-owned stores in eight states to close by the end of 2007. The liquidation followed news of Dunlaps defaulting on secured loan obligations to Wells Fargo Retail Finance and inability to obtain new financing. The total debt owed to Dunlaps' creditors, as indicated by a creditor's letter obtained by the newspaper for its report, totaled about $14 million.
