= Florence Post Office =

Post office in Colorado

- US Post Office--Florence Main
- U.S. National Register of Historic Places
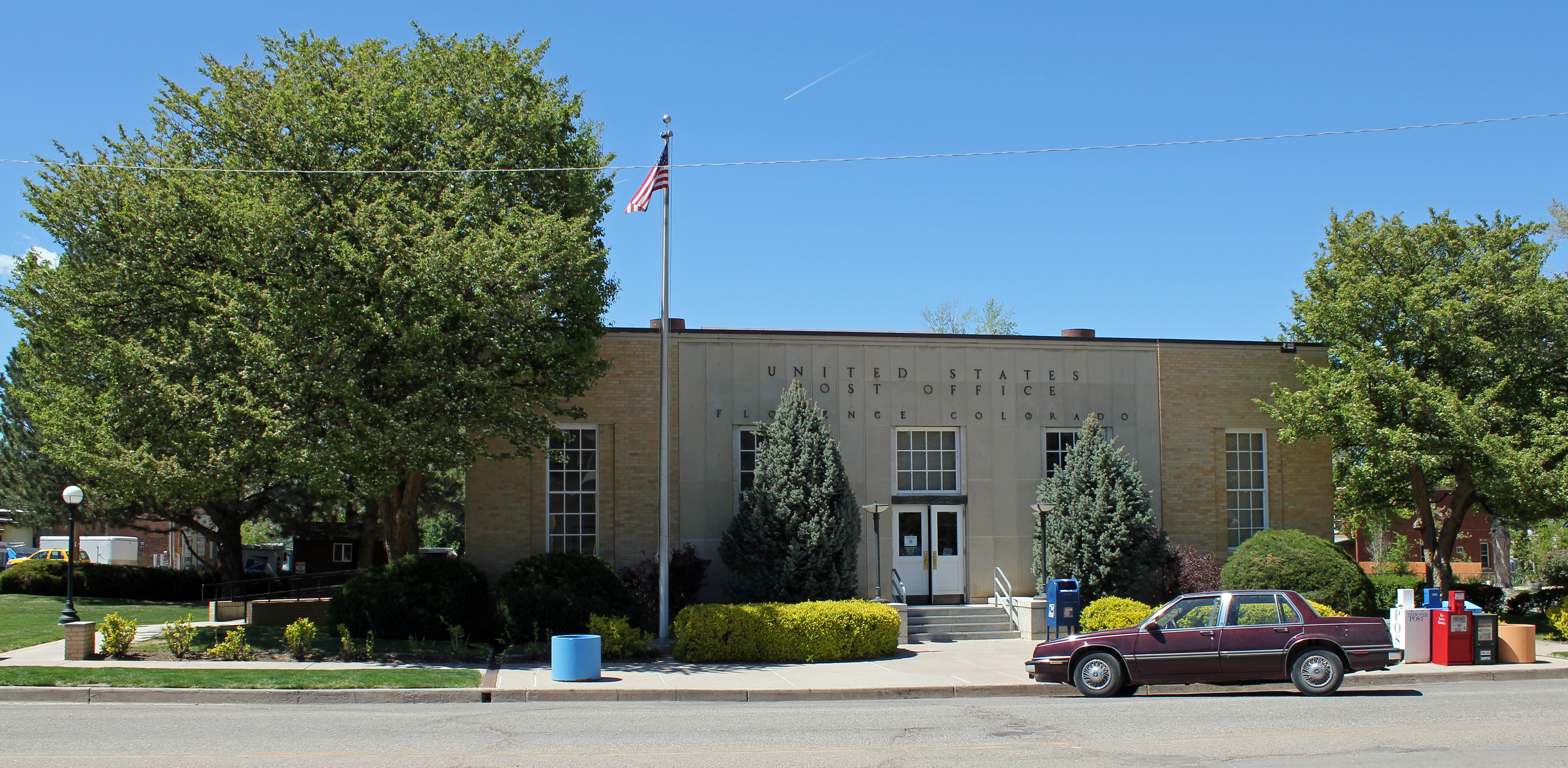

- Location within Colorado
- Location: 121 N. Pikes Peak St., Florence, Colorado
- Coordinates: 38°23′27″N 105°07′03″W
- Area: 0.5 acres (0.20 ha)
- Built: 1936
- Architect: Louis A. Simon
- Architectural style: Classical Revival, Art Deco, Starved Classical
- Part of: Downtown Florence Historic District
- MPS: US Post Offices in Colorado, 1900--1941, TR
- NRHP reference No.: 86000174
- Added to NRHP: January 22, 1986

The Florence Post Office, at 121 N. Pikes Peak St. in Florence, Colorado, was built in 1936. It was listed on the National Register of Historic Places in 1986 as US Post Office-Florence Main.

It was designed by Louis A. Simon in Starved Classical style.

It includes a WPA mural painted by Olive Rush in 1937, showing a group of antelope.
