= Steketee's =

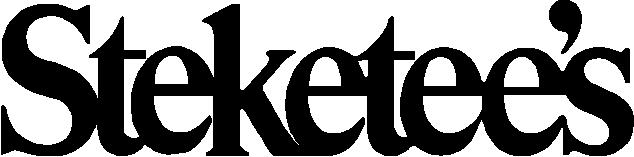
Steketee's logo

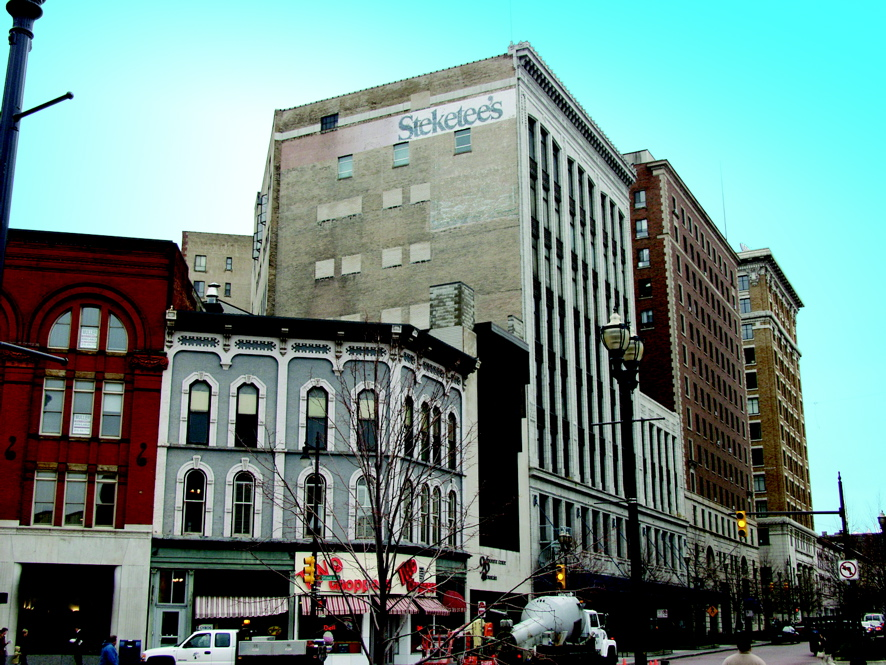
The former downtown Grand Rapids Steketee's with department store signage still visible in 2005.

Steketee's /ˈstɛkɪtiːz/ was a department store based in Grand Rapids, Michigan, United States. It was begun in 1862 in Grand Rapids, and soon grew to several stores throughout southwestern Michigan. After a purchase by the Dunlaps company of Fort Worth, Texas in the early 1990s, the stores were gradually closed, with the last store closing in 2003.

== History ==
Paul Steketee, a Dutch immigrant, came to Grand Rapids in 1850. In 1862 Steketee and John H. Doornich formed a dry goods operation that would become one of West Michigan's oldest retailers. The two ran the store for 10 years before a fire devastated the business. Following the fire, Doornich sold out to Steketee, who brought his family on board to help run and rebuild the operation. With the growth of Grand Rapids, the family decided to build a larger 8-story flagship store on Monroe Avenue, the city's retail hub. The store opened with much fanfare in 1915. The draw of Steketee's Grand Rapids store was big enough that the family decided to expand its operations in the 1950s, opening its first satellite store in 1958.

== Sale and demise ==
In 1991, Dunlaps, a Fort Worth, Texas department store company, bought out the Steketee's family, bringing the West Michigan operations under their umbrella of brands. After being bought by a Texan company, Steketee's downtown Grand Rapids store and its other locations were affected by changes in retail patterns and the rise of national brands. The Steketee store at Maple Hill Mall in Kalamazoo closed in 2003. The downtown store closed in 1998. Dunlap's shuttered its last Steketee's store in 2003 with the closing of the Westshore Mall location.

The vacant downtown Grand Haven Steketee's building has been adapted as the Tri-Cities Historical Museum.
