= Downtown Florence Historic District (Florence, Alabama) =

Historic district in Alabama, United States

- U.S. National Register of Historic Places
- U.S. Historic district
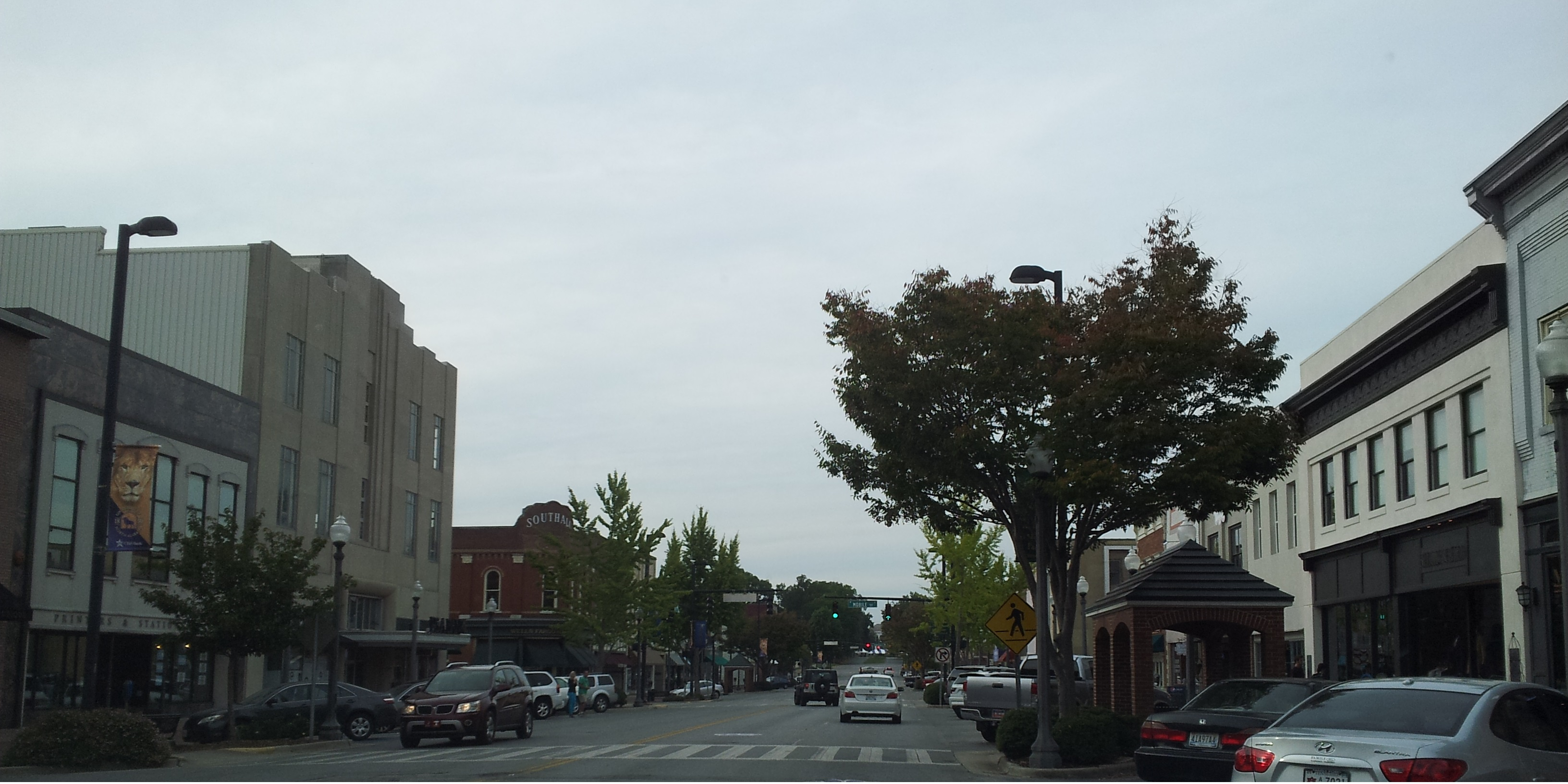
- Buildings on Court Street in September 2012

- Location within Alabama Location within the United States
- Location: Roughly bounded by Pine St., Alabama St., Wood Ave., and Tuscaloosa St., Florence, Alabama
- Coordinates: 34°48′0″N 87°40′31″W
- Area: 2 acres (0.81 ha)
- Architectural style: Classical Revival, Italianate, Romanesque
- NRHP reference No.: 95001021 (original); 01001292 (increase)

Significant dates
- Added to NRHP: August 22, 1995
- Boundary increase: December 18, 2001

The Florence Downtown Historic District is a historic district in Florence, Alabama. Florence was founded in 1818 by the Cypress Land Company, who counted among its trustees Creek War General John Coffee, future Governor of Alabama Thomas Bibb, early Huntsville settler LeRoy Pope, and future United States Senator and Supreme Court Justice John McKinley. The company hired Italian surveyor Ferdinand Sannoner, who divided the land into over 400 lots and named the town after Florence, Italy. The first Lauderdale County Courthouse was completed in 1822, and the oldest extant building in the district, the Gothic Revival First Presbyterian Church, was completed two years later. Most of the early buildings were destroyed by a fire in 1866. Development resumed in earnest in the 1880s as Florence's industrial economy developed with the addition of several cotton mills, and the Florence Wagon Works, among others. Other booms occurred in the 1920s with the construction of Wilson Dam, the establishment of the Tennessee Valley Authority in the 1930s, and during World War II as metals and chemical plants were drawn to the area.

The majority of buildings in the district are either one- or two-story brick commercial blocks, the older buildings having Italianate and Classical Revival detailing. Notable buildings in the district include the Art Deco Rogers Department Store, the Italianate Southall Drugs, the U.S. Post Office and Courthouse built in 1913, and the Art Moderne old Public Library, built in 1944. The district was listed on the National Register of Historic Places in 1995 and was extensively expanded in 2001.
