= North Hills Mall (North Richland Hills, Texas) =

- Location: North Richland Hills, Texas in Tarrant County, Texas, United States
- Coordinates: 32.82924°N 97.21834°W
- Address: 7624 Grapevine Highway
- Opened: September 12, 1979; 47 years ago
- Closed: 2004; 22 years ago (demolished early 2007)
- Owner: Burk Collins & Co
- Num. of stores: Space For 85 (0 Occupied)
- Num. of anchor tenants: 3 (0 Open, 3 Closed)
- Floor area: 558,000 sq ft (51,800 m^{2})
- Floors: 1
- Website: http://www.northhillsmall.com/ at the Wayback Machine (archived June 14, 2004)

North Hills Mall was a shopping mall on SH 26 in North Richland Hills, Texas, a suburb of Fort Worth, Texas, United States. It held its grand opening on 12 September 1979. The property premiered with department stores, Stripling and Cox, Sanger Harris, and Mervyn's serving as anchor tenants. It would be successful for the first 20 years of its existence.

== Demise ==
In November 1999, the mall was acquired by a new group of real estate investors who planned to turn it into "entertainment" hub in order to differentiate it from North East Mall's fashion focus. Plans included a Cinemark Theatre, an Olympic-sized ice rink, a 200-foot fountain, a man-made 3-acre lake, and indoor mobile transportation. However, obstacles such as continued construction on Interstate 820/Airport Freeway, a slow start to construction, and an ever-increasingly popular mall across the street caused the renovation to never materialize.

By the completion of the North East Mall's renovation, the mall was beginning to empty out with Stripling and Cox shuttering its North Hills Store in 2000. By the next year Foley's was gone, with the store relocating to a brand new location at the North East Mall.

The mall closed in October 2004 at about 20% occupancy with the exception of Mervyn's (which closed in 2006 as it left the retail market in Texas) and sat vacant until it was demolished in early 2007.

North Richland Hills built their new city hall on the former site.

== See also ==
- Dead mall
- North East Mall
