= Maple Hill Pavilion =

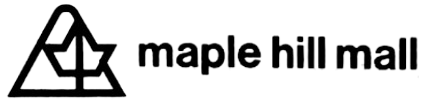
- Location: Kalamazoo, Michigan, United States
- Coordinates: 42.298°N 85.652°W
- Opened: Maple Hill Mall - 1971; Maple Hill Pavilion - 2004
- Developer: Forbes-Cohen (Maple Hill Mall); Kimco Realty Corp. (Maple Hill Pavillon)
- Manager: Devonshire
- Owner: Devonshire
- Num. of stores: Former mall - approx. 70; Pavilion - approx. 20
- Num. of anchor tenants: 8
- Floor area: Former mall - 64,162 sq ft (5,960.8 m^{2}); Pavilion - 296,093 sq ft (27,507.9 m^{2})
- Floors: 1
- Public transit: Metro Transit

Maple Hill Pavilion (formerly Maple Hill Mall) is a strip mall serving the city of Kalamazoo, Michigan, United States. Maple Hill Mall became a "dead mall" after several years of decline and the loss of several major tenants. The center has since been redeveloped as a strip mall called Maple Hill Pavilion, which features DSW Shoe Warehouse, Hobby Lobby, Marshalls, PetSmart, Pier One Imports, Office Max, Rooms Today and Target as its anchor stores. Maple Hill Pavilion is managed by ShopOne Centers REIT.

== History ==
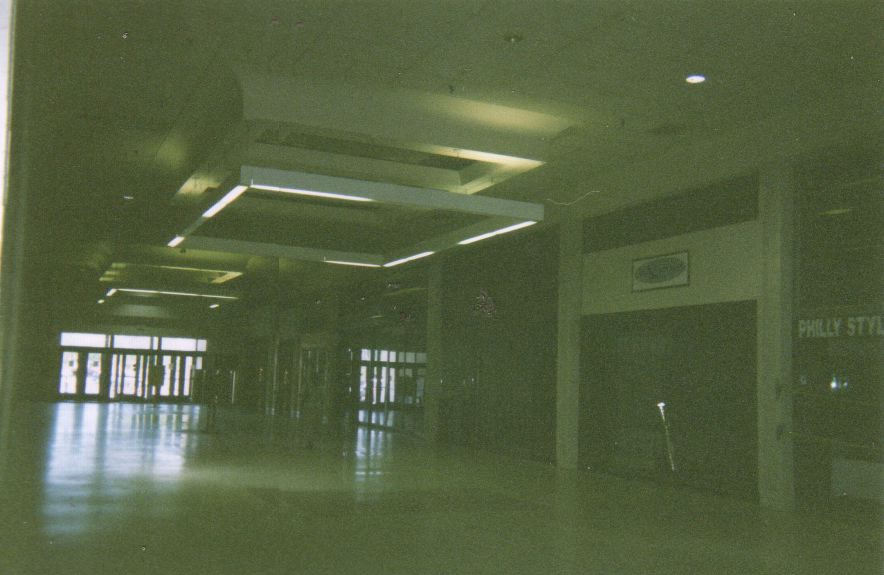
South wing of Maple Hill Mall, 2004

Maple Hill Mall opened in 1971 on West Main Street (M-43) on the northwestern side of Kalamazoo. Originally anchoring the mall were Montgomery Ward, as well as three local department stores: Grand Rapids-based Steketee's and Wurzburg's, and Kalamazoo-based Gilmore Brothers. A combination Turn Style/Jewel Food Stores was located next to Wurzburg's, but was detached from the mall. Wurzburg's closed in the 1970s and was converted to mall space. The west end of the building contained the High Wheeler Ice Cream Parlor, located near Meijer Square.

In the mid-1980s, Turn Style closed and was replaced with Meijer Square, a concept store of the Grand Rapids-based superstore chain Meijer, as well as the only Meijer store to be located in an enclosed mall. Meijer Square was strictly a discount department store, lacking the full-line grocery section normally found at Meijer stores.

By the early 1990s, Meijer relocated to West Main and 9th Street. The old Meijer Square location was demolished and replaced with Target.

Gilmore Brothers closed in 1995. The former Gilmore Brothers became mall space. Montgomery Ward and Steketee's closed in 2000 and 2003, respectively. Without the draw of its anchor stores, the mall lost customer traffic and many inline tenants.

Several big-box tenants were opened in the late 1990s and early 2000s to fill the increasing number of vacancies, including Office Max and Marshalls. Kimco Realty acquired the mall in 2003, with plans for renovation. Value City Furniture and Hobby Lobby opened in 2004, each taking half of the former Montgomery Ward. Immediately prior to demolition, only four inline tenants remained - GNC, Dollar Tree, Regis Hairstylists, and Glamour Nails (a nail salon).

== Maple Hill Pavilion ==
Kimco began demolition on the mall in the summer of 2004. The mall's anchor stores were all left standing, as was a Secretary of State office next to Target. After demolition was complete, a new strip mall called Maple Hill Pavilion was built, connecting the remaining spaces. GNC, Regis, Dollar Tree, and Glamour Nails all opened new locations in the strip. Since the opening of the strip mall, PetSmart, Rue 21, Pier One Imports, GameStop and DSW Shoe Warehouse have also opened. In 2006, the Value City Furniture store was renamed Rooms Today. It was again named Value City Furniture.

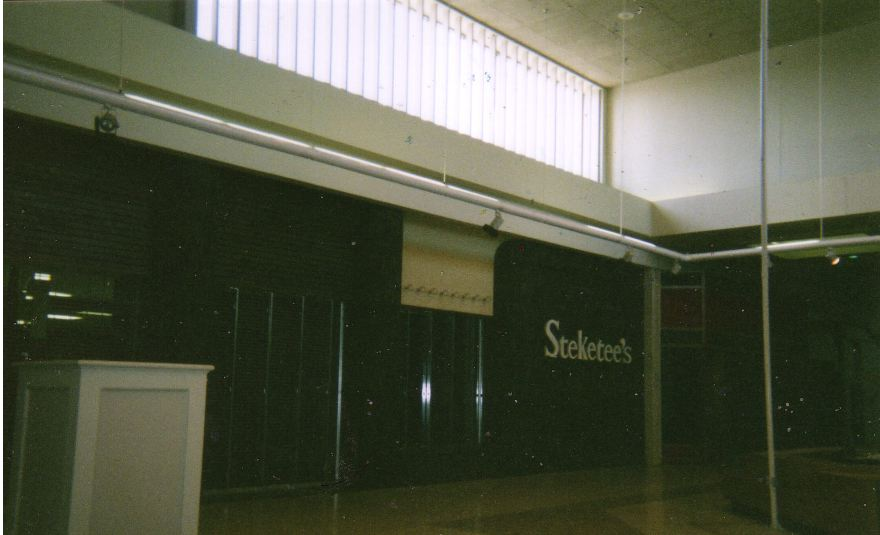
Former Steketee's at Maple Hill Mall, 2004
