= Schreiner's =

Schreiner's, also known as Charles Schreiner & Company, was a department store located in downtown Kerrville, Texas, operated by Fort Worth-based Dunlaps.

== History ==
In 1858, Charles Schreiner, Sr., a French immigrant and former Texas Ranger, purchased a small general store at Camp Verde, which was a military post 15 miles south of Kerrville. Schreiner contracted with the government to supply the soldiers with beef and other supplies. After fighting in the Civil War, he moved to Kerrville, where he and an associate opened a store in 1869 (parts of the original wooden store still exist behind the current stone building). He bought out his partner in 1879, and expanded his business to include banking, ranching, and marketing wool and mohair. Schreiner's was the first business in America to value mohair. The bank got so much business by 1893, Charles had to build a separate building for it. One of his major contributions to the community was the founding of the Schreiner Institute (Now Schreiner University) in Kerrville in 1917. Dunlaps acquired the store in 1991 and pledged to operate it just the way it was and under the same name in the same building.

Dunlaps, unable to secure financing for a loan it had made, declared bankruptcy and was dissolved by the end of 2007. All of its remaining stores closed before the end of the year. Schreiner's closed its doors for the last time on September 23, 2007. The building has since reopened under the same name and features a number of smaller retail stores and boutiques.

== See also ==
- Capt. Charles Schreiner Mansion

== Sources ==
- Biography of Charles Schreiner
- Photo of Schreiner's on Flickr
- Schreiner University Homepage
- The Daily Times: Schreiner's closes its doors for good
