= De-malling =

De-malling is the process in which a developer eliminates the most common characteristics of a shopping mall, which usually has a large enclosed space with smaller stores, typically surrounded by department stores as anchor tenants. Often this is done by closing off the interior spaces of a shopping mall and turning the facility into an open air center, in which the remaining stores are all accessed from the outside. Alternatively, defunct anchor spaces are repurposed for such uses as private or governmental offices or medical purposes, or converted into residential uses.

Though the idea dates back to the early part of the 21st century, in North America, the retail apocalypse has heavily impacted second-tier malls and some have closed, many of which have become "dead malls". While the decline in large department stores has been the mist visible evidence of the phenomenon -- 9,000 stores closed in 2019 alone -- the causes have ranged from the rise of online shopping, the increase in big box superstores, the shift to a service economy and to increasing variations in socioeconomic status. In response, property owners have converted the inward-facing shopping mall that has a shared interior walkway connection its stores, by adding entertainment and experiential features, added big-box stores as anchors, or converted to other specialized shopping center formats such as power centers, lifestyle centers and factory outlet centers.

== History ==
In 1995, the Mall at Fashion Plaza in North Brunswick, New Jersey, turned from an enclosed mall into a larger power center format that added 60,000 square feet (5,600 m^{2}) of space.

A 1999 article in the Los Angeles Times cited weaker malls being demalled in the face of intense competition from stronger centers, citing the example of the Sherman Oaks Galleria declining in competition with stronger anchors at Sherman Oaks Fashion Square, with the Sherman Oaks Galleria being shifted to include 600,000 square feet (56,000 m^{2}) of office space and a far smaller share of traditional retail. Plaza Pasadena, a former shopping mall was demolished and replaced with Paseo Colorado, which included shopping, restaurants and 400 apartment units.

The phenomenon spread to Paramus, New Jersey, which has been one of the largest retail communities in the United States, generating more than $6 billion in annual retail sales, more than any other ZIP Code in the United States. With four major regional shopping malls, the Fashion Center on Route 17 had effectively become a dead mall as retailers left and Lord & Taylor was left as its only anchor store. By 2009, the mall become the first in North Jersey to use de-malling as a strategy, closing off the interior and focusing on larger retailers accessible only from the exterior.

A 2013 analysis in Revista Lusófona de Arquitectura e Educação documented cases of dead and dying malls in Italy being repurposed for such uses as health care. A 2019 study in the journal Cities found the phenomenon of declining malls being impacted by decline found de-malling occurring in a study of 55 shopping malls in Lisbon, mirroring patterns seen in North America.

The Westshore Mall in Holland, Michigan, originally constructed in 1988 as the area's only enclosed mall, was more than half empty by 2014 and underwent a de-malling that started in 2015 and turned the complex into an outdoor shopping mall renamed as The Shops at Westshore with a quarter of the old mall being demolished.

The International Council of Shopping Centers, the industry's largest organization in North America, cited the example of the Monmouth Mall, which had declined in the decades after its construction in the 1960s as a result of changing shopping preferences. Owner Kushner Companies invested $500 million in a redevelopment project that turned the mall into an open-air center, eliminated 200,000 square feet (19,000 m^{2}) of space, eliminated two former anchors and added 1,000 residential units and 80,000 square feet (7,400 m^{2}) of medical uses.
