= Downtown Florence Historic District (Florence, Colorado) =

Historic district in Colorado, United States

- U.S. National Register of Historic Places
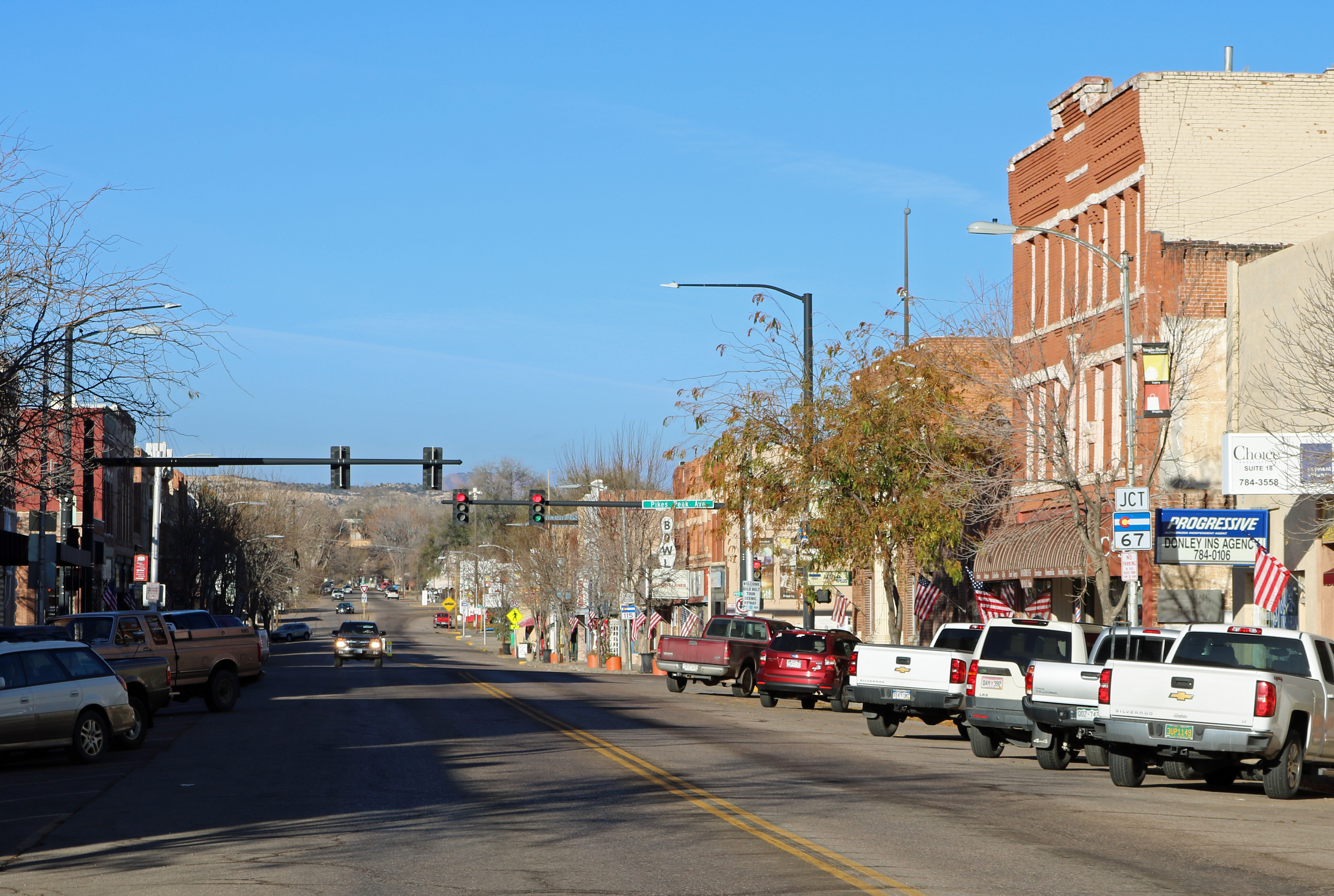
- Location: Florence, Colorado
- Coordinates: 38°23′24″N 105°07′04″W
- Area: 18.6 acres (7.5 ha)
- NRHP reference No.: 100001309
- Added to NRHP: July 14, 2017

The Downtown Florence Historic District in Florence, Colorado was listed on the National Register of Historic Places in 2017.

A walking tour through the historic district includes the Florence Post Office where a WPA-era mural “Antelope Watering Hole” can be seen, and the McCandless Cabin, the oldest continually occupied house in Florence.

The district is roughly bounded by Main St., Santa Fe & Petroleum Aves. between W. 2nd & Railroad Sts.

The listing included 56 contributing buildings, 21 non-contributing ones, and a non-contributing structure.
