= Rogers Department Store =

- U.S. National Register of Historic Places
- Alabama Register of Landmarks and Heritage
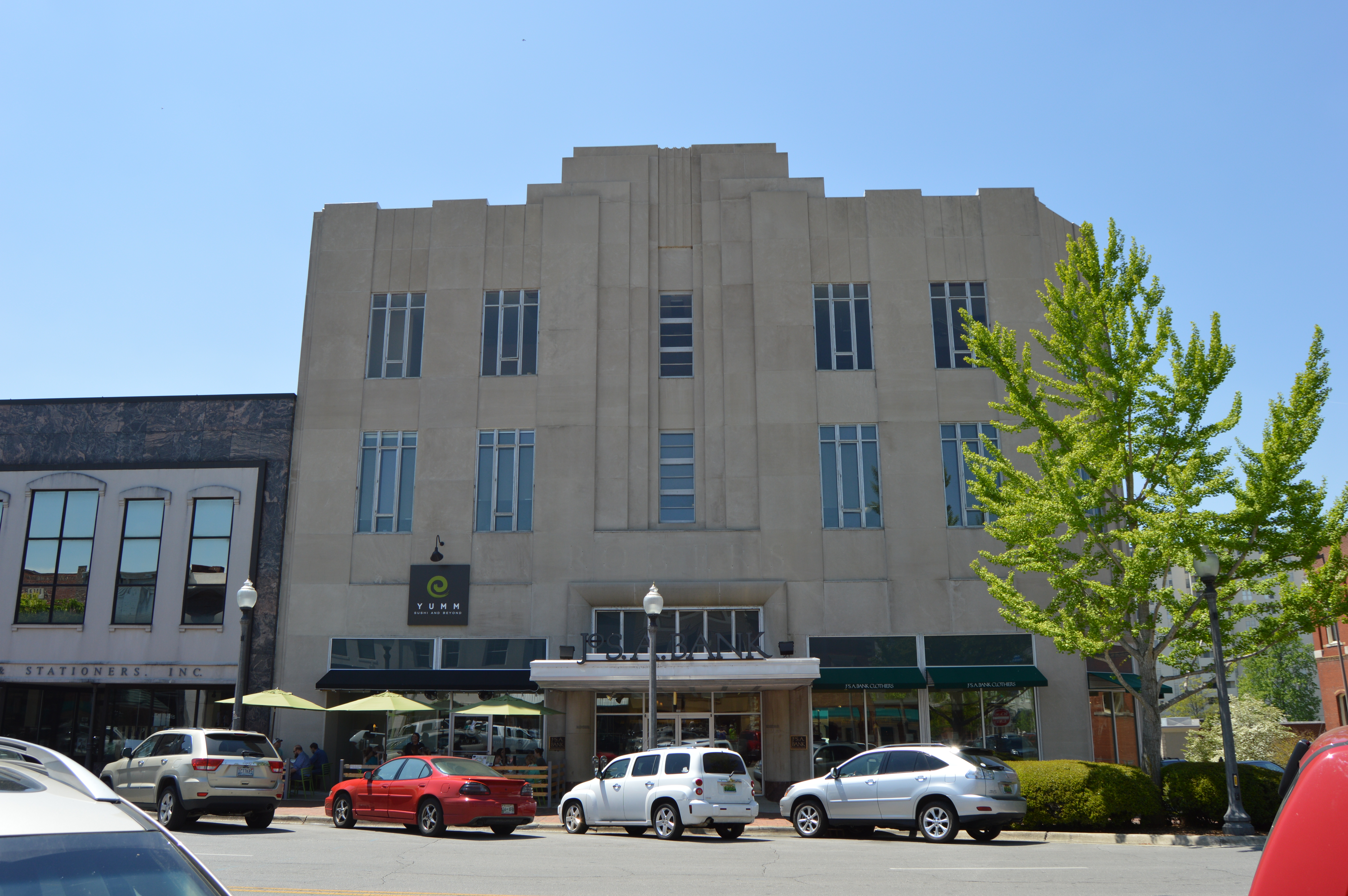
- The building in April 2014

- Location within Alabama Location within the United States
- Location: 117 N. Court St., Florence, Alabama
- Coordinates: 34°48′3″N 87°40′36″W
- Area: less than one acre
- Built: 1910
- Architect: Hulsey & Hall
- Architectural style: Art Deco
- NRHP reference No.: 98001025

Significant dates
- Added to NRHP: August 14, 1998
- Designated ARLH: August 25, 1994

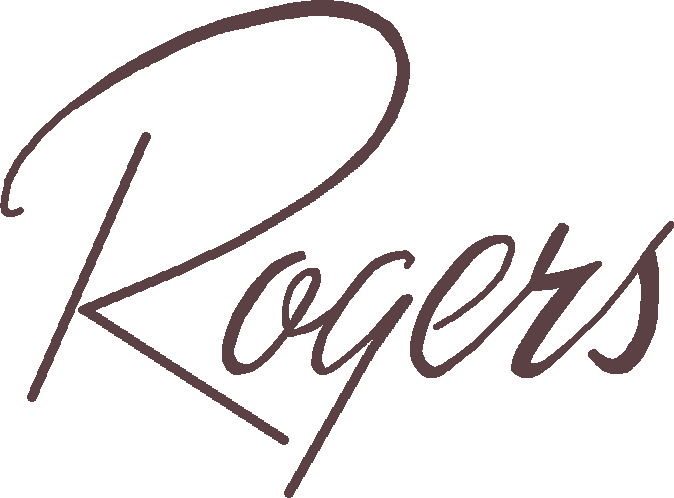
Rogers log0

Rogers Department Store was a department store chain based in Florence, Alabama. Founded in 1894, the company grew to include locations across the Tennessee Valley. The original building, constructed in 1910, was listed on the Alabama Register of Landmarks and Heritage in 1994 and the National Register of Historic Places in 1998.

== History ==
Benjamin A. Rogers and his sons came to Florence in 1894 during a boom in the local economy driven by the construction of a canal to bypass the Muscle Shoals on the Tennessee River. The family erected a two-story frame building to house a department store. The store was one of the first in the area to clearly mark prices on items, rather than leaving the purchase up to negotiation.

Benjamin Rogers died in 1902, and the store burned in 1910, leaving the Rogers sons to rebuild. They erected the current two-story building, which was expanded to three stories and partially rebuilt after a fire in 1946. Rogers opened other locations, including in Muscle Shoals, Decatur, and Athens. The company remained in the family until 1998, when it was sold to The Dunlap Company, who closed the downtown Florence location in 2001. The store in Athens was closed in 1996, the Decatur store in 2006, and Muscle Shoals location (at Southgate Mall) was closed in 2007. As of 2013, the Florence building is occupied by an Asian fusion restaurant, Jos. A. Bank, and Alabama Outdoors on the ground floor, while the Martin Supply Company offices occupy the upper floors.

== Architecture ==
The building is a three-story Art Deco structure, with over 65,500 square feet (6,100 sq. m) of interior space. It was originally constructed of solid brick, with some concrete block and poured reinforced concrete walls dating from the late 1940s expansion and post-fire restoration. The rear of the building, separated from a parking garage by a narrow alley, retains its original brick, with evidence of arched window openings on the two lower floors, along with twin chimneys.

The front and side façades are covered in beige limestone, with decorative carved ram's heads on the chamfered corner and on the side of the building. There are two entrances at the front and side, and large aluminum-framed display windows line the front. A row of polished pink granite lines the base of the building. The building's Art Deco character is derived from the two upper floors. Each bay is recessed, and contains three-part windows with a central casement surrounded by fixed panels. Projecting limestone panels between the bays rise slightly above the parapet line, further visually separated by scored panels above the third-floor windows. In the center of the front façade and twice on the side, a further recessed bay is flanked by panels that project further above the roofline.

The first and third floors feature mezzanines. The store was one of the first in North Alabama to have elevators, along with central air conditioning and heat.

The building sits across Mobile Street from Southall Drugs, also listed on the National Register.
