= Dunlaps =

Defunct department store chain

The Dunlap Company
- Type: Department store
- Industry: Retail
- Founded: 1890, Wagoner, Oklahoma
- Defunct: 2007
- Fate: Liquidation
- Headquarters: Fort Worth, Texas
- Products: Clothing, footwear, jewelry, beauty products, and housewares.

Dunlaps, based in Fort Worth, Texas, USA, was a family-owned chain of department stores in the central and southern United States catering to most classes depending on the location. The chain operated under the trade names of Dunlaps, Stripling & Cox, MM Cohn, Rogers, Clark's, Schreiner's of Kerrville, Hieronimus, Kerr's, Kline's, The White House, and Gabriel's. The company operated 38 stores in eight states. Due to stiff competition from larger retailers and lawsuits from suppliers, Dunlaps closed its last locations after liquidation sales in mid-2007.

== History ==
The Dunlap Company was founded as a small general store in about 1890 by H.G. Dunlap in Wagoner, Oklahoma (then Indian territory) during the great Land Rush. After several years of operation, Dunlap consolidated his store with the Dunlap Brothers store, which his sons had established in nearby Coweta, Oklahoma. By 1921, the Dunlap Brothers had expanded to 20 stores throughout eastern Oklahoma. Eventually, the Dunlap family decided to retire, close the stores and move to California to open a new group of stores.

Retha R. Martin, who had come to work for the Dunlaps in 1916, had risen to the position of manager of the last remaining store. He was asked to join the partnership with a 40% interest. The plan was for Martin to close out the store in Eufaula, Oklahoma and move to California to run the new company. However, business was so good in Eufaula that year, it was agreed that Martin should stay behind. The store prospered and expanded under his leadership.

In 1939, seeing the prosperity of the booming ranch and oil country of West Texas, Martin began acquiring stores in that area. By 1943, there were fourteen stores located primarily in West Texas and New Mexico, and Martin moved the company headquarters to Lubbock, Texas.

Some stores acquired by Dunlaps were Goldstein-Migel of Waco, TX in 1976, The White House of Beaumont, TX in 1986, MM Cohn of Little Rock, Ar in 1989, Porteous of Portland, Me in 1992, and Steketee's of Grand Rapids, Mi in 1991.

After a certain point, the company stopped re-branding its acquired stores, keeping local traditions alive and even operating single location stores. Though keeping many names around, other stores like Heironimus, Steketee's, Katz, McClurkans, and Goldstein-Migel were closed or converted to Dunlaps over time due to long distance issues or losses of lease. Despite their well-known brands, the stores had little staying power in the competitive marketplace.

In June 2007, it was announced that Dunlaps and all its accompanying stores would be going out of business, thus ending one of the last small regional department store chains left in the country. They cited the cause as being unable to get financing for a loan to keep the company afloat. Within months, all the stores were liquidated and closed.

== List of stores owned by Dunlaps ==
- Clark's - Lufkin, Texas
- Dunlap's - Amarillo, Texas, Big Spring, Texas, Midland, Texas, Odessa, Texas, Bullhead City, Arizona, Lake Havasu City, Arizona, Liberal, Kansas, Victoria, Texas, Kermit, Texas, Stephenville, Texas, and Lubbock, Texas
- MM Cohn - Little Rock, Arkansas, Memphis, Tennessee
- Eiband's - Galveston, Texas
- Gabriel's - Plainview, Texas
- Goldstein - Migel - Waco, Texas
- Heironimus - Roanoke and Lynchburg, Virginia
- Klines - Dodge City, Kansas, Hays, Kansas, and Salina, Kansas
- Lintz - Brady, Texas
- McClurkan's - Wichita Falls, Texas
- Pegues Hutchinson, Kansas
- Porteous - Maine
- Hirsch's Department Store St. Joseph, Missouri
- Rogers - Florence, Muscle Shoals, and Decatur, Alabama
- Russel's - Denton, Texas
- Schreiner's - Kerrville, Texas
- Steketee's - Downtown Grand Rapids, Michigan, Eastbrook Mall, Grand Rapids, Michigan, Kalamazoo, Michigan, Holland, Michigan, Grand Haven, Michigan and Muskegon, Michigan
- Stripling & Cox - Fort Worth, Texas
- The White House - Beaumont, Texas, El Paso, Lake Charles, LA
