= Mansfield Tyler =

Mansfield Tyler (1826–1904) was a religious and political leader in Alabama. He helped found schools and churches and served in the Alabama House of Representatives in 1870.

== Early life ==
Mansfield was enslaved when young. His first wife Phyllis and he had six children before she died. As a Baptist, he led an African American congregation in Lowndesboro, Alabama. He was elected to the Alabama House of Representatives in 1870 and served one term in office. He chaired Selma University's board of trustees which later bestowed an honorary degree on him.

== Legacy ==
In 2018 he was inducted into the Alabama Men's Hall of Fame. The Lowndesboro School, which he helped establish, was added to the National Register of Historic Places in 2025. It is now a museum and technology center.

== See also ==
- Lowndesboro Historic District
- African American officeholders from the end of the Civil War until before 1900
- National Register of Historic Places listings in Lowndes County, Alabama
