= National Register of Historic Places listings in Lowndes County, Alabama =

Location of Lowndes County in Alabama

This is a list of the National Register of Historic Places listings in Lowndes County, Alabama.

This is intended to be a complete list of the properties and districts on the National Register of Historic Places in Lowndes County, Alabama, United States. Latitude and longitude coordinates are provided for many National Register properties and districts; these locations may be seen together in an online map.

There are seven properties and districts listed on the National Register in the county.

This National Park Service list is complete through NPS recent listings posted June 6, 2026.

	Name on the Register	Image	Date listed	Location	City or town	Description
1	Calhoun School Principal's House	Calhoun School Principal's House	March 26, 1976 (#76000340)	County Road 33; 32°03′28″N 86°32′58″W	Letohatchee	Founded in 1892, the Calhoun Colored School was a private boarding and day school developed according to the "Hampton-Tuskegee Model". The principal's house on County Route 33 is the last remaining structure from the original school.
2	Campsite 2: Rosie Steele Property		November 6, 2023 (#100009549)	5892-5876 Highway 80 W 32°16′04″N 86°42′23″W	White Hall vicinity	
3	Campsite 3: The Gardner Farm		July 12, 2023 (#100009120)	2342 Frederick Douglass Rd. 32°15′56″N 86°32′06″W	Lowndesboro vicinity	
4	Lowndes County Courthouse	Lowndes County Courthouse	June 24, 1971 (#71000100)	Washington St. 32°11′01″N 86°34′47″W	Hayneville	
5	Lowndesboro Historic District	Lowndesboro Historic District	December 12, 1973 (#73000356)	North of U.S. Route 80; 32°17′14″N 86°36′11″W	Lowndesboro	The Lowndesboro Historic District covers 1,800 acres, spread over the entire town, and contains 20 contributing properties, including Meadowlawn Plantation (pictured). Architectural styles include the Gothic Revival, Greek Revival, and other Victorian styles.
6	Ramah Baptist Church		June 17, 2026 (#100013132)	512 Calhoun Cut-off Road; 32°03′05″N 86°33′31″W	Letohatchee vicinity	
7	James Spullock Williamson House	James Spullock Williamson House	January 5, 1989 (#88003123)	U.S. Route 31; 32°01′29″N 86°27′06″W	Sandy Ridge	Greek Revival-style plantation home built in 1850. Also known as "Merry Oaks Farm".

== See also ==
- List of National Historic Landmarks in Alabama
- National Register of Historic Places listings in Alabama
