= Lowndes Academy =

Segregation academy in Alabama

Location
- 215 S Broad St; Lowndesboro, Alabama 36752; United States; 32°16′34″N 86°36′47″W

Information
- Type: Private, Co-educational
- Headmaster: Barry Mohun
- Grades: K-12
- Enrollment: 235 (2016)
- Colors: Red and white
- Mascot: Rebels
- Website: www.lowndesacademy.org

Lowndes Academy is an independent school in Lowndesboro, Alabama.

== History ==
Lowndes Academy was founded in 1966 as a segregation academy. The school was established by white parents who were boycotting racially integrated public schools in Hayneville. In a 1968 interview, headmaster S. M. Champion said that he "didn't know" if the school would admit a qualified black student.

In the school's early days, the school relied on revenue from football games to fund school operations.

== Accreditation ==
Lowndes Academy is accredited by the Alabama Independent School Association.

== Demographics ==
Of 241 non-prekindergarten students enrolled in the 2009–2010 school year, 239 were white and 2 were black. The 2010 demographic profile of Lowndes County, where the school is located, showed the population as 25.5% white and 73.8% black.
