= Letohatchee, Alabama =

Unincorporated community in Alabama, United States

- Unincorporated community
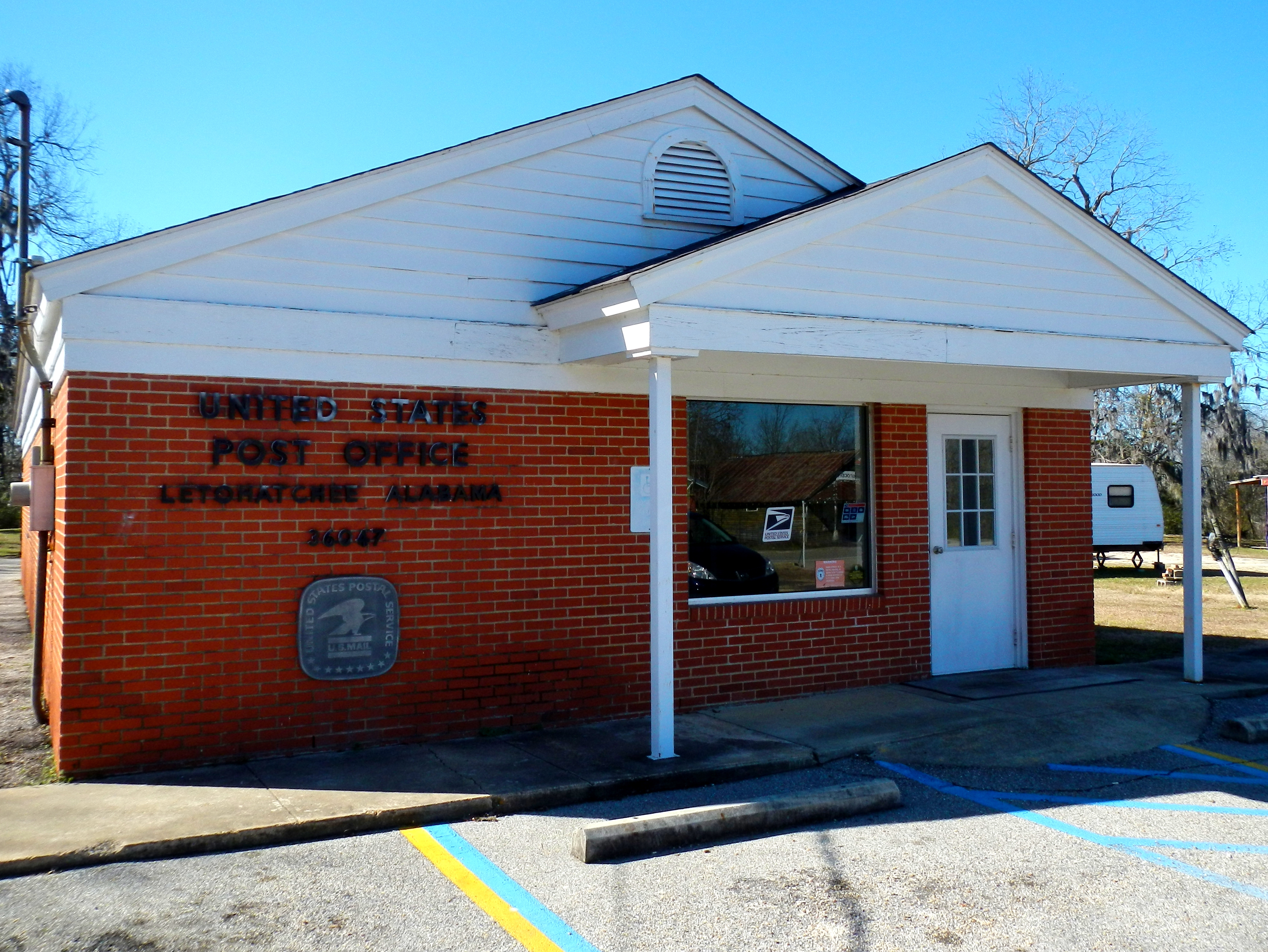
- Letohatchee Post Office

- Location within Alabama Location within the United States
- Coordinates: 32°07′47″N 86°29′09″W
- Country: United States
- State: Alabama
- County: Lowndes
- Elevation: 322 ft (98 m)
- Time zone: UTC-6 (Central (CST))
  - Summer (DST): UTC-5 (CDT)
- Area code: 334
- GNIS feature ID: 121509

Letohatchee is an unincorporated community in Lowndes County, Alabama, United States. It has a very small population and four businesses. The community is part of the Montgomery Metropolitan Statistical Area.

In 1900 and 1917, whites committed a total of seven lynchings of blacks, half of the total 14 in Lowndes County from 1877 to 1950. In 1900 they killed all four members of the Jim Cross family.

== Location ==
Letohatchee is located just south of Montgomery in Lowndes County. In the 21st century, much of Letohatchee is uninhabited, with large pastures and uncut woods. Its area is estimated at 18 miles across.

This was an area of extensive cotton cultivation into the early decades of the 20th century, and Lowndes County was majority black. Whites' efforts to maintain white supremacy raised tensions in the black-majority county. The Democrat-dominated legislature disenfranchised most blacks and many poor whites by provisions of a new constitution in 1901.

Whites also resorted to racial terrorism in the form of lynchings. In 1900 a mob killed a black man accused of killing a white man. When local black resident Jim Cross objected, he was killed, too, at his house; whites then shot and killed his wife, son and daughter. In 1917 William Powell and his brother (recorded as Samuel or Jesse) were both lynched for alleged insolence to a white farmer on the road. No whites were prosecuted in these cases. On July 31, 2016, a historical marker was erected by the Equal Justice Initiative to commemorate these extrajudicial executions.

== Demographics ==
Historical population
Census	Pop.	Note	%±
1880	73		—
1890	112		53.4%
U.S. Decennial Census

Letohatchee was listed on the 1880 and 1890 U.S. Census as a separate community; these were the only years when it was listed separately. It is now included in Montgomery.

The zip code for Letohatchee is 36047 and the population for the entire code (of which Letohatchee is a part) was 1,396 as of the 2010 U.S. Census. Of that, it is 71% black and 29% white (with less than 1% for other races).

== Industry ==
Letohatchee has two industrial plants, four convenience stores and one restaurant/cattle yard and a post office. The American Colloid Company operates a Bentonite clay mining operation here.

== Education ==
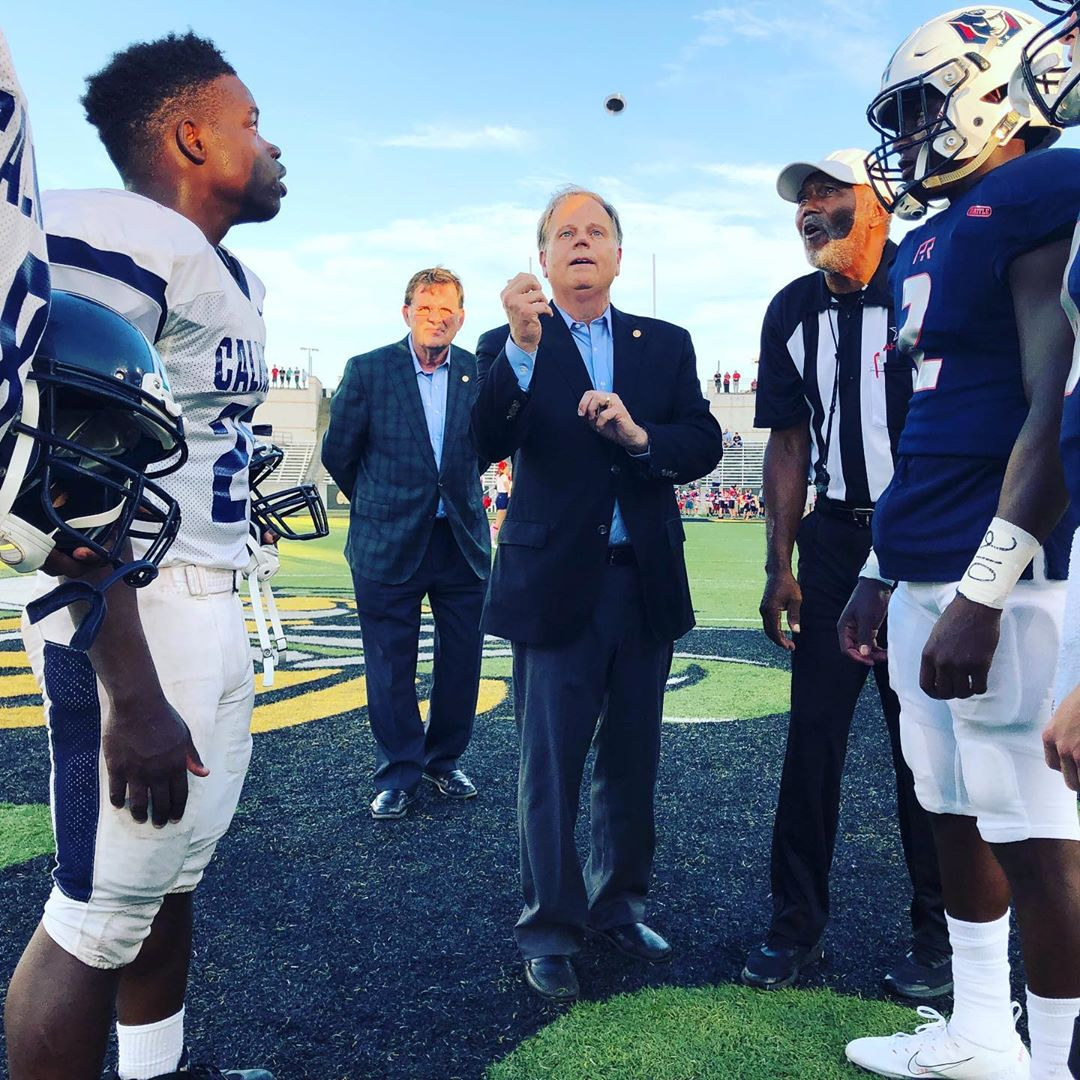
Senator Doug Jones participating in a coin toss during a Calhoun High School football game in 2019.

Calhoun High School is the secondary school for the community.

== Notable people ==
- JD Davison - Point Guard Boston Celtics

== Gallery ==
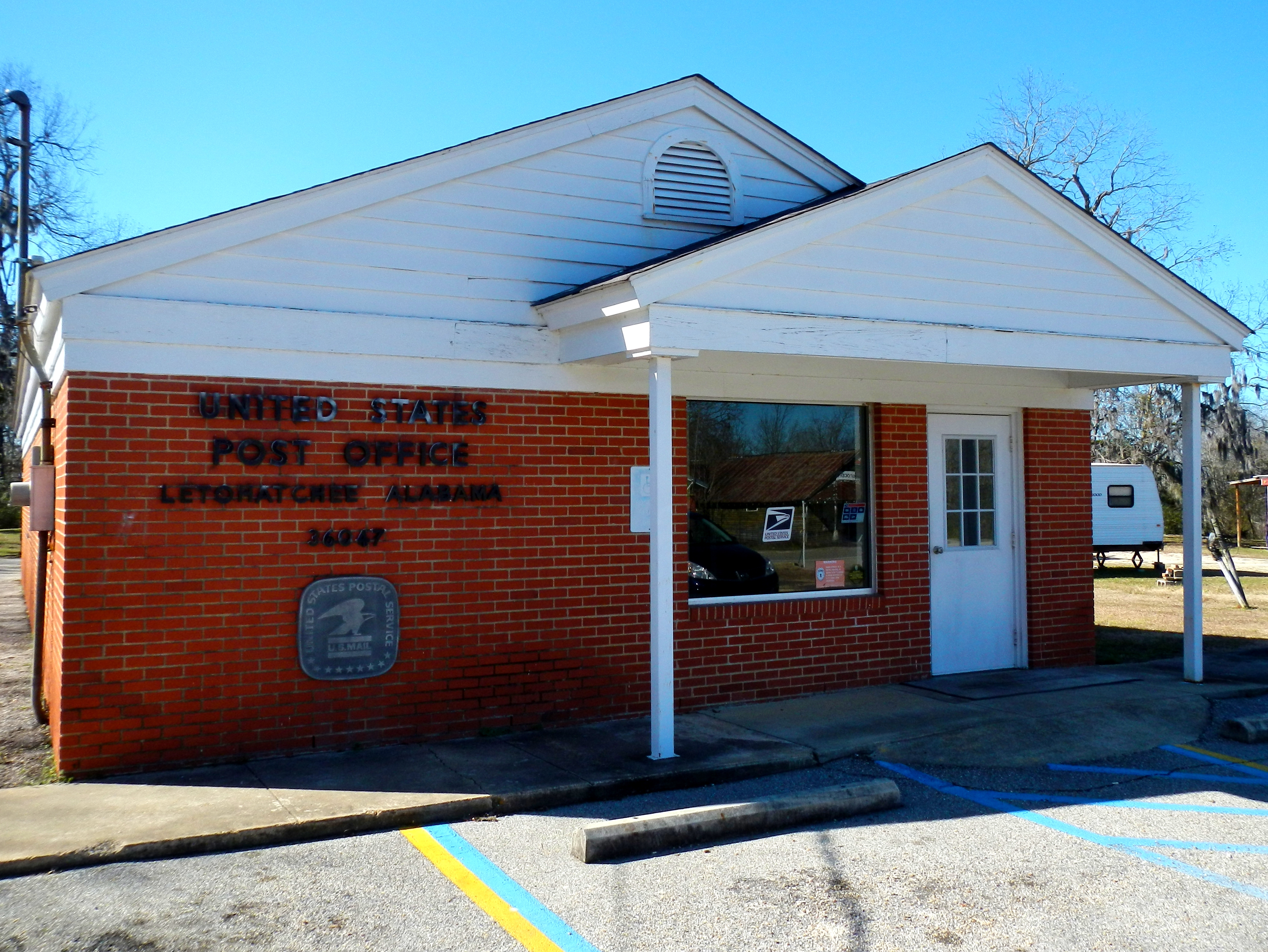
Letohatchee Post Office (ZIP Code: 36047

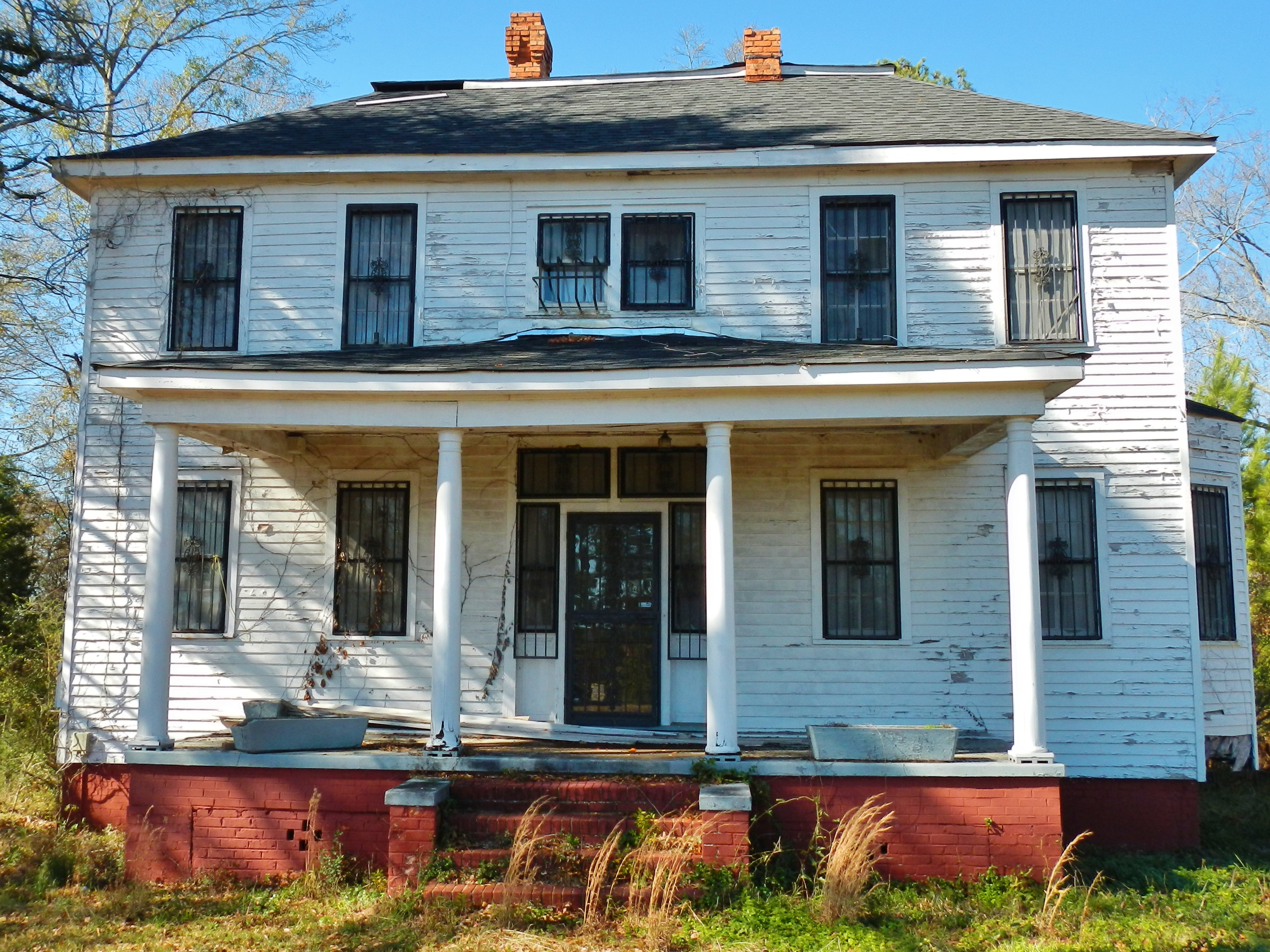
Calhoun Colored School (1892-1945) was located near Letohatchee. The principal's house, the only surviving original building, was placed on the National Register of Historic Places on March 26, 1976.

== See also ==
- List of unincorporated communities in Alabama
