= Dicksonia Plantation =

Dicksonia
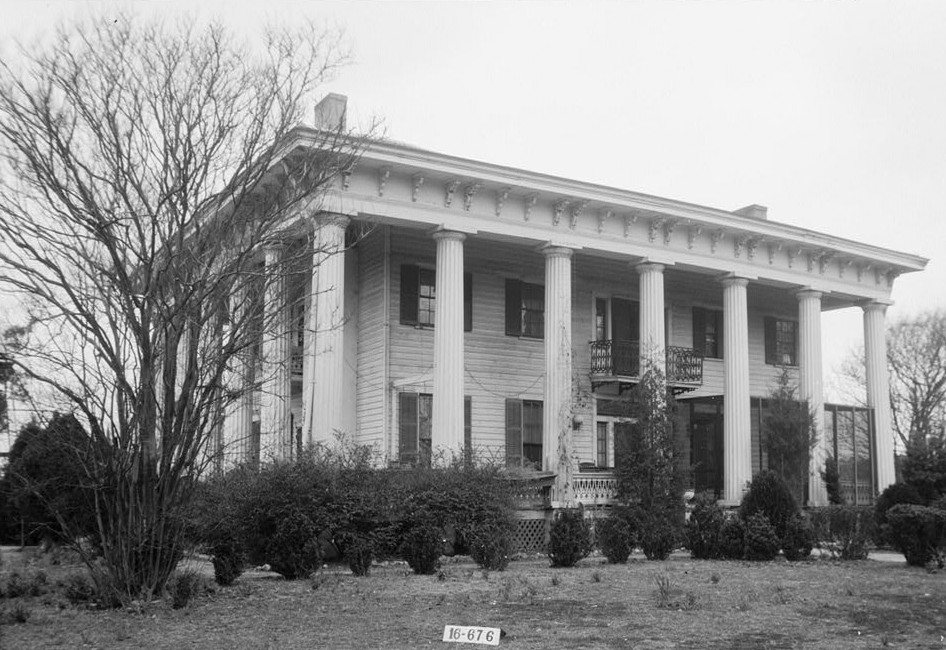
- Dicksonia in 1934.

- Location within Alabama
- 32.25798°N 86.60869°W
- Location: Lowndes County, Alabama

History
- Built: 1830-1856, 1940
- Built for: David White, Wiley Turner, Robert Dickson

Site notes
- Architectural style: Greek Revival with Italianate influences
- Governing body: Private

Dicksonia, also known as the Turner-Dickson House, was a historic plantation house just south of Lowndesboro, Alabama, United States. Dating back to 1830, it was destroyed by fire twice. The house was recorded by the Historic American Buildings Survey in 1934 and the ruins were later featured in the 1993 book Silent in the Land. For the May 1999 issue of Vanity Fair magazine, Annie Leibovitz did a photo shoot of Natalie Portman at the ruins on February 7, 1999.

== Construction and history ==
Dicksonia was originally a two-story house with a small one-story portico in front, built in 1830 by David White. But, in 1856, the house was purchased by Wiley Turner, who hired an architect to remodel the house into a Greek Revival mansion, very similar in appearance to nearby Meadowlawn. The front porch was removed and a monumental two-story portico extending around two sides of the house was added, supported by twelve fluted Doric columns. Elaborate cornice brackets, reflecting an Italianate influence, met at the roof line. The architecture of the house was also noted to show a Mississippi influence. Banisters of intricate design framed the porticoes. The front door had sidelights and an overhead transom. The door upstairs, also with sidelights, opened onto a wrought iron balcony directly over the front door. A side balcony of wooden banisters adorned the upstairs on the west side of the house. A central hall ran the length of the house, with a staircase leading to the second floor. Sometime before 1900, the separate kitchen was added to the house proper. Water was supplied by a windmill at this time.

Shem Arthur Tyson and his wife Mary (Toler) Tyson bought the house and land, known as the "Turner Home Track," from the Wiley Turner family. On November 29, 1901, the house and 400 acres (1.6 km^{2}) of land was sold to Robert Stiles Dickson, who named the mansion Dicksonia.

== Destruction ==
The first Dicksonia, built of wood, burned in 1939. It was replaced by a cast-concrete and steel replica in 1940. The rebuilt house had the same floor-plan as the first, with one difference. This time the monumental portico was rebuilt only across the front, instead of two sides of the house, due to the high cost of producing monumental Doric columns in concrete at the time. Although intended to be fireproof, the second incarnation of Dicksonia burned in 1964. This time the family could not rebuild it, due to extreme heat damage to the foundation. The empty shell and columns were left as a picturesque ivy-covered ruin, on private property without public access.

== Recent Events ==
The property is now available to the public on a limited basis. The current owner, Dorothy Dickson Skipper, has made significant improvements to the grounds and visibility of the building proper. Dicksonia Plantation is being advertised as a historical rental venue at Dorothy Skipper Rental, LLC on Facebook, with current photos. In 2015 a beautiful family wedding was held in front of the building, and numerous photo shoots have taken place since the improvements.

Historic American Buildings Survey photos taken in 1934
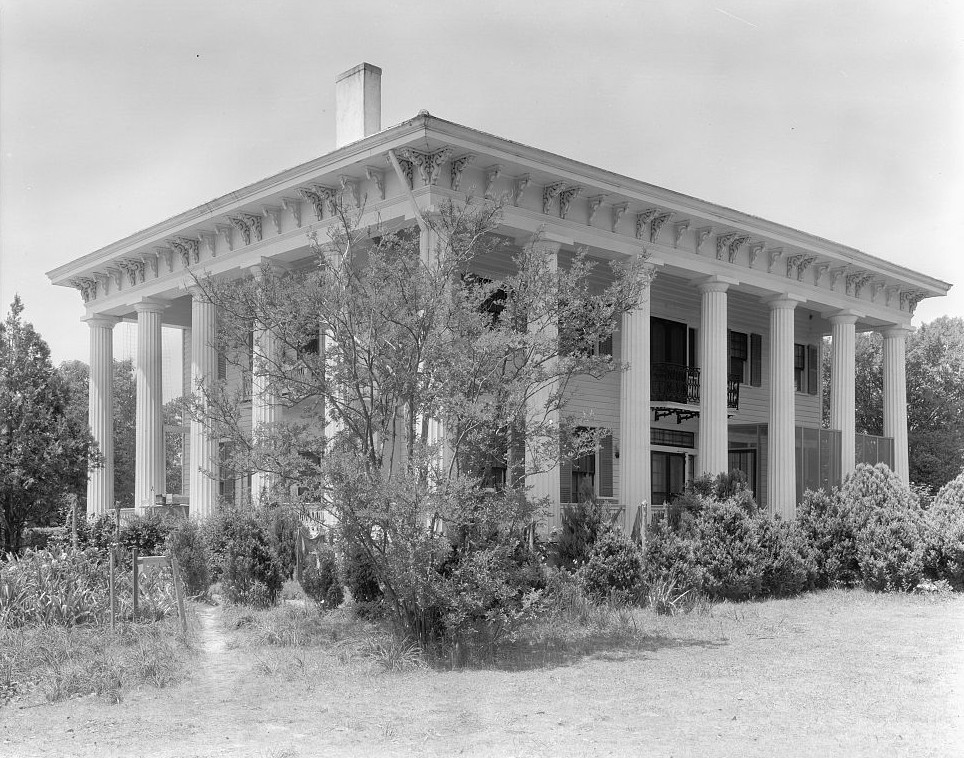
HABS Front and side view.

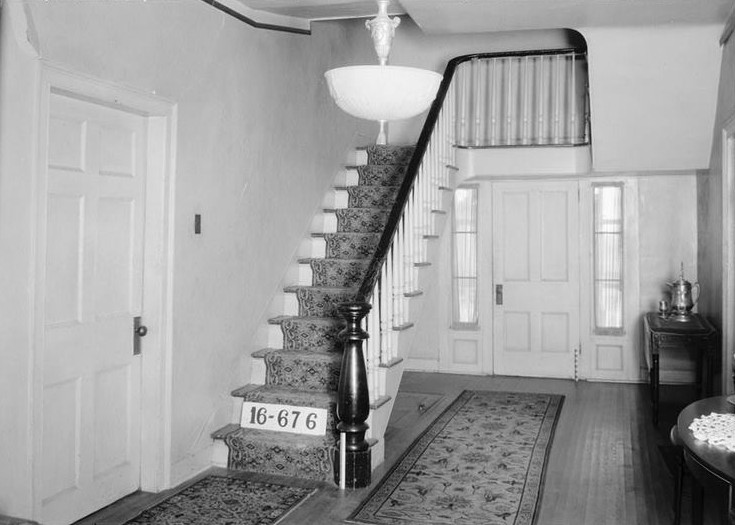
Hallway

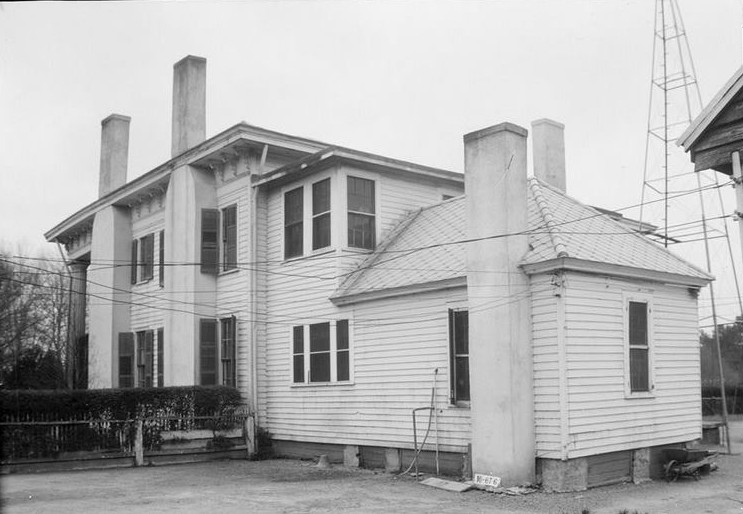
Rear View.
