= Lowndesboro Historic District =

Historic district in Alabama, United States

- Lowndesboro
- U.S. National Register of Historic Places
- U.S. Historic district
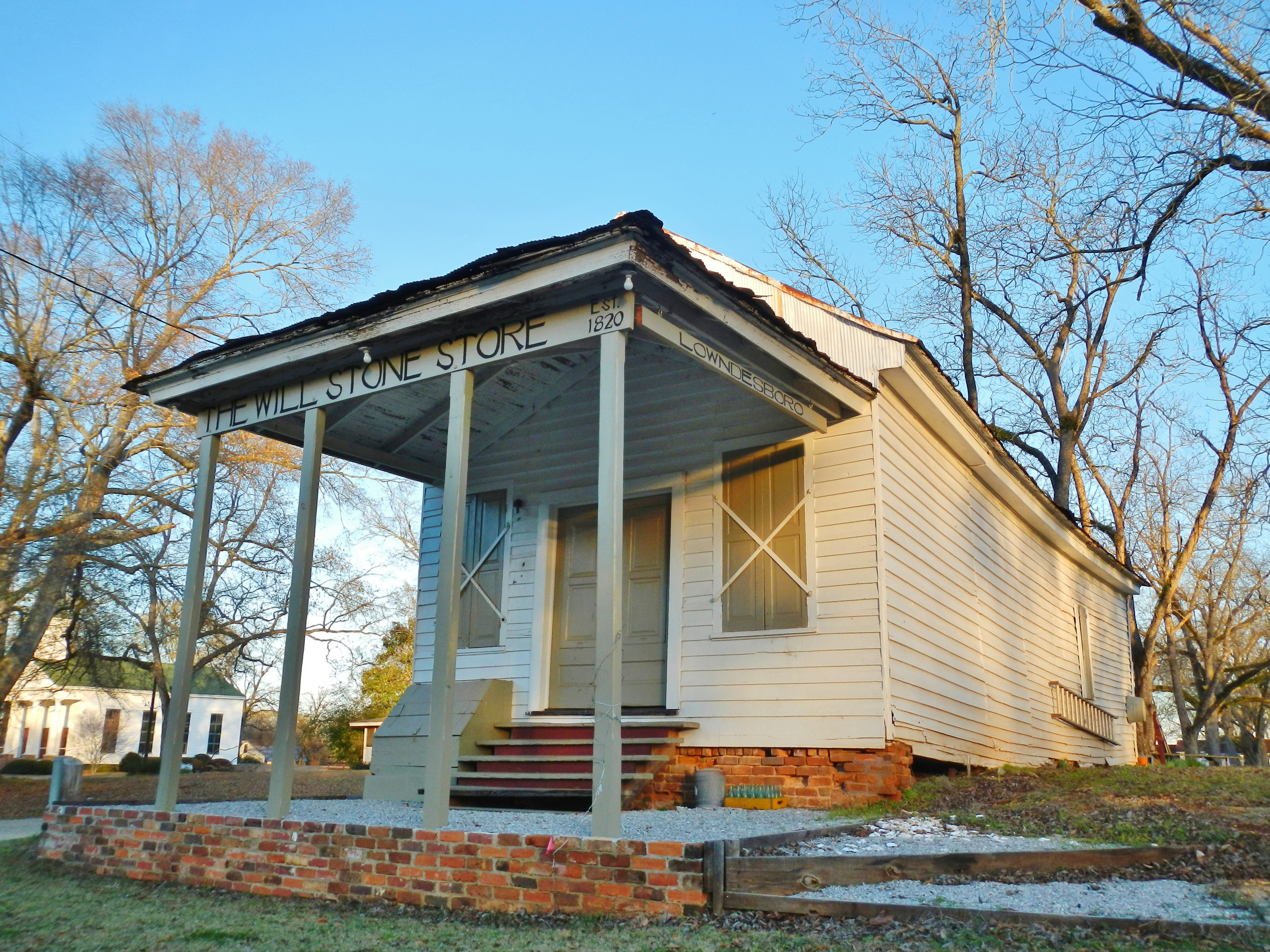
- The Will Stone Store, (Est. 1820), one of the contributing properties in the district

- Location within Alabama Location within the United States
- Location: N of U.S. 80, Lowndesboro, Alabama
- Coordinates: 32°17′14″N 86°36′11″W
- Area: 1,800 acres (730 ha)
- Architectural style: Greek Revival, Gothic Revival, Victorian
- NRHP reference No.: 73000356
- Added to NRHP: December 12, 1973

The Lowndesboro Historic District is a historic district in Lowndesboro, Alabama, United States. It was placed on the National Register of Historic Places on December 12, 1973. The district covers 1,800 acres (730 ha), spread over the entire town, and contains 20 contributing properties, including Meadowlawn Plantation. Architectural styles include the Gothic Revival, Greek Revival, and other Victorian styles.

== Contributing Properties ==
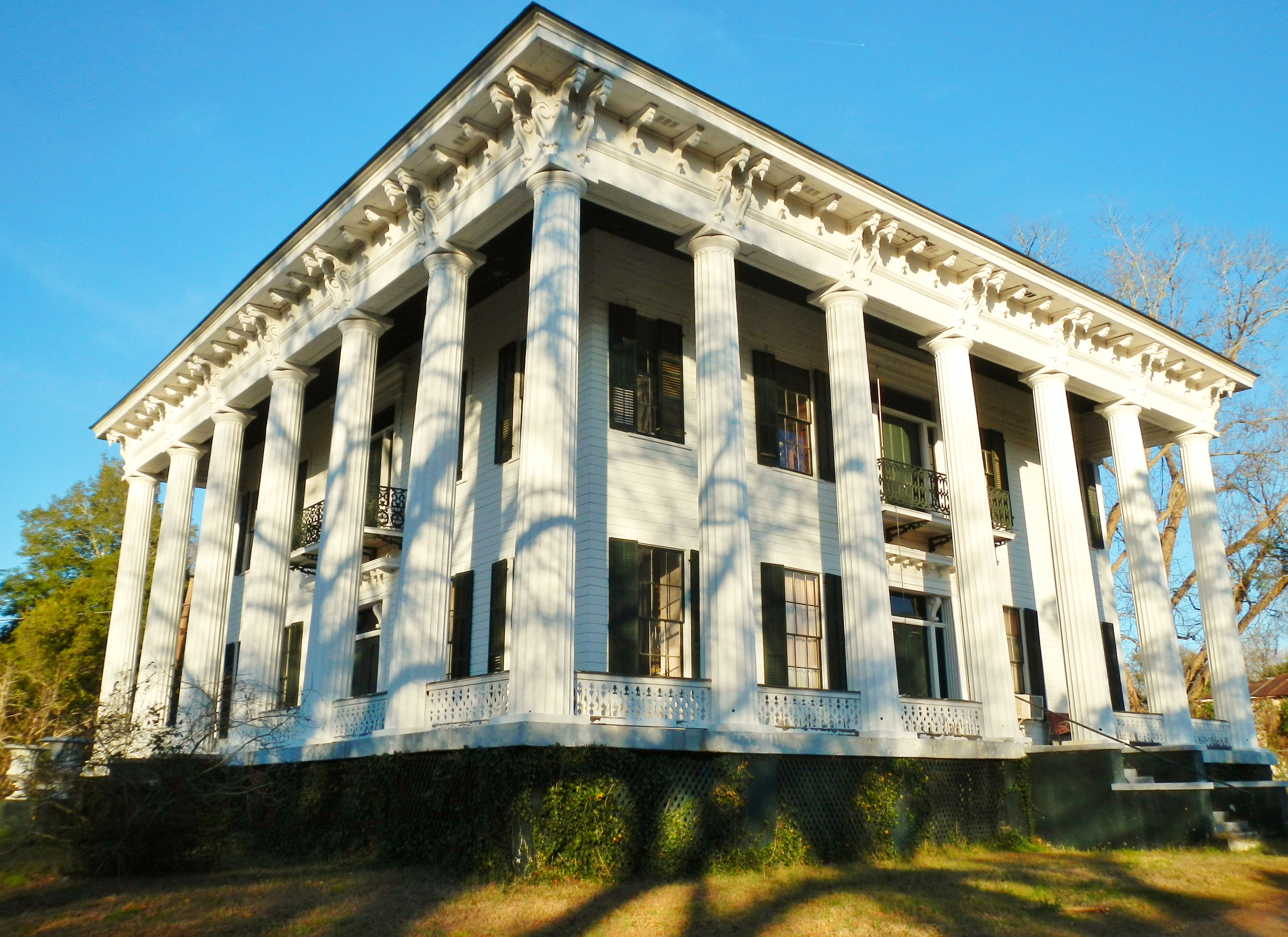
Meadowlawn was built in 1853. It was added to the National Register of Historic Places as a contributing property in the Lowndesboro Historic District on December 12, 1973.

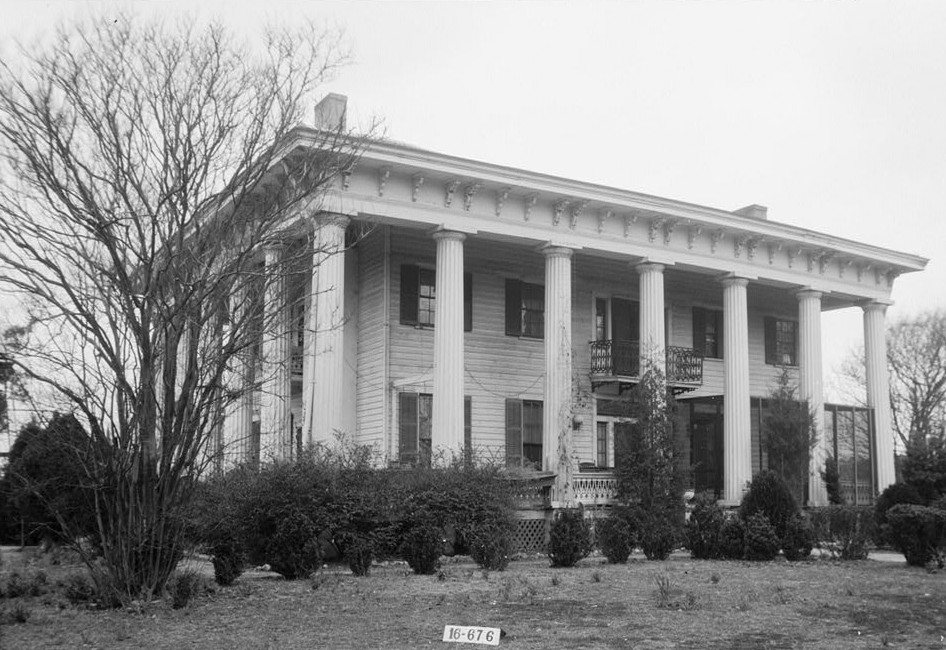
The Dicksonia Plantation was a Greek Revival mansion built in 1830. It was completely destroyed by a fire in 1964.

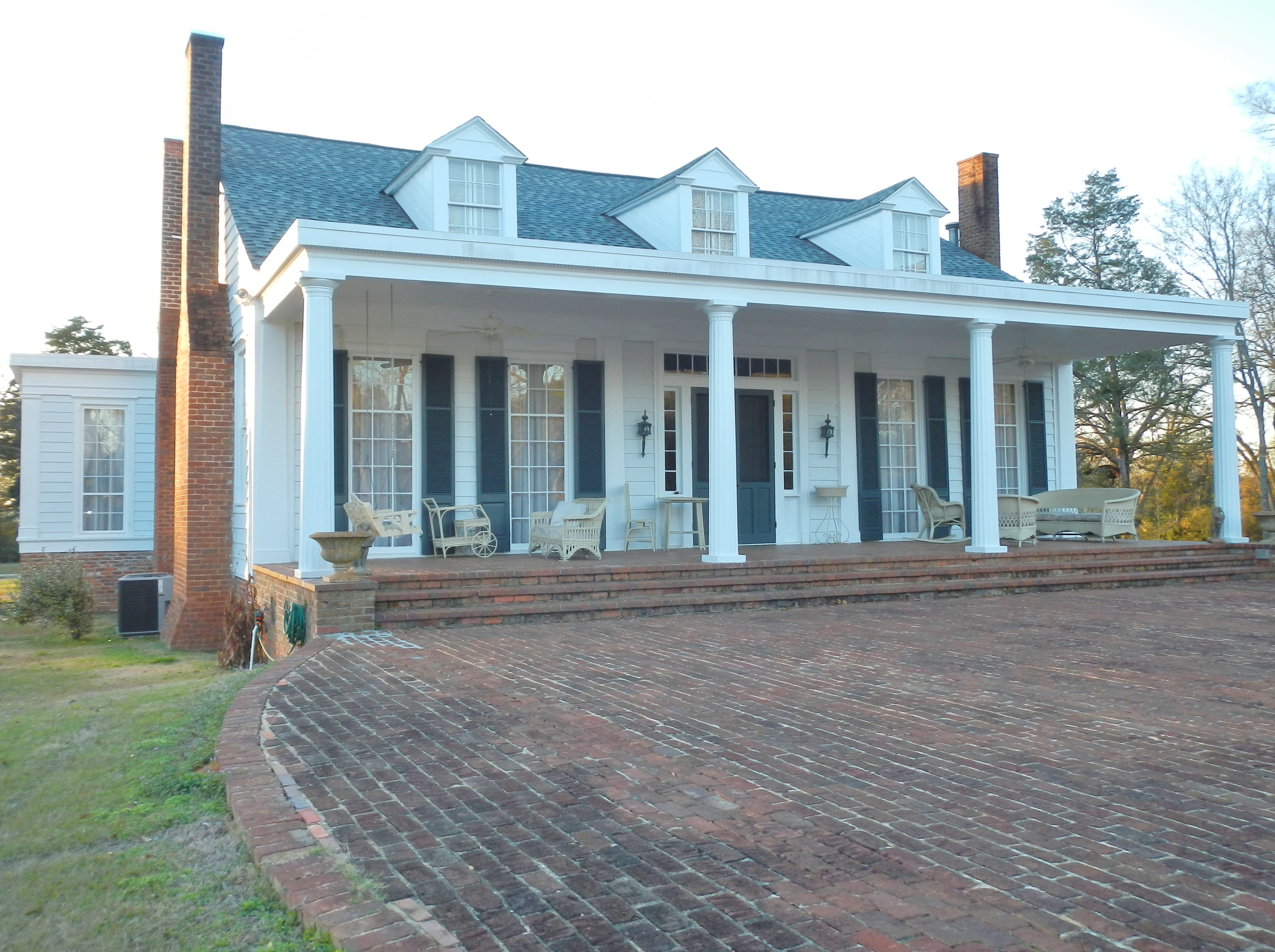
The Marengo House was originally built in Autauga County in 1847 then disassembled, moved across the Alabama River, and reassembled in Lowndesboro in 1854. On March 1, 2011, Lowndesboro Town Hall moved to the ground floor of Marengo.

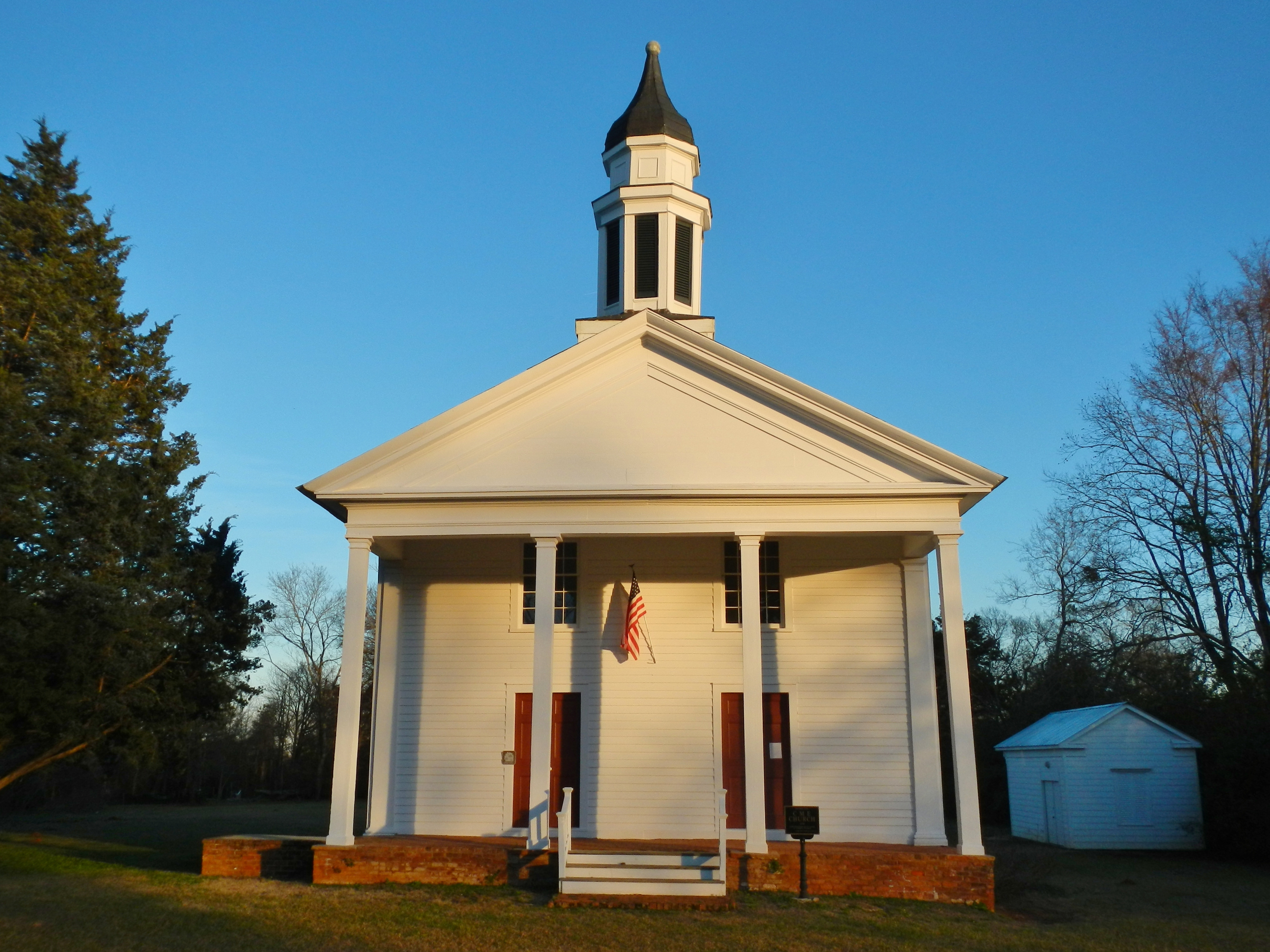
The C.M.E. Church in Lowndesboro was built in 1833. The church is now a public facility and no longer holds services. It houses the cupola from Alabama's original state capitol at Old Cahawba.

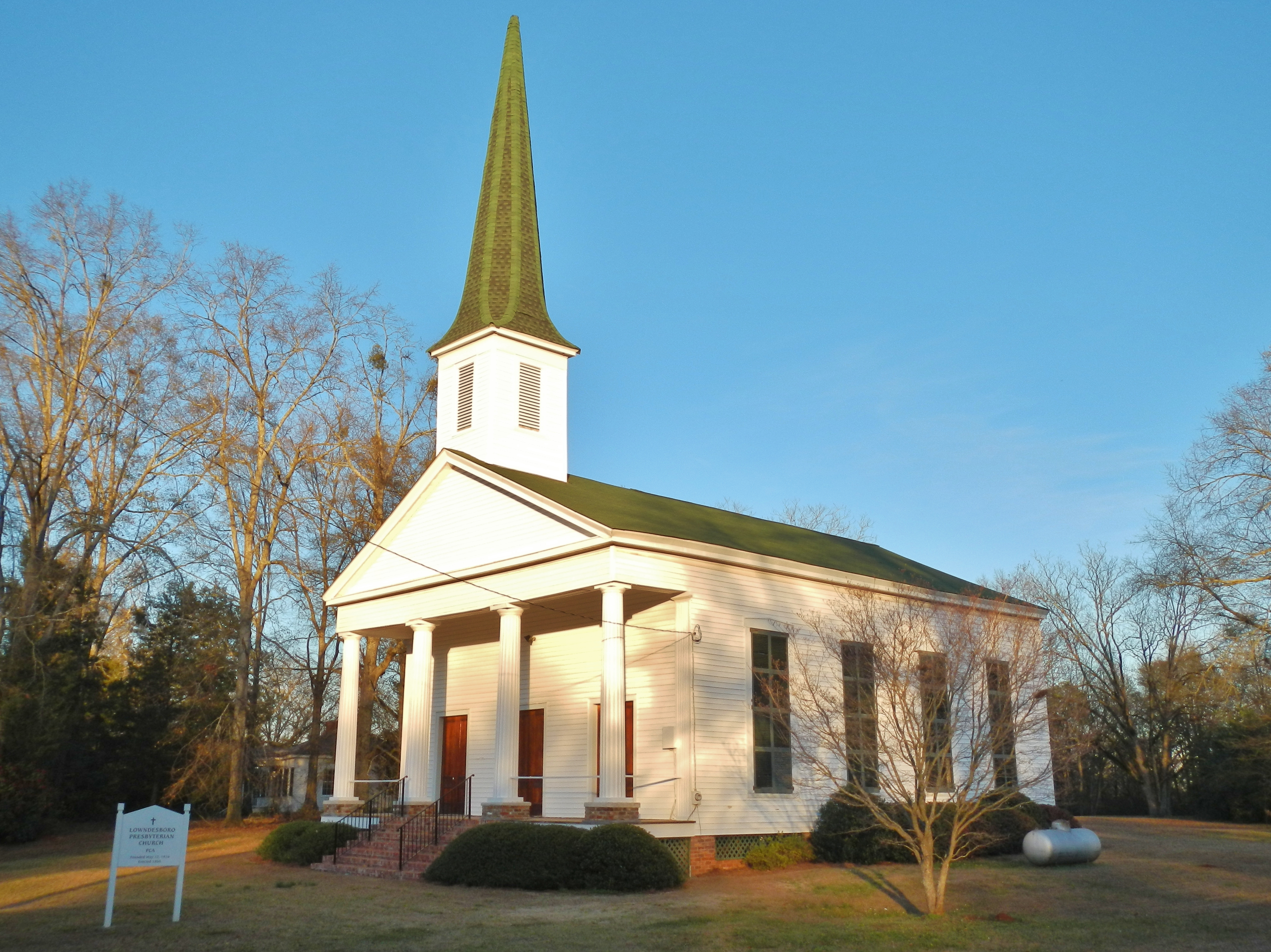
Lowndesboro Presbyterian Church was built in 1856.

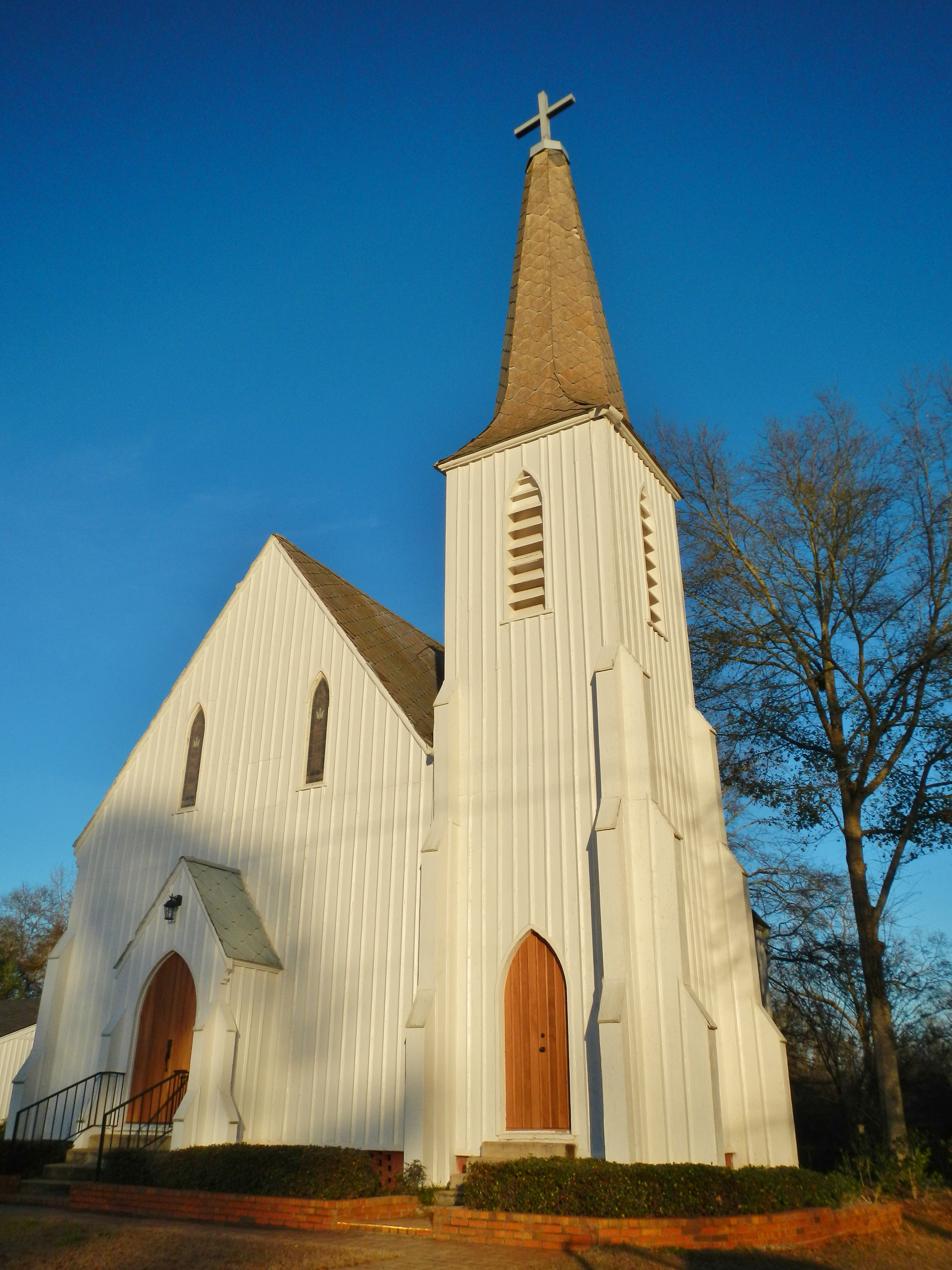
St. Paul's Episcopal Church in Lowndesboro was built in 1857.

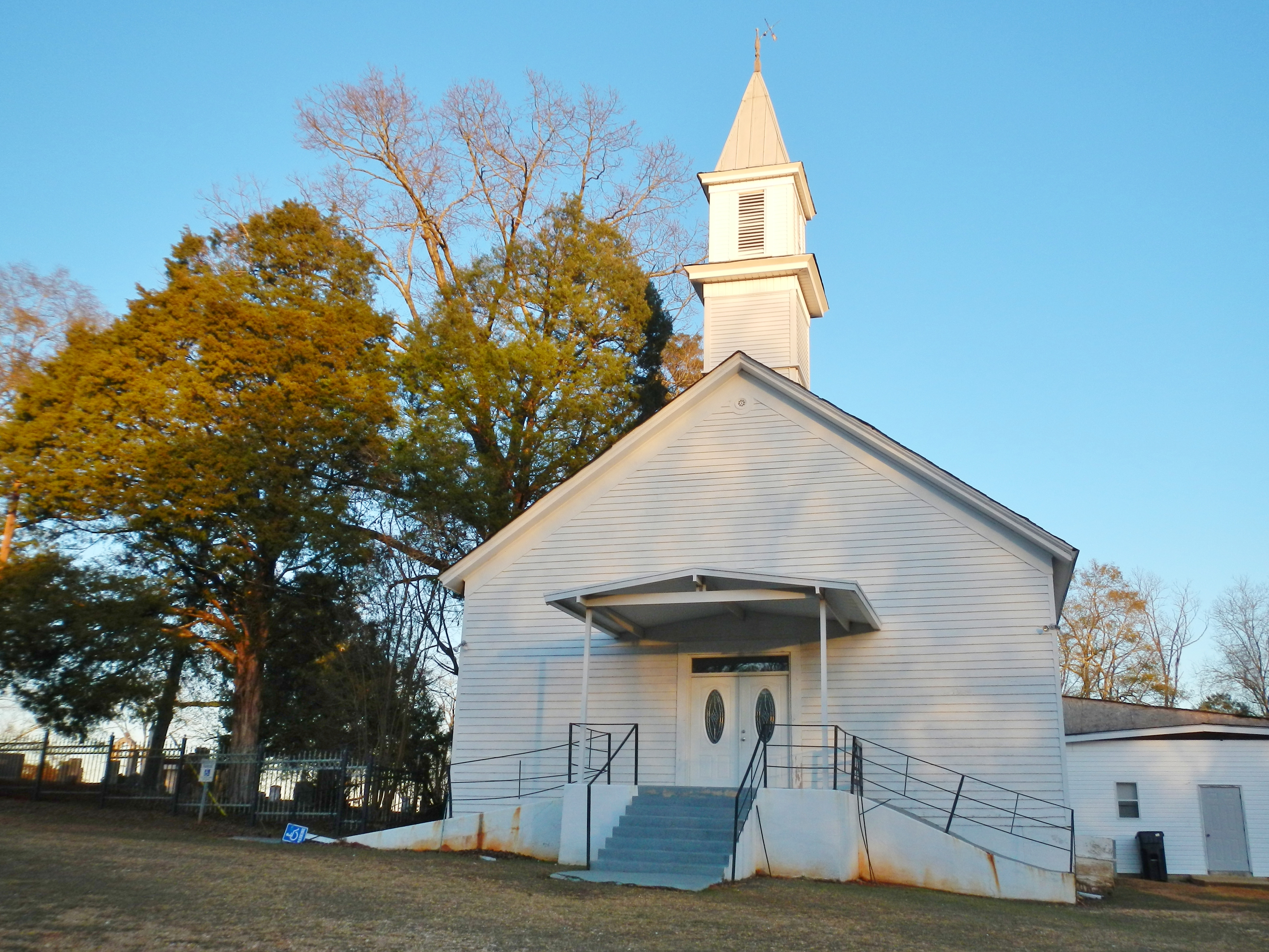
Lowndesboro First Missionary Baptist Church was built in 1880.

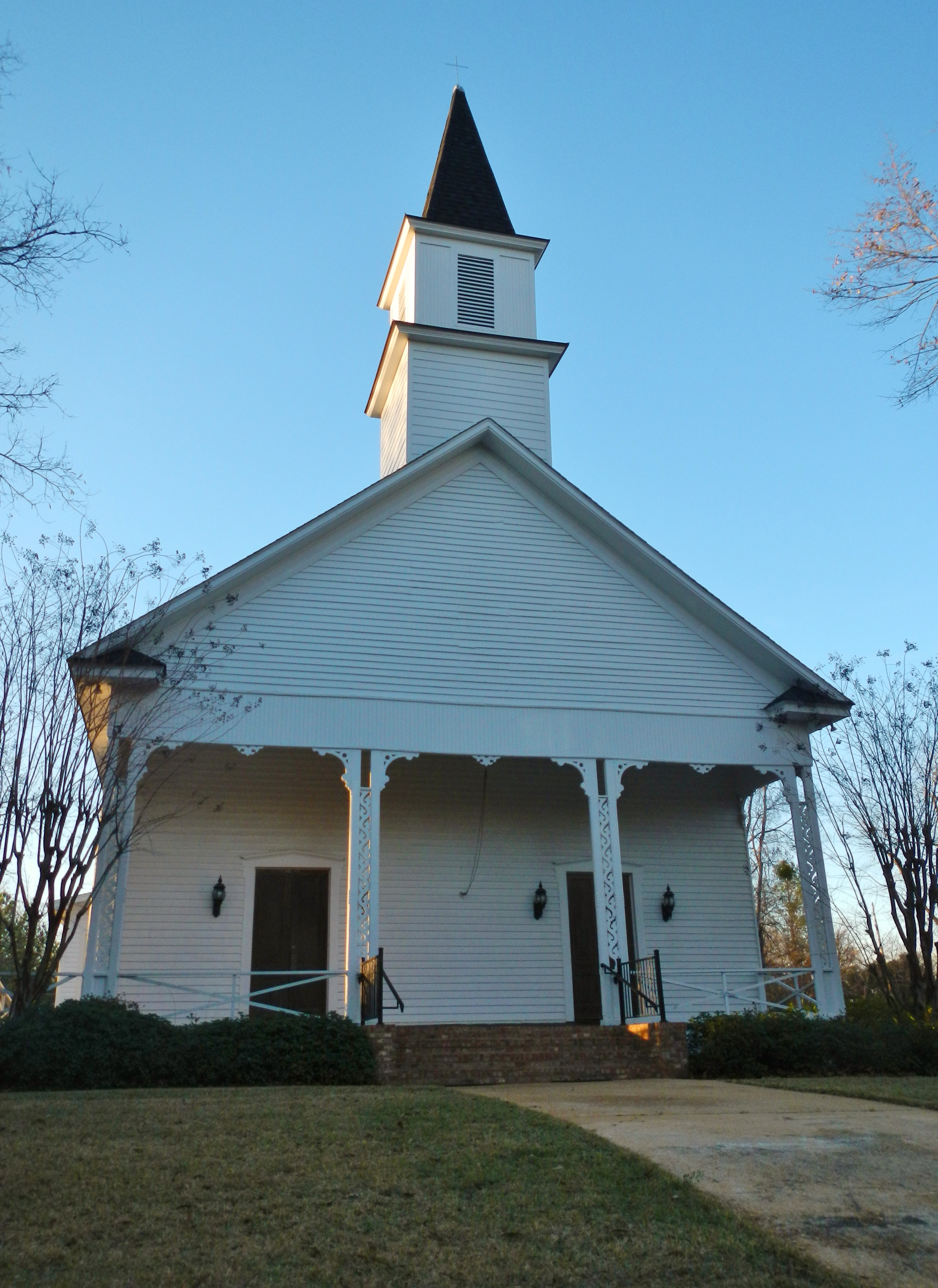
Lowndesboro Baptist Church was built in 1888.

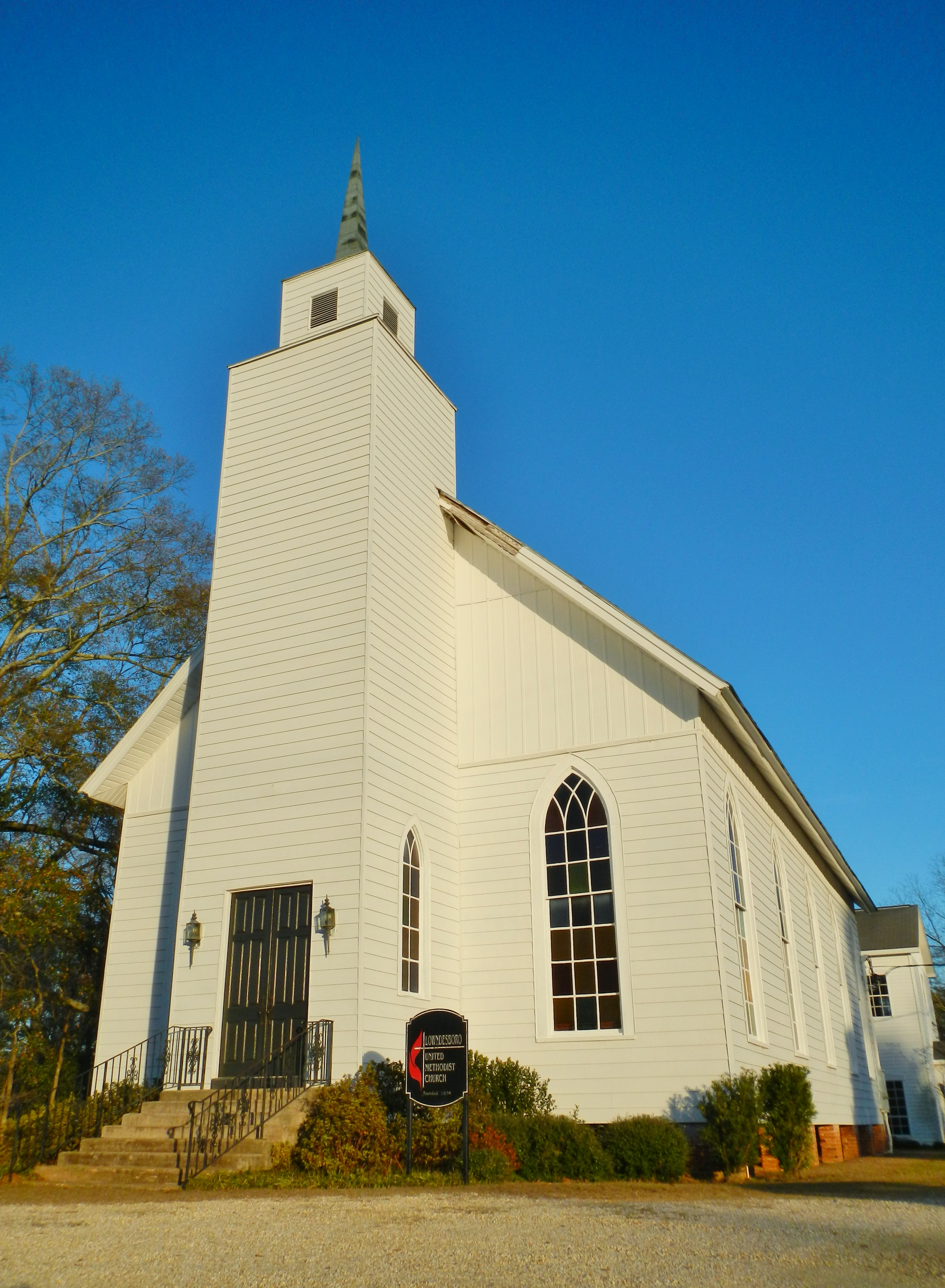
Lowndesboro United Methodist Church was built in 1888.

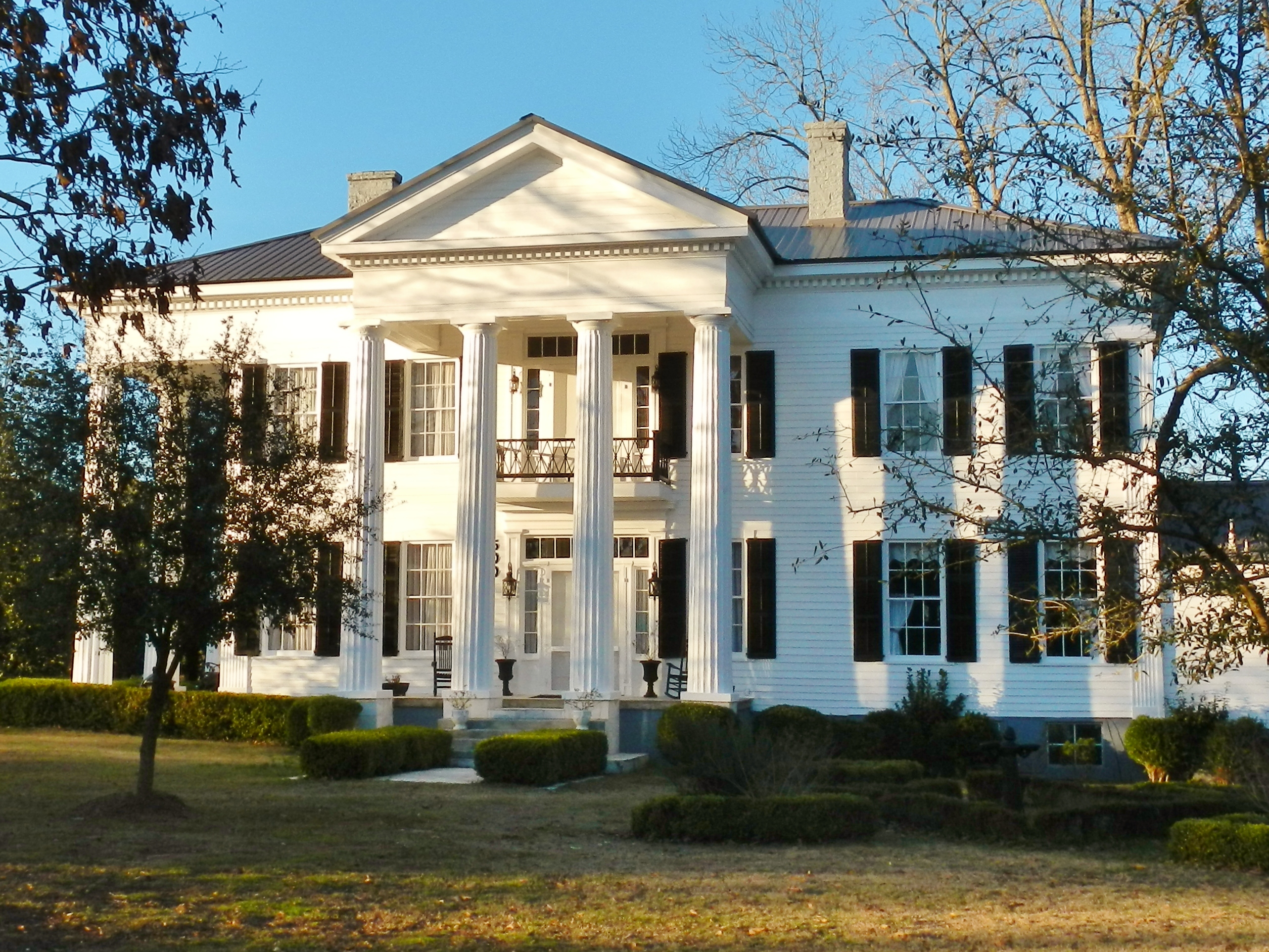
The Pillars is a Greek Revival Antebellum plantation home that was built in 1857 by Archibald Tyson, a cotton planter from North Carolina.

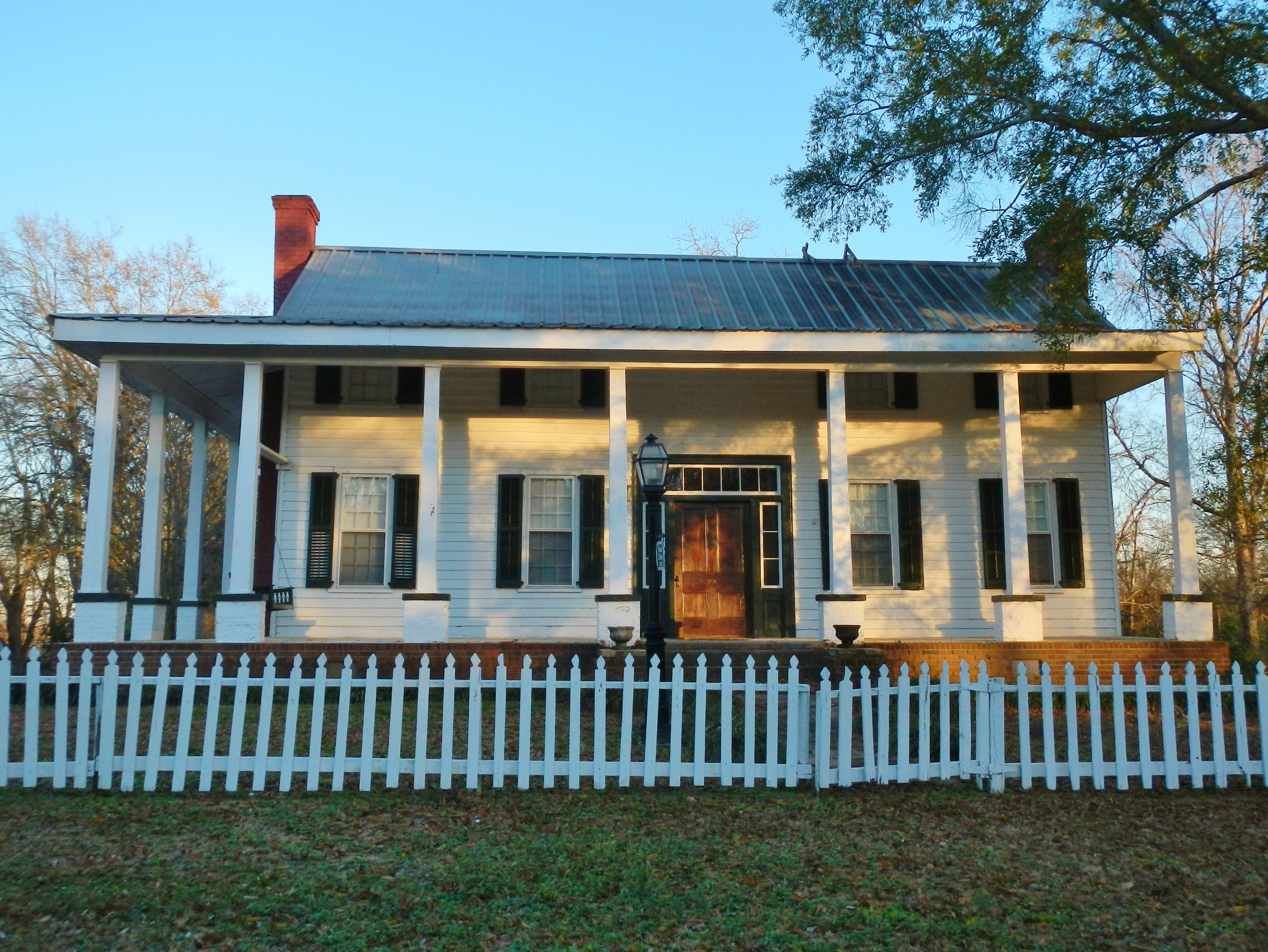
Pecan Place is an antebellum home that dates back to 1825.

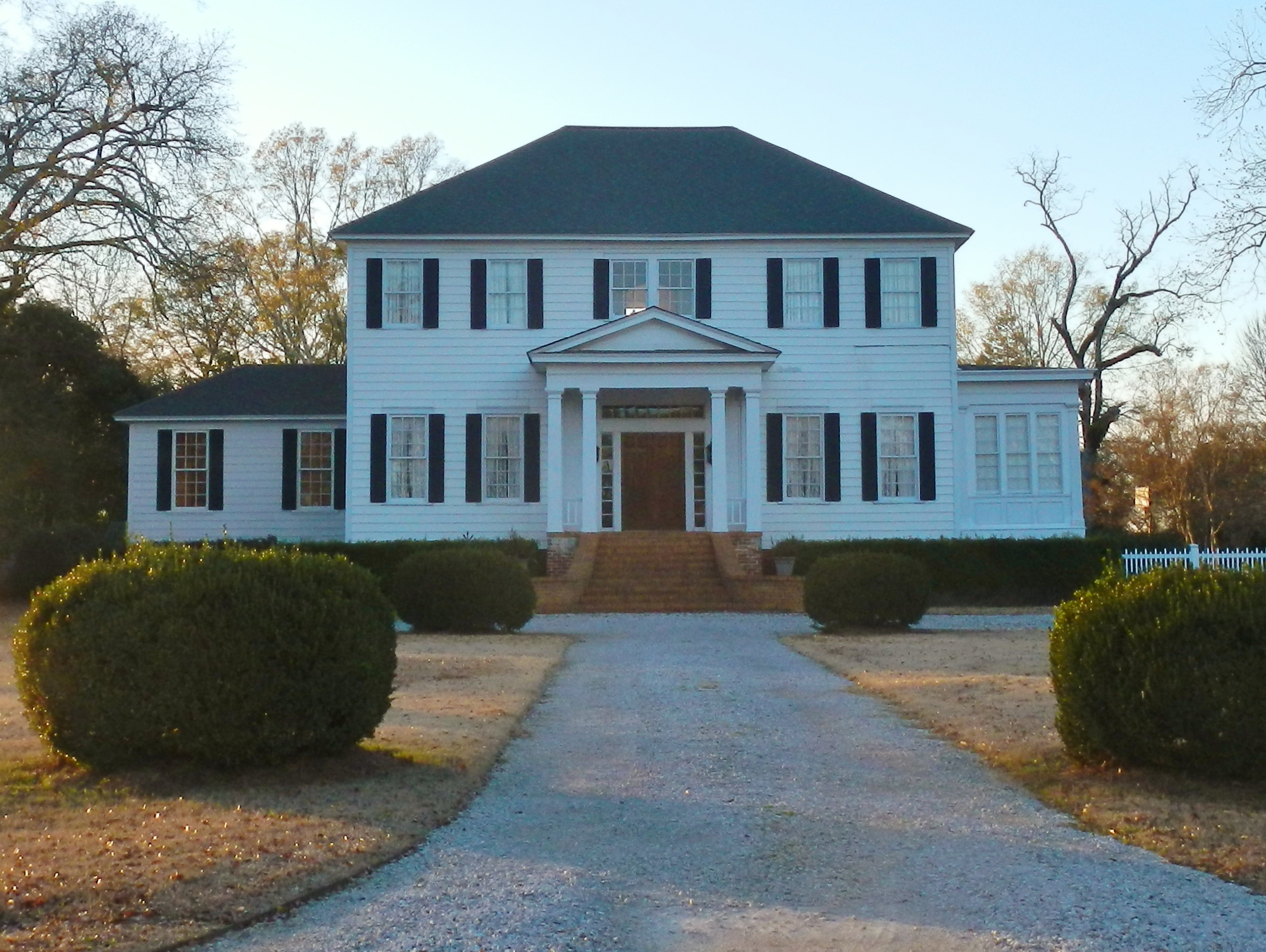
The central portion of the Holly House was built in 1836.

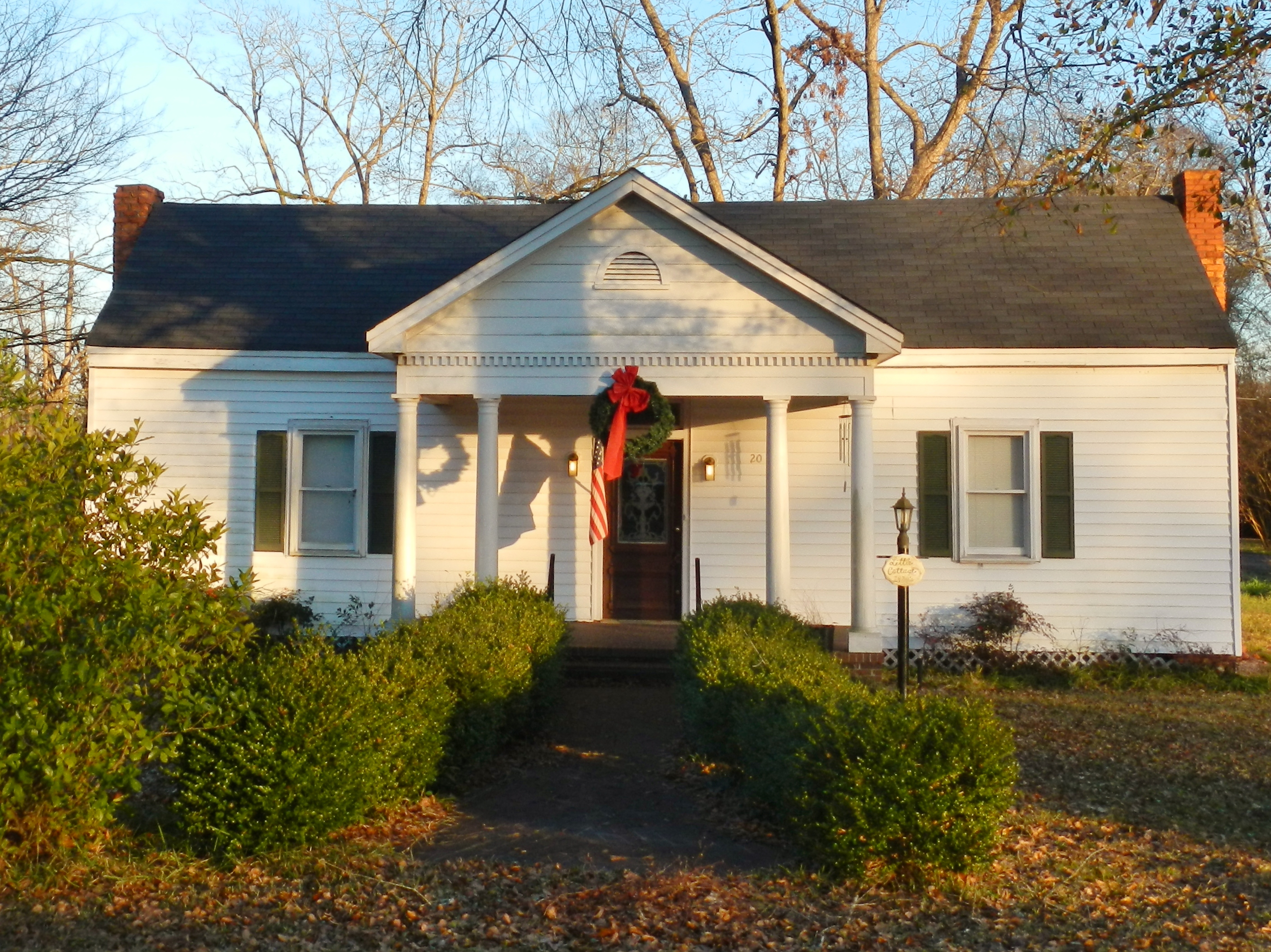
The Little Cottage dates back to the 1830s

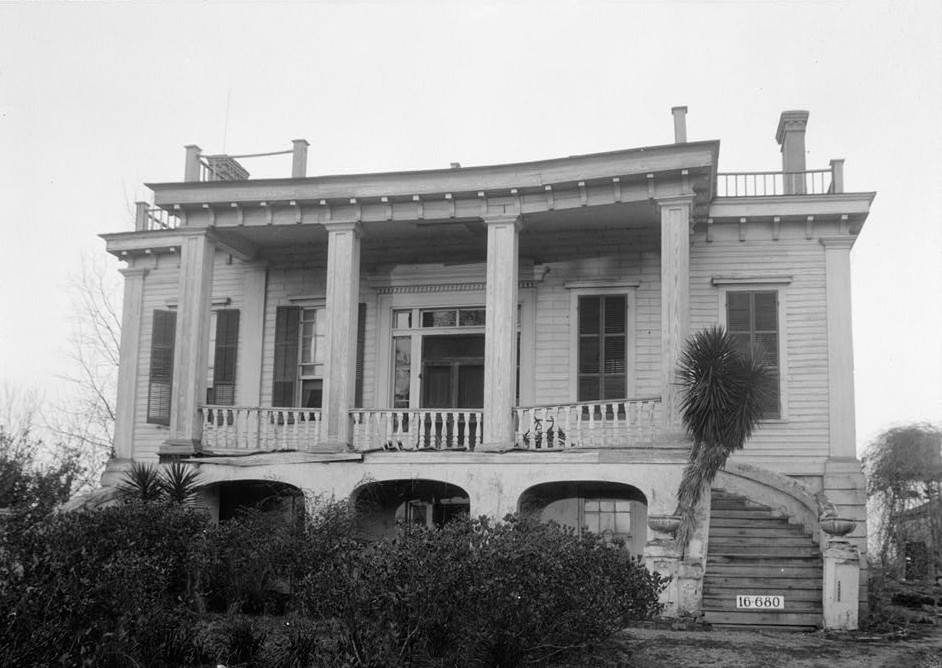
1934 photo of Rosewood, built in 1855 and now restored.

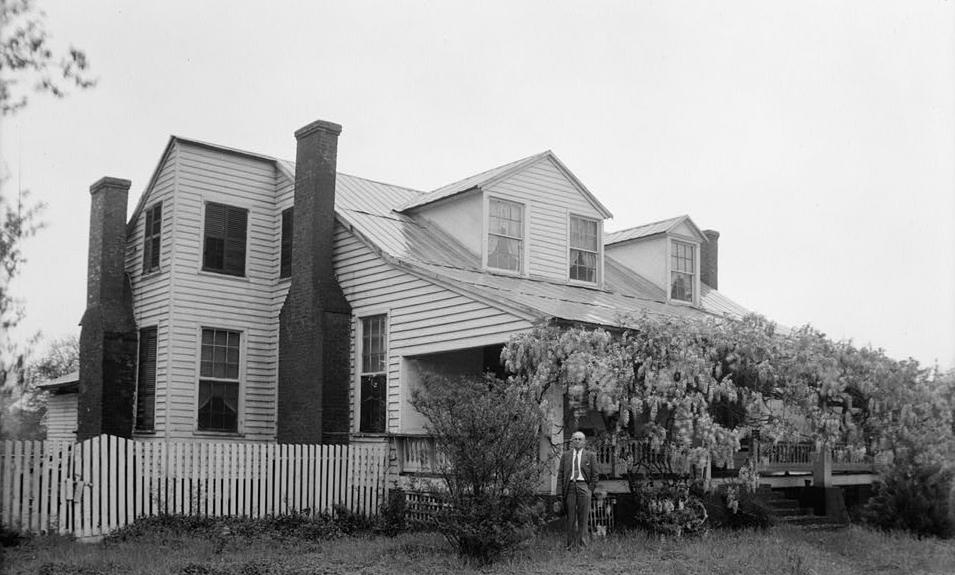
1935 photo of the Dixon H. Lewis House, built 1835.
