= Meadowlawn Plantation =

Historic house in Alabama, United States

- Meadowlawn
- U.S. Historic district – Contributing property
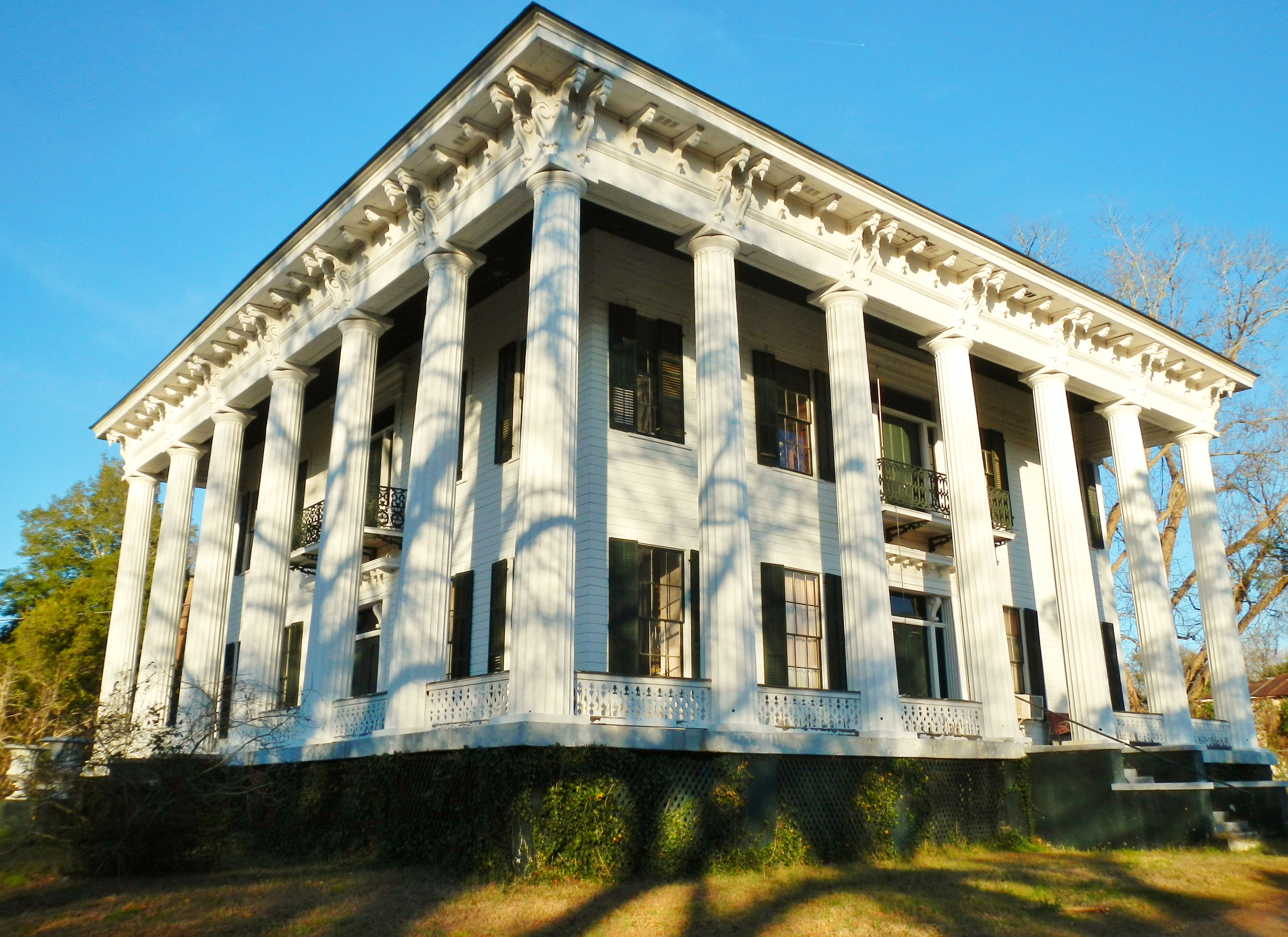
- Meadowlawn in 2012

- Location within Alabama Location within the United States
- Location: Lowndesboro, Alabama
- Coordinates: 32°16′38″N 86°36′37″W
- Built: 1853
- Architectural style: Greek Revival
- Part of: Lowndesboro Historic District (ID73000356)
- Designated CP: December 12, 1973

Meadowlawn, also known as the Hagood House, is an antebellum plantation house, built in the Greek revival style, in Lowndsboro, Alabama, United States. It is a contributing property to the Lowndesboro Historic District, which was added to the National Register of Historic Places on December 12, 1973.

== History ==
The plantation of Meadowlawn was built in 1853 for Squire George Thomas (1797–1867). The house was later sold to Fort Williamson. In 1905 the home was sold to Ransom Meadows, born June 18, 1846, died February 2, 1940. He was the last surviving Confederate veteran in Lowndes County. His daughter, Aline Meadows, born February 16, 1880, died February 16, 1979, married Robert Bragg Hagood on April 3, 1907, in Lowndes County, Alabama. It is to this couple that Ransom Meadows deeded the house. To honor her father, Mrs. Hagood renamed the house "Meadowlawn." She lived in the house until her death at age 99. The house still remains in the Hagood family today.

== Description ==
It is a two-story frame, with fluted Doric columns on two sides, 13 in all, and balconies over both main entrance doors with wrought iron railings. Dicksonia Plantation, located nearby, was very similar in appearance, prior to its destruction by fire in 1939 and again in 1964.

== Gallery ==
Historic American Buildings Survey photos taken in 1935
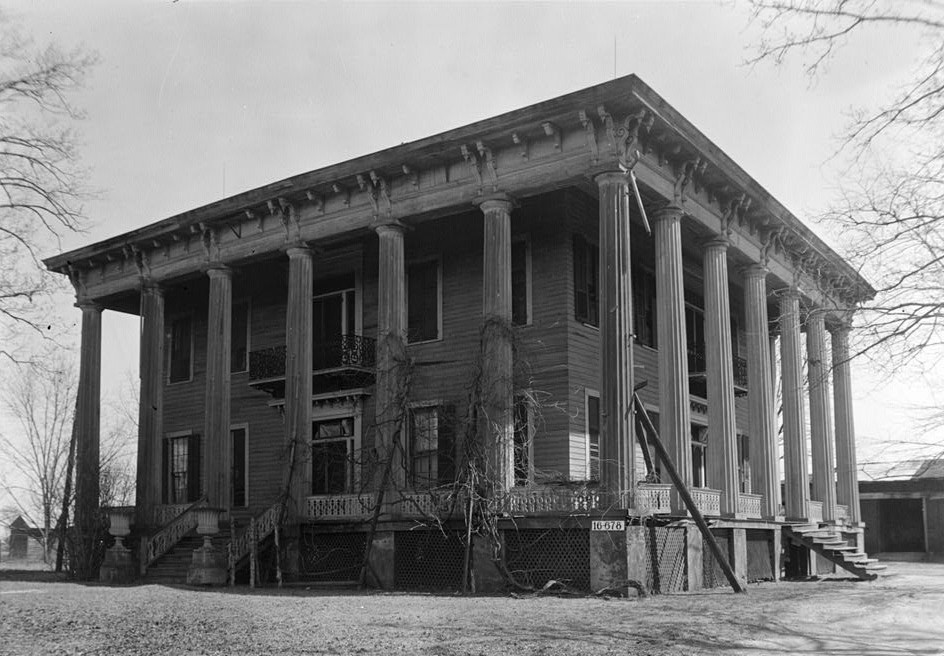
Front view.

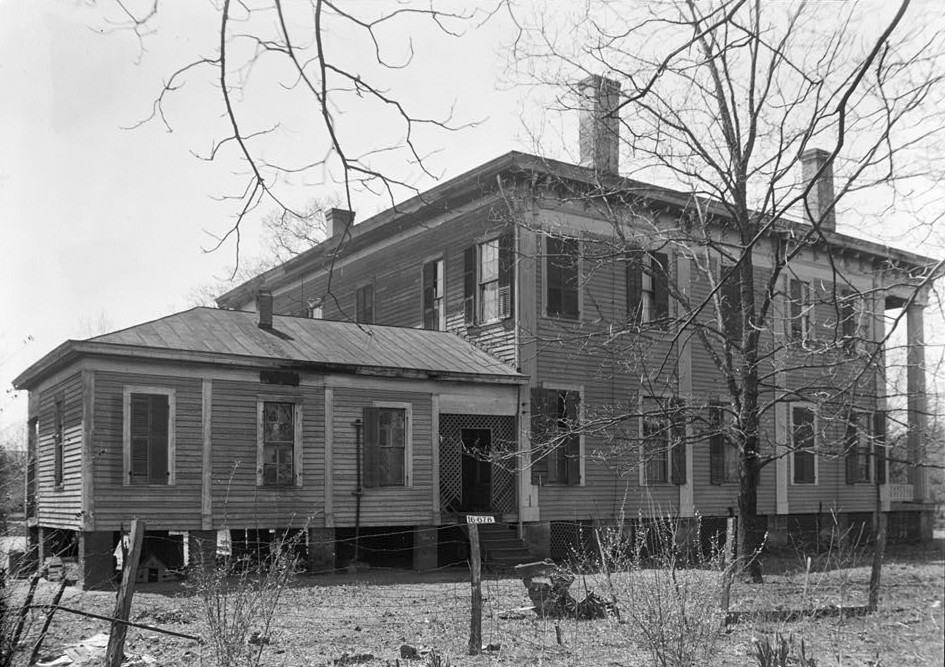
Rear view.

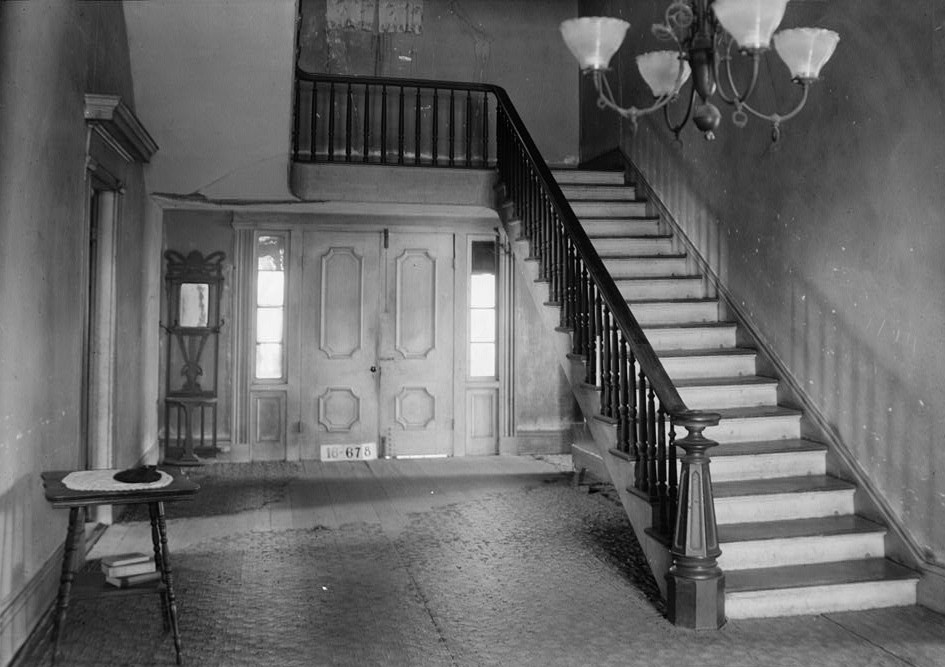
Interior hallway.
