= Lowndesboro, Alabama =

- Town
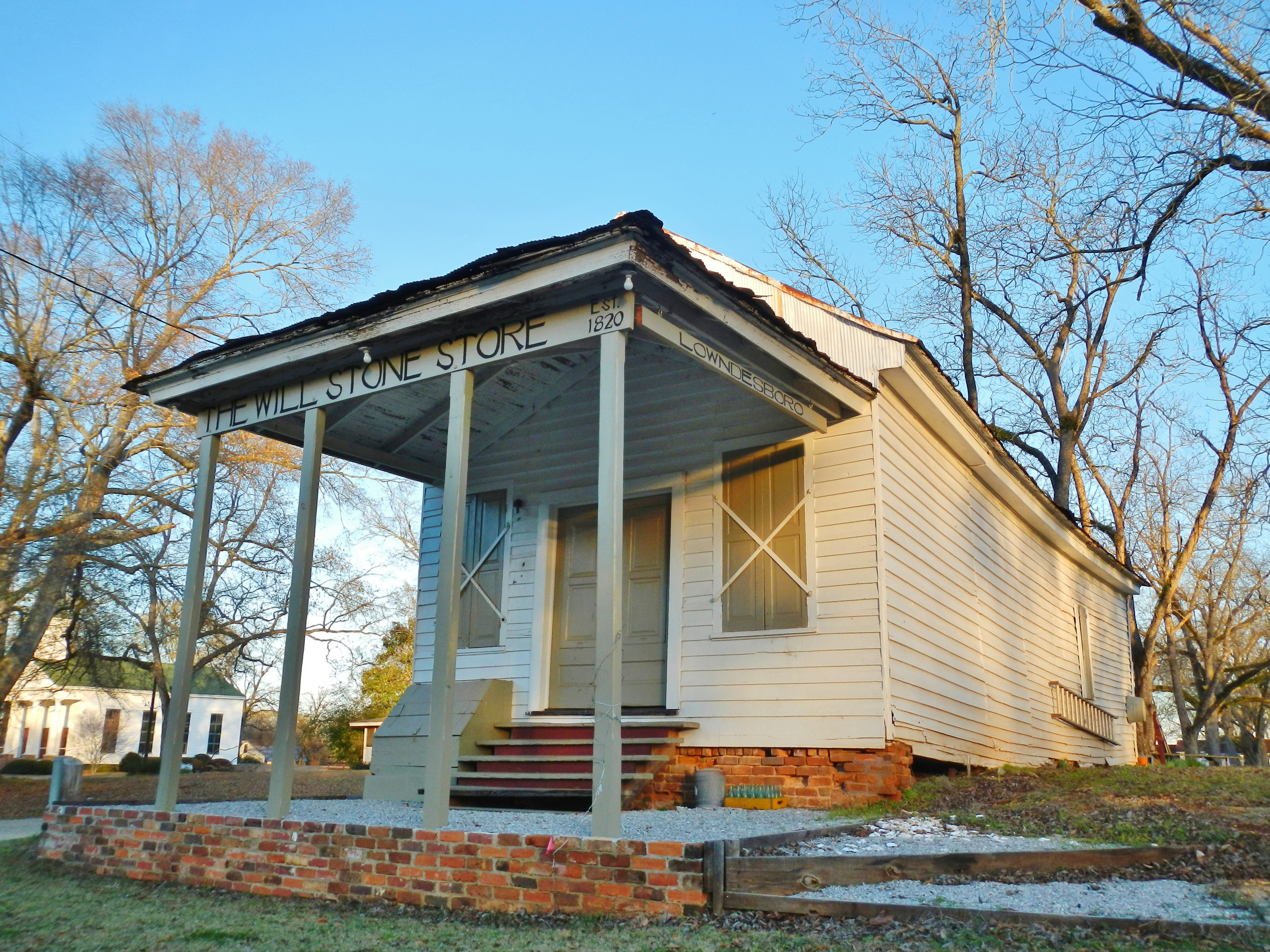
- The Will Stone Store (est. 1820) in Lowndesboro

- Location of Lowndesboro in Lowndes County, Alabama.
- Coordinates: 32°16′35″N 86°36′39″W
- Country: United States
- State: Alabama
- County: Lowndes

Area
  - Total: 0.79 sq mi (2.05 km^{2})
  - Land: 0.79 sq mi (2.05 km^{2})
  - Water: 0 sq mi (0.00 km^{2})
- Elevation: 390 ft (120 m)

Population (2020)
  - Total: 89
  - Density: 112/sq mi (43.4/km^{2})
- Time zone: UTC-6 (Central (CST))
  - Summer (DST): UTC-5 (CDT)
- ZIP code: 36752
- Area code: 334
- FIPS code: 01-44536
- GNIS feature ID: 2406051
- Website: www.townoflowndesboro.org

Lowndesboro is a town in Lowndes County, Alabama, United States. As of the 2020 census, Lowndesboro had a population of 89. It is part of the Montgomery Metropolitan Statistical Area. Although initially incorporated in 1856 by an act of the state legislature, it lapsed and was not reincorporated until 1962.

As of the 2000 and 2010 U.S. Censuses, Lowndesboro, along with Benton, are the only two towns (out of 7) in Lowndes County with a white majority of residents. Both are the 6th (Lowndesboro) and 7th (Benton) smallest communities.

== History ==
Originally known as McGill's Hill, the community began attracting settlers following the conclusion of the Creek War. In 1832, the residents changed the name to Lowndesboro in honor of U.S. Congressman William Lowndes, the son of Rawlins Lowndes, an early South Carolina governor.

With its proximity to the Alabama River, the community had grown into a prosperous town by the 1830s. Many wealthy planters settled in the area, leaving a legacy of historic mid-19th-century architecture that largely survived intact into the modern era. A brief skirmish was fought at Lowndesboro in April 1865 between a group of Confederate cavalry and advance troops of the Union Army during Wilson's Raid. Federal troops occupied the town after driving off the Confederate force, with very little destruction noted from the occupation, thus preserving many of the antebellum houses and structures in the Lowndesboro Historic District.

Like many small Southern communities with an economy based on cotton production and trade, Lowndesboro declined rapidly in the post-war years. At least partially attributed to this decline was the survival of much of the pre-war architecture into the 20th century, making it a unique assemblage of 19th-century architecture. Today much of the town is included in the Lowndesboro Historic District, listed on the National Register of Historic Places. The Dicksonia Plantation ruins are also a notable place of interest.

Lowndesboro was the site of a number of significant events in the civil rights movement. On March 25, 1965, civil rights worker Viola Liuzzo was shot to death during a high-speed chase by Ku Klux Klan members on U.S. Route 80, while driving to Montgomery to pick up a group of demonstrators waiting to return to Selma after the Selma-to-Montgomery march. The Klansmen spotted the white Liuzzo and her black passenger, Leroy Moton, at a stoplight in Selma, catching up to the pair about two miles (3 km) west of Lowndesboro.

In 1966, a number of Lowndes County African-American families were evicted from their homes in retaliation for their participation in the movement. Twenty of these families set up a tent city outside of Lowndesboro rather than flee the area.

== Geography ==
According to the U.S. Census Bureau, the town has a total area of 0.8 square miles (2.1 km^{2}), all land.

== Demographics ==
Historical population
Census	Pop.	Note	%±
1850	500		—
1880	472		—
1970	219		—
1980	207		−5.5%
1990	139		−32.9%
2000	140		0.7%
2010	115		−17.9%
2020	89		−22.6%
U.S. Decennial Census; 2013 estimate

Lowndesboro (also spelled as Lowndesborough in the 19th century) appeared on the 1850 and 1880 U.S. Census records (and acknowledged in the 1890 records, but not separately returned). It did not appear again until 1970. In 1880, it was the largest town in the county with 472 residents, ahead of Fort Deposit (350) and White Hall (168), the only two other communities separately returned.

As of the census of 2000, there were 140 people, 58 households, and 40 families residing in the town. The population density was 176.0 inhabitants per square mile (68.0/km^{2}). There were 62 housing units at an average density of 77.9 per square mile (30.1/km^{2}). The racial makeup of the town was 71.43% White, 25.00% Black or African American, 1.43% from other races, and 2.14% from two or more races. 3.57% of the population were Hispanic or Latino of any race.

There were 58 households, out of which 29.3% had children under the age of 18 living with them, 55.2% were married couples living together, 12.1% had a female householder with no husband present, and 31.0% were non-families. 29.3% of all households were made up of individuals, and 20.7% had someone living alone who was 65 years of age or older. The average household size was 2.41 and the average family size was 2.98.

In the town, the population was spread out, with 27.1% under the age of 18, 4.3% from 18 to 24, 27.9% from 25 to 44, 17.1% from 45 to 64, and 23.6% who were 65 years of age or older. The median age was 42 years. For every 100 females, there were 94.4 males. For every 100 females age 18 and over, there were 88.9 males.

The median income for a household in the town was $27,917, and the median income for a family was $35,833. Males had a median income of $23,750 versus $41,250 for females. The per capita income for the town was $17,101. There were 16.0% of families and 29.7% of the population living below the poverty line, including 39.4% of under eighteens and 38.6% of those over 64.

== Education ==
Private schools

- Lowndes Academy

== Notable people ==
- Noble C. Powell, prominent leader in the Episcopal Church in the United States of America
- Rick Pate, former mayor of Lowndesboro, and current Commissioner of Alabama Department of Agriculture and Industries

== Gallery ==
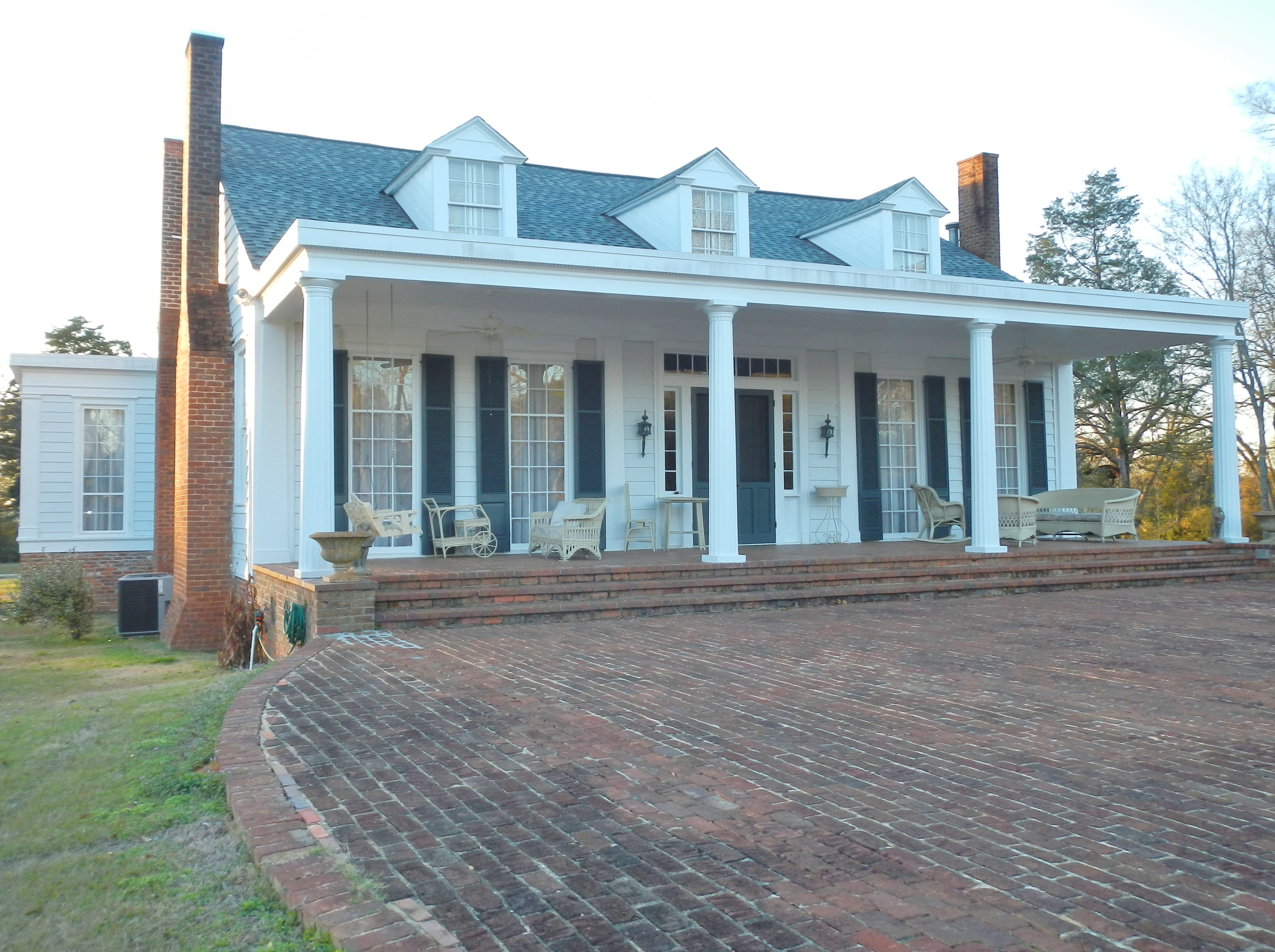
The Marengo House was originally built in Autauga County in 1847 then disassembled, moved across the Alabama River, and reassembled in Lowndesboro in 1854. On March 1, 2011, Lowndesboro Town Hall moved to the ground floor of Marengo.

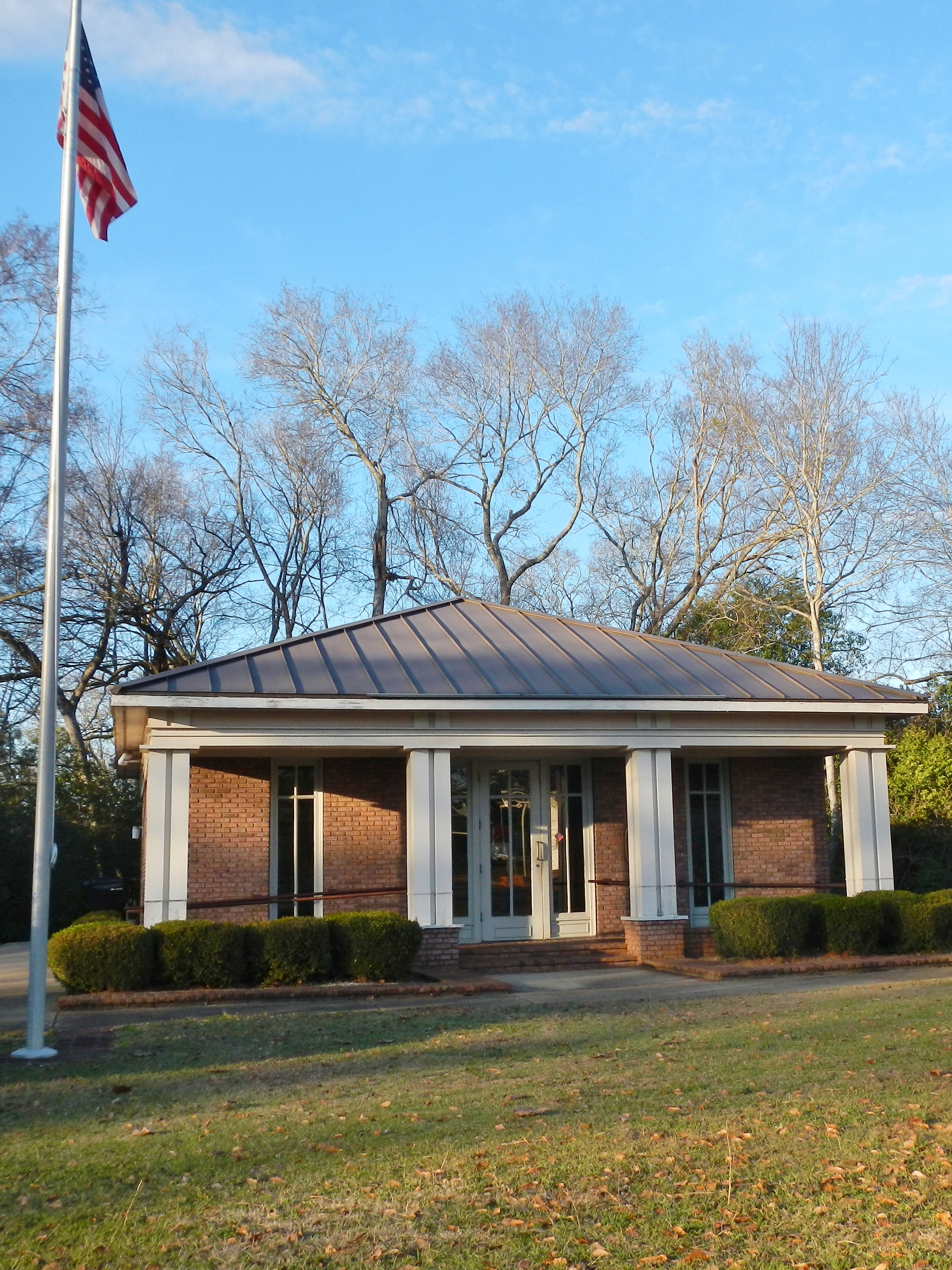
Lowndesboro Post Office (ZIP Code: 36752)

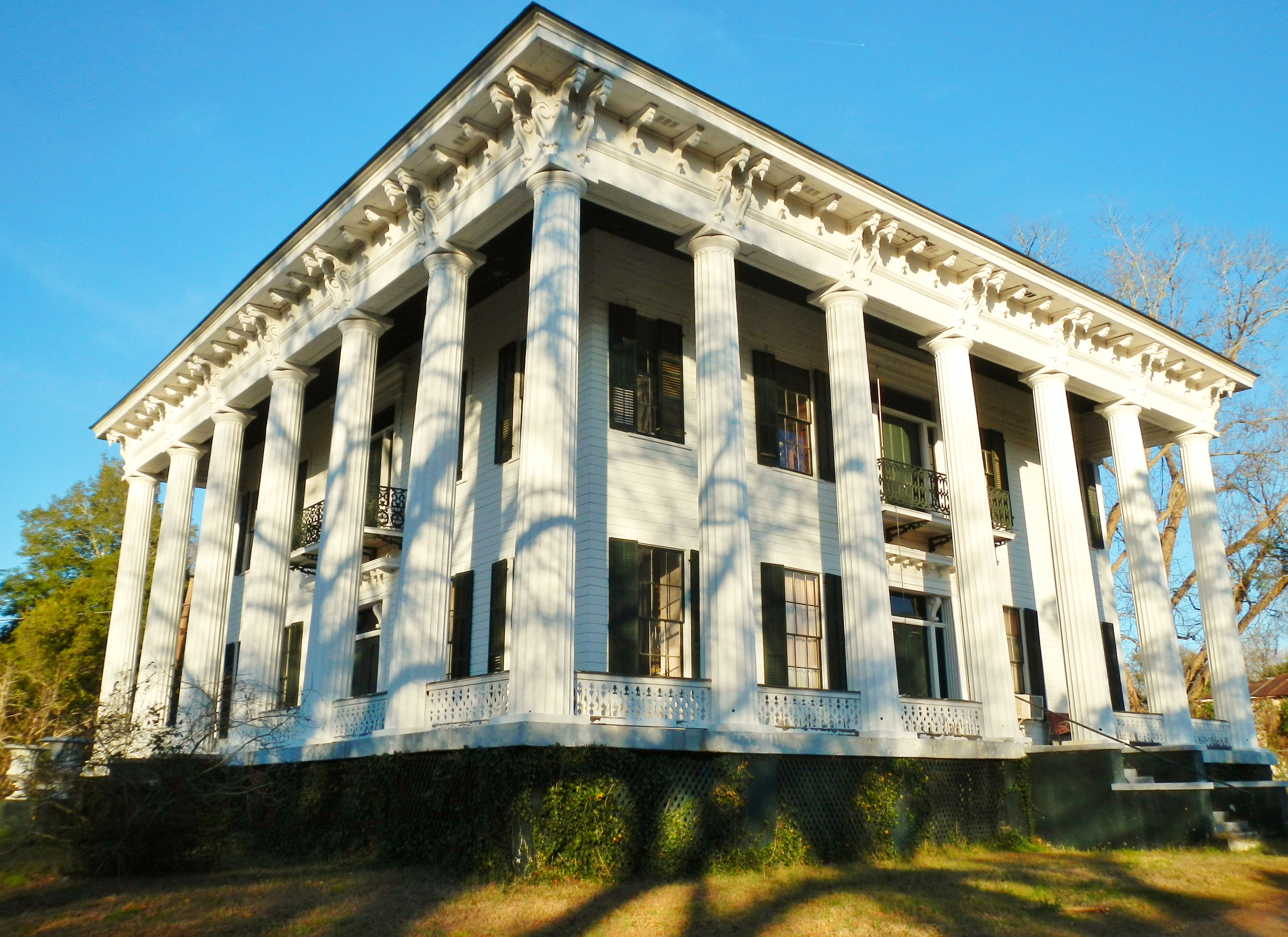
Meadowlawn Plantation was built in 1853. It was added to the National Register of Historic Places as a contributing property in the Lowndesboro Historic District in December 1973.

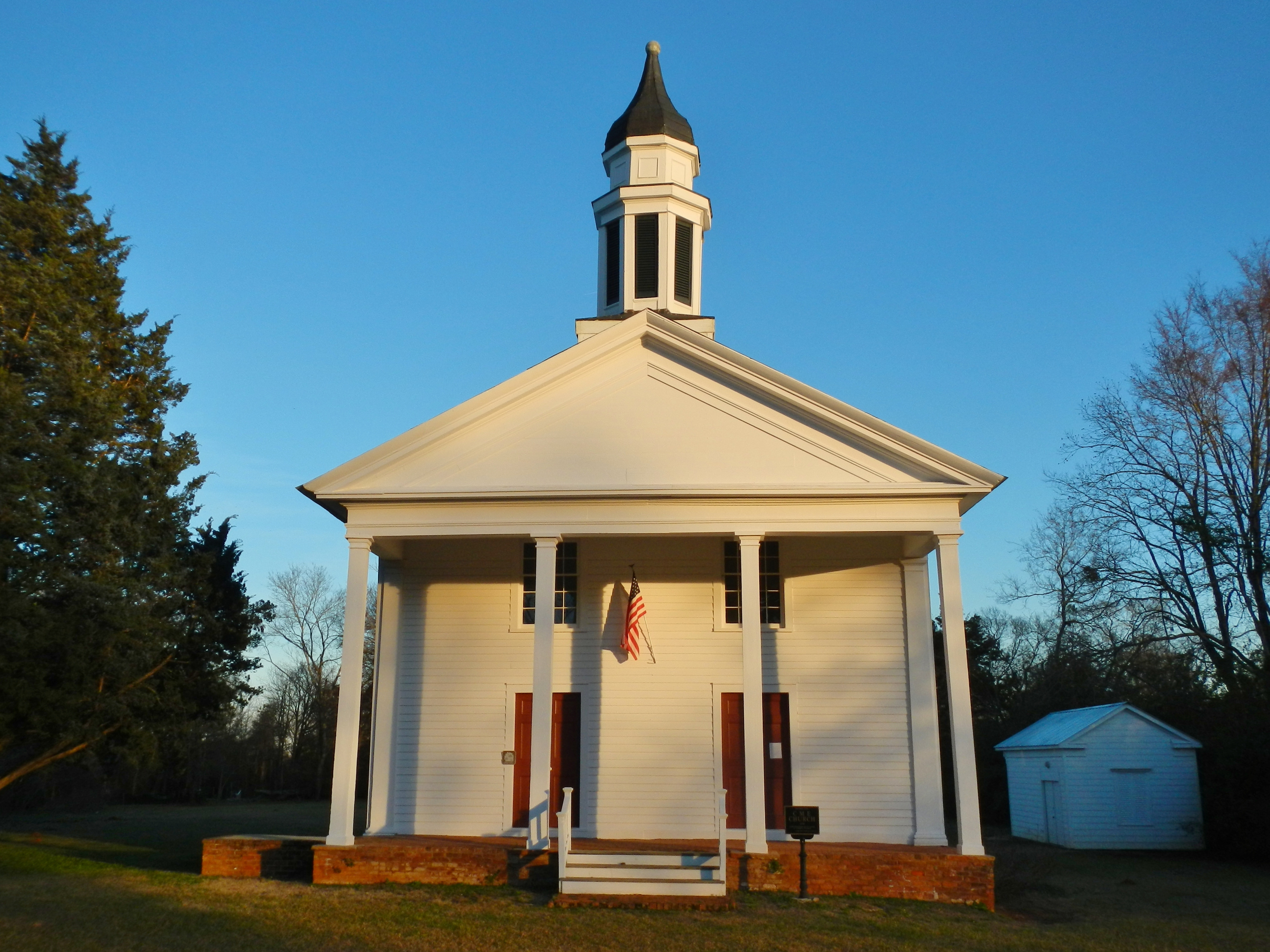
The C.M.E. Church in Lowndesboro was built in 1833. The cupola on top is from Alabama's original state capitol building at Old Cahawba.

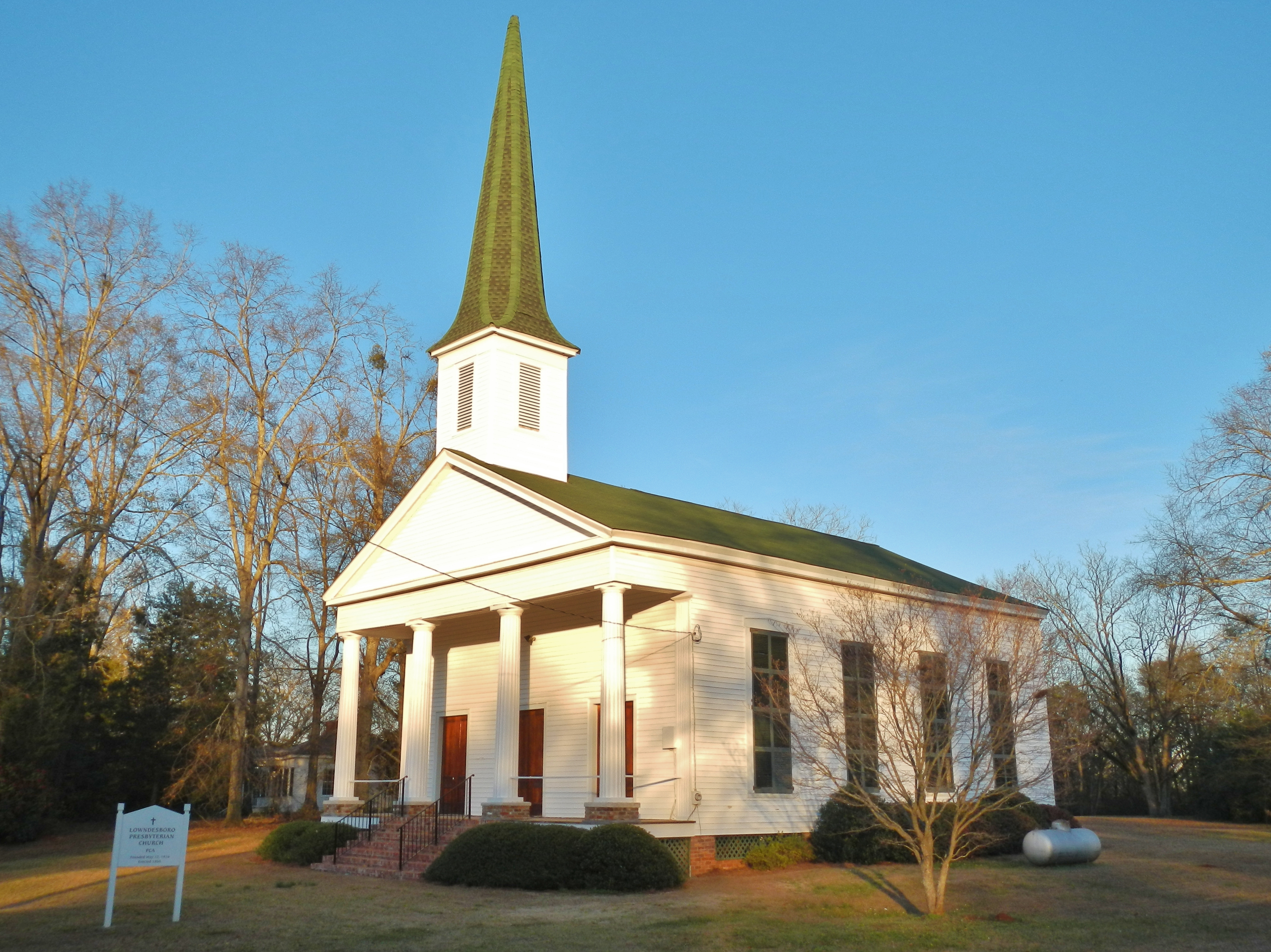
Lowndesboro Presbyterian Church was founded in 1816, is a member of the Presbyterian Church in America, still holding regular worship services.

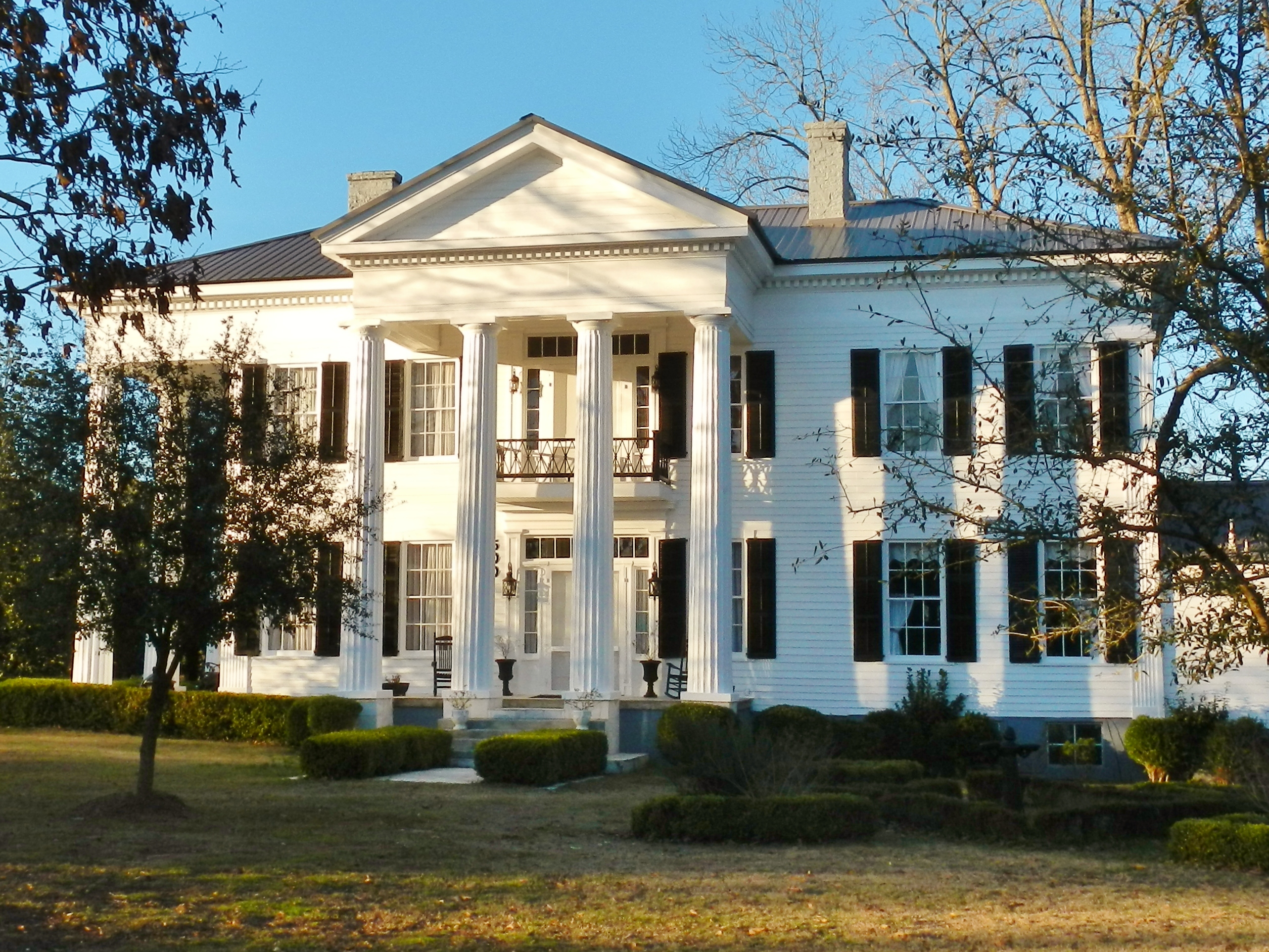
The Pillars is a Greek Revival antebellum plantation home that was built in 1857 by Archibald Tyson, a cotton planter from North Carolina.

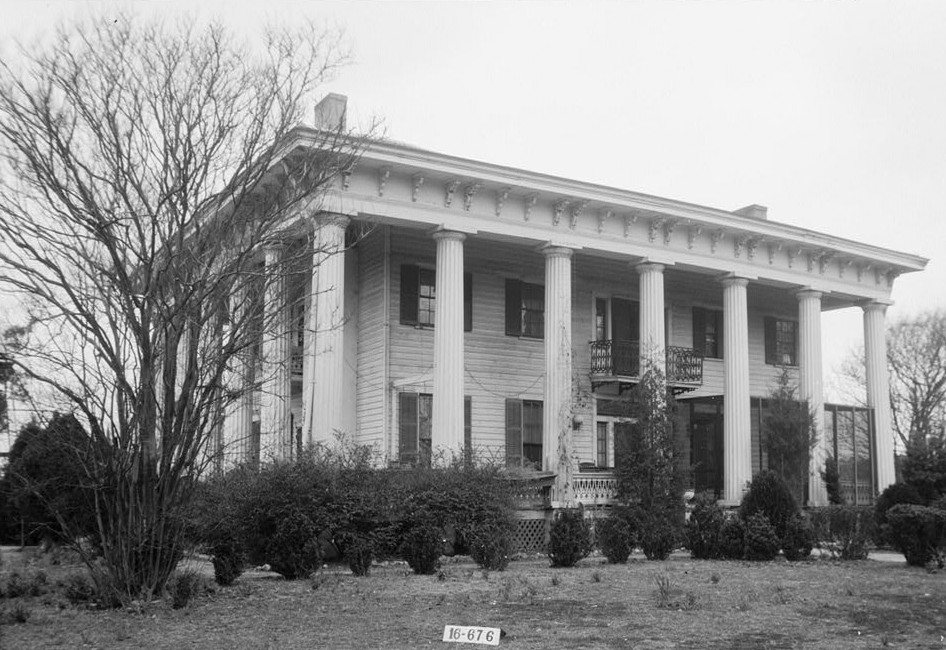
The Dicksonia Plantation was a Greek Revival mansion built in 1830. It was completely destroyed by a fire in 1964.
