= Alan Koch (baseball) =

American baseball player (1938–2015)

- Pitcher
- Born: March 25, 1938; Decatur, Alabama, U.S.
- Died: May 22, 2015 (aged 77); Prattville, Alabama, U.S.
- Batted: Right Threw: Right

MLB debut
- July 26, 1963, for the Detroit Tigers

Last MLB appearance
- September 26, 1964, for the Washington Senators

MLB statistics
- Win–loss record: 4–11
- Earned run average: 5.41
- Innings: 128
- Stats at Baseball Reference

Teams
- Detroit Tigers (1963–1964); Washington Senators (1964)

Alan Goodman Koch (March 25, 1938 – May 22, 2015) was an American professional baseball player. A right-handed pitcher and graduate of Auburn University, Koch spent 1½ seasons in Major League Baseball as a member of the Detroit Tigers and Washington Senators in 1963–1964. He stood 6 feet 4 inches (1.93 m) tall and weighed 195 pounds (88 kg). He was Jewish. He attended Decatur High School in Decatur, Alabama, and Alabama Polytechnic Institute.

In the minor leagues, pitching in the Southern Association in 1961 he was 15–10, tied for the league with Bo Belinsky in wild pitches (16), second in strikeouts (173), tied for third in wins, and tied for 6th in complete games (11). He came to the Majors after a posting a sparkling 11–2 win–loss record with the Triple-A Syracuse Chiefs in 1963. He appeared in seven games, one as a starting pitcher, for the Tigers that season. In 1964, he pitched only four innings during the first three weeks of the season for the Tigers, and was purchased by the Senators on May 4. Washington used Koch in 32 games, 14 as a starter, although he pitched exclusively in relief after mid-August. He won only three of 13 decisions for the Senators that season. Rather than report to the Hawaii Islanders minor league team in 1965, Koch returned home to Alabama to continue his law studies. All told, Koch played in 42 Major League games, and gave up 137 hits and 55 bases on balls, with 73 strikeouts, in 128 innings pitched.

After baseball, Koch became an attorney in Mobile, Alabama. He died on May 22, 2015, at 77 years of age, and was buried in B'nai Jeshurun Jewish Cemetery in Demopolis, Alabama.
