= Christmas on the River =

Annual festival in Demopolis, Alabama

Coordinates: 32.524°N 87.841°W

- Dates: Finale is the first Saturday in December
- Locations: Demopolis, Alabama, United States
- Years active: 1972 – present
- Website: official website

Christmas on the River is a week-long annual Christmas festival held in Demopolis, Alabama. It features a week of events that culminate with a nighttime parade of boats lighted with Christmas-themed decorations on the Tombigbee River at Demopolis. Attendance at the Marengo County festival averages about 40,000 people.

== History ==
Christmas on the River began in 1972 as a night parade of decorated and lighted floats on riverboats along the river at White Bluff. This was followed by a fireworks show. These main events have continued and the festival has been expanded over the years to now include several functions in the week prior to the nautical parade.

== Events ==
Christmas on the River begins with a matinee by the Canebrake Players, a local theatrical group. Other events during the week include a reading of The Christmas Story in the Demopolis Town Square, the Alabama Barbecue Championship, the crowning of Saint Nicholas which acknowledges the community members for their work in helping children, the "Lighting of the Tree" celebration, candlelight house tours, a community-wide church service, a concert by the Alabama Boychoir, the Children's Day Christmas Parade, and the Jingle Bell Run.

The Alabama Barbecue Championship is an event involving teams from nine states, 75 judges, and roughly 8000 participants. It became the official state barbecue championship on December 18, 1991. The "Christmas in the Canebrake" party is held at Bluff Hall, Gaineswood, and Lyon Hall, three of Demopolis' antebellum homes, the night before the finale. It includes special candlelight evening tours featuring 19th-century-style holiday decorations of fresh fruit and greenery, confections, and yuletide entertainment. The Jingle Bell Run is a 5K road race for men and women and is held on the final day of the celebration.
