= List of people from Demopolis, Alabama =

The people listed below were born in, residents of, or otherwise closely associated with Demopolis, Alabama:

== Art ==
- Geneva Mercer, sculptor and painter

== Athletics ==
- Richard Basil, former head football coach at Savannah State University
- Tommy Brooker, professional football player
- Robbie Jones, football player, NY Giants, Alabama Crimson Tide
- Andy Phillips, major league baseball player
- Paul Phillips, major league baseball player
- Theo Ratliff, professional basketball player
- Spencer Turnbull, professional baseball player for the Detroit Tigers
- Emanuel Zanders, football player, New Orleans Saints, Jackson State

== Business ==
- Arthur George Gaston, businessman, real estate tycoon, civil rights leader
- Jim Rogers, financier and co-founder of the Quantum Fund

== Literature ==
- Wyatt Rainey Blassingame, author of more than 600 short stories and articles for national magazines, four adult novels and dozens of juvenile nonfiction books
- James Haskins (1941-2005), author (Diary of a Harlem Schoolteacher, The Cotton Club, Black Music in America, Outward Dreams: Black Inventors and Their Inventions, The March on Washington, Black Eagles: African Americans in Aviation)
- Michelle Richmond (born 1970), fiction writer and essayist (The Girl in the Fall-Away Dress, Dream of the Blue Room)
- Hudson Strode (1892–1976), teacher of creative writing at the University of Alabama 1924–1964, honored by King Gustaf VI Adolf of Sweden for contributions strengthening cultural relations between the United States and Sweden

== Politics ==
- Richard Henry Clarke, U.S. representative 1889–1897
- Lacey A. Collier, lawyer and judge of the United States District Court for the Northern District of Florida
- James T. Jones, U.S. representative 1877–1879 and 1883–1889
- Francis Strother Lyon, member of United States Congress and Confederate States Congress
- Bill Owens, Massachusetts businessman and politician, born in Demopolis
- Benjamin Glover Shields, U.S. representative 1841–1943, United States Ambassador to Venezuela 1845–1850

== Science ==
- Waldo Semon, inductee of the Inventor Hall of Fame, inventor of vinyl, holder of over a hundred patents, born in Demopolis
