= Robbie Jones (American football) =

American football player (born 1959)

No. 51
- Position: Linebacker

Personal information
- Born: December 25, 1959 (age 66); Demopolis, Alabama, U.S.
- Listed height: 6 ft 2 in (1.88 m)
- Listed weight: 230 lb (104 kg)

Career information
- High school: Demopolis (AL)
- College: Alabama
- NFL draft: 1983: 12th round, 309th overall pick

Career history
- New York Giants (1984–1987); New York Jets (1988)*
- * Offseason or practice squad member only

Awards and highlights
- Super Bowl champion (XXI); National champion (1979); Second-team All-SEC (1981)
- Stats at Pro Football Reference

Robert Washington Jones (born December 25, 1959) is an American former professional football linebacker. He played five seasons for the New York Giants. He was special teams captain of the 1986 Giants team that won Super Bowl XXI. For his play during the Super Bowl year, Jones was awarded special teams player of the year by the Giants organization and also named the special teams captain during the 1986 Super Bowl campaign.

Jones attended the University of Alabama and was picked 309th overall in the 1983 NFL draft. He served as backup inside linebacker during most of his career with the Giants.
