= Curtis House (Demopolis, Alabama) =

Historic house in Alabama, United States

- U.S. National Register of Historic Places
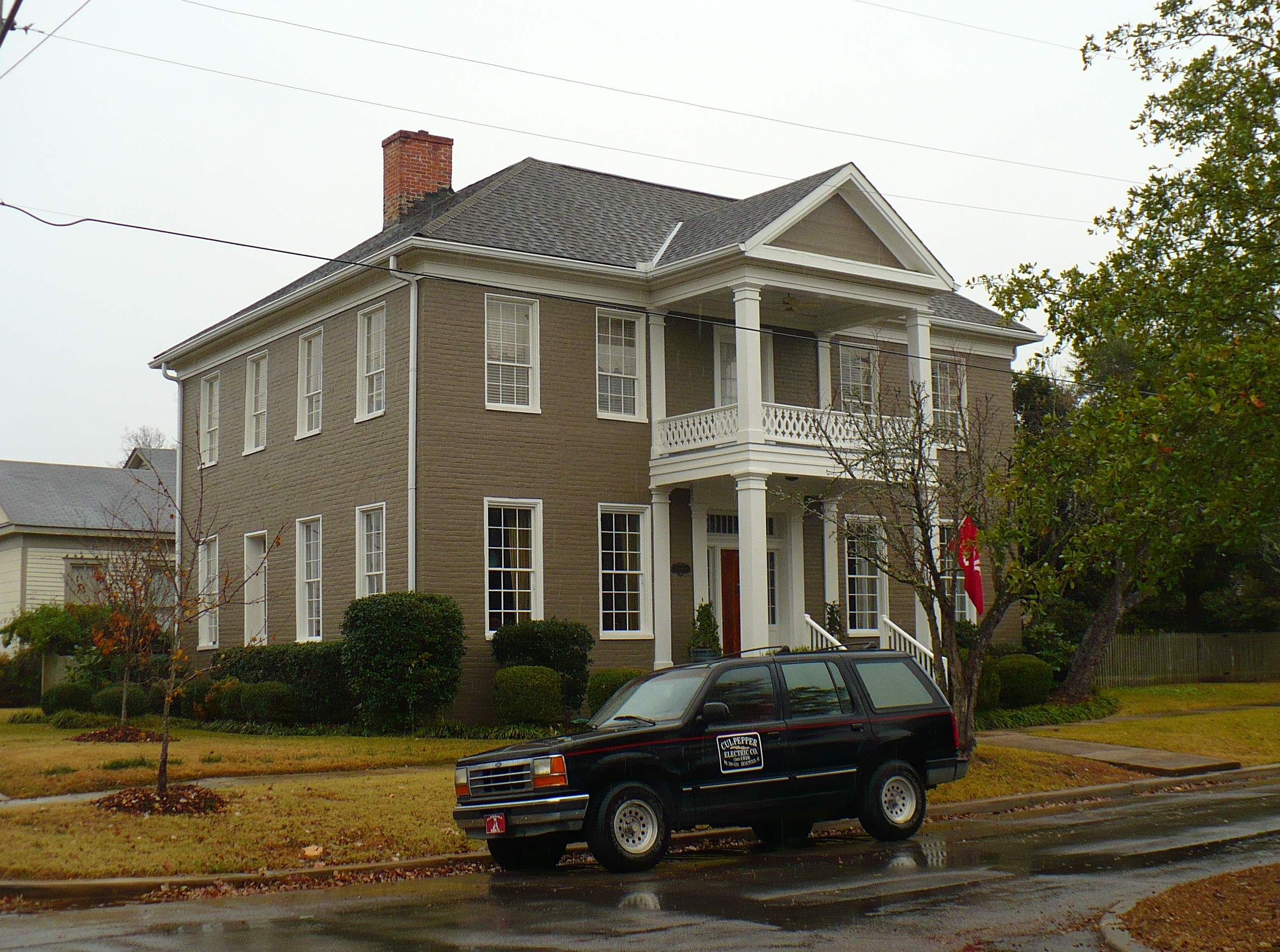
- The Curtis House in 2008

- Location within Alabama Location within the United States
- Location: 510 North Main Street; Demopolis, Alabama
- Coordinates: 32°31′14.62″N 87°50′18.46″W
- Area: 0.3 acres (0.12 ha)
- Built: 1840
- NRHP reference No.: 77000214
- Added to NRHP: April 11, 1977

The Curtis House, also known as the Howze-Culpepper House, is a historic house in Demopolis, Alabama, United States. It is a brick structure that was built in 1840 by Samuel Curtis, a Revolutionary War veteran who was born in Queen Anne's County, Maryland in 1751 and died in Marengo County, Alabama in 1846. The house was built in the Federal style, with the later addition of a Greek Revival influenced portico. It was added to the National Register of Historic Places on April 11, 1977.
