= Bluff Hall =

Historic house in Alabama, United States

- U.S. National Register of Historic Places
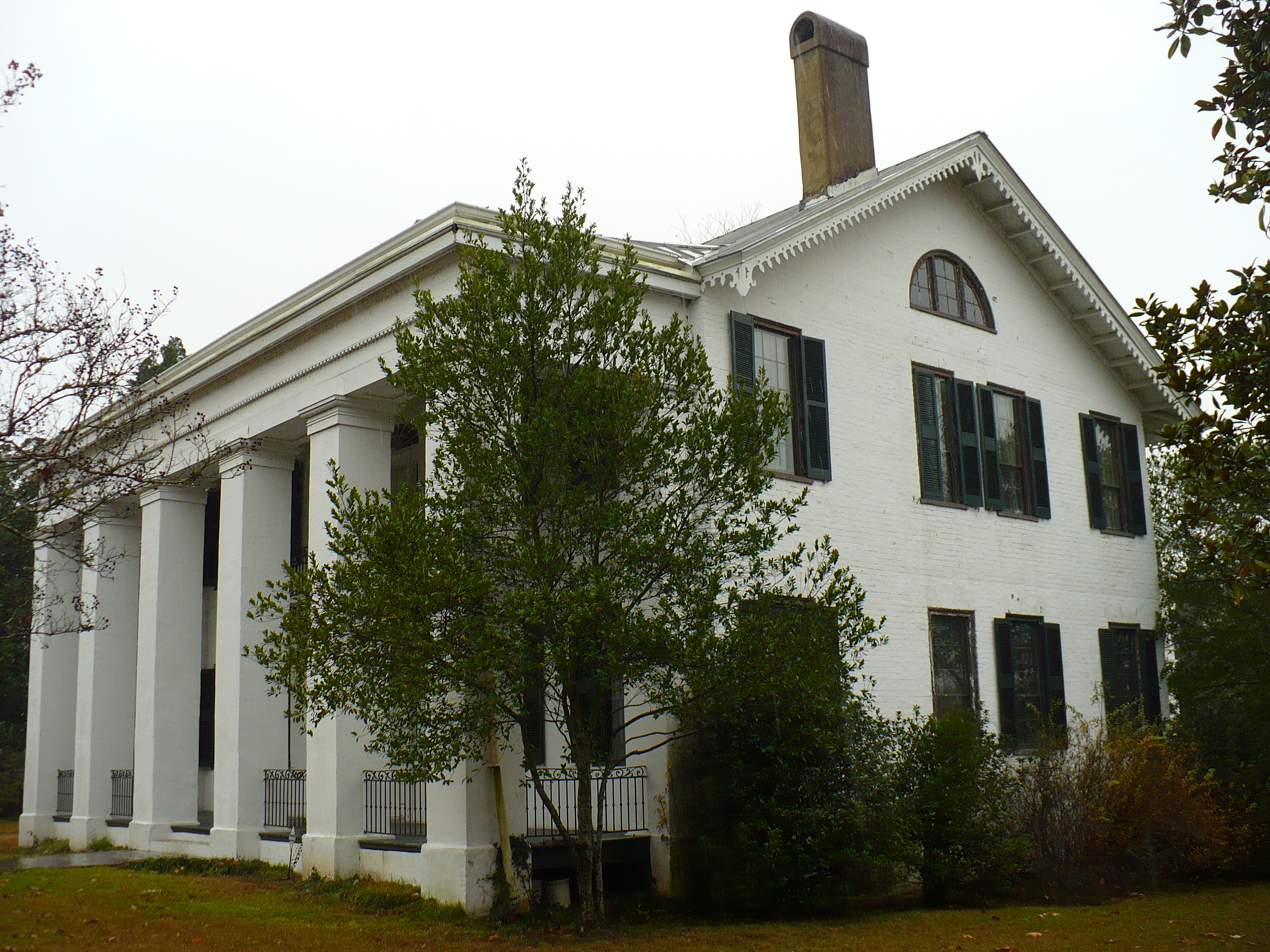
- Bluff Hall in 2008
- Location: 405 N. Commissioners Avenue; Demopolis, Alabama
- Coordinates: 32°31′13″N 87°50′25″W
- Built: 1832
- Architectural style: Federal, Greek Revival
- NRHP reference No.: 70000105
- Added to NRHP: July 28, 1970

Bluff Hall is a historic residence in Demopolis, Alabama, United States. The original portion of the house is in the Federal style with later additions that altered it to the Greek Revival style. It was documented as part of the Historic American Buildings Survey in 1936, and added to the National Register of Historic Places in 1970. It serves as a historic house museum, with the interior restored to an 1850s appearance.

== History ==
The house was built in 1832 by Allen Glover for his daughter, Sarah Serena Glover, and her husband, Francis Strother Lyon. The house was built by slaves. The Lyons used Bluff Hall as a townhouse; they also owned several outlying plantations. Bluff Hall was one of several homes built atop a limestone cliff overlooking the Tombigbee River, known as White Bluff, on land that Francis Lyon had purchased a few years earlier from the town commissioners of Demopolis.

The house was altered in the 1840s with the addition of the two-story front portico and a large rear wing. The new rear wing contained the dining room and kitchen at ground level and two bedrooms on the second floor. This new construction also added the other Greek Revival details.

The house remained in the Lyon family until 30 October 1907 when it was sold to A. R. Smith. The Smith family maintained it as a residence into the 1940s, though the upper floors were converted to apartments. The house was sold again in 1948 and continued as apartments. The Marengo County Historical Society purchased the house on 22 March 1967 in order to restore and convert it to a historic house museum.

== Description ==
The house is a two-story brick structure, with portions covered by smooth stucco. The front portico features six two-story square columns, constructed in brick with a stucco finish. These columns are very similar to nearby Lyon Hall. The balcony under the portico spans the width of the entrance doors and is supported by wrought iron brackets. The double parlor in the interior features two columns that were an anniversary gift to the Lyons from the Whitfield family. The Whitfields lived nearby at Gaineswood.

== Gallery ==
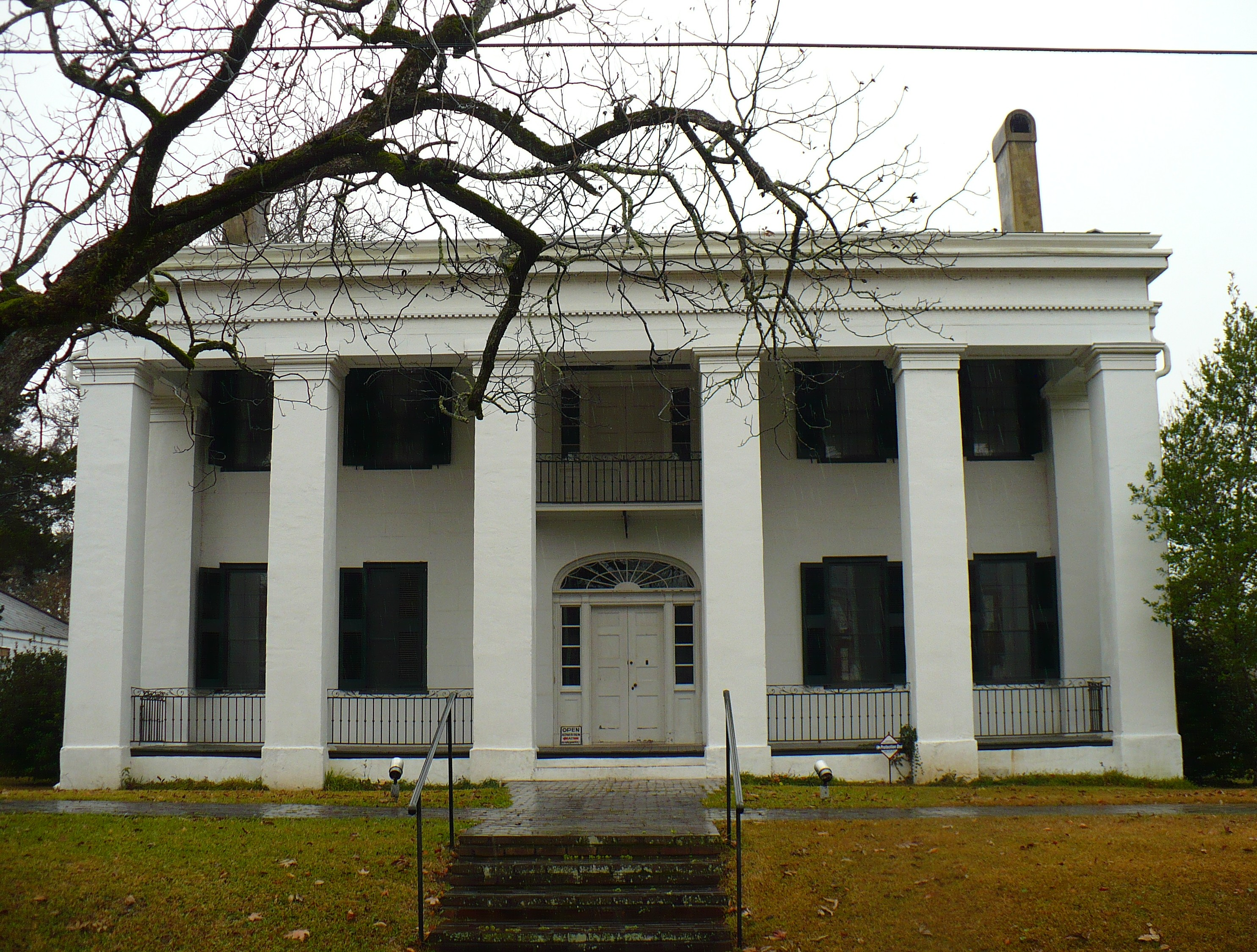
The front facade in 2008

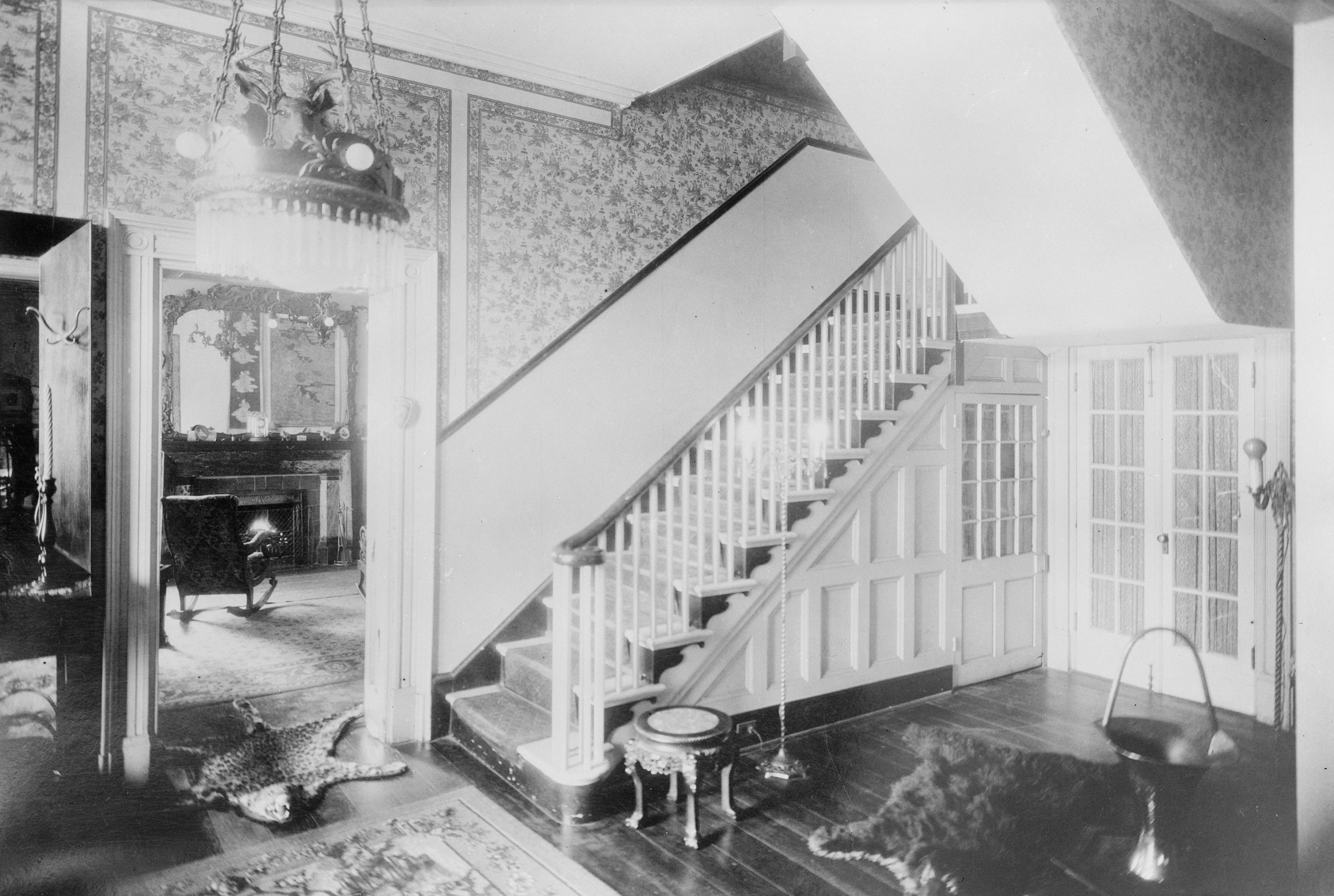
Entrance hall in 1935

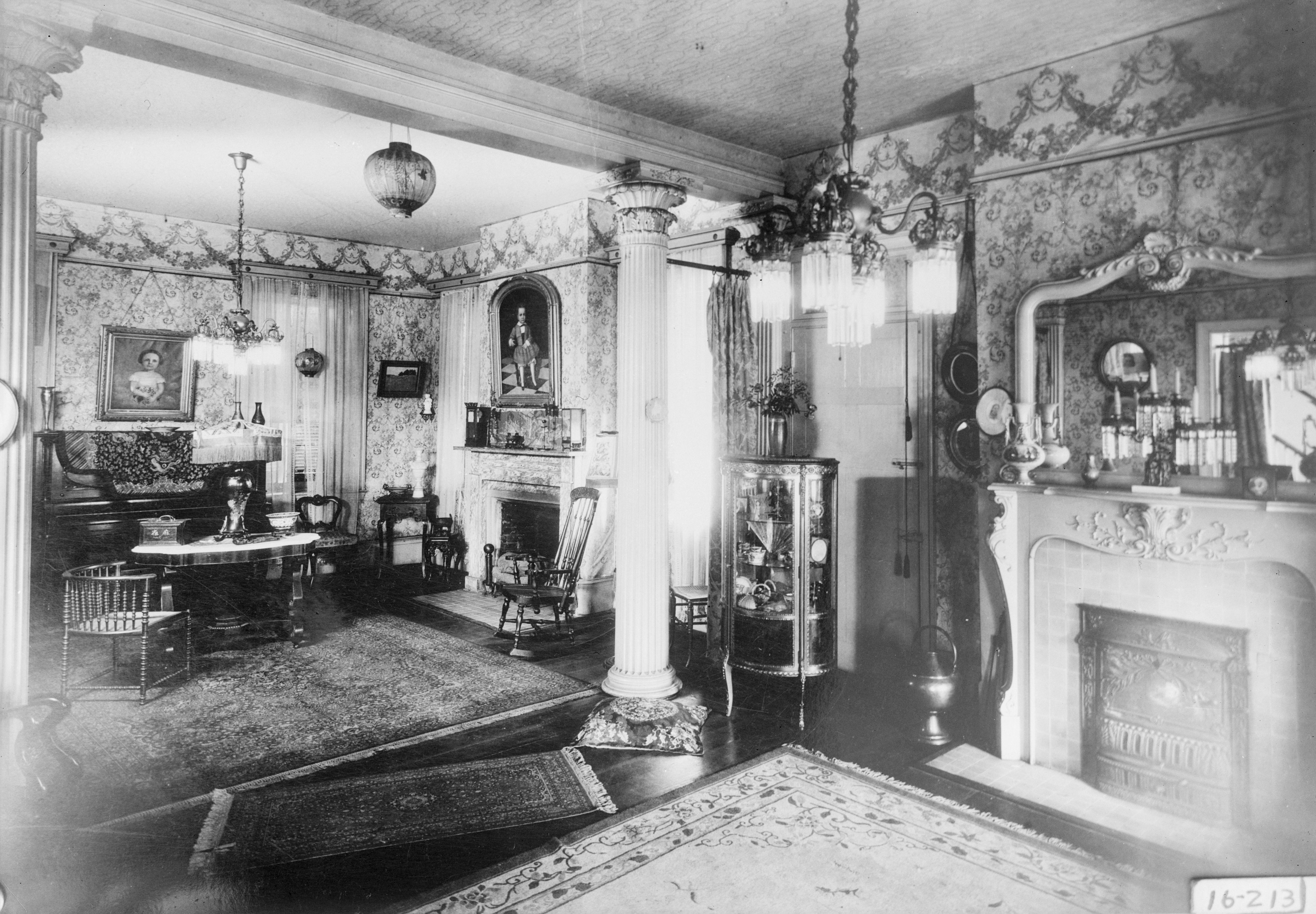
Parlor in 1935

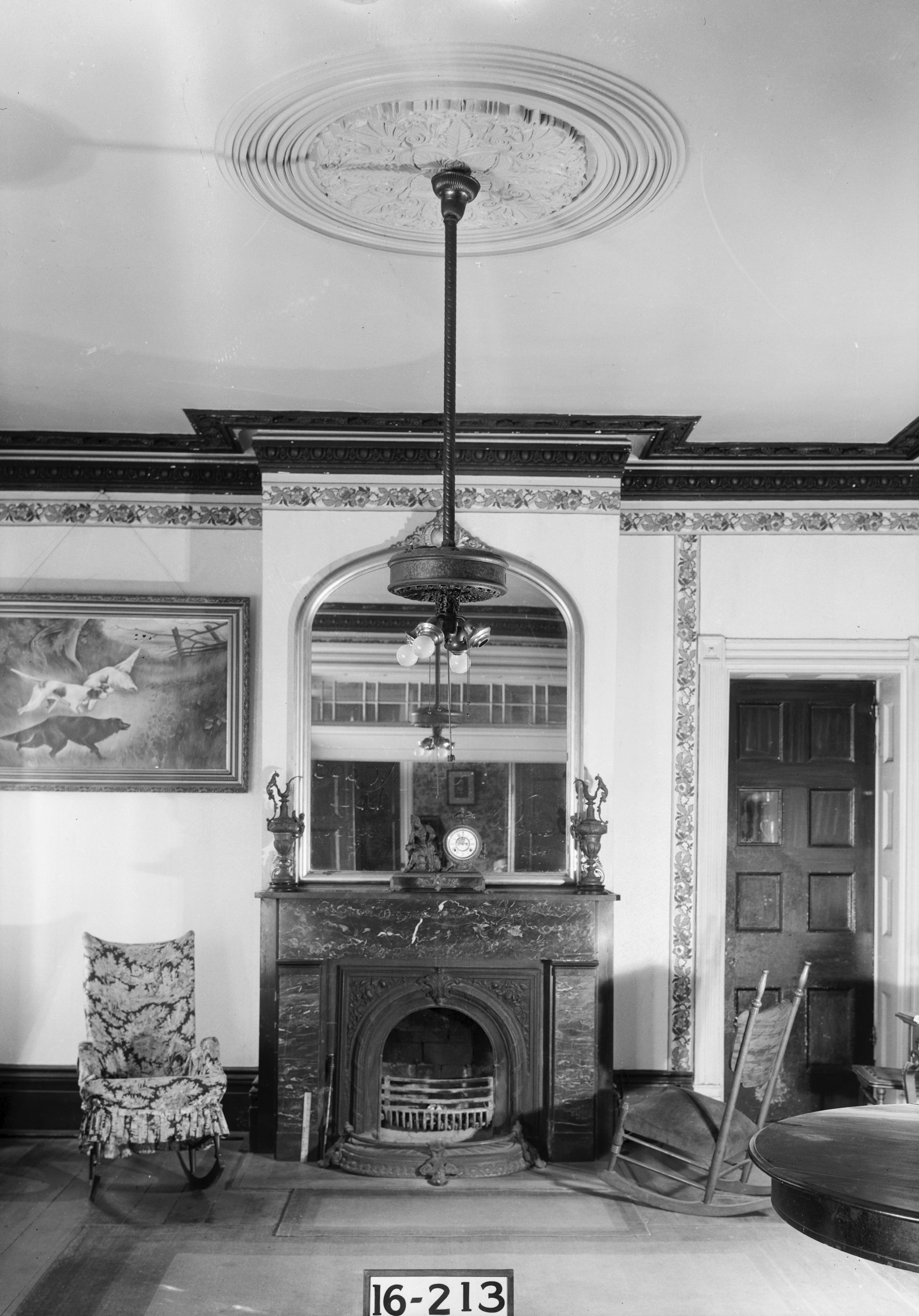
Dining room in 1935

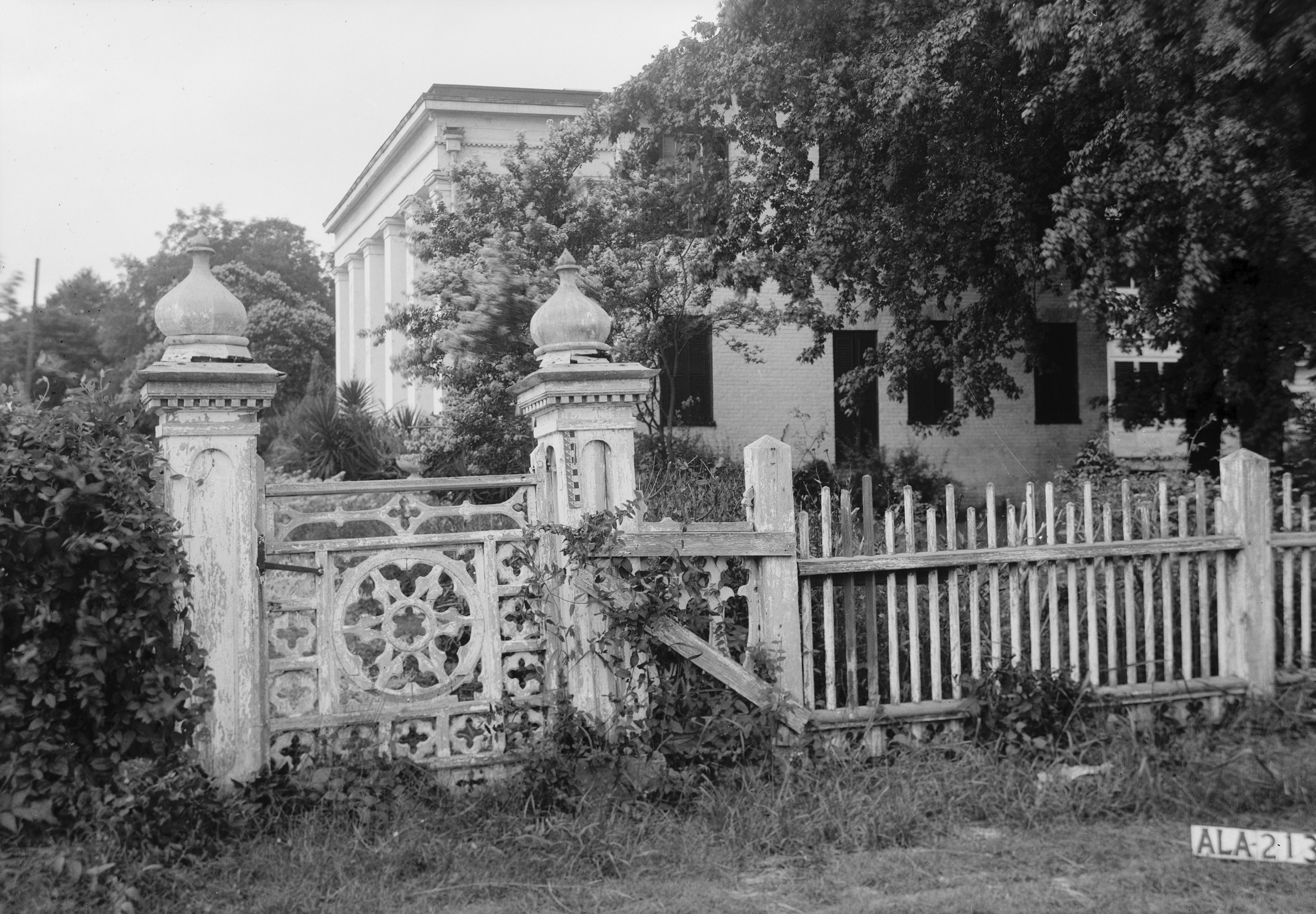
Gate and east elevation in 1935
