= Lyon Hall (Demopolis, Alabama) =

Historic house in Alabama, United States

- Lyon-Lamar House
- U.S. National Register of Historic Places
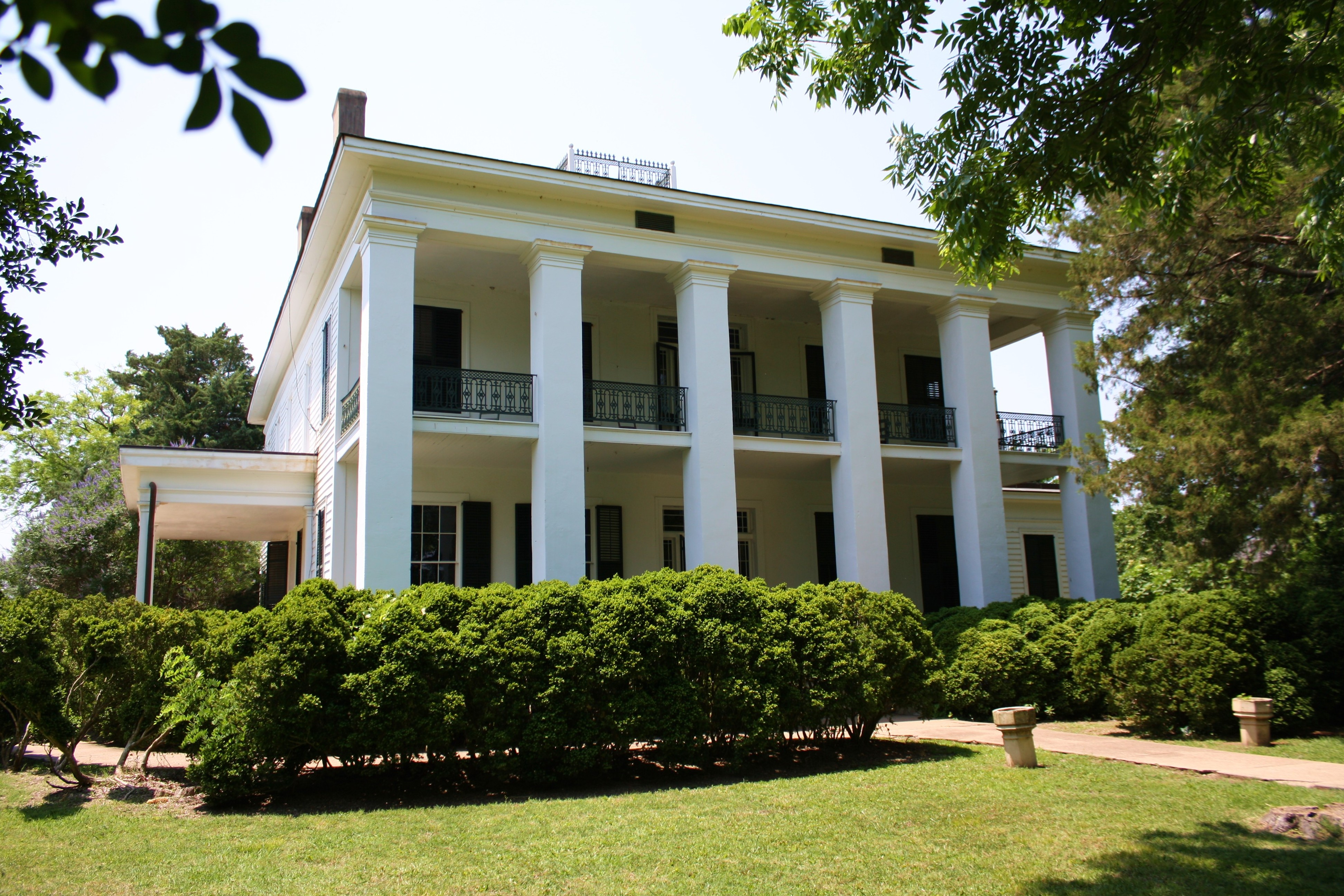
- Lyon Hall in 2011

- Location within Alabama Location within the United States
- Location: 102 South Main Avenue; Demopolis, Alabama
- Coordinates: 32°30′56.70″N 87°50′21.20″W
- Area: less than one acre
- Built: 1853
- Architectural style: Greek Revival
- NRHP reference No.: 74000425
- Added to NRHP: January 21, 1974

Lyon Hall, also known as the Lyon-Lamar House, is a historic Greek Revival mansion in Demopolis, Alabama, United States. It was built over a period of three years by George Gaines Lyon and his wife, Anne Glover Lyon. Lyon was an attorney and the nephew of Francis Strother Lyon, who maintained a residence nearby at Bluff Hall.

== History ==
George Lyon began construction on the house in 1850, it would continue until 1853. Upon completion of the house, they traveled to New York City to furnish it. Lyon descendants lived in the house until the death of George Gaines Lyon Lamar in 1996. The house was donated to the Marengo County Historical Society in May 1997.

== Description ==
The house is a two-story wooden frame structure, sided with clapboard. The front portico features six two-story square columns, constructed in brick with a stucco finish. These columns are very similar to Bluff Hall. The upper balcony spans the entire width of the house and is attached to the columns. The roof is hipped and features a small belvedere at the summit.
