= Demopolis Historic Business District =

Historic district in Alabama, United States

- U.S. National Register of Historic Places
- U.S. Historic district
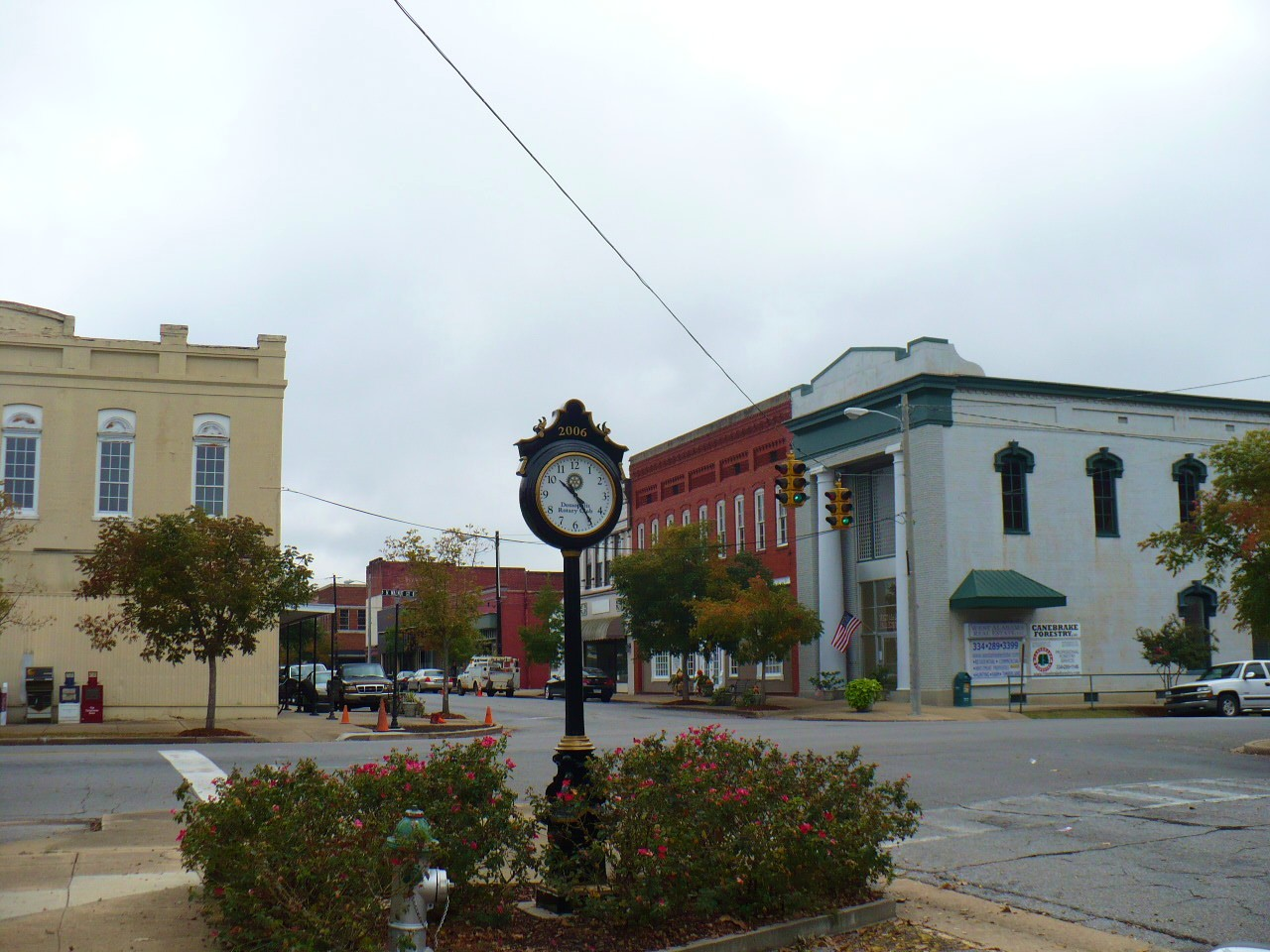
- View toward the east down Washington Street

- Location within Alabama Location within the United States
- Location: Demopolis, Alabama, United States
- Coordinates: 32°31′2″N 87°50′17″W
- Built: 1850-1949
- NRHP reference No.: 79000391
- Added to NRHP: November 25, 1979

The Demopolis Historic Business District, currently officially known as Demopolis Historic District, is a historic district in the city of Demopolis, Alabama, United States. Demopolis had its beginnings in 1817 with the Vine and Olive Colony. The historic district is a ten block area, roughly bounded by Capitol Street, Franklin Street, Desnouettes Street, and Cedar Avenue.

The district boundaries were increased, and name was changed to the actual one in October 2014.
