= Francis S. Lyon =

American politician and lawyer

Francis Strother Lyon
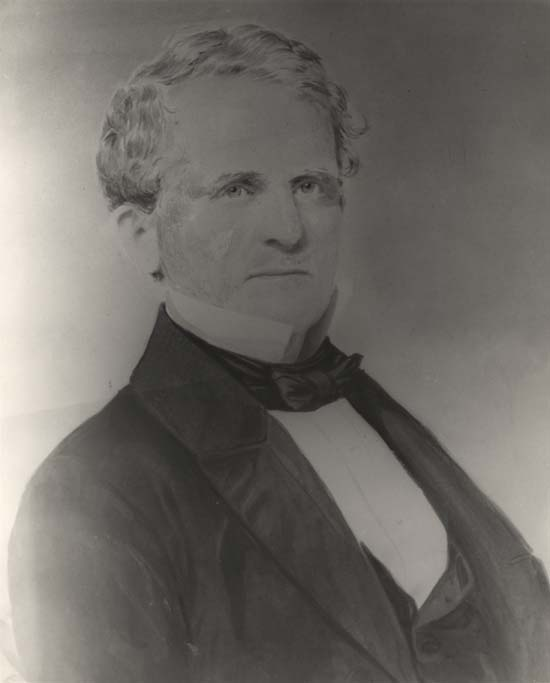
- Antebellum daguerreotype of Francis Strother Lyon

Member of the U.S. House of Representatives from Alabama's 5th district
- In office March 4, 1835 – March 3, 1839
- Preceded by: John Murphy
- Succeeded by: James Dellet

Personal details
- Born: February 25, 1800 Stokes County, North Carolina
- Died: December 31, 1882 (aged 82) Marengo County, Alabama
- Party: Whig
- Other political affiliations: Anti-Jacksonian (before 1837)
- Occupation: Attorney, Planter, Politician

Francis Strother Lyon (February 25, 1800 – December 31, 1882) was an Alabama attorney and politician. He served two terms in the Confederate States Congress during the American Civil War after being an antebellum member of the United States Congress.

== Family life ==
Lyon was born in Stokes County, North Carolina. His parents, James Lyon and Behetheland Gaines Lyon, owned a large tobacco plantation. They had four other children. He was a nephew of General Edmund Pendleton Gaines and Col. George Strother Gaines.

He married Sarah Serena in 1824. They had seven children. Their primary residence was at Bluff Hall in Demopolis. They also owned a plantation nearby at Bermuda Hill. Both are now historic house museums.

== Slavery ==
Lyon passionately advocated to keep slavery legal. He enslaved several people, including Abe and Eliza Lyon.

== Law and Political Career ==
Lyon moved to Marengo County, Alabama, in 1817 to live with his uncle George Gaines and was admitted to the bar in 1821. Lyon was secretary of the State Senate from 1822 to 1830, and then served in the Alabama State Senate from 1833 to 1834. He represented Alabama's Fifth District in the United States House of Representatives from 1835 to 1839—first as a Republican, then as a Whig. From 1845 to 1853, Lyon served as a commissioner in charge of administering the bankrupt state banking system.

He became the chairperson of the Alabama Democratic Party in 1860, using his campaign speech to talk about his support for slavery. When Abraham Lincoln was elected, Lyon called for Alabama to secede from the United States. He was elected to the Alabama State House of Representatives in 1861. Lyon then represented Alabama in the First Confederate Congress and the Second Confederate Congress from 1862 to 1865.

He wrote the Alabama state constitution adopted at the Constitutional Convention in 1875. It lowered taxes, reduced spending on public services including education, and prevented illiterate voters from receiving support in accessing ballots. He was elected to the State Senate in 1876, and served one term before retiring.

== Postbellum ==
Following the collapse of the Confederacy in the spring of 1865, Lyon eventually returned home and resumed his legal career. He had lost much of his wealth during the war by investing in Confederate bonds. Lyon died in Demopolis, Alabama, and was buried there in Riverside Cemetery's Glover Mausoleum.

His daughter, Ida Ashe Lyon (1845–1912), married physician William Mecklenburg Polk, and was the mother of Frank Polk, who served as counselor to the Department of State through World War One and later became the first US Under Secretary of State.

U.S. House of Representatives
Preceded by John Murphy	Member of the U.S. House of Representatives from Alabama's 5th congressional district 1835-1839	Succeeded by James Dellet
