= Temple B'nai Jeshurun (Demopolis, Alabama) =

Place of worship in Alabama

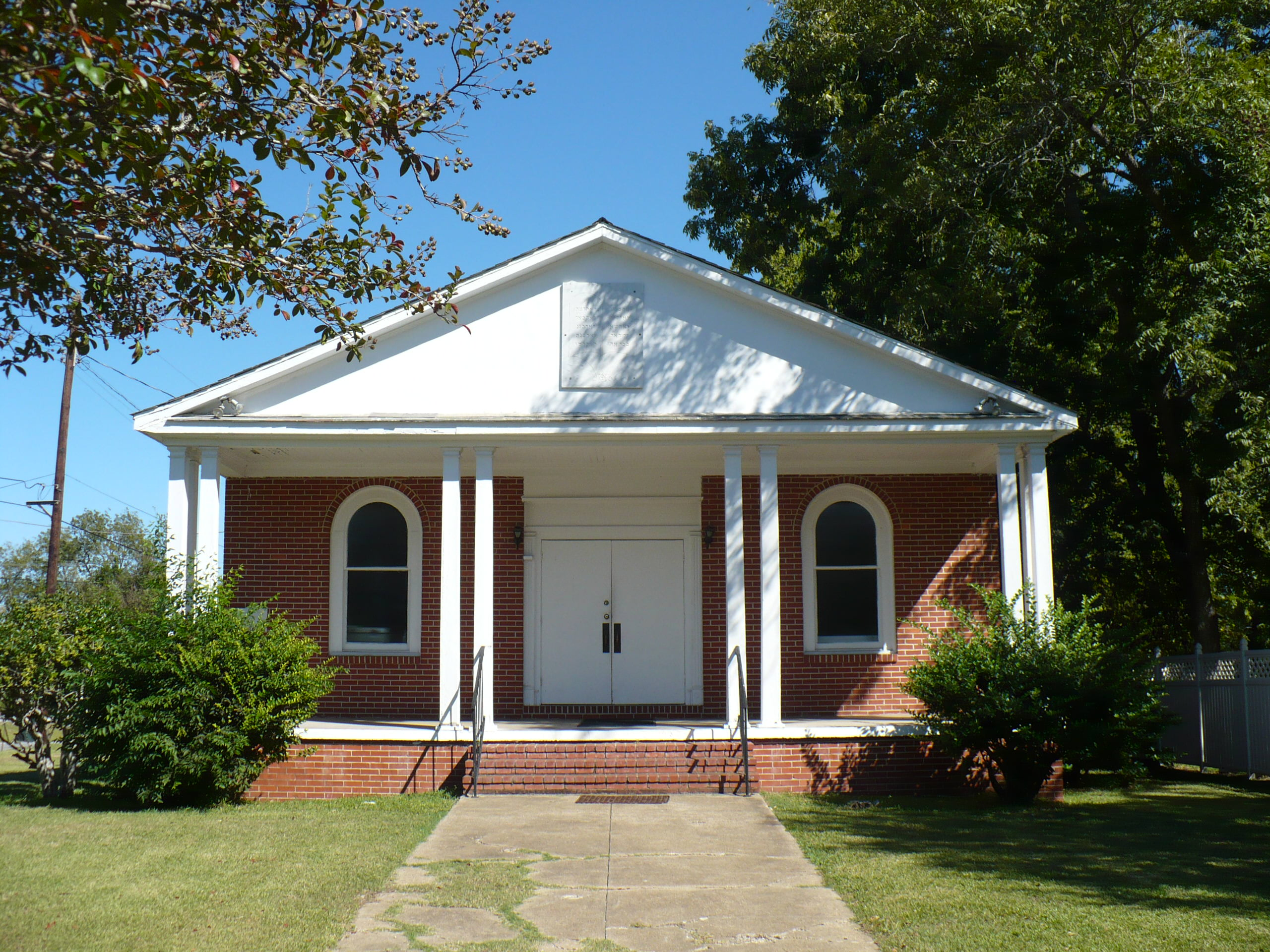
- The former synagogue in 2010

- Location of the former synagogue in Alabama

Religion
- Affiliation: Reform Judaism (former)
- Ecclesiastical or organizational status: Synagogue (1893–1989); Church (since 1989)
- Status: Inactive (as a synagogue)

Location
- Location: 406 North Main Avenue, Demopolis, Alabama
- Country: United States
- Interactive map of Temple B'nai Jeshurun
- Coordinates: 32°31′13″N 87°50′18″W

Architecture
- Type: Synagogue architecture
- Style: Moorish Revival (1893); Classical Revival (1958)

Temple B'nai Jeshurun is a former Jewish congregation and synagogue located in Demopolis, Alabama, in the United States. Established in 1858, making it the fourth oldest Jewish congregation in Alabama. It was active throughout the latter half of the 19th century and most of the 20th century.

The original temple was built in 1893. It was demolished after a new smaller building was built inside the older structure in 1958. The temple had become inactive by the 1980s, and the building was transferred to a local church in 1989.

== History ==
The first Jewish settler to arrive in Demopolis was Isaac Marx in circa 1844. Originally from Bavaria, the businessman established what eventually became the Marx Banking Company. He encouraged other Jewish families living further east to relocate to the city. By the 1850s, the Jewish community ran many of the commercial enterprises in the city. In 1858 they formed the B'nai Jeshurun (children of righteousness) congregation. Initially the congregation met in homes and businesses. The congregation bought land for a cemetery on East Jefferson Street in 1878. By the 1890s the congregation was able to build a temple on the corner of Main and Monroe streets. It was dedicated on November 30, 1893, with Rabbi Edward Levy of Selma officiating. Isaac Marx, the oldest congregant in 1893, lit the eternal light. The new wooden-frame temple was built in a Moorish Revival style with a domed roof.

The congregation never had its own rabbi; the services were led by lay readers instead. The lay readers included Jacob Bley, George Bley, Jerome Levy, and Louis Mayer. The Jewish community played an active role in civic affairs, with three congregation members serving as mayors of Demopolis: Morris Ely (1903–1906), Isidore Bley (1910), and Bony Fields (1949–1952). The progenitor of the Rosenbush family, Julius Rosenbush, arrived in the city in 1894. He founded the Rosenbush Furniture Company, a locally prominent business for 108 years, until its closing in 2002.

The congregation joined the Union of American Hebrew Congregations in 1907. By 1905, Demopolis had a population of around 124 Jews. In 1929 it had increased to 150. By the late 1930s, as was happening in other small Southern towns, the Jewish population had started an exodus to larger cities, with only 90 people remaining. A new, smaller masonry temple was built inside the shell of the 1893 building in 1958. The old temple was demolished after the new one was completed. The Jewish population continued to decline, with only a handful of people remaining by the late 1980s. The deed to Temple B’nai Jeshurun was signed over to Trinity Episcopal Church for US$10 in 1989. The church continued to care for the property in 2010, having donated the sanctuary artifacts to the Goldring / Woldenberg Institute of Southern Jewish Life|Museum of the Southern Jewish Experience in 2007. Bert Rosenbush Jr, grandson of Julius Rosenbush and the last remaining former B'nai Jeshurun congregant, died on January 10, 2019, at the age of 89.
