= White Bluff (Demopolis, Alabama) =

- U.S. National Register of Historic Places
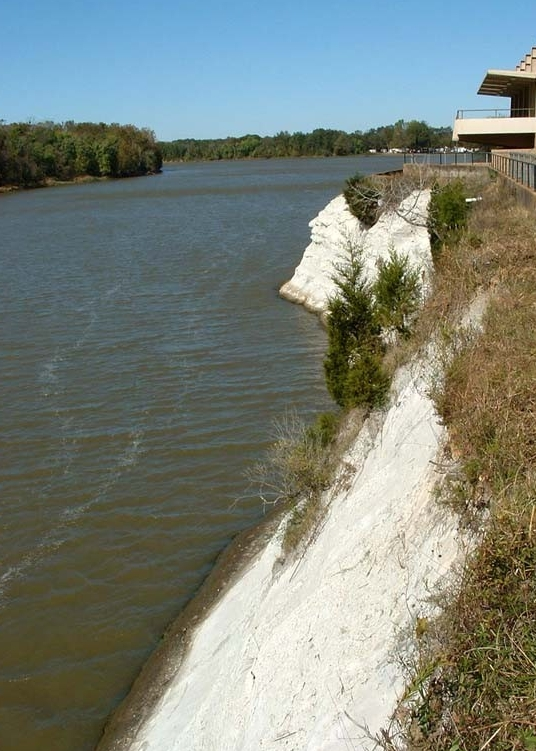
- White Bluff, below the Demopolis Civic Center.

- Location within Alabama Location within the United States
- Location: Arch Street, Demopolis, Alabama
- Coordinates: 32°31′10.38″N 87°50′30.43″W
- Area: 6 acres (2.4 ha)
- Built: 1817
- NRHP reference No.: 70000106
- Added to NRHP: August 25, 1970

White Bluff, also known as Ecor Blanc, is a historic site located along the Tombigbee River in Demopolis, Alabama. It is a chalk cliff, roughly one mile long, that is composed of a geological layer known as the Demopolis Chalk Formation, part of the Selma Group. The upper portions of the cliff stood almost 80 feet (24 m) above the river before the construction of the Demopolis Lock and Dam downriver. It now averages about 30 feet (9.1 m) above the river.

White Bluff was first named Ecor Blanc by 18th century French explorers and map makers. It also became known as the Chickasaw Gallery because early Native American inhabitants harnessed their boats at the foot of the cliff. It was the site where French Bonapartist refugees landed in 1817 and established their Vine and Olive Colony. White Bluff is the site for the main event of the annual Christmas on the River festival.
