= Glover Mausoleum =

Historic place in Marengo County, Alabama

- U.S. National Register of Historic Places
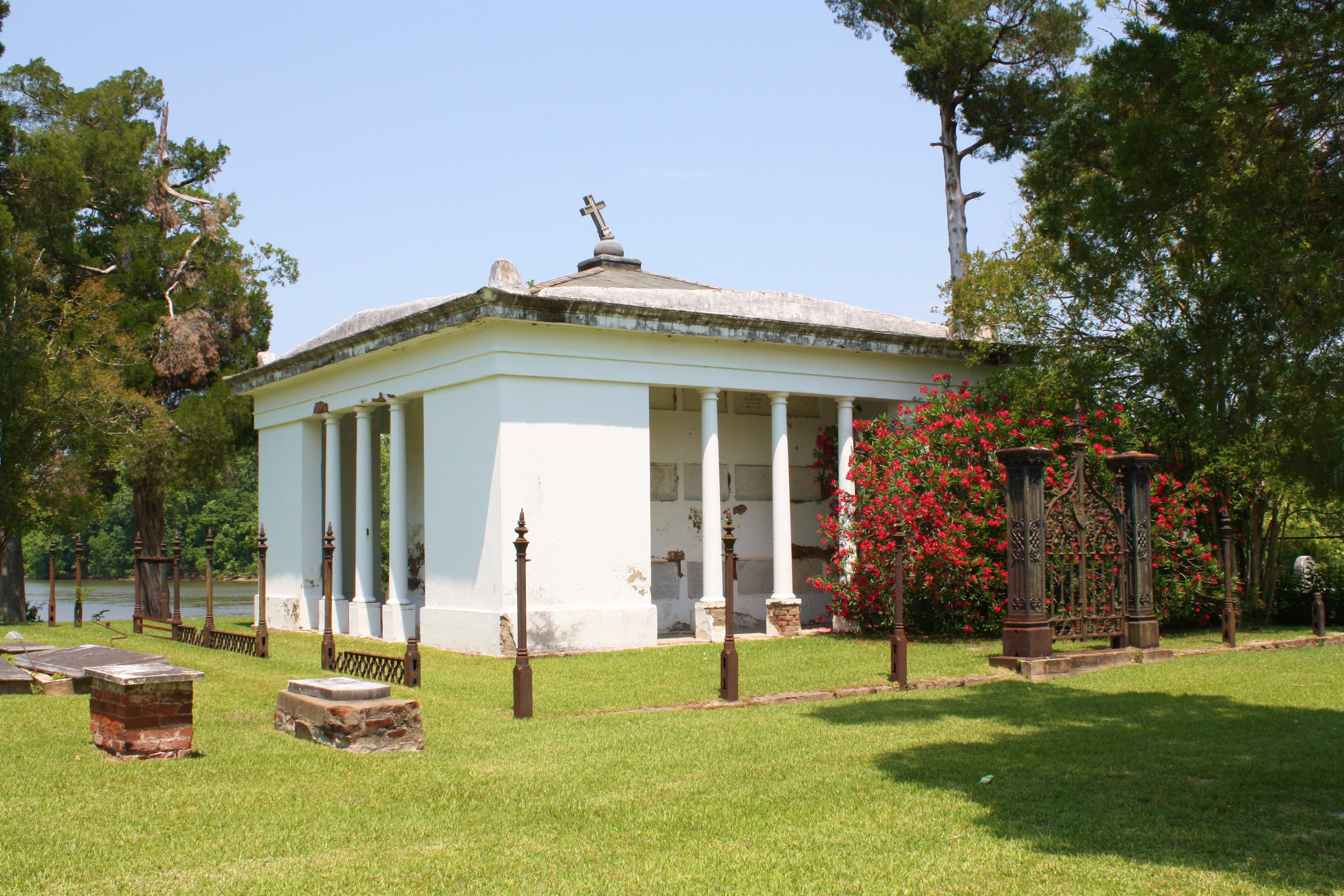
- The mausoleum and Tombigbee River in 2011
- Location: Riverside Cemetery; Demopolis, Alabama, United States
- Coordinates: 32°30′54.73″N 87°50′57.43″W
- Area: less than one acre
- Built: 1845
- Architectural style: Greek Revival
- NRHP reference No.: 74000424
- Added to NRHP: January 21, 1974

The Glover Mausoleum, also known as the Glover Vault, is a Greek Revival mausoleum located within the Riverside Cemetery in Demopolis, Alabama. It houses the remains of local plantation owner, Allen Glover, his first wife Sarah (nee Norwood), second wife Mary Ann (nee Devin) and his daughter Mary Amelia Thornton, along with many of their descendants.

== History ==
The Greek Revival mausoleum was built between 1841 and 1845 on a chalk bluff overlooking the Tombigbee River, southwest of Demopolis. It was built by Mary Anne Glover, second wife of Allen Glover, on land purchased by him in 1831 and left to his minor daughter, Ann Gaines Glover. Allen Glover died in 1840 and was initially buried elsewhere. Records in the Probate Court of Marengo County show that expenditures on the vault began in January 1841. By the time that it was finished the executors of Allen Glover's estate had spent at least $2,136.75 on construction. The bodies of Allen Glover, his first wife, and a daughter were moved to the vaults after it was completed in 1845. A Gothic Revival cast iron fence was later added around the vault in 1858. Ann Glover allowed other family members to be buried around the mausoleum in later years, and in 1882 she began to sell lots to the public. This led to the establishment of the site as Riverside Cemetery. The fence has experienced considerable vandalism in more recent years and has been largely removed. The mausoleum was placed on the National Register of Historic Places in 1974.

== Description ==
The mausoleum contains burial vaults for thirty people. There are fifteen vaults on the east and west sides, stacked five horizontally and three vertically. It is a square brick structure, plastered over with smooth stucco and scored to give the appearance of ashlar. A porch surrounds the vaults on all four sides, with solid masonry corners and openings on each side supported by a span of three cast iron columns. The low-pitched masonry roof is topped by a granite orb and cross.

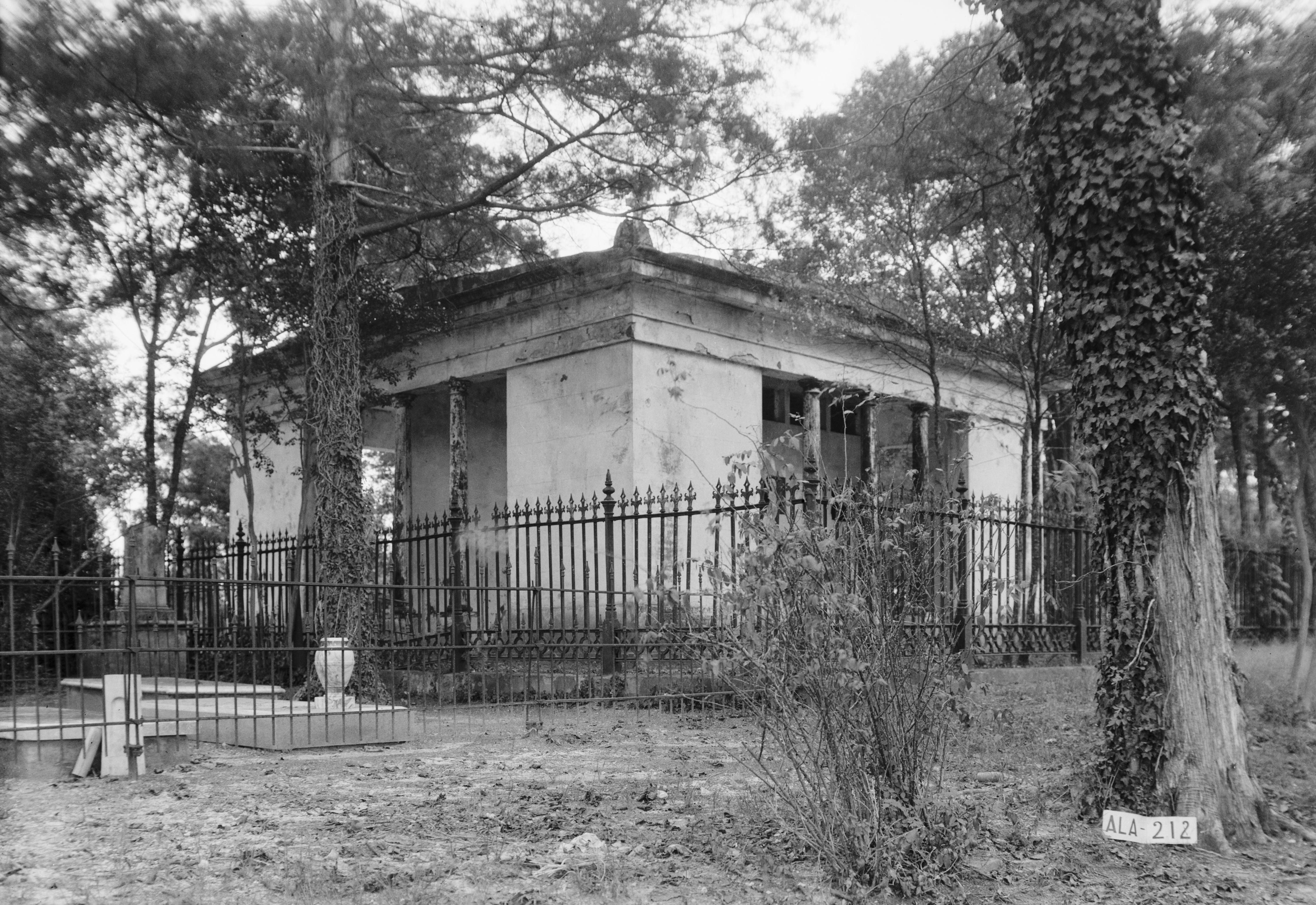
The mausoleum in 1934.

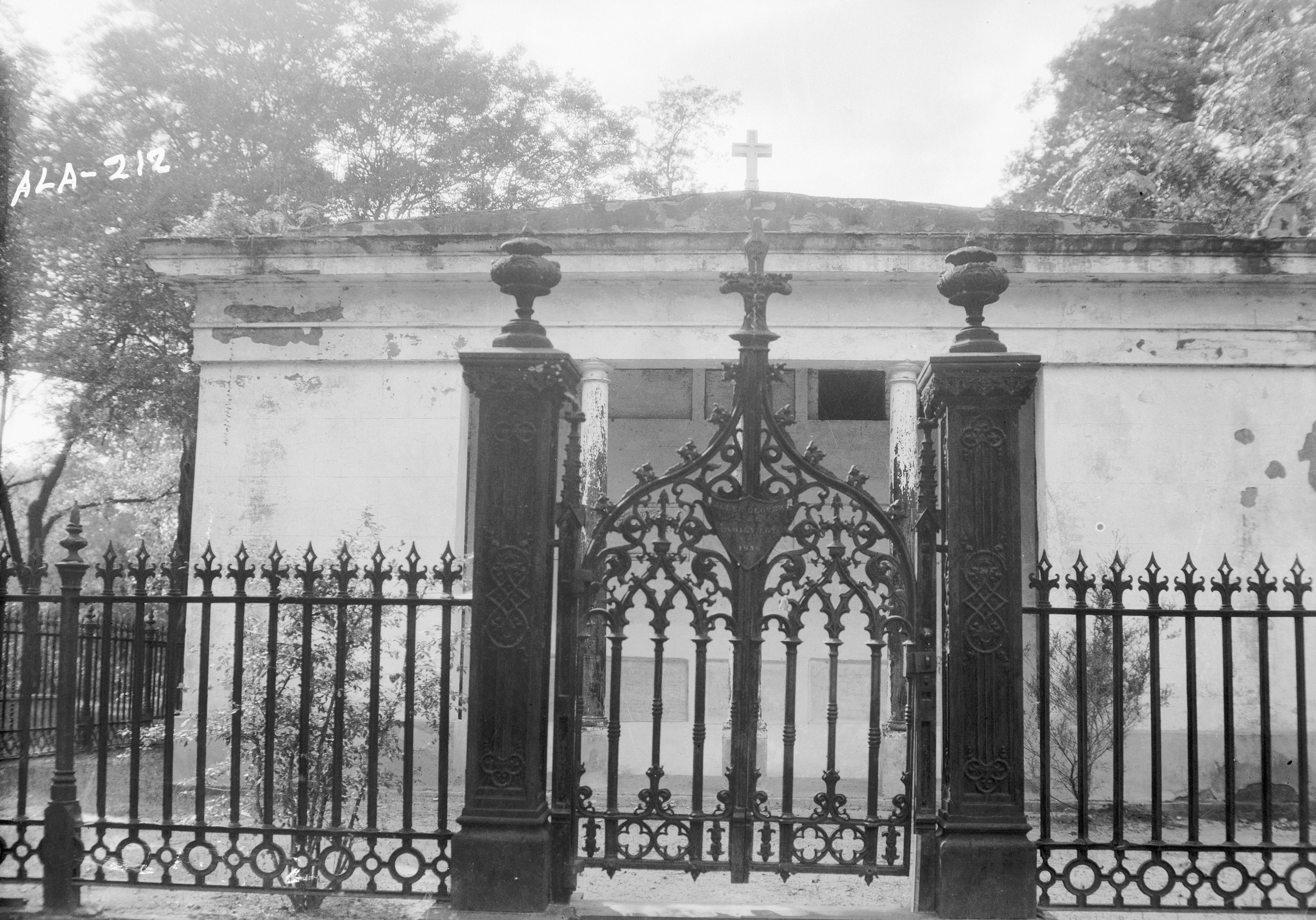
Entrance gate and fence in 1934.

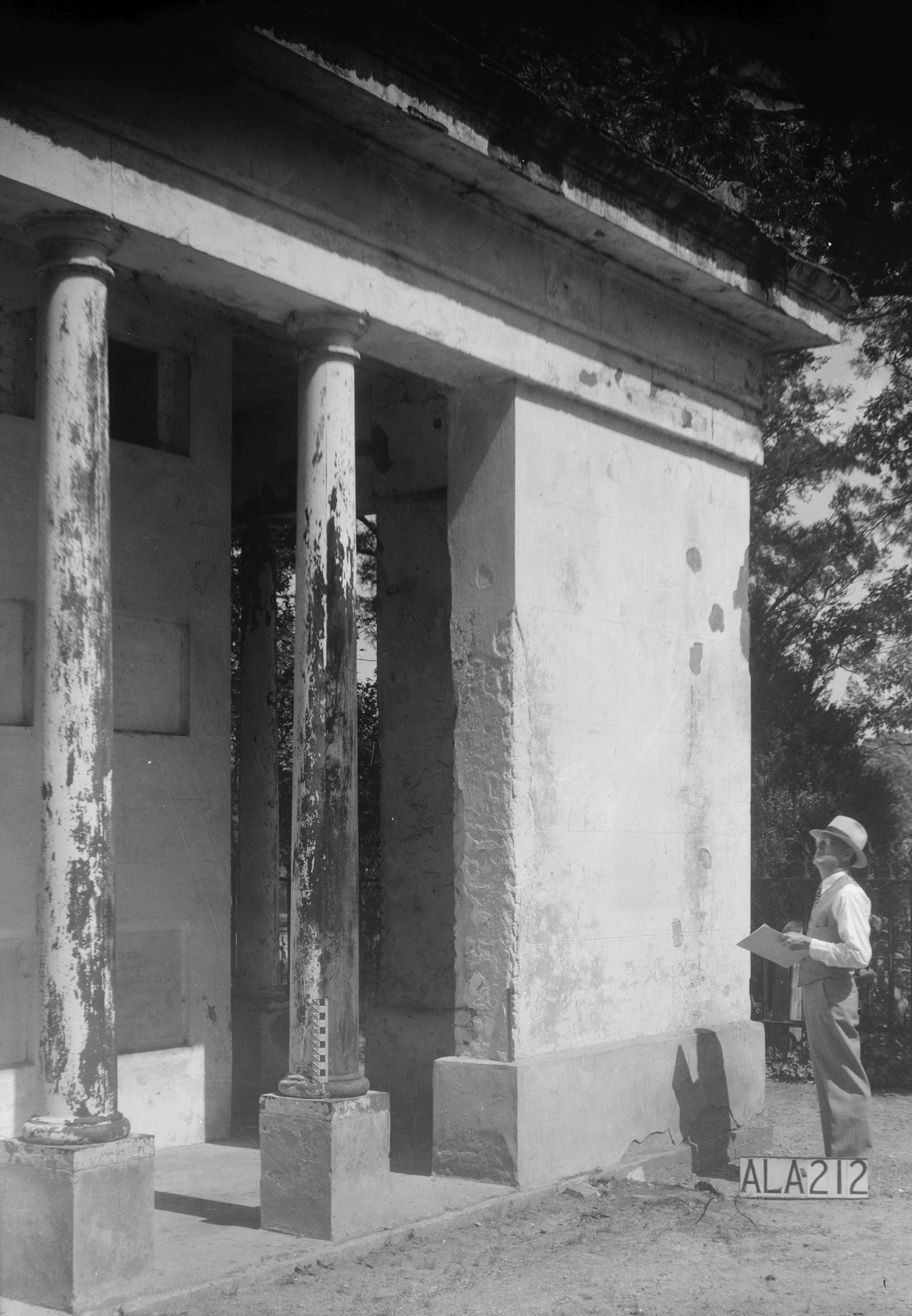
Columns on the east side in 1936.

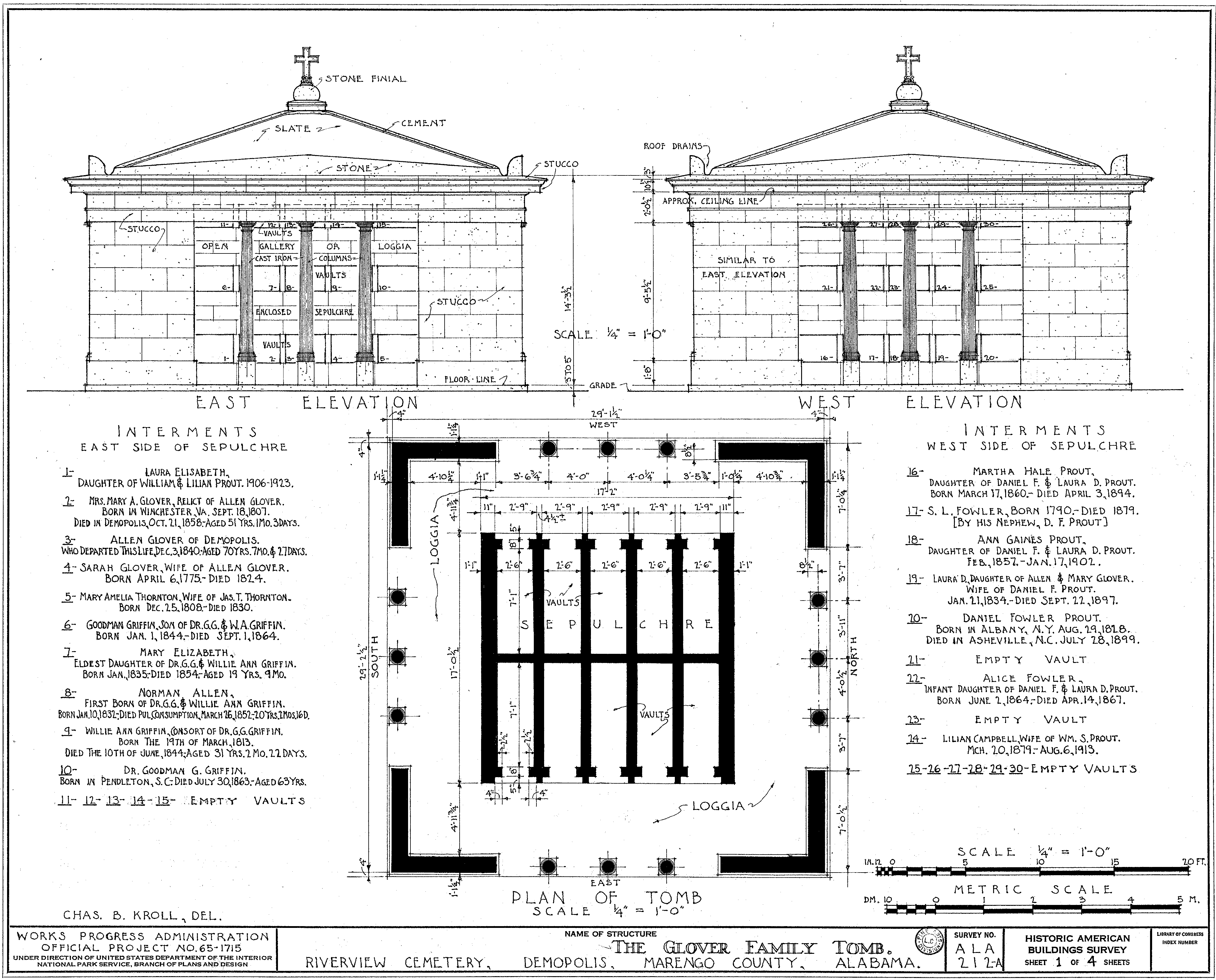
Plan of the mausoleum.

== See also ==
- Rosemount (Forkland, Alabama), the only surviving Glover home in the area, also listed on the NRHP
