= Demopolis City School District =

School district in Alabama

Address
- 609 South Cedar Avenue Demopolis, Alabama; United States
- Coordinates: 32.50951°N 87.83407°W

District information
- Grades: K–12
- Superintendent: Dr. Bobby Hathcock (interim)
- School board: Demopolis Board of Education
- Accreditation(s): Southern Association of Colleges and Schools
- Schools: 4
- NCES District ID: 0101200

Students and staff
- Students: 2,335
- Faculty: 154.00 (on FTE basis)
- Staff: 253.00 (on FTE basis)
- Student–teacher ratio: 15.16

Other information
- Website: dcsedu.com

The Demopolis City School District is the city school district for Demopolis in Marengo County, Alabama. It operates four schools within the city, which include U.S. Jones Elementary School, Westside Elementary School, Demopolis Middle School, and Demopolis High School. The system educates more than 2300 students and employs roughly 250.
