= Demopolis, Alabama =

City in Alabama, United States

- City
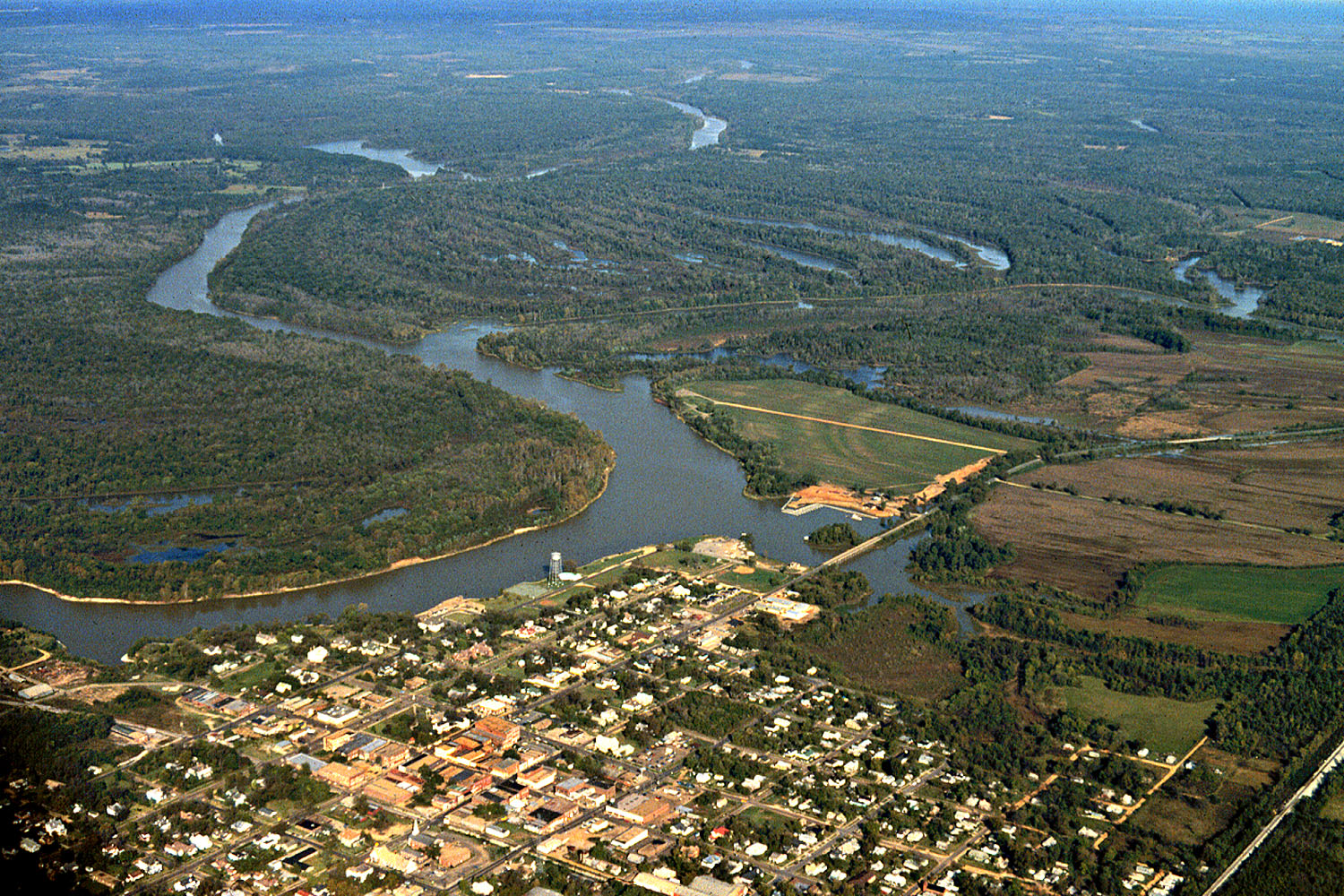
- Aerial view of Demopolis. The confluence of the Tombigbee and Black Warrior rivers is visible in the center of the picture. View is looking to the northwest.

- Logo
- Nicknames: City of the People, Jewel of the Black Belt, The River City, The Canebrake, Demop
- Location in Marengo County, Alabama
- Coordinates: 32°30′15″N 87°51′32″W
- Country: United States
- State: Alabama
- County: Marengo
- Incorporated: December 11, 1821

Area
  - Total: 18.066 sq mi (46.791 km^{2})
  - Land: 17.744 sq mi (45.956 km^{2})
  - Water: 0.322 sq mi (0.835 km^{2})
- Elevation: 157 ft (48 m)

Population (2020)
  - Total: 7,162
  - Estimate (2022): 6,882
  - Density: 388/sq mi (149.8/km^{2})
- Time zone: UTC−6 (Central (CST))
  - Summer (DST): UTC−5 (CDT)
- ZIP Code: 36732
- Area code: 334
- FIPS code: 01-20296
- GNIS feature ID: 2404214
- Website: demopolisal.gov

Demopolis is the largest city in Marengo County, in west-central Alabama. The population was 7,162 at the 2020 census.

The city lies at the confluence of the Black Warrior River and Tombigbee River. It is situated atop a cliff composed of the Demopolis Chalk Formation, known locally as White Bluff, on the east bank of the Tombigbee. It is at the center of Alabama's Canebrake region and is also within the Black Belt region.

Demopolis was founded in the early 1800s after the fall of Napoleon's empire. It was named by a group of French expatriates, a mix of exiled Bonapartists and other French refugees who had settled in the United States after the overthrow of the colonial government in Saint-Domingue by enslaved workers. Napoleon had sent troops there in a last attempt to regain control of the island, but they were defeated, largely by high mortality due to yellow fever.

The name, meaning in Greek "the People's City" or "City of the People" (from Ancient Greek δῆμος + πόλις), was chosen to honor the democratic ideals behind the endeavor. First settled in 1817, it is one of the oldest continuous settlements in the interior of Alabama. French colonists had founded Mobile on the coast in the early 18th century. Demopolis was incorporated on December 11, 1821.

== History ==
=== Colonization ===
Organizing first in Philadelphia, French expatriates petitioned the U.S. Congress to sell them property for land to colonize. Congress granted approval by an act on March 3, 1817, that allowed them to buy four townships in the Alabama Territory at $2 per acre, with the provision that they cultivate grape vines and olive trees. Following advice obtained from experienced pioneers and geographers, they estimated that Alabama would provide a good climate for cultivating these crops, which proved not to be the case. By July 14, 1817, a small party of pioneers had settled at White Bluff on the Tombigbee River, at the present site of Demopolis, founding the Vine and Olive Colony.

Among the wealthiest and most prominent of the group was Count Lefebvre Desnouettes, who had been a cavalry officer under Napoleon, with the rank of lieutenant-general. He had ridden in Napoleon's carriage during his failed invasion of Russia. Other prominent figures among the immigrants included Lieutenant-General Baron Henri-Dominique Lallemand, Count Bertrand Clauzel, Joseph Lakanal, Simon Chaudron, Pasqual Luciani, Colonel Jean-Jerome Cluis, Jean-Marie Chapron, Colonel Nicholas Raoul, and Frederic Ravesies. Most of these expatriates had little interest in pioneer life and sold their shares in the colony, remaining in Philadelphia. By 1818, the colony consisted of only 69 settlers.

The party encountered a variety of adversities. Following a survey in August 1818, they learned that their new properties did not fall under the territories encompassed by the congressional approval, and the Vine and Olive Colony was soon forced to move. Their actual land grants began less than a mile to the east of their newly cleared land. After abandoning the settlement of Demopolis, they soon established two other towns, Aigleville and Arcola.

=== American settlement ===
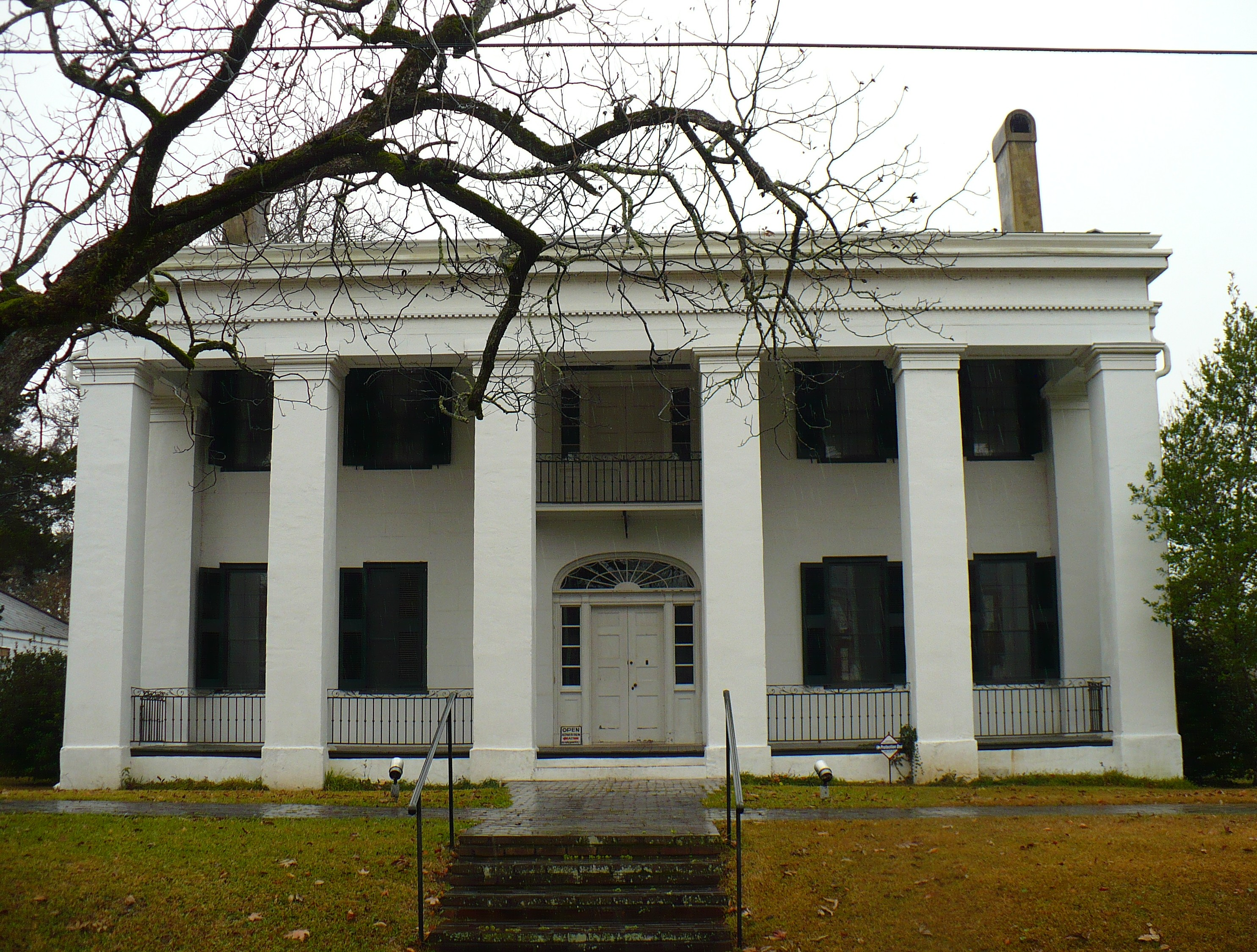
Bluff Hall in 2008

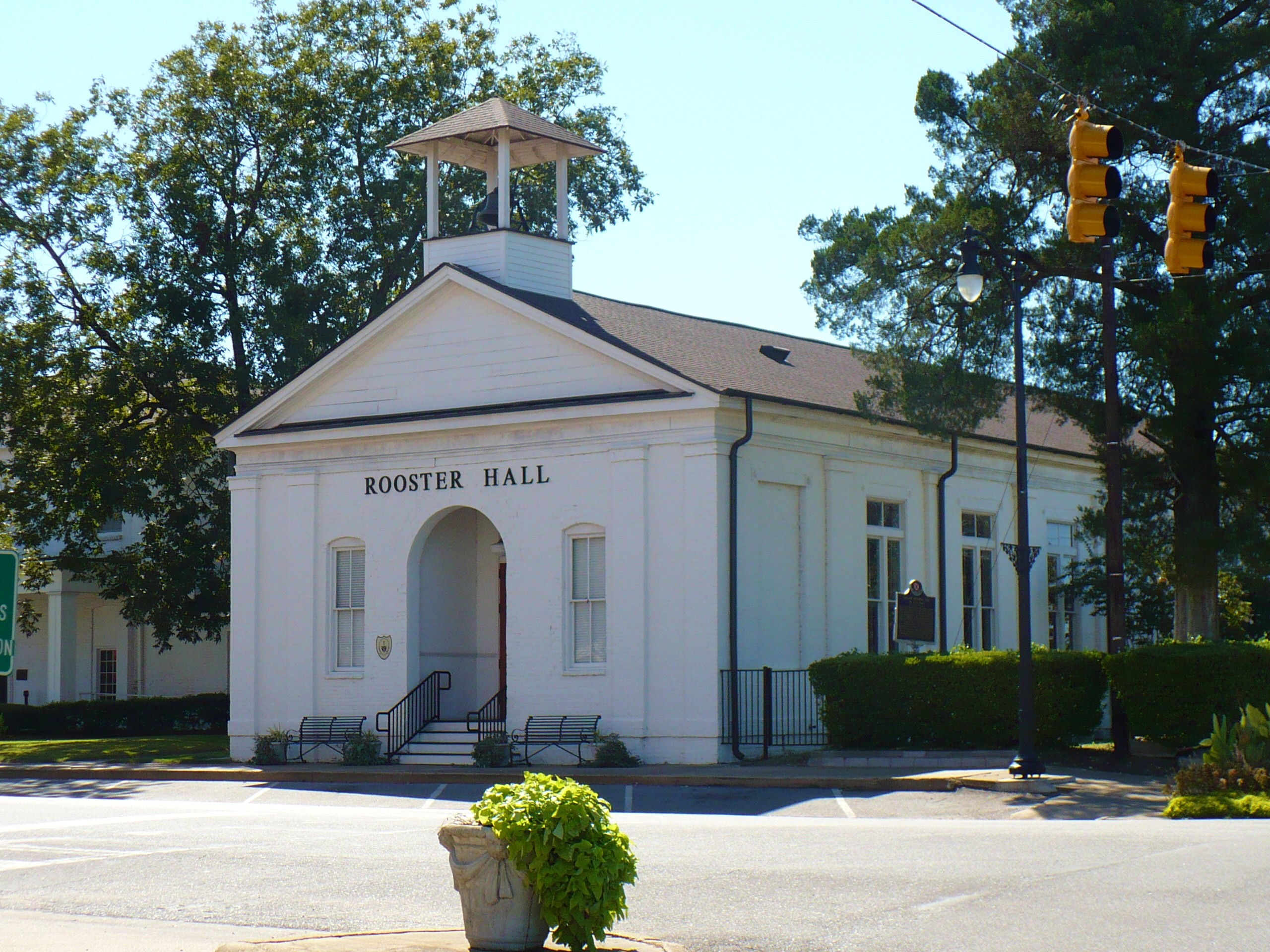
Rooster Hall in 2010. Built in 1843 as the Presbyterian church, it served as the county courthouse from 1868 to 1871.

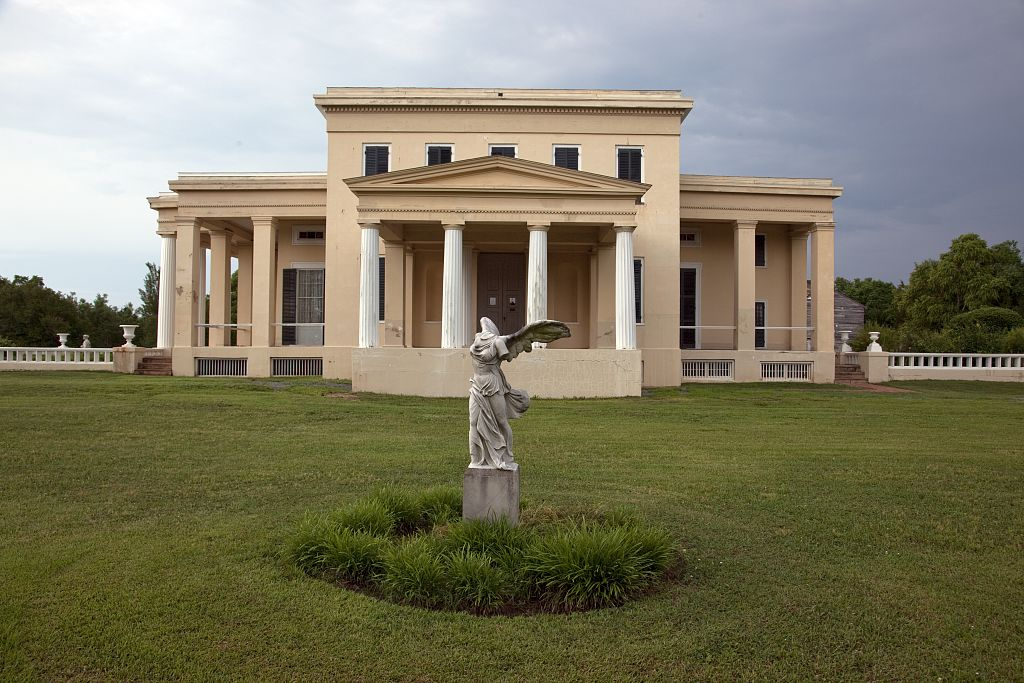
Nathan B. Whitfield's Gaineswood in 2010, built from 1843 to 1861 on what was then the outskirts of town.

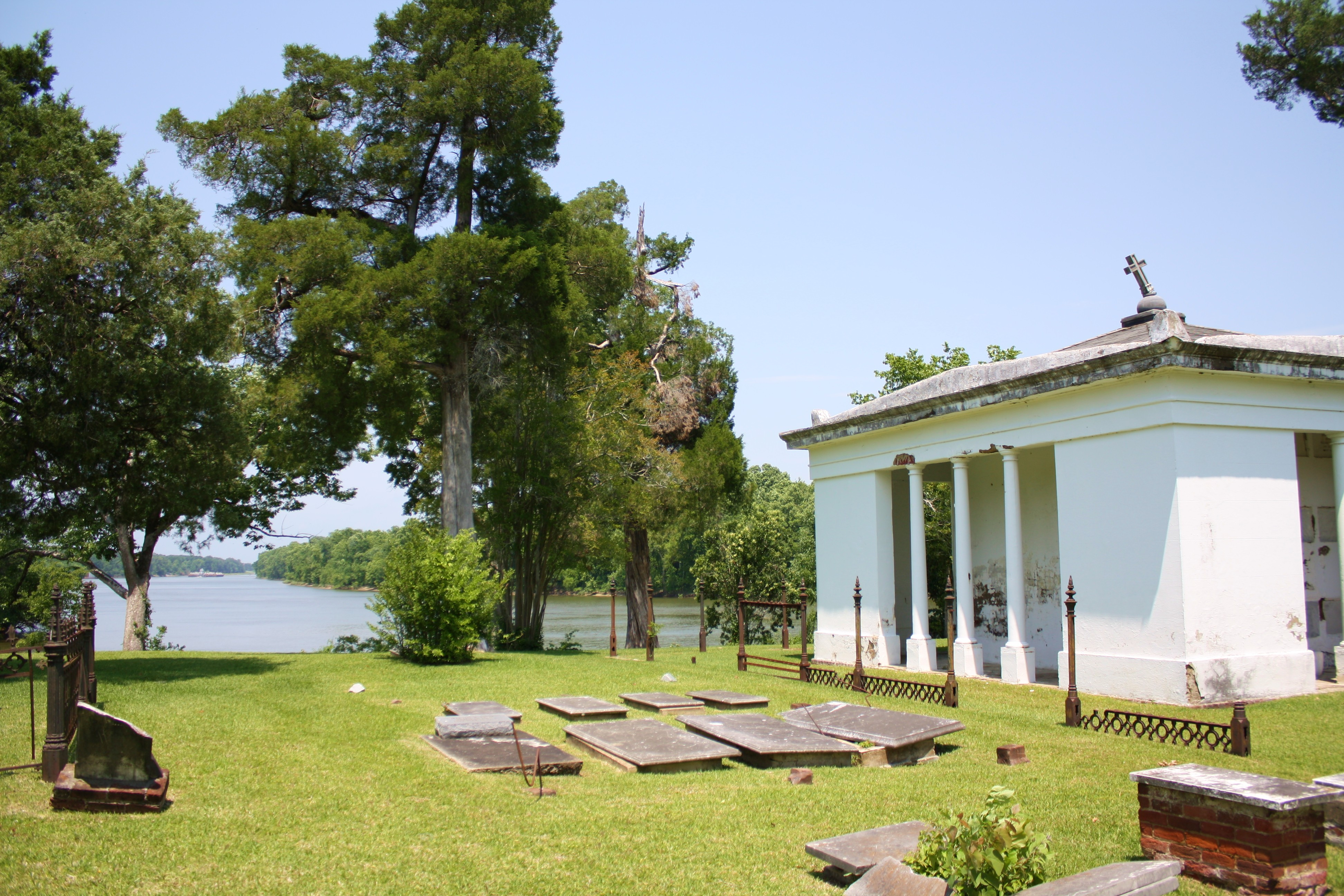
The Glover Mausoleum and a portion of Riverside Cemetery overlooking the Tombigbee River.

Upon learning of the survey and that the French grants lay elsewhere, American settlers began to quickly purchase the property of the former French settlement, intending to develop it as a major river port on the Tombigbee. A land company, the White Bluff Association (later renamed as the Company of the Town of Demopolis), was formed in 1819 with the express purpose to purchase the land and lay off a town. George Strother Gaines was named as the company spokesman, and he bought the town site atop White Bluff as soon as it was offered for sale. Commissioners for the company were George Strother Gaines, James Childress, Walter Crenshaw, Count Charles Lefebvre Desnouettes, and Dr. Joseph B. Earle.

The commissioners were responsible for overseeing the site survey, lot sales, and the early operations of the town. The commissioners laid off the site into streets, blocks, and lots, with a block of roughly two acres divided into eight lots. Demopolis Town Square, encompassing one city block, was established in 1819. The first lots were sold beginning on April 22, 1819. When Count Desnouettes died in 1822, Allen Glover was appointed to replace him. As other commissioners retired, they were succeeded by David E. Moore, William H. Lyon, Thomas McGee, and George N. Stewart.

The streets were laid off using a grid plan, with the city of Philadelphia as a model. The original streets running north–south were named for trees, such as Ash, Cedar, Cherry, and Chestnut. Exceptions were made for Commissioners, Strawberry, and Market (now Main) streets. Several short north–south streets were also named for commissioners, such as Desnouettes, Earle, Glover, Griffin, and McGee. The east–west streets were named for national and local heroes, as well as commissioners, such as Childress, Fulton, Gaines, Lyon, Monroe, Washington, Franklin, Jefferson, and Jackson. Most streets were designed to be 66 feet (20 m) wide. A strip of land that remained public property, for the use of all, was the land adjoining the Tombigbee River. This extended from where Riverside Cemetery is today, to the southwest of the city proper, to the Upper Landing in the north, with Arch Street following the route along the top of the cliff. Only the portion of Arch Street adjacent to the cemetery remains intact.

Some flaws and limitations of the original town plan became apparent by the late 1820s and 1830s. The typical town lots, at 75 feet (23 m) wide and 150 feet (46 m) deep, were not conducive to construction of the stately homes desired by the more prosperous residents. Some grand mansions were completed by the late 1820s. One of the first was the brick 2 1/2-story Federal-style Allen Glover house at the foot of Capitol Street. It was one of the, if not the first, neoclassical structures to be built in Marengo County. Glover built Bluff Hall (1832) for his daughter, Sarah Serena, and son-in-law, Francis Strother Lyon.

The town plan was also lacking a clearly defined business district, resulting in commercial and residential buildings mixed together all over town. As development shifted, some areas became blighted because of less desirable uses. Some stores opened around the town square, however, and warehouses started to appear adjacent to the town's three major river landings, Upper Landing, above the modern Demopolis Yacht Basin and Marina; Webb's Landing at the western terminus of Washington Street; and Lower Landing to the west of Riverside Cemetery and the Whitfield Canal.

By the 1830s Demopolis had developed into a regional commercial river hub, attracting American and European-born craftsmen and merchants. Numerous plantation owners also established townhouses in the community or on its outskirts. But Demopolis was not dominated by a homogeneous elite planter class, as happened in other towns of the region. During these years and in the future, the river trade also brought numerous people with a desire for raucous entertainment. This created a profitable and brisk trade for those operating taverns and did much to earn early Demopolis a reputation for decadence.

During the 1840s many of the streets laid out by the town fathers had yet to be opened to traffic. The town council focused attention on clearing the intended streets and opening them to traffic, making other street improvements, and building wooden sidewalks along major thoroughfares to lift pedestrians above the mud. The council also approved measures to protect trees in the common areas and streets.

Several town ordinances were enacted in 1842 to restrain the enslaved African-American population. They were prohibited from selling or purchasing any article or commodity from or to a slave without written permission from their master or overseer. No slave was allowed to purchase alcohol without written consent; if any slave were convicted of assault upon "any white man, negro, or mulatto", the owner would be fined $50; any slave caught running "any horse, gelding, or mule" through town would be subject to fifteen lashes unless the owner paid a fine of $1; any slave caught driving any wagon or cart or driving a horse or mule on or across the sidewalks of the town would be subject to 10 lashes, unless the owner paid a fine of 50 cents.

The robust, frontier river town did not support the orderly organization of churches. A group of Methodist ministers who convened nearby in 1843 said that Demopolis was "wholly irreligious". Mainline Protestant churches were slow to take root; no churches were built in Demopolis until 1840. Prior to that time, various denominations met in a log assembly house on the town square. It was torn down in 1844. A Baptist group was established in the 1820s but disbanded due to a lack of support. The Episcopalians established a congregation in 1834, but did not build Trinity Episcopal Church until 1850. A Presbyterian congregation was established in 1839 and completed its first church in 1843, a brick structure on the town square. The Methodist congregation was established in 1840 and completed its first building in 1843.

Present in Demopolis from the beginning, with the French Catholic immigrants, the Catholic congregation in town was listed in 1851 as a mission of Saint John the Baptist in Tuscaloosa. It was switched to being supported by a church in Selma in 1880. They met in a small frame church and private homes until 1905, when the current Saint Leo the Great was built.

The Jewish congregation, B'nai Jeshurun, was established in 1858, although the community had been present since the 1840s. B'nai Jeshurun was the fourth Jewish congregation established in Alabama. They initially met in homes and businesses until eventually building a Moorish Revival-style temple in 1893.

By the 1850s several palatial steamboats were visiting the town as a regular stop on the Mobile to Columbus, Mississippi, route along the Tombigbee. These included the Forest Monarch, Alice Vivian, and the ill-fated Eliza Battle. Several others were dedicated almost exclusively to Demopolis and the cotton trade, including the Allen Glover, Canebrake, Cherokee, Demopolis, Frank Lyon, Marengo, and the Mollie Glover. Major hotels during this same period included the Planter's Hotel, later known as Madison House Hotel, and the River Hotel.

In 1853 a yellow fever epidemic struck the city. Some people were buried in an ill-defined two-acre cemetery to the north of town in the river bend. The Jewish Cemetery was established in 1878 to the east of town on Jefferson Street. The Glover Mausoleum had been completed on the banks of the Tombigbee in 1845, with the burial of many family members in and around it. Finally the city established its main burial ground, Riverside Cemetery, selling plots to the public in 1882.

A circular Gothic Revival-style amphitheater, complete with a crenelated roof-line, was completed in 1859 north of town in Webb's Bend at the fairgrounds. The fairgrounds and its buildings covered approximately 20 acres (8.1 ha) and hosted a variety of events until the outbreak of the Civil War.

By 1860, the population within the town limits had grown to approximately 1,200 people. The town began to attract new entertainments, such as musical and dramatic performances, concert artists, lecturers, circuses, and carnivals.

=== Civil War and aftermath ===
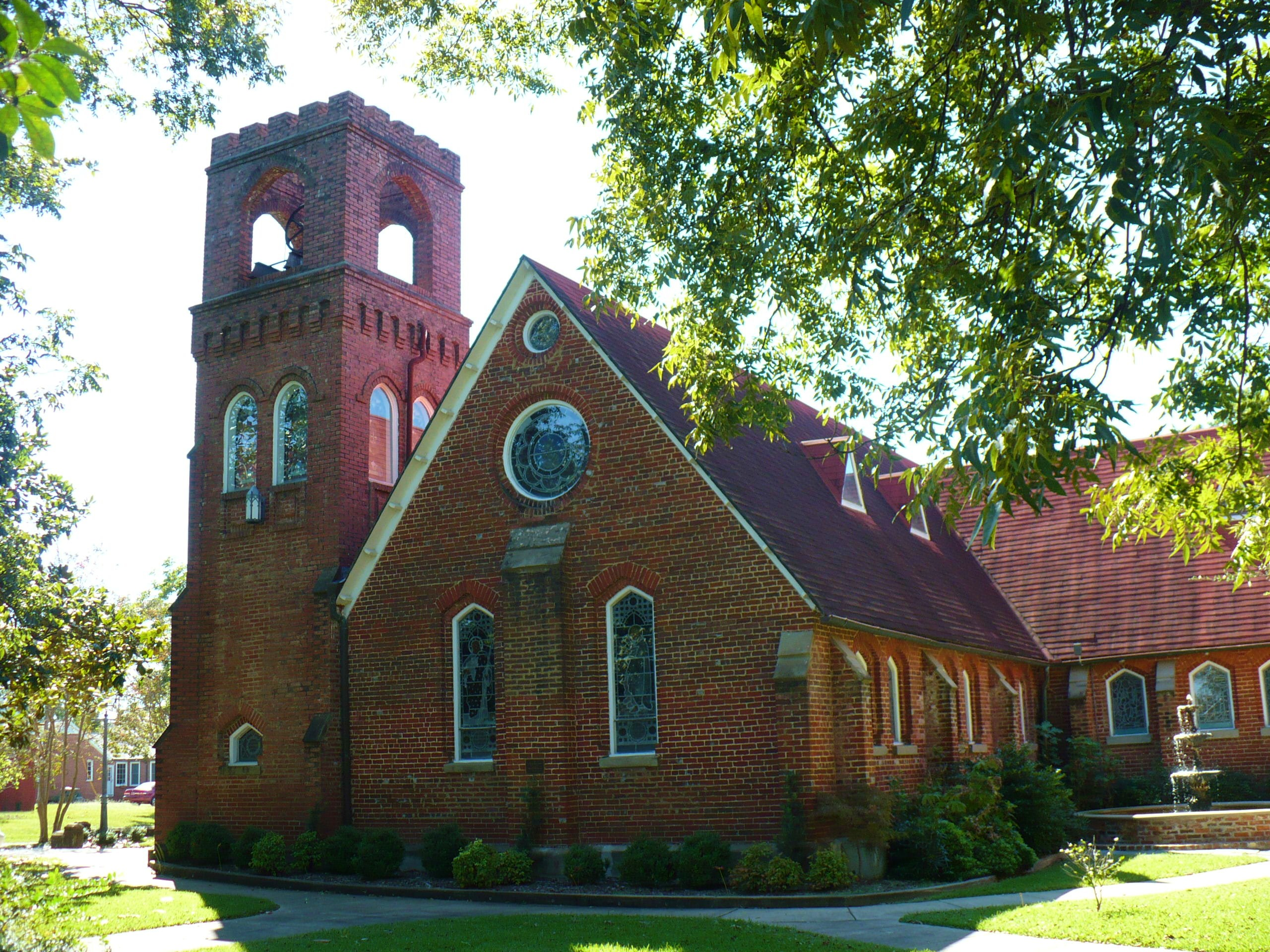
Trinity Episcopal Church was built in 1870 after the previous building burned in 1865 during the occupation of the city by Federal troops.

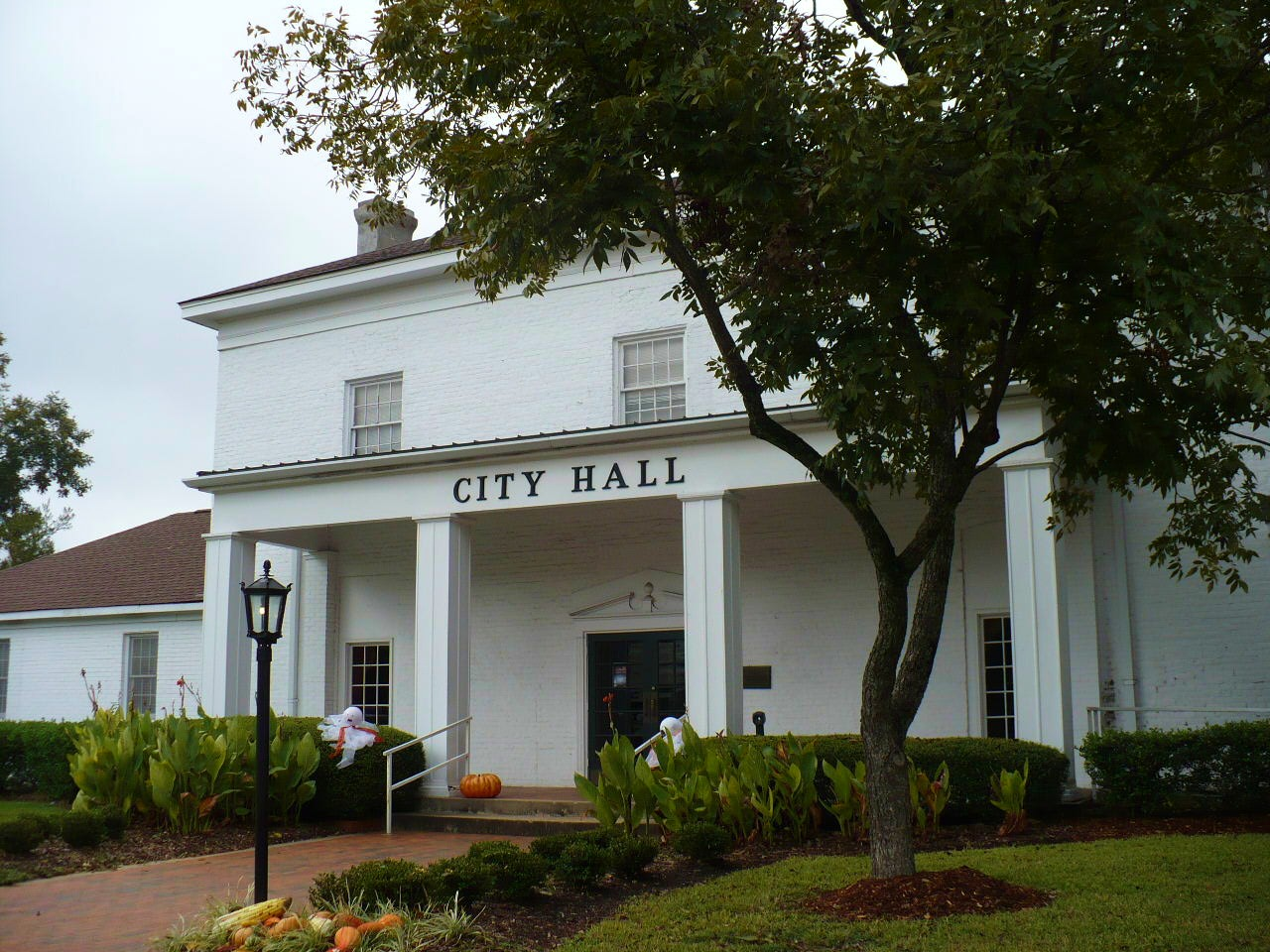
Demopolis City Hall in 2010. It was built as a courthouse annex in 1869–70.

Marengo County, with its large number of slaveholders, favored secession from the Union and the formation of the Confederate States of America. White residents of Demopolis shared these sentiments. Prominent secessionists included Nathan B. Whitfield, Francis S. Lyon, Goodman G. Griffin, Kimbrough C. DuBose, George B. Lyon, Dr. James D. Browder, and George E. Markham. But many other powerful men in town opposed secession, including Benjamin Glover Shields, William H. Lyon, Jr., William B. Jones, Pearson J. Glover, Gaius Whitfield, Alfred Hatch, Joel C. DuBose, Robert V. Montague, and Henry Augustine Tayloe. In the end, most men on both sides of the argument joined in the Confederate cause once secession was inevitable. It is not known whether the Jewish community supported or not the Union or opposed slavery.

With the start of the Civil War, several Confederate companies recruited from the population of Demopolis and Marengo County. The 4th, 11th, 21st, 23rd, and 43rd Alabama Infantry Regiments, in addition to the 8th Alabama Cavalry, Company E of the Jeff. Davis Legion, and Selden's Battery, were all established by local men. During the course of the war, more of these men would be lost to disease, exhaustion, and malnutrition than to battle casualties, as happened in both armies.

The city, based on two navigable rivers and a railroad, was used as the base for a number of Confederate installations and offices. These included commissary and quartermaster offices and warehouses, engineers' offices and workshops, a large ordnance depot, two large hospitals, and offices of the medical purveyor of the Department of Alabama, Mississippi, and East Louisiana. A huge military encampment was established at the fairgrounds in Webb's Bend. After the fall of Vicksburg and Port Hudson in July, 1863, several regiments of paroled Confederate troops were sent to a camp at Demopolis to await exchange. Thousands of soldiers entered the town at a time, which had only one thousand inhabitants prior to the war. Residents struggled to provide and secure sufficient food and accommodations.

Many hundreds of the soldiers who died in the hospitals during the war were buried in a Confederate cemetery on the south end of Webb's Bend. Today the site is underwater, following the damming of the river below Demopolis in the 20th century.

After the loss of its primary east–west railroad during the war, in 1862 the Confederate government completed the Alabama and Mississippi Rivers Railroad from Selma through Demopolis and to Meridian, Mississippi. The project had been in the works since the 1850s, but several miles between Demopolis and Uniontown had not been finished when war erupted. As the war raged in all directions around Demopolis in 1864, the city was subjected to a huge influx of war refugees. Nathan B. Whitfield noted in his journal that those from Mobile had taken every available vacant house, and others were crowded with local people, along with their descendants and relatives.

In March 1865 the people of Demopolis prepared to defend the town against Union threats, and fortified key positions. Three circular batteries, surrounded by earthworks, were constructed and other fortifications built across the southern reaches of town. With the impending fall of Selma in early April, during Wilson's Raid, all of the railroad's rolling stock was sent full of supplies westward through Demopolis and on to Meridian. A flotilla of eighteen Confederate gunboats and packet ships were relocated to the Tombigbee River at Demopolis around this same time. These included the CSS Nashville, CSS Morgan, CSS Baltic, the Southern Republic, Black Diamond, Admiral, Clipper, Farrand, Marengo and St. Nicholas.

With the surrender of the last of the Confederates, Demopolis found itself a much different city from what it had been prior to the war. At the end of May 1865, the townspeople learned that an occupying force of Federal soldiers, the 5th Minnesota Infantry, were en route to occupy the town. Once there, they occupied the former fairgrounds. Despite the usual unpleasantness associated with the occupation of many defeated Southern towns, two of the Minnesota commanders, Colonel William B. Gere and General Lucius Frederick Hubbard, apparently came to be well-liked by the townspeople. Despite some bright spots in relations, the Episcopal Church in the South was slow to give up on the notion of the Confederacy, resulting in the military governor of Alabama closing all Episcopal churches in the state, effective on September 20, 1865. Trinity Episcopal Church in Demopolis was put under Federal guard, and during this time the church mysteriously burned down. Blame was placed on the soldiers for intentionally burning it, but this has never been borne out by the facts. Aside from all of this, the more pressing matter was the devastated economy of the community and surrounding countryside, a problem that would continue through the Reconstruction era.

During Reconstruction, the new authorities in charge of the government decided to move the county seat of Marengo from its central location in Linden to Demopolis by an act approved on December 4, 1868. The county appointed Richard Jones Jr., Lewis B. McCarty, and Dr. Bryan W. Whitfield to build or buy a new courthouse in Demopolis. They negotiated the purchase of the Presbyterian church on the town square, now known as Rooster Hall, for the sum of $3,000. It was conveyed to the county on April 8, 1869. The county built a fireproof brick building next door to the former church in 1869–70 to house the probate and circuit clerk offices. This building serves as Demopolis City Hall today. The move of the county seat was highly controversial, and the Alabama Legislature set April 18, 1870, as the date for a county-wide referendum to decide if Dayton, Demopolis, or Linden would become the county seat. Due to the closeness of the vote and voting irregularities, a run-off between Linden and Demopolis was set for May 14, 1870. Irregularities appeared again and votes from Dayton, mostly in favor of Linden, were rejected by the board of supervisors. Linden continued an attempt to persuade the state legislature to move the county seat back to their town, with success in February 1871. The former courthouse buildings reverted from county ownership to Demopolis and remain city property today.

=== 20th century ===
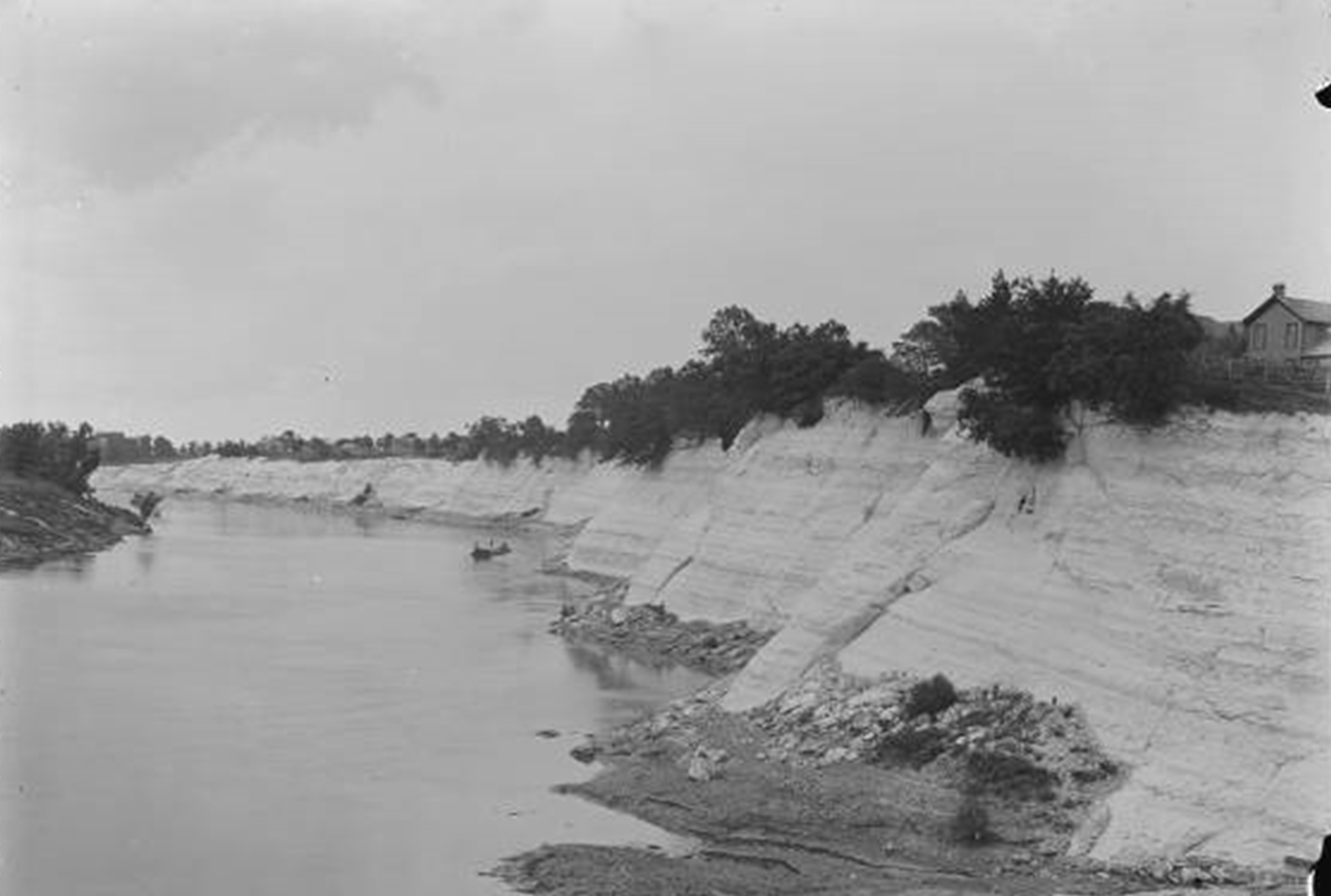
White Bluff at Demopolis in 1903

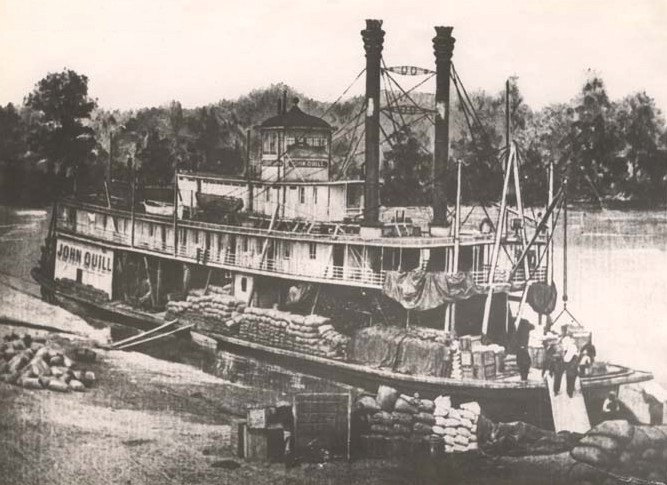
The John Quill at Webb's Landing in Demopolis in 1912

The struggle to rebuild the economy of Demopolis and the surrounding region continued into the 20th century. The growing, trading, and milling of cotton continued to be a major basis of the economy up until the World War I-era. The boll weevil infestations of the 1920s and the Great Depression of the 1930s finally ended the one-crop farming system.

Demopolis had electric lights, water works and a sewerage system, chert-covered streets, paved sidewalks, and a fire department by the second decade of the 20th century. It was increasingly serving as a major banking and retail hub in the region during this time. Major financial institutions included the Commercial National Bank, City Bank and Trust Company, and Robertson Banking Company. One of the first large department stores of note in the area, Mayer Brothers, built its three-story brick building across from the public square in 1897 and operated for most of the 20th century. That building is now utilized by Robertson Banking Company. The Rosenbush Furniture Company was established in 1895 and operated until 2002. The J. H. Spight Grocery was established in 1901 as one of the earliest and most successful grocery stores for more than 50 years, prior to the era of corporate chain stores. Although the community had many newspapers throughout its first 100 years, the only one to survive into the 21st century, The Demopolis Times, was established in 1904.

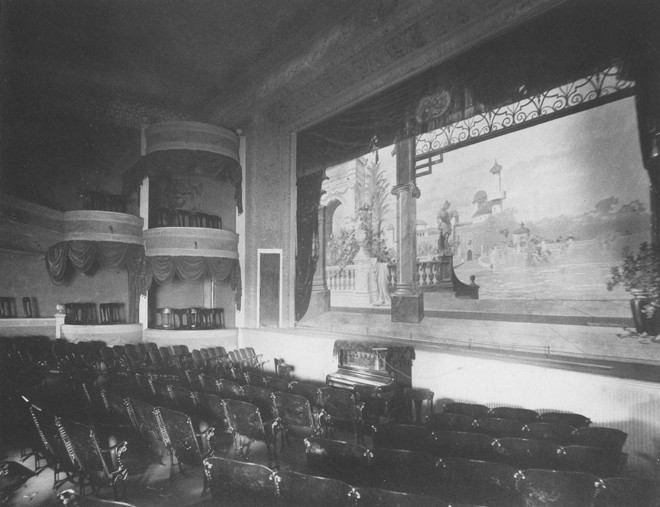
Interior of the Braswell Opera House in 1907

Theaters sprang up in the city, beginning in the late 19th century. Rooster Hall, following its incarnations as a church, courthouse, and then a city property, was leased for use as the Demopolis Opera House from 1876 to 1902. It hosted live dramatic performances, civic lectures, and minstrel shows. The Braswell Opera House, with its ornate interior and private box galleries, opened on October 23, 1902, with a performance of Louisiana playwright Epsy William's Unorna, from Francis Marion Crawford's The Witch of Prague. It continued as an entertainment venue into the 1920s and was eventually demolished in 1972–73. The first theater built for the presentation of motion pictures, the Elks Theater, opened on October 1, 1915. It was renamed the Si-Non in 1916. The building was restored during the 1990s.

Following the demise of cotton production, beef cattle farming and, more recently, catfish aquaculture became new major agricultural pursuits. Industrial activities became the major sources of employment by mid-century, with the cement, lumber, and paper industries playing a prominent role in the city's economy into the 21st century.

== Geography ==
According to the United States Census Bureau, the city has a total area of 18.066 square miles (46.79 km^{2}), of which 17.744 square miles (45.96 km^{2}) is land and 0.322 square miles (0.83 km^{2}), is water.

Demopolis is on the northern edge of Marengo County, bordered to the north, across the Black Warrior River, by Greene County and to the northwest, across the Tombigbee River, by Sumter County.

U.S. Route 43 passes through the city center as North Walnut Avenue, East Capitol Street, and South Cedar Avenue, while U.S. Route 80 runs along the southern edge of the downtown. US 43 leads north 24 miles (39 km) to Eutaw and south 17 miles (27 km) to Linden, while US 80 leads east 20 miles (32 km) to Uniontown and west 34 miles (55 km) to Cuba.

=== Climate ===
The climate in this area is characterized by hot, humid summers and generally mild to cool winters. According to the Köppen Climate Classification system, Demopolis has a humid subtropical climate, abbreviated "Cfa" on climate maps.

Climate data for Demopolis, Alabama, 1991–2020 normals, extremes 1951–present
Month	Jan	Feb	Mar	Apr	May	Jun	Jul	Aug	Sep	Oct	Nov	Dec	Year
Record high °F (°C)	81 (27)	85 (29)	89 (32)	96 (36)	99 (37)	104 (40)	105 (41)	105 (41)	103 (39)	100 (38)	88 (31)	82 (28)	105 (41)
Mean maximum °F (°C)	74.2 (23.4)	77.2 (25.1)	83.1 (28.4)	87.1 (30.6)	92.4 (33.6)	95.3 (35.2)	97.2 (36.2)	97.3 (36.3)	94.3 (34.6)	88.3 (31.3)	80.7 (27.1)	75.0 (23.9)	98.5 (36.9)
Mean daily maximum °F (°C)	56.7 (13.7)	61.0 (16.1)	69.2 (20.7)	76.6 (24.8)	84.3 (29.1)	89.5 (31.9)	92.0 (33.3)	91.4 (33.0)	87.0 (30.6)	77.5 (25.3)	66.7 (19.3)	58.9 (14.9)	75.9 (24.4)
Daily mean °F (°C)	45.3 (7.4)	48.9 (9.4)	56.4 (13.6)	63.7 (17.6)	72.1 (22.3)	78.6 (25.9)	81.4 (27.4)	80.9 (27.2)	76.1 (24.5)	65.2 (18.4)	54.2 (12.3)	47.6 (8.7)	64.2 (17.9)
Mean daily minimum °F (°C)	33.9 (1.1)	36.8 (2.7)	43.7 (6.5)	50.8 (10.4)	60.0 (15.6)	67.6 (19.8)	70.8 (21.6)	70.4 (21.3)	65.2 (18.4)	53.0 (11.7)	41.6 (5.3)	36.2 (2.3)	52.5 (11.4)
Mean minimum °F (°C)	18.6 (−7.4)	22.5 (−5.3)	27.0 (−2.8)	36.8 (2.7)	45.9 (7.7)	58.2 (14.6)	64.7 (18.2)	62.0 (16.7)	53.1 (11.7)	38.4 (3.6)	27.2 (−2.7)	21.8 (−5.7)	16.1 (−8.8)
Record low °F (°C)	−2 (−19)	6 (−14)	15 (−9)	25 (−4)	40 (4)	42 (6)	54 (12)	50 (10)	36 (2)	16 (−9)	14 (−10)	4 (−16)	−2 (−19)
Average precipitation inches (mm)	5.66 (144)	5.45 (138)	5.75 (146)	4.85 (123)	3.65 (93)	4.65 (118)	5.03 (128)	4.85 (123)	3.38 (86)	3.25 (83)	4.30 (109)	5.39 (137)	56.21 (1,428)
Average snowfall inches (cm)	0.0 (0.0)	0.0 (0.0)	0.2 (0.51)	0.0 (0.0)	0.0 (0.0)	0.0 (0.0)	0.0 (0.0)	0.0 (0.0)	0.0 (0.0)	0.0 (0.0)	0.0 (0.0)	0.0 (0.0)	0.2 (0.51)
Average precipitation days (≥ 0.01 in)	9.4	8.6	8.6	7.5	7.5	8.9	9.5	8.2	6.3	5.4	7.0	9.2	96.1
Average snowy days (≥ 0.1 in)	0.0	0.0	0.0	0.0	0.0	0.0	0.0	0.0	0.0	0.0	0.0	0.0	0.0
Source 1: NOAA
Source 2: National Weather Service

== Demographics ==
Historical population
Census	Pop.	Note	%±
1850	812		—
1860	473		−41.7%
1870	1,539		225.4%
1880	1,389		−9.7%
1890	1,398		0.6%
1900	2,606		86.4%
1910	2,417		−7.3%
1920	2,779		15.0%
1930	4,037		45.3%
1940	4,137		2.5%
1950	5,004		21.0%
1960	7,377		47.4%
1970	7,651		3.7%
1980	7,678		0.4%
1990	7,512		−2.2%
2000	7,540		0.4%
2010	7,483		−0.8%
2020	7,162		−4.3%
2022 (est.)	6,882	▼	−3.9%
U.S. Decennial Census; 2020 Census

=== Racial and ethnic composition ===
Demopolis city, Alabama – Racial and ethnic composition Note: the US Census treats Hispanic/Latino as an ethnic category. This table excludes Latinos from the racial categories and assigns them to a separate category. Hispanics/Latinos may be of any race.
Race / Ethnicity (NH = Non-Hispanic)	Pop 1980	Pop 1990	Pop 2000	Pop 2010	Pop 2020	% 1980	% 1990	% 2000	% 2010	% 2020
White alone (NH)	3,925	3,863	3,585	3,477	2,900	51.12%	51.42%	47.55%	46.47%	40.49%
Black or African American alone (NH)	3,482	3,601	3,814	3,732	3,869	45.35%	47.94%	50.58%	49.87%	54.02%
Native American or Alaska Native alone (NH)	0	5	7	6	1	0.00%	0.07%	0.09%	0.08%	0.01%
Asian alone (NH)	7	5	15	40	46	0.09%	0.07%	0.20%	0.53%	0.64%
Native Hawaiian or Pacific Islander alone (NH)	x	x	0	1	1	x	x	0.00%	0.01%	0.01%
Other race alone (NH)	0	2	6	1	11	0.00%	0.03%	0.08%	0.01%	0.15%
Mixed race or Multiracial (NH)	x	x	39	45	129	x	x	0.52%	0.60%	1.80%
Hispanic or Latino (any race)	264	36	74	181	205	3.44%	0.48%	0.98%	2.42%	2.86%
Total	7,678	7,512	7,540	7,483	7,162	100.00%	100.00%	100.00%	100.00%	100.00%

=== 2020 census ===
As of the 2020 census, there were 7,162 people, 2,973 households, and 1,883 families residing in the city. The population density was 403.6 inhabitants per square mile (155.8/km^{2}).

The median age was 38.7 years; 25.3% of residents were under the age of 18 and 18.3% were 65 years of age or older. For every 100 females there were 80.0 males, and for every 100 females age 18 and over there were 75.9 males.

Of the 2,973 households, 33.3% had children under the age of 18 living in them. Married-couple households accounted for 33.9%, 18.4% were households with a male householder and no spouse or partner present, and 42.7% were households with a female householder and no spouse or partner present. About 33.0% of all households were made up of individuals, and 13.7% had someone living alone who was 65 years of age or older.

There were 3,400 housing units, of which 12.6% were vacant. The homeowner vacancy rate was 1.8% and the rental vacancy rate was 6.5%.

86.9% of residents lived in urban areas, while 13.1% lived in rural areas.

=== 2010 census ===
As of the 2010 census, there were 7,483 people, 3,049 households, and 1,998 families residing in the city. The population density was 613.4 inhabitants per square mile (236.8/km^{2}). There were 3,417 housing units at an average density of 280.1 per square mile (108.1/km^{2}). The racial makeup of the city was 50.1% Black or African American, 47.3% White, 0.1% Native American, 0.5% Asian, none Pacific Islander, 1.1% from other races, and 0.8% from two or more races. 2.4% of the population were Hispanic or Latino of any race.

There were 3,049 households, out of which 31.2% had children under the age of 18 living with them, 38.6% were married couples living together, 23.3% had a female householder with no husband present, and 34.5% were non-families. 31.2% of all households were made up of individuals, and 12.0% had someone living alone who was 65 years of age or older. The average household size was 2.42 and the average family size was 3.04.

In the city, the population was spread out, with 27.0% under the age of 18, 8.8% from 18 to 24, 24.1% from 25 to 44, 25.3% from 45 to 64, and 14.8% who were 65 years of age or older. The median age was 37.1 years. For every 100 females, there were 80.7 males. For every 100 females age 18 and over, there were 78.2 males.

The median income for a household in the city was $35,583, and the median income for a family was $49,973. Males had a median income of $50,734 versus $31,520 for females. The per capita income for the city was $21,116. About 19.1% of families and 26.8% of the population were below the poverty line, including 25.4% of those under age 18 and 27.5% of those age 65 or over.

=== 2000 census ===
As of the 2000 census, there were 7,540 people, 3,014 households, and 2,070 families residing in the city. The population density was 616.4 inhabitants per square mile (238.0/km^{2}). There were 3,311 housing units at an average density of 270.7 per square mile (104.5/km^{2}). The racial makeup of the city was 50.90% Black or African American, 47.75% White, 0.09% Native American, 0.20% Asian, none Pacific Islander, 0.48% from other races, and 0.58% from two or more races. 0.98% of the population were Hispanic or Latino of any race.

There were 3,014 households, out of which 34.9% had children under the age of 18 living with them, 43.1% were married couples living together, 22.5% had a female householder with no husband present, and 31.3% were non-families. 28.9% of all households were made up of individuals, and 12.3% had someone living alone who was 65 years of age or older. The average household size was 2.48 and the average family size was 3.05.

In the city, the population was spread out, with 29.1% under the age of 18, 8.4% from 18 to 24, 26.6% from 25 to 44, 21.6% from 45 to 64, and 14.3% who were 65 years of age or older. The median age was 36 years. For every 100 females, there were 81.5 males. For every 100 females age 18 and over, there were 75.0 males.

The median income for a household in the city was $26,481, and the median income for a family was $35,752. Males had a median income of $37,206 versus $20,265 for females. The per capita income for the city was $16,687. About 26.0% of families and 30.6% of the population were below the poverty line, including 38.3% of those under age 18 and 21.1% of those age 65 or over.

== Arts and culture ==
=== Historic sites ===
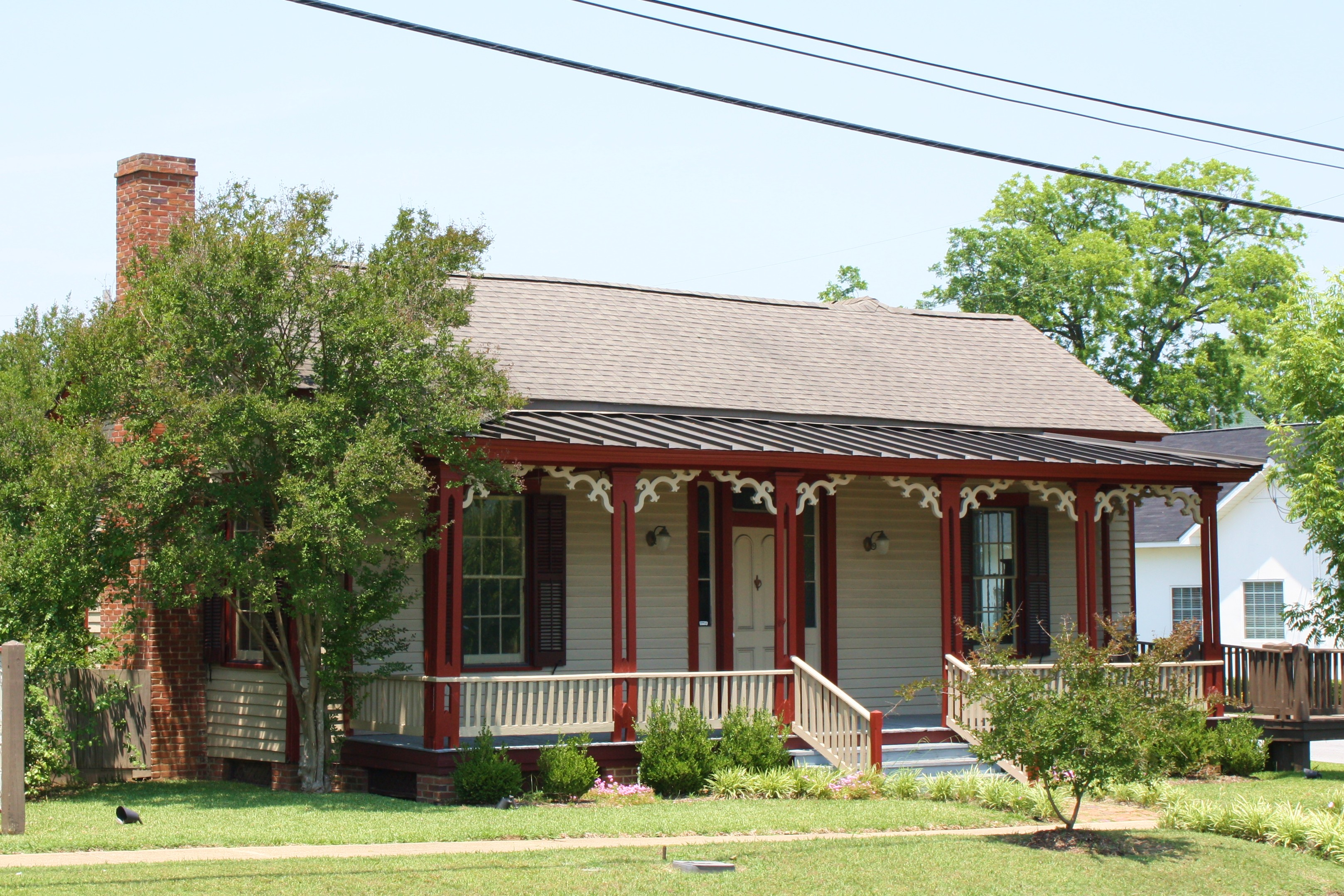
Laird Cottage in 2011, built in 1870.

Gaineswood is an antebellum historic house museum on the National Register of Historic Places and is a listed National Historic Landmark. It was built between 1843 and 1861 in an asymmetrical Greek Revival style. It features domed ceilings, ornate plasterwork, columned rooms, and most of its original furnishings. Gaineswood is owned and operated by the Alabama Historical Commission.

Bluff Hall is an antebellum historic house museum on the National Register of Historic Places. It was built in 1832 in the Federal style and modified in the 1840s to reflect the Greek Revival style. It is owned and operated by the Marengo County Historical Society.

Laird Cottage is a restored 1870 residence with a mix of the Greek Revival and Italianate styles. It currently serves as the headquarters of the Marengo County Historical Society and also houses history exhibits and the works of Geneva Mercer, a Marengo County native who gained fame as an artist and sculptor. She served as an intern to Giuseppe Moretti, the sculptor who created Birmingham's monumental Vulcan. Following her internship, she lived and worked with Moretti and his wife until his death.

Other historic sites in Demopolis include White Bluff, the Demopolis Historic Business District, Demopolis Town Square, Lyon Hall, Ashe Cottage, the Curtis House, the Glover Mausoleum, and the Foscue-Whitfield House.

== Government ==
Current City Council Membership
District	Representative	Position
1	Charles Jones, Jr	Councilman
2	Nathan Hardy	Councilman
3	David McCants	Councilman
4	Bill Meador	Councilman
5	Jim Stanford	Councilman
All	Woody Collins	Mayor

Demopolis is governed by a mayor–council system. The mayor is elected at large to a four-year term and functions as the executive officer, appointing department heads and advisory board members and signing off on all motions, resolutions and ordinances passed by the council.

The city council consists of five members who are elected from single member districts. The council controls all legislative and policy-making for the city through the use of ordinance, resolution or motion. The council also adopts the annual budget and confirms appointments made by the mayor.

== Education ==
The city runs its own citywide public school system, the Demopolis City School District. Private schools in the city included one integrated Christian school, West Alabama Christian School, which closed in 2018. The city is also home to the Demopolis Higher Education Center. The facility, which opened in 2004, is a 15,000 square foot structure, including a library and open area student atrium, a science lab, conference room, six multimedia classrooms, and two computer labs; Community Rooms provide one of the largest and most modern meeting spaces in Marengo County.

== Infrastructure ==
=== Transportation ===
- U.S. Highway 80
- U.S. Highway 43
- State Route 28
- State Route 69

Major roads include two U.S. Highways: U.S. Route 80 (US 80) runs east–west through the city and US 43 runs north–south. Alabama state highways include State Route 8 (SR 8), SR 13, and nearby SR 69 and SR 28. A proposed Interstate 85 (I-85) extension from I-59/I-20 near the Mississippi state line to I-65 near Montgomery is planned to pass near the city. A bus system is operated by West Alabama Transportation.

Demopolis is served by several railway companies, including Norfolk Southern Railway, BNSF Railway, and the Alabama and Gulf Coast Railway.

The Alabama State Port Authority has inland docks at the Port of Demopolis with direct access to inland and Intracoastal waterways serving the Great Lakes, the Ohio and Tennessee rivers and the Gulf of Mexico via the Tennessee-Tombigbee Waterway.

The Demopolis Municipal Airport is located northwest of the city, adjacent to Airport Industrial Park and the Tennessee-Tombigbee Waterway. It has a 5,000-foot runway and a ten-unit hangar.

Intercity bus service was provided by Greyhound Lines, but the service has since been discontinued.

== Notable people ==
- Richard H. Clarke, former U.S. Representative for the 1st District of Alabama
- A. G. Gaston, business man and supporter of civil rights
- James T. Jones, former U.S. Representative for Alabama
- Francis S. Lyon, former U.S. Congressman for the 5th District of Alabama
- Charles Wilson Pierce, former U.S. Congressman for the 4th District of Alabama and State Senator in Nebraska
- Theo Ratliff, professional basketball player
- Jim Rogers, American investor and financial commentator
- George W. Taylor, former U.S. Representative for the 1st District of Alabama
- Spencer Turnbull, professional baseball pitcher
- Duck Williams, professional basketball player

== In popular culture ==
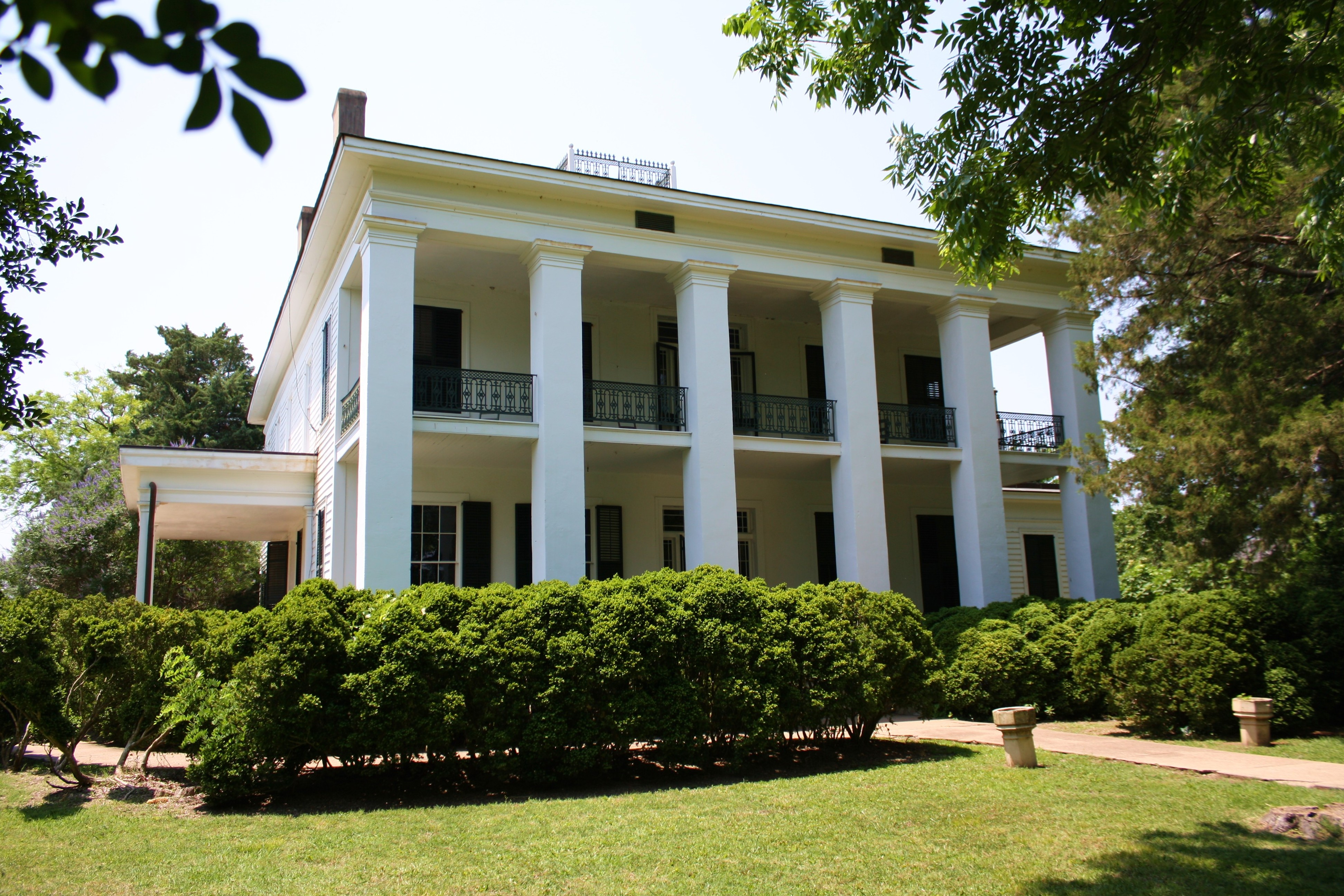
Lyon Hall in 2011. It was built in 1853. It, along with Bluff Hall, served as inspiration for "Lionnet" in The Little Foxes.

The Marx and Newhouse families of Demopolis were reputedly the inspiration for The Little Foxes, a Broadway play. The melodrama was written by Lillian Hellman, whose maternal ancestors were all natives of Demopolis. It was first performed in 1939, with Alabama-born actress Tallulah Bankhead in the lead role of Regina. This production ran a year on Broadway. The 1941 film version was directed by William Wyler and starred Bette Davis, Herbert Marshall and Teresa Wright. It was nominated for an Academy Award for Best Picture in 1941. In 1949 the play was adapted into an opera by Marc Blitzstein, under the title Regina.

Lillian Hellman's 1946 play, Another Part of the Forest, was also loosely based on her Demopolis ancestors.

The 1949 film The Fighting Kentuckian is set in Demopolis and tells a story about an interaction with the original French settlers. The basic plot features two Kentuckians returning from service with Andrew Jackson's forces in the War of 1812. Their unit passes through the port of Mobile, Alabama, where John Breen, played by John Wayne, meets the pretty Fleurette De Marchand, played by Vera Ralston, from Demopolis. He makes sure the unit passes through Demopolis on its way back home and he stays there as the unit leaves. He discovers that De Marchand is about to marry a wealthy riverman and a love triangle ensues, with Breen eventually winning out.

== See also ==
- Christmas on the River
- List of people from Demopolis, Alabama
- National Register of Historic Places listings in Marengo County, Alabama

== Bibliography ==
- Demopolis Chamber of Commerce (1965). The Story of Demopolis a condensed history of the founding and development of Demopolis, Alabama. Demopolis, Alabama: Demopolis Chamber of Commerce.
- Martin, Thomas (1937). French Military Adventurers in Alabama, 1818–1828. Princeton University Press.
- Whitfield, Gaius (1904). The French Grant in Alabama: A History of the Founding of Demopolis. Historical Papers, 1st-2d Ser.
