= Battle of Fort Brooke =

Battle of the American Civil War

Coordinates: 28.00062°N 82.47368°W

- Part of the American Civil War
Date	October 16, 1863 – October 18, 1863
Location	Tampa, Florida
Result	Union victory

Belligerents
United States (Union)	(Confederate States of America) CSA (Confederacy)

Commanders and leaders
(United States Navy) A.A. Semmes	(Confederate States of America) John S. Westcott

Units involved
USS Tahoma; USS Adela	2nd Florida Infantry, Company A

Casualties and losses
16	Unknown

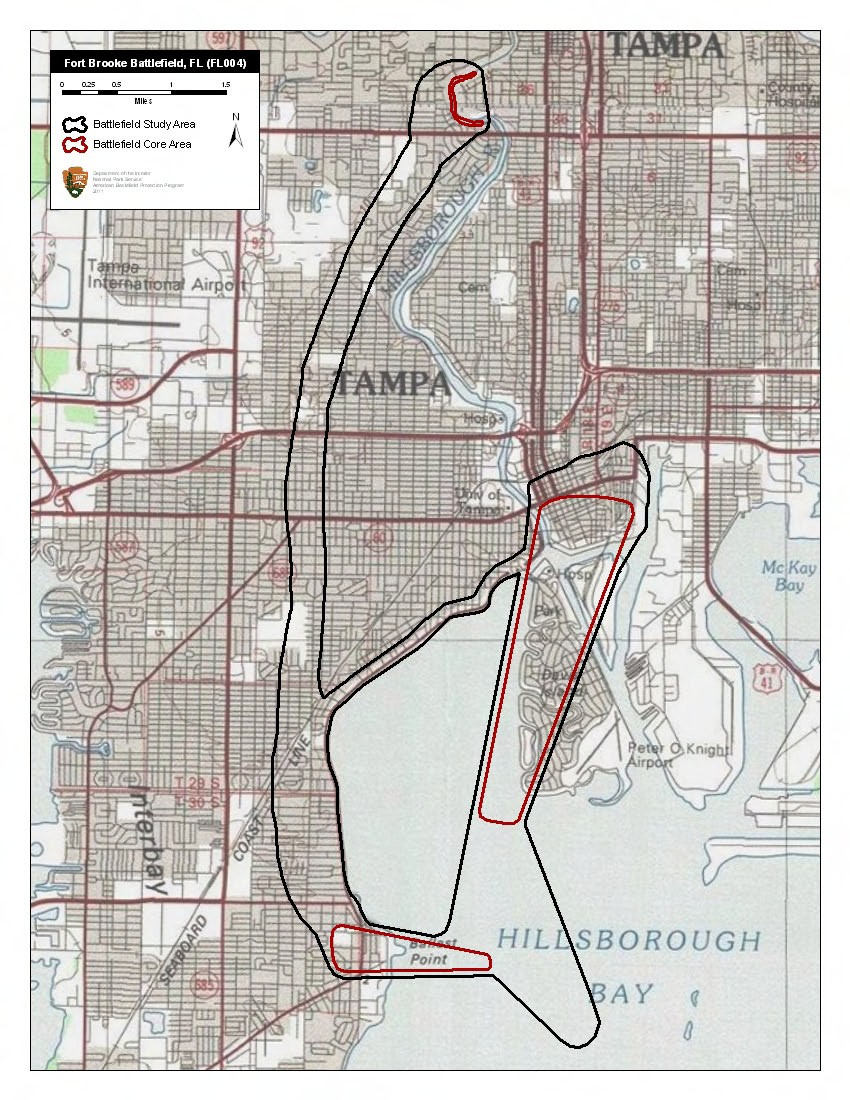
Map of Fort Brooke Battlefield core and study areas by the American Battlefield Protection Program.

The Battle of Fort Brooke was a minor engagement fought October 16–18, 1863 in and around Tampa, Florida during the American Civil War. The most important outcome of the action was the destruction of two Confederate blockade runners which had been hidden upstream on the Hillsborough River.

== Background ==
An important facet of the Union's long-term strategy during the American Civil War was the Anaconda Plan, which established a blockade along much of the coast of the Confederate States. Though only a small town at the time, Tampa had been an important port for exporting cattle and crops from ranches and farms in the interior of central Florida before the war. By 1862, most local shipping had been stymied by Union Navy ships patrolling near the mouth of Tampa Bay. However, several fast blockade runners based in Tampa had consistently slipped out to deliver cattle and cotton to Spanish Cuba in exchange for needed goods and gold.

The Battle of Tampa took place in June 1862, after the Union gunboat USS Sagamore steamed into Tampa Bay and demanded the surrender of the small Confederate garrison at Fort Brooke. When the demand was rebuffed, the gunboat fired several volleys at the town, which were answered with return fire from the fort. Neither side suffered damage or casualties, and the Sagamore returned to its station blockading the mouth of Tampa Bay after about 24 hours. While the brief exchange had no effect on the fort, the town, or the blockade runners based there, it did have the effect of allowing Union forces to determine the maximum range of the Confederate artillery in the area.

== Battle ==
In the autumn of 1862, Captain A.A. Semmes, the commander of Union naval forces off Florida's west coast, decided to mount an operation to end the blockade running that had continued from Tampa. Two Union gunships, USS Tahoma and USS Adela, sailed into Tampa Bay on October 16, 1863, and began a slow bombardment of Fort Brooke while staying just out of the range of the fort's batteries. Two days later on October 18, a Union raiding party under Acting Master T.R. Harris secretly disembarked at Ballast Point, landing near the current intersection of Bayshore Boulevard and Gandy Boulevard. While the Union gunships continued a diversionary bombardment of the fort, about 100 Union troops marched 14 miles (23 km) north through a heavily wooded area that was later developed into the neighborhoods of Palma Ceia, West Tampa, and Seminole Heights. Their target was the Jean Street Shipyard on the Hillsborough River near today's Sligh Avenue, and upon reaching their destination, they quickly seized and burned several ships moored at the dock including two notorious blockade runners, the steamship Scottish Chief and the sloop Kate Dale.

The ships and the shipyard were owned by the once and future mayor of Tampa, James McKay. Escaping capture by the attackers along with some crew members, McKay sped to the town and warned the Confederate forces at Fort Brooke about the raiding party and the fate of his ships. The 2nd Florida Infantry Battalion along with the Oklawaha Rangers cavalry unit and a few citizens of the town quickly gave chase and caught up with the Union detachment near their landing point on Tampa Bay. A short but sharp engagement known as the Battle of Ballast Point ensued as Union troops attempted to board their dinghies near today's Ballast Point Park and return to the waiting ships in the bay. With the support of covering fire from Tahoma and Adelia directed at Confederate forces on shore, the raiding party reached the ships having suffered 16 casualties. Union forces sailed out of Tampa Bay soon thereafter.

== Aftermath ==
The blockade running steamer Scottish Chief was heavily damaged but remained afloat after it burned. It was towed back downriver to near today's Blake High School, stripped of usable materials, and destroyed. The steamer A.B. Noyes, which had also been damaged in the raid, was similarly broken down to preclude her capture. The Kate Dale sank near its mooring and remains at the bottom of the Hillsborough River near the current location of ZooTampa.

The raid met its objectives. Shipping out of Tampa came to a virtual halt for the duration of the war, damaging the Confederate war effort and crippling the local economy. When Union forces again landed in May 1864, Fort Brooke was no longer garrisoned and the town had been virtually abandoned. Remaining cannon and supplies at the fort were destroyed, and after a short occupation, Union troops left the area.
