= John S. Westcott =

American surveyor (1807–1888)

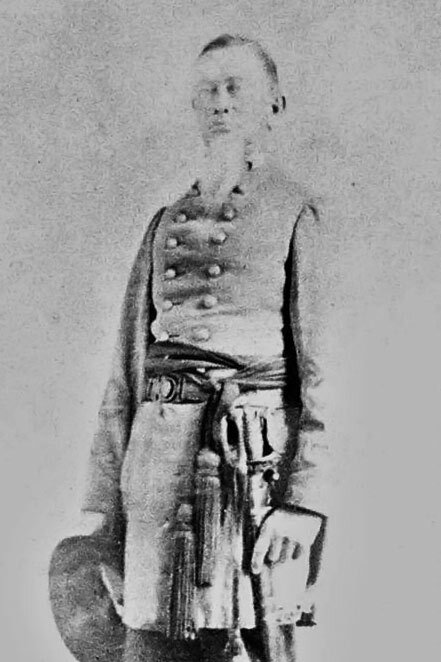
- Westcott c. 1861–1865

Surveyor General of Florida
- In office 1853–1858
- Appointed by: Millard Fillmore
- Preceded by: Benjamin A. Putnam
- Succeeded by: Francis L. Dancy

Member of the Florida House of Representatives
- In office 1879
- Constituency: St. Johns County
- In office 1846
- Constituency: Madison County

Personal details
- Born: June 16, 1807 Bridgeton, New Jersey, U.S.
- Died: December 31, 1888 (aged 81) St. Augustine, Florida, U.S.
- Party: Democratic (until c. 1850, after c. 1860); Whig (c. 1850s); Know Nothing (c. 1856); Independent Democrat (1858–c. 1860)
- Relations: Westcott family
- Education: United States Military Academy (attended)

Military service
- Allegiance: United States; Confederate States
- Branch/service: United States Volunteers; Confederate States Army
- Years of service: 1840–1842 (USA); 1862–1865 (CSA)
- Rank: Surgeon (USA); Major (CSA)
- Unit: Florida Mounted Volunteers; 2nd Florida Infantry Battalion; 10th Florida Infantry
- Battles/wars: Second Seminole War; American Civil War; Battle of Fort Brooke; Battle of Cold Harbor; Siege of Petersburg; Battle of Appomattox Court House (surrendered)

John S. Westcott (June 16, 1807 – December 31, 1888) was an American surveyor, medical doctor, politician, and Confederate States Army officer. He played key roles in the early development of Florida, and served as the surveyor general of Florida from 1853 until 1858. During the American Civil War, Westcott commanded Confederate forces at the Battle of Fort Brooke in 1863.

Westcott was born into a political family in New Jersey. After briefly attending West Point, he studied medicine in Philadelphia. In the late 1830s, he moved to Florida and joined the U.S. Volunteers as a surgeon during the Second Seminole War. Westcott was a major early figure in the development of Florida's education system. He founded the St. Johns Seminary of Learning – then one of Florida's top educational institutions – and pushed for "a system of free public education" as a member of the Florida House of Representatives in 1846.

Appointed surveyor general of Florida in 1853, Westcott advocated for the non-violent removal of the Seminole, and he and his deputies meticulously mapped the swamps of South Florida. During the American Civil War, Westcott was commissioned as an officer in the Confederate army, first as a captain in the 2nd Florida Infantry Battalion and later as a major in the 10th Florida Infantry Regiment. In his later life, Westcott was a central figure in the development of Florida's infrastructure as the founding president of the Florida Coast Line Canal and Transportation Company, which would dredge an inland waterway along the entire length of Florida's east coast.

== Early life and education ==
John S. Westcott was born on June 16, 1807, in Bridgeton, New Jersey. His father James Westcott Sr. was a local politician who would later become the secretary of state of New Jersey. Westcott's admission to the United States Military Academy was sponsored by Senator Samuel L. Southard, one of his father's associates. He joined the corps of cadets on July 1, 1823, but struggled at the academy, and resigned his commission on November 15, 1823. Westcott would go on to study medicine in Philadelphia.

== Early military and political career ==
=== Second Seminole War and early political career ===
Westcott disappears from the historical record until 1838 or 1839, when he arrived in the Florida Territory, where his older brother James Westcott was a local politician. The territory was at that time involved in the Second Seminole War, resulting in a high demand for doctors on its frontier. Westcott enlisted with the Florida Mounted Volunteers on April 20, 1840, serving as an assistant surgeon in the 1st Regiment under Colonel William Bailey. He was quickly promoted to the rank of surgeon, and served until the end of the war.

Settling in Madison County, Florida, Westcott was well-respected for his conduct during the war and became a prominent member of local society. He co-founded the St. Johns Seminary of Learning, which became one of Florida's top educational institutions. Westcott also helped found Madison County's masonic lodge, and was the local doctor and postmaster. In 1846, Westcott was a member of the first legislative session of the Florida House of Representatives. A member of the Democratic Party, he was a major figure in the early development of the state's educational system as chairman of the Committee on Schools and Colleges. In this role, he pushed for "a system of free public education". Westcott left the legislature at the end of his term.

=== Surveying career ===
In 1847, Florida's surveyor general Robert Butler granted Westcott a commission as a deputy surveyor with the United States General Land Office. Westcott distinguished himself in this role, and was noted for his meticulous work. His first assignment was to map the headwaters of the Little Withlacoochee River in the Green Swamp. Westcott surveyed some of the most inhospitable portions of the swamp; though these areas were unsuitable for human development, the Seminole were known for using such locations as refuges, with Westcott referring to these as "vast forest castles".

Westcott was appointed surveyor general of Florida by President Millard Fillmore in 1853. Amid rising tensions between the army and the Seminole, Westcott continued his predecessor's policy of conducting surveys within the buffer zone bordering Seminole territory. He viewed this as a non-violent way to end hostilities by pressuring the Seminole to move deeper into the swamps, as opposed to the forced removal advocated by frontier settlers. His method was supported by Florida governor James E. Broome and United States secretary of war Jefferson Davis, who ordered the surveying of the Everglades in 1854. Westcott was to prioritize surveying townships which were likely to attract settlers and land speculators for their agricultural or timber potential. On April 27, 1854, Westcott ordered his deputy John Jackson to survey land on Lake Okeechobee and the Kissimmee River, a neutral area which had been an important hunting ground for the Seminole. Jackson's group suffered from disease, incompetency, poor weather, and constant harassment from the Seminole. (Note: In a letter to Westcott, Jackson notes: "The Indians were watching our movements, ever after our crossing Charlipopka Creek and [...] thence to Lake Istokpoga they set the woods on fire about us frequently; [...] in the end I caught one of them reconnoitering our camp".) The following year, other surveyors in the same region had their horses stolen by the Seminole.

This work continued through 1855, with the army also becoming involved in surveying the region in anticipation of another war. Westcott provided surveys and maps to Captain John Charles Casey, whose soldiers were surveying the Big Cypress swamp via Cape Romano. On December 20, 1855, a group of soldiers were attacked by the Seminole, beginning the Third Seminole War. Westcott immediately recalled his deputies – four of whom were in the field at the war's onset – and suspended all surveys on February 1, 1856, until the Seminole were "removed or exterminated". Westcott left office in 1858.

=== 1858 United States House of Representatives election ===
Westcott – formerly a member of the Whig Party and then the Know Nothings – ran for the United States House of Representatives in the 1858 election as an Independent Democrat. His opponent was incumbent George Sydney Hawkins, a member of the Florida Democratic Party's radical faction, which Westcott was opposed to. Westcott campaigned on "cheap money [and] cheap land", as well as compensation for militiamen who served during the Seminole wars. He also opposed the use of party conventions for the selection of nominees, calling it "undemocratic". The bulk of Westcott's support came from former Whigs and Know Nothings, as well as farmers and frontiersmen, and his campaign was supported strongly in East and South Florida. Despite this, Westcott was unable to make inroads in West Florida and was defeated by Hawkins, receiving 4,064 votes compared to Hawkins's 6,471.

In 1859, following a split among the radicals over a proposed railroad, Westcott suggested merging his independent faction with Governor Madison S. Perry's radical faction to oust the other radicals and establish a moderate party platform. However, the radicals reunified in the lead-up to the 1860 election, and Westcott's independents were largely discredited.

== Later life ==
=== American Civil War ===
During the American Civil War, Westcott joined the Confederate States Army. He became captain of a company of partisan rangers, and later Company A of the 2nd Florida Infantry Battalion. On October 14, 1863, he was placed in command of Fort Brooke in the town of Tampa. Two days later, he commanded Confederate forces in the Battle of Fort Brooke. Two Union gunboats, the USS Adela and the USS Tahoma bombarded the fort. The following night, 140 Union soldiers led by Master T. R. Harris and guided by James H. Thompson landed at Ballast Point and marched to the Hillsborough River to achieve their main objective: the burning of two Confederate blockade runners, the steamship Scottish Chief and the sloop Kate Dale. Confederate forces scuttled the steamship A. B. Noyes to prevent its capture. Westcott was alerted to the attack by fleeing sailors and led a sortie, surprising the Union force as they were preparing to board their ships. Six Confederate soldiers were killed and seven were captured, while Union losses were three killed and five captured.

In early 1864, Westcott's company was ordered to Virginia to reinforce General Robert E. Lee's army, leaving Tampa virtually defenseless. Union forces captured and disarmed Fort Brooke without opposition on May 5, 1864. Westcott and his men arrived at Hanover Junction in Virginia on May 18, 1864, and participated in the Battle of Cold Harbor as part of Brigadier General Joseph Finegan's Florida Brigade. In June 1864, the 2nd Florida Battalion was reorganized into the 10th Florida Infantry Regiment. Westcott was promoted to the rank of major and placed in command of Company I. The regiment participated in the Siege of Petersburg and the Battle of Appomattox Court House, where they surrendered on April 9, 1865.

=== Business career and death ===
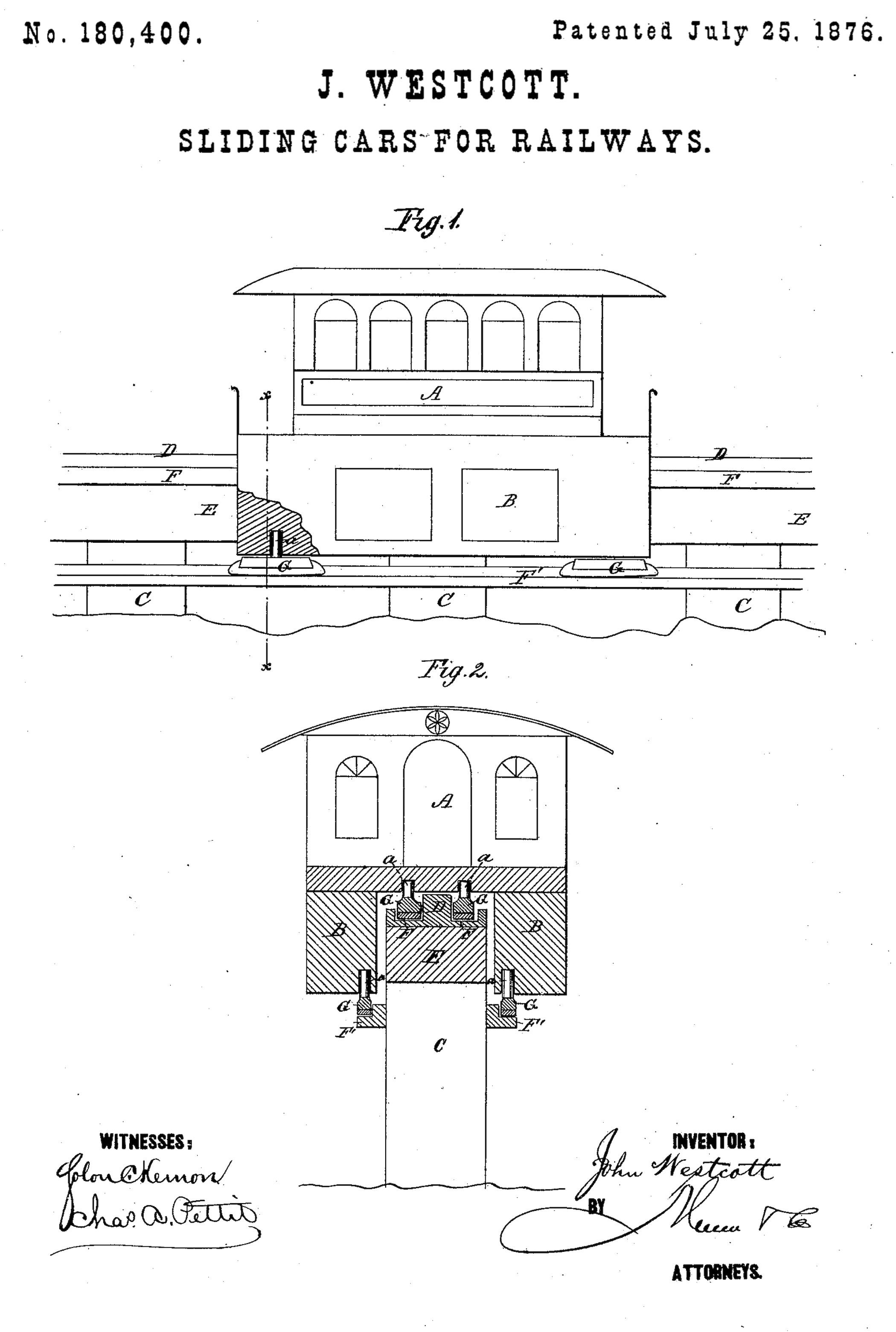
Westcott's 1876 monorail patent design

In his later life, Westcott moved to St. Augustine and played an important role in the development of Florida's transportation infrastructure. In 1858 – prior to the Civil War – Westcott established the St. Johns River Railroad, which stretched 15 miles from St. Augustine to the settlement of Tocoi on the St. Johns River. Writer Rowland H. Rerick describes the railroad as being "of a primitive nature", with horse-drawn power and strap-iron rails. The fare was $2 (equivalent to $74 in 2025), an "exorbitant" cost for the time. Westcott defended the fare by stating "that there was no other road in the United States where a man could ride so long a time for that money". In 1859, Florida's state engineer Francis L. Dancy criticized the construction process and convinced Governor Perry to withhold the railroad company's bonds, though this action was reversed by a court order. The railroad was rebuilt after the Civil War with improved rails and a locomotive engine. In 1870, the railroad company was sold to William Backhouse Astor Jr., with Westcott joining the board of directors.

At the 1876 Centennial Exposition, Westcott exhibited a model of his patented design for a monorail – which he called a "saddlebag railroad". In 1879, Westcott was again elected to the Florida House of Representatives, representing St. Johns County as a Democrat. During his one term in office, Westcott was the chairman of the Committee on Railroads and Canals. In this role, Westcott worked on legislation with Samuel E. Hope regarding the expansion of Florida's railroad and canal systems. He was also one of Florida's delegates to the 1876 Democratic National Convention, where he was a member of the Committee on Resolutions and supported the candidacy of Samuel J. Tilden. At age 78, he was the oldest member of the 1885 Florida constitutional convention.

In 1881, Westcott incorporated and became the first president of the Florida Coast Line Canal and Transportation Company. The company was authorized by the state legislature to "dredge a series of canals to create an inland waterway along the length of [Florida's] Atlantic coast". For every mile dredged, the state deeded the company 3,840 acres of public land to incentivize development. Operations began slow, with the company only dredging 26 miles before running out of money in 1885. As a result, Westcott brought on a number of investors – including Jay Cooke – to finance the project, and two of its previous directors were ousted. In the subsequent years, the company's dredging operations became faster and it was deeded 345,972 acres of land by the state in 1890. Westcott would serve as the company's president until his death on December 31, 1888.

== Publications ==
- Westcott, John (1888). De Soto in Florida: His Route From Tampa Bay to St. Marks. Palatka: Palatka News Publishing Company.
