= List of United States political families (W) =

The following is an alphabetical list of political families in the United States whose last name begins with W.

== The Wades ==
- Benjamin F. Wade (1800–1878), Prosecuting Attorney of Ashtabula County, Ohio 1835–37; Ohio State Senator 1837-1839-1841-1843; Circuit Court Judge in Ohio 1847–51; U.S. Senator from Ohio 1851–69. Brother of Edward Wade.
- Edward Wade (1802–1866), Justice of the Peace in Ashtabula County, Ohio 1831; Prosecuting Attorney of Ashtabula County, Ohio 1833; U.S. Representative from Ohio 1853–61. Brother of Benjamin F. Wade.

== The Wadsworths ==
- James Wadsworth (1730–1816), Continental Congress 1784
- Jeremiah Wadsworth (1743–1804), Continental Congress 1788, United States House of Representatives 1789–95, Connecticut House of Representatives 1795
- Frederick Wadsworth (1786–1869), mayor of Akron, Ohio 1852
- James Wadsworth (1819–1891), mayor of Buffalo, New York 1851–52, New York State Senate 1856–59
- Philip Wadsworth (1832–1901), Connecticut House of Representatives 1895–97
- James Wolcott Wadsworth (1846–1926), New York State Assembly 1878–79, New York State Comptroller 1880–81, United States House of Representatives 1881–85 & 1891–1907
  - James Wolcott Wadsworth Jr. (1877–1952), son of James Wolcott Wadsworth, New York State Assembly 1905–10, United States Senator 1915–27, United States House of Representatives 1933–51
    - James Jeremiah Wadsworth (1905–1984), son of James Wolcott Wadsworth Jr., New York State Assembly 1932–41, United States Ambassador to the United Nations 1960–61
- George Wadsworth (1893–1958), United States Ambassador to Italy 1941, Lebanon & Syria 1944–47, Iraq 1947–48, Turkey & Czechoslovakia 1948–52, and Saudi Arabia & North Yemen 1954–58

== The Waggonners ==
- Joe Waggonner (1918–2007), U.S. representative from Louisiana's 4th congressional district 1961–79
- W. E. "Willie" Waggonner (1905–1976), sheriff of Bossier Parish, Louisiana, 1948–76, brother of Joe Waggonner

== The Wagners ==
- Robert F. Wagner (1877–1953), New York Assemblyman 1905–08, New York State Senator 1909–18, acting Lieutenant Governor of New York 1913–14, delegate to the New York Constitutional Convention 1915 1938, delegate to the Republican National Convention 1916 1936 1940 1944, Justice of the New York Supreme Court 1919–26, U.S. Senator from New York 1927–49. Father of Robert F. Wagner Jr.
  - Robert F. Wagner Jr. (1910–1991), New York Assemblyman 1937–41, Borough President of Manhattan 1950–53, delegate to the Democratic National Convention 1952 1956 1960 1964, Mayor of New York City 1954–65, U.S. Ambassador to Spain 1968–69, candidate for Democratic nomination for Mayor of New York City 1969 1973, U.S. Ambassador to the Vatican. Son of Robert F. Wagner.

== The Waihees ==
- John D. Waihee III (born 1946), delegate to the Hawaii Constitutional Convention 1978, Hawaii State Representative 1981–82, Lieutenant Governor of Hawaii 1983–86, Governor of Hawaii 1986–94, Democratic National Committeeman 2004, delegate to the Democratic National Convention 2004 2008. Father of Jennifer Waihee.
  - Jennifer Waihee, candidate for Hawaii State Representative 2004. Daughter of John D. Waihee III.

== The Waites ==
- Henry Matson Waite (1787–1869), Connecticut State Assemblyman, Connecticut State Senator, Chief Justice of the Connecticut Supreme Court.
  - Morrison Waite (1816–1888), Chief Justice of the United States 1874–88. Son of Henry Matson Waite.

== The Walbridges ==
- Henry S. Walbridge (1801–1869), New York Assemblyman 1829 1846, Ithaca, New York Councilman; U.S. Representative from New York 1851–53; Judge of Tompkins County, New York 1859–68. Cousin of Hiram Walbridge.
- Hiram Walbridge (1821–1870), Buffalo, New York Alderman; U.S. Representative from New York 1853–55; candidate for U.S. Representative from New York 1862. Cousin of Henry S. Walbridge.

== The Walbridges of Michigan, Missouri, and New York ==
- Ebenezer W. Walbridge (1779–1856), New York Assemblyman 1816–17 1819–20. First cousin twice removed of Davis S. Walbridge.
  - David S. Walbridge (1802–1868), Michigan State Representative 1848, Michigan State Senator, Chairman of the Michigan Republican Convention 1854, U.S. Representative from Michigan 1855–59, Postmaster of Kalamazoo, Michigan. First cousin twice removed of Ebenezer W. Walbridge.
    - Cyrus Walbridge (1849–1921), Mayor of St. Louis, Missouri 1893–97. First cousin four times removed of Ebenezer W. Walbridge.
      - Henry E. Walbridge, delegate to the Michigan Constitutional Convention 1907 1908. Third cousin once removed of David S. Walbridge.

== The Waldens ==
- Paul E. Walden, Oregon State Representative. Father of Gregory P. Walden.
  - Gregory P. Walden (born 1957), Oregon State Representative 1989–95, Oregon State Senator 1995–97, U.S. Representative from Oregon 1999–2021. Son of Paul E. Walden.

== The Walkers ==
- John Williams Walker (1783–1823), Alabama Territory Representative, delegate to the Alabama Constitutional Convention 1819, U.S. Senator from Alabama 1819–22. Father of Percy Walker, LeRoy Pope Walker, and Richard Wilde Walker.
  - Percy Walker (1812–1880), Alabama State Attorney, Alabama State Representative 1839 1847 1853, U.S. Representative from Alabama 1855–57. Son of John Williams Walker.
  - LeRoy Pope Walker (1817–1884), Alabama State Representative 1843–44 1847–51 1853, delegate to the Democratic National Convention 1860 1876, Confederate States Secretary of War 1861 delegate to the Alabama Constitutional Convention 1875. Son of John Williams Walker.
  - Richard Wilde Walker (1823–1874), member of the Alabama Legislature 1851 1855, Justice of the Alabama Supreme Court 1859, Confederate Representative from Alabama 1961–1862, Confederate Senator from Alabama 1864–65. Son of John Williams Walker.
    - Richard Wilde Walker Jr. (1857–1936), Justice of the Alabama Supreme Court 1891–1914, U.S. Court of Appeals Judge in Alabama 1914–36. Son of Richard Wilde Walker.
      - Richard Walker Bolling (1916–1991), U.S. Representative from Missouri 1959–83. Great-great grandson of John Williams Walker.

== The Walkers of Arkansas and Kentucky ==
- George Walker (1763–1819), Kentucky State Senator 1810–14, U.S. Senator from Kentucky 1814. Brother of David Walker (Kentucky).
- David Walker (1763–1820), Clerk of Logan County, Kentucky; Kentucky State Representative 1793–96; U.S. Representative from Kentucky 1817–20. Brother of George Walker.
- David Walker (1806–1879), Member of Arkansas Territory Assembly 1835; Arkansas Senate 1840–44; Arkansas Supreme Court 1849–55 and 1866-68. Cousin to James D. Walker.
  - James D. Walker (1830–1906), Circuit Court Judge in Arkansas, Solicitor General of Arkansas, U.S. Senator from Arkansas 1879–85. Grandson of David Walker (Kentucky) and cousin to David Walker (Arkansas).

NOTE: James D. Walker was also the nephew of U.S. Senator John McLean and U.S. Representative Finis McLean and cousin of U.S. Senator Wilkinson Call.

== The Walkers of New York ==
- William Walker (1842–1916), New York Assemblyman 1892–93. Father of James J. Walker.
  - James J. Walker (1881–1946), New York Assemblyman 1910–14, New York State Senator 1915–25, delegate to the Democratic National Convention 1924 1928 1932, Mayor of New York City 1926–32. Son of William Walker.

== The Walkers of Virginia ==
- John Walker (1744–1809), Delegate to the Continental Congress from Virginia 1780, U.S. Senator from Virginia 1790. Brother of Francis Walker.
- Francis Walker (1764–1806), member of the Virginia Legislature, Virginia State Court Judge, U.S. Representative from Virginia 1793–95. Brother of John Walker.

== The Walkers of Wisconsin ==
- George H. Walker (1811–1866), member of the Wisconsin Territory Legislature 1842–45, Register of the Milwaukee, Wisconsin Land Office 1845–49; Milwaukee, Wisconsin Alderman; Mayor of Milwaukee, Wisconsin 1851 1853; Wisconsin Assemblyman 1851. Brother of Isaac P. Walker.
- Isaac P. Walker (1815–1872), Illinois State Representative, member of Wisconsin Legislature 1847–48, U.S. Senator from Wisconsin 1848–55. Brother of George H. Walker.

== The Walls and Vrooms ==
- Garret D. Wall (1783–1850), New Jersey Assemblyman 1827, U.S. District Attorney of New Jersey 1829, U.S. Senator from New Jersey 1835–41, Judge of the New Jersey Court of Errors and Appeals 1848–50. Father of James Walter Wall.
  - James Walter Wall (1820–1872), Mayor of Burlington, New Jersey 1850; candidate for U.S. Representative from New Jersey 1854; U.S. Senator from New Jersey 1863. Son of Garret D. Wall.
  - Peter Dumont Vroom (1791–1873), member of the New Jersey Legislature 1826–29, Governor of New Jersey 1829–32 1833–36, U.S. Representative from New Jersey 1839–41, delegate to the New Jersey Constitutional Convention 1844, U.S. Minister to Prussia 1853–57. Son-in-law of Garret D. Wall.
    - Garrett D.W. Vroom, delegate to the Democratic National Convention 1876, Mayor of Trenton, New Jersey 1881–84. Son of Peter Dumont Vroom.

== The Wallaces ==
- David Wallace (1799–1859), Indiana State Representative 1829–31, Lieutenant Governor of Indiana 1831–37, Governor of Indiana 1837–40, U.S. Representative from Indiana 1842–44, delegate to the Indiana Constitutional Convention 1850, Court of Common Pleas Judge in Indiana 1856–59. Brother of Benjamin Franklin Wallace and William H. Wallace.
- Benjamin Franklin Wallace (1804–1887), Indiana State Senator 1831–33, Iowa Territory Councilman, Iowa State Representative. Brother of David Wallace and William H. Wallace.
- William H. Wallace (1811–1879), candidate for U.S. Senate from Iowa 1848, Governor of Washington Territory 1861, U.S. Congressional Delegate from Washington Territory 1861–63, Governor of Idaho Territory 1863–64, U.S. Congressional Delegate from Idaho Territory 1864–65, Probate Court Judge in Washington Territory 1865–79. Brother of David Wallace and Benjamin Franklin Wallace.
  - Lewis Wallace (1827–1905), Governor of New Mexico Territory 1878–81, U.S. Minister to Ottoman Empire 1881–85. Son of David Wallace.

NOTE: Lewis Wallace was also nephew of Indiana State Senator Charles H. Test.

== The Wallaces and Cantwells ==
- Colonel James Cantwell (1810–1862): Ohio state legislator. Farmer and soldier, killed at the Second Battle of Bull Run. Grandfather of Henry Cantwell Wallace.
  - Henry Cantwell Wallace (1866–1924): Secretary of Agriculture, 1921–24. Grandson of James Cantwell. Father of Henry Agard Wallace.
    - Henry Agard Wallace (1888–1965): Secretary of Agriculture, 1933–40; Vice President of the United States, 1941–45; Secretary of Commerce, 1945–46; Progressive Party candidate for President in 1948. Son of Henry Cantwell Wallace.

== The Wallers ==
- William L. Waller, Sr. (1926–2011), Governor of Mississippi 1972–76, candidate for the Democratic nomination for U.S. Senate from Mississippi 1978, candidate for Governor of Mississippi 1987. Father of William L. Waller Jr.
  - William L. Waller Jr. (born 1952), Municipal Judge in Jackson, Mississippi; Justice of the Mississippi Supreme Court 1998–2019; Chief Justice of the Mississippi Supreme Court 2009–2019. Son of William L. Waller, Sr..

== The Walshes ==
- William F. Walsh (1912–2011), Mayor of Syracuse, New York 1961–69; delegate to the Republican National Convention 1968; U.S. Representative from New York 1973–79. Father of James T. Walsh.
  - James T. Walsh (born 1947), U.S. Representative from New York 1989–2009. Son of William F. Walsh.
    - Ben Walsh (born 1979), Incumbent Mayor of Syracuse, New York.

== The Waltons ==
- John Walton (1738–1783), delegate to the Continental Congress from Georgia 1778, Surveyor of Richmond County, Georgia. Brother of George Walton.
- George Walton (1749/1750–1804), Governor of Georgia 1775 1779–80 1789–90, Chief Justice of the Georgia Supreme Court 1783–89, U.S. Senator from Georgia 1795–96. Brother of John Walton.
- Matthew Walton (1750–1819), delegate to the Kentucky Constitutional Convention 1792, Kentucky State Representative 1792 1795 1808, U.S. Representative from Kentucky 1803–07. Cousin of John Walton and George Walton.

== The Waltons of Missouri ==
- Elbert Walton (born 1942), member of the Missouri House of Representatives 1979–1993. Husband of Juanita Head Walton
- Juanita Head Walton (1954–2016), Missouri state representative 2000–2008. Wife of Elbert Walton.

== The Wamplers ==
- William C. Wampler (1926–2012), U.S. Representative from Virginia 1953–55 1967–83. Father of William C. Wampler Jr..
  - William C. Wampler Jr. (born 1959), Virginia State Senator 1988–2012. Son of William C. Wampler.

== The Wantons ==
- William Wanton, Governor of Rhode Island Colony 1732–33.
  - Joseph Wanton (1705–1780), Governor of Rhode Island Colony 1769–75. Son of William Wanton.
    - Joseph Wanton Jr. (1730–1780), Deputy Governor of Rhode Island Colony 1764 1767. Son of Joseph Wanton.

== The Wards ==
- Artemas Ward (1727–1800), Assessor of Worcester County, Massachusetts; Justice of the Peace in Massachusetts; Massachusetts Court Justice 1776–77; President of the Massachusetts Executive Council 1777–79; Massachusetts State Representative 1779–85; Delegate to the Continental Congress from Massachusetts 1780–81; U.S. Representative from Massachusetts 1791–95. Father of Artemas Ward Jr.
  - Artemas Ward Jr. (1762–1847), U.S. Representative from Massachusetts 1813–17. Son of Artemas Ward.

== The Wards of New York ==
- Aaron Ward (1790–1867), District Attorney of Westchester County, New York; U.S. Representative from New York 1825–29 1831–37 1841–43; delegate to the New York Constitutional Convention 1846; candidate for Treasurer of New York 1855. Uncle of Elijah Ward.
  - Elijah Ward (1816–1882), Judge Advocate General of New York 1853–55, delegate to the Democratic National Convention 1856, U.S. Representative from New York 1857–59 1861–65 1875–77. Nephew of Aaron Ward.

== The Wards of New York (II) ==
- Hamilton Ward, Sr. (1829–1898), District Attorney of Allegany County, New York 1856–59; U.S. Representative from New York 1865–71; Attorney General of New York 1880–81; Justice of the New York Supreme Court 1891–98. Father of Hamilton Ward Jr.
  - Hamilton Ward Jr. (1871–1932), Attorney General of New York 1928–32. Son of Hamilton Ward, Sr.

== The Warners ==
- Samuel L. Warner (1828–1893), Connecticut State Representative 1858, Mayor of Middletown, Connecticut 1862–66; delegate to the Republican National Convention 1864 1888 1892; U.S. Representative from Connecticut 1865–67. Brother of Levi Warner.
- Levi Warner (1831–1911), U.S. Representative from Connecticut 1876–79. Brother of Samuel L. Warner.

== The Warners of Michigan ==
- P. Dean Warner, Michigan State Representative 1851–52 1865–66 1867–68, delegate to the Michigan Constitutional Convention 1867, Michigan State Senator 1869–70. Father of Fred M. Warner.
  - Fred M. Warner (1865–1923), Michigan State Senator 1895–98, Michigan Secretary of State 1901–04, Governor of Michigan 1905–10. Son of P. Dean Warner.

== The Washingtons ==
- George Washington (1732–1799), member of Virginia House of Burgesses, member of Continental Congress from Virginia, commander in chief of continental forces in the American Revolutionary War, delegate and president of the Philadelphia Convention of 1787, President of the United States.
- Samuel Washington (1734–1781), brother of George Washington, Justice of the Peace, County Magistrate, County Sheriff, Militia Officer.
- John Augustine Washington (1736–1787), brother of George Washington, Member of County Committee of Safety and Chairman of County Committee for Relief of Boston during the Revolutionary War, Town Trustee.
- Charles Washington (1738–1799), Stafford County, Virginia Magistrate. Brother of George Washington.
  - Bushrod Washington (1762–1829), nephew of George Washington, son of John Augustine Washington, member of Virginia House of Delegates, United States Supreme Court associate justice.
  - John Parke Custis (1754–1781), Virginia House Delegate 1778–81. Stepson of George Washington.
    - George Corbin Washington (1789–1854), grandnephew of George Washington, United States Representative from Maryland.
      - Eugenia Scholay Washington (1838–1900), American historian, civil servant, and a founder of the lineage societies Daughters of the American Revolution and Daughters of the Founders and Patriots of America. Washington was a great-grandniece of George Washington.
        - George Thomas Washington (1908–1971), Judge of the United States Court of Appeals for the District of Columbia Circuit 1949–65. Descendant of Samuel Washington.

NOTE: George Washington was also uncle by marriage of U.S. Representative Burwell Bassett and granduncle by marriage of U.S. Secretary of War Charles Magill Conrad. John Parke Custis was also son-in-law of Maryland Colony Governor Charles Calvert. Appeals Court Judge William Ball Gilbert was related to George Washington's mother Mary Ball Washington.

== The Watkinses ==
- J. D. Watkins (1828–1895), state senator and judge from Webster Parish in northwestern Louisiana' father of John T. Watkins and Lynn Kyle Watkins
- John T. Watkins (1854–1925), state court judge and U.S. Representative for Louisiana's 4th congressional district from 1905 to 1921, son of John D. Watkins and brother of Lynn Kyle Watkins
- Lynn Kyle Watkins, state circuit court judge in Louisiana prior to 1912, son of John D. Watkins and brother of John T. Watkins

== The Wattersons ==
- Harvey Magee Watterson (1811–1891), Tennessee State Representative 1835, U.S. Representative from Tennessee 1839–43, Tennessee State Senator 1845–47, delegate to the Democratic National Convention 1860. Father of Henry Watterson.
  - Henry Watterson (1840–1921), delegate to the Democratic National Convention 1876, U.S. Representative from Kentucky 1876–77. Son of Harvey McGee Watterson.

NOTE: Henry Watterson was also nephew of U.S. Senator Stanley Matthews.

== The Waynes ==
- Anthony Wayne (1745–1796), member of the Pennsylvania Legislature 1774–80 1784, U.S. Representative from Georgia 1791–92. Father of Isaac Wayne.
  - Isaac Wayne (1772–1852), Pennsylvania State Representative 1799–1801 1806, Pennsylvania State Senator 1810, U.S. Representative from Pennsylvania 1823–25. Son of Anthony Wayne.

== The Weadocks ==
- Thomas A.E. Weadock (1850–1938), Prosecuting Attorney of Bay County, Michigan 1877–78; Mayor of Bay City, Michigan 1883–84; U.S. Representative from Michigan 1891–95; delegate to the Democratic National Convention 1896; candidate for Justice of the Michigan Supreme Court 1904 1928; candidate for U.S. Senate from Michigan 1930; Justice of the Michigan Supreme Court 1933. Brother of George Weadock.
- George W. Weadock (1853–1937), Mayor of Saginaw, Michigan 1890–92; delegate to the Democratic National Convention 1928; candidate for Justice of the Michigan Supreme Court 1929. Brother of Thomas A.E. Weadock.
  - G. Leo Weadock (1881–1932), Michigan State Senator 1913–14. Son of George W. Weadock.
    - George W. Weadock II (1908–1971), Michigan State Senator 1937–38. Son of G. Leo Weadock.

NOTE: Thomas A.E. Weadock and George W. Weadock were also brothers-in-law of U.S. Representatives John C. Tarsney and Timothy E. Tarsney.

== The Weavers ==
- Archibald J. Weaver (1843–1887), delegate to the Nebraska Constitutional Convention 1871 1875, District Attorney in Nebraska, Judge in Nebraska, U.S. Representative from Nebraska 1883–87, candidate for U.S. Senate from Nebraska 1887. Father of Arthur J. Weaver.
  - Arthur J. Weaver (1873–1945), Nebraska State Representative 1899, delegate to the Nebraska Constitutional Convention 1919 1920, Governor of Nebraska 1929–31, delegate to the Republican National Convention 1932. Son of Archibald J. Weaver.
    - Arthur J. Weaver Jr. (1912–1996), delegate to the Republican National Convention 1944, 1948, 1952, 1956, 1960. Son of Governor Arthur J. Weaver. Appointed Special Ambassador by President Dwight Eisenhower to the independence ceremonies of The Republic of Togo, Africa, April 25–28, 1960.
    - Phillip Hart Weaver (1919–1989), U.S. Representative from Nebraska 1955–63. Son of Arthur J. Weaver.

== The Webbs ==
- James L. Webb (1854–1930), Mayor of Shelby, North Carolina State Senator, United States Postal Inspector, President Pro Tempore of the North Carolina Senate, Justice on the North Carolina Supreme Court. Father of Fay Webb-Gardner. Brother of Edwin Y. Webb.
  - Fay Webb-Gardner (1885–1969), First Lady of North Carolina. Daughter of James L. Webb. Wife of Oliver Max Gardner.
- Edwin Y. Webb (1872–1955), U.S. Congressman, Chairman of the United States House Committee on the Judiciary, North Carolina Western District Senior Court Judge. Brother of James L. Webb.

== The Websters ==
- Daniel Webster (1782–1852), U.S. Representative from New Hampshire 1813–17, U.S. Representative from Massachusetts 1823–27, U.S. Senator from Massachusetts 1827–41 1845–50, candidate for the Whig Party nomination for President of the United States 1836 1852, U.S. Secretary of State 1841–43 1850–52. Relative of Daniel Webster.
  - Daniel Webster (born 1949), Florida State Representative 1980–98, Florida State Senator 1998–2008, U.S. Representative from Florida 2011–present. Relative of Daniel Webster.

== The Websters of North Carolina ==
- James Jefferson Webster (1898–1965), Rockingham County Commissioner, gubernatorial campaigner for North Carolina Governor W. Kerr Scott. Father of John Ray Webster. Grandfather of James Jefferson Webster III. Great-grandfather of Elizabeth Webster Mitchell.
  - Mary Elizabeth Comer Webster (1928–2008), Vice Chair of the Rockingham County Democratic Party Executive Committee, delegate to the 1980 Democratic National Convention, and campaign assistant for Congressman L. Richardson Preyer. Daughter-in-law of James Jefferson Webster and mother of James Jefferson Webster III.
  - John Ray Webster (born 1942), military officer, veterinarian, competitive checkers player, and musician. Son of James Jefferson Webster. Uncle of James Jefferson Webster III. Granduncle of Elizabeth Webster Mitchell.
    - James Jefferson Webster III (born 1966), competitive checkers player. Co-Chair of the Rockingham County Democratic Party. Son of Mary Elizabeth Comer Webster and grandson of James Jefferson Webster.
      - Elizabeth Webster Mitchell (1972–1998), school teacher, competitive shag dancer. Great-granddaughter of James Jefferson Webster.

== The Weeks ==
- John W. Weeks (1781–1853), U.S. Representative from New Hampshire 1829–33. Granduncle of John W. Weeks.
  - Edgar Weeks (1839–1904), Prosecuting Attorney of Mount Clemens, Michigan 1867–70; Probate Court Judge of Macomb County, Michigan 1870–76; candidate for U.S. Representative from Michigan 1884; U.S. Representative from Michigan 1899–1903. Cousin of John W. Weeks.
    - John W. Weeks (1860–1926), Newton, Massachusetts Alderman 1899–1902; Mayor of Newton, Massachusetts 1902–03; U.S. Representative from Massachusetts 1905–13; U.S. Senator from Massachusetts 1913–19; candidate for the Republican nomination for President of the United States 1916; delegate to the Republican National Convention 1916; Republican National Committeeman 1920; U.S. Secretary of War 1921–25. Grandnephew of John W. Weeks.
      - Sinclair Weeks (1893–1972), Newton, Massachusetts Alderman 1923–30; Mayor of Newton, Massachusetts 1930–35; delegate to the Republican National Convention 1932 1940 1944 1948 1952 1956; Chairman of the Massachusetts Republican Party 1937; Republican National Committeeman 1941–53; U.S. Senator from Massachusetts 1944; U.S. Secretary of Commerce 1953–58. Son of John W. Weeks.

== The Wells ==
- Greeley Wells (1920–2014), mayor of Harding Township, New Jersey 1963
- Marion G. Wells (1926–2016), conservative activist and board member, The Heritage Foundation
- Dick Wells (1922–2003), Florida Tax commissioner 1979–1987

== The Wells of Louisiana ==
- Samuel Wells II, delegate to the Louisiana Constitutional Convention 1811. Father of James Madison Wells and Thomas Jefferson Wells.
  - James Madison Wells (1808–1899), Sheriff of Rapides Parish, Louisiana; Lieutenant Governor of Louisiana 1864–65; Governor of Louisiana 1865–67; Surveyor of the Port of New Orleans, Louisiana 1874–80. Son of Samuel Wells II.
  - Thomas Jefferson Wells, Louisiana state representative for Rapides Parish, and candidate for Governor of Louisiana 1859. Son of Samuel Wells II.

== The Wells of Missouri ==
- Erastus Wells (1823–1893), U.S. Representative from Missouri 1869–77 1879–81. Father of Rolla Wells.
  - Rolla Wells (1856–1944), Mayor of St. Louis, Missouri 1901–09. Son of Erastus Wells.

== The Wentworths ==
- John Wentworth Jr. (1745–1787), New Hampshire State Representative 1776–80, Justice of the New Hampshire Supreme Court 1776–84, Delegate to the Continental Congress from New Hampshire 1778, New Hampshire State Senator 1784–86. Grandfather of John Wentworth.
  - John Wentworth (1815–1888), U.S. Representative from Illinois 1843–51 1853–55 1865–67, Mayor of Chicago, Illinois 1857–58 1860–61; delegate to the Illinois Constitutional Convention 1861. Grandson of John Wentworth Jr.

== The Wests ==
- Francis West (1586–1634), Governor of Virginia Colony 1627–29. Brother of John West.
- John West (1590–1659), Governor of Virginia Colony 1635–37. Brother of Francis West.
  - John West (1632–1691), member of the Virginia Colony House of Burgesses 1685. Son of John West.
    - Nathaniel West (1665–1723), member of the Virginia Colony House of Burgesses 1703–05. Son of John West.
    - John West III (1676–1734), Justice of King and Queen County, Virginia; Sheriff of King and Queen County, Virginia; member of the Virginia Colony House of Burgesses; Justice of the Peace in Virginia Colony. Son of John West.

NOTE: Nathaniel West's daughter, Unity, was married to William Dandridge, who was uncle of Martha Washington, the wife of U.S. President George Washington. Unity and William were also direct ancestor of Edith Wilson, wife of U.S. President Woodrow Wilson.

== The Westcotts ==
- James Westcott (1802–1880), Secretary of the Florida Territory 1830–34, Attorney General of Florida Territory 1834–36, U.S. Senator from Florida 1845–49. Father of James Westcott III. Brother of John Westcott.
  - James Westcott III (1839–1887), Florida State Representative, Attorney General of Florida 1868, Justice of the Florida Supreme Court 1868–85, candidate for U.S. Senate from Florida 1872. Son of James Westcott.
- John S. Westcott (1807–1888), Surveyor General of Florida (1853–58), major in the Confederate States Army. Florida State Representative (1846, 1879), President of the Florida Coast Line Canal and Transportation Company (1881–1888). Brother of James Westcott.

== The Wheats ==
- Roscoe D. Wheat (1876–1951), delegate to the Republican National Convention 1936. Second cousin of William H. Wheat.
- William H. Wheat (1879–1944), candidate for U.S. Representative from Illinois 1936, U.S. Representative from Illinois 1939–44. Second cousin of Roscoe D. Wheat.

== The Whites ==
- Thomas White, member of the Maryland Legislature, Delaware Assemblyman, Chief Justice of the Kent County, Delaware Court of Common Pleas; delegate to the Delaware Constitutional Convention 1776 1792. Father of Samuel White.
  - Samuel White (1770–1809), U.S. Senator from Delaware 1801–09. Son of Thomas White.

== The Whites of California ==
- William F. White, delegate to the California Constitutional Convention 1878 1879, candidate for Governor of California 1879. Father of Stephen M. White.
  - Stephen M. White (1853–1901), District Attorney of Los Angeles County, California 1883–84; California State Senator 1887–91; acting Lieutenant Governor of California 1887–91; candidate for U.S. Senate from California 1890; U.S. Senator from California 1893–99. Son of William F. White.

NOTE: William F. White was also cousin by marriage of U.S. Senator Stephen R. Mallory.

== The Whites of Colorado ==
- Al White, member of the Colorado Senate and the Colorado House of Representatives
  - Jean White, member of the Colorado Senate. Wife of Al White.

== The Whites of Idaho ==
- Compton I. White (1877–1956), delegate to the Democratic National Convention 1928 1932 1836, U.S. Representative from Idaho 1933–47 1949–51. Father of Compton I. White Jr.
  - Compton I. White Jr. (1920–1998), Mayor of Clark Fork, Idaho 1958–62; candidate for Democratic nomination for U.S. Senate from Idaho 1960; U.S. Representative from Idaho 1963–67. Son of Compton I. White.

== The Whites of Kentucky ==
- John White (1802–1845), Kentucky State Representative 1832, U.S. Representative from Kentucky 1835–43, Speaker of the U.S. House of Representatives 1841–43. Cousin of Addison White.
- Addison White (1824–1909), U.S. Representative from Kentucky 1851–53. Cousin of John White.
  - John D. White (1849–1920), U.S. Representative from Kentucky 1875–77 1881–75, Chairman of the Kentucky Republican Convention 1879, Kentucky State Representative 1879–80, delegate to the Republican National Convention 1880, candidate for U.S. Senate from Kentucky 1881, candidate for Governor of Kentucky 1903, candidate for Kentucky Court of Appeals Judge 1912. Nephew of John White.

== The Whites of Louisiana ==
- James White (1749–1809), North Carolina State Representative 1785, Delegate to the Continental Congress from North Carolina 1786–88, U.S. Congressional Delegate from Southwest Territory 1794–96, Judge of the District of Louisiana, Judge of the Territory of Orleans. Father of Edward Douglas White Sr.
  - Edward Douglass White Sr. (1795–1847), Judge of the New Orleans, Louisiana Municipal Court; U.S. Representative from Louisiana 1829–34 1939–1843; Governor of Louisiana 1835–39. Son of James White.
    - Edward Douglass White (1845–1921), Louisiana State Senator 1874, Justice of the Louisiana Supreme Court 1879–80, U.S. Senator from Louisiana 1891–94, Justice of the U.S. Supreme Court 1894–1910, Chief Justice of the U.S. Supreme Court 1910–21. Son of Edward Douglass White Sr.

== The Whites of Tennessee ==
- Hugh Lawson White (1773–1840), Justice of the Tennessee Supreme Court 1801, Tennessee State Senator 1807, U.S. Attorney in Tennessee 1808–09, U.S. Senator from Tennessee 1825–40, candidate for President of the United States 1836. Father of Samuel Davies Carrick White.
  - Samuel Davies Carrick White (1825–1860), Mayor of Knoxville, Tennessee 1857. Son of Hugh Lawson White.

== The Whitfields of North Carolina, Mississippi and Florida ==
- William Whitfield II (1715–1795) — Member of the North Carolina General Assembly from Dobbs County (1761–1762). In 1779 he was a member of Governor Richard Caswell's Council, and a Justice of Peace for Johnston County, North Carolina. Captain of the 6th Virginia Regiment during the American Revolutionary War.
  - William Whitfield III (1743–1817) — Fought in the Battle of Moore's Creek Bridge during the American Revolutionary War. Appointed Justice of the peace for Dobbs County in 1778.
  - Benjamin Bryan Whitfield (1754–1817) — Member of North Carolina General Assembly representing from Dobbs County, 1786–87. Served in the Continental Army during the Revolutionary War as a General.
    - Nathan Bryan Whitfield (1799–1868) — Member of North Carolina General Assembly from Lenoir County, 1821; Member of North Carolina Senate from Lenoir County, 1822–23, 1825, 1827. General of the North Carolina militia during the war.
    - James Bryan Whitfield (1809–1841) — Member of North Carolina Senate of the 17th District, 1840–41.
      - Nathan Bryan Whitfield (1835–1914) — Member of North Carolina House of Representatives from Lenoir County, North Carolina (1858–59, 1891–92). Colonel in the Union Army during the American Civil War.
        - James B. Whitfield (1860–1948) — 11th State Treasurer of Florida 1897–1903, 17th Attorney General of Florida 1903–04, and Chief Justice of the Supreme Court of Florida. Grandfather of Dr. Randolph Whitfield, Jr, brother-in-law of astronaut Rusty Schweickart.

Others:

- James Whitfield (1791–1875) — 18th Governor of Mississippi, 1851–52. Member of Mississippi State House of Representatives, 1842–50, 1858–62; member of Mississippi State Senate, 1851. Grandnephew of William Whitfield II.
  - Henry L. Whitfield (1868–1927) — 41st Governor of Mississippi, Delegate to the 1924 Democratic National Convention from Mississippi. Great-great-great grandson of William Whitfield II.
- Needham Bryan (1749–1787) — Member of North Carolina Senate from Johnston County, 1777–79; member of North Carolina General Assembly from Johnston County, 1786. First cousin of Benjamin Bryan Whitfield.
  - Lovard Bryan (1769–1798) — Member of North Carolina General Assembly from Johnston County, 1791–92.
  - David Hardy Bryan (1753–1820) — Member of North Carolina General Assembly from Johnston County, 1781, 1785, 1790; member of North Carolina Senate from Johnston County, 1783, 1792–93. First cousin once removed of Nathan Bryan Whitfield (1799–1868).
  - Joseph Hunter Bryan (1782–1839) — Member of North Carolina General Assembly, 1804–05, 1807–09; U.S. Representative from North Carolina, (Republican, 2nd District) at the fourteenth and fifteenth Congress, 1815–19. Third cousin of David Hardy Bryan.
    - Henry Hunter Bryan (1786–1835) — U.S. Representative from Tennessee (Republican), (at-large) at the sixteenth Congress, 1819–21. Third cousin of David Hardy Bryan.
      - Auburn Bascomb Bryan (1873–1942) — Alternate delegate of North Carolina to the 1924 Republican National Convention. Second great-grandnephew of David Hardy Bryan.

== The Whitehills and Wises ==
- John Whitehill (1729–1815), Judge in Pennsylvania 1777, member of the Pennsylvania State Legislature 1780, U.S. Representative from Pennsylvania 1803–07.
- Robert Whitehill (1738–1813), member of the Pennsylvania State Legislature, U.S. Representative from Pennsylvania 1805–13. Brother of John Whitehill.
  - James Whitehill (1762–1822), Judge in Pennsylvania 1811, U.S. Representative from Pennsylvania 1813. Son of John Whitehill.
    - John C. Kunkel (1898–1970), U.S. Representative from Pennsylvania 1939–51 1961–67, candidate for U.S. Senator from Pennsylvania 1950. Great great grandson of Robert Whitehill.
- Jonathan Sergeant (1746–1793), Delegate to the Continental Congress from Pennsylvania 1776, Pennsylvania Attorney General 1777.
  - John Sergeant (1779–1852), U.S. Representative from Pennsylvania 1815–23 1827–29 1837–41, candidate for Vice President of the United States 1832. Son of Jonathan Sergeant, great grandfather of John C. Kunkel.
    - Henry A. Wise (1806–1876), U.S. Representative from Virginia 1833–44, U.S. Minister to Brazil 1844–47, delegate to the Virginia Constitutional Convention 1850, Governor of Virginia 1856–59. Son-in-law of John Sergeant.
      - Richard Alsop Wise (1843–1900), member of the Virginia State Legislature, U.S. Representative from Virginia 1898–99 1900. Son of Henry A. Wise.
      - John Sergeant Wise (1846–1913), U.S. District Attorney for Eastern District of Virginia 1882–83, U.S. Representative from Virginia 1883–85, candidate for Governor of Virginia 1885. Son of Henry A. Wise.
      - George D. Wise (1831–1908), U.S. Representative from Virginia 1881–85. Nephew of Henry A. Wise.

NOTE: John C. Kunkel was also grandson of U.S. Representative John Christian Kunkel (1876–1870).

== The Whitehouses ==
- E. Sheldon Whitehouse (1883–1965), U.S Minister to Guatemala 1930–33, U.S. Minister to Colombia 1933–34. Father of Charles S. Whitehouse.
  - Charles S. Whitehouse (1921–2001), U.S. Minister to Laos 1973–75, U.S. Minister to Thailand 1975. Son of E. Sheldon Whitehouse.
    - Sheldon Whitehouse (born 1955), U.S. Attorney of Rhode Island 1994–98, Attorney General of Rhode Island 1999–2003, candidate for Democratic nomination for Governor of Rhode Island 2002, U.S. Senator from Rhode Island 2007–present. Son of Charles S. Whitehouse.

NOTE: E. Sheldon Whitehouse was also the grandson-in-law of California Assemblyman Charles Crocker and the brother-in-law of U.S. Ambassador Winthrop W. Aldrich.

== The Whitings ==
- William Whiting (1841–1911), Massachusetts State Senator 1873, Mayor of Holyoke, Massachusetts 1878; U.S. Representative from Massachusetts 1883–89. Father of William F. Whiting.
  - William F. Whiting (1864–1936), delegate to the Republican National Convention 1920 1924 1928, U.S. Secretary of Commerce 1928–29. Son of William Whiting.

== The Whitneys ==
- Henry B. Payne (1810–1896), Ohio State Senator 1849–51, candidate for U.S. Senate from Ohio 1851, candidate for Governor of Ohio 1857, U.S. Representative from Ohio 1875–77, member of the 1876 Electoral Commission, candidate for President of the United States 1880 1884, U.S. Senator from Ohio 1885–91. Father-in-law of William Collins Whitney.
  - William Collins Whitney (1841–1904), Corporation Counsel of New York 1875–82, U.S. Secretary of the Navy 1885–89. Son-in-law of Henry B. Payne.
    - Willard Dickerman Straight (1880–1918), American Vice-Counsel to Korea, American Vice-Counsel to Cuba. Son-in-law of William Collins Whitney.
    - Frances P. Bolton (1885–1977), U.S. Representative from Ohio 1940–69. Niece by marriage of William Collins Whitney.
    - Chester C. Bolton (1882–1939), Lyndhurst, Ohio Councilman 1918–21; Ohio State Senator 1923–28; delegate to the Republican National Convention 1928; U.S. Representative from Ohio 1929–37 1939, Chairman of the Republican Congressional Campaign Committee 1934 1936. Husband of Frances P. Bolton.
      - John Hay Whitney (1904–1982), U.S. Ambassador to the United Kingdom 1957–61. Grandson of William Collins Whitney.
      - Oliver P. Bolton (1917–1972), U.S. Representative from Ohio 1953–57 1963–65. Son of Frances P. Bolton and Chester C. Bolton.

NOTE: William Collins Whitney was also father-in-law of British politician Almeric Paget, and Whitney's son, Payne Whitney, was son-in-law of U.S. Secretary of State John Hay.

== The Whittleseys ==
- Elisha Whittlesey (1783–1863), Ohio State Representative 1820–21, U.S. Representative from Ohio 1823–38, Comptroller of the U.S. Treasury 1849–57 1861–63. Cousin of Thomas T. Whittlesey and Frederick Whittelsey.
- Thomas T. Whittlesey (1798–1868), U.S. Representative from Connecticut 1836–39, Wisconsin State Senator 1853–54. Cousin of Elisha Whittlesey and Frederick Whittlesey.
- Frederick Whittlesey (1799–1851), Treasurer of Monroe County, New York 1829–30; U.S. Representative from New York 1831–35; Justice of the New York Supreme Court 1847–48. Cousin of Elisha Whittlesey and Thomas T. Whittlesey.
  - William A. Whittlesey (1796–1866), Ohio State Representative 1839–40, U.S. Representative from Ohio 1849–51, Mayor of Marietta, Ohio 1856 1860 1862. Nephew of Elisha Whittlesey.

== The Wickliffes ==
- Charles A. Wickliffe (1788–1869), Kentucky State Representative 1814–23 1834–36, U.S. Representative from Kentucky 1823–33 1861–63, Lieutenant Governor of Kentucky 1836–39, Governor of Kentucky 1839–40, U.S. Postmaster General 1841–45. Father of Robert C. Wickliffe.
  - Robert C. Wickliffe (1819–1895), Louisiana State Senator 1851–54, Lieutenant Governor of Louisiana 1854–56, Governor of Louisiana 1856–60, candidate to the Democratic National Convention 1876 1884, candidate for Lieutenant Governor of Louisiana 1882. Son of Charles A. Wickliffe.
  - David Levy Yulee (1810–1886), U.S. Representative from Florida 1841–45, U.S. Senator from Florida 1845–51 1855–61. Son-in-law of Charles A. Wickliffe.
    - Robert Charles Wickliffe (1874–1912), District Attorney for Louisiana 1902–06, U.S. Representative from Louisiana 1909–12. Grandson of Charles A. Wickliffe.
    - J.C.W. Beckham (1869–1940), Kentucky State Representative, Lieutenant Governor of Kentucky 1899–1900, Governor of Kentucky 1900–07, candidate for U.S. Senate from Kentucky 1908 1936, U.S. Senator from Kentucky 1915–21, candidate for Governor of Kentucky 1927. Nephew of Robert C. Wickliffe.

NOTE: Robert C. Wickliffe was also son-in-law of U.S. Representative John Bennett Dawson and nephew by marriage of Louisiana Governor Isaac Johnson.

== The Wiederspahns and Lummises ==
- J. Arling Wiederspahn (1916–2007), coroner of Laramie County, Wyoming 1963–79; member of the Laramie County Community College trustees 1970–85, Democrat, father of Alvin Wiederspahn and father-in-law of Cynthia Lummis
  - Alvin Wiederspahn (1949–2014), member of the Wyoming House of Representatives 1979–84, member of the Wyoming State Senate 1985–88, Democrat, son of J. Arling Wiederspahn and husband of Cynthia Lummis
  - Cynthia Lummis (born 1954), member of the Wyoming House of Representatives 1979–83 and 1985–93; member of the Wyoming Senate 1993–95; Wyoming state treasurer 1999–2007, and U.S. Representative from Wyoming 2009–2017, U.S. Senator from Wyoming 2021–present, daughter-in-law of J. Arling Wiederspahn and widow of Alvin Wiederspahn, Republican

== The Wilbers ==
- David Wilber (1820–1890), member of the Otsego County, New York Board of Supervisors 1858–59 1862 1865–66; U.S. Representative from New York 1873–75 1879–81 1887–90; delegate to the Republican National Convention 1880 1888. Father of David F. Wilber.
  - David F. Wilber (1859–1928), U.S. Representative from New York 1895–99, U.S. Consul to Barbados 1903–05, U.S. Consul General to Singapore 1905–07, U.S. Consul General to Halifax, Nova Scotia 1907–09; U.S. Consul General to Kobe, Japan 1909–10; U.S. Consul General to Vancouver, British Columbia, Canada 1910–13; U.S. Consul General to Zurich, Germany 1913–15; U.S. Consul General to Genoa, Italy 1915–21; U.S. Consul General to Auckland, New Zealand 1922–23; U.S. Consul General to Wellington, New Zealand 1922–23; New York Republican Committeeman 1924–27. Son of David Wilber.

== The Wilburs ==
- Curtis D. Wilbur (1867–1954), Judge of the California Superior Court 1903–18, Justice of the California Supreme Court 1918–23, Chief Justice of the California Supreme Court 1923–24, U.S. Secretary of the Navy 1924–29, U.S. Judge for Court of Appeals in California 1929–45. Brother of Ray Lyman Wilbur.
- Ray Lyman Wilbur (1875–1949), U.S. Secretary of the Interior 1929–33. Brother of Curtis D. Wilbur.

== The Wilcoxes ==
- Jeduthun Wilcox (1768–1838), New Hampshire State Representative 1809–11, U.S. Representative from New Hampshire 1813–17. Father of Leonard Wilcox.
  - Leonard Wilcox (1799–1850), New Hampshire State Representative 1828–34, Judge of the New Hampshire Superior Court 1838–40, U.S. Senator from New Hampshire 1842–43. Son of Jeduthun Wilcox.

== The Wileys ==
- Ariosto A. Wiley (1848–1908), Alabama State Representative 1884–85 1888–89 1896–97, Alabama State Senator 1890–93 1898–99, U.S. Representative from Alabama 1901–08. Brother of Oliver C. Wiley.
- Oliver C. Wiley (1851–1917), Troy, Alabama Councilman; Pike County, Alabama Democratic Committeeman 1884–86; Alabama Democratic Committeeman 1888; U.S. Representative from Alabama 1908–09. Brother of Ariosto A. Wiley.

== The Wilkins ==
- William Wilkins (1779–1865), U.S. Representative from Pennsylvania 1829 1843–44, U.S. Senator from Pennsylvania 1831–34, candidate for Vice President of the United States 1832, U.S. Secretary of War 1844–45. Brother of Ross Wilkins.
  - Ross Wilkins (1799–1872), Pennsylvania State Representative 1829–30, Judge of the Michigan Territory 1832–36, U.S. District Judge of Michigan 1836–70. Nephew of William Wilkins.
  - Wilkins F. Tannehill (1787–1858), Mayor of Nashville, Tennessee 1825–27. Nephew of William Wilkins.

== The Wilkins of New York ==
- James W. Wilkin (1762–1845), New York Assemblyman 1800 1808–09, New York State Senator 1801–04 1811–14, U.S. Representative from New York 1815–19, candidate for U.S. Senate from New York 1815, Clerk of Orange County, New York 1819–21; Treasurer of Orange County, New York. Father of Samuel J. Wilkin.
  - Samuel J. Wilkin (1793–1866), New York Assemblyman 1824–25, U.S. Representative from New York 1831–33, candidate for Lieutenant Governor of New York 1844, New York State Senator 1848–49. Son of James W. Wilkin.

== The Williams of Maine ==
- Reuel Williams (1783–1862), member of the Maine Legislature 1812–29 1832 1848, U.S. Senator from Maine 1837–43. Father of Joseph H. Williams.
  - Joseph H. Williams (1814–1896), Maine State Senator 1857, Governor of Maine 1857–58, Maine State Representative 1864–66 1873, candidate for Governor of Maine 1873. Son of Reuel Williams.

== The Williams of California and Kentucky ==
- Sherrod Williams (1804–1876), Kentucky State Representative 1829–34 1846, U.S. Representative from Kentucky 1835–41. Father of Thomas H. Williams and George E. Williams.
  - Thomas H. Williams (1828–1886), Attorney General of California 1858–62. Son of Sherrod Williams.
  - George E. Williams (1835–1899), California Assemblyman 1873–75. Son of Sherrod Williams.

== The Williams of Montana ==
- Pat Williams (born 1937), Montana State Representative 1967–69, U.S. Representative from Montana 1979–97.
- Carol Williams (born 1949), Montana State Representative 1999–2000, Montana State Senator 2004–12.
  - Whitney Williams (born 1970), candidate for Governor of Montana 2020. Daughter of Pat Williams and Carol Williams.

== The Williams of North Carolina ==
- Robert Williams (1773–1836), North Carolina State Senator 1792–1803, U.S. Representative from North Carolina 1797–1803. Brother of Marmaduke Williams.
- Marmaduke Williams (1774–1850), North Carolina State Senator 1802, U.S. Representative from North Carolina 1803–09, delegate to the Alabama Constitutional Convention 1819, candidate for Governor of Alabama 1819, Alabama State Representative 1821–39, Judge of Tuscaloosa County, Alabama 1832–42. Brother of Robert Williams.
- John Williams (1778–1837), U.S. Senator from Tennessee 1815–23, U.S. Chargé d'Affaires to the Central American Federation 1825–26, U.S. Chargé d'Affaires to Guatemala 1826, Tennessee State Senator 1827–28. Cousin of Robert Williams and Marmaduke Williams.
- Lewis Williams (1782–1842), member of the North Carolina House of Commons 1813–14, U.S. Representative from North Carolina 1815–42. Cousin of Robert Williams and Marmaduke Williams.
  - Joseph Lanier Williams (1810–1865), U.S. Representative from Tennessee 1837–43, Judge of U.S. District Court of the Dakota Territory. Son of John Williams.

NOTE: Robert Williams was also son-in-law of U.S. Representative Joseph Winston, brother-in-law of Mississippi Supreme Court Justice Louis L. Winston and Mississippi Lieutenant Governor Fountain Winston. He and Marmaduke Williams were also second cousins by marriage of U.S. Representative Matthew Clay.

== The Wilsons ==
- Ephraim King Wilson (1771–1834), U.S. Representative from Maryland 1827–31. Father of Williams Sydney Wilson and Ephraim King Wilson II.
  - William Sydney Wilson (1816–1862), member of the Mississippi Legislature 1858–59 1860–61, delegate to the Democratic National Convention 1860, Delegate to the Confederate States Provisional Congress 1861. Son of Ephraim King Wilson.
  - Ephraim King Wilson II (1821–1891), Maryland House Delegate 1847, U.S. Representative from Maryland 1873–75, U.S. Senator from Maryland 1885–91. Son of Ephraim King Wilson.
    - John Walter Smith (1845–1925), Maryland State Senator 1890 1894 1898, candidate for Democratic nominations for U.S. Senate from Maryland 1891, U.S. Representative from Maryland 1899–1900, Governor of Maryland 1900–04, U.S. Senator from Maryland 1908–21. Adoptive son of Ephraim King Wilson II.

== The Wilsons of Indiana ==
- John Wilson (1796–1864), Indiana State Representative 1840–41. Father of James Wilson.
  - James Wilson (1825–1867), U.S. Representative from Indiana 1857–61, U.S. Minister to Venezuela 1866–67. Son of John Wilson.
  - Samuel Campbell Dunn (1809–1881), Indiana State Representative 1839–40. Nephew of John Wilson.
  - William McKee Dunn (1814–1887), Indiana State Representative 1848–49, delegate to the Indiana Constitutional Convention 1850 1851, U.S. Representative from Indiana 1859–63. Nephew of John Wilson.
  - David Maxwell Dunn, Indiana State Representative 1855. Nephew of John Wilson.
    - John L. Wilson (1850–1912), Indiana State Representative 1881, U.S. Representative from Washington 1889–95, U.S. Senator from Washington 1895–99. Son of James Wilson.

NOTE: Samuel Campbell Dunn, William McKee Dunn, and David Maxwell Dunn were also sons of Indiana State Senator Williamson Dunn and nephews of Indiana State Senator David Hervey Maxwell and Indiana State Representative Edward Russell Maxwell.

== The Wilsons of Minnesota and Virginia ==
- Isaac Griffin (1756–1827), Justice of the Peace in Pennsylvania, Pennsylvania State Representative, U.S. Representative from Pennsylvania 1812–17. Great-grandfather of Eugene McLanahan Wilson.
  - Thomas Wilson (1765–1826), Virginia State Senator 1792–95 1800–04, Virginia House Delegate 1799–1800 1816–17, U.S. Representative from Virginia 1811–13. Father of Edgar C. Wilson.
    - Edgar C. Wilson (1800–1860), U.S. Representative from Virginia 1833–35, Prosecuting Attorney of Marion County, Virginia. Son of Thomas Wilson.
      - Eugene McLanahan Wilson (1833–1890), U.S. Attorney of Minnesota 1857–61, U.S. Representative from Minnesota 1869–71, candidate for U.S. Representative from Minnesota 1874, delegate to the Democratic National Convention 1876, Minnesota State Senator 1878–79, candidate for Governor of Minnesota 1888. Son of Edgar C. Wilson.
        - Charles H. Griffin (1926–1989), U.S. Representative from Mississippi 1968–73. Great-great grandson of Isaac Griffin.

== The Wilsons of New Hampshire ==
- James Wilson I (1766–1839), New Hampshire State Representative 1803–08 1812–14, U.S. Representative from New Hampshire 1809–11. Father of James Wilson II.
  - James Wilson II (1797–1881), New Hampshire State Representative 1825–37 1840 1846, candidate for Governor of New Hampshire 1835 1838, delegate to the Whig National Convention 1840, Surveyor of Public Lands of Wisconsin Territory 1841–45, Surveyor of Public Lands of Iowa Territory 1841–45, U.S. Representative from New Hampshire 1847–50. Son of James Wilson I.

== The Wilsons of New York ==
- Charles H. Wilson, candidate for New York Assemblyman 1912. Father of Malcolm Wilson.
  - Malcolm Wilson (1914–2000), New York Assemblyman 1939–58, Lieutenant Governor of New York 1959–73, Governor of New York 1973–75, delegate to the Republican National Convention 1984. Son of Charles H. Wilson.

== The Wilsons of Ohio ==
- Charles A. Wilson (1943–2013), Ohio State Representative 1997–2004, Ohio State Senator 2005–07, U.S. Representative from Ohio 2007–2011. Father of Jason Wilson.
  - Jason Wilson (born 1968), Ohio State Senator 2007–2011. Son of Charles A. Wilson.

== The Wilsons and McAdoos ==
- Woodrow Wilson (1856–1924), Governor of New Jersey 1911–13, President of the United States, 1913–21. Former father-in-law of William Gibbs McAdoo.
  - William Gibbs McAdoo (1863–1941), U.S. Secretary of the Treasury 1913–18, candidate for the Democratic nomination for President, 1920 and 1924, U.S. Senator from California 1933–38. Former son-in-law of Woodrow Wilson.

== The Wilsons of South Carolina ==
- Joe Wilson (born 1947), South Carolina State Senator 1985–2001, U.S. Representative from South Carolina 2001–present. Adoptive father of Alan Wilson.
  - Alan Wilson (born 1973) Governor of South Carolina, 2026-, Attorney General of South Carolina 2011–2026. Adoptive son of Joe Wilson.

== The Winslows ==
- Edward Winslow (1595–1655), Governor of Plymouth Colony 1633–34 1636–37 1644–45. Father of Josiah Winslow.
  - Josiah Winslow (1628–1680), Governor of Plymouth Colony 1673–80. Son of Edward Winslow.

== The Winthrops ==
- John Winthrop (1588–1649), Governor of Massachusetts Bay Colony 1630–34 1637–40 1642–44 1646–49. Father of John Winthrop.
  - John Winthrop (1606–1676), Magistrate of Connecticut Colony, Governor of Connecticut Colony 1657–58 1659–76, Deputy Governor of Connecticut Colony 1658. Son of John Winthrop.
    - Fitz-John Winthrop (1639–1707), Governor of Connecticut, Son of John Winthrop

NOTE: John Winthrop's great-granddaughter, Rebecca, was also daughter-in-law of Connecticut Governor Gurdon Saltonstall.

== The Weeks ==
- John W. Weeks (1781–1853), U.S. Representative from New Hampshire 1829–33. Granduncle of Edgar Weeks and John W. Weeks.
  - Edgar Weeks (1839–1904), U.S. Representative from Michigan 1899–1903. Grandnephew of John W. Weeks.
  - John W. Weeks (1860–1926), U.S. Representative from Massachusetts 1905–13, U.S. Senator from Massachusetts 1913–19, U.S. Secretary of War 1921–25. Grandnephew of John W. Weeks.
    - Sinclair Weeks (1893–1972), Mayor of Newton, Massachusetts 1930–35; U.S. Senator from Massachusetts 1944; U.S. Secretary of Commerce 1953–58. Son of John W. Weeks.

== The Wirths ==
- Timothy E. Wirth (born 1939), U.S. Representative from Colorado 1975–87, U.S. Senator from Colorado 1987–93. Uncle of Peter Wirth.
  - Peter Wirth (born 1961), member of New Mexico Legislature. Nephew of Timothy E. Wirth.

== The Wisners ==
- Henry Wisner (1720–1790) Orange County Representative to the Province of New York Assembly 1759–70, Member of the New York Provincial Congress 1775, delegate from New York to the Continental Congress
- Henry Wisner III (1743–1810), nephew of Henry Wisner, Assemblyman in the 9th New York State Legislature
- John Wheeler Wisner (1801–1852), first Judge of Chemung County.
- Moses Wisner (1815–1863) 12th Governor of Michigan 1859–61.
  - Charles H. Wisner (1850–1913), son of Moses; circuit court judge from Flint, Michigan.
- Chauncey Wisner (1835–1894), served as Mayor of East Saginaw, Michigan and served representing Saginaw County in both the Michigan House of Representatives and Michigan Senate.
- Clinton Wheeler Wisner (1856–1904) three term Mayor of the Village of Warwick, New York
- Frank Wisner (1909–1965) Head of Office of Strategic Services operations in southeastern Europe at the end of World War II 1944–45 and head of the Directorate of Plans of the Central Intelligence Agency in 1952.
- Frank G. Wisner (born 1938) Ambassador to Zambia 1979–82, Ambassador to Egypt 1986–91, Ambassador to Philippines 1991–92, and Ambassador to India 1994–97

== The Wolcotts and Griswolds ==
- Roger Wolcott (1679–1767), Governor of Connecticut Colony 1750–54.
  - Oliver Wolcott (1726–1797), Judge in Connecticut 1774–86, Delegate to the Continental Congress from Connecticut 1774–78 1780–84, Deputy Governor of Connecticut 1786–96, Governor of Connecticut 1796–97. Son of Roger Wolcott.
  - William Pitkin (1694–1769), Governor of Connecticut 1766–69. First cousin once removed of Roger Wolcott.
  - Matthew Griswold (1714–1799), Deputy Governor of Connecticut 1769–84, Governor of Connecticut 1784–86. Son-in-law of Roger Wolcott.
    - Oliver Wolcott Jr. (1760–1833), Connecticut Comptroller 1788–90, U.S. Secretary of the Treasury 1795–1800, Judge of the United States Circuit Court for the Second Circuit 1801–02, Governor of Connecticut 1817–27, delegate to the Connecticut Constitutional Convention 1818. Son of Oliver Wolcott, Sr.
    - Roger Griswold (1762–1812), U.S. Representative from Connecticut 1795–1805, Judge in Connecticut 1807–09, Deputy Governor of Connecticut 1809–11, Governor of Connecticut 1811–12. Son of Matthew Griswold.
    - Oliver Ellsworth (1745–1807), Delegate to the Continental Congress from Connecticut 1777–1884, Judge in Connecticut 1785–89, U.S. Senator from Connecticut 1789–96, Chief Justice of the U.S. Supreme Court 1796–1800. Grandnephew by marriage of Roger Wolcott.
      - William W. Ellsworth (1791–1868), U.S. Representative from Connecticut 1829–34, Connecticut State Senator 1836, Governor of Connecticut 1838–42, Judge in Connecticut 1847–61. Son of Oliver Ellsworth.
        - Matthew Griswold (1833–1919), member of the Pennsylvania Legislature, U.S. Representative from Pennsylvania 1891–93 1895–97. Grandson of Roger Griswold.

== The Wollmans ==
- Roger Leland Wollman (born 1934), Judge of the South Dakota Supreme Court 1971–85, Judge of the United States Court of Appeals for the Eighth Circuit 1985–2018.
- Harvey L. Wollman (1935–2022), South Dakota State Senator 1969–71, Lieutenant Governor of South Dakota 1975–78, Governor of South Dakota 1978–79. Brother of Roger Leland Wollman.

== The Woodhulls ==
- Nathaniel Woodhull (1722–1776), leader of the New York Provincial Congress and brother-in-law of William Floyd, signer of the Declaration of Independence
- John Tennant Woodhull, MD (1786–1869), Member of the New Jersey General Assembly 1821–27
- Caleb Smith Woodhull (1792–1866), 70th Mayor of New York City 1849–51,
- Jesse Woodhull (1735–1795), Member of New York Senate 1779–81, Delegate to the New York Convention to ratify the United States Constitution 1788.
- Nathaniel Woodhull Howell (1770–1851), a Federalist Representative to the 13th United States Congress 1813–15,
  - Albert Smith White (1803–1864), nephew of Nathaniel Howell, Whig Representative and Senator from Indiana to the 25th United States Congress.
- Addis Emmet Woodhull, (1840–1922) Mayor of Valparaiso, Indiana 1898–1902
  - Fletcher Mathews Haight (1799–1866), a descendant of Nathaniel Woodhull and Sarah Smith, was the Jacksonian Assemblyman to the 57th New York State Legislature in 1834, and a Federal Judge nominated by President Abraham Lincoln on the United States District Court for the Southern District of California 1861–66.
  - Henry Huntly Haight (1825–1878), son of Fletcher Mathews Haight, was the tenth governor of California 1867–71.
    - Hamilton Fish (1808–1893), a descendant of Richard Woodhull through his daughter Ruth, was a Governor of New York and a United States senator who launched his own political family (Fish family), which includes members of the Kean political family.
    - Ellsworth Bunker (1894–1984), a descendant of Sarah Woodhull (sister of Nathaniel Woodhull), was United States Ambassador to Argentina 1951, United States Ambassador to Italy 1952, United States Ambassador to India 1956, U.S. Ambassador to the Organization of American States 1964–66, and United States Ambassador to South Vietnam 1967–73.
      - Victoria Woodhull (1838–1927), wife of Canning Woodhull, first female candidate for President of the United States in 1872
      - Nathaniel Woodhull "Nat" Hicks (1845–1907), a celebrated 1870s professional baseball player with Cincinnati Reds and other National Association teams, celebrated by baseball historian Bill James for invention of catchers mitt, which contributed to development of baseball gloves and viability of the sport.

== The Woods ==
- Fernando Wood (1812–1881), U.S. Representative from New York 1841–43 1863–65 1867–81, Mayor of New York City 1855–58 1860–62. Brother of Benjamin Wood.
- Benjamin Wood (1820–1900), U.S. Representative from New York 1861–65 1881–83, New York State Senator 1866–67. Brother of Fernando Wood.

== The Woods of Pennsylvania ==
- John Wood (1816–1898), U.S. Representative from Pennsylvania 1859–61. Uncle of Alan Wood Jr.
  - Alan Wood Jr. (1834–1902), U.S. Representative from Pennsylvania 1875–77. Nephew of John Wood.

== The Woodburys ==
- Levi Woodbury (1789–1851), Justice of the New Hampshire Supreme Court 1816–23, Governor of New Hampshire 1823–24, New Hampshire State Representative 1825, U.S. Senator from New Hampshire 1825–31 1841–45, U.S. Secretary of the Navy 1831–34, U.S. Secretary of the Treasury 1834–41, Justice of the U.S. Supreme Court 1845–51, candidate for the Democratic nomination for President of the United States 1848. Father of Charles Levi Woodbury.
  - Charles Levi Woodbury, delegate to the Democratic National Convention 1856. Son of Levi Woodbury.

== The Woodrums ==
- Clifton A. Woodrum (1887–1950), U.S. Representative from Virginia 1923–45. Grandfather of Clifton A. Woodrum III.
  - Clifton A. Woodrum III (born 1938), delegate to the Democratic National Convention 1972, Chairman of the Virginia Democratic Party 1972–76, Virginia House Delegate. Grandson of Clifton A. Woodrum.

== The Woodses ==
- John Woods (1761–1816), Pennsylvania Supreme Executive Councilman 1794–86, Pennsylvania State Senator 1797, U.S. Representative from Pennsylvania 1815–16. Brother of Henry Woods.
- Henry Woods (1764–1826), U.S. Representative from Pennsylvania 1799–1803. Brother of Henry Woods.

== The Woodsons ==
- Samuel H. Woodson (1777–1827), U.S. Representative from Kentucky 1821–23, Kentucky State Representative 1825–26. First cousin of Silas Woodson.
- Silas Woodson (1819–1896), Kentucky State Representative 1842 1853–55, delegate to the Kentucky Constitutional Convention 1849, Missouri Secretary of State 1860–70, Governor of Missouri 1873–75, delegate to the Democratic National Convention 1876, Circuit Court Judge in Missouri 1881–96. First cousin of Samuel H. Woodson.
  - Tucker Woodson (1804–1874), Kentucky State Representative, Kentucky State Senator, Judge of Jessamine County, Kentucky. Son of Samuel H. Woodson.
  - David M. Woodson (1806–1877), Kentucky State Representative 1833, delegate to the Illinois Constitutional Convention 1847, Justice of the Illinois Supreme Court 1848, Circuit Court Judge in Illinois, delegate to the Democratic National Convention 1868. Son of Samuel H. Woodson.
  - Samuel H. Woodson (1815–1881), Missouri State Representative 1853–54, delegate to the Missouri Constitutional Convention 1855, U.S. Representative from Missouri 1857–61, Judge in Missouri 1875–81. Son of Samuel H. Woodson.
    - Daniel Woodson (1824–1894), Secretary of the Kansas Territory 1854–57, Governor of the Kansas Territory 1855, 1855, 1856, 1856, 1857. Third cousin twice removed of Samuel H. Woodson and Silas Woodson.
    - John M. Woodson, delegate to the Illinois Constitutional Convention 1862, Illinois State Senator 1867–69. Son of David M. Woodson.
    - John Archibald Woodson, Sheriff of Meagher County, Montana; member of the Montana Legislature. Third cousin twice removed of Samuel H. Woodson and Silas Woodson.
      - J. A. Woodson (1848–1908), Mayor of Little Rock, Arkansas 1895–1900. Third cousin three times removed of Samuel H. Woodson and Silas Woodson.
      - Urey Woodson (1859–1939), Democratic National Committeeman 1896–1912 1916–18 1924–28, Secretary of the Democratic National Committee 1904–12, Secretary of the Democratic National Convention 1912, delegate to the Democratic National Convention 1932. Third cousin three times removed of Samuel H. Woodson and Silas Woodson.

NOTE: Samuel H. Woodson, Silas Woodson, Daniel Woodson and James Archibald Woodson were also third cousins once removed of Missouri Governor Frederick Bates, U.S. Congressional Delegate James Woodson Bates and U.S. Attorney General Edward Bates.

== The Woodwards ==
- William Woodward (1762–1820), U.S. Representative from South Carolina 1815–17. Father of Joseph A. Woodward.
  - Joseph A. Woodward (1806–1885), member of the South Carolina Legislature, U.S. Representative from South Carolina 1843–53. Son of William Woodward.

== The Woodyards ==
- Henry D. Chapman, delegate to the West Virginia Constitutional Convention 1863. Father-in-law of William Woodyard.
  - William Woodyard, West Virginia State Senator 1883–90. Son-in-law of Henry D. Chapman.
    - Harry C. Woodyard (1867–1929), West Virginia State Senator 1899–1902, U.S. Representative from West Virginia 1903–11 1916–23 1925–27. Son of William Woodyard.
      - William Woodyard, West Virginia House Delegate 1927–28, West Virginia State Senator 1929–32, West Virginia Republican Executive Committeeman 1937–41. Son of Harry C. Woodyard.

== The Woolseys ==
- C. Meech Woolsey (1841–1924), Member of New York State Assembly 1871–72.
- R. James Woolsey Jr. (born 1941), Advisor to the United States delegation to the Strategic Arms Limitation Talks (SALT 1) 1969–70, Under Secretary of the Navy 1977–79, and Director of Central Intelligence 1993–95.
  - Sidney Breese (1800–1878), a descendant of George (Joris) Woolsey, progenitor of the Woolsey family in America. Appointed by President John Quincy Adams as United States Attorney for the State of Illinois 1827, Justice in the Illinois Supreme Court 1841, Democrat United States Senator from Illinois 1843–49, Speaker of the Illinois House of Representatives 1850–52, Justice of Supreme Court of Illinois 1841–43, 1857–78
  - George Hoadly, (1826–1902) a descendant of George (Joris) Woolsey, progenitor of the Woolsey family in America. Served as 36th Governor of Ohio

== The Workmans ==
- William H. Workman (1839–1918), Mayor of Los Angeles, California 1886–88. Father of Boyle Workman.
  - Boyle Workman (1868–1942), candidate for Mayor of Los Angeles, California 1929. Son of William H. Workman.
  - Margaret K. Workman, delegate to the Democratic National Convention 1940. Daughter-in-law of William H. Workman.

== The Workmans of South Carolina ==
- W. D. Workman Jr. (1914–1990), Republican nominee for U.S. Senate in 1962 and governor of South Carolina in 1982; newspaper and radio journalist, author of five books on the American South, father of Bill Workman
- William Douglas "Bill" Workman, III (1940–2019), mayor of Greenville, South Carolina 1983–95; economic development consultant; son of W. D. Workman Jr., resides in Walterboro

== The Worth, Daniels, and Bagley families ==
- Jonathan Worth, member of the North Carolina House of Representatives 1830–1843, member of the North Carolina Senate in 1843, North Carolina State Treasurer 1863–1865, 39th Governor of North Carolina 1865–1868
- Martitia Daniel Worth (1806–1874), First Lady of North Carolina 1865–1868. Wife of Jonathan Worth.
  - William Henry Bagley (1833–1886), clerk of the North Carolina Supreme Court 1869–1886, Superintendent-appointee of the United States Mint in Charlotte, member of the North Carolina Senate. Son-in-law of Jonathan Worth and Martitia Daniel Worth.
    - Addie Worth Bagley Daniels (1869–1943), suffragist. Daughter of William Henry Bagley. Granddaughter of Jonathan Worth.
    - Josephus Daniels (1862–1948), 41st United States Secretary of the Navy 1913–1921, 10th United States Ambassador to Mexico 1933–1941. Husband of Addie Worth Bagley Daniels
      - Jonathan Worth Daniels (1902–1981), 4th White House Press Secretary in 1945. Son of Addie Worth and Josephus Daniels.
    - Worth Bagley (1874–1898), officer in the United States Navy. Son of William Henry Bagley. Grandson of Jonathan Worth.
    - David Worth Bagley (1883–1960), admiral in the United States Navy. Son of William Henry Bagley. Grandson of Jonathan Worth.
      - David Harrington Bagley (1920–1992), admiral in the United States Navy. Son of David Worth Bagley.
      - Worth Harrington Bagley (1924–2016), four star admiral in the United States Navy, Commander in Chief United States Naval Forces Europe from 1973 to 1974, and Vice Chief of Naval Operations from 1974 to 1975. Son of David Worth Bagley.
      - Tennent Harrington Bagley (1925–2014), Central Intelligence Agency operations and counterintelligence officer. Son of David Worth Bagley.

== The Wrights ==
- Joseph A. Wright (1810–1867), Indiana State Representative 1833–38, Indiana State Senator 1838–42, U.S. Representative from Indiana 1843–45, Governor of Indiana 1849–57, U.S. Minister to Prussia 1857–61 1862–65, U.S. Senator from Indiana 1862–63. Brother of George G. Wright.
- George G. Wright (1820–1896), Prosecuting Attorney of Van Buren County, Iowa 1847–48; Iowa State Senator 1849–51; Justice of the Iowa Supreme Court 1854–70; U.S. Senator from Iowa 1871–77. Brother of Joseph A. Wright.

== The Wrights of Maryland ==
- Turbutt Wright (1741–1783), Maryland Assemblyman 1773–74 1781–82, delegate to the Maryland Constitutional Convention 1776, Delegate to the Continental Congress from Maryland 1782. Cousin of Robert Wright.
- Robert Wright (1752–1826), Maryland House Delegate 1784–86, Maryland State Senator 1801, U.S. Senator from Maryland 1801–06, Governor of Maryland 1806–09, Clerk of Queen Anne's County, Maryland 1810; U.S. Representative from Maryland 1810–17 1821–23. Cousin of Turbutt Wright.
  - Phillip Francis Thomas (1810–1890), delegate to the Maryland Constitutional Convention 1836, Maryland House Delegate 1838 1843–45 1863 1878–83, U.S. Representative from Maryland 1839–41 1875–77, Governor of Maryland 1848–51, U.S. Collector of Customs of Baltimore, Maryland 1853–60; U.S. Secretary of the Treasury 1860–61; candidate for U.S. Senate from Maryland 1878. Son-in-law of Robert Wright.

== The Wrights of Pennsylvania ==
- Myron Benjamin Wright (1847–1894), U.S. Representative from Pennsylvania 1889–94. Brother of Charles Frederick Wright.
- Charles Frederick Wright (1856–1925), delegate to the Republican National Convention 1896 1904 1908, U.S. Representative from Pennsylvania 1899–1905, Treasurer of Pennsylvania 1911–13, Commissioner of Public Service in Pennsylvania 1915–16. Brother of Myron Benjamin Wright.

== The Wrights of Tennessee ==
- Archibald W. Wright, Chief Justice of the Tennessee Supreme Court. Father of Luke E. Wright.
  - Luke E. Wright (1846–1922), Attorney General of Tennessee 1870–78, U.S. Ambassador to Japan 1906–07, U.S. Secretary of War 1908–09. Son of Archibald W. Wright.
