= John White (Kentucky politician) =

American lawyer and politician (1802–1845)

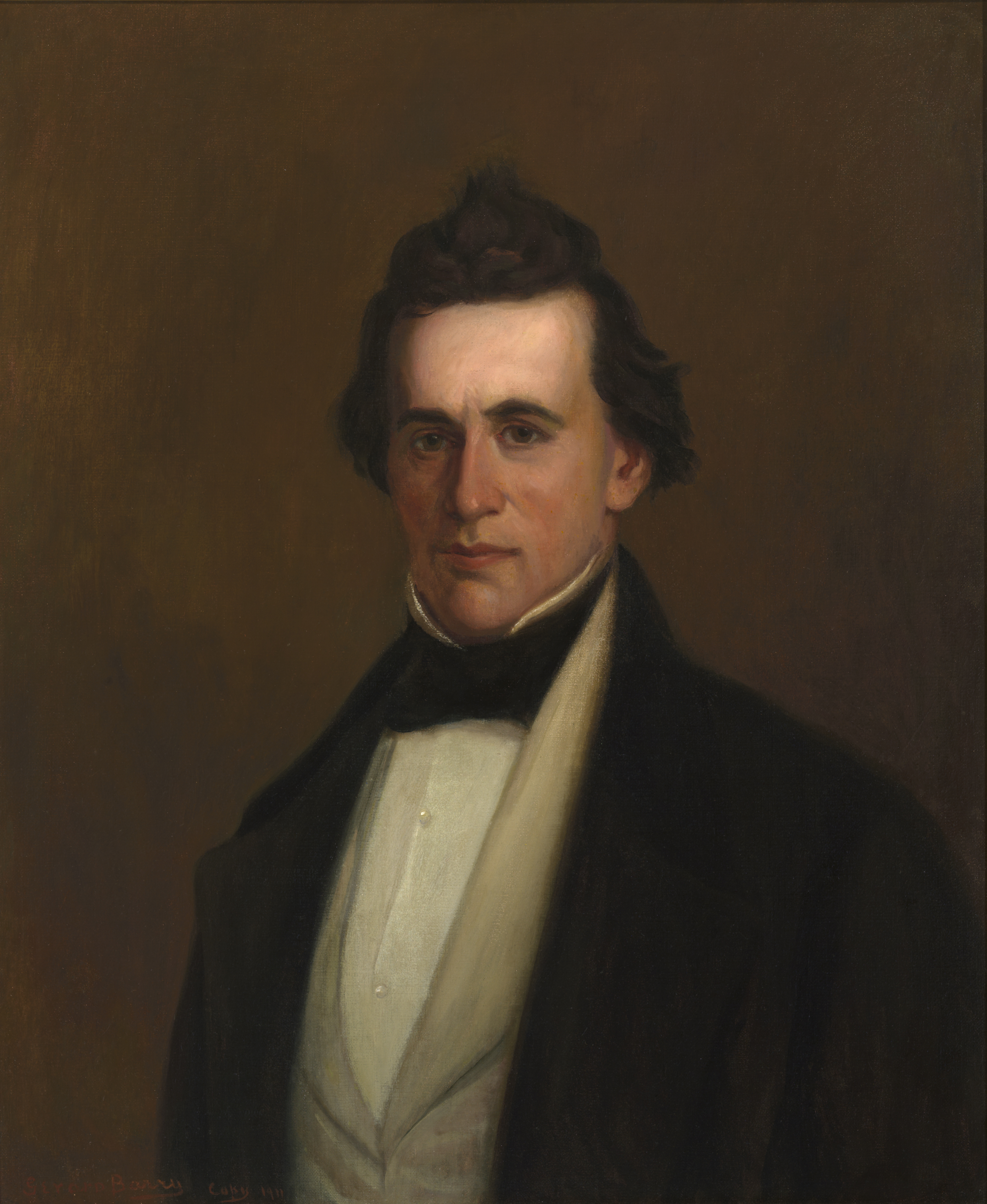
- 1911 portrait

15th Speaker of the United States House of Representatives
- In office May 31, 1841 – March 4, 1843
- Preceded by: Robert M. T. Hunter
- Succeeded by: John W. Jones

Member of the U.S. House of Representatives from Kentucky
- In office March 4, 1835 – March 3, 1845
- Preceded by: James Love (9th); Willis Green (6th)
- Succeeded by: Richard French (9th); John Preston Martin (6th)
- Constituency: 9th district (1835–1843); 6th district (1843–1845)

Member of the Kentucky House of Representatives
- In office 1832

Personal details
- Born: John D. White; February 14, 1802 Cumberland Gap (now Middlesboro, Kentucky), U.S.
- Died: September 22, 1845 (aged 43) Richmond, Kentucky, U.S.
- Cause of death: Suicide by Gunshot
- Resting place: Frankfort Cemetery
- Party: Whig
- Relations: White family
- Education: Greeneville College (JD)
- Profession: Politician; lawyer

John D. White (February 14, 1802 – September 22, 1845) was an American lawyer and politician who was the 15th speaker of the United States House of Representatives from 1841 to 1843. A member of the Whig Party, he represented Kentucky in the United States House of Representatives from 1835 to 1845. He was also a member of the Kentucky House of Representatives in 1832.

Born near Middlesboro, Kentucky, a small rural mountain town located in the Eastern Kentucky Coalfield, John was a member of the prestigious White family of politicians of Kentucky and Tennessee. He received a common education and studied law at Greeneville College in Tusculum, Tennessee. After graduating, White was an apprentice under William Owsley, another successful politician and lawyer. White was then admitted to the bar and quickly built a reputation as an adept lawyer.

Within several years, White was leading the Kentucky bar. Using his powerful and convincing speaking skills, he progressed to become one of the local leaders of the Whig Party and won election to the Kentucky House of Representatives. In 1835, he won election to the U.S. House of Representatives, representing Kentucky's 9th congressional district, and was continuously re-elected until his retirement in 1845. With the help of Henry Clay, he was chosen as speaker of the house, one of the highest political positions in the United States. He served as speaker for one term, but due to ineffective governing by his colleagues, he lost re-election as speaker. He served another term as a member of the House before he was appointed judge of the 19th judicial district in Kentucky. During the last few months of his life, he suffered from ill mental health, which eventually led to his death by suicide in September 1845.

== Early life, family, and education ==
John D. White was born on February 14, 1802, near Cumberland Gap (now Middlesboro, Kentucky), to Hugh and Catherine White. His father was the owner of Goose Creek Salt Works, which made the White family particularly wealthy and influential in Kentucky. He was kin to many influential politicians, including Addison White, John Daugherty White, and Hugh Lawson White, all of whom served in the U.S. Congress. He was educated in the common schools and studied law at Greeneville College (now known as Tusculum University) in Tusculum, Tennessee. He was also a student, friend, and fervent admirer of Henry Clay.

== Career ==
White studied law under William Owsley, who served as governor of Kentucky from 1844 to 1848. White was admitted to the bar in 1823 and quickly earned notoriety as a skilled lawyer, earning a substantial number of clients. Within several years, White had climbed to head of the bar in Kentucky.

=== Early political career (1832–1841) ===
White was known as a powerful orator and a convincing speaker. He soon rose to become one of the local leaders of the Whig Party and was elected to the Kentucky House of Representatives in 1832. In 1835, he was elected a member of the United States House of Representatives, representing Kentucky's 9th congressional district. During his time as a U.S. representative, White played an important role in discussions, particularly those regarding tariffs.

White served during the last several years of the Andrew Jackson administration. He opposed Jackson's fight against the Second Bank, believing it was mainly for personal reasons. He continued to serve during the Martin Van Buren administration and opposed the sub-treasury act, as well as the plan to annex Texas.

=== Speaker of the House (1841–1843) ===
In 1841, Whigs won a majority in the House and White was nominated for speaker. Henry Clay (a friend and supporter of White) helped in uniting House Whigs behind White, as well as building on supporters in both Kentucky and New England. Clay nominated Francis Ormand Jonathan Smith for clerk, believing that a pairing of White and Smith would secure the inter-regional alliance Clay was working to build. Many house Whigs saw Clay's scheme as alienating, which led to the conference being disbanded "in high dudgeon". White's challenger for the speakership was Democrat John Winston Jones. Many southern Whigs were dissatisfied with White, believing he was too moderate on the issue of slavery, and many threatened to nominate their own candidate for speaker, although they later just ended up casting their vote for White. When the house assembled, White captured a victory over Jones, receiving 121 votes out of 221 votes cast. He presided over the 27th United States Congress from May 31, 1841, to March 4, 1843.

After his election as speaker, White began re-constructing the standing house committees, giving Democrats the chairs of just five committees, and giving the rest to the Whigs. The Whig-controlled Congress took swift action in repealing the Independent Treasury Act and implemented a new Bankruptcy Act. Most of the legislation passed by the Whigs was vetoed by President John Tyler.

In the 1842–43 elections, the Whigs had lost almost half of the seats they gained during the 1840–41 elections, one of the largest losses a controlling party had suffered in American history. Historians attribute this loss to ineffective governing, difficulties with president Tyler, and reapportionment. With Tyler as president, the Whigs' economic plan was thwarted. As a result, the Whigs fished for policy alternatives, which, according to professors Jeffery A. Jenkins and Charles Stewart III, made the Whigs look incompetent. White was the Whigs' choice for speaker. The Democrats again nominated John Winston Jones to challenge White, and with the result of the recent elections, the Democrats gained a majority in the house. Jones defeated White by a margin of 128–59.

In his diary, former president John Quincy Adams wrote that "White is man of fine talents and an able debater, but his manner is so vehement and his articulation so rapid that it becomes altogether indistinct. He repeats the word 'sir' every fifth word, and his discourse is one continued stream, without division into paragraphs or construction of sentences."

=== Post–speakership (1843–1845) ===
On April 23, 1844, the House held a debate discussing the accusations of corruption that had been made against Henry Clay, the Whig Party's nominee for president that year. White, a staunch supporter of Clay, delivered a speech defending Clay. George O. Rathbun, a Democratic congressman from New York and opponent of Clay, began an argument with White. The argument soon escalated to a fistfight between the two congressmen, as other members of the house rushed to try and break up the fight. During the fight, an unknown person fired a pistol into the crowd, wounding a police officer. The House subsequently attempted to cover up the behavior. Both White and Rathbun apologized for their actions.

On February 8, 1845, White was appointed judge of the nineteenth judicial district of Kentucky. His nomination was approved by the Kentucky Senate by a margin of 22–11, and in a second vote his nomination was approved by a margin of 26–9. He decided not to run for re-election as a U.S. representative, instead deciding to take on full duties as a judge. He held the role of judge until his death by suicide on September 22, 1845.

== Later life and death ==
Before he took up the role of judge, White plagiarized a speech from former vice president Aaron Burr. When it was discovered, the press began ridiculing White. His embarrassment, combined with a bout of ill health and depression, led to White shooting himself in the head with a pistol. White is buried in the Frankfort Cemetery in Frankfort, Kentucky. Whitesburg, Kentucky is named in his honor.

Political offices
Preceded by Robert M.T. Hunter	Speaker of the U.S. House of Representatives; May 31, 1841 – March 4, 1843	Succeeded by John W. Jones
U.S. House of Representatives
Preceded by James Love	Member of the U.S. House of Representatives from Kentucky's 9th congressional district 1835–1843	Succeeded by Richard French
Preceded by Willis Green	Member of the U.S. House of Representatives from Kentucky's 6th congressional district 1843–1845	Succeeded by John Preston Martin
