= 1858 United States House of Representatives election in Florida =

- October 4, 1858
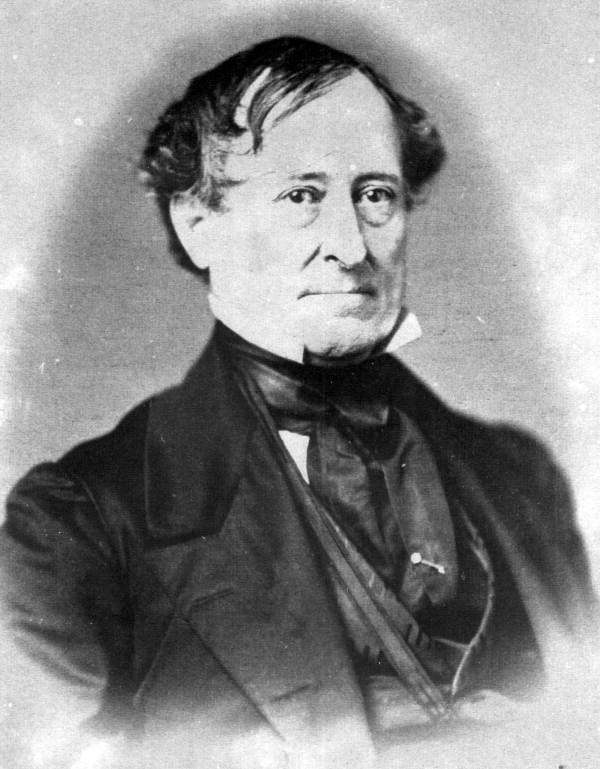

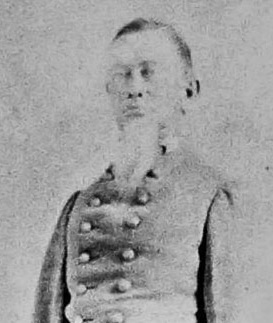
Nominee	George Sydney Hawkins	John Westcott
Party	Democratic	Independent Democratic
Popular vote	6,084	3,661
Percentage	62.43%	37.57%
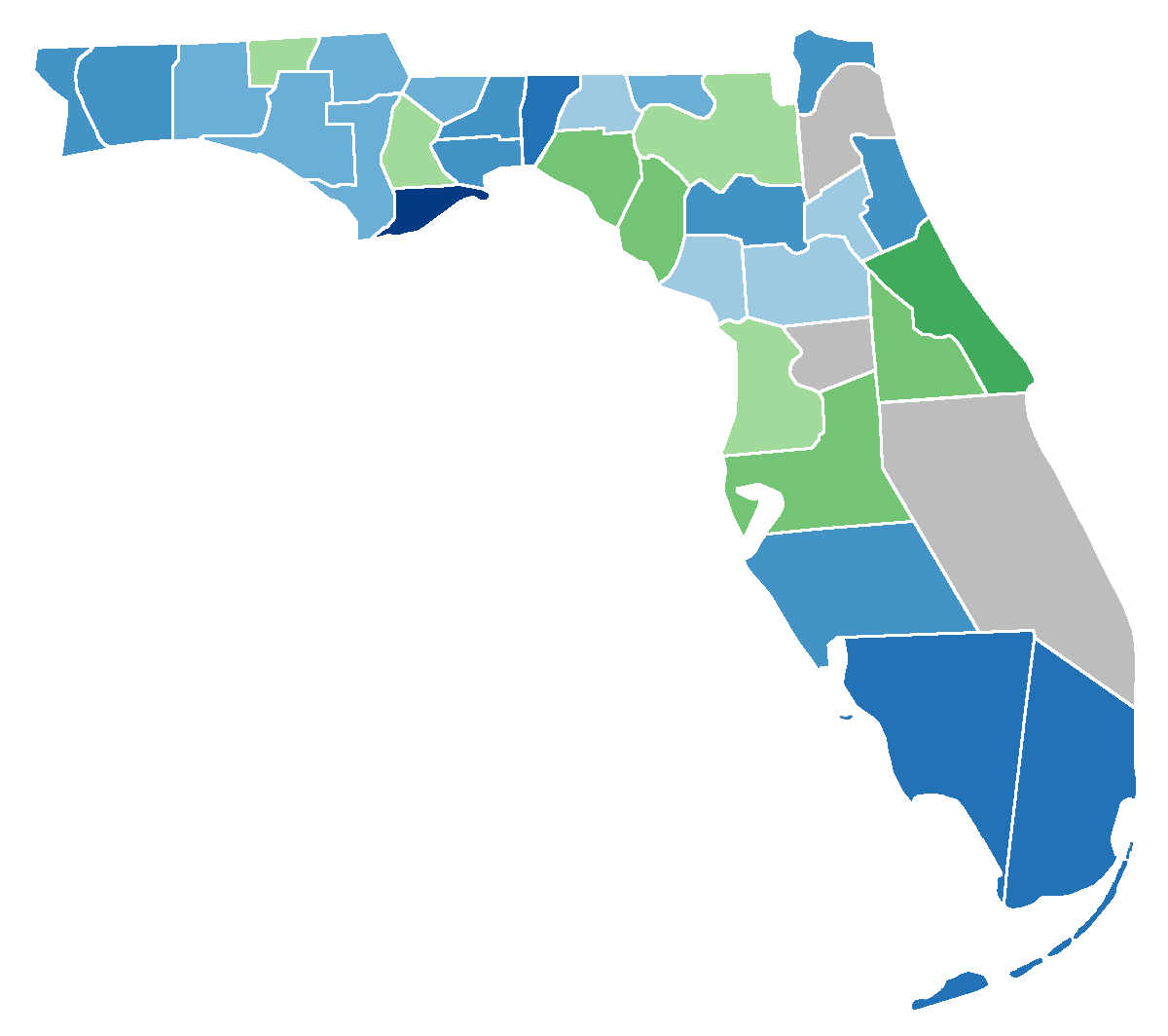
County Results
Hawkins
50–59%
60–69%
70–79%
80–89%
90–100%
Westcott
50–59%
60–69%
70–79%
No Votes
No Votes
Representative before election
George Sydney Hawkins
Democratic
Elected Representative
George Sydney Hawkins
Democratic

The 1858 United States House of Representatives election in Florida was held on Monday, October 4, 1858 to elect the single United States Representative from the state of Florida, one from the state's single at-large congressional district, to represent Florida in the 36th Congress. The election coincided with the elections of other offices, including various state and local elections.

The winning candidate would serve a two-year term in the United States House of Representatives from March 4, 1859, to March 4, 1861.

== Candidates ==
=== Democratic ===
==== Nominee ====
- George Sydney Hawkins, incumbent U.S. representative

=== Independent Democratic ===
==== Declared ====
- John Westcott, former Surveyor General of Florida

== Campaign ==
This election was held in the middle of the presidency of James Buchanan, with tensions between free states of the North and slave states of the South growing to the point of irreparability. Both the Whig Party and the Know Nothing Party had already collapsed, leaving no true opposition to the Democratic Party in Florida. Hawkins was very popular in the former Whig stronghold of Pensacola, bringing the populous city firmly into the Democratic column. Though Hawkins was expected to run unopposed, he was challenged by Westcott, the former surveyor general of Florida and brother of former U.S. senator James Westcott. Westcott, running as an Independent Democrat, was opposed to the corruption in the Florida Democratic Party, perceiving the party's selection of nominees at conventions making the state's politicians open to political patronage. Westcott also promised cheap land to frontier settlers.

Westcott performed best in the frontierlands of East Florida and South Florida, where he was very popular due to his role in the Seminole Wars. Despite this, he could not make inroads into West Florida and was crushed in the general election, only receiving 38% of the vote to Hawkins' 62%.

== General election ==
=== Results ===
Florida's at-large congressional district election, 1858
Party	Candidate	Votes	%	±%
Democratic	George Sydney Hawkins (inc.)	6,084	62.43%	+9.03%
Independent Democratic	John Westcott	3,661	37.57%	N/A
Majority		2,423	24.86%	+18.70%
Turnout		9,745	100.00%	
Democratic hold				

=== Results by County ===
County	George Sydney Hawkins Democratic		John Westcott Independent Democratic		Total votes
County	#	%	#	%	Total votes
Alachua	349	71.22%	141	28.78%	490
Brevard	0	0%	0	0%	0
Calhoun	85	61.59%	53	38.41%	138
Columbia	389	42.37%	529	57.63%	918
Dade	12	100%	0	0%	12
Duval	0	0%	0	0%	0
Escambia	304	79.58%	78	20.42%	382
Franklin	220	95.24%	11	4.76%	231
Gadsden	411	62.75%	244	37.25%	655
Hamilton	283	66.28%	144	33.72%	427
Hernando	99	40.08%	148	59.92%	247
Hillsborough	74	32.60%	153	67.40%	227
Holmes	75	45.18%	91	54.82%	166
Jackson	482	62.19%	293	37.81%	775
Jefferson	432	84.38%	80	15.63%	512
Lafayette	70	33.49%	139	66.51%	209
Leon	382	75.64%	123	24.36%	505
Levy	100	54.95%	82	45.05%	182
Liberty	43	46.74%	49	53.26%	92
Madison	317	53.28%	278	46.72%	595
Manatee	45	75.00%	15	25.00%	60
Marion	254	56.82%	193	43.18%	447
Monroe	158	87.78%	22	12.22%	180
Nassau	237	78.48%	65	21.52%	302
Orange	37	36.27%	65	63.73%	102
Putnam	127	58.80%	89	41.20%	216
Santa Rosa	331	77.52%	96	22.48%	427
St. Johns	180	72.58%	68	27.42%	248
Sumter	0	0%	0	0%	0
Taylor	75	33.78%	147	66.22%	222
Volusia	30	29.70%	71	70.30%	101
Wakulla	105	71.43%	42	28.57%	147
Walton	200	61.16%	127	38.84%	327
Washington	178	87.68%	25	12.32%	203
Totals	6,084	62.43%	3,661	37.57%	9,745

== Aftermath ==
This was the last election before the American Civil War to send a U.S. representative to Congress. An election was held in 1860, but the winner of that race did not serve in Congress as Florida seceded from the Union prior to the start of the 37th Congress. Hawkins withdrew from Congress on January 21, 1861 after Florida had joined the Confederate States of America. This was the last successful congressional election in Florida until 1868.

== See also ==
- United States House of Representatives elections, 1858
