= Ballast Point Park =

Park in Tampa, United States of America

- Jules Verne Park
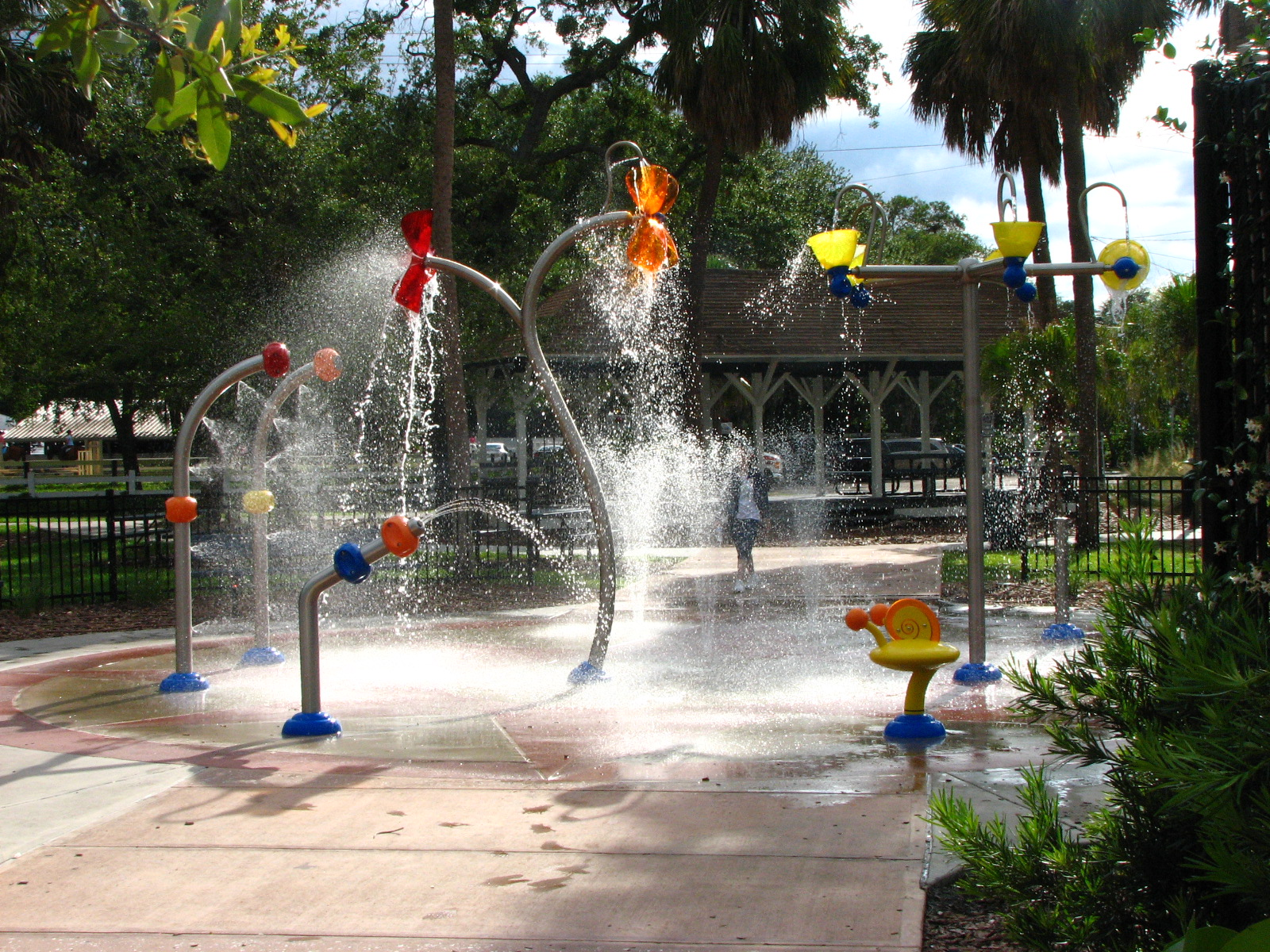
- Interactive Water Park at Ballast Point Park

- Location within Florida
- Location: Tampa, Florida
- Coordinates: 27.889°N 82.481°W
- Operator: City of Tampa

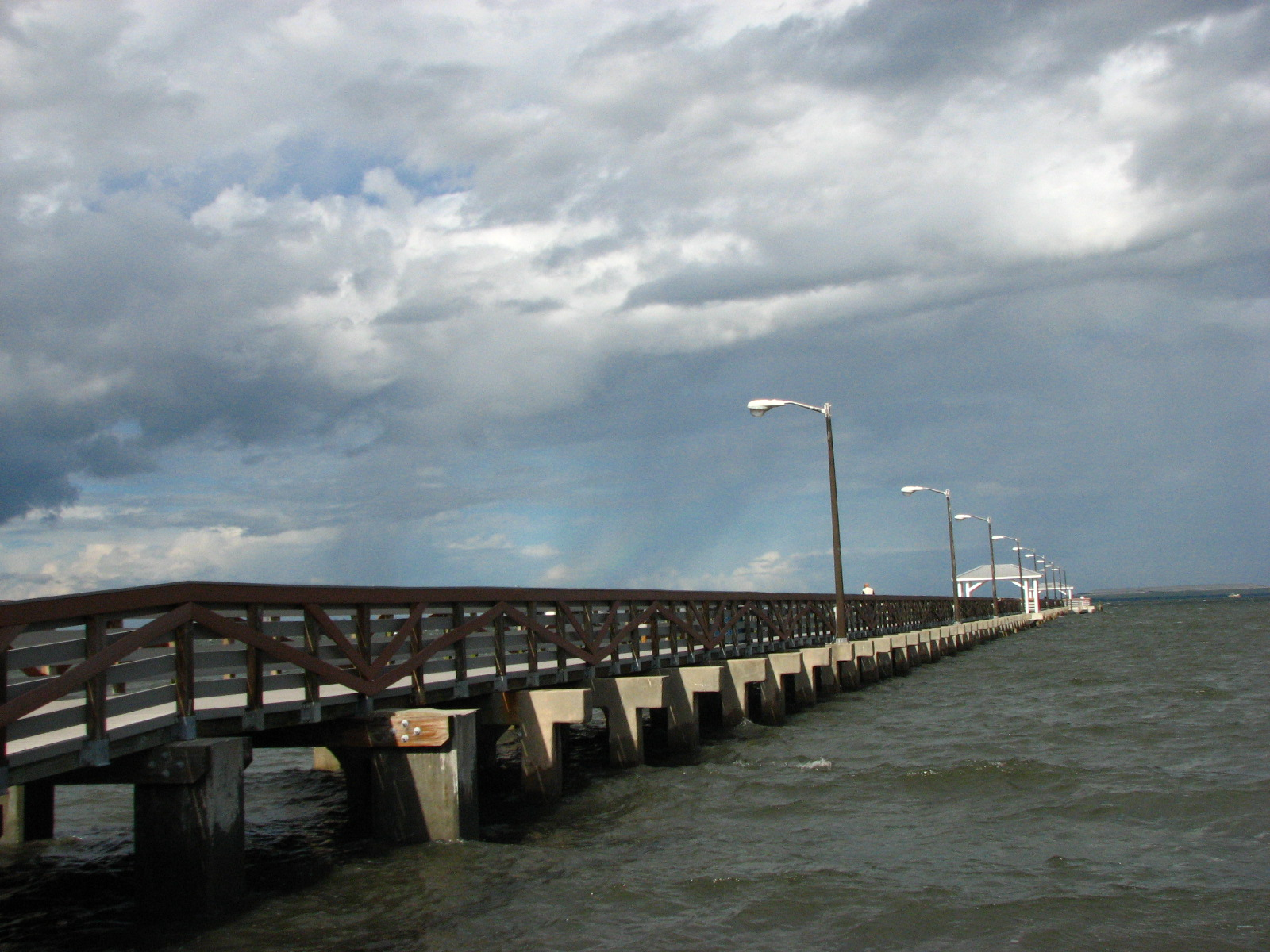
Fishing Pier at Ballast Point Park

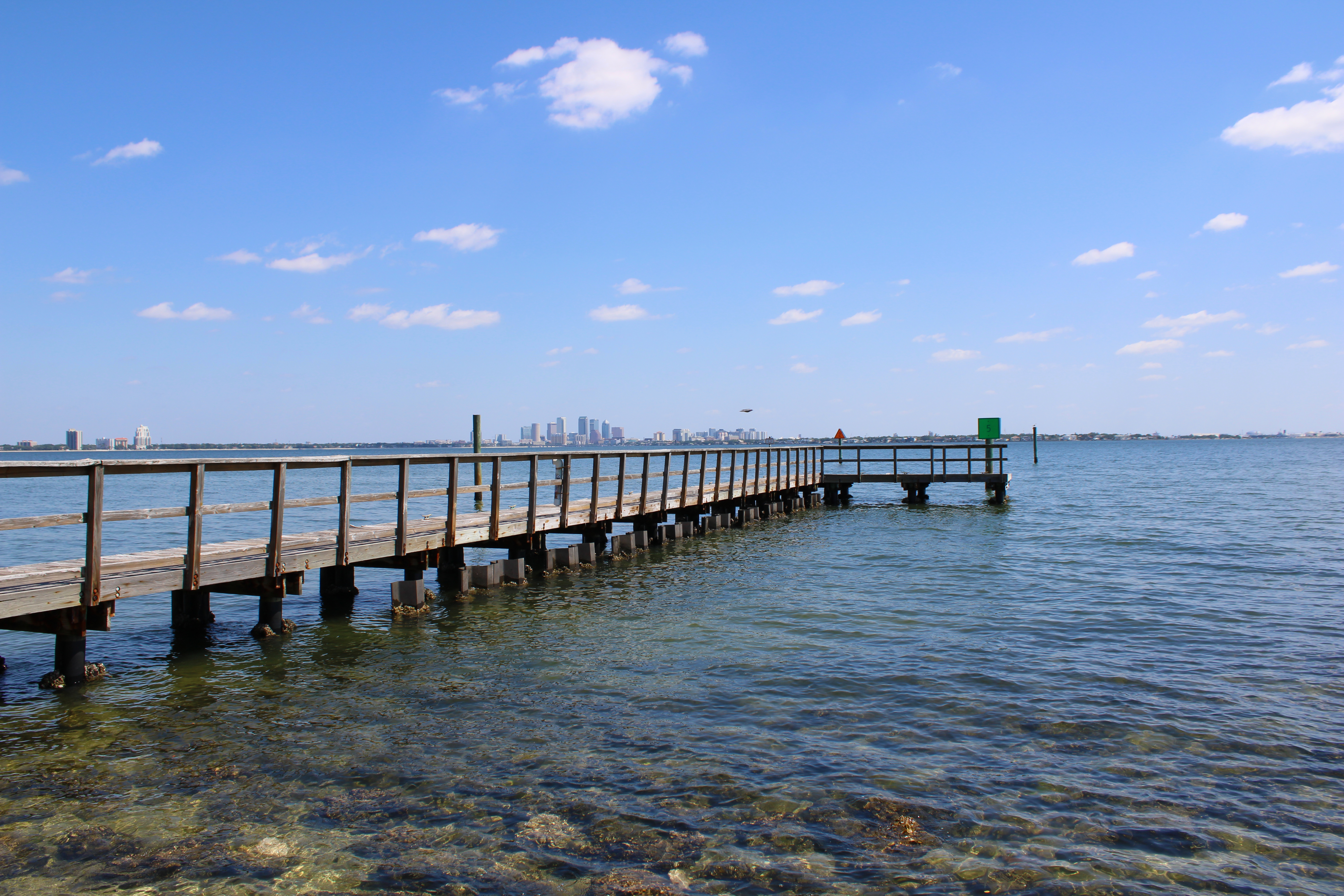
The smaller pier at Ballast Point Park, with the Tampa Skyline in the background.

Ballast Point Park is a park located within the Ballast Point neighborhood in Tampa, Florida. The park is adjacent to the Hillsborough Bay.

== History ==
Ballast Point Park was originally named Jules Verne Park but was renamed in 1903. Development of the park began in 1892 with the construction of the Ballast Point Pavilion by Chester and Emelia Chapin, who came to Tampa from New York. The park was a destination stop on the Consumers Electric Light and Street Railway Company, a predecessor of the later Tampa Electric Company (TECO) streetcar system.

The historical marker placed at the park by the Hillsborough County Historical Commission reads:

Mrs. Chester W. Chapin controlling owner of the company which operated the city's first electric trolley cars, purchased these acres and in 1894 developed this site into a tropical park as a terminal for her line. She named it for the French writer Jules Verne (1814-1905) who in his famous novel "From the Earth to the Moon" first published in 1865 chose Tampa town as his launching site for the imaginary shot of his rocket to that planet near one hundred years ago.”

== Features ==
The sections of the park that are open from sunrise to sunset include the playground, water play area and shelters for picnics and parties. The park also contains an interactive water play area for children. There is a 600 feet (180 m) fishing pier in the park that was open 24 hours until serious damage from Hurricane Helene closed it in September 2024; it has not been repaired or reopened. There is also a small seafood shack, Leons Lobstah Shack, serving classic East Coast seafood dishes and ice cream.
