= Florida Coast Line Canal and Transportation Company =

The Florida Coast Line Canal and Transportation Company (FCLCTC) was chartered in 1881 to construct a series of canals connecting existing lakes and rivers between St. Augustine and Lake Worth, Florida. The company begun through the urging of St. Augustine residents, led by Dr. John Westcott, a prominent local politician. In 1893, railroad mogul Henry Flagler became associated with the company in order to help extend his railroad to the south of the state.

Florida state law chapter 3641, approved February 6, 1885, gave the company the ability to extend its canal from Biscayne Bay to Key West, and gave it land grants for that part.

Florida state law chapter 4284, approved May 27, 1893, extended the time limit for the company to construct the canal from St. Augustine to Biscayne Bay from June 1, 1894, to June 1, 1897; any sections completed after that date would not receive land grants.

Florida state law chapter 4283, approved June 2, 1893, authorized the company to give the portion along the Indian River between Goat Creek and Jupiter Inlet to the United States government, which planned to improve it.
