= Ballast Point (Tampa) =

- Neighborhood
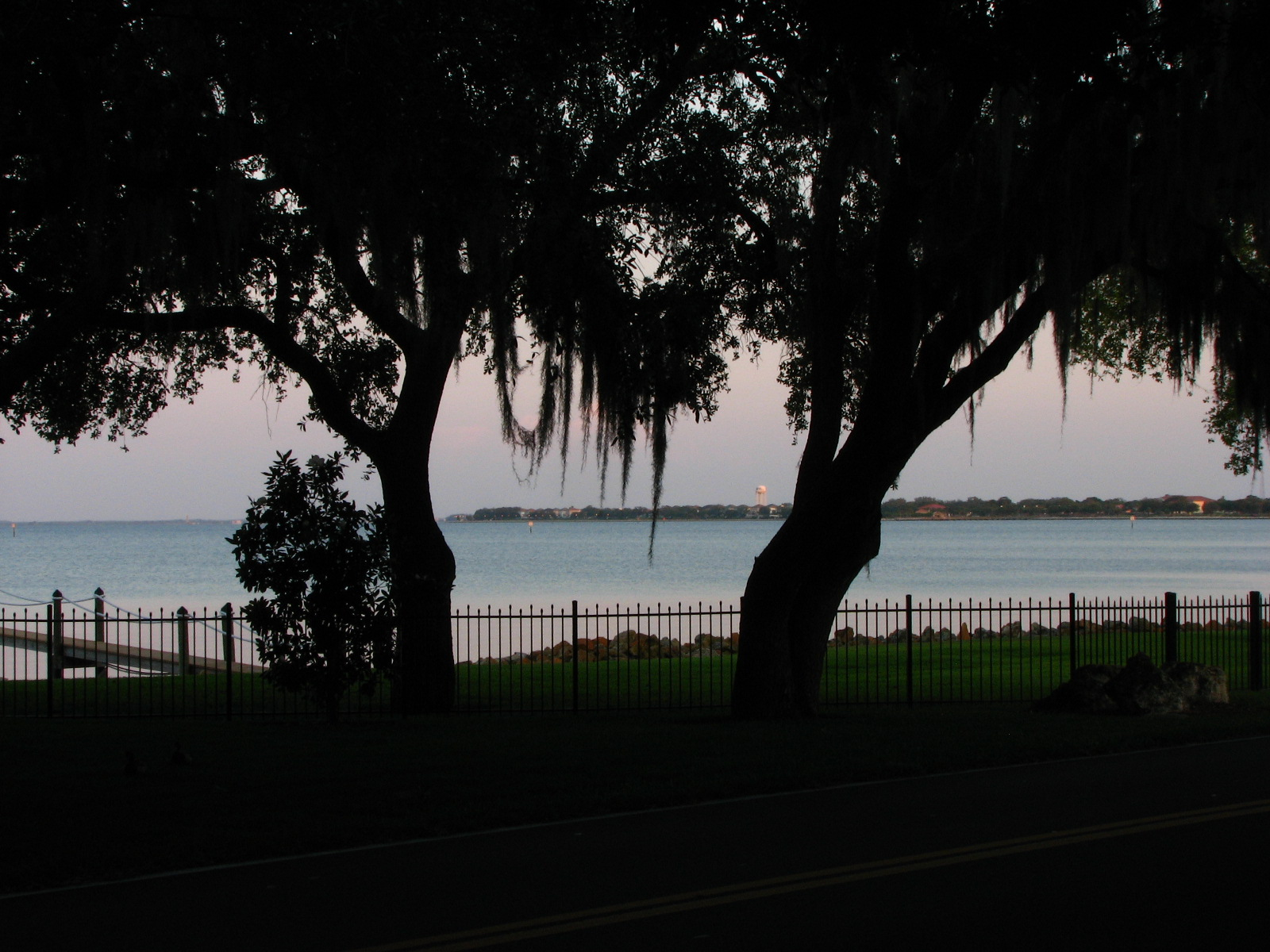
- Ballast Point Neighborhood Overlooking Hillsborough Bay

- Location within the state of Florida
- Coordinates: 27°53′21.27″N 82°28′50.66″W
- Country: United States
- State: Florida
- County: Hillsborough
- Incorporated (City): 1953

Government
  - Type: Mayor–council
  - Mayor: Jane Castor (D)
  - City attorney: Jim Shimberg
  - Legislative: City Council

Area
  - Total: 1.70000 sq mi (4.40298 km^{2})

Population (2010)
  - Total: 4,940
  - Density: 2,910/sq mi (1,120/km^{2})
- Time zone: UTC-5 (Eastern (EST))
  - Summer (DST): UTC-4 (EDT)
- ZIP Codes: 33611
- Area code: 813

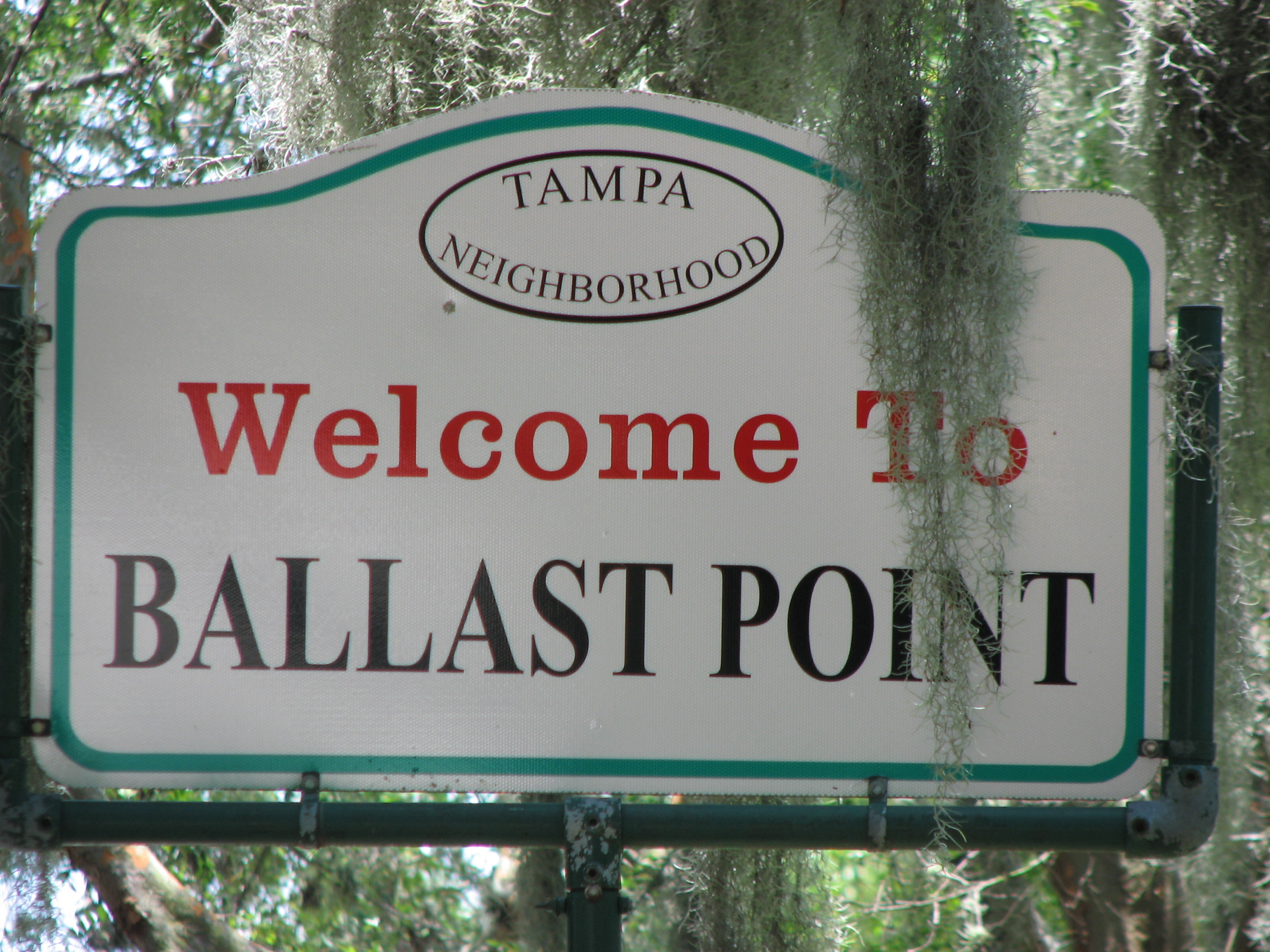
City of Tampa Neighborhood Welcome to Ballast Point Sign on Bayshore Blvd

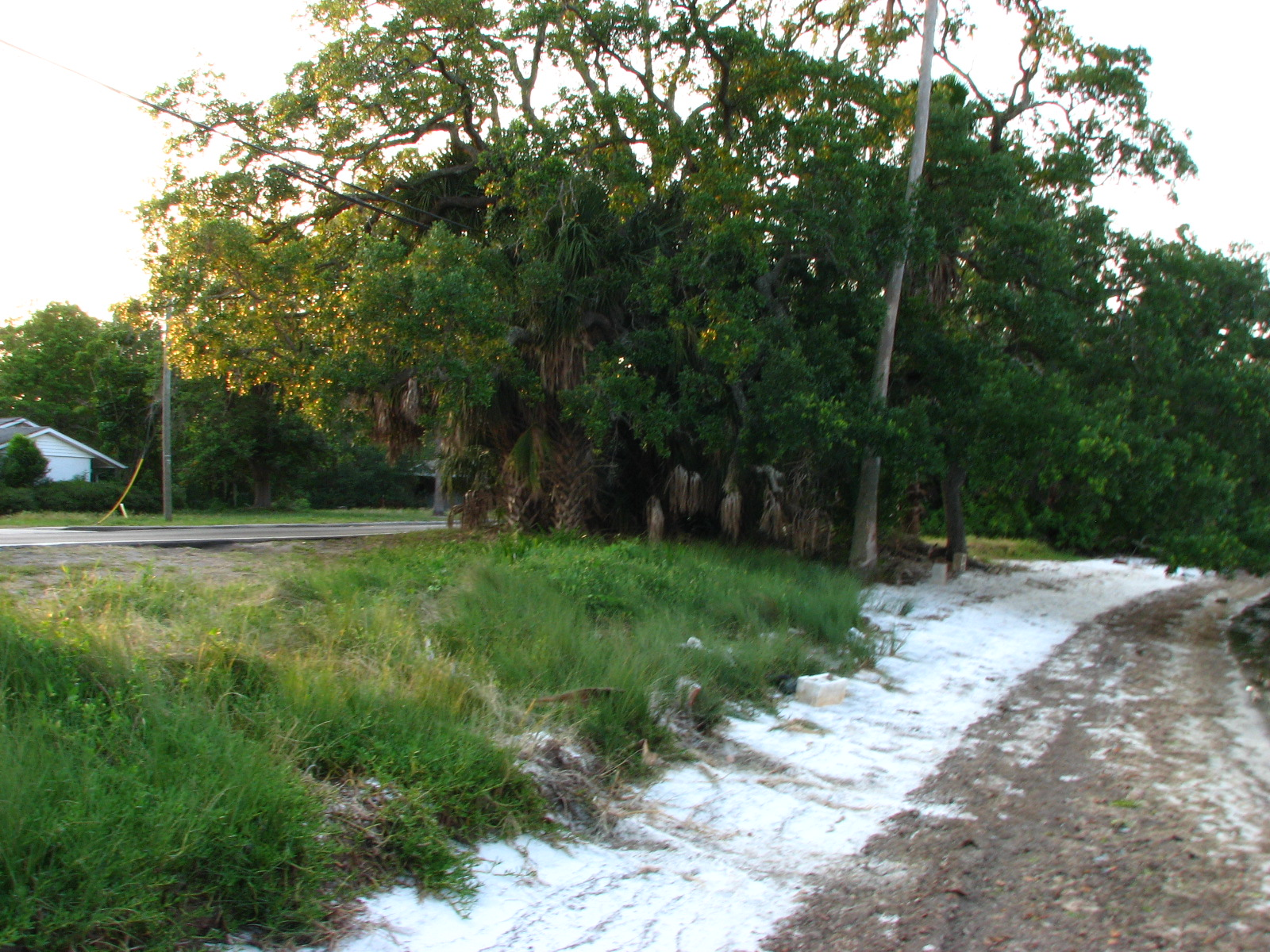
Shoreline on Hillsborough Bay at Ballast Point Neighborhood

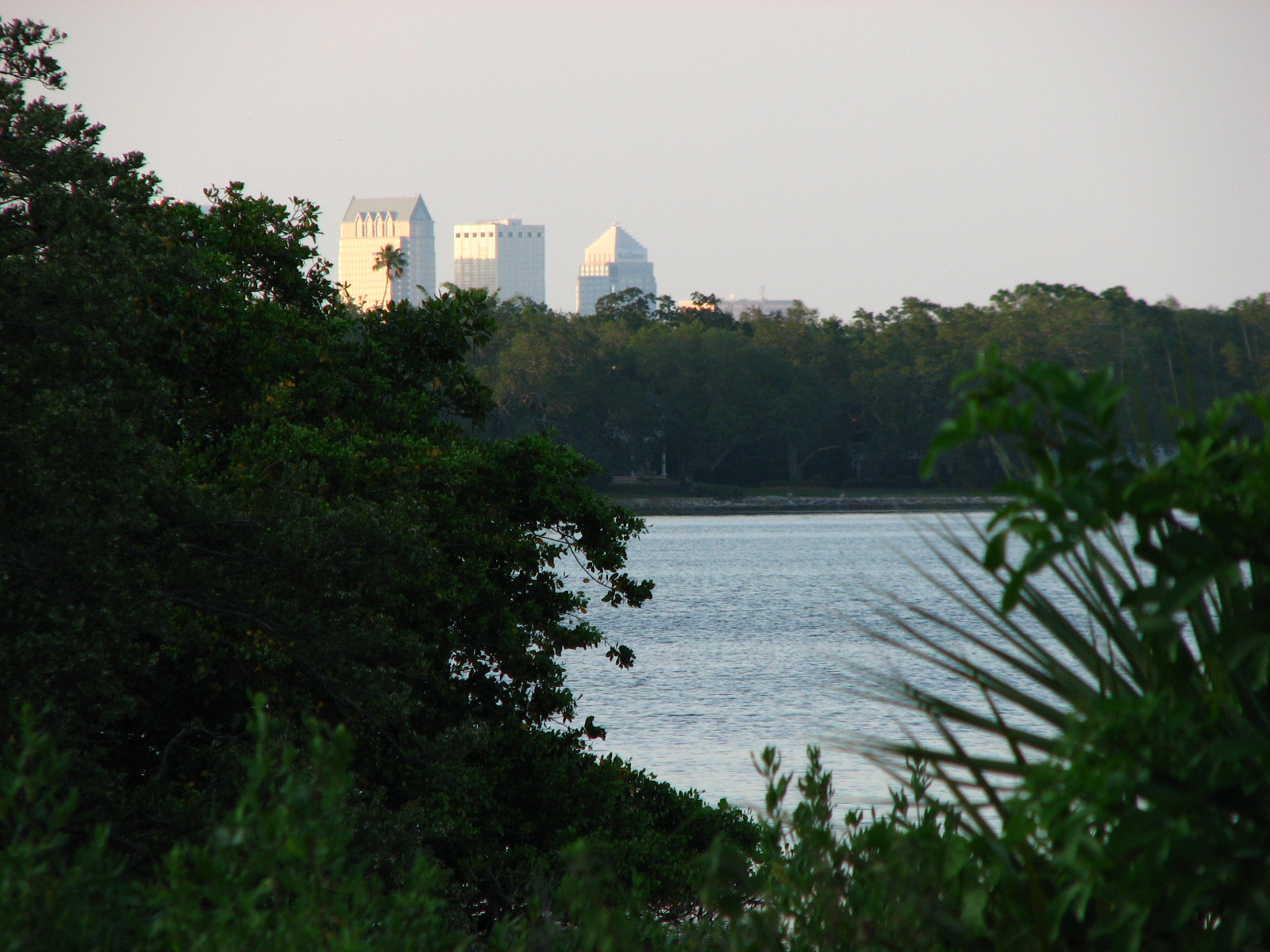
Neighborhood of Ballast Point Overlooking Hillsborough Bay

Ballast Point is a neighborhood located in the city of Tampa, county of Hillsborough, and the U.S. state of Florida. It is bordered by Hillsborough Bay, a section of the larger Tampa Bay. The ZIP Code serving the area is 33611. The boundaries are Gandy Blvd. to the north, MacDill Air Force Base to the south, Hillsborough Bay to the east and S. MacDill Ave. to the west. Also included are the homes and businesses on the west side of the street of S. MacDill Ave., Gadsden Park on S. MacDill Ave. and the adjacent ELAPP Property which is part of the South Tampa Greenway.

The Ballast Point neighborhood is an official City of Tampa neighborhood, and is largely residential. This neighborhood is canopied by mature oak trees full of Spanish moss, and is nestled on the Hillsborough Bay.

The neighborhood is home to the Ballast Point Neighborhood Association.

== History ==
The Battle of Ballast Point took place on October 18, 1863. It was during the American Civil War, just two days after the Battle of Fort Brooke began. A Union raiding party, under Acting Master T.R. Harris, disembarked at Ballast Point, landing at the current intersection of Gandy Boulevard and Bayshore Boulevard. Under the protracted diversionary bombardment of the city of Tampa and Fort Brooke by two ships, the USS Tahoma and the USS Adela, the Union divisions marched 14 miles to the Hillsborough River near the site of today's Lowry Park Zoo. They surprised, captured, and burned two notorious ships, the blockade runner Scottish Chief, a steamship, and the sloop Kate Dale a few miles up the river. The ships were owned by the future mayor of Tampa, James McKay. Escaping capture by mere minutes, with members of his crew in tow, James McKay sped to the city of Tampa and warned all of the landing party and the fate of his ships.

After the burning of the ships, the Confederate forces were alerted to the raiding party's location, and commenced pursuit. Harris's Union forces were surprised by a detachment of the garrison, the 2nd Florida Infantry Battalion. A brief but sharp exchange of fire resulted in casualties before the Union troops returned towards the sea.

The Oklawaha Rangers, a Confederate cavalry unit, caught up with the Union raiders and a full engagement ensued. The Union soldiers came under direct fire as they boarded their dinghies, in a tactical retreat. The Confederate defenders destroyed the steamer A.B. Noyes to preclude her capture.

== Geography and climate ==
According to the Hillsborough Community Atlas, that lists the City of Tampa as their source of information, the neighborhood has a total area of 1.7 mi^{2}.

== Demographics ==
According to the Hillsborough County Atlas, that lists the 2010 United States census as their source of information, the neighborhood had a total population of 4,940. However, these records include census tracks that include the entire MacDill Air Force Base, and tracks west of MacDill Ave. that extend to Dale Mabry Hwy. There is a discrepancy on the City of Tampa website that states that Ballast Point is larger than the current boundaries declared by the Ballast Point Neighborhood Association.
