= James Innes Thornton =

American politician from Alabama (1800–1877)

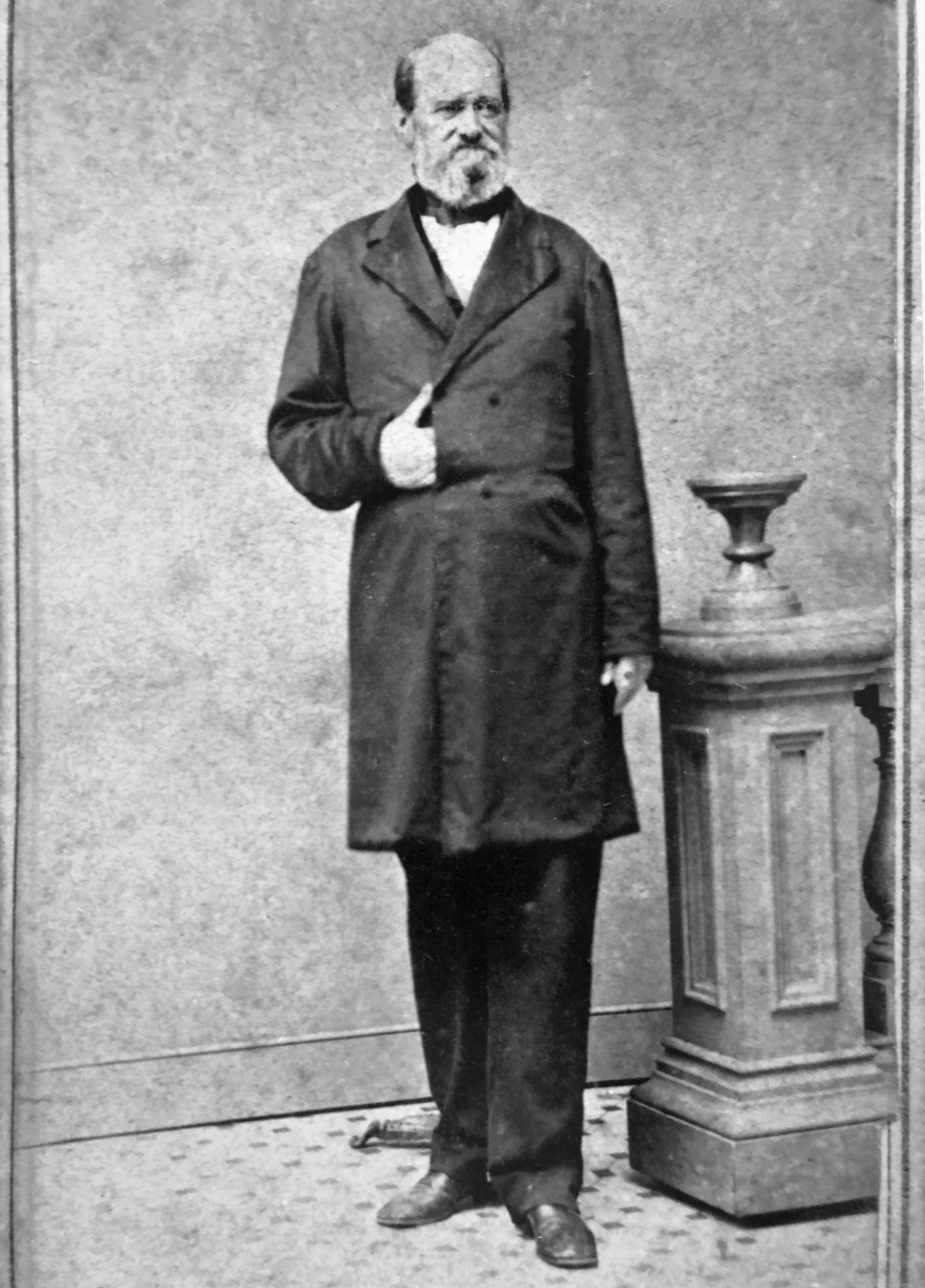

4th Secretary of State of Alabama
- In office 1824–1834
- Governor: Israel Pickens; John Murphy; Gabriel Moore; Samuel B. Moore; John Gayle
- Preceded by: James J. Pleasants
- Succeeded by: Edmund A. Webster

Personal details
- Born: October 28, 1800 Fall Hill Fredericksburg, Virginia
- Died: September 13, 1877 (aged 76) Thornhill Greene County, Alabama
- Spouse(s): Mary Ann Glover, Ann Amelia Smith, Sarah Williams Gould
- Children: George Francis Thornton, Mary Amelia Thornton, Jean Stirling Thornton, Delia Forbes Smith Thornton, James Innes Thornton, Fitzgerald Thornton, George Francis Thornton II, Katherine Marshall Thornton, Innes Thornton, Butler Brayne Thornton, Harry Innes Thornton

James Innes Thornton (October 28, 1800 – September 13, 1877) was an Alabama, USA, planter and politician.

== Early life ==
Thornton was born on October 28, 1800, at Fall Hill near Fredericksburg, Virginia, to Francis Thornton IV and Sallie Innes. His father was a successful physician, politician and planter who was second cousin to George Washington and held great prominence in the local community. His mother was the daughter of a wealthy Scottish merchant who had arrived in Virginia around the time of the American Revolution. Thornton was largely educated by private itinerant educators who would reside at the Thornton family estate. He graduated from Washington and Lee University in 1820 and moved to Huntsville, Alabama, to practice law with his brother Harry Innes Thornton.

== Political career ==
Thornton's strong familial ties encouraged an endeavor into politics fueled by a successful law practice and considerable wealth from the plantation he had developed upon arriving in the state. He was elected in 1824 as Secretary of State of Alabama and in the same year appointed by the Governor of Alabama as the official state escort to the Marquis de Lafayette on his 1825 return and tour of the United States. Thornton proved to be highly successful and respected in his political office and subsequently dissolved his law practice. He served for ten years as Secretary of State lasting through five Governors.

== Plantation ==
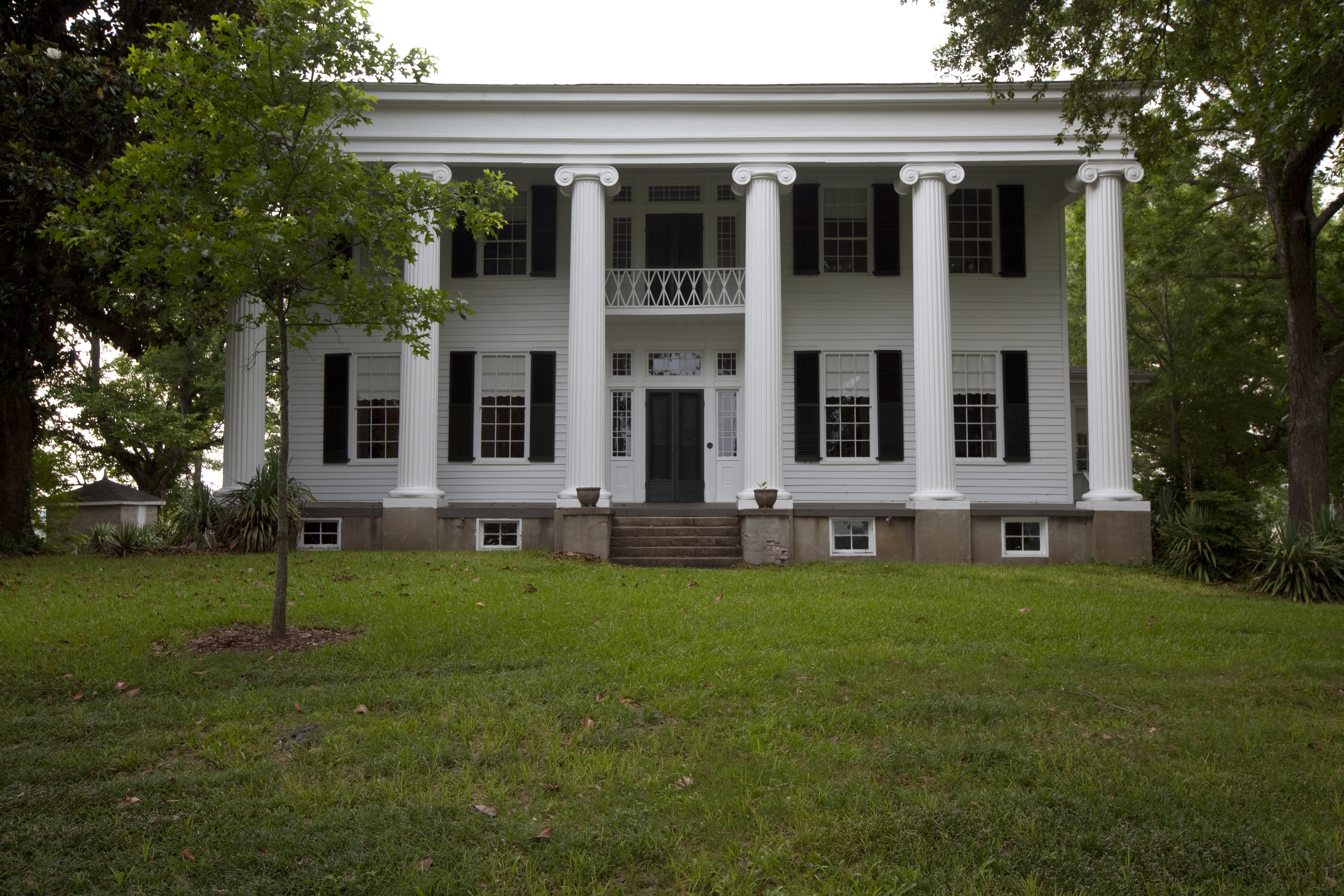
Thornhill main house

In 1824, Thornton began to actively develop a large plot of land he had acquired in Greene County, Alabama. A significant reason for his emigration to the Deep South, like many men from prominent Virginia families, was to expand his wealth far beyond what was feasible in Virginia. In 1825, he married his first wife, Mary Ann Glover, whose family had already begun to develop lucrative cotton plantations in the area. Thornton's business prowess resulted in his plantation which he named Thornhill becoming one of the most successful in the region. The house is traditionally believed to be a derivation of the name of William Thornton the first of Thornton's ancestors in America. The main house at Thornhill was completed in the Greek Revival style in 1833. The architect or housewright responsible for the design and construction of the house is not known though it is similar in style and construction to Rosemount, a neighboring plantation which belonged to his brother-in-law Williamson Allen Glover. There is strong evidence to indicate that both buildings were designed by the Alabama architect William Nichols, who served as State Architect during Thornton's tenure in government. In addition to the main house there is a small school house stylistically in keeping with the main house; the structural arrangement reflects that of Thornton's childhood home Fall Hill which has a small school house set several yards away from the carriage entrance of the house. Thornhill is considered one of the most significant antebellum plantation complexes in Alabama. The plantation buildings were recorded in the 1930s by the Historic American Buildings Survey. The main house has been recreated in miniature as an example of plantation architecture for the American Museum in Britain near Bath, UK.

== Family ==
Thornton was born to a prominent Virginia family with substantial land and slave holdings and diverse business interests in their native state including, blast furnaces, grist mills, lumber mills, ships and commercial enterprises. The first of his ancestors, William Thornton, had arrived in America sometime before 1649, and established large land holdings in Gloucester County, Virginia, but eventually passed the property on to his son William before his death and his lands in Richmond County to his son Rowland and moved to modern day Stafford County, Virginia, with his son Francis. This move established Thornton's family and their wealth around the Fredericksburg area. Over time, the family estates were divided among more and more branches which diminished the individual wealth of family members but maintained their overall economic and political strength. Their marriages and familial connections brought three Presidents into his family George Washington, James Madison and Zachary Taylor. Though many had improved their positions through advantageous marriage, it is likely that Thornton and his brother were more prudent in seeking to establish themselves in the booming cotton regions.

Thornton's first marriage was to Mary Ann Glover (1808 - 1830), a native of Alabama who was the daughter of Allen Glover and Sarah Norwood. The Glovers had been a moderately affluent South Carolina family who, by the time of Thornton's marriage, had acquired vast land and slave holdings. Glover died within five years of their marriage and Thornton returned to Fredericksburg in 1830 and married his former neighbor and kinsman Anne Amelia Smith, the daughter of George Alexander Smith and Delia Forbes. Smith was connected to the Innes family through their Scottish lines and both of her parents were from prominent Scottish families descended from the Erskines of Alva and Aloa. Smith's brother, Murray Forbes Smith, brought great economic backing to Thornton through his cotton brokerage set up in Mobile. Through Smith, Thornton was the uncle of Alva Vanderbilt Belmont. Thornton's last marriage was to Sarah Williams Gould, the daughter William Proctor Gould and Eliza Williams Chotard. She was the widow of Samuel Merritt Gowdey. Sarah Gould Thornton outlived her husband, dying in 1885.

Children by Mary Amelia Glover

- Mary Thornton

Children by Anne Amelia Smith

- George Francis Thornton,
- Jean Stirling Thornton
- Delia Forbes Smith Thornton
- James Innes Thornton Jr.
- Fitzgerald Thornton
- Katherine Marshall Thornton
- Innes Thornton
- Butler Brayne Thornton
- Harry Innes Thornton

Thornton and Sarah Williams Gould had no children.

== Ancestry ==
Ancestors of James Innes Thornton

16. Col. Francis Thornton
8. Col. Francis Thornton II
17. Mary Taliaferro
4. Francis Thornton III
18. Roger Gregory
9. Frances Gregory
19. Mildred Washington
2. Francis Thornton IV
20. Samuel Thompson
10. Rev. John Thompson
21. Mary MacDonald
5. Ann Thompson
22. Richard Edward Brayne
11. Anne Butler Brayne
23. Anne Butler
1. James Innes Thornton
24. William Innes
12. Robert Innes
25. Margaret MacKay
6. Hon. Harry Innes
26. William Bird Richards
13. Catherine Richards
27. Jane Todd
3. Sarah "Sallie" Innes
28. Joseph Calloway
14. Col. James Calloway
29. Elizabeth Tilley
7. Elizabeth Calloway
30. Henry Tate
15. Sarah P. Tate
31. Sarah
