= The Village Beat =

Newspaper in Palm Beach County, Florida

The Village Beat is the second African-American newspaper in Palm Beach County, Florida, but the first African-American newspaper to cover news county-wide.

== History ==
The Village Beat, headquartered in Delray Beach, FL, in Palm Beach County, was established in the 1990s originally as a monthly newspaper. Theis a non-profit publication where articles are written by volunteers from the local community. The editorial content covers a range of subjects that include local black history, medical issues affecting the black community, financial health, education and always highlighting the local achievements of African Americans in Palm Beach County, Florida. The Village Beat has also had the mission of enhancing the minds of the African-American community by also including editorial topics that were not necessarily "Black" in subject but it is information pertinent for which the African-American community needs to become aware particularly in the areas of financial health, and arts and culture.

When the publication was initiated, the design and printing was done by the former Boca Raton News.

Presently, The Village Beat will be re-launching as a magazine.

Pre-dating The Village Beat is the Florida Photo News, which was founded by M. A. Hall Williams in 1955 in West Palm Beach, Florida. The focus of this newspaper was just the black community that was living and working in the City of West Palm Beach, unlike The Village Beat, which covers the entire County and includes national and international news pertinent to African Americans in Palm Beach County, Florida

Charlotte Gilmore Durante is the founder of The Village Beat. In 1978, she became the first African-American woman commissioner for the City of Delray Beach, Florida.
