= Thornhill (Forkland, Alabama) =

Historic house in Alabama, United States

- U.S. National Register of Historic Places
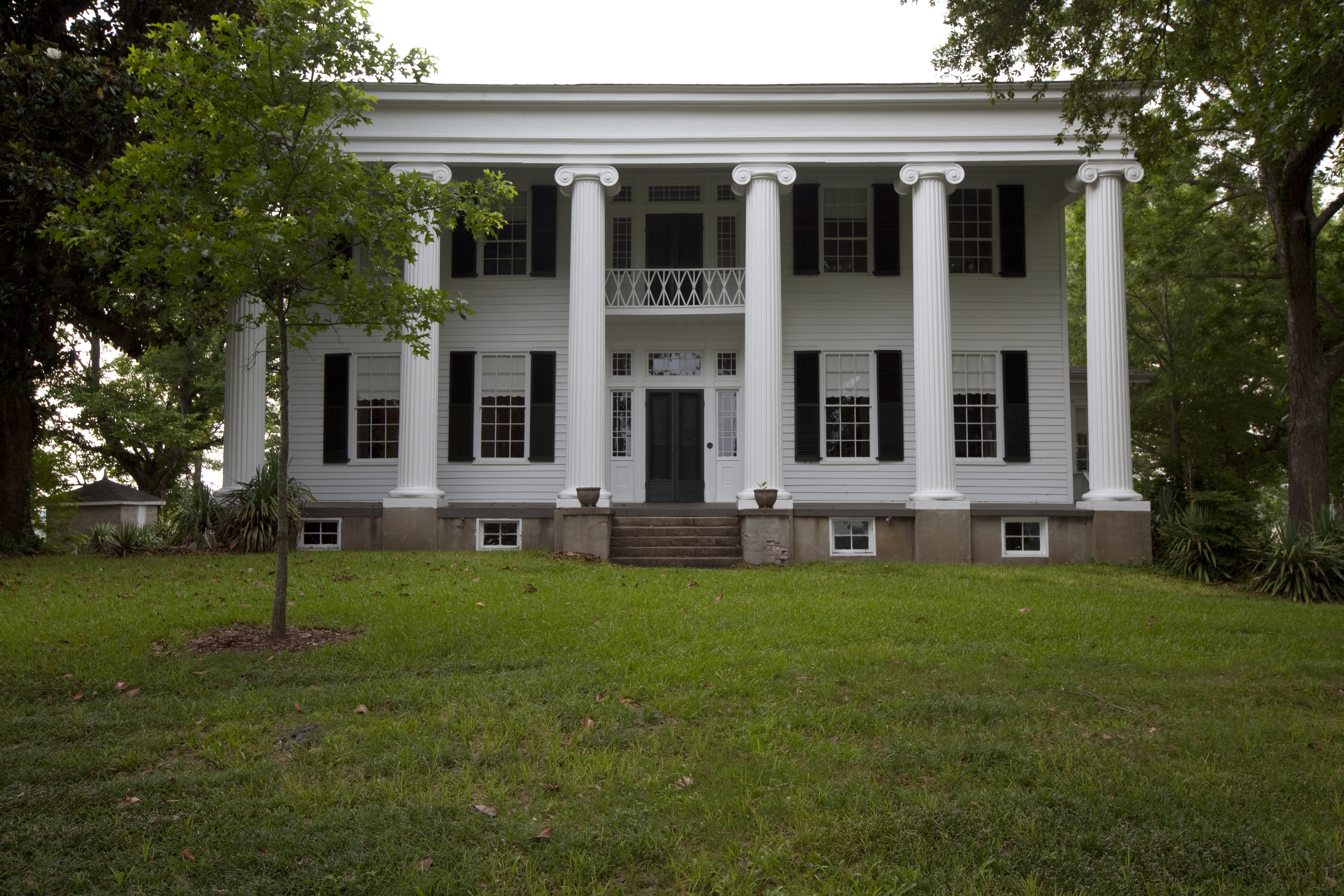
- The front elevation of the main house in 2010

- Location within Alabama Location within the United States
- Interactive map showing the location of Thornhill
- Nearest city: Forkland, Alabama
- Coordinates: 32°41′18″N 87°55′45″W
- Built: 1833
- Architect: William Nichols
- Architectural style: Greek Revival
- NRHP reference No.: 84000618
- Added to NRHP: May 10, 1984

Thornhill is a historic plantation near Forkland, Alabama, United States. The Greek Revival main house was built in 1833 by James Innes Thornton. The house was placed on the National Register of Historic Places on May 10, 1984.

== History ==
James Innes Thornton was born October 28, 1800, at the Thornton family plantation known as Fall Hill, in Fredericksburg, Virginia. He was educated at Washington and Lee University and then emigrated to Huntsville, Alabama. He began to practice law there in 1820. He was elected as Alabama's third secretary of state in 1824 and remained in that position until 1834. After this he retired from public life and became a planter in Greene County. Thornton married Mary Amelia Glover in 1825, daughter of Allen and Sarah Norwood Glover of Demopolis. They had two children. Her brother, Williamson Allen Glover, developed the neighboring plantation known as Rosemount. Mary died after only a few years. In 1831, Thornton remarried Anne Amelia Smith of Dumfries, Virginia. Anne died in 1864. He then remarried in 1870 for a third and final time to Mrs. Sarah Williams Gould Gowdy, daughter of William Proctor and Eliza Chotard Gould of the Hill of Howth in Boligee. Thornton died at Thornhill on September 13, 1877.

Regarding the Thornton connection to George Washington, Mildred Washington Gregory, George Washington's paternal aunt and godmother, had three daughters who married three Thornton brothers. Mildred Gregory's daughter Frances (circ. 1720–1790)(first cousin of George Washington) married Col. Francis Thornton III (circ. 1711–1748) of Fall Hill. They were the great-grandparents of James Innes Thornton.

Thornhill was developed by Thornton as a cotton plantation in the late 1820s-early 1830s and extended over 2,600 acres (11 km^{2}). It later grew to over 5,000 acres and is currently 2,000 acres.

According to the diary of Josiah Gorgas, in talking with Thornton at Thornhill on Tuesday, June 6, 1865, less than two months after the end of the Civil War, Thornton "oppos(ed) ... the doctrine of secession and necessary deduction that we fought so valiantly (in the War) and bled so freely in a cause radically wrong."

== Architecture ==
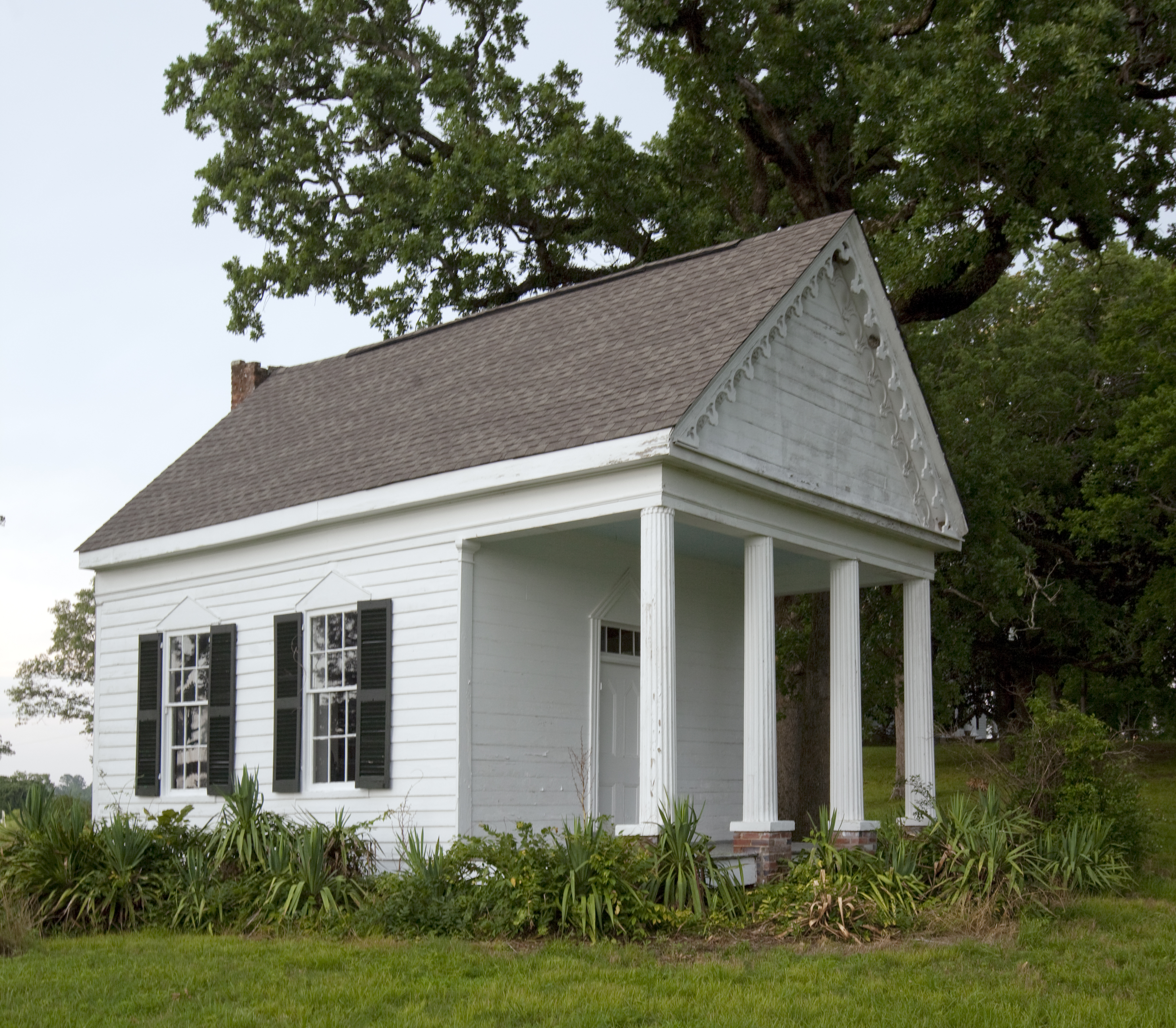
The plantation schoolhouse at Thornhill, built circa 1845.

William Nichols is believed to be the architect of the main house at Thornhill, hired in 1832 by Thornton. Nichols was made the state architect of Alabama in 1827. He is known for designing the original campus of the University of Alabama and now-destroyed Alabama State Capitol building at Tuscaloosa and the former Mississippi State Capitol building in Jackson, Mississippi. He is also believed to be the original architect of Rosemount, neighbor to Thornhill. Thornton served as Alabama's secretary of state from 1824 to 1834 and would have been very aware of Nichols and his work. The main house at Thornhill was completed by 1833. The monumental two-story portico with six Ionic columns was added circa 1850. David Rinehart Anthony, of Eutaw, is believed to be the builder who made the portico addition and second story balcony (crisscrossed lattice railing). The house measures 55 feet (17 m) wide. Inside is a 14 ft (4.3 m) wide by 40 ft (12 m) long central hall with a fine spiral staircase at the back. There are two rooms to either side. The left front room was the parlor, with the dining room behind it. On the front right was the master bedroom with the plantation office behind it. Upstairs is a matching hall and four bedrooms. All eight rooms are 19.5 feet (5.9 m) square. The downstairs rooms have 12-foot (3.7 m) ceilings. The upstairs ceilings are 11 feet (3.4 m).

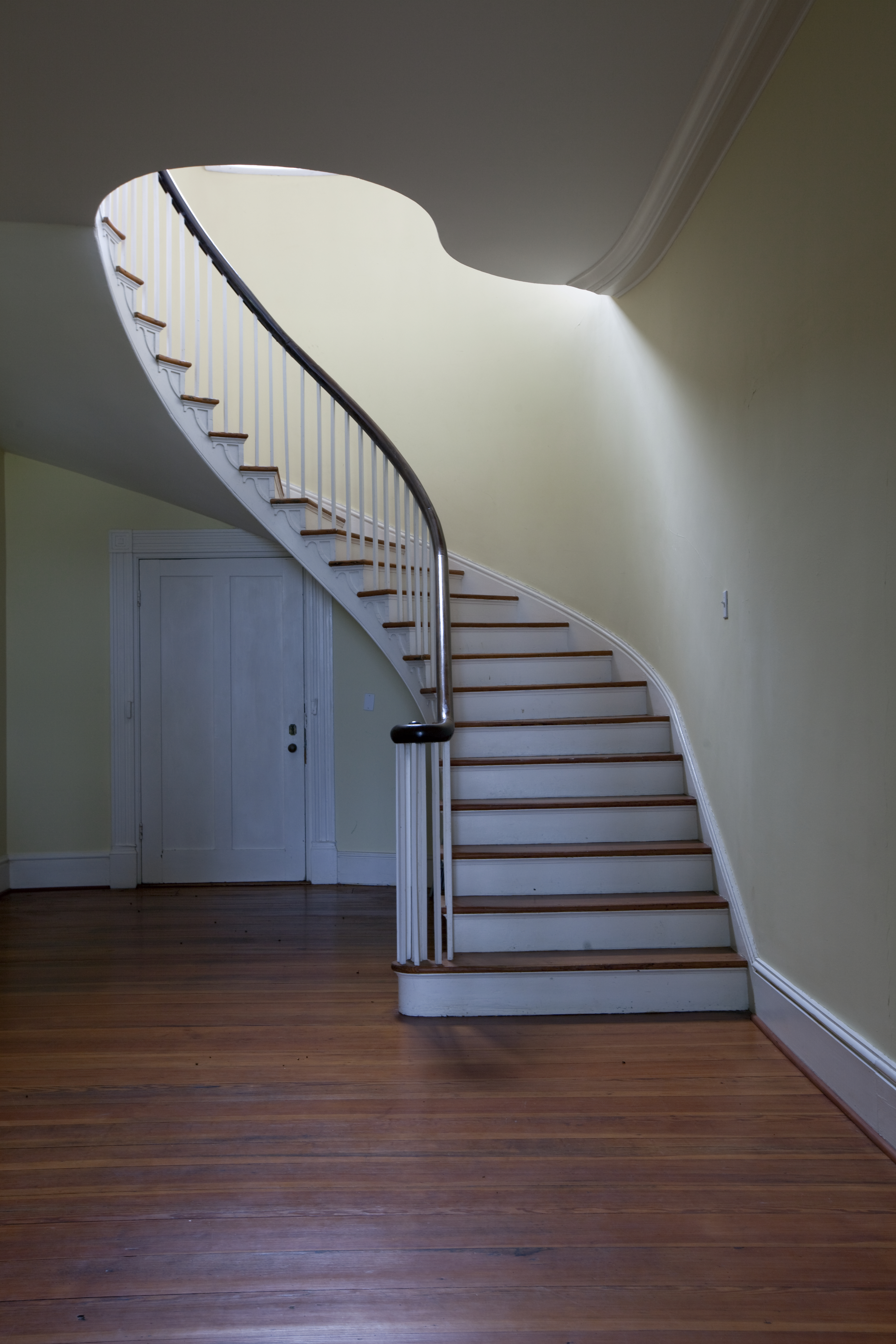
The main staircase at the rear of the downstairs central hall.

Originally there was a brick kitchen behind the house; it later burned. Additions were made to the original structure from circa 1900 to 1949. They were razed in 1994 and rebuilt to better match the original intent of the house. The house and grounds were extensively recorded by the Historic American Buildings Survey in 1934. The plantation schoolhouse was constructed circa 1845. The Thornton children, as well as neighboring plantation children, were taught there. Surrounding the schoolhouse are 250-year-old post oaks.

== Family Cemetery ==
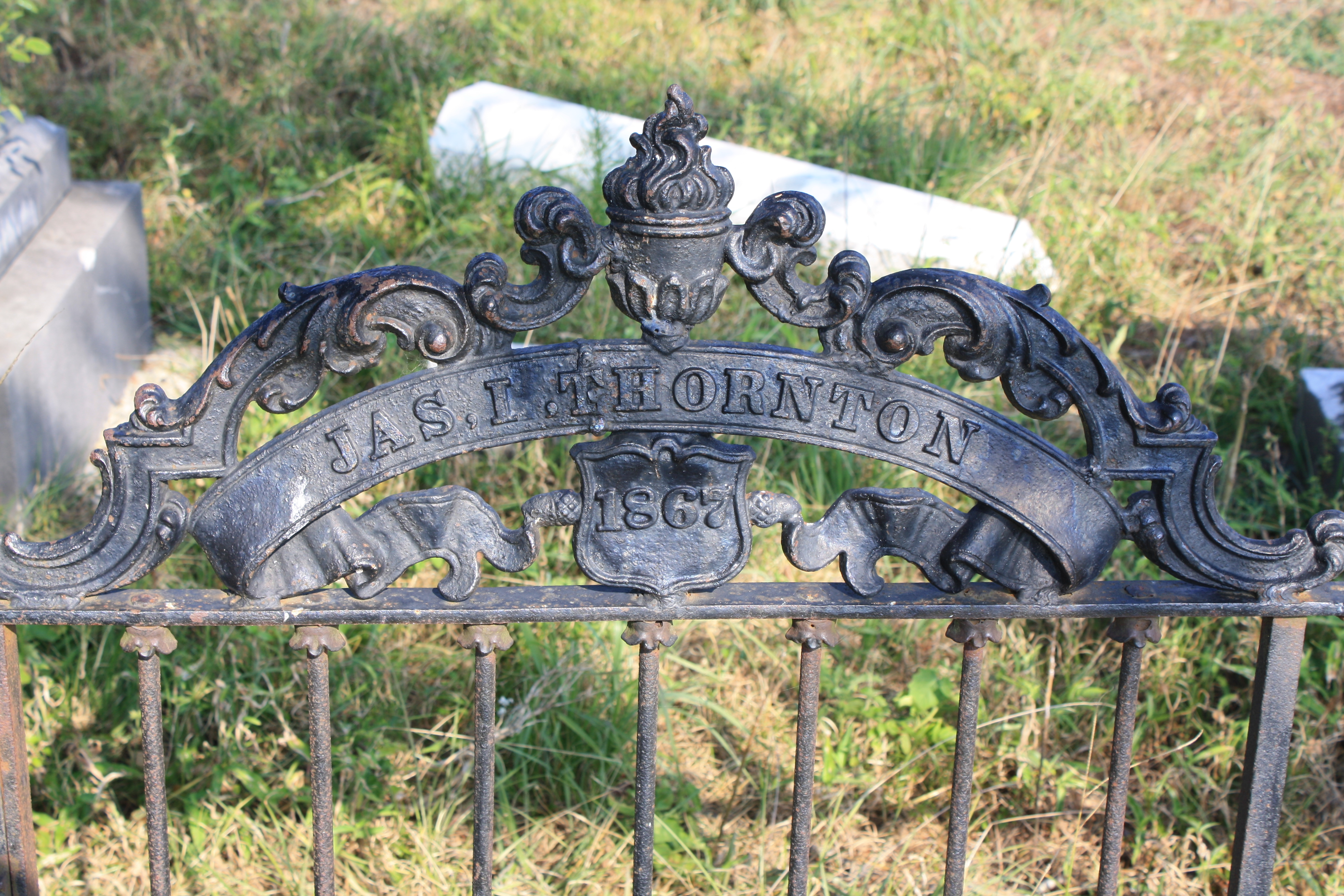
Gate to the family cemetery in September 2011, following damage from a tornado on the grounds.

Buried in the family cemetery, located a few hundred feet east of the main house, are:

- James Innes Thornton (October 28, 1800 - September 13, 1877)
- Anne Amelia Smith Thornton (February 14, 1812 - August 2, 1864), his second wife. She had two sisters who married Virginians and came to live in Greene County. Mary Virginia Smith married Dr. Philip Lewis Lightfoot and lived at "Morven", named for the Lightfoot family home in Virginia. The younger sister, Sally Innes Smith, married Colonel George Willis and spent the spring and fall at their Greene County home, "Ben Lomond", on their semi-annual journeys between their home in Virginia, and their winter home in Florida. The homes of these three sisters, "Thornhill", "Morven", and "Ben Lomond" were quite near each other. Morven was on the same ridge as Thornhill (north one mile), and Ben Lomond was on the ridge across the road from Thornhill (northwest 1/2 mile).
- James Innes Thornton Jr. (December 1, 1835 - December 12, 1837), his son.
- Fitzgerald Thornton (October 6, 1837 - July 6, 1939), his son.
- Catherine (Kate) Marshall Thornton (September 30, 1842 - October 27, 1870), his daughter. She was re-interred from Nevada in 1906. She married her first cousin Harry Innes Thornton, whose father, the senior Harry Innes Thornton was Justice of the Alabama Supreme Court. Buried with Kate are her two daughters who were also reinterred with her from Nevada. Her husband Harry is buried in California.
- Harry Innes Thornton (May 18, 1848 - May 30, 1900), his son. Second occupant.
- Sallie A. Blocker Thornton (1849 - 1924), his daughter-in-law.
- Bettie Cooper Thornton (September 19, 1876 - July 16, 1878), his granddaughter.
- Harry Innes Thornton (January 18, 1883 - 1938), his grandson. A veteran of the Spanish-American War.
- George Francis Thornton (December 10, 1885 - July 14, 1889), his grandson.

Grandson James Innes Thornton (March 10, 1873 - July 23, 19510, third occupant, is buried in Eutaw's Mesopotamia Cemetery, next to his second wife, Helen Williamson Allison Thornton (February 15, 1890 – December 12, 1963). His first wife, Betty Woolf Thornton (April 23, 1887 – September 22, 1932), was re-interred from Thornhill (after her family learned that Innes was going to be buried in Eutaw with his second wife Helen) in the Dayton Cemetery.

Thornton's first wife, Mary Amelia Glover Thornton, is buried in the Glover Mausoleum at Riverside Cemetery, Demopolis. His third wife, Sarah Williams Gould Gowdy Thornton (June 11, 1824 – August 23, 1885), is buried in the Bethsalem Cemetery, Boligee. She was the sister of Thornton's son in law John McKee Gould.
