= Forkland, Alabama =

- Town
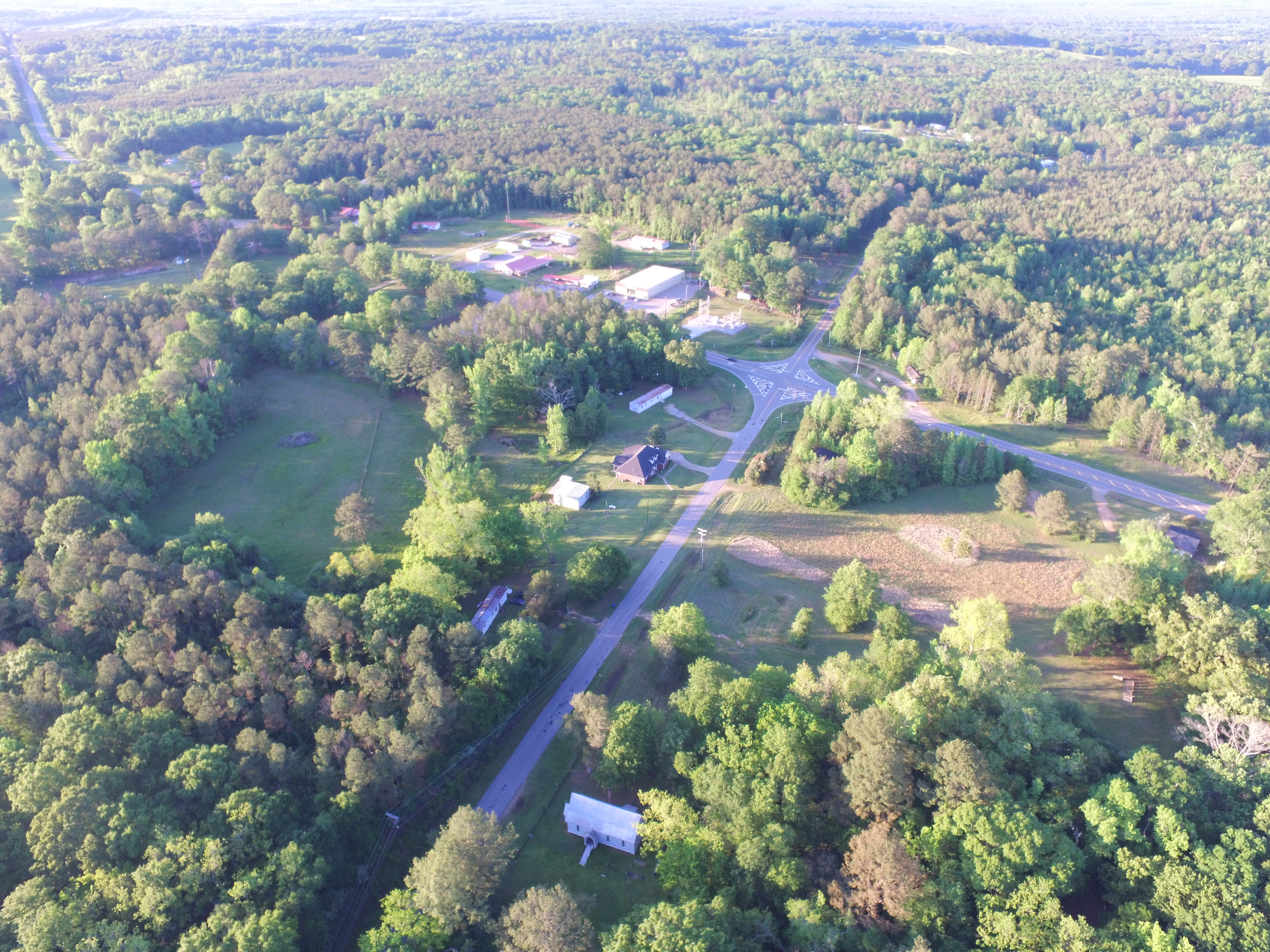

- Location of Forkland in Greene County, Alabama.
- Coordinates: 32°39′03″N 87°52′24″W
- Country: United States
- State: Alabama
- County: Greene
- Incorporated (town): 1974
- Named after: The "fork" of the Tombigbee and Black Warrior Rivers

Area
  - Total: 3.51 sq mi (9.08 km^{2})
  - Land: 3.49 sq mi (9.05 km^{2})
  - Water: 0.012 sq mi (0.03 km^{2})
- Elevation: 148 ft (45 m)

Population (2020)
  - Total: 445
  - Density: 127.3/sq mi (49.17/km^{2})
- Time zone: UTC-6 (Central (CST))
  - Summer (DST): UTC-5 (CDT)
- ZIP code: 36740
- Area code: 334
- FIPS code: 01-27376
- GNIS feature ID: 2406506
- Website: https://www.forkland.com/

Forkland is a town in Greene County, Alabama, United States. At the 2020 census, the population was 445. The town was incorporated in 1974.

== History ==
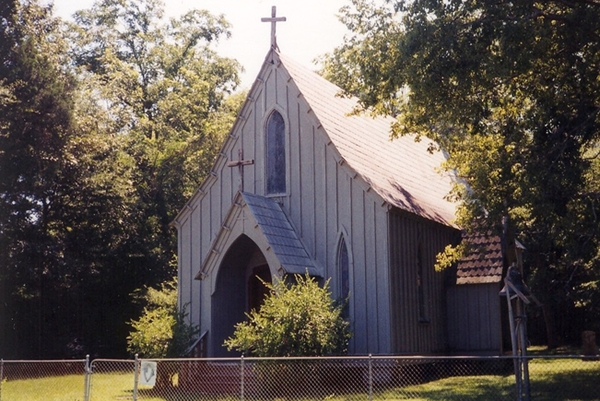
St. John's-In-The-Prairie

Forkland has one site on the National Register of Historic Places, St. John's-In-The-Prairie, built in 1859, and two sites nearby, Rosemount and Thornhill.

== Geography ==
Forkland is located in southern Greene County between the Black Warrior River 4 miles (6 km) to the east and the Tombigbee River 2 miles (3 km) to the west. The Black Warrior joins the Tombigbee 9 miles (14 km) to the south of Forkland, just north of Demopolis. U.S. Route 43 passes through Forkland, leading north 14 miles (23 km) to Eutaw, the county seat, and south 10 miles (16 km) to Demopolis.

According to the U.S. Census Bureau, Forkland has a total area of 3.5 square miles (9.1 km^{2}), of which 0.01 square miles (0.03 km^{2}), or 0.32%, is water.

== Demographics ==
Historical population
Census	Pop.	Note	%±
1880	205		—
1970	304		—
1980	429		41.1%
1990	667		55.5%
2000	629		−5.7%
2010	649		3.2%
2020	445		−31.4%
U.S. Decennial Census; 2010 2020

=== 2020 census ===
Forkland town, Alabama – Racial and ethnic composition Note: the US Census treats Hispanic/Latino as an ethnic category. This table excludes Latinos from the racial categories and assigns them to a separate category. Hispanics/Latinos may be of any race.
Race / Ethnicity (NH = Non-Hispanic)	Pop 2010	Pop 2020	% 2010	% 2020
White alone (NH)	77	43	11.86%	9.66%
Black or African American alone (NH)	563	391	86.75%	87.87%
Native American or Alaska Native alone (NH)	1	2	0.15%	0.45%
Asian alone (NH)	0	0	0.00%	0.00%
Pacific Islander alone (NH)	0	0	0.00%	0.00%
Some Other Race alone (NH)	0	0	0.00%	0.00%
Mixed Race or Multi-Racial (NH)	3	8	0.46%	1.80%
Hispanic or Latino (any race)	5	1	0.77%	0.22%
Total	649	445	100.00%	100.00%

=== 2000 Census ===
As of the census of 2000, there were 629 people, 245 households, and 161 families residing in the town. The population density was 180.2 inhabitants per square mile (69.6/km^{2}). There were 309 housing units at an average density of 88.5 per square mile (34.2/km^{2}). The racial makeup of the town was 10.65% White, 89.19% Black or African American, and 0.16% from two or more races.

There were 245 households, out of which 36.3% had children under the age of 18 living with them, 35.5% were married couples living together, 27.8% had a female householder with no husband present, and 33.9% were non-families. 32.7% of all households were made up of individuals, and 10.6% had someone living alone who was 65 years of age or older. The average household size was 2.57 and the average family size was 3.32.

In the town, the population was spread out, with 31.8% under the age of 18, 6.8% from 18 to 24, 26.1% from 25 to 44, 24.5% from 45 to 64, and 10.8% who were 65 years of age or older. The median age was 34 years. For every 100 females, there were 88.3 males. For every 100 females age 18 and over, there were 77.3 males.

The median income for a household in the town was $18,698, and the median income for a family was $22,115. Males had a median income of $24,375 versus $16,544 for females. The per capita income for the town was $9,314. About 29.5% of families and 31.5% of the population were below the poverty line, including 38.2% of those under age 18 and 31.0% of those age 65 or over.

== Notable people ==
- Maxie Baughan, former NFL player
- Charlotte Durante, first African American female city commissioner in Delray Beach, Florida
- Bobo Jenkins, born in Forkland, electric blues guitarist and songwriter
- Lloyd Leftwich, state senator during the Reconstruction era

== Gallery ==
Photographs of Forkland structures were taken for the Historic American Buildings Survey in 1933:

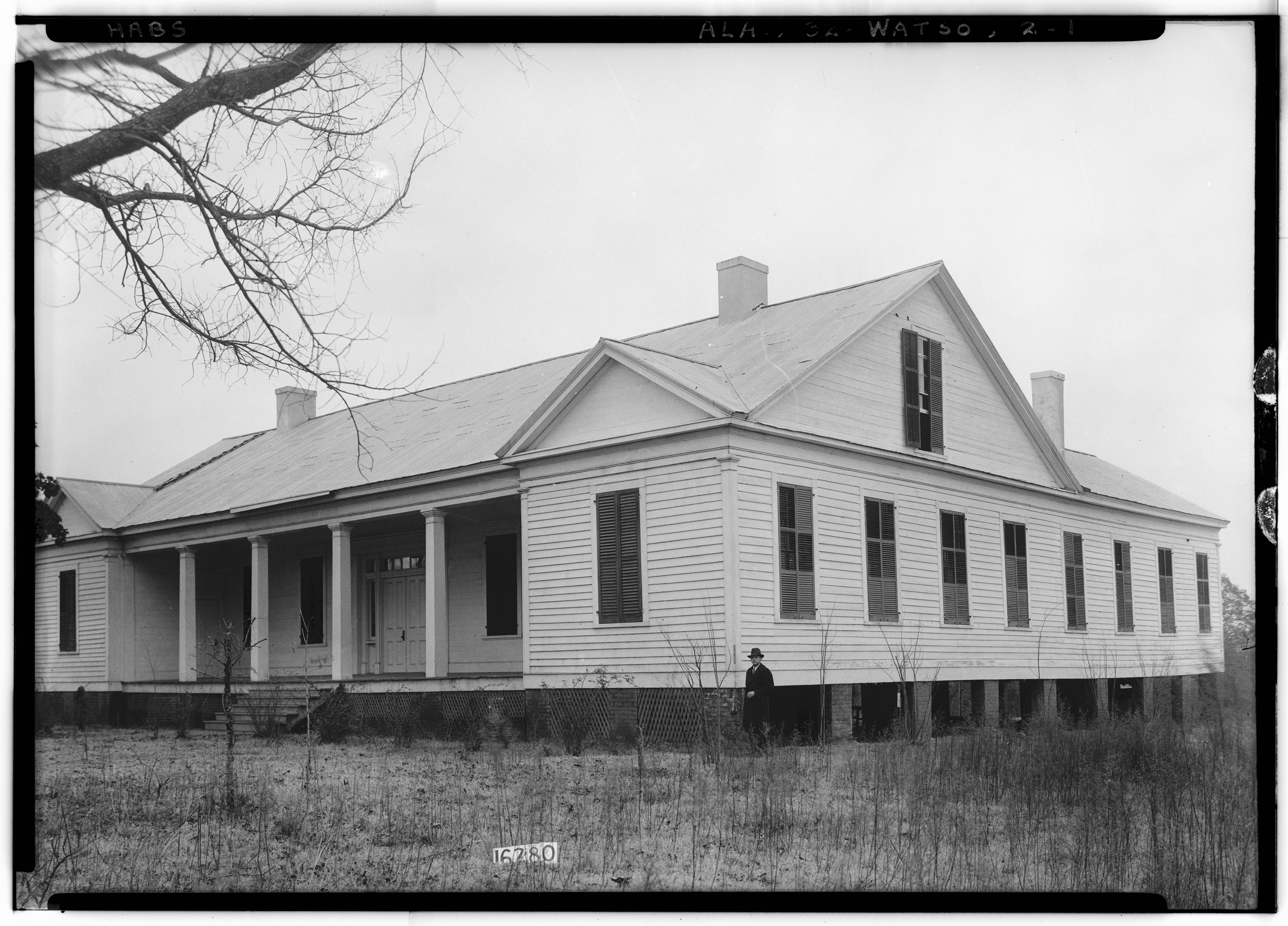
Perrin-Willis House

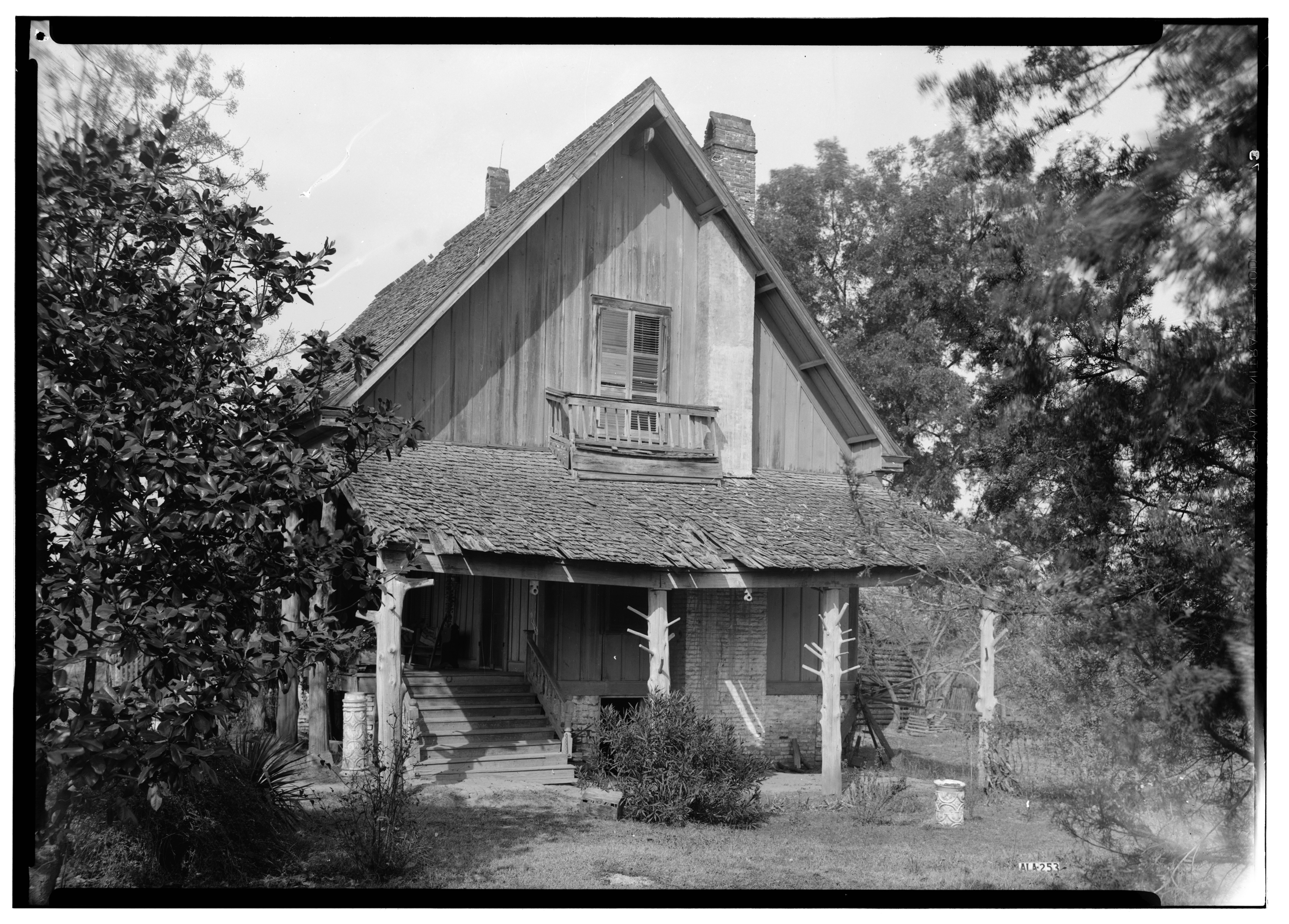
Virginia Glover House

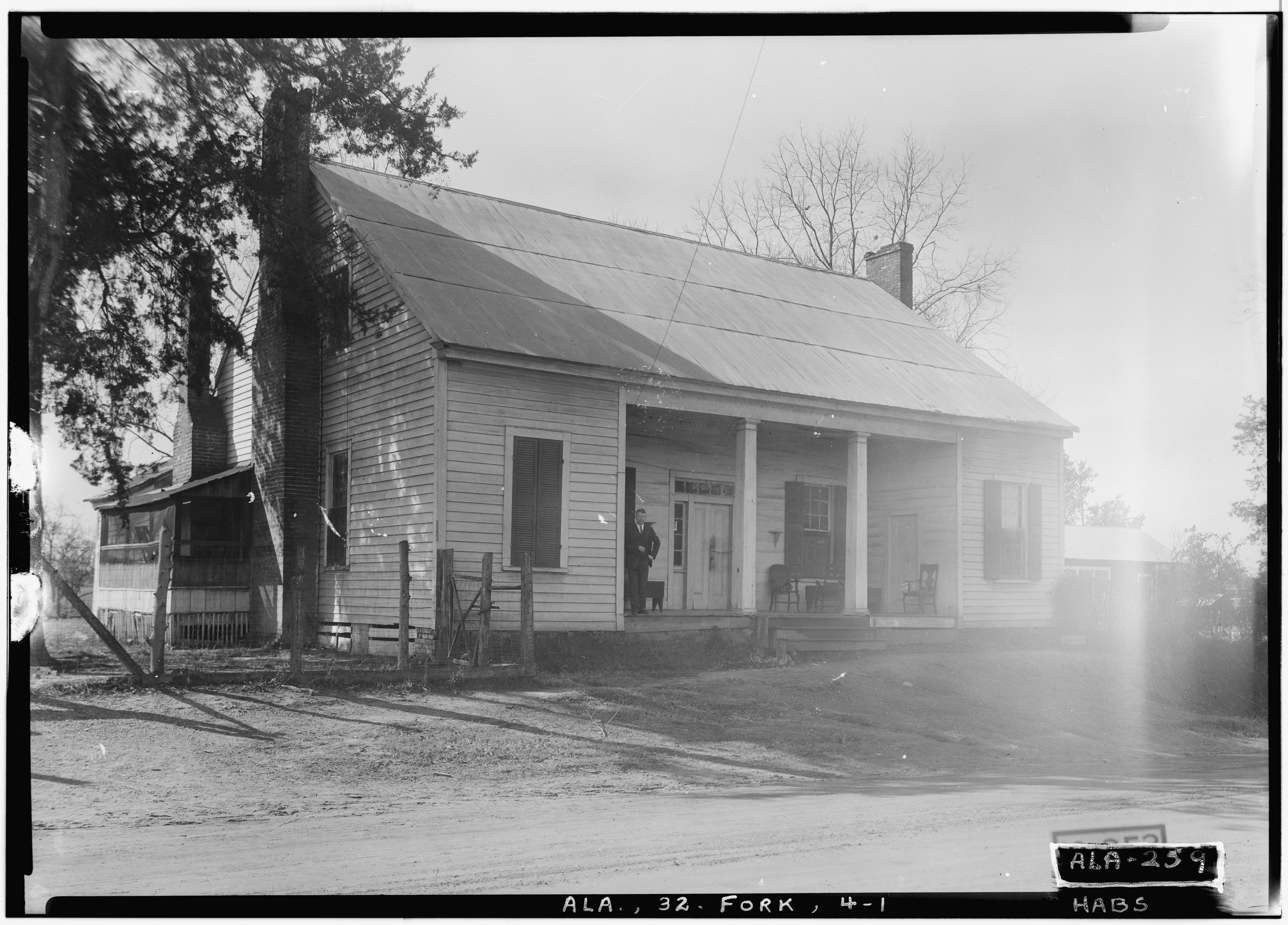
The Tavern

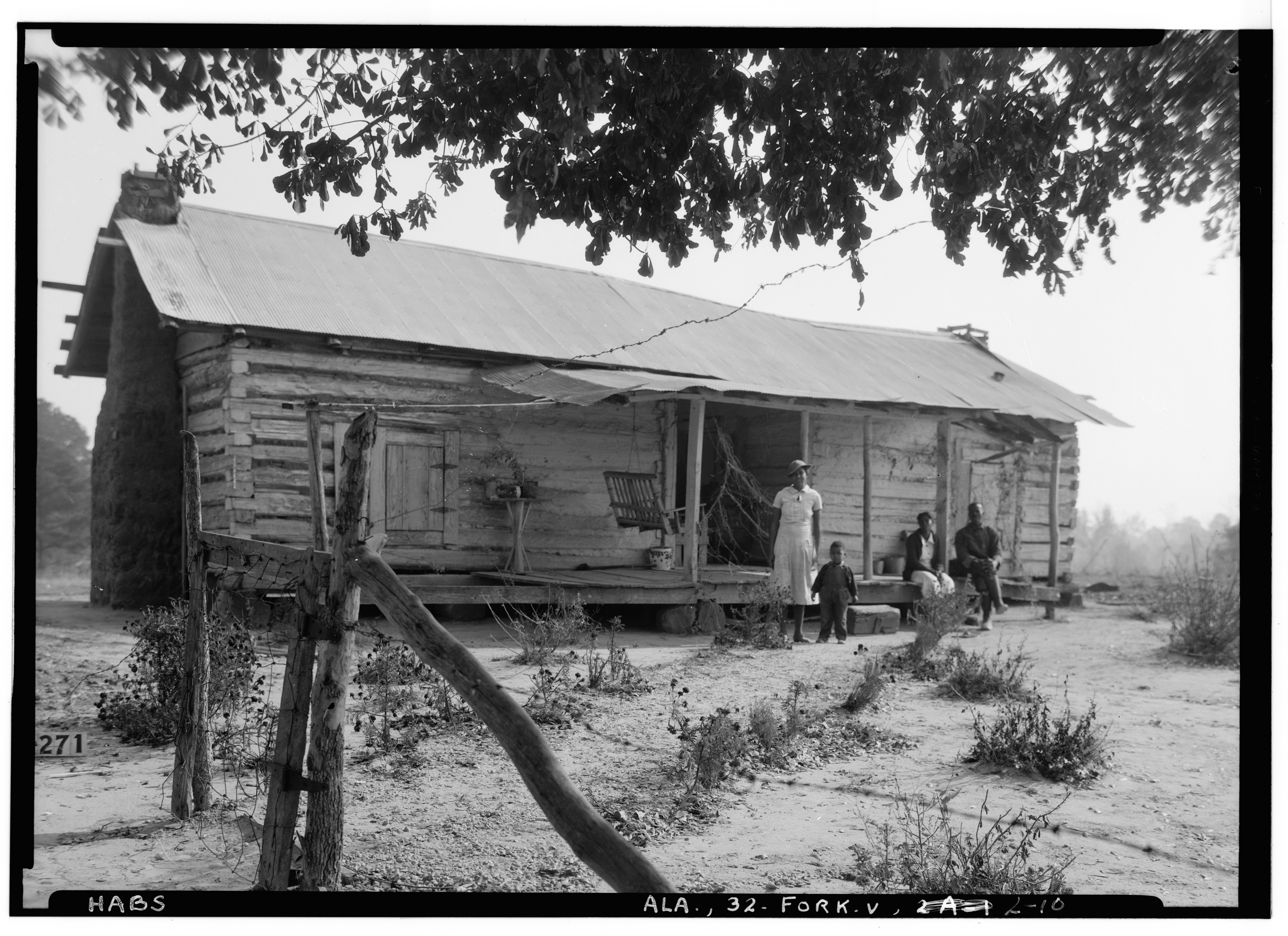
Old slave house at Strawberry Hill Plantation

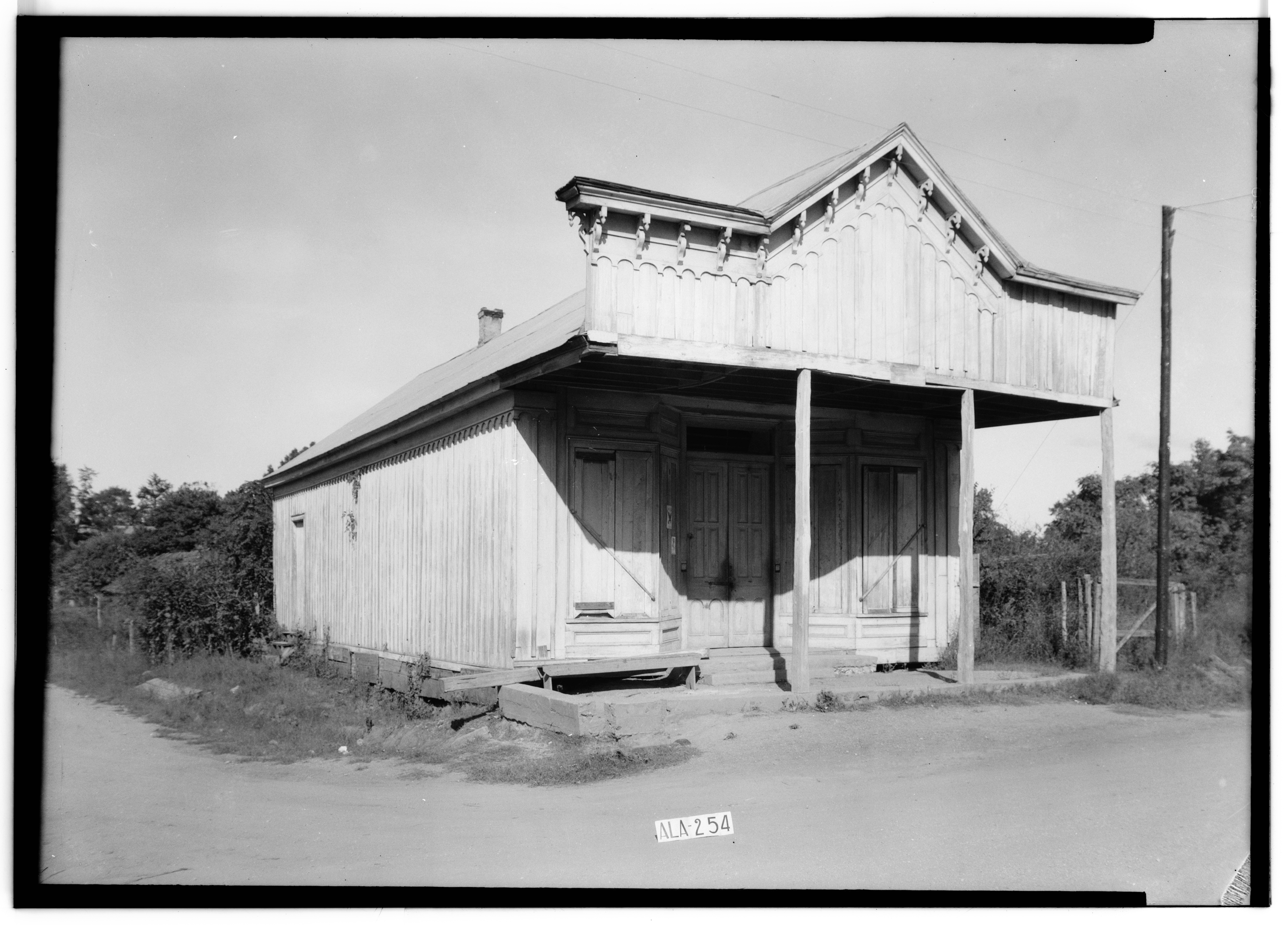
Levy-Glover Store

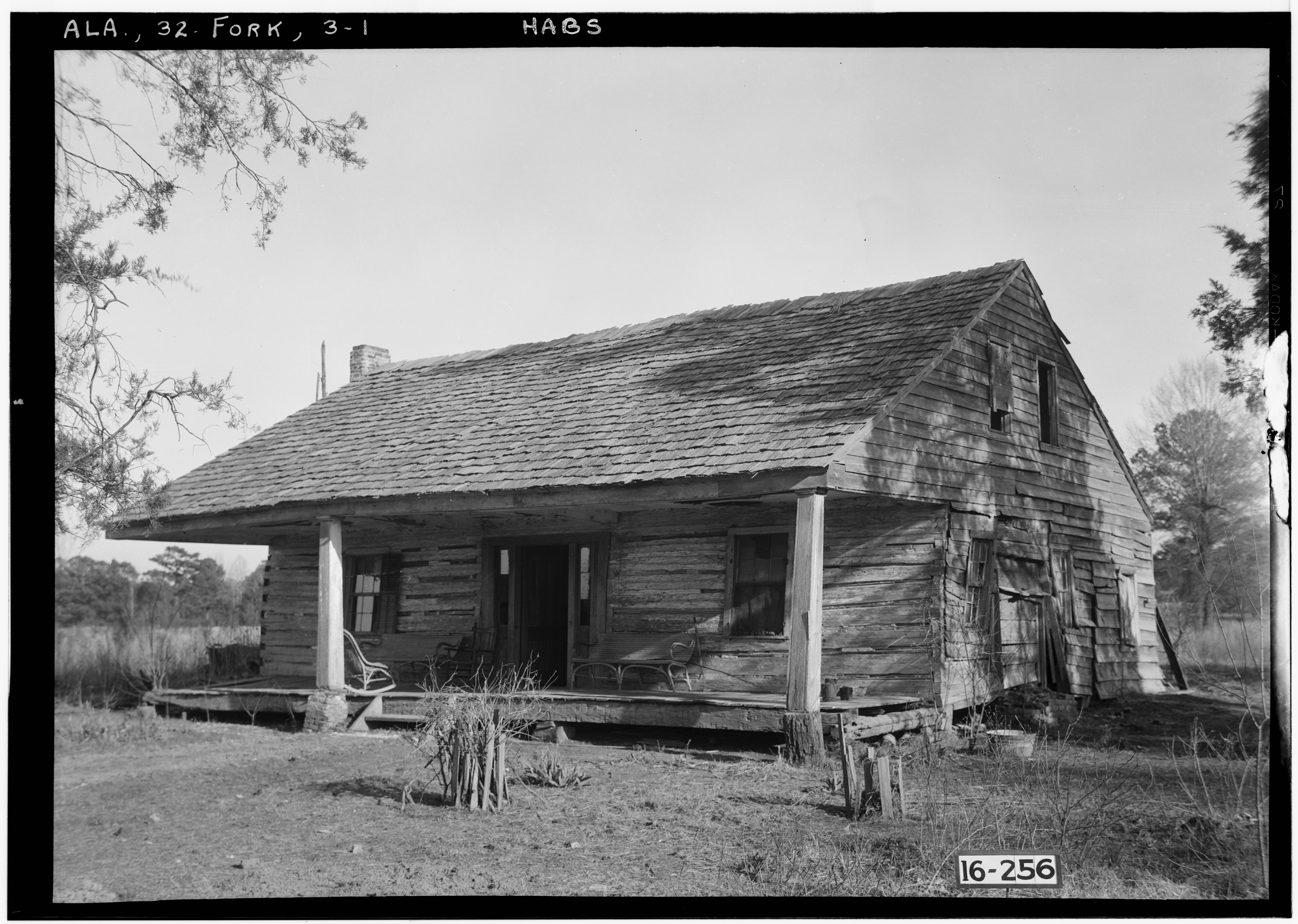
Methodist parsonage

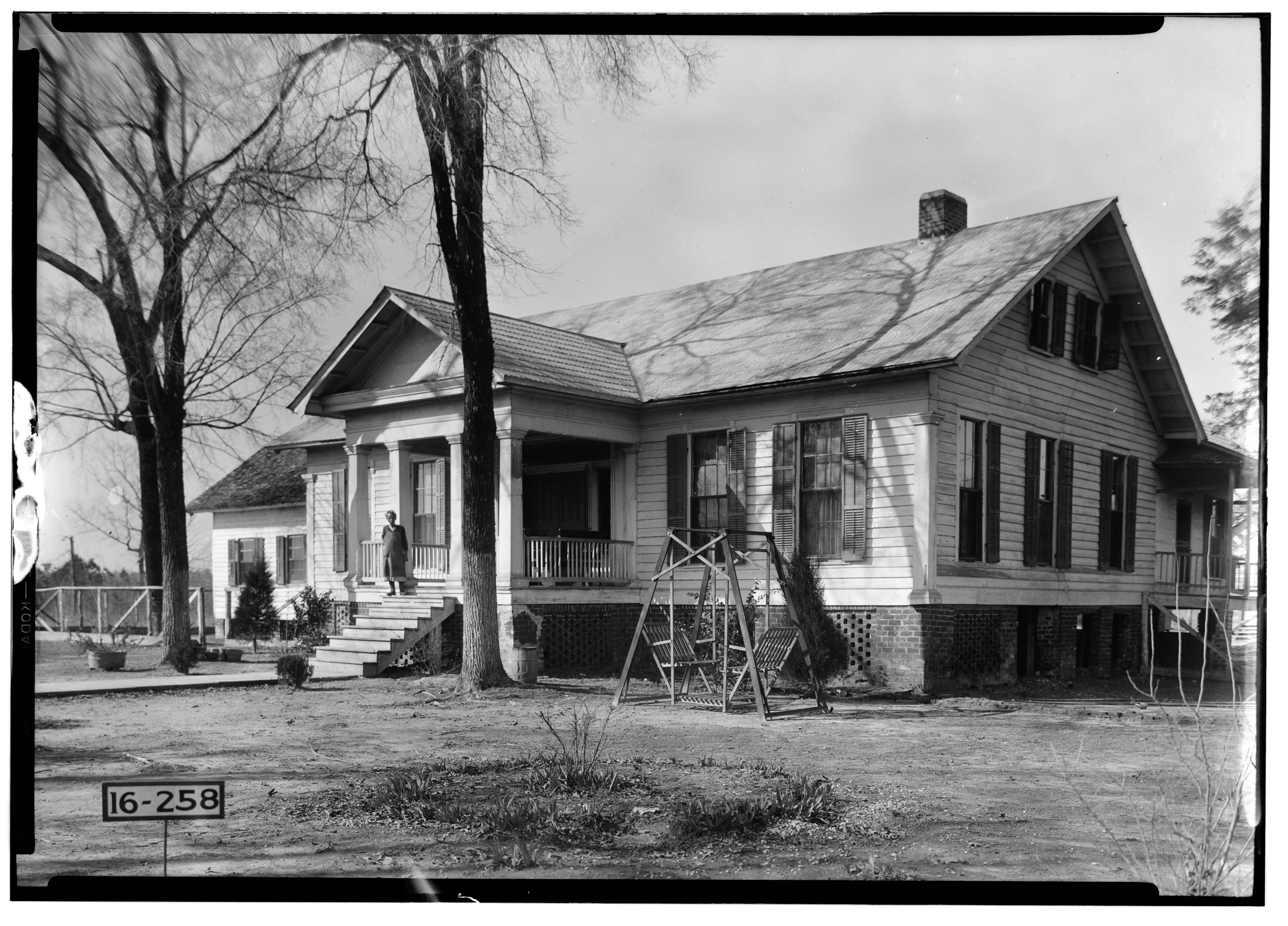
H. B. Brewer House
