= William Nichols (architect) =

English-born architect (1780–1853)

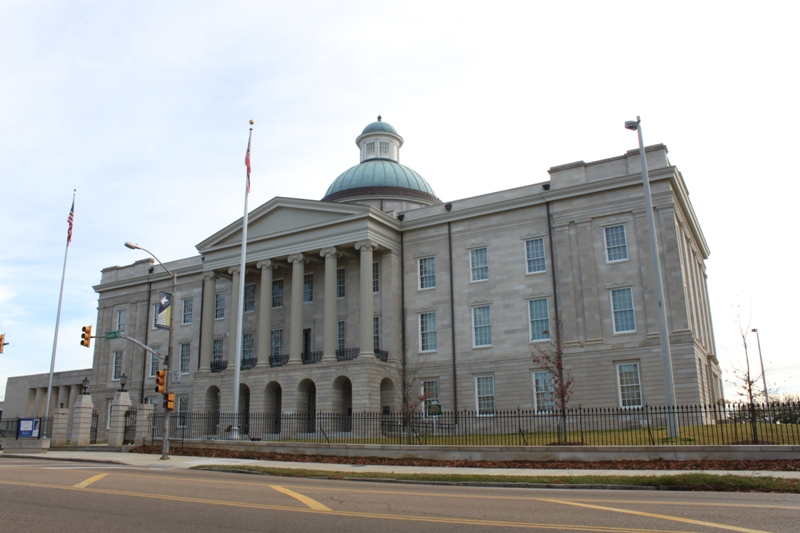
- Old Mississippi State Capitol building in 2010
- Born: 1780; Bath, England
- Died: December 12, 1853 (aged 72–73); Lexington, Mississippi, United States
- Occupation: Architect
- Buildings: Old North Carolina State Capitol; Old Alabama State Capitol; Old Mississippi State Capitol

William Nichols, Sr. (1780 – December 12, 1853) was an English-born architect who emigrated to the United States and became most famous for his early Neoclassical-style buildings in the American South. He designed statehouses for North Carolina, Alabama and Mississippi.

== Biography ==
William Nichols was born in 1780 in Bath, a center for English Palladian and Adam-style architecture in the 18th century. He was brought up in a family of builders, learning the trade through them. Nichols emigrated to North Carolina in 1800, initially settling in the New Bern area. He married Mary Rew in 1805 and had taken his first apprentice by 1806. His earliest commissions in the area remain unclear, although several buildings have been suggested as candidates. He applied for American citizenship in 1813, and in 1815, following the death of his first wife, married Sarah Simons.

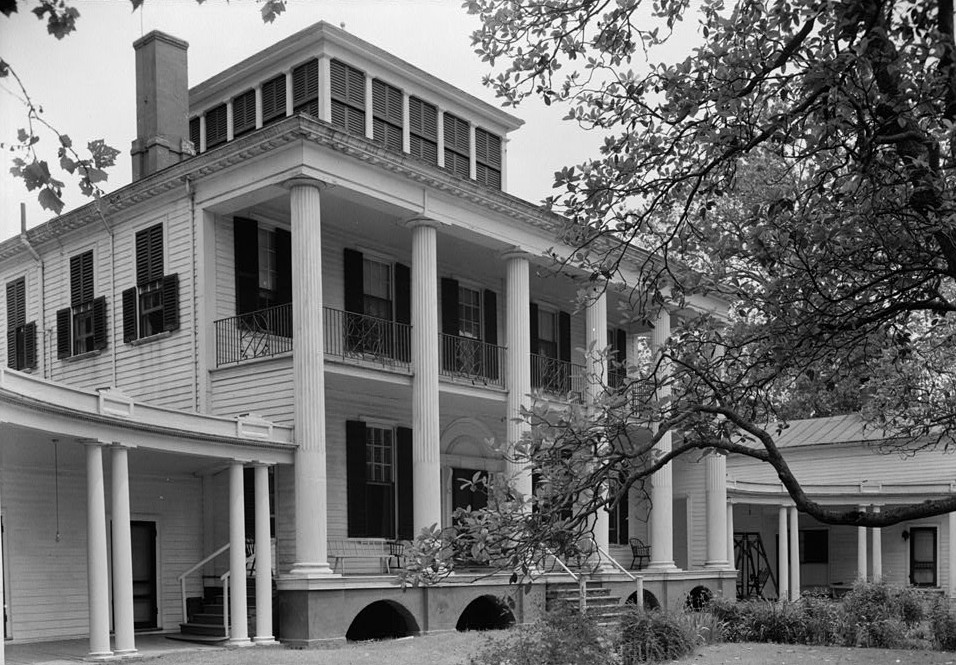
Hayes Plantation House, completed in 1817 in Edenton, North Carolina.

In 1818 Nichols was employed as state architect of North Carolina. This made him responsible for new state buildings and for repairs and improvements to existing ones. His most important commission during this time, however, was a complete remodeling of the old North Carolina State House, which he completed in 1822. Incorporating Palladian and early Greek Revival elements, it included a new central rotunda surmounted by a dome. The Senate chamber and House of Commons both included galleries supported by Ionic columns. Widely admired at the time, it drew the praise of fellow architect Ithiel Town. Another of his jobs was the 1825 remodeling of the Governor's Palace at the end of Fayetteville Street in Raleigh, which included the addition of a monumental Ionic portico. It was abandoned following the Civil War and eventually demolished. Nichols was involved in numerous private projects during this time, as well as projects at the University of North Carolina.

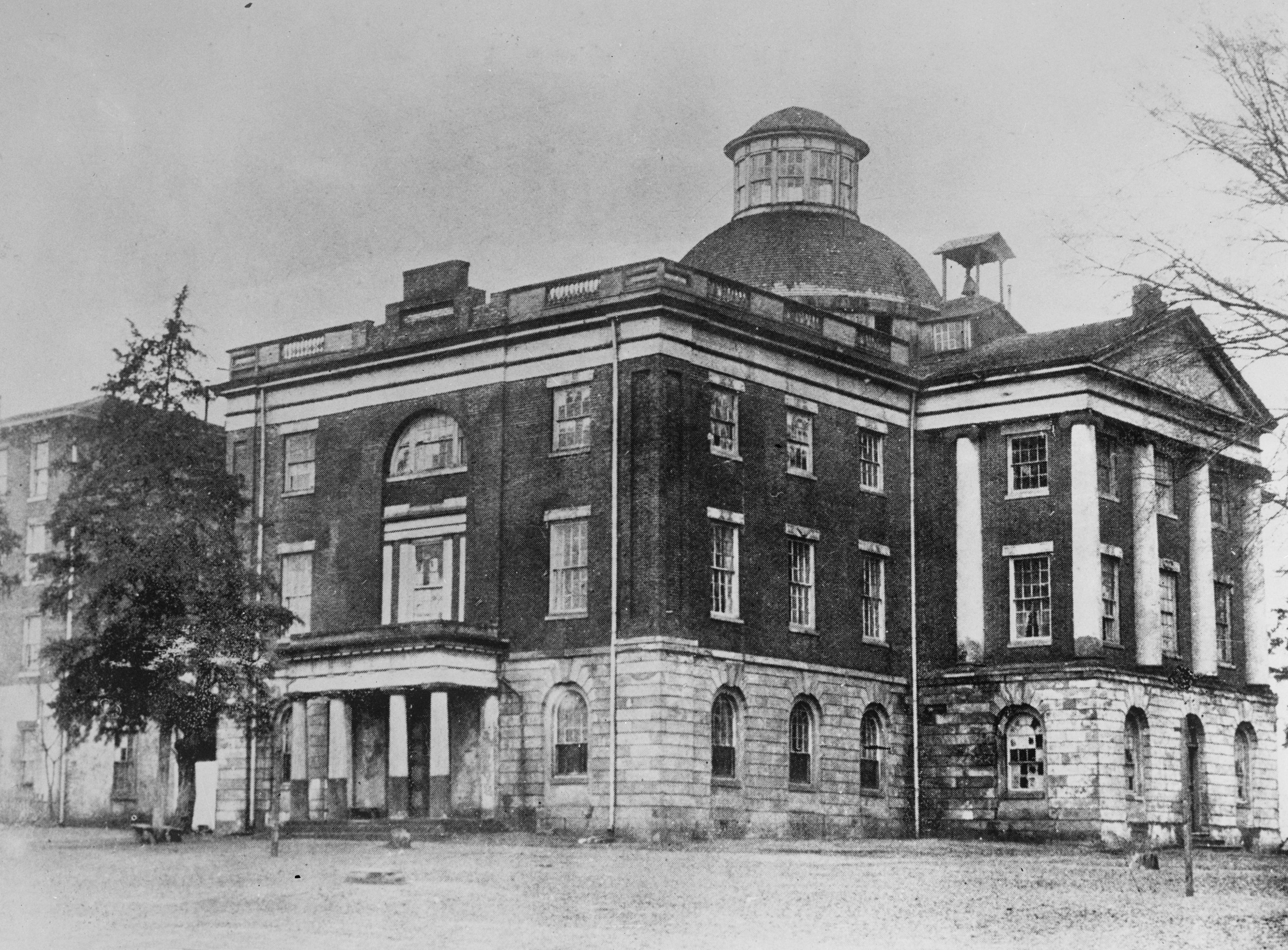
The Old Alabama State Capitol building in Tuscaloosa, Alabama. Completed during the late-1820s and destroyed in 1923. Stabilized ruins of the central rotunda and architectural fragments remain in situ.

Nichols relocated to Alabama in 1827, after receiving a commission from the legislature there to become the new state architect and build a state capitol building in the new capital of Tuscaloosa. The new capitol building was cruciform in plan, the second and third floors resting upon a high rusticated stone basement. The main eastern facade featured a gabled pseudo-portico with Ionic columns. The ground level contained main entrances, with identical north and south one-story porticoes supported by Doric columns, each column carved from a single shaft of sandstone. A dome surmounted the central rotunda and was topped by a lantern that admitted light into the space.

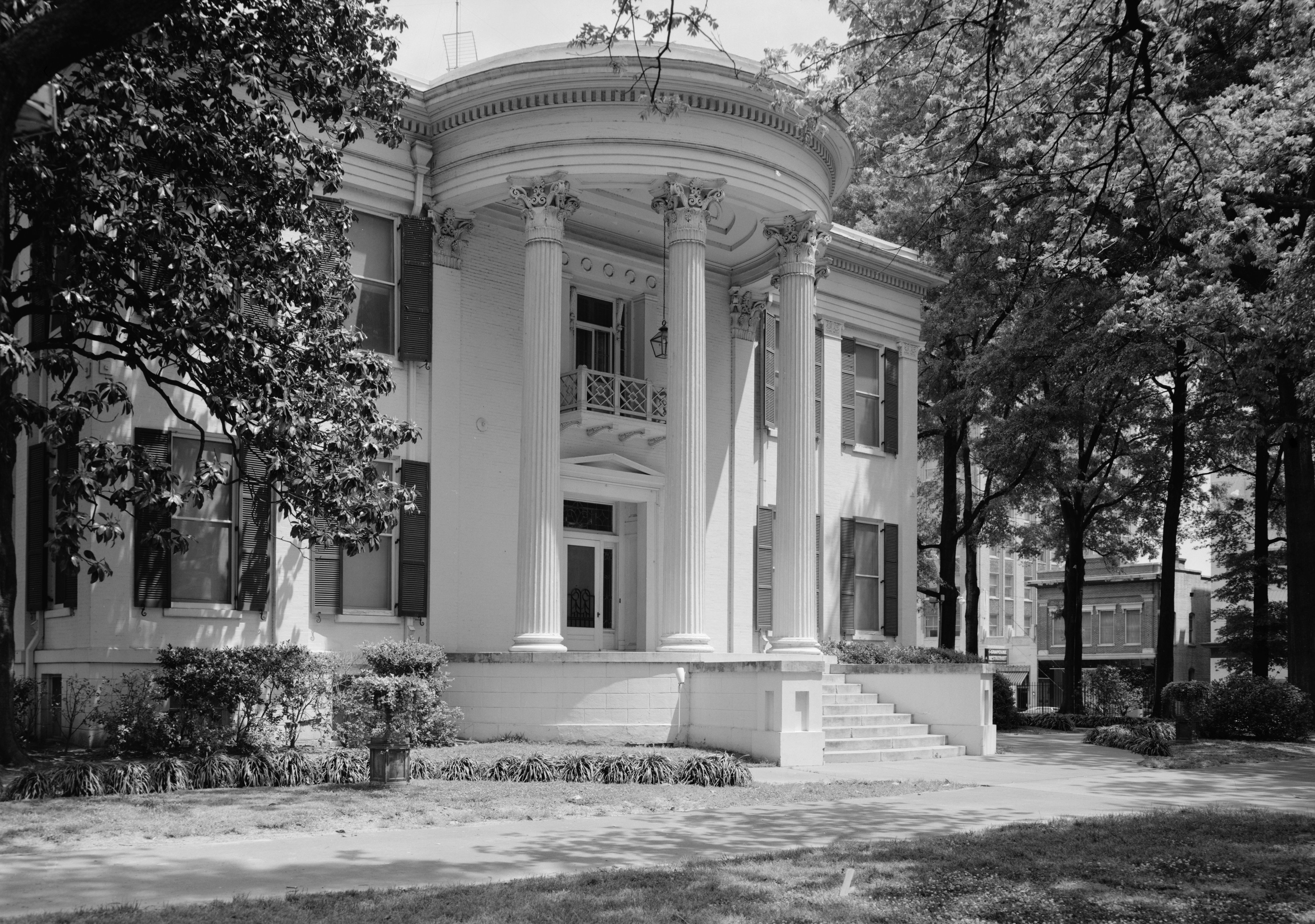
The Mississippi Governors Mansion, completed in 1839. Still used for its intended purpose.

While working on the Alabama statehouse, Nichols also designed the original campus for the newly established University of Alabama. Influenced by Thomas Jefferson's plan at the University of Virginia, the campus featured a 70-foot (21 m) wide, 70-foot (21 m) high domed rotunda building that served as the library and nucleus of the campus. This building and all but one of Nichols' structures were burned to the ground by the Union Army on April 4, 1865.

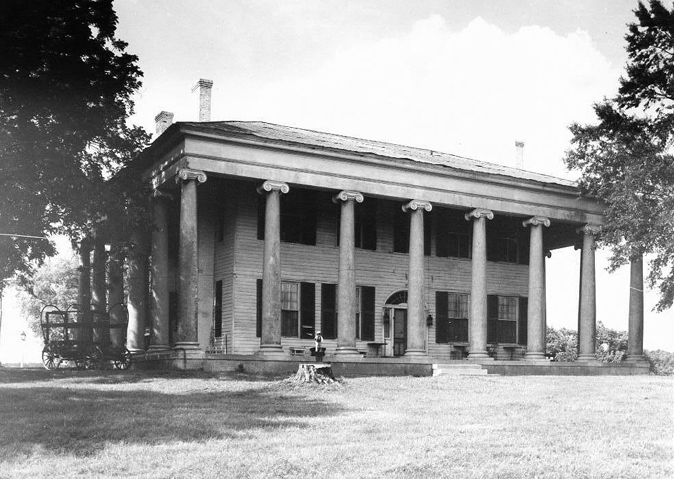
The Forks of Cypress began as a Federal-style house in 1820. The peripteral Ionic portico was designed by Nichols in 1830. The house was destroyed by fire in 1966. Ruined columns remain at the site.

In 1833, with a letter of recommendation from his friend, Alabama Governor John Gayle, Nichols applied for the post of state architect for Mississippi. Although he didn't receive the job at the time, he was later summoned to Jackson in 1835 to fill the post and assume construction of the new Mississippi capitol. The configuration and ornament on the new building reflected his earlier statehouses in North Carolina and Alabama, on a grander scale.

Nichols went on to design the Mississippi Governor's Mansion, completed in 1842, and the Lyceum at the University of Mississippi, completed in 1848. He died on December 12, 1853, and was interred in the Odd Fellows Cemetery in Lexington, Mississippi.

== Legacy ==
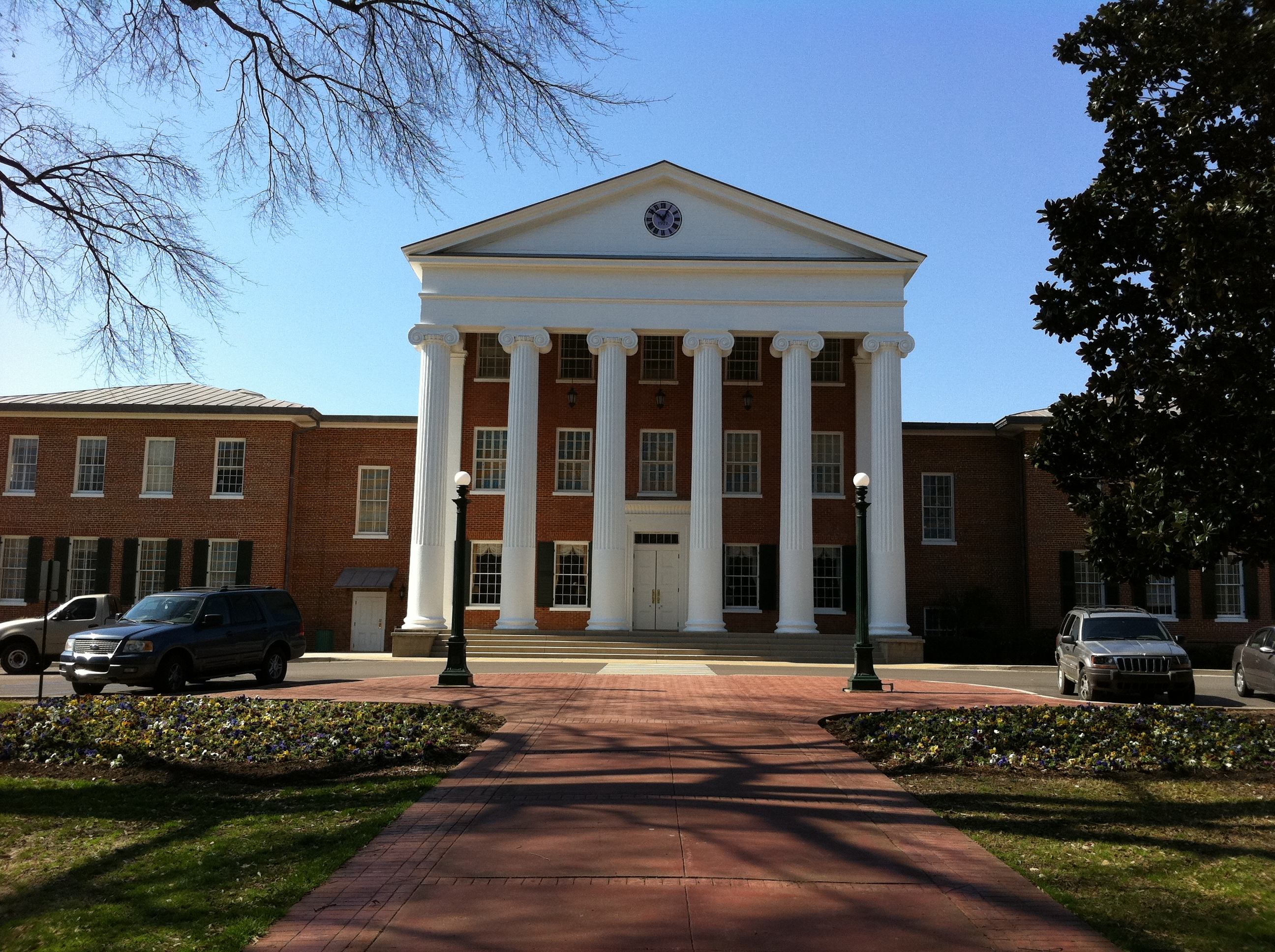
The Lyceum at the University of Mississippi, completed in 1848.

The Old Mississippi State Capitol is the only one of Nichols' three statehouses to survive. The North Carolina State House burned in 1831 during roof repairs. However, Nichols and his son, William Nichols, Jr., did contribute to the design of the new North Carolina State Capitol, completed in 1840 following additional design work by Ithiel Town, Alexander Jackson Davis, and David Paton. The capital of Alabama moved to Montgomery in 1845; the old capitol building became the Alabama Central Female College in 1857. It fulfilled that role until it too burned on August 22, 1923 during renovations. Nichols' Mississippi capitol building was used until 1903, when the state government moved several blocks away to a new capitol designed by Theodore C. Link. Initially unused, it was eventually converted to state offices. Between 1959 and 1961 it was renovated for use as a state historical museum and served that purpose until 2005 when Hurricane Katrina seriously damaged the building. After being restored from 2006 to 2009, it reopened as the Old Capitol Museum, focusing on the history of the building, Mississippi government during the time that the Old Capitol served as the capitol building, civics, and preservation .

== Projects ==
=== Extant ===
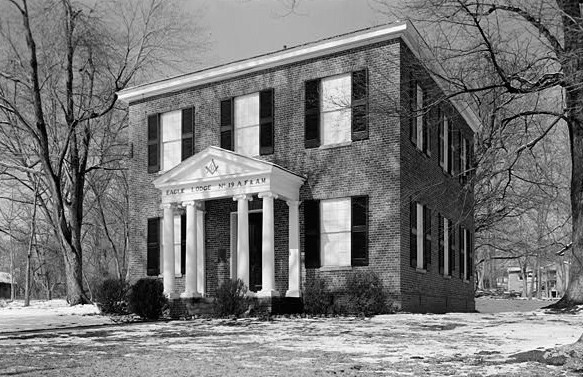
Eagle Lodge in Hillsborough, North Carolina, completed in 1823.

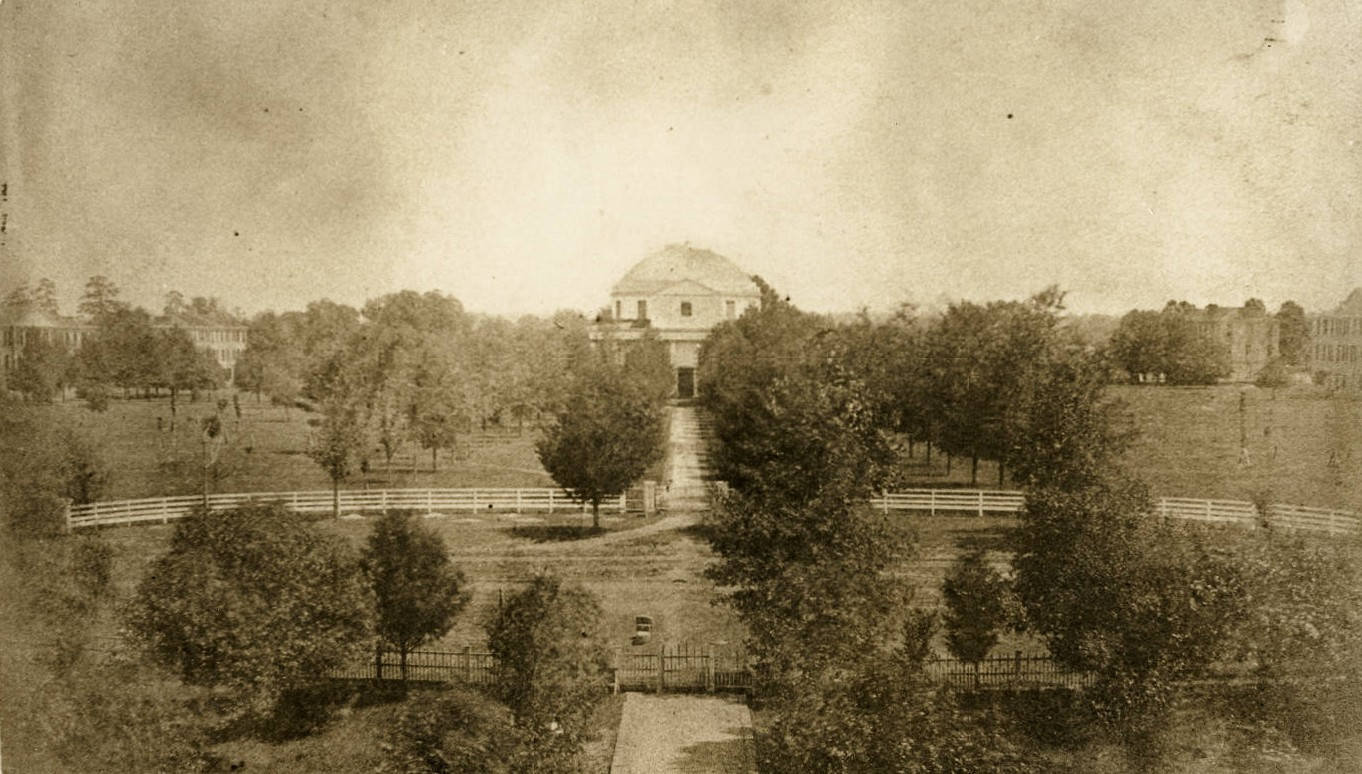
The Nichols-designed University of Alabama campus as it appeared in 1859. Destroyed in 1865.

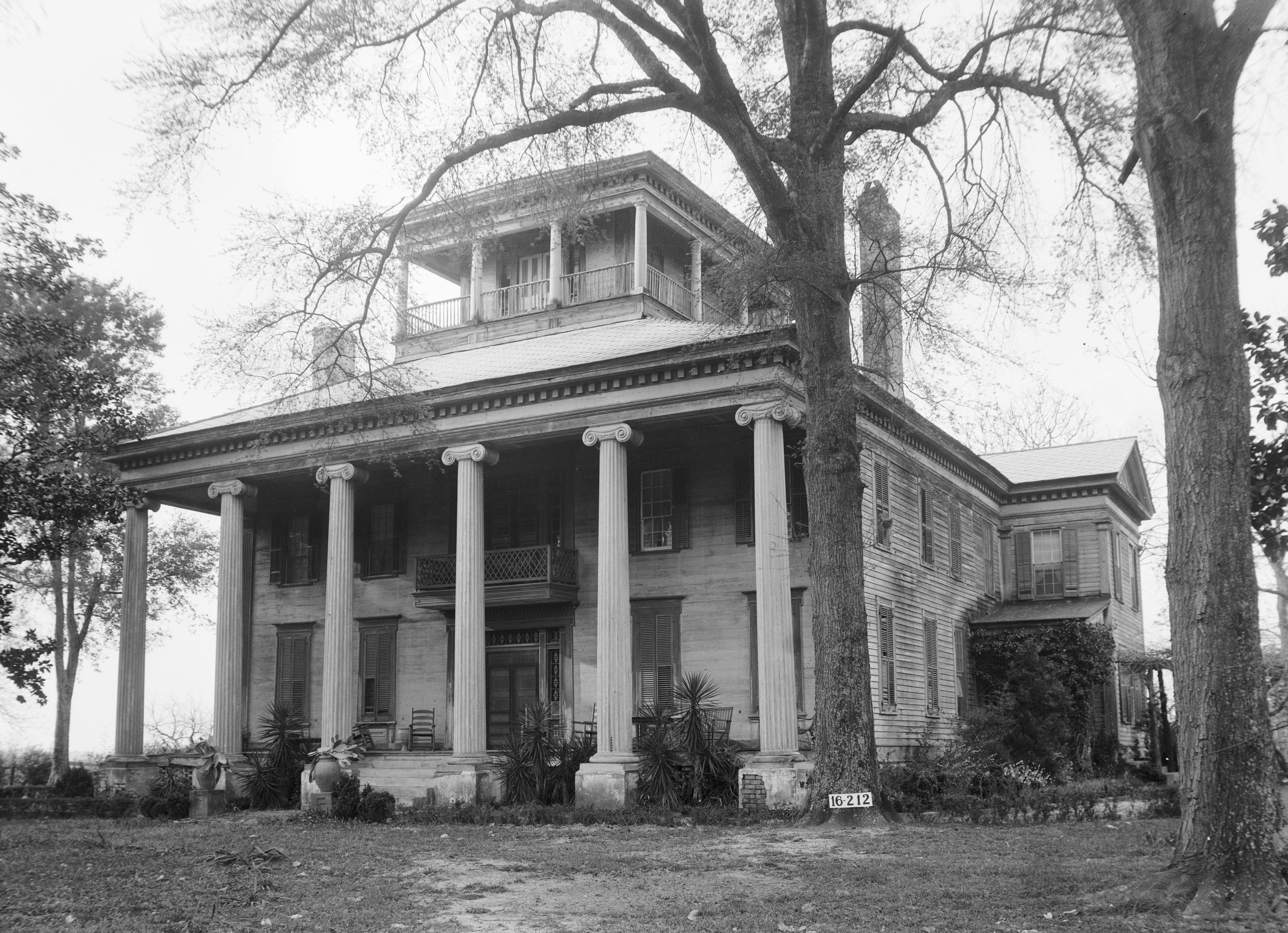
Rosemount, designed in 1832 and main block completed in 1835.

- Hayes Plantation House (1814–17) in Edenton, North Carolina.
- Gerrard Hall (1822–37) at the University of North Carolina at Chapel Hill in Chapel Hill, North Carolina.
- Old West (1822–23) at the University of North Carolina at Chapel Hill in Chapel Hill, North Carolina. (Altered 1844–48)
- Eagle Lodge (1823) in Hillsborough, North Carolina.
- Mordecai House (1824) in Raleigh, North Carolina
- Gorgas House (1829) at the University of Alabama in Tuscaloosa, Alabama. The only Nichols-designed building to survive the destruction of the campus.
- Christ Episcopal Church (1831) in Tuscaloosa, Alabama. (Altered in 1882)
- Thornhill (Designed 1831, completed 1833) near Forkland, Alabama.
- Rosemount (Designed 1832, completed 1835) near Forkland, Alabama.
- Old Mississippi State Capitol (1839) in Jackson, Mississippi.
- Mississippi Governor's Mansion (1842) in Jackson, Mississippi.
- Lyceum (1848) at the University of Mississippi in Oxford, Mississippi.

=== Destroyed ===
- North Carolina Governor's Palace (1816) in Raleigh, North Carolina
- North Carolina State House (1820–22) in Raleigh, North Carolina.
- Guilford County Courthouse (1820s) in Greensboro, North Carolina.
- Davidson County Courthouse (1824–25) in Lexington, North Carolina.
- Wake County Jail (1825) in Raleigh, North Carolina.
- Christ Episcopal Church (1826–29) in Raleigh, North Carolina.
- George E. Badger House (1827) in Raleigh, North Carolina.
- Old Alabama State Capitol (1827–29) in Tuscaloosa, Alabama.
- Forks of Cypress (1830) in Florence, Alabama.
- Original campus of the University of Alabama (1831) in Tuscaloosa, Alabama.
