= St. John's-In-The-Prairie =

Historic church in Alabama, United States

- U.S. National Register of Historic Places
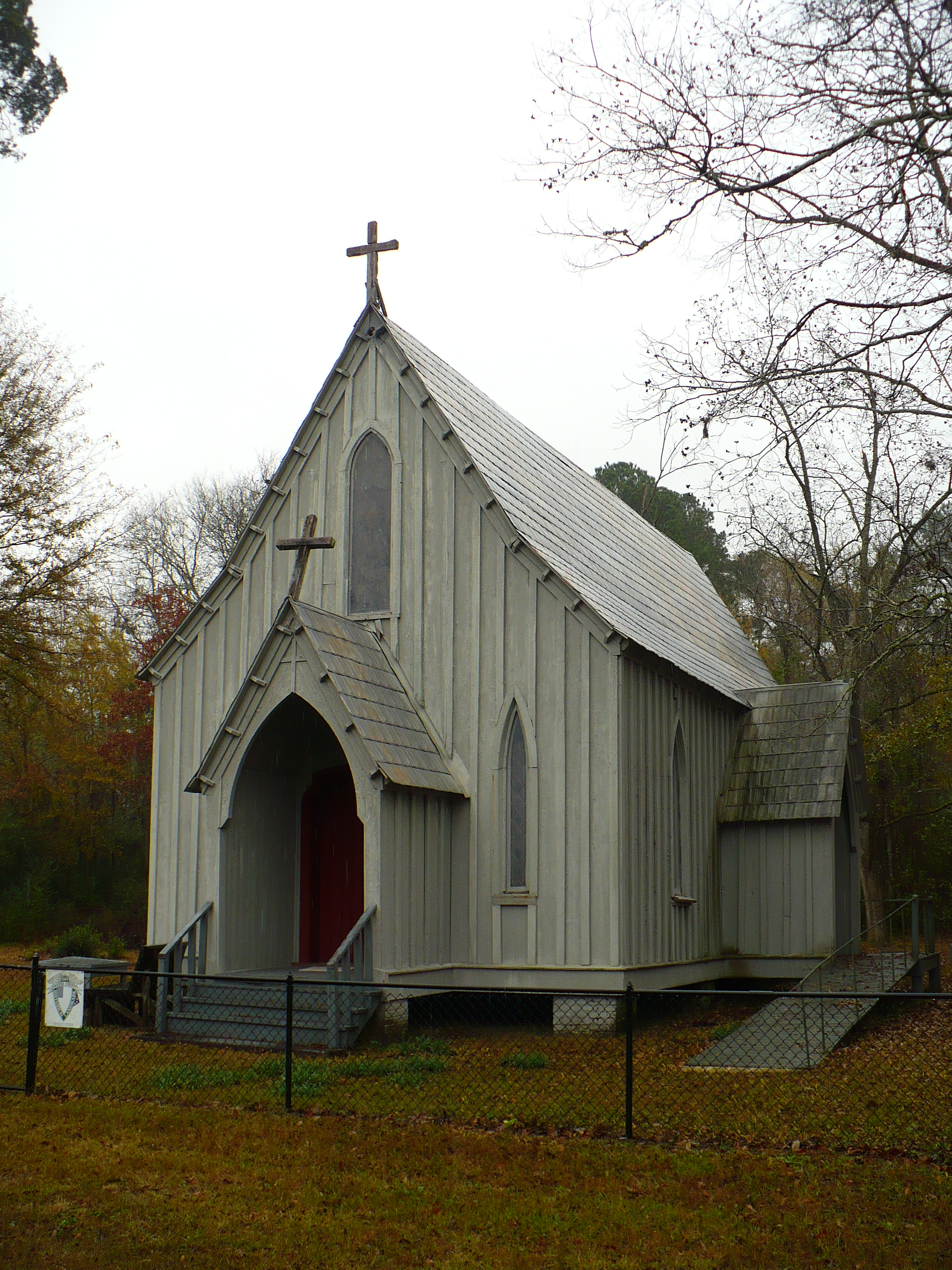
- The church in 2008

- Location within Alabama Location within the United States
- Location: SR 4, Forkland, Alabama
- Coordinates: 32°38′51″N 87°52′54″W
- Built: 1859
- Architect: Upjohn, Richard
- Architectural style: Gothic Revival
- NRHP reference No.: 75000313
- Added to NRHP: November 20, 1975

St. John's-In-The-Prairie, now known as St. John's Episcopal Church, is a historic Episcopal church in Forkland, Alabama, United States.

== History ==
The congregation was organized in 1834 by Caleb Ives, a pioneer missionary, and was admitted to parish status in 1838. The first rector was the Rev. John Avery. The wooden Gothic Revival structure was built in 1859 on a Southern plantation to the designs of Richard Upjohn. It was a Methodist church, built on a Southern plantation south of Greensboro in the Antebellum South.

After the American Civil War of 1861–1865, the Methodist planter had lost most of his assets. He ran afoul of the Methodist Episcopal Church, South after he built a saloon from the ruins of his plantation house. As a result, he decided to convert the congregation to an Episcopal church and move the building across the Black Warrior River to its present location in 1878. Others suggest he had sold alcohol to the Union Army and moved to flee veterans of the Confederate States Army.

As of 2017, the church still has several congregants.

== Heritage significance ==
It was added to the National Register of Historic Places on November 20, 1975.
