= Rain porch =

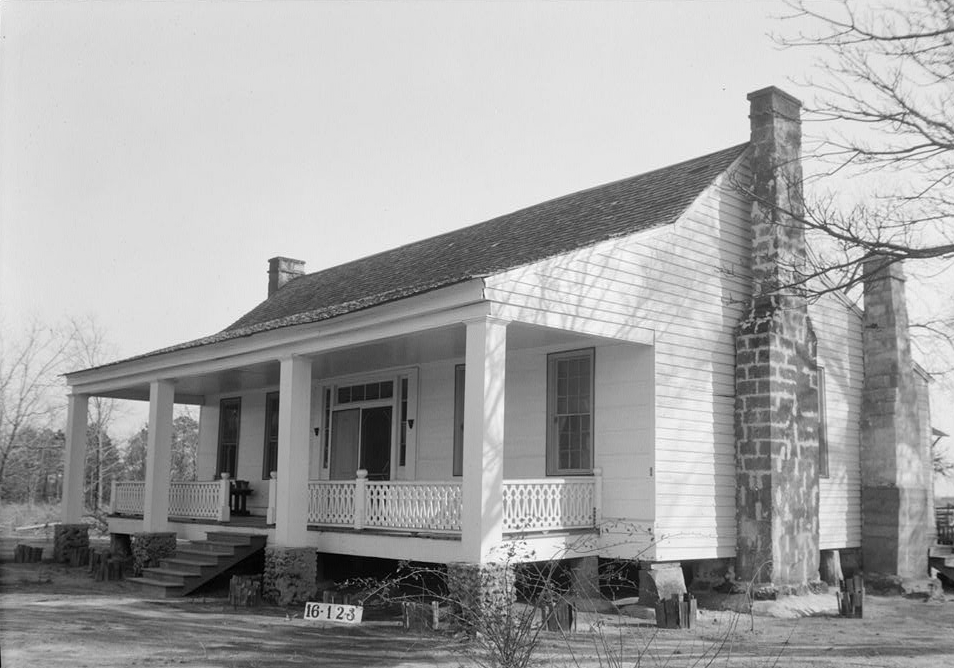
A typical shed-roofed rain porch

A rain porch, also commonly known as a Carolina porch, is a type of indigenous porch form found in the Southeastern United States. Some architectural scholars believe it to have originated along the coast of the Carolinas, hence the colloquial name.

The defining characteristic of the rain porch is a roof that extends far beyond the edge of the porch deck and is supported with freestanding supports that rise directly from ground level, rather than the floor of the porch deck. This protects the porch deck from exposure to the elements and also leaves it well shaded from the sun most of the time.

Most commonly seen on historic folk houses, the rain porch also came to be adapted to the monumental porticoes of some Greek Revival mansions, such as Rosemount and Kirkwood. The overhang became especially exaggerated in some areas with copious amounts of rainfall, such as the Eastern Shore of Mobile Bay in Alabama. Here the roof overhang ranged between 3 and 6 feet (0.91 and 1.83 m) beyond the porch deck, in effect creating a lower and upper porch.
