= Lloyd Leftwich =

Alabama politician (1832–1918)

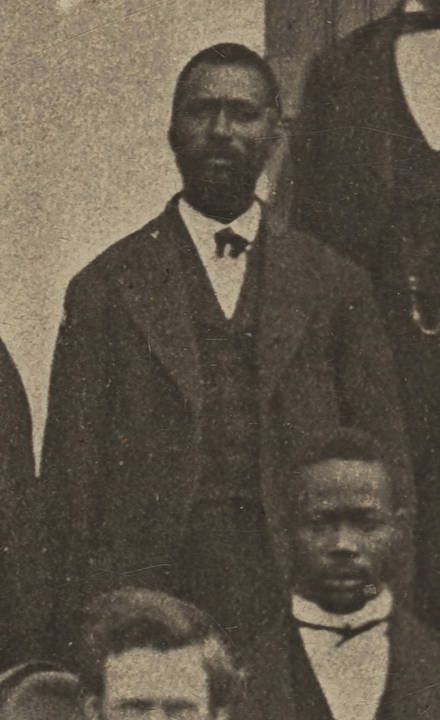

Lloyd Leftwich (1832–1918) was a state legislator in Alabama during the Reconstruction era. He was a state senator from 1872 to 1876. He was photographed with other members of the state senate in 1872.

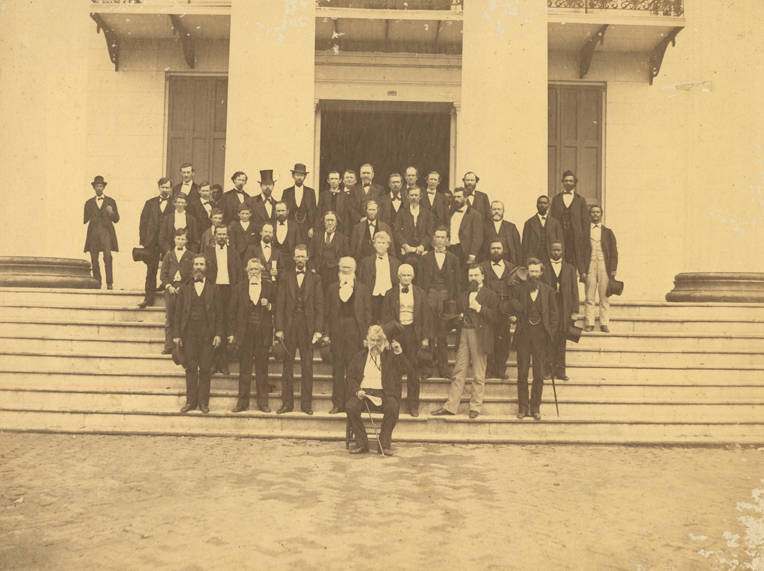
Photo of Alabama Senate members in 1872 on the capitol steps

Leftwich bought a 122-acre farm from his former owner. He and his wife had eight children. They learned to read and write. They donated land for the Lloyd Chapel Baptist Church and Lloyd Elementary School. He lived in Forkland, Alabama. His eldest child, John Carter Leftwich became a college president, founded a college, and published a newspaper.

== See also ==
- List of African-American officeholders during Reconstruction
