= Fall Hill =

Historic house in Virginia, United States

- U.S. National Register of Historic Places
- Virginia Landmarks Register
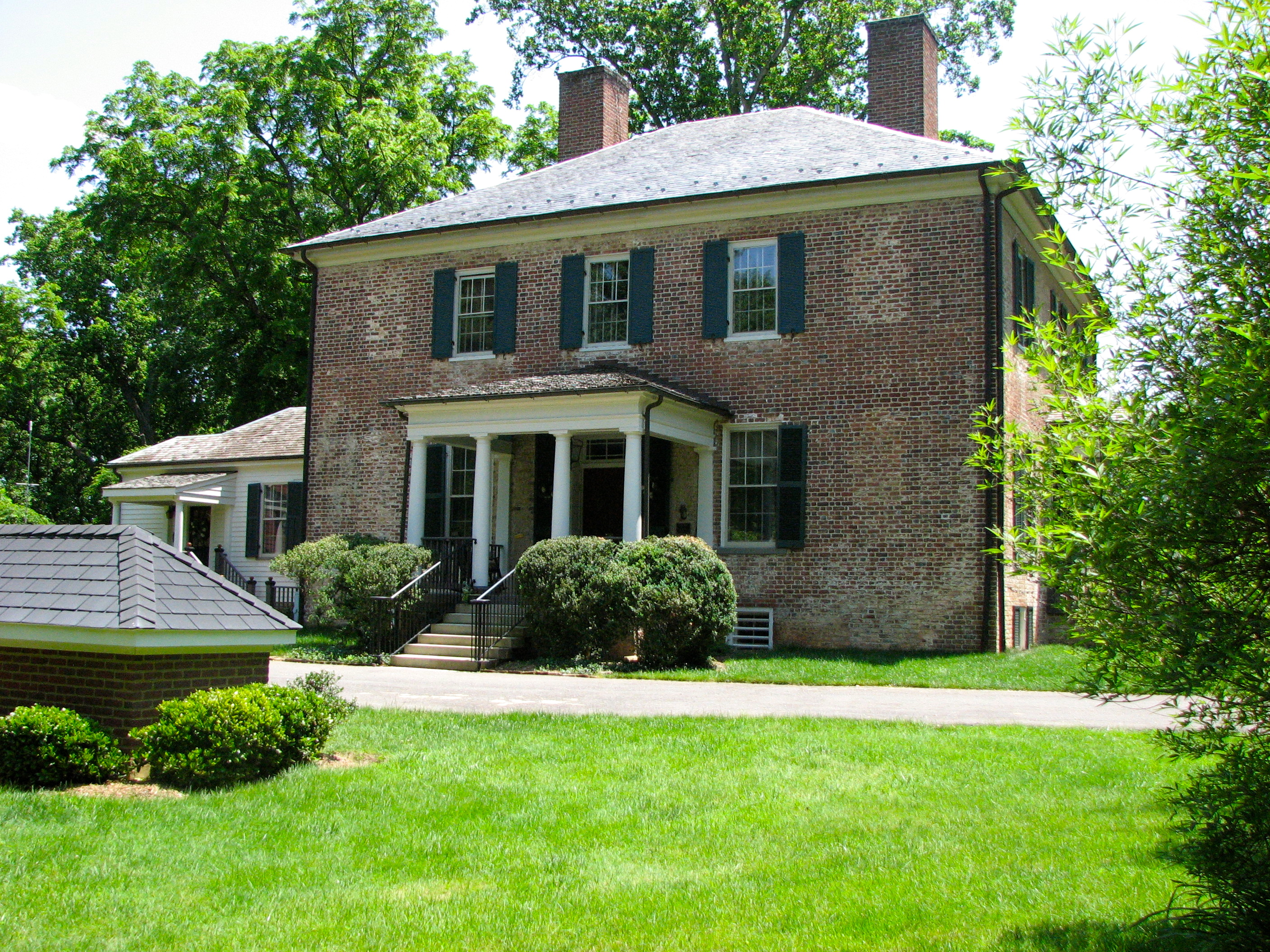
- Fall Hill

- Location within Northern Virginia Location within Virginia Location within the United States
- Nearest city: Fredericksburg, Virginia
- Coordinates: 38°19′07″N 77°29′30″W
- Area: 70 acres (28 ha)
- Built: 1790
- Architectural style: Georgian
- NRHP reference No.: 73002062
- VLR No.: 111-0149

Significant dates
- Added to NRHP: June 18, 1973
- Designated VLR: April 17, 1973

Fall Hill is a plantation located near the falls on the Rappahannock River in Fredericksburg, Virginia. Though the Thornton family has lived at Fall Hill since the early 18th century, the present house was built in 1790 for Francis Thornton V (1760–1836). The land on which Fall Hill is located is part of an 8,000 acres (3,200 ha) land patent obtained by Francis Thornton I (1657–1727) around 1720. The present-day town of Fredericksburg, Virginia is located on that original patent.

== The mansion at Fall Hill ==
The mansion at Fall Hill (pictured) is a Georgian two-story home with a central hall and two large rooms on either side. Its roof is hipped and there are interior chimneys at each end. The outside walls are randomly glazed Flemish bond brickwork. In keeping with the Georgian design of the exterior, second floor window openings are proportionately smaller than those of the first floor.

The home was remodeled around 1830 and, as a result of replacements to door and window frames, doors and sashes, the only original parts of the exterior are the walls, roof, and chimneys. During this remodeling, two windows on the front of the house were bricked over on both the first and second floors. Doric columns on the porches on the west front and south end were added in the 19th century. More recently, a larger Doric porch on the east front was removed. During renovations, Greek Revival fireplace mantels were installed in the northwest and southwest rooms. These have since been removed to expose the original segmental fireplace openings.

The grounds surrounding the house contain many old trees in a wide variety of species. There are a number of gravel walks around the 'park-like' grounds. A hillside west of the house provides a view of nearby Fredericksburg.

== History ==
The land on which Fall Hill was established is believed to have been included in a grant of 8,000 acres (3,200 ha) in Spotsylvania County patented by Francis Thornton I (1657–1727) around 1720. Thornton belonged to one of Virginia's distinguished Colonial families. Upon settling in the area, Thornton established a home at The Falls, a plantation at the foot of Fall Hill within the present-day town of Fredericksburg. The family ran a grist mill on the Rappahannock River. It is said that Francis Thornton III (1711–1749) built the house on Fall Hill in order to escape the heat of the house at The Falls laying lower in elevation near the river.

Francis Thornton III married Frances Gregory, daughter of Mildred Washington Gregory, aunt and godmother of George Washington. He served as a burgess, a trustee of Fredericksburg, and Colonel of the Spotsylvania militia. In 1749, Fall Hill was inherited by Colonel Thornton's son, Francis Thornton IV (1737–1794). However, he and his wife, Ann Thompson, maintained their primary residence at The Falls.

The present mansion at Fall Hill is believed to have been built by Francis Thornton V (1760–1836) probably around 1790 when he married Sally Innes. This belief is supported by architectural evidence in the design of the houses common to the period. Francis Thornton V was a Justice of the Peace in Spotsylvania County. Their son, James Innes Thornton, was born at Fall Hill. He moved to Alabama, became its third secretary of state, and established his own plantation, Thornhill. Francis Thornton V died in 1836 without a will. For nine years, until the estate was settled in 1845, Fall Hill was maintained by family slaves. Ultimately, the estate was deeded to Dr. John Taylor in 1845. Dr. Taylor had married Elizabeth Fitzgerald Forbes, a daughter of Sally Innes Thornton and Murray Forbes, and a granddaughter of Francis Thornton V, in February 1842. It was Dr. Taylor that renovated the home in the 1840s.

Its proximity to the Rappahannock River made Fall Hill a strategic point during the Fredericksburg Campaign of the Civil War. Fortifications were built along the river at the house to protect the crossing. The breastworks were built by General Robert E. Lee's soldiers. According to long-time resident, Butler Franklin, at one point Lee ordered the mansion destroyed by cannon fire so he could better see the approach of the Union Army across the river. However the house was saved when the Union Army's advance changed direction.

In 1870 Dr. Taylor's son, Murry Forbes Taylor, married Butler-Brayne Thornton, a cousin of his mother, and also a descendant of Francis Thornton V, which again reinforced Fall Hill as a part of the Thornton family legacy. Taylor and his wife lived with Doctor Taylor at Fall Hill from 1875 to 1877. In 1877, Murray Taylor and his wife moved to California where Taylor managed the estate of Mrs. Phoebe Apperson Hearst (mother of William Randolph Hearst) at San Simeon, California. To show her gratitude to Murray Taylor when he retired from his job at San Simeon in 1908, Mrs. Hearst purchased Fall Hill for $25,000 as a gift for him. It was Mrs. Hearst's wish that Butler-Brayne Thornton Robinson Franklin (granddaughter of Murray Forbes Taylor and Butler Brayne Thornton) inherit the estate. During the period from 1845 to 1870, when Dr. Taylor was deeded the property, it was technically still in the Thornton family, through his wife. So the property that Fall Hill was built on, had been in possession of the Thornton family, for over 280 years.

Butler Franklin, who died in 2003 at the age of 104, was the last of the Thorntons to own the property. In 2000, Fall Hill was purchased by Barry and Maureen Kefauver. Fall Hill was added to the National Register of Historic Places in June 1973.

== Notes ==
1. Fall Hill has historically been a part of Spotsylvania County, Virginia. The area on which it is located was annexed by the City of Fredericksburg, Virginia in 1983.
