= Charlotte Durante =

American woman city commissioner

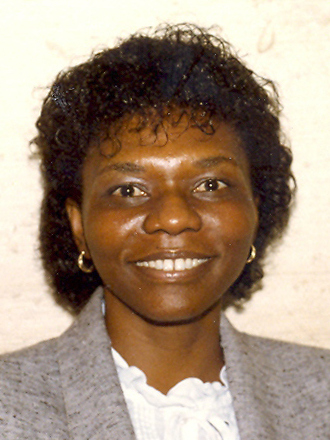
- Durante in 1986

Member of the Delray Beach City Commission
- In office 1978–1982

Personal details
- Education: Tuskegee Institute; Pennsylvania State University (MPH)

Charlotte Gilmore Durante was elected in 1978 as the first African American woman City Commissioner in Delray Beach, a city in Palm Beach County, Florida. She served until 1982. In 2010, she was arrested on charges of defrauding Haitian immigrants out of 1.8 million dollars in a Ponzi scheme, in order to purchase a permanent location for the Museum of Lifestyle & Fashion History, which her daughter ran. Convicted on a portion of the original charges in 2013, she completed her sentence in 2016.

== Early life and education ==
Durante studied at the Tuskegee Institute and later obtained a master's degree in public health from Penn State.

Prior to her political career, Durante worked as a real estate agent. In 1977, she showed a Palm Beach mansion to Dick Gregory, which led some of the city's white residents to claim blockbusting.

== Political career ==
Durante was the first chair of the South County Mental Health Center, which opened the first crisis intervention center in south Palm Beach County in 1975. After the board fired the Center's director in December 1975, he and his executive assistant claimed he had been fired for opposing Durante's conflicts of interest, including attempting to have the Center use her properties for housing. The director and assistant subsequently sued the Durante and the rest of the Center's board for reinstatement, alleging violations of the Florida Sunshine Law. The matter was investigated by the local mental health district and by the federal Department of Health, Education and Welfare.

Durante also served on the Delray Beach planning and zoning board, an appointed position.

In the March 1978 election, Durante ran as one of five candidates for three seats the Delray Beach city commission. The Miami Herald described her as a "leader of the black community". Although accused of being close to former mayor James Scheifley, who was also running, she noted that Scheifley had opposed her nomination to the zoning board. The race went to a runoff with 33.6% turnout, in which Durante defeated her opponent Willard Young by 53% to 47%. Durante thus became the only Black person and the only woman among the city commissioners.

Durante won reelection by a comfortable margin in March 1980. She led the field of City Commission candidates in fundraising.

In 1980 Durante advocated for Palm Beach County to establish a center for Haitian refugees, who were arriving in large numbers but were being denied refugee status by the United States. In 1981 Durante's work remodeling a former kindergarten in Delray Beach was opposed by neighbors who feared she would provide housing to Haitians.

Although the city commission was elected at large, Durante's seat was known as the "black seat". The name reflected the fact that the commission had always had exactly one Black member since the election of Ozie Youngblood, the first Black commissioner in the city's history, in 1968. A campaign to elect a second Black commissioner in 1979 failed.

In 1982, Durante and Scheifley were defeated by large margins, and her former opponent Willard Young became mayor. Young attributed the result to voter unhappiness with alleged mismanagement of the city government and finances. Durante attributed her loss to negative campaigning and the effect of a second Black candidate splitting the vote.

After leaving the city commission, Durante continued to advocate for city investment in Black areas of Delray Beach.

== Trial and conviction ==
On May 26, 2010, the Police Department of the City of Delray Beach arrested Durante on fraud charges carrying a sentence of up to 90 years in prison.

The presiding judge was Charles E. Burton. Durante’s attorney, Thomas Montgomery, insisted his client did nothing wrong. She planned to get donations and government grants for the museum. That money would be used to repay investors, he said."

Eve Lyon, jury forewoman, said the panel had no choice but to convict. Montgomery and Durante insisted they had evidence that would prove investors knew what they were getting into, but "[i]t was mainly lack of contrary information from the defense side" that led to the conviction, Lyon said. "(Montgomery) didn't demonstrate anything concrete."

Montgomery later sought a new trial, arguing that the judge erred by forcing him to represent Durante, and by failing to grant a trial delay because of Durante's medical condition.

On June 13, 2013, the judge sentenced Durante to seven years, with three years credit for time served. The judge noted that Durante had been "a beacon for the community" and had lived a "remarkable life".

Near the end of her sentence in 2016, Durante filed an appeal for a new trial. The Florida Fourth District Court of Appeal, however, summarily affirmed the trial court.
