= Rosemount (Forkland, Alabama) =

Historic house in Alabama, United States

- U.S. National Register of Historic Places
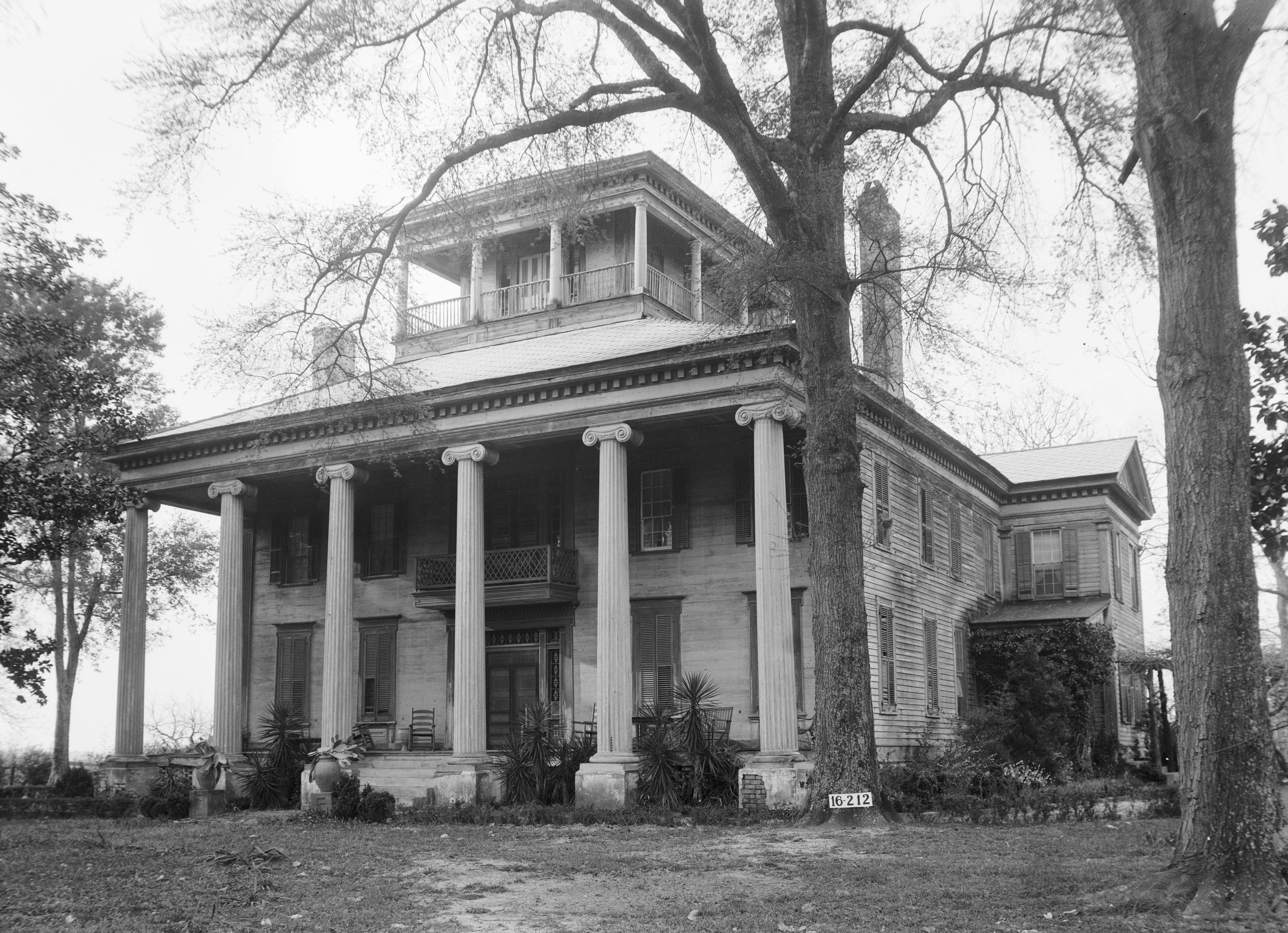
- The front (south) elevation of Rosemount in 1934

- Location within Alabama Location within the United States
- Nearest city: Forkland, Alabama
- Coordinates: 32°40′16″N 87°54′28″W
- Built: 1832-55
- Architect: Allen Glover
- Architectural style: Greek Revival
- NRHP reference No.: 71000099
- Added to NRHP: May 27, 1971

Rosemount is a historic plantation house near Forkland, Alabama, United States. The Greek Revival style house was built in stages between 1832 and the 1850s by the Glover family. The house has been called the "Grand Mansion of Alabama." The property was added to the National Register of Historic Places on May 27, 1971. The Glover family enslaved over 300 people from 1830 until 1860.

== History ==
Allen Glover, of Demopolis, gave the 3,000-acre (1,200 ha) property to his son, Williamson Allen Glover, in the early 1830s. The main block of the house, designed in 1832 by state architect, William Nichols, is centered on a prominent star-shaped hill. This main block, with three floors and a mezzanine, was built in 1835. Williamson Allen Glover continued to expand the rear and interior of the house, through successive additions and reconfigurations, up to 1855. He went on to raise a total of sixteen children in the mansion's twenty rooms.

== Architecture ==
The exterior of the house features a Carolina-type monumental two-story Ionic portico, east and west side porches, and a continuous cornice with dentils above the second story and the cupola. The house plan forms a T-shape, to take advantage of the cross-ventilation that this plan affords. The major interior rooms include an entrance hall, twin parlors, great halls on both main floors that are 60 feet (18 m) long, a dining room, eight bedrooms, and a rooftop cupola, the largest residential example in Alabama. The cupola houses a music room that measures 16 feet (4.9 m) by 25 feet (7.6 m); double doors exit the south side of the music room onto a three sided porch with Doric columns. The cupola functioned as a look-out over the plantation and, along with the great halls, as a way to exhaust heated air out of the house during hot weather. Though no longer extant, the grounds once included formal gardens, a carriage house, a two-story servant's quarters, a schoolhouse, several barns, a corn crib, a shop, five slave cabins behind the main house, and a "slave village" about one mile away. Additionally there was a detached kitchen, now destroyed, that was later moved and attached to the house.

The house passed through different families over the years, going through some periods of disrepair and later, restorations. A massive restoration was begun around 2005 and the exterior was completely finished.

== See also ==
- Glover Mausoleum, built for Williamson Glover's father and also listed on the NRHP
