= Whitfield family of the United States =

American political family

Whitfield
- Current region: United States
- Etymology: Hoit-Feldt, Norse for "white field"
- Origin: United Kingdom
- Members: William Whitfield I William Whitfield II; William Whitfield III; Henry L. Whitfield; James B. Whitfield; James Whitfield; Nathan Bryan Whitfield
- Connected families: Herring family, Bryan family, Wooten family
- Distinctions: Planters (American gentry)

The Whitfield family was a prominent American political family of the Southern states. The Whitfields formed the American branch of the British Whitfield family - having descended from the British aristocracy, particularly the Earls of Kilmorey and having established colonial residency under Sir. Thomas Whitfield, who headed East India Trading for the British Empire. In early days of Colonial America, the family emigrated to Virginia in the seventeenth century, particularly, Nansemond County, Virginia from Lancashire, England.

The family produced many United States Congressmen, Senators and Governors, as well as businessmen and military generals active from the American Revolutionary War and past the American Civil War, with significance during the antebellum period. The family is most connected to the U.S. State of North Carolina, but had extended land ownership, slave trade, business activities and public service to Louisiana, Alabama, Kentucky, Mississippi and Florida.

== Background ==
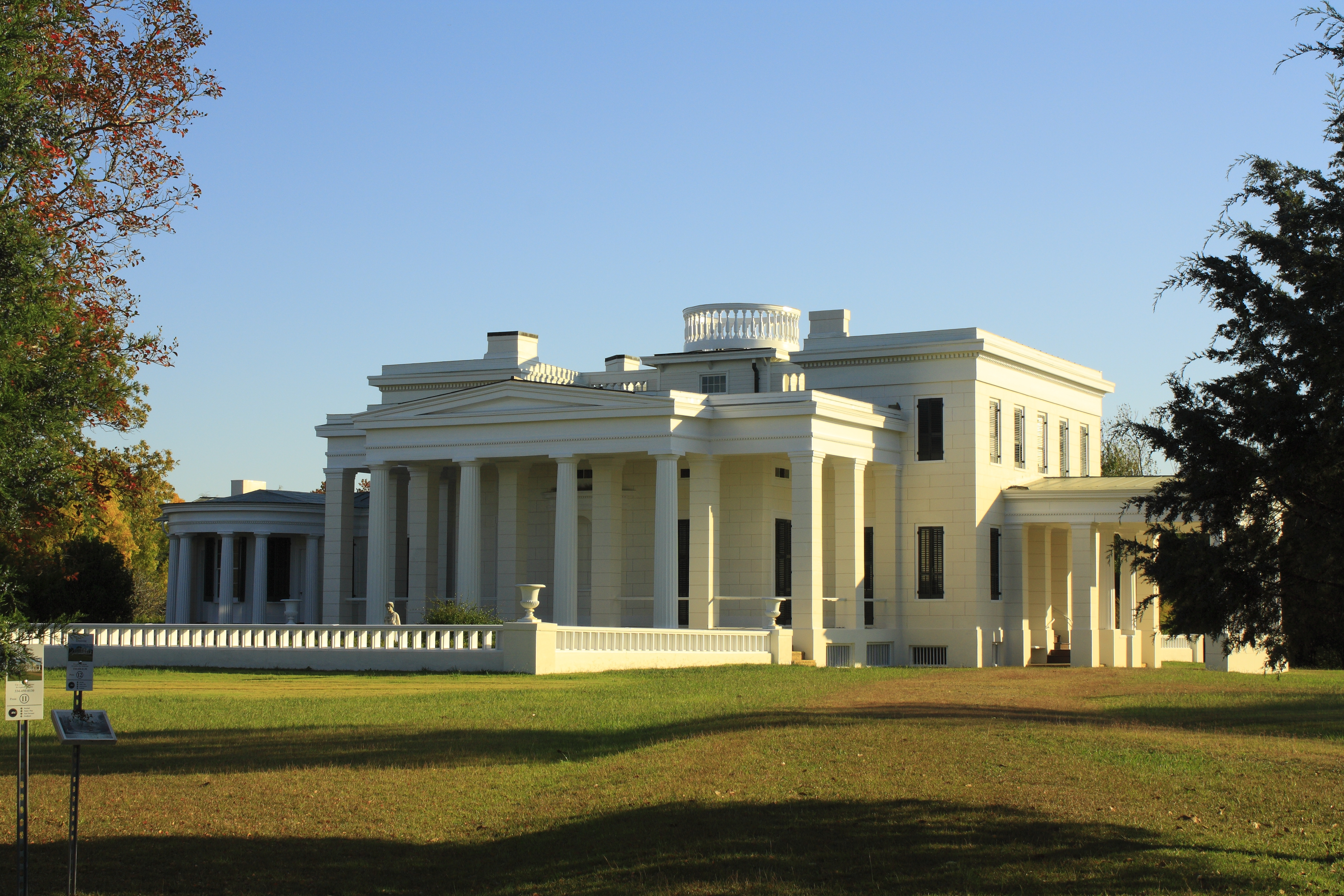
The Gaineswood plantation home.

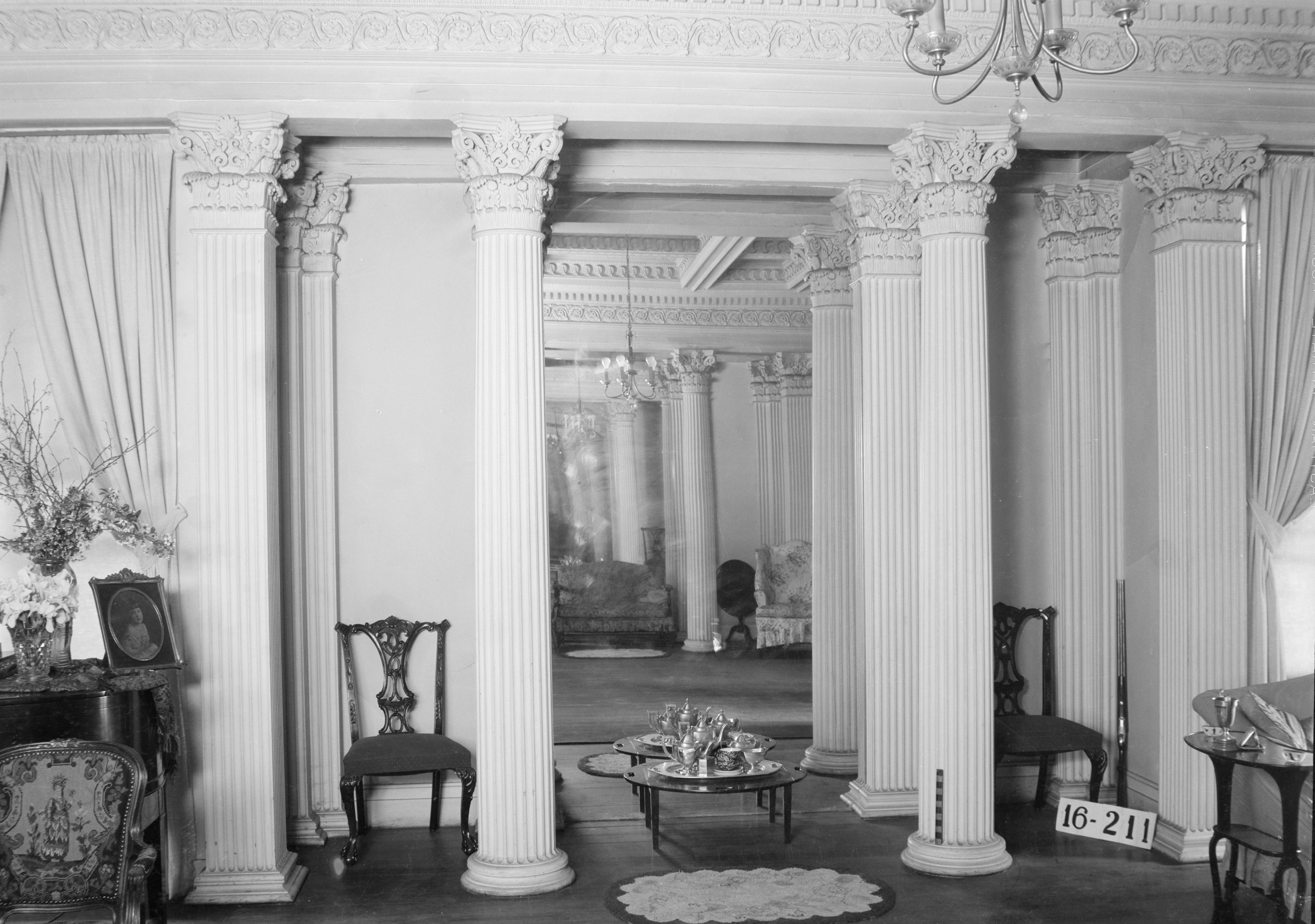
Ballroom at Gaineswood.

Born in Lancashire, England, patriarch William Whitfield I moved to Nansemond County, Virginia. In 1770, Whitfield, along with his wife, were killed by the Tuscarora Indians. His son, William Whitfield II purchased Seven Springs, North Carolina from Buckskin Williams, the father of Benjamin Williams, the Governor of North Carolina. During the American Revolutionary War, he served as a captain of the 6th Virginia Regiment, along with his sons, Needham Whitfield and William Whitfield III who were in the Battle of Moore's Creek Bridge during the revolutionary war. The former was a clerk to Colonel Richard Caswell and the other a private in the Light Horse Cavalry, taking prisoner General McDonald, who was the Commander of the Tories.

Whitfield II was a Dobbs County member to the 1761 and 1762 North Carolina General Assembly held in Wilmington. In 1779 he was a member of Governor Richard Caswell's Council held in New Berne, and a Justice of Peace for Johnston County, North Carolina. He was later a colonel. Whitfield III in turn, was also appointed Justice of the Peace for Dobbs County in 1778. Along with his son, he was a Director and Trustee for designing and building the town of Wanesboro. He had 29 children and forty of his descendants served in the confederate army during the American Civil war.

This included, Nathan Bryan Whitfield, William III's nephew, who became the Counselor of State for the State of North Carolina and was a State Senator. He was later commissioned to Major General rank to succeed his father for the militia. His son, Dr. Bryan Watkins Whitfield, was pardoned by U.S. President Andrew Johnson on September 12, 1865. Gaineswood, which still stands today, was the most significant remaining examples of Greek Revival architecture in Alabama. was designed and built by Whitfield, beginning in 1843 as an open-hall log dwelling. Whitfield is known to have designed most of the house from pattern books by James Stuart, Minard Lafever, Nicholas Revett and others. Much of the work on the house was executed by highly skilled artisan slaves. Whitfield moved from North Carolina to Marengo County, Alabama in 1834. In 1842 Whitfield bought the 480-acre (1.9 km^{2}) property from George Strother Gaines, younger brother of Edmund P. Gaines.

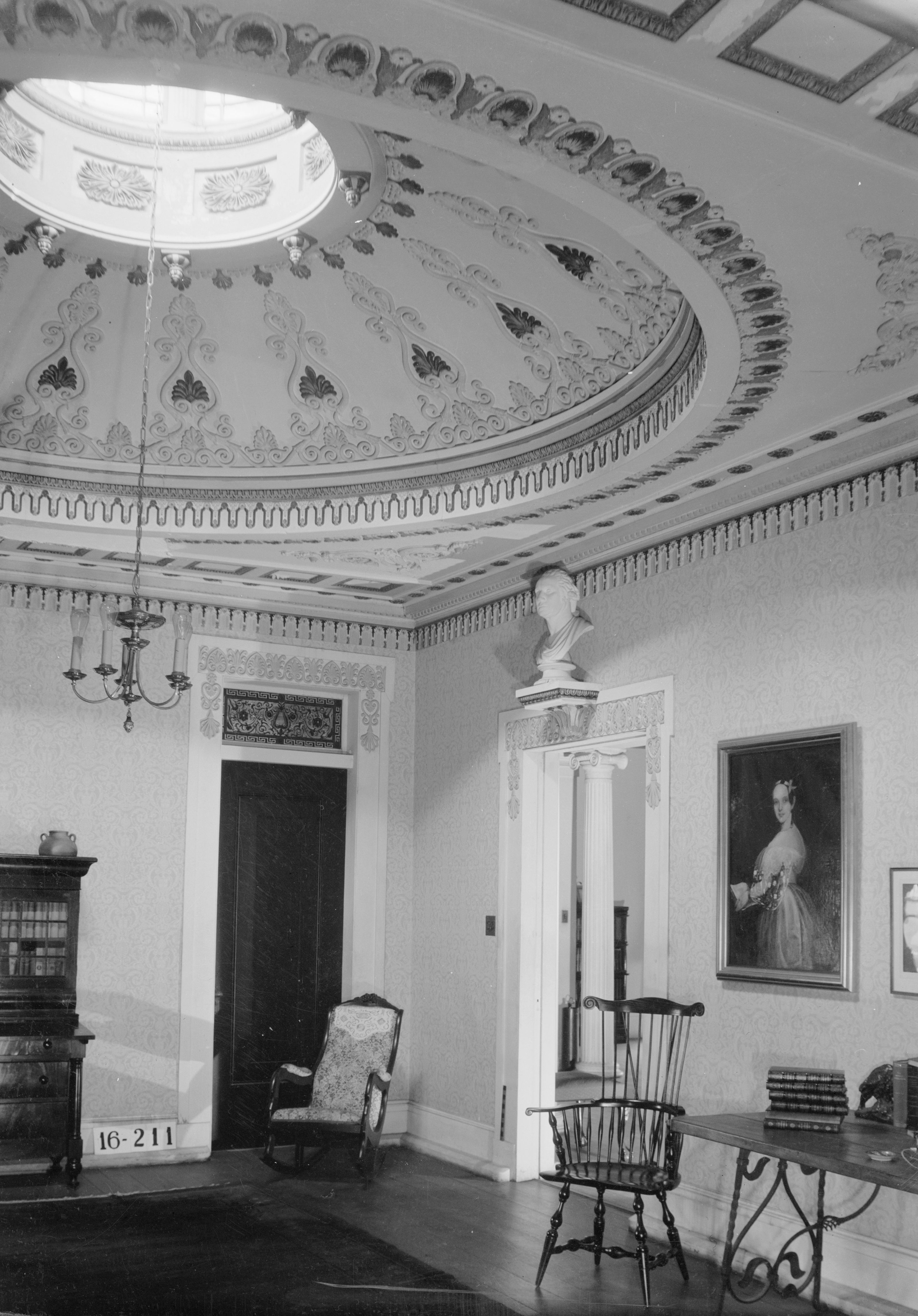
The library inside the Gaineswood residence.

Much of the work on the house was executed by highly skilled artisan slaves. The grounds had been the site of a notable historic event while owned by George Gaines. When Gaines was serving as the US Indian Agent, he is said to have met with the famous chief Pushmataha, of the Choctaw Nation, under an old post oak tree on what would become the Gaineswood estate. They were negotiating the terms of the treaty that would lead to the Choctaw removal to Indian Territory. The tree became known as the Pushmataha Oak.

Whitfield first named the estate Marlmont in 1843; he renamed it Gaineswood in 1856 in honor of Gaines. The Whitfield family tradition maintained that Gaines' original log house was the nucleus around which Whitfield had the mansion built, and that it was located at the present site of the south entrance hall and office. Gen. Whitfield sold the house to his son, Dr. Bryan Watkins Whitfield, in 1861. The second generation of Whitfields maintained Gaineswood as a residence. Mary Foscue Whitfield inherited the nearby Foscue-Whitfield House in 1861 upon her father's death and used that as a residence as well. For later descendants, post Civil War, the lands and plantations were sold.

The family established the Henry Whitfield House in 1639 in the town of Guilford, Connecticut. Historically, it is Connecticut's oldest house. The house, with its massive stone walls, also served as a fort to protect the community Henry Whitfield, for whom the house was built, was a Puritan minister who had come from England to flee religious persecution The house was remodeled in 1868 and opened to the public in 1899 as the first museum of the State of Connecticut, the Henry Whitfield State Museum. The house was restored in 1902–04 and in the 1930s and was declared a National Historic Landmark in 1997. It was named a State Archaeological Preserve in 2006.

== Members ==
- William Whitfield II (1715-1795) — Member of the North Carolina General Assembly from Dobbs County (1761 - 1762). In 1779 he was a member of Governor Richard Caswell's Council, and a Justice of Peace for Johnston County, North Carolina. Captain of the 6th Virginia Regiment during the American Revolutionary War.
  - William Whitfield III (1743-1817) — Fought in the Battle of Moore's Creek Bridge during the American Revolutionary War. Appointed Justice of the peace for Dobbs County in 1778.
  - Benjamin Bryan Whitfield (1754-1817) — Member of North Carolina General Assembly representing from Dobbs County, 1786–87. Served in the Continental Army during the Revolutionary War as a General.
    - Nathan Bryan Whitfield (1799-1868) — Member of North Carolina General Assembly from Lenoir County, 1821; Member of North Carolina Senate from Lenoir County, 1822–23, 1825, 1827. General of the North Carolina militia during the war.

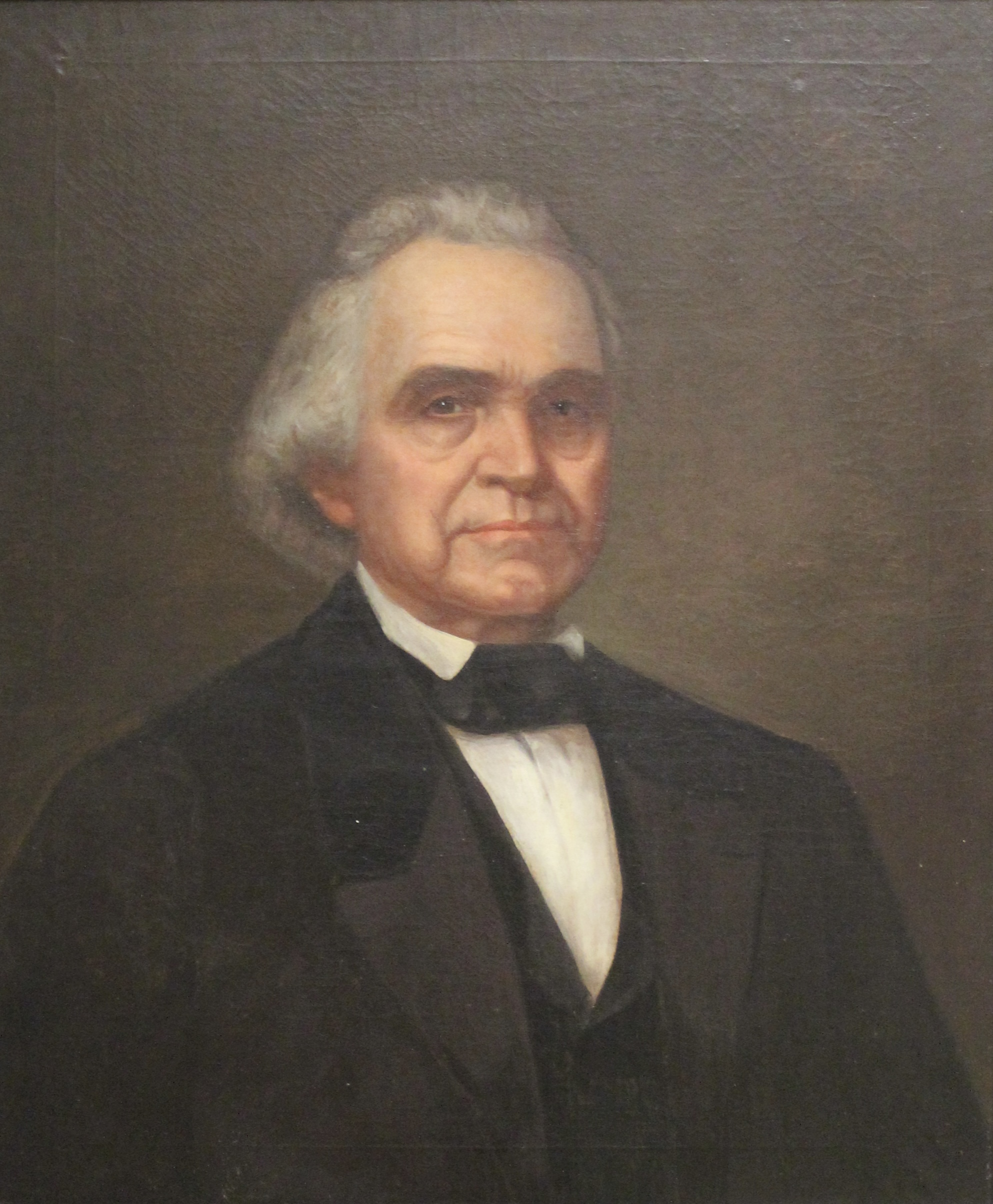
Governor James Whitfield

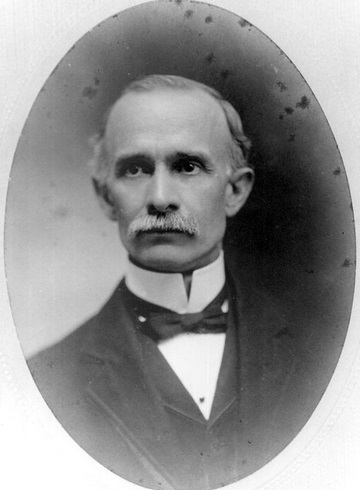
Justice James B. Whitfield

    - James Bryan Whitfield (1809-1841) — Member of North Carolina Senate of the 17th District, 1840–41.
      - Nathan Bryan Whitfield (1835-1914) — Member of North Carolina House of Representatives from Lenoir County, North Carolina (1858–59, 1891–92). Colonel in the Union Army during the American Civil War.
        - James B. Whitfield (1860-1948) — 11th State Treasurer of Florida (1897-1903), 17th Attorney General of Florida (1903-1904), and Chief Justice of the Supreme Court of Florida. Grandfather of Dr. Randolph Whitfield, Jr, brother-in-law of astronaut Rusty Schweickart.

=== Others ===
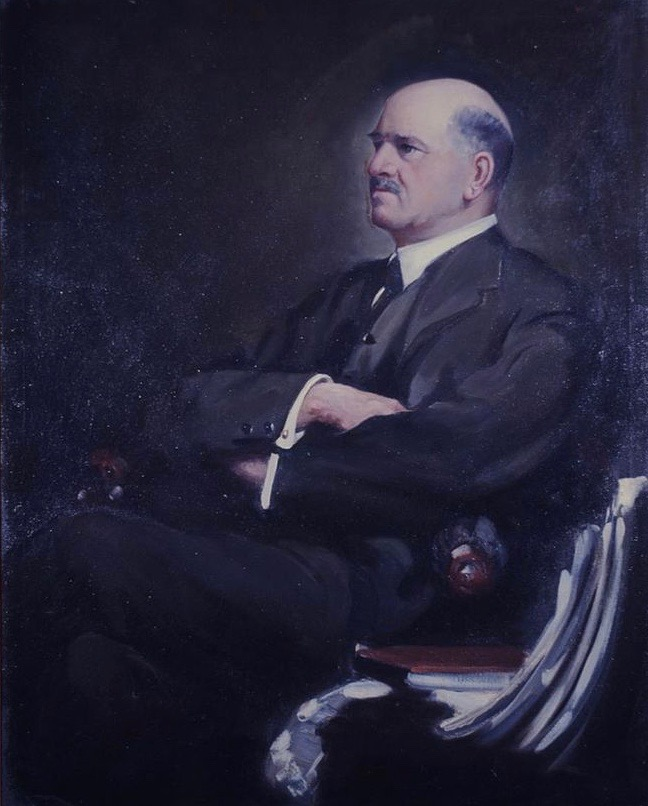
Governor Henry L. Whitfield

- James Whitfield (1791-1875) — 18th Governor of Mississippi, 1851–52. Member of Mississippi State House of Representatives, 1842–50, 1858–62; member of Mississippi State Senate, 1851. Grandnephew of William Whitfield II.
  - Henry L. Whitfield (1868 -1927) — 41st Governor of Mississippi, Delegate to the 1924 Democratic National Convention from Mississippi. Great-great-great grandson of William Whitfield II.
- Needham Bryan (1749-1787) — Member of North Carolina Senate from Johnston County, 1777–79; member of North Carolina General Assembly from Johnston County, 1786. First cousin of Benjamin Bryan Whitfield.
  - Lovard Bryan (1769-1798) — Member of North Carolina General Assembly from Johnston County, 1791–92.
  - David Hardy Bryan (1753-1820) — Member of North Carolina General Assembly from Johnston County, 1781, 1785, 1790; member of North Carolina Senate from Johnston County, 1783, 1792–93. First cousin once removed of Nathan Bryan Whitfield (1799-1868).
  - Joseph Hunter Bryan (1782-1839) — Member of North Carolina General Assembly, 1804–05, 1807–09; U.S. Representative from North Carolina, (Republican, 2nd District) at the fourteenth and fifteenth Congress, 1815–19. Third cousin of David Hardy Bryan.
    - Henry Hunter Bryan (1786-1835) — U.S. Representative from Tennessee (Republican), (at-large) at the sixteenth Congress, 1819–21. Third cousin of David Hardy Bryan.
      - Auburn Bascomb Bryan (1873-1942) — Alternate delegate of North Carolina to the 1924 Republican National Convention. Second great-grandnephew of David Hardy Bryan.

== See also ==
- Henry Whitfield House
- The House Place Plantation
- Bryan Whitfield Herring Farm
- Needham Whitfield Herring House
- Foscue-Whitfield House
- Gaineswood Plantation House
- Welaunee Plantation, Florida
