= Nathan Bryan Whitfield =

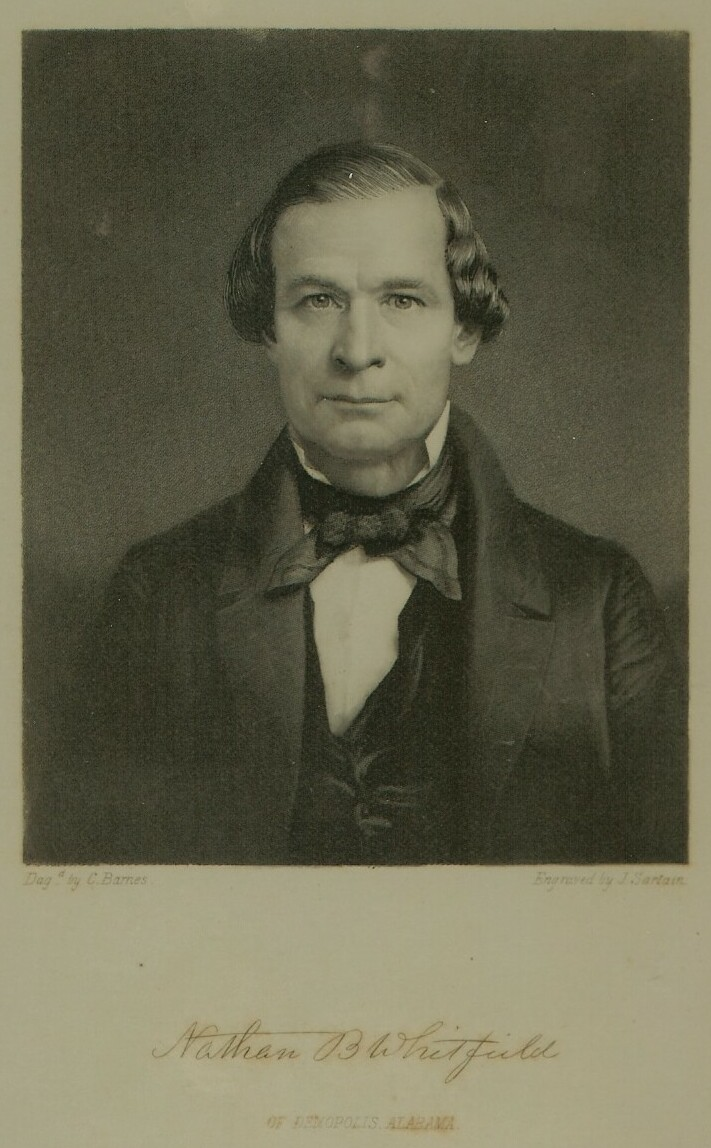
- Born: September 19, 1799; Lenoir County, North Carolina, US
- Died: December 27, 1868 (aged 69); Marengo County, Alabama, US
- Military career
- Allegiance: United States
- Branch: North Carolina militia
- Rank: Major General

Nathan Bryan Whitfield (19 September 1799 in Lenoir County, North Carolina – 27 December 1868 in Demopolis, Alabama) was a planter, architect and General of the North Carolina Militia.

== Background ==
Born on the Whitfield family owned Pleasant Plains plantation (built by his grandfather William Whitfield II), to General Bryan Whitfield, he attended school at the age of nine under a tutor and entered the University at age 12. At 17, he completed coursework at the University. Two years later, he became the Counselor of State for the State of North Carolina and was a State Senator. He was later commissioned to Major General rank to succeed his father. In 1789 he was one of the founders of the University of North Carolina and one of its first Trustees.

Gaineswood, the grandest plantation house ever built in Marengo County and one of the most significant remaining examples of Greek Revival architecture in Alabama. was designed and built by Whitfield, beginning in 1843 as an open-hall log dwelling. Whitfield is known to have designed most of the house from pattern books by James Stuart, Minard Lafever, Nicholas Revett and others. Much of the work on the house was executed by highly skilled artisan slaves. Whitfield moved from North Carolina to Marengo County, Alabama in 1834. In 1842 Whitfield bought the 480-acre (1.9 km^{2}) property from George Strother Gaines, younger brother of Edmund P. Gaines.

The grounds had been the site of a notable historic event while owned by George Gaines. When Gaines was serving as the US Indian Agent, he is said to have met with the famous chief Pushmataha, of the Choctaw Nation, under an old post oak tree on what would become the Gaineswood estate. They were negotiating the terms of the treaty that would lead to the Choctaw removal to Indian Territory. The tree became known as the Pushmataha Oak.

Whitfield first named the estate Marlmont in 1843, he renamed it Gaineswood in 1856 in honor of Gaines. The Whitfield family tradition maintained that Gaines' original log house was the nucleus around which Whitfield had the mansion built, and that it was located at the present site of the south entrance hall and office. Gen. Whitfield sold the house to his son, Dr. Bryan Watkins Whitfield, in 1861. The second generation of Whitfields maintained Gaineswood as a residence. Mary Foscue Whitfield inherited the nearby Foscue-Whitfield House in 1861 upon her father's death and used that as a residence as well.
