= William Whitfield =

William Whitfield may refer to:

- William Whitfield II (1715–1795), American Revolutionary War officer and planter
- William Whitfield III (1743–1817), American Revolutionary War soldier and slave owner
- William H. Whitfield (1804–1886), American sea captain and member of the Massachusetts House of Representatives
- Billy Whitfield (1905–1971), English footballer, see List of Bury F.C. players
- Sir William Whitfield (architect) (1920–2019), British architect & town planner
