= Samuel Small =

American Baptist minister (1826–1883)

Samuel Small (1826 or 1827 – October 30, 1883) was a Baptist minister and state legislator who lived in Ocala, Florida. He was one of several African Americans who served in the Florida House of Representatives representing Marion County, Florida and Ocala during the Reconstruction era. The era was a hotbed of secessionist ferment before the American Civil War.

He was born in South Carolina and brought to Florida as a boy. Soon after emancipation he became pastor of Mount Moriah Baptist Church. He served as Marion County Voter Registrar in 1867 and 1868, and a county commissioner from 1868 to c. 1872.

Eric Foner documented him as a literate farmer who was born in 1826 or 1827 and came to Florida before the Civil War. He represented Marion County in the state house in 1874 and 1875. He is buried at Evergreen Cemetery in Ocala.

He was enslaved on the Osceola Plantation. It was a former Spanish land grant later owned by John M. Taylor. Taylor's son R. Fenwick Taylor served on the Florida Supreme Court for 35 years, 18 of them as chief justice.
