= W. H. Ellis =

American judge and politician (1867–1948)

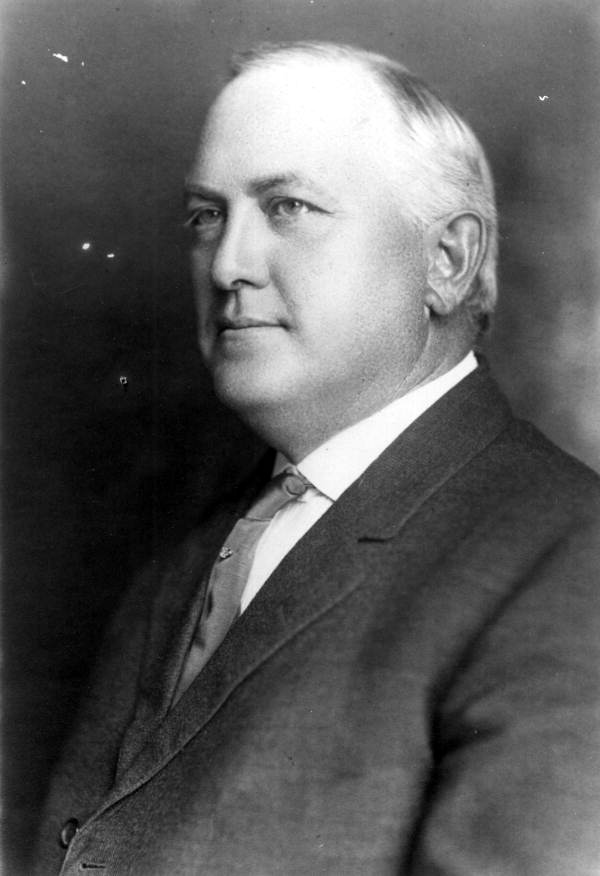

18th Chief Justice of Florida
- In office January 1937 – November 1, 1938
- Preceded by: James B. Whitfield
- Succeeded by: William Glenn Terrell
- In office January 11, 1927 – January 8, 1929
- Preceded by: Armstead Brown
- Succeeded by: William Glenn Terrell

President of the Florida Bar
- In office 1919–1920
- Preceded by: William Hunter
- Succeeded by: O. K. Reaves

Justice of the Supreme Court of Florida
- In office January 5, 1915 – November 1, 1938
- Appointed by: Park Trammell
- Preceded by: William A. Hocker
- Succeeded by: Elwyn Thomas

18th Florida Attorney General
- In office February 15, 1904 – January 5, 1909
- Governor: William Sherman Jennings; Napoleon B. Broward
- Preceded by: James B. Whitfield
- Succeeded by: Park Trammell

1st Florida State Auditor
- In office February 1903 – February 15, 1904
- Governor: William Sherman Jennings
- Preceded by: William V. Knott (as Expert Accountant)
- Succeeded by: Ernest Amos

Personal details
- Born: September 17, 1867 Pensacola, Florida, U.S.
- Died: April 14, 1948 (aged 80) Jacksonville, Florida, U.S.
- Party: Democratic
- Spouse: Minnie Ramelle Nicholson (m. 1894; died 1902) Serena Taylor (m. 1906–1948)
- Children: 4
- Education: Stetson University (J.D.)
- Occupation: Attorney

William Hull Ellis (September 17, 1867 – April 14, 1948), more commonly referred to as William H. Ellis and W. H. Ellis, was an American attorney and politician from the state of Florida. Ellis served twice as the Chief Justice of the Supreme Court of Florida.

== Early life and education ==
Ellis was born in Pensacola, Florida, on September 17, 1867, though he grew up in Quincy, Florida. After attending a business college in Atlanta, Georgia, Ellis attended Stetson University, graduating with his Juris Doctor in 1889. He was admitted to the Florida Bar in the same year. He began a private law practice in Quincy.

Ellis was one of Florida's delegates at the 1900 Democratic National Convention.

== Political career ==
=== Early career ===
In February 1903, Ellis helped reorganize Florida's Office of the Expert Accountant into the Office of the Florida State Auditor. In return, Florida Governor William Sherman Jennings appointed him as to the position. Ellis served as the state's auditor until February 15, 1904, when he was appointed as the 18th Florida Attorney General by Jennings, finishing the term of James B. Whitfield, who had been appointed to the Supreme Court of Florida.

Ellis was elected to his first full term later in 1904. While serving as attorney general, Ellis, a Progressive, contributed in the reorganization of the Florida Bar, transforming the organization from a simple benefit society to an active group of lawyers, publishing a legal journal and drafting court procedures.

Ellis did not seek reelection in 1908, opting instead to return to private practice. From 1911 until 1915, he served as the general counsel of Florida's Internal Improvement Fund.

=== Supreme Court of Florida ===
On January 5, 1915, Governor Park Trammell appointed Ellis to the Supreme Court of Florida. Ellis served a long and distinguished career on the court, with his dissenting opinion for State v. Daniel (1924) foreshadowing what would become gender equality, writing:

Eligibility to office does not rest upon considerations of sex, nor does woman’s qualifications for public service rest upon any assumed spiritual endowments, or beauty of soul, nor peculiar faculty for discerning the distinctions, with clearer perception between right and wrong than her male compatriot.

While on the court, Ellis served as the President of the Florida Bar from 1919 until 1920. In 1926, the Florida Constitution was amended to allow the justices to elect their own chief justice. In January 1927, Ellis became the first chief justice elected in this way, "because he was the member with the most seniority who had not yet served in that capacity". He served as the court's Chief Justice twice, from 1927 until 1929 and from 1937 until he retired from the court due to illness on November 1, 1938.

In 1935, Ellis delivered a speech titled The Spirit of Americanism to the Civitan Club of Jacksonville, Florida. Since the speech occurred on Confederate Memorial Day, Ellis invoked references to Robert E. Lee to stoke the flames against what he saw was the overreach of the federal government during the Great Depression, breaking with the progressive views of President Franklin D. Roosevelt in favor of the ideals of states rights, which would eventually turn into the Dixiecrat Party.

== Death and legacy ==
Ellis died on April 14, 1948, in Jacksonville.

In January 2018, Ellis' granddaughter, Martha Ellis Holcomb, and her daughter Catherine Berry, donated many of his possessions to the Florida Supreme Court Historical Society, including his 100-page personal memoir.

== Personal life ==
In 1894, Ellis married Minnie Ramelle Nicholson. They were married until her death in childbirth for their second son, Melville Hull, in 1902. In 1906, Ellis married Serena Taylor, the daughter of Florida Supreme Court Justice R. Fenwick Taylor. They had two children, twin daughters Julia Taylor and Amelia Fenwick, and were married until Ellis' death.

Ellis was a member of the Freemasons and the Knights of Pythias, as well as Pi Gamma Mu and Phi Alpha Delta.
