= Evergreen Cemetery (Ocala, Florida) =

Historic site in Marion County, Florida, US

Coordinates: 29°11′37″N 82°08′20″W

- Interactive map of Evergreen Cemetery

Details
- Established: July 8, 1850
- Location: Ocala, Florida

Evergreen Cemetery is a historic cemetery in Ocala, Marion County, Florida. Established July 8, 1850, it was Ocala's first public cemetery. A historical marker was placed at the site. Volunteer cleanup efforts have taken place.

== Burials ==
- Robert Bullock, Confederate Army brigadier general, teacher, lawyer, judge, public official, state representative, and U.S. Representative
- Samuel Harrison Coleman, A.M.E clergyman who died in a railway accident
- John Franklin Dunn, for whom Dunnellon, Florida, is named
- James Byeram Owens, delegate to the Florida secession convention and Confederate Provisional Congress
- Samuel Small, clergyman and state representative during the Reconstruction era
- Benjamin Waldo, doctor for whom Waldo, Florida, is named
- Ebenezer Harris, owner of the Ocala House Hotel and founder of Citra
- Ocala's first mayor
