= Randolph Whitfield Jr. =

- Education: University of Virginia
- Medical career
- Profession: Doctor
- Field: Ophthalmology

Randolph Whitfield Jr. (born 1938) is an American ophthalmologist. During his career, he conducted pioneering surveys that traced the spread of blindness in deprived areas in Sub-Saharan Africa.

== Life ==
He received his medical and graduate degrees from University of Virginia in 1965 under a dual program. He received his undergraduate degree from Princeton University.

At Nyeri Provincial Hospital near Mount Kenya, he trained paramedics and clinical officers to combat eye diseases such as glaucoma and trachoma.

He is the son of Randolph and Shirley Whitfield. He married Suzanne Sellars of Atlanta, Georgia and has two children: Eston Whitfield and Louisa Rendall. Both live and work in Kenya. Whitfield's paternal grandfather, James B. Whitfield, was a state public servant in Florida for over 60 years, including a stint as a Justice of the Florida Supreme Court from 1904 to 1943.

Whitfield's cousin, Talbot "Sandy" D'Alemberte, was president of Florida State University, president of the ABA (American Bar Association) in 1991–1992, and started CEELI- http://apps.americanbar.org/rol/europe_and_eurasia/- which has been successful at converting communist and socialist countries into democracies through the development of judicial systems and access to courts.

== Awards ==
- 1982 MacArthur Fellows Program

== Works ==
- "Ophthalmology in Kenya", Arch Ophthalmol. 1987;105(10):1438-1441
- Deborah Locatcher-Khorazo; Beatrice Carrier Seegal, eds. (1972). "Ocular syphilis". Microbiology of the eye. Mosby. ISBN 978-0-8016-3024-8.
