= James B. Whitfield =

American judge

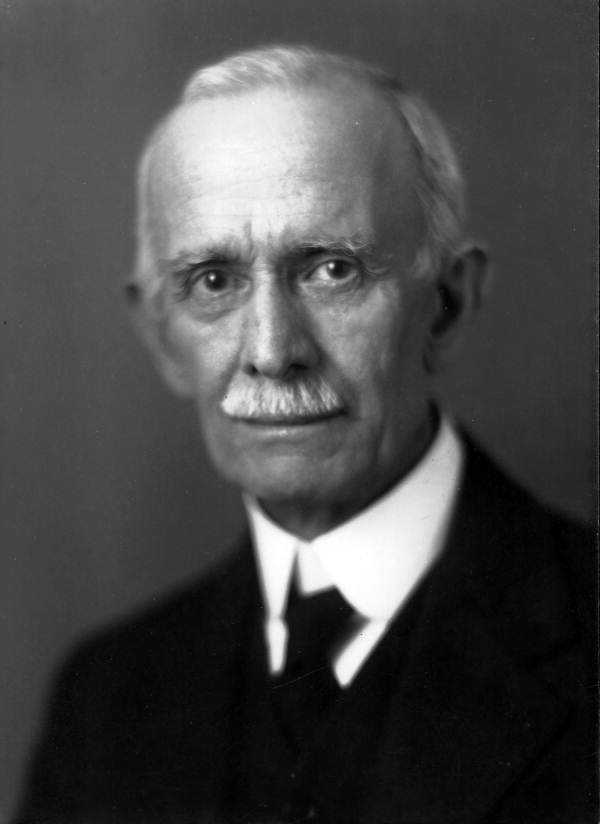

Justice of the Supreme Court of Florida
- In office February 15, 1904 – January 4, 1943
- Appointed by: William Sherman Jennings
- Preceded by: Evelyn C. Maxwell
- Succeeded by: Harold L. Sebring

13th Chief Justice of Florida
- In office January 8, 1935 – January 1937
- Preceded by: Fred H. Davis
- Succeeded by: W. H. Ellis
- In office January 6, 1909 – January 1913
- Preceded by: Thomas M. Shackleford
- Succeeded by: Thomas M. Shackleford
- In office January 10, 1905 – June 12, 1905
- Preceded by: R. Fenwick Taylor
- Succeeded by: Thomas M. Shackleford

17th Florida Attorney General
- In office March 4, 1903 – February 15, 1904
- Governor: William Sherman Jennings
- Preceded by: William Bailey Lamar
- Succeeded by: W. H. Ellis

12th Florida State Treasurer
- In office June 19, 1897 – March 4, 1903
- Governor: William D. Bloxham; William Sherman Jennings
- Preceded by: Clarence B. Collins
- Succeeded by: William V. Knott

14th Clerk of the Florida Supreme Court
- In office 1889 – June 19, 1897
- Preceded by: David C. Wilson
- Succeeded by: Bartow B. Wilson

Personal details
- Born: November 8, 1860 Wayne County, North Carolina, U.S.
- Died: August 20, 1948 (aged 87) Tallahassee, Florida, U.S.
- Party: Democratic
- Spouses: Leila Nash (m. 1886; died 1897) Margaret Howard Randolph (m. 1901)
- Children: 3
- Education: West Florida Seminary; University of Virginia (LL.B)
- Occupation: Attorney

James Bryan Whitfield (November 8, 1860 – August 20, 1948) was an American attorney and politician who served as a long-time justice of the Florida Supreme Court.

== Early life and education ==
Whitfield was born on November 8, 1860, on his father's plantation in Wayne County, North Carolina. He was a member of the Whitfield family, a prominent planter family in the American South. In 1863, Whitfield and his father moved to their plantation in Leon County, Florida.

Whitfield later moved to the nearby city of Tallahassee, Florida, where he studied law at the West Florida Seminary, later attending the University of Virginia receiving his Bachelor of Laws degree in 1886. He was admitted into the Florida Bar later that year.

== Political career ==
In 1888, Whitfield, a bank teller at the time, became the personal secretary of Florida Governor Edward A. Perry. The following year, he was appointed Clerk of the Florida Supreme Court. Whitfield, a Democrat, served in this position until June 19, 1897, when he was appointed Florida State Treasurer, succeeding Clarence B. Collins, who had resigned following his impeachment in the Florida House of Representatives for mismanaging state funds.

Whitfield served as State Treasurer until March 1903, when he was appointed Florida Attorney General following the election of the incumbent, William Bailey Lamar, to the U.S. House of Representatives.

=== Florida Supreme Court ===
In February 1904, Whitfield was appointed to the Florida Supreme Court by Governor William Sherman Jennings. Whitfield served on the court until his retirement on January 4, 1943, making him the second-longest serving Florida Supreme Court justice, only behind William Glenn Terrell. Additionally, Whitfield was elected Chief Justice by the court three times, serving in that role from January 1905 until June 1905, 1909 until 1913, and 1935 until 1937.

Whitfield's tenure on the court was marked by a period of great uncertainty regarding the rights of African Americans in Florida. Whitfield himself did not have an opinion on the topic as a whole, rather regarding it on a case-by-case basis, often leading to conflicting opinions. For example, Whitfield wrote the majority opinion for Montgomery v. State (1908), in which he wrote that it is unlawful to exclude black jurors from trials. On the other hand, however, he reaffirmed racial segregation in Florida East Coast Ry. Co. v. Geiger (1913), which upheld separate but equal, and Parramore v. State (1921), which upheld a ban on mixed-race marriages.

Whitfield retired from the court on January 4, 1943, due to declining health.

== Personal life ==
Whitfield married Leila Nash on November 25, 1886. Nash died from complications following the birth of their first child, John Nash, in 1897. Whitfield later married Margaret Hayward Randolph on June 12, 1901. They had five children together.

== Death and legacy ==
Whitfield died on August 20, 1948, at his home in Tallahassee, Florida.

In 1945, Whitfield received an honorary Doctor of Laws degree from the University of Florida. The University of Florida also has a scholarship in his memory, the Judge James Bryan Whitfield Constitutional Law Scholarship.
