= Gaineswood =

Historic house in Alabama, United States

- U.S. National Register of Historic Places
- U.S. National Historic Landmark
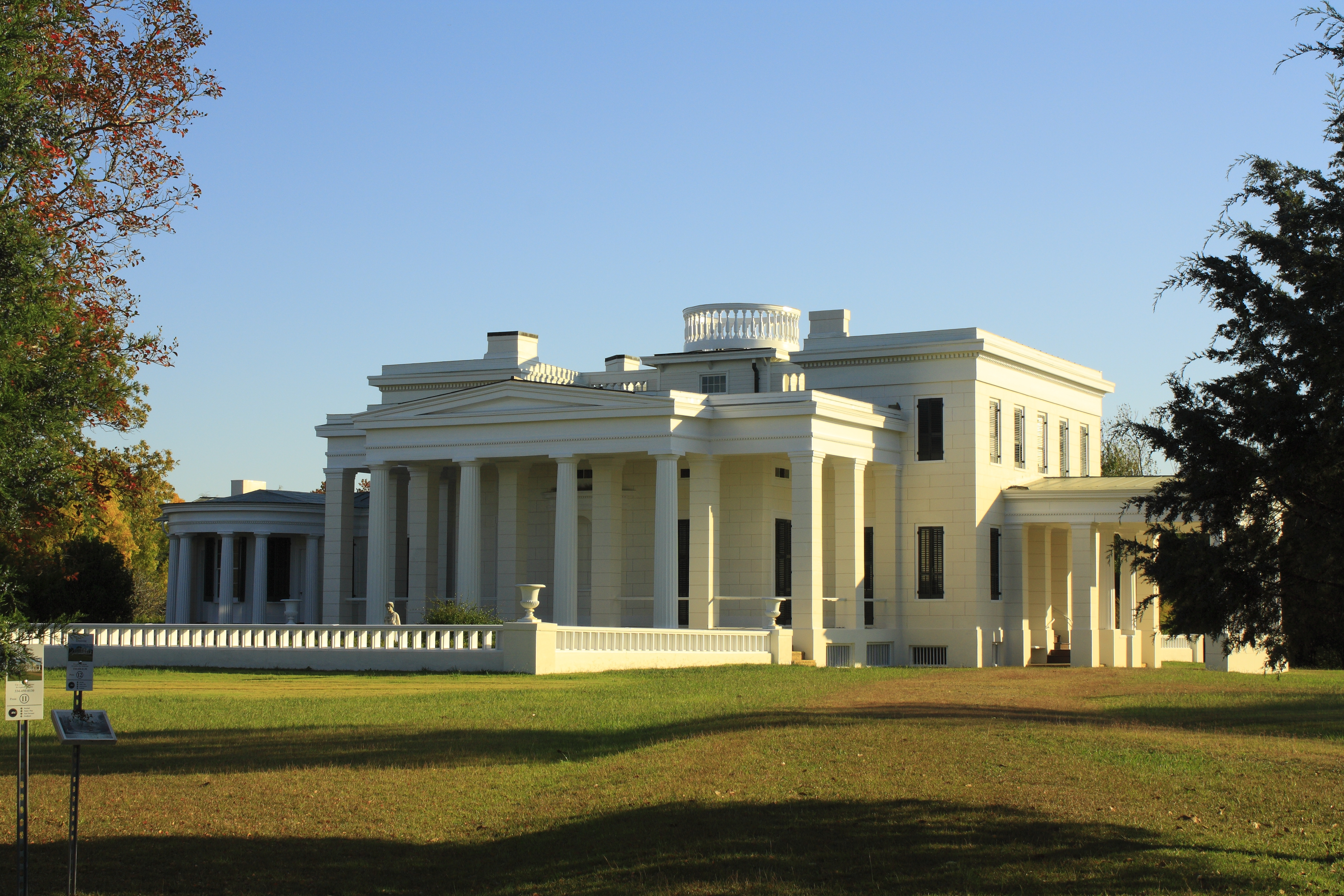
- North facade in October 2011, after completion of an exterior renovation

- Location within Alabama
- Location: 805 South Cedar Avenue; Demopolis, Alabama
- Coordinates: 32°30′29.49″N 87°50′1.26″W
- Built: 1843–61
- Architect: Nathan Bryan Whitfield
- Architectural style: Greek Revival
- Website: www.gaineswoodmuseum.org
- NRHP reference No.: 72000167

Significant dates
- Added to NRHP: January 5, 1972
- Designated NHL: November 7, 1973

Gaineswood is a grand plantation house in Demopolis, Alabama, and a significant remaining example of Greek Revival architecture in Alabama.

The house was built with the profits of forced labor, and much of the actual construction was performed by enslaved people. It was completed on the eve of the American Civil War after a construction period of almost 20 years.

The house and grounds are currently operated by the Alabama Historical Commission as a historic house museum.

== History ==
Gaineswood was designed and built by General Nathan Bryan Whitfield, beginning in 1843 as a dog-trot cabin, an open-hall log dwelling. Whitfield was a cotton planter who had moved from North Carolina to Marengo County, Alabama in 1834. In 1842, Whitfield bought the 480-acre (1.9 km^{2}) property from George Strother Gaines, younger brother of Edmund P. Gaines. By 1860, Whitfield owned as many as 7,200 acres and had 235 enslaved people working his land, which produced nearly 600 bales of cotton that year, though not all at Gaineswood.

The grounds had been the site of a notable historic event while owned by George Gaines. When Gaines was serving as the U.S. Indian Agent, he is said to have met with the famous chief Pushmataha, of the Choctaw Nation, under an old post oak tree on what would become the Gaineswood estate. They were negotiating the terms of the treaty that would lead to the Choctaw removal to Indian Territory. The tree became known as the Pushmataha Oak.

In 1843, Whitfield gave his farm the name of Marlmont; in 1856, he renamed it Gaineswood in honor of Gaines. The Whitfield family tradition maintained that Gaines's original log house was the nucleus around which Whitfield had the mansion built, and that it was located at the present site of the south entrance hall and office. Gen. Whitfield sold the house to his son, Dr. Bryan Watkins Whitfield, in 1861. The second generation of Whitfields maintained Gaineswood as a residence. Mary Foscue Whitfield inherited the nearby Foscue–Whitfield House in 1861 upon her father's death and used that as a residence as well. In 1923 the Whitfield family sold Gaineswood. After years of use as a private residence, Gaineswood was purchased in 1966 by the state of Alabama from Dr. J.D. McLeod, for preservation as a house museum.

== Architecture ==
Gaineswood was completed in its current Greek Revival form in 1861. It is considered to be "Alabama's finest neoclassical house" and one of America's most unusual neoclassical mansions. Gaineswood is one of the few Greek Revival homes in the United States that uses all three of the ancient Greek architectural orders: Doric, Ionic, and Corinthian. Built when tastes were shifting to the Italianate style, it features a partially asymmetrical layout. Whitfield is known to have designed most of the house from pattern books by James Stuart, Minard Lafever, Nicholas Revett and others. Much of the work on the house was executed by highly skilled artisans who, while doing the work were given shelter and food in exchange. During these times many worked on farms in exchange for housing and minimal funds as work was scarce.

=== Exterior ===
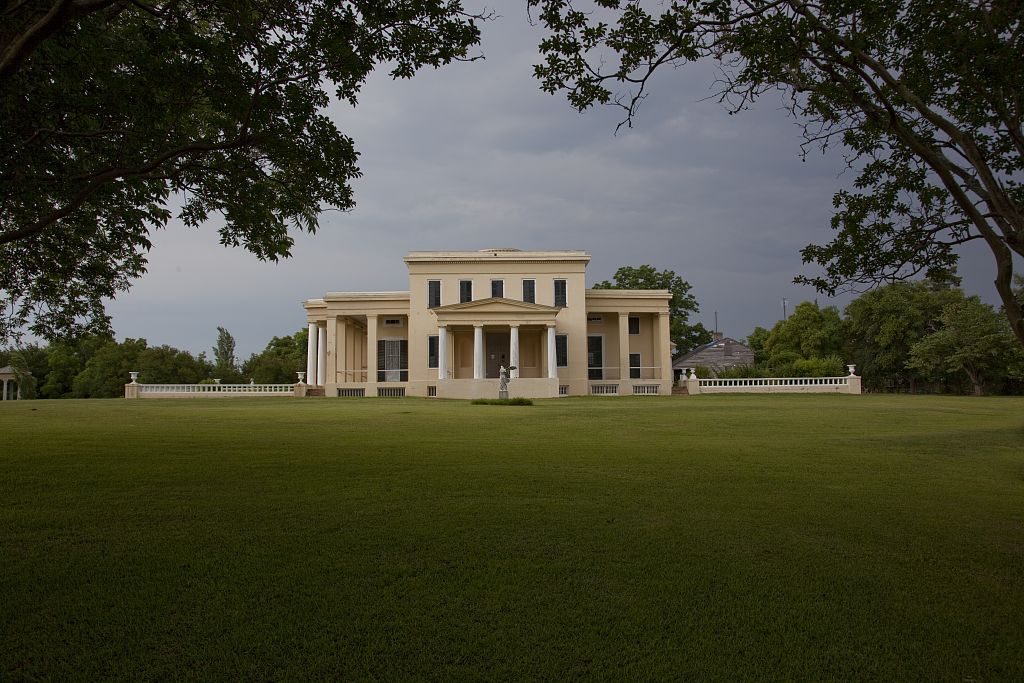
The front elevation, showing the porte-cochère of the main entrance, side porticoes, the flanking parterre walls, as seen from the front allée.

The exterior has a decorative stucco over brick treatment, intended to simulate ashlar blocks. The exterior features the use of eighteen fluted Doric columns and 14 plain square pillars to support the three porches, the main portico, and the porte-cochère. The assorted porches surround most of three sides of the structure. Parterre gardens off of the main north portico and south porch are surrounded by low masonry and wood balustrades and feature period-appropriate plantings and marble statuary. A rooftop observation ring with a vasiform balustrade surmounts the house and was used for observing the estate.

The estate has three surviving outbuildings: a cook's house, a garden pavilion with eight fluted Corinthian columns, and a monumental gatehouse that date to the antebellum period. The tripartite entrance gate features massive pillars crowned by large metal finials and elaborate cast iron gates. The gatehouse and gates had to be moved closer to the house as the city streets were widened in the 20th century. No quarters for the enslaved residents were preserved, although some may have existed into the early 20th century for use as residences for workers on the plantation.

=== Interior ===
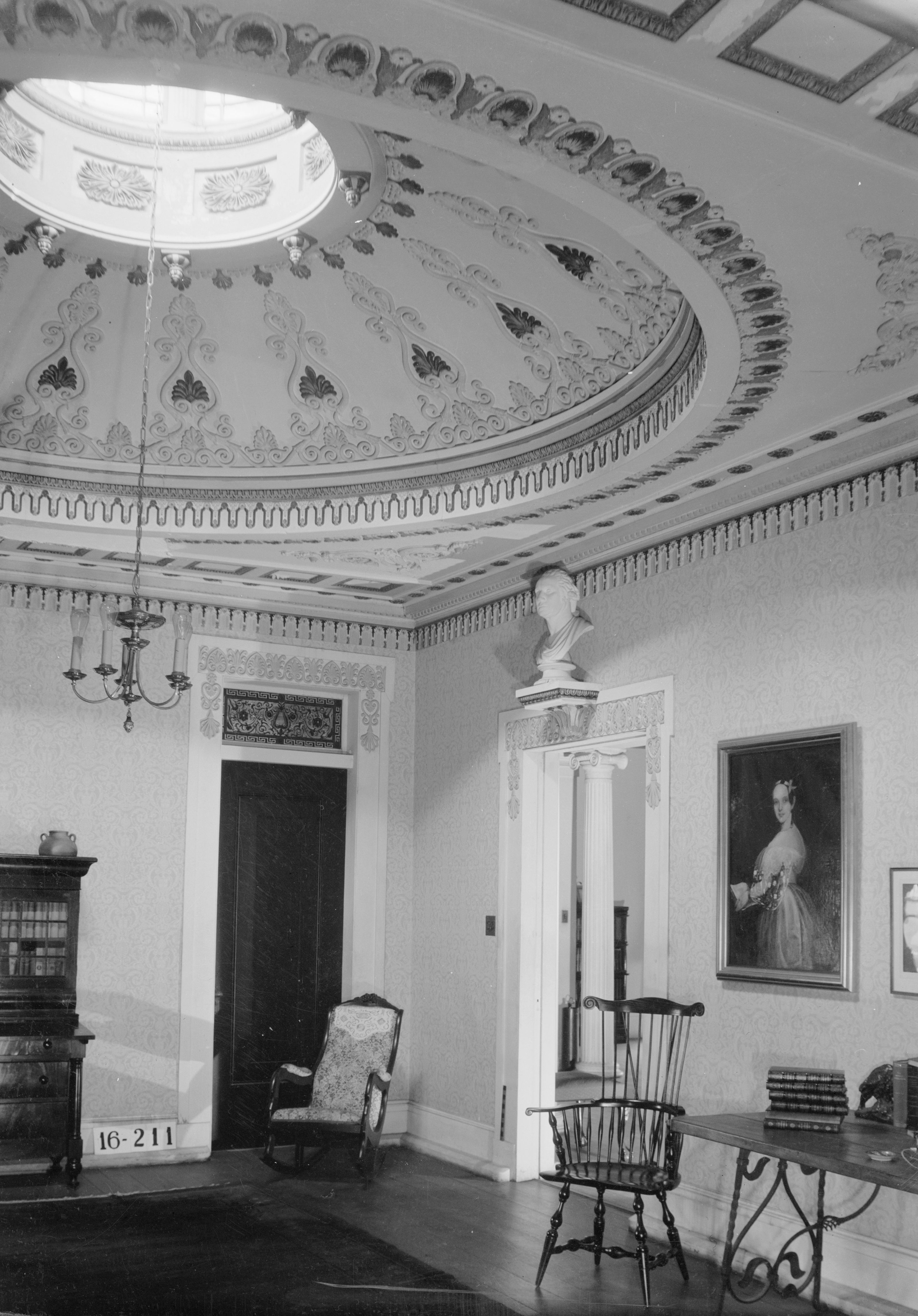
The lantern dome, used to admit daylight into the interior, in the library. A matching dome is in the dining room across the hall.

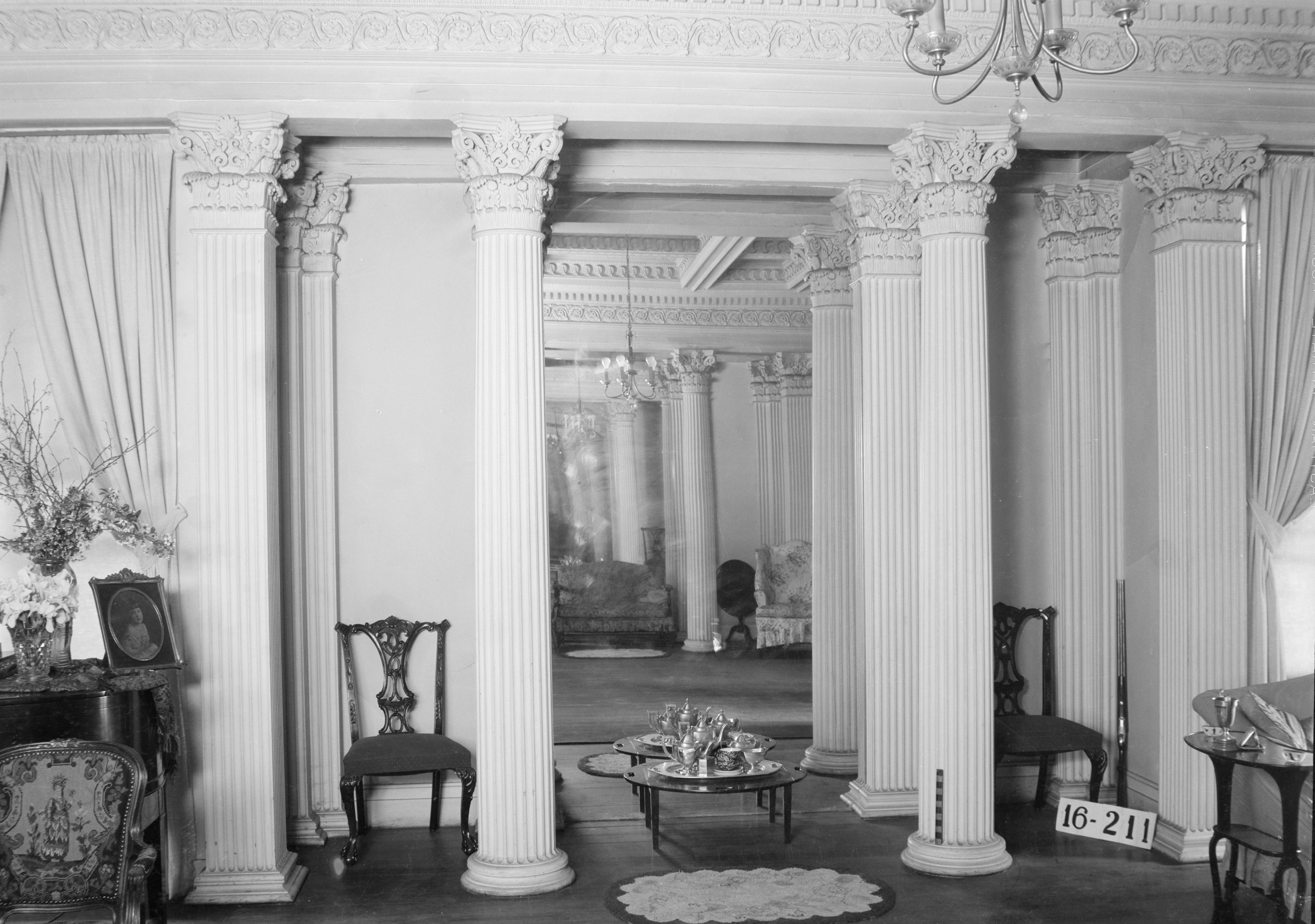
The elaborate plasterwork in the ballroom.

The interior features decorative plasterwork throughout the main floor. The library and the dining room both feature elaborate domed ceilings with central skylights. The hallway features fluted Ionic columns in the main entrance hall with reception rooms to either side, one for each sex.

The master's bedroom also features two fluted Ionic columns supporting a cornice that visually divides the room into bedroom and sitting room.

The mistress' bedroom features a large floor-to-ceiling semicircular bay with curved windows and is fronted by two fluted Corinthian columns. Doors to either side of the bay provide access to the semicircular porch outside with its six Doric columns.

The ballroom features four fluted Corinthian columns and 24 fluted Corinthian pilasters, vis-à-vis mirrors, an elaborate plaster cornice, and a coffered ceiling.

The second floor is much simpler in decor and contains a boudoir, a nursery, and four large bedrooms.

== Whitfield canal ==
Whitfield directed the digging of a drainage canal 1845 and 1863 to prevent water from overflowing and flooding the plantation. Enslaved people dug it by hand. The rainfall on a large section of the Gaineswood estate originally had to follow a 17-mile (27 km) course to reach the Tombigbee River. About one mile (1.6 km) long, the canal was dug to a depth of more than 30 feet (9.1 m) deep through the underlying chalk in some areas; it quickly diverts the surface water into the river at Demopolis.

== Present ==
Gaineswood is on the National Register of Historic Places and was designated a National Historic Landmark in 1973. The estate is owned by the state of Alabama and is administered by the Alabama Historical Commission. Severe moisture damage to the ceiling and dome in the dining room was corrected under a Save America's Treasures grant.

The Whitfield family has donated or sold much of the original family furniture and some statuary to the Historical Commission to be used in the house. The Burning of the Eliza Battle, painted by Nathan B. Whitfield, still hangs at Gaineswood. He was a witness to the steamboat disaster in 1858.

== See also ==
- List of National Historic Landmarks in Alabama
- National Register of Historic Places listings in Marengo County, Alabama
