= Bryan Whitfield Herring Farm =

Historic house in North Carolina, United States

- U.S. National Register of Historic Places
- Location within North Carolina Location within the United States
- Location: NC 1311, 1 mile (1.6 km) east of the junction with NC 1302, near Calypso, North Carolina
- Coordinates: 35°9′57″N 78°7′37″W
- Area: 28 acres (11 ha)
- Built: c. 1850
- Architectural style: Greek Revival
- NRHP reference No.: 01001315
- Added to NRHP: November 29, 2001

The Bryan Whitfield Herring Farm is a historic plantation house located near Calypso, Duplin County, North Carolina. It was built about 1850, and is a 2 1/2-story, five bay by four bay, gable-end, frame house in the Greek Revival style. It features a double-story entrance porch and four massive gable~end chimneys.

It was listed on the National Register of Historic Places in 2001.

== See also ==
- Needham Whitfield Herring House
