= Needham Whitfield Herring House =

Historic house in North Carolina, United States

- U.S. National Register of Historic Places
- Location within North Carolina Location within the United States
- Location: 201 NC 24-50, Kenansville, North Carolina
- Coordinates: 34°57′28″N 77°58′51″W
- Area: 5.5 acres (2.2 ha)
- Built: 1853
- Architectural style: Greek Revival, Queen Anne
- NRHP reference No.: 94000529
- Added to NRHP: May 26, 1994

The Needham Whitfield Herring House, also known as Murray House, is a historic plantation house located near Kenansville, Duplin County, North Carolina. It was built in 1853, and is a two-story, three-bay, single pile, frame house in the Greek Revival style. It features a handsome double-story pedimented porch. The house was enlarged about 1890 with the addition of two one-story Queen Anne style hipped roof wings. Also on the property are the contributing carriage house, smokehouse, and barn.

It was listed on the National Register of Historic Places in 1994.

== See also ==
- Bryan Whitfield Herring Farm
