= R. Fenwick Taylor =

American judge (1849–1928)

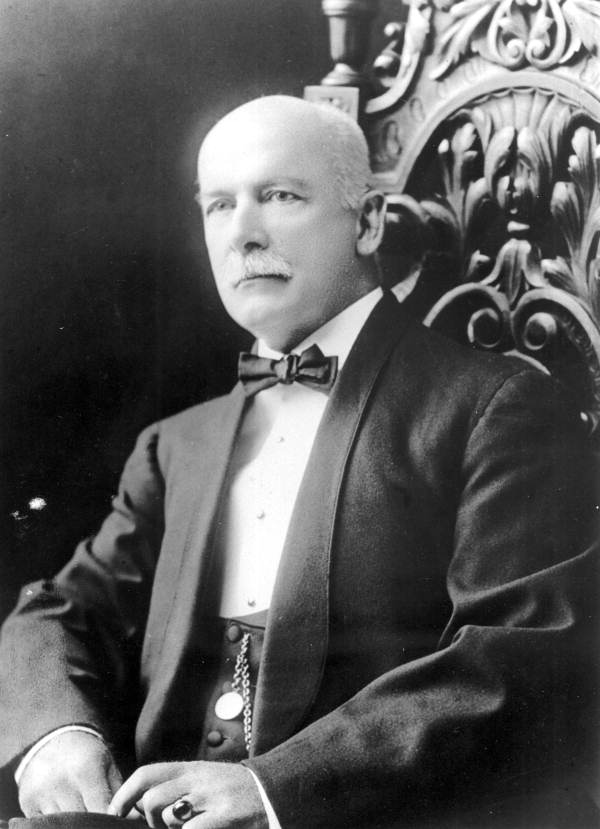
- Taylor in 1891

Justice of the Florida Supreme Court
- In office January 1, 1891 – February 28, 1925

Personal details
- Born: Robert Fenwick Taylor; March 10, 1849 Myrtle Hill, South Carolina
- Died: February 26, 1928 (aged 78) Tallahassee, Florida
- Party: Democratic
- Spouse: Amelia E. Haile (m. 1872)
- Children: 3
- Education: Read law
- Occupation: Jurist, politician

Robert Fenwick Taylor (March 10, 1849 – February 26, 1928) was an American lawyer and a Democratic politician who served on the Florida Supreme Court for 35 years, 18 of them as chief justice. He was first appointed on January 1, 1891. He resigned February 28, 1925. He served three terms as Chief Justice, from 1897 to 1905, from 1915 to 1917, and from 1923 to 1925.

== Early life ==
Justice Taylor was born in Myrtle Hill, South Carolina. His father, John Morgandollar Taylor, was a cotton and rice planter in Beaufort District, South Carolina. His mother was Maria (Baker) Taylor. The family moved to Marion County, Florida, before Taylor was three. His father owned the Osceola Plantation where enslaved laborers including Samuel Small were enslaved.

Taylor was tutored at home. During the American Civil War he fought as a volunteer including at the Battle of Gainesville. After the end of the war he went to school at Baltimore's Maryland Military Institute (MMI). He left MMI and was tutored in "ancient languages" before reading law. Taylor then read law with his brother-in-law, Gainesville, Florida, attorney James B. Dawkins, an attendee of the Florida Secession Convention and a member of the Congress of the Confederate States. In 1870 he was admitted to the Ocala Bar.

== Career ==
He and Dawkins shared a law practice in Gainesville for seven years. After Dawkins became a judge, Taylor partnered with Edward C. F. Sanchez. He worked behind the scenes in Democratic, anti-Reconstruction politics until Alachua County Democrats sent him and Dawkins to the Florida Constitutional Convention of 1885, where he chaired a committee.

Taylor was appointed to the Florida Supreme Court in January 1891 by Governor Francis P. Fleming to replace outgoing Justice Henry Laurens Mitchell. He was re-elected to the Court six times. He served three terms as chief justice. As a conservative defender of personal and property rights, he wrote more than 500 opinions and was involved in more than 7,000 cases.

Taylor wrote the opinion for the Florida Supreme Court in Sligh vs Kirkwood (Sheriff). In this case, the Court unanimously upheld a law prohibiting exportation of "fruit unfit for consumption." Sligh had sued to overturn his conviction for delivering immature fruit to Georgia, saying the Florida law trespassed on Congresses sole authority to regulate interstate trade. Ironically, he also said the law was in conflict with the Pure Food and Drug Act of 1906. Although the law did incidentally prohibit the interstate sale of "green" fruit, it was when the state's police powers to protect public health. The Act banned "commerce in filthy, decomposed or putrid vegetable products", but made no mention of immature fruit. The Court held that this left the matter of immature fruit up to the states, and that the state law conflicted with no federal law.

The "Wells Quart Law" had been passed as part of the Florida Legislature's efforts to curb the sale of liquor. It forbade the transport of alcoholic beverages into counties where their sale was prohibited. The court held that this restricted personal property rights. The law was unconstitutional, in that although it could regulate the sale and transport of alcoholic beverages, the legislature did not have the authority to restrict private ownership or use of alcoholic beverages.

The "Davis Package Law", enacted in 1915, prohibited the sale of alcoholic beverages in packages smaller than 1 pint, open containers, and consumption at the point of sale. In Ex parte Pricha,, liquor dealers contended the law violated Florida's Constitution, "by depriving citizens of . . . inalienable rights, including acquiring, possessing, and protecting property, without due process." The court split, writing four different decisions. Justice Shackleford rejected the notion that the law was unconstitutional. Justice Ellis contended strongly that the legislature had exceeded its power. Justice Taylor concurred with Ellis, that the law was an unconstitutional usurpation on the people's authority to prohibit liquor sales (or not) by popular vote in each county, and that the law violated the sanctity of private property.

Taylor resigned form the Court on February 28, 1925.

== Personal ==
He married Amelia E. Haile in 1872. They had three children, Carl Hugo, Serena Haile, and an unnamed baby girl who died soon after birth. He was a Mason and a member of the Presbyterian Church. He died of pneumonia and kidney failure on February 26, 1928, at his home in Tallahassee.

== Sources ==
- Appletons' Annual Cyclopaedia and Register of Important Events. D. Appleton and company. 1897.
- Justices of the Florida Supreme Court. July 23, 2008.
- Manley, Walter W., Brown, E. Canter. and Rise, Eric W. The Supreme Court of Florida and Its Predecessor Courts, 1821-1917. pp 290–293. University Press of Florida. Gainesville, Florida. 1997. eBook ISBN 978-0-8130-2298-7. ISBN 978-0-8130-1540-8. at Netlbrary. Online. July 23, 2008.
- The Passing of the Gavel to the Honorable R. Fred Lewis. Online. July 23, 2008.
- The Political Graveyard
- Thursby, Mary Agnes. Succession of Justices of Supreme Court of Florida. Online. July 23, 2008, 2008.
