= Foscue–Whitfield House =

Historic house in Alabama, United States

- U.S. National Register of Historic Places
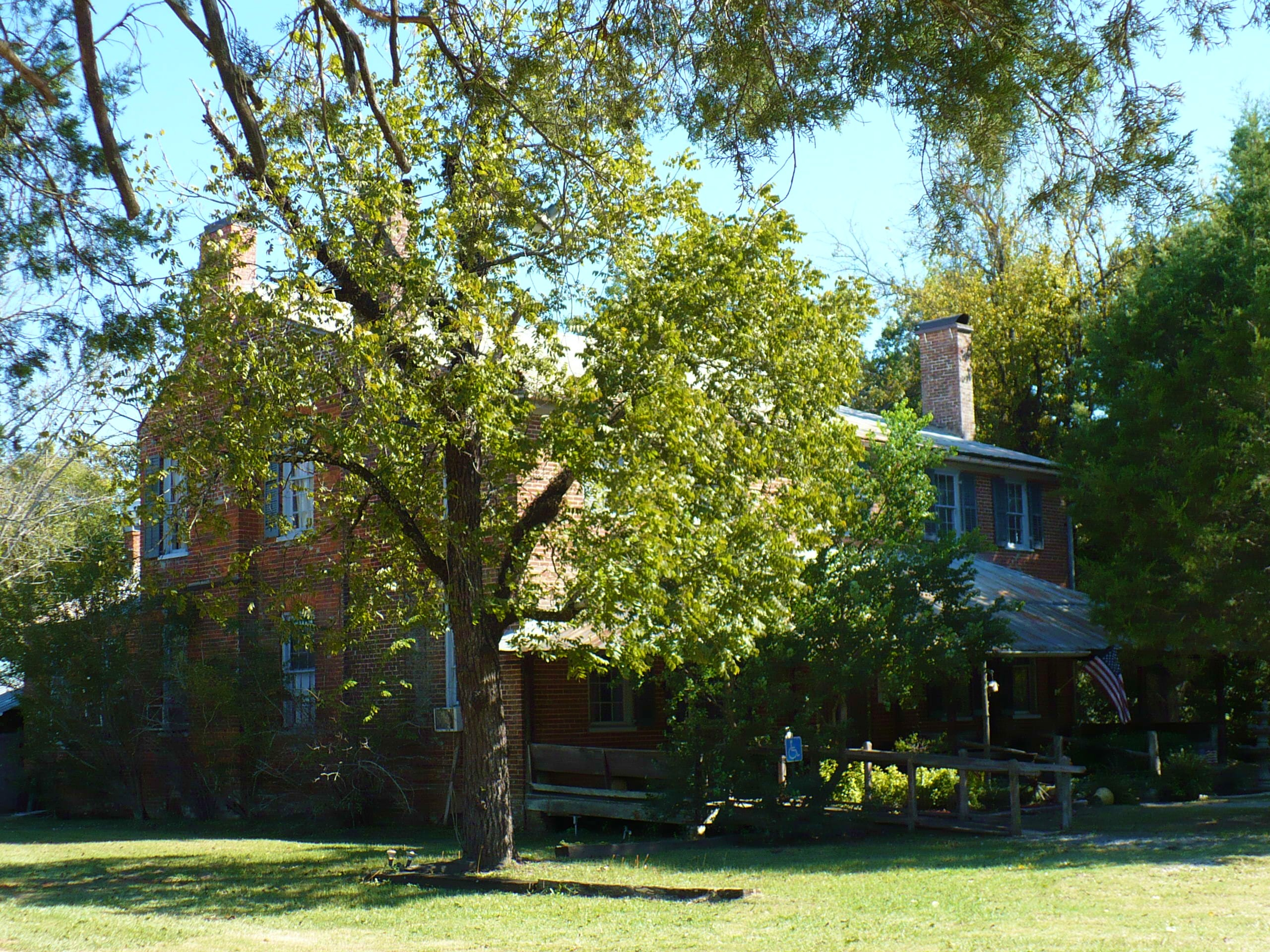
- The Foscue House in 2010

- Location within Alabama Location within the United States
- Location: near Demopolis, Alabama
- Coordinates: 32°29′6.72″N 87°52′1.20″W
- Area: 1 acre (0.40 ha)
- Built: 1840
- Architectural style: Federal
- NRHP reference No.: 74000423
- Added to NRHP: January 21, 1974

The Foscue–Whitfield House, also known as the Foscue House, is a historic Federal style plantation house just outside the city limits of Demopolis, Alabama, United States.

== History ==
The Foscue House was built in 1840 by Augustus Foscue as the family residence for his plantation. In 1855 Augustus' daughter, Mary Alice Foscue, married Dr. Bryan Watkins Whitfield, son of the builder of Gaineswood. Augustus died in 1861 and the house was inherited by Mary and her husband. The house has remained in the Whitfield family to the present day and was recently restored by a descendant.

== Description ==
The house is two and a half stories and built with handmade brick. It features a five-bay facade at the front elevation and a gabled roof. A new brick addition was built onto the front of the house in 1849, requiring the removal of a two-tiered, columned entrance portico. A smaller columned entrance portico was added at that time. The full-width front porch with a hipped roof was added in 1920 by Jesse Whitfield, grandson of the builder, replacing the portico from 1849.
