= William Whitfield III =

William Whitfield III (June 1, 1743 in Rockford, North Carolina – March 1817) was a soldier and slave owner. The son of William Whitfield II, he fought in the Battle of Moore's Creek Bridge during the American Revolutionary War.

In 1778, Whitfield was appointed justice of the peace for Dobbs County. Along with his son, he was a director and trustee for designing and building the town of Wanesboro. He married four times and had 29 children. Forty of his descendants served in the Confederate army. He died in March, 1817.
