= William Whitfield II =

American Army officer

William Whitfield II (May 20, 1715 in Chowan County, North Carolina – March 31, 1795 in Bertie County, North Carolina) was a Captain of the 6th Virginia Regiment during the American Revolutionary War and a planter. He purchased Seven Springs, North Carolina from Buckskin Williams, the father of Benjamin Williams, the Governor of North Carolina.

== Family ==
He was a son of William Whitfield I, the patriarch of the Whitfield family of the United States. He married Rachel Bryan. James Whitfield (1791-1875), the 18th Governor of Mississippi, 1851-52 was his grandnephew, while Henry L. Whitfield (1868 -1927), the 41st Governor of Mississippi, was his great-great-great grandson.

== Background ==
His sons, Needham Whitfield and William Whitfield III were in the Battle of Moore's Creek Bridge during the revolutionary war. He was a former clerk to Colonel Caswell and the other a private in the Light Horse Cavalry, taking prisoner General McDonald, who was the Commander of the Tories.

William was a Dobbs County member to the 1761 and 1762 North Carolina General Assembly held in Wilmington. In 1779 he was a member of Governor Richard Caswell's Council held in New Berne, and a Justice of Peace for Johnston County, North Carolina. He was later a Colonel.

== Sources ==
- William Whitfield profile at The National Society of the Colonial Dames of America
