= George Strother Gaines =

Alabama politician, American Indian agent and banker

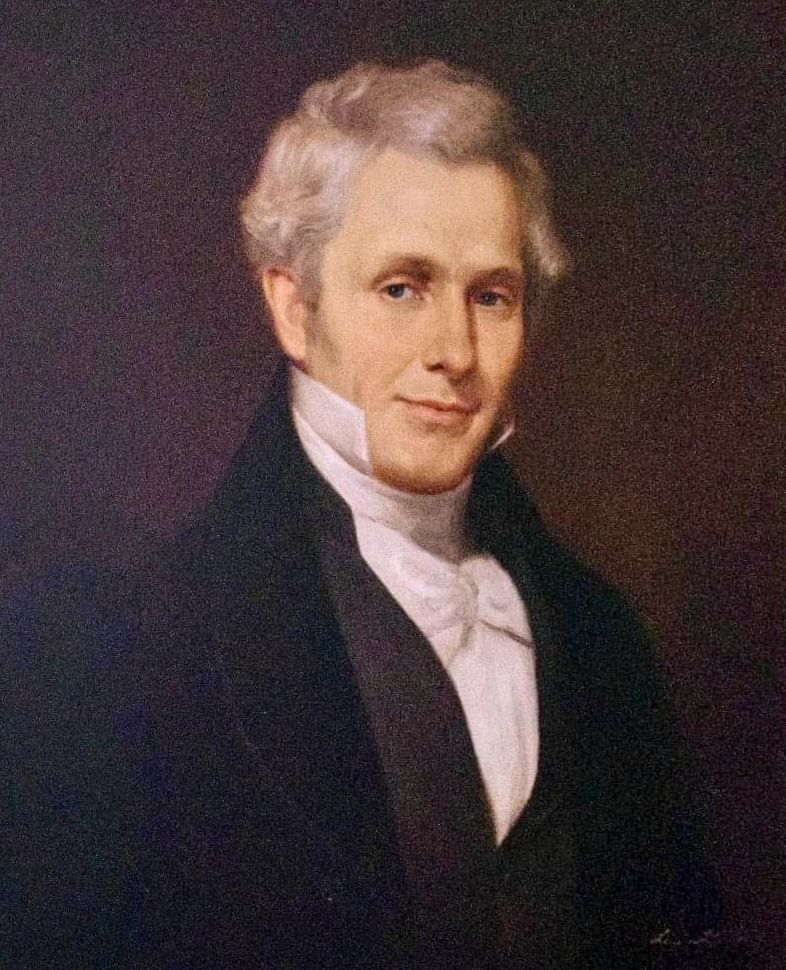
- Born: May 1, 1784; North Carolina
- Died: January 21, 1873 (aged 88); State Line, Mississippi
- Resting place: Peachwood Cemetery, State Line, Mississippi
- Occupations: Alabama State Senator, Choctaw Indian agent, banker
- Relatives: Edmund P. Gaines, brother

George Strother Gaines (1 May 1784 – 21 January 1873) was a federal Indian agent in the Mississippi Territory (today's Alabama and Mississippi). He began as the US Indian agent to the Choctaw, explored the country west of the Mississippi River, and supervised the removal of the Choctaw to Indian Territory in the 1830s. He worked as a banker, and served as a state senator and railroad lobbyist, becoming even more influential in the early history of the region.

== Life ==
Gaines was born in North Carolina on 1 May 1784, the 11th of 13 children of Captain James Gaines and Elizabeth (née Strother) Gaines. His father had served in the Revolutionary War, and both parents came from prominent Virginia families. His older brother, Edmund Pendleton Gaines, for whom Gainesville, Florida was named, rose to the rank of major general in the U.S. Army. Not long after George's birth, the family moved to Gallatin, Tennessee.

In 1804 Gaines was appointed to work for the federal government as an assistant Indian factor at the Choctaw Trading House in St. Stephens, Mississippi Territory (now in Alabama). Indian factors coordinated trading practices and served as personal contacts between the government and the tribes. St. Stephens was a small settlement on the banks of the Tombigbee River.

In 1806 the senior Indian factor, Joseph Chambers, resigned and Gaines succeeded him. In this position he earned the respect of Indians and settlers. As tensions grew as settlers encroached on Choctaw land and competed for natural resources, Gaines was able to maintain a degree of calm in the region. After the Fort Mims massacre in 1813 by a faction of the Creek Indians, Gaines convinced the Choctaw and Chickasaw to help defend the lower Tombigbee River valley. He outfitted Choctaw volunteers to fight against the Creek during the Creek War of 1813-1814, when the US was also involved in the War of 1812.

Gaines resigned his position at the Choctaw Trading House in 1818 to join the Tombeckbee Bank in St. Stephens, by then designated as the temporary capital of the new Alabama Territory. Financial difficulties made worse by the Panic of 1819, forced Gaines to resign in 1822. He moved to Demopolis, Alabama and purchased the Choctaw Trading House from the federal government. Gaines assumed responsibility for its operation, and continued trading with the Choctaw.

Gaines served as a member of the Alabama State Senate from 1825 to 1827. Gaines also served as the president of the Mobile, Alabama, branch bank from 1833 to 1846. Gaines negotiated the Treaty of Dancing Rabbit Creek between the United States and the Choctaw people, acquiring most of their lands in Alabama and Mississippi. At the request of the Choctaw tribe, Gaines led an expedition to scout the prospective Choctaw lands in the Indian Territory, before the Choctaw reluctantly agreed to emigrate there. Gaines was criticized for spending too much money on moving the Choctaw. In comparison to the removal of the Cherokee and other of the Five Civilized Tribes, he accomplished the task in a relatively humane fashion.

He is buried at State Line, Mississippi.

== Personal life ==
Gaines married his cousin, Ann Gaines, around 1812.

== See also ==
- Gainestown, Alabama, community named in his honor, founded on the site of one of his former trading posts
- Edmund P. Gaines, his brother
