= Plantation house =

Main house of a plantation

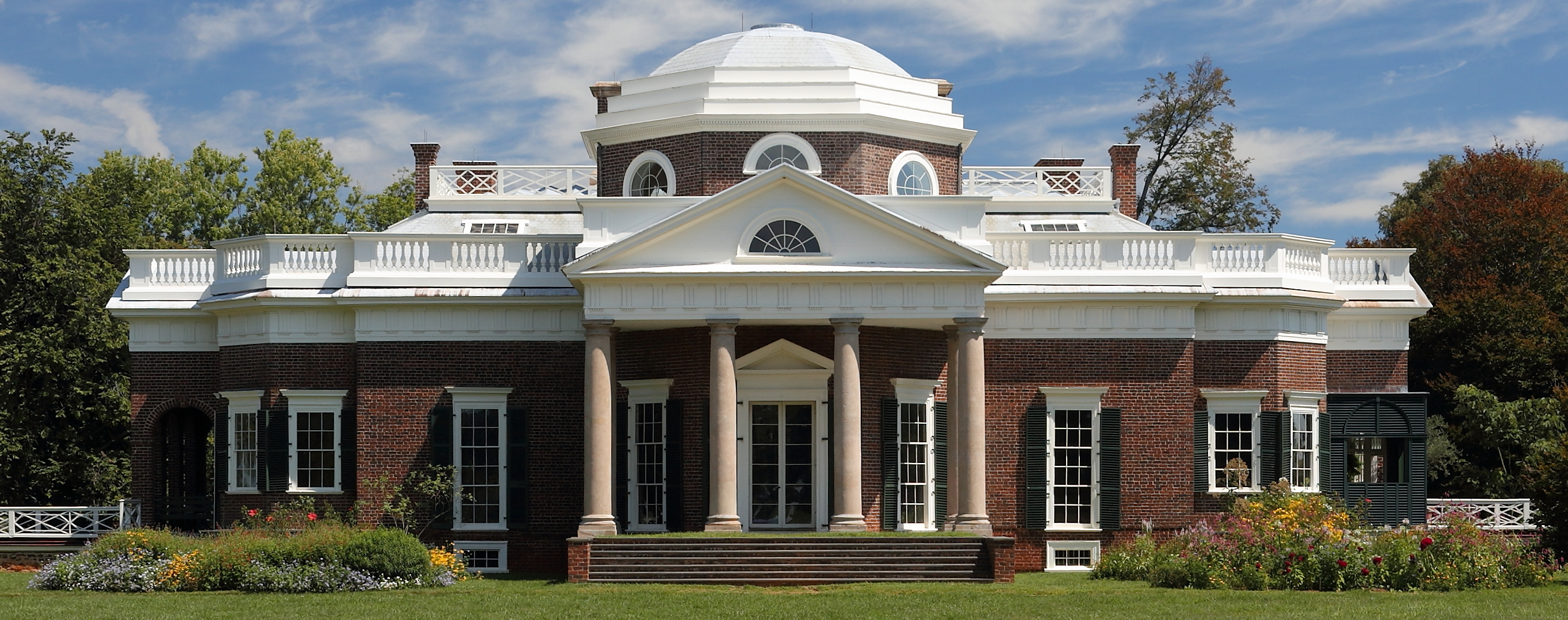
Monticello, located outside Charlottesville, Virginia, was the primary plantation house of Thomas Jefferson

A plantation house is the main house of a plantation, often a substantial farmhouse, which often serves as a symbol for the plantation as a whole. Plantation houses in the Southern United States and in other areas are known as quite grand and expensive architectural works today, though most were more utilitarian, working farmhouses.

== Antebellum American South ==
In the American South, antebellum plantations were centered on a "plantation house," the residence of the owner, where important business was conducted. Slavery and plantations had different characteristics in different regions of the South. As the Upper South of the Chesapeake Bay colonies developed first, historians of the antebellum South defined planters as those who held 20 enslaved people. Major planters held many more, especially in the Deep South as it developed. The majority of slaveholders held 10 or fewer enslaved people, often to labor domestically. By the late 18th century, most planters in the Upper South had switched from exclusive tobacco cultivation to mixed-crop production, both because tobacco had exhausted the soil and because of changing markets. The shift away from tobacco meant they had slaves in excess of the number needed for labor, and they began to sell them in the internal slave trade.

There was a variety of domestic architecture on plantations. The largest and wealthiest planter families, for instance those with estates fronting on the James River in Virginia, constructed mansions in brick and Georgian style. Common or smaller planters in the late 18th and 19th century had more modest wood-frame buildings, such as Southall Plantation in Charles City County.

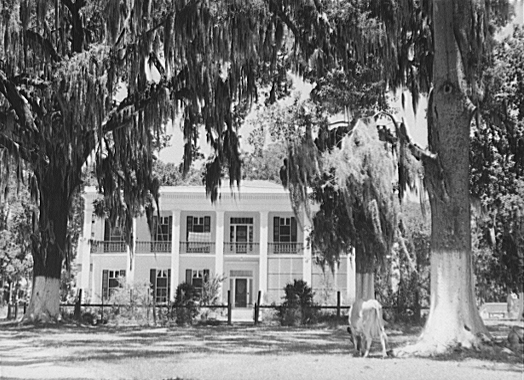
Old Jackson Plantation, Schriever, Louisiana, June 1940

In the Lowcountry of South Carolina, by contrast, even before the American Revolution, planters holding large rice plantations typically owned hundreds of enslaved people. In Charleston and Savannah, the elite also held numerous enslaved people to work as household servants. The 19th-century development of the Deep South for cotton cultivation depended on large plantations with much more acreage than was typical of the Upper South; and for labor, planters held hundreds of enslaved people.

Until December 1865, slavery was legal in parts of the United States. Most enslaved people labored in agricultural production, and planter was a term commonly used to describe a farmer with many enslaved humans. The term planter has no universally-accepted definition, but academic historians have defined it to identify the elite class, "a landowning farmer of substantial means." In the "Black Belt" counties of Alabama and Mississippi, the terms "planter" and "farmer" were often synonymous. Robert Fogel and Stanley Engerman define large planters as owning over 50 enslaved people, and medium planters as owning between 16 and 50 enslaved humans.

In his study of Black Belt counties in Alabama, Jonathan Wiener defines planters by ownership of real property, rather than of enslaved people. A planter, for Wiener, owned at least $10,000 worth of real estate in 1850 and $32,000 worth in 1860, equivalent to about the top 8 percent of landowners. In his study of southwest Georgia, Lee Formwalt also defines planters in size of land holdings rather than enslaved people. Formwalt's planters are in the top 4.5 percent of land owners, translating into real estate worth $6,000 or more in 1850, $24,000 or more in 1860, and $11,000 or more in 1870. In his study of Harrison County, Texas, Randolph B. Campbell classifies large planters as owners of 20 slaves, and small planters as owners of between ten and 19 slaves. In Chicot and Phillips counties, Arkansas, Carl H. Moneyhon defines large planters as owners of 20 or more slaves and 600 or more acres.

== Architectural styles ==
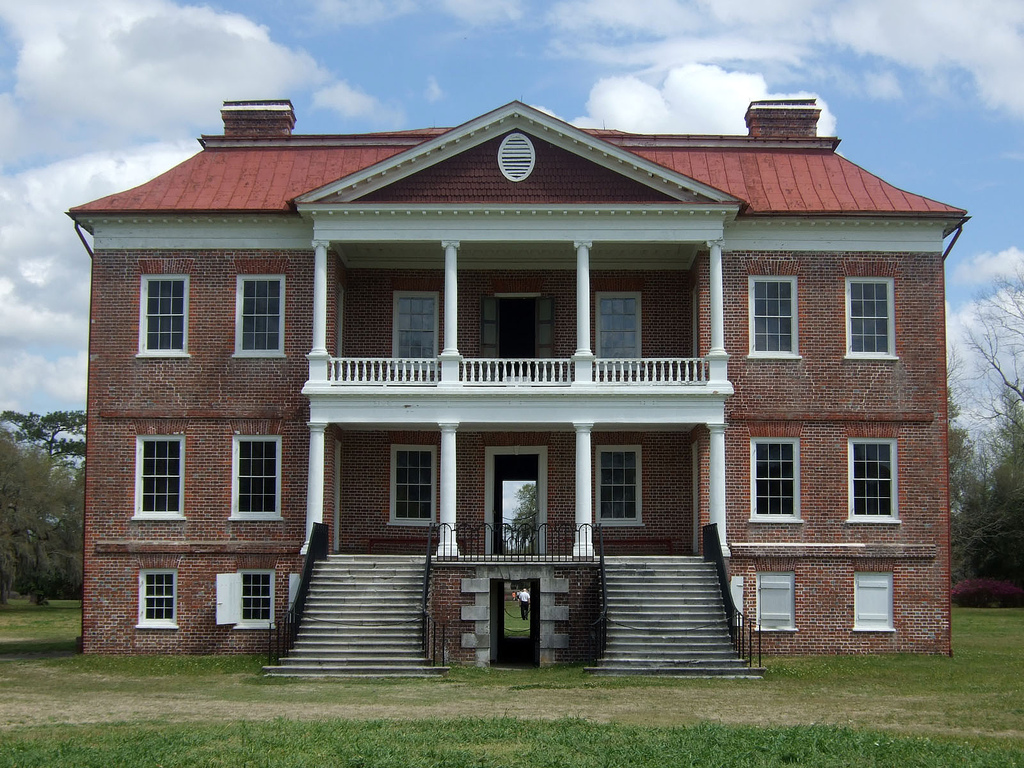
The Palladian-inspired main house at Drayton Hall near Charleston, South Carolina, built in 1738. Its planned side-wings and linking arcades were executed but demolished in the late 19th century.

Most historical research has focused on the main houses of plantations, primarily because they were the most likely to survive and usually the most elaborate structures in the complex. Also, until fairly recent times, scholars and local historians usually focused on the life of the plantation owner, that is, the planter, and his or her family rather than the people they held as slaves. All romanticized notions aside, the plantation house was, at its most basic, a functioning farmhouse. Although some plantation houses were planned as grand mansions and were built all at once from the ground up, many more (such as Mount Vernon) began as fairly rudimentary structures that either stayed that way, were replaced, or were enlarged and improved over time as fortunes improved. In most areas of the South, the earliest settlers constructed houses to provide basic shelter suited to their local climate, not to establish permanence or demonstrate wealth or power.

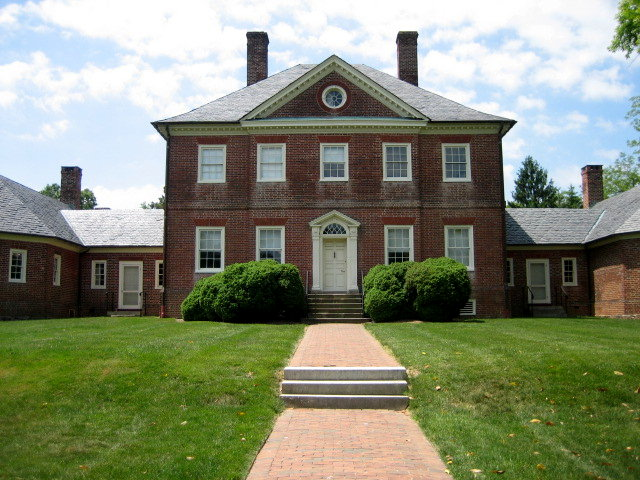
Montpelier near Laurel, Maryland, built 1783. A Georgian-style mansion with Palladian-inspired side wings.

Early plantation houses tended to follow British-derived folk forms such as the hall and parlor house-type and central-passage house-type. Grander structures during the later colonial period usually conformed to the neoclassically-influenced styles, although some very early and rare Jacobean structures survive in Virginia. In French Louisiana the plantations reflected French colonial architecture, some with Spanish influences, that remained in trend well after the Louisiana Purchase in 1803. Following the Revolutionary War, Federal and Jeffersonian-type neoclassicism became dominant in formal plantation architecture.

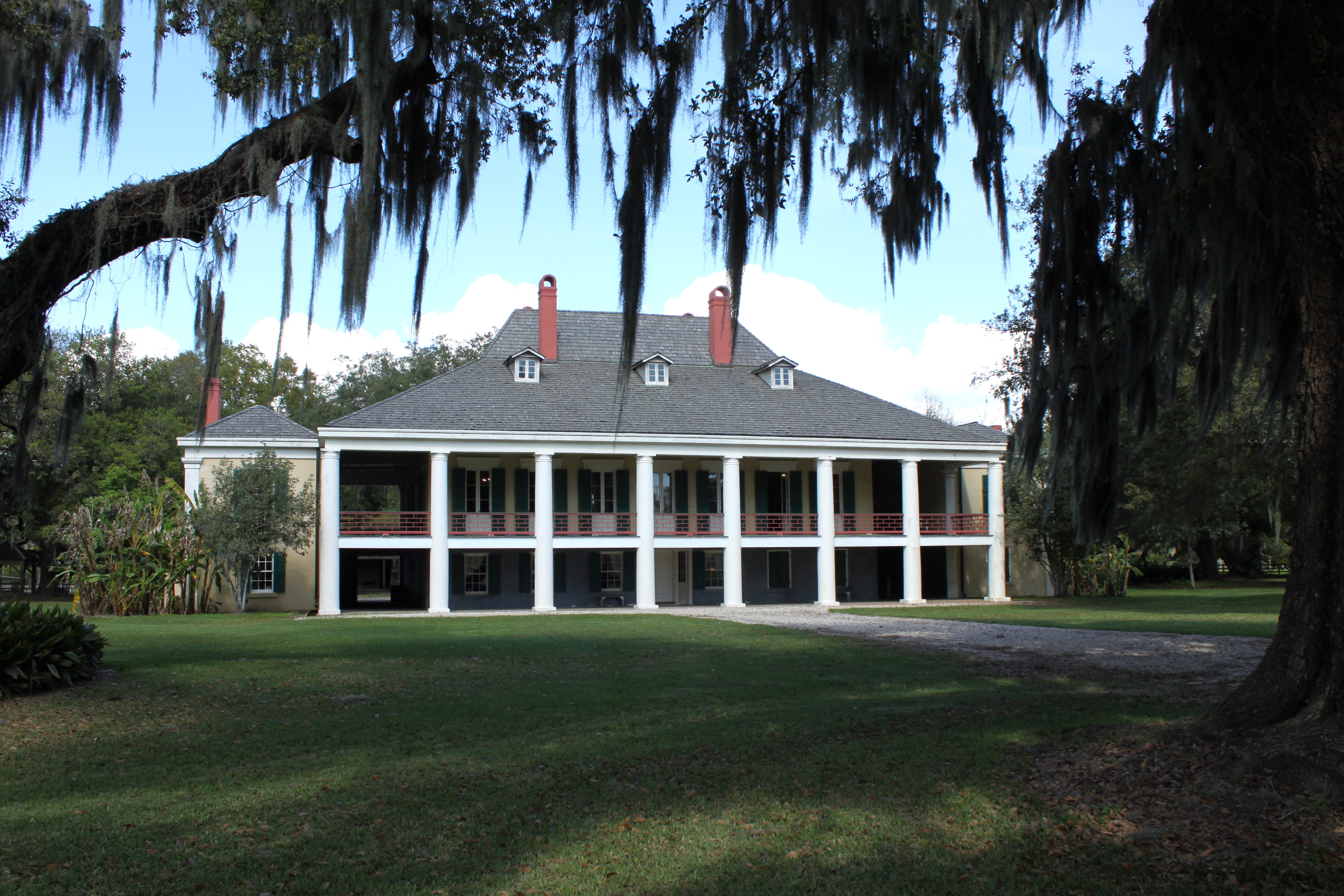
The main house at the Destrehan sugar plantation in Destrehan, Louisiana, built 1787–1790. Built in the French Colonial style, the original slender wooden gallery posts were replaced with monumental Doric columns when the Greek Revival style was popular.

The Chesapeake region features a unique style of plantation homes. These colonial era houses were not especially common because it was not until at least the second half of the 18th century that wooden homes began to signal poverty. Most 18th century families in Virginia lived in single story houses, regardless of their financial status. Even most elite families remained in these houses because at the time, status was represented through the craftsmanship of the house and not the size. Only the top ten percentile of Virginian families at this time could even afford the well-crafted, expensively finished, and sturdier single story wooden houses, much less the brick and column houses which are iconic to Virginia and the surrounding area. These were mostly hall and parlor style homes, and the wealth representation factor was within the quality of the home. This is contrary to the belief that wealthy Virginians in this era resided in the large brick and column style homes, and that the poorer, lower class Virginians only lived in the single story, wooden houses that we know recognize as hall and parlor homes.

The iconic brick and white-pillared homes that are correlated with plantations represent more than wealth. A large misconception about the South is that the plantations featured huge, grand houses to demonstrate their wealth and economic dominance; however, research has shown that building these grand houses served a different purpose. The style and size of these homes were to place an emphasis on the class separation of owner and slave. The purpose was to create a feeling that poor, white laborers and farmers were to be seen as out-of-place on the grounds of the planter's estate. The architecture also extends beyond the main house. Museums and tours have begun to focus on the other buildings around a plantation such as the slave housing and barns. This further establishes the illusion of class separation that the original plantation owners were wanting.

Large portions of the South outside of the original British colonies, such as in Kentucky and Tennessee, did not see extensive settlement until the early 19th century. Although large portions of Alabama and Mississippi were settled at roughly the same time, there were areas of these states, along with portions of western Georgia and southeastern Tennessee, that did not see wide-scale settlement until after the Indian removal in the 1830s. Very little formal architecture existed within these newly settled areas, with most dwellings being of hewn logs into the 1840s. The dogtrot-type plan was common for many of these log houses.

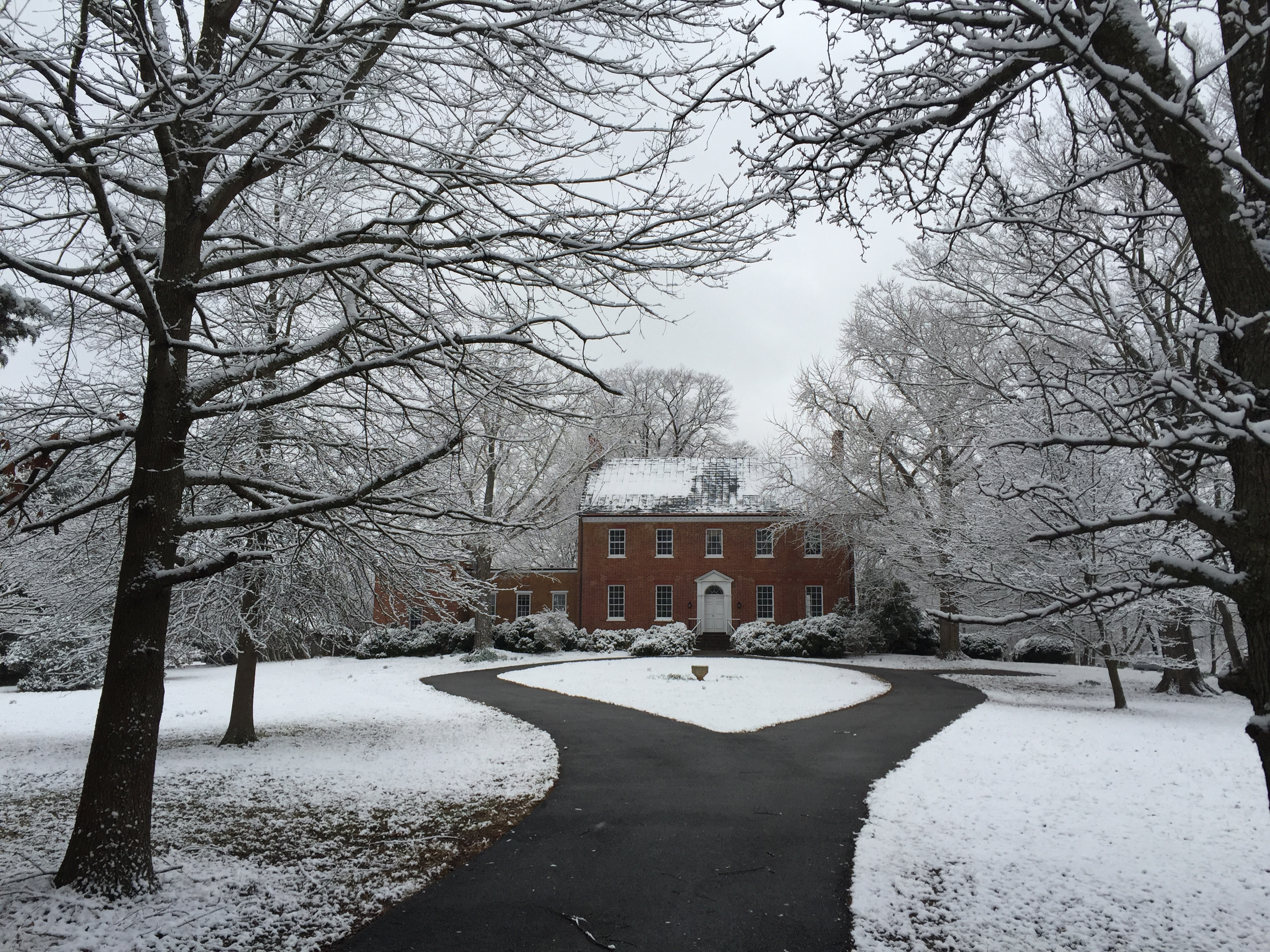
Pleasant Prospect, built c. 1798 in Bowie, Maryland, is an example of the Federal style architecture that was popular following American independence.

Rough vernacular architecture for early plantations was also true in Arkansas and Missouri although in their river regions. Admitted to the Union in the mid-1840s, early architecture in Florida and Texas generally showed a stronger Spanish Colonial architectural influence, blended with French and British forms.

Some of the wealthiest planters never built grand residences. One example was noted by Albert J. Pickett, an early Alabama historian. In 1850, he visited Nicholas Davis, the owner of the prosperous Walnut Grove Plantation. Despite owning more than 100 slaves, he was still living in the large log house he had built after his migration from Virginia in 1817. He told Pickett that he "would not exchange (it) for a palace". Gaineswood, a lavish example of a plantation house, began as a two-story hewn-log dogtrot that was eventually enveloped within the brick mass of the house.

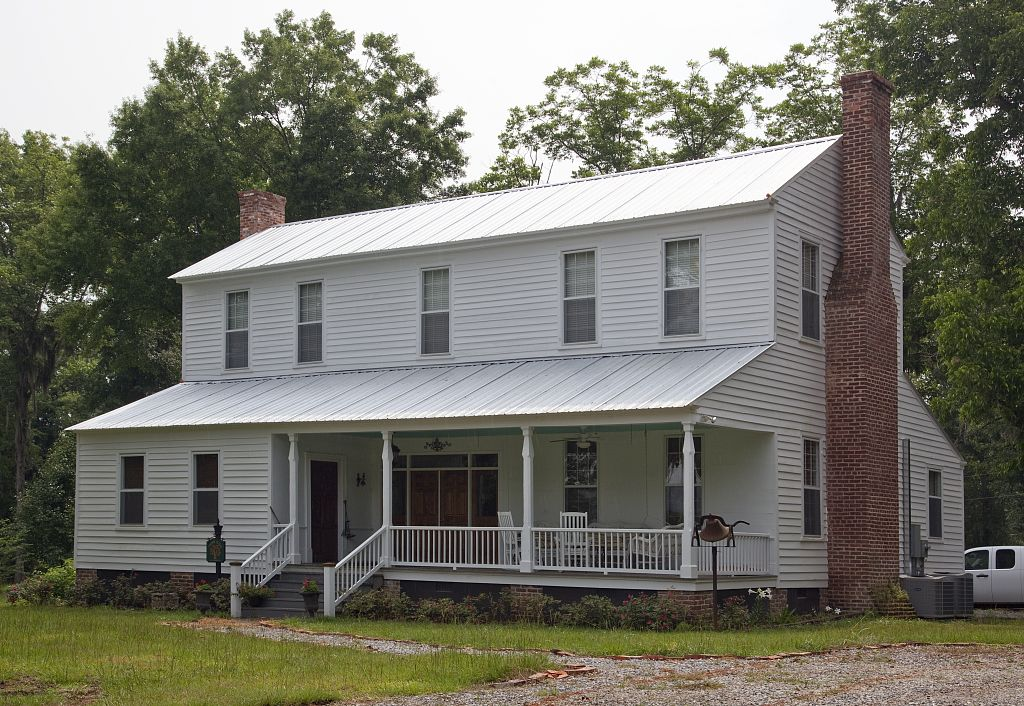
Moss Hill near Pine Apple, Alabama, completed in 1845. An example of a simple I-house or Plantation Plain-style house. This folk house style, along with similarly proportioned log and frame houses, was once the most common type of plantation house.

After the period of initial settlement, more refined folk house types came from the older portions of the South, especially the I-house, thought by architectural scholars to be a descendant of the hall and parlor and the central-passage house-types. The central-passage house continued to be popular and could be either single-pile (one room deep) or double-pile (two rooms deep). If it had a porch, it was under a separate roof attached to the main house. I-houses were two stories high, single-pile, with side gables or a hipped roof. They were at least two rooms wide, with latter examples usually having a central hall dividing them. In the South, they usually had full-width one-story shed extensions to the front and rear. These sheds could manifest as open porches, enclosed rooms, or a combination of the two. This I-house with sheds came to be commonly referred to as "Plantation Plain". It also proved to be one of the most adaptable folk house types to changing architectural tastes, with some even having neoclassical porticoes and other high-style elements added to them at a later date.

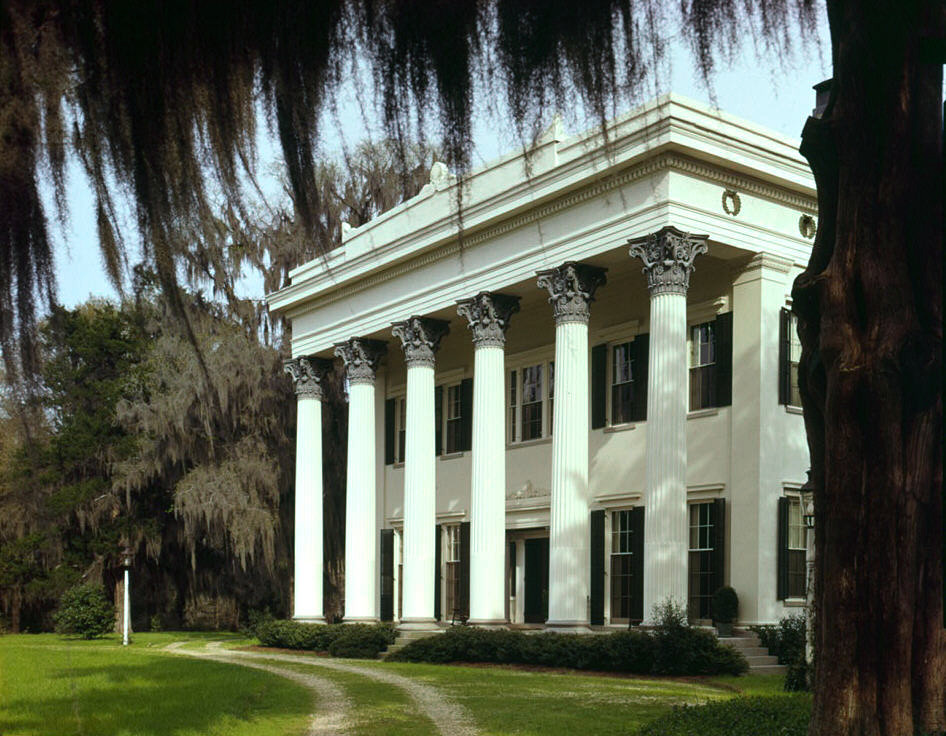
Millford Plantation near Pinewood, South Carolina, regarded as one of the finest examples of Greek Revival residential architecture in the United States.

The Creole cottage came from the areas along the Gulf Coast and its associated rivers that were formerly part of New France. The cottage was one-and-a-half stories with a side-gabled roof, and often had upper floor dormer windows. It accommodated a full-width front porch under the main roof, with doors or jib-windows opening from all of the rooms onto the porch, and was usually raised high above the ground on a full raised basement or piers. It was a common form for many early plantation houses and town houses alike in the lower reaches of Alabama, Louisiana, and Mississippi.

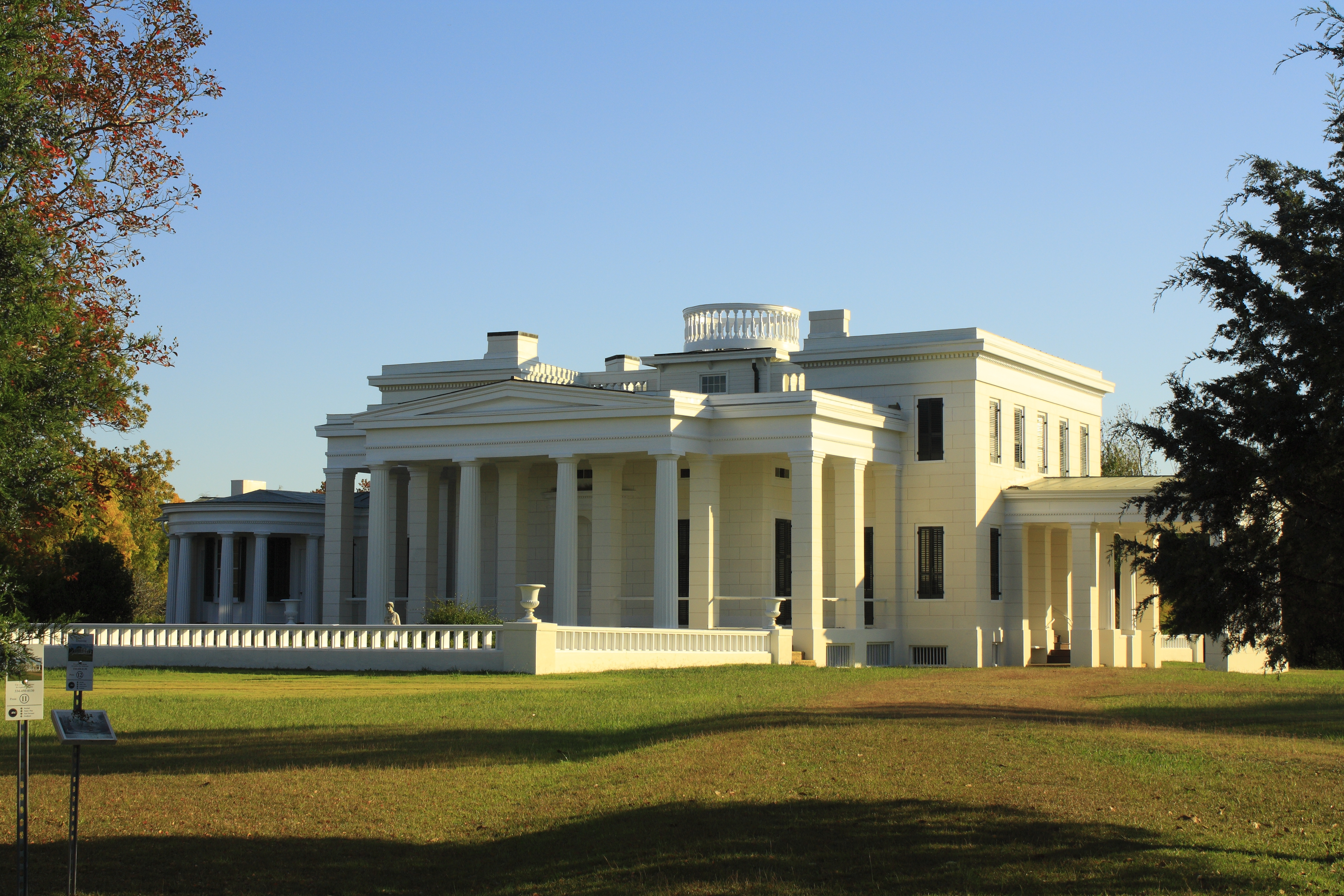
Gaineswood in Demopolis, Alabama, built from 1843 to 1861. Designed by its owner from pattern books, it is a Greek Revival with Italianate-influenced asymmetrical massing.

When the cotton boom years began in the 1830s, the United States was entering its second neoclassical phase, with Greek Revival architecture being the dominant style. By this point trained architects were also becoming more common, and several introduced the style to the South. Whereas the earlier Federal and Jeffersonian neoclassicism displayed an almost feminine lightness, academic Greek Revival was very masculine, with a heaviness not seen in the earlier styles.

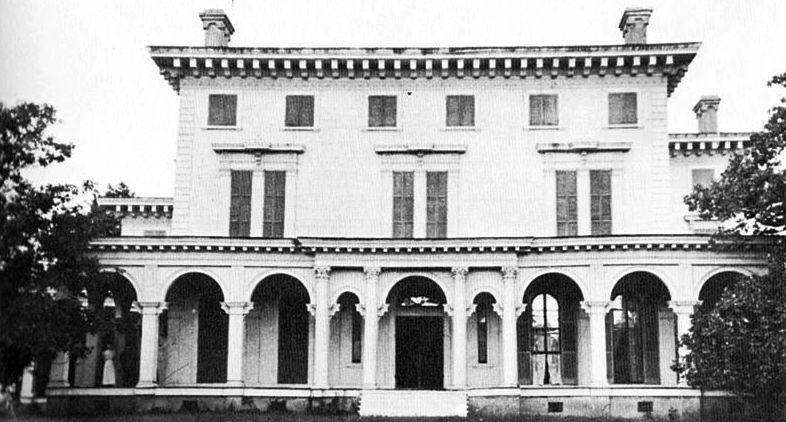
Annandale Plantation in Mannsdale, Mississippi, built from 1857 to 1859. It replaced a log house that the family lived in for almost 20 years. Their new Italianate-style mansion was derived from plans published by Minard Lafever in 1856. It was destroyed by fire in 1924.

Earlier neoclassicism had often used ancient Roman models and the Tuscan order, along with the Roman versions of the original three Greek orders. The original Greek orders were Doric, Ionic, and the Corinthian. The academic version of Greek Revival embraced the pure form of ancient Grecian architecture. Due to its popularity during a time of great wealth for many southern plantations, it was the Greek Revival that became permanently linked to the plantation legend. Though some houses were architect-designed, many, if not most, were designed by the owners or their carpenters from pattern books published by Asher Benjamin, Minard Lafever, John Haviland, and others. Greek Revival proved to very adaptable to the hot and humid climate of the South, with colloquial adaptations of the style seen from one region, and sometimes from one town, to another.

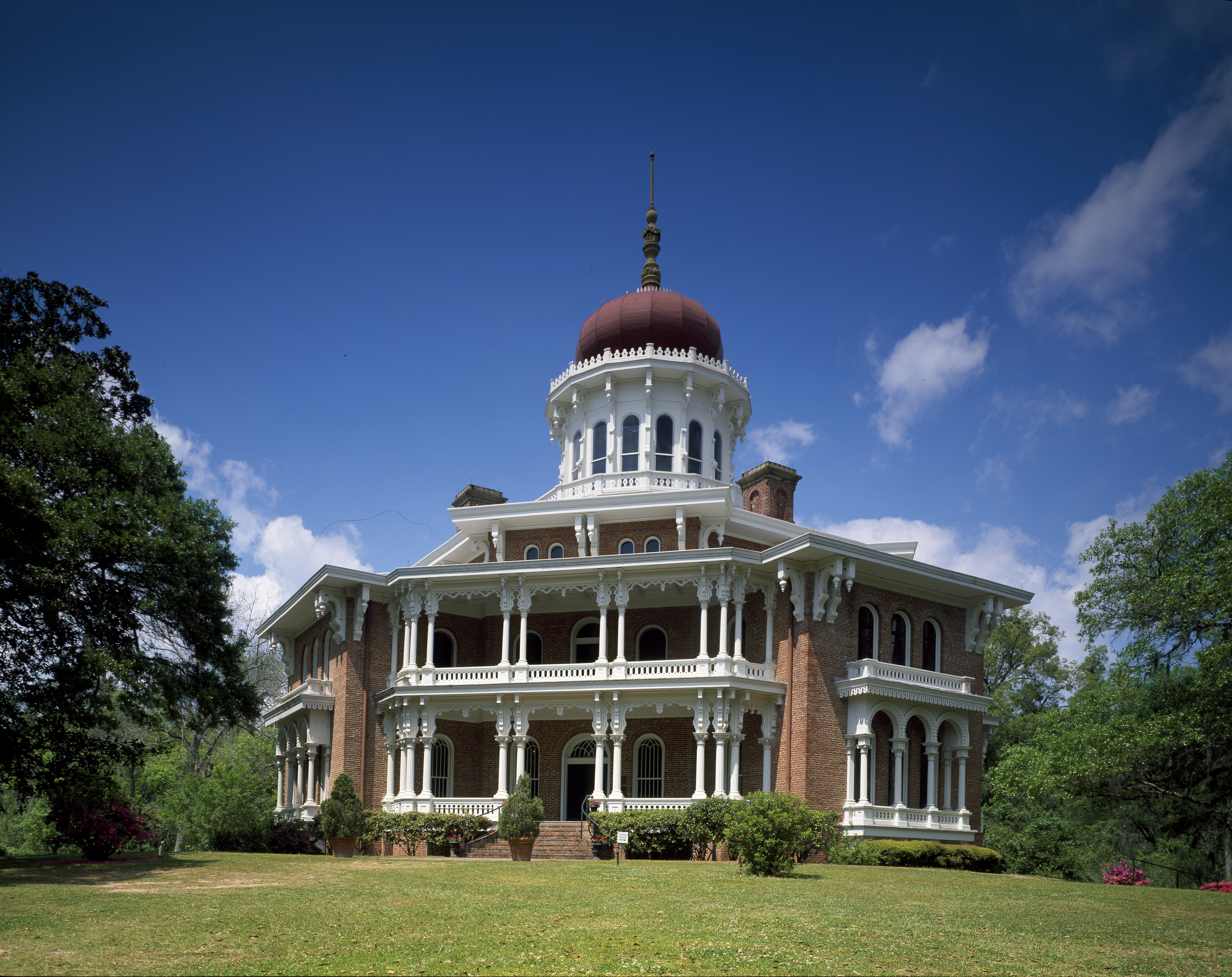
The Samuel Sloan-designed "Oriental Villa" mansion, Longwood, in Natchez, Mississippi. It was started in 1859 and never completed.

Greek Revival would remain a favorite architectural style in the agrarian South until well after the Civil War, but other styles had appeared in the nation about the same time as Greek Revival or soon afterward. These were primarily the Italianate and Gothic Revival. They were slower to be adopted in whole for domestic plantation architecture, but they can be seen in a fusion of stylistic influences. Houses that were basically Greek Revival in character sprouted Italianate towers, bracketed eaves, or adopted the asymmetrical massing characteristic of that style.

Although not as popular as Greek Revival, fully Gothic Revival and Italianate plantation houses began to appear by the 1850s, after being popularized by the books of men such as Alexander Jackson Davis, Andrew Jackson Downing, and Samuel Sloan. The Gothic Revival was usually expressed in wood as Carpenter Gothic. Italianate was the most popular of the two styles. It was also most commonly built using wood construction when used for plantation houses, although a few brick examples, such as Kenworthy Hall, have survived.

The outbreak of war in 1861 put an abrupt end to the building of grand mansions. Following the war and the end of Reconstruction, the economy was drastically altered. Planters often did not have the funds for upkeep of their existing houses, and new construction virtually ceased on most plantations. The new sharecropping method kept many plantations going, but the days of extravagance were over.
