= Watson (surname) =

- Pronunciation: /ˈwɒtsən/
- Language: English, Scots

Origin
- Language: Middle English
- Origin: 'son of Wat or Watt'
- Meaning: short form of Walter

Other names
- Variant forms: Watts, Wattis

Watson is a patronymic surname. In 2015, Watson was the 46th most common surname in England and the 19th most common in Scotland. See also Clan Watson.

== A ==
- Aaron Watson (born 1977), American singer
- Abigail Watson (1685–1752), Irish Quaker minister
- Adam Watson (1914–2007), British international relations theorist and researcher
- Adam Watson (scientist) (1930–2019), Scottish scientist
- A. J. Watson (1924–2014), American automotive engineer
- Alana Watson, English musician
- Albert Watson (disambiguation), multiple people
- Alberta Watson (1955–2015), Canadian actress
- Alex Watson (disambiguation), multiple people
- Alexander Watson (disambiguation), multiple people
- Alan Watson, Allen Watson or Allan Watson, multiple people
- Almyra Maynard Watson (1917–2018), American military nurse
- Alonzo Watson (1893–1937), African American Communist and Spanish Civil War volunteer
- Amelia Watson (1856–1934), American watercolorist
- Amelia Watson (streamer), Virtual YouTuber
- Andrew Watson (disambiguation), multiple people
- Andy Watson (disambiguation), multiple people
- Angela Watson (born 1975), American actress
- Angus Watson (entrepreneur) (1874–1961), British businessman, grocer, and philanthropist
- Anthony Watson (disambiguation), multiple people
- Arnold Watson Hutton (1886–1951), Argentine footballer
- Art Watson (1884–1950), American baseball catcher
- Arthur Watson (disambiguation), multiple people
- Austin Watson (born 1986), American professional wrestler better known as Xavier Woods or Consequences Creed
- Austin Watson (born 1992), American ice hockey player

== B ==
- B. B. Watson (1953–2013), American country music singer
- Barrington Watson (1931–2016), Jamaican painter
- Barry Watson (disambiguation), multiple people
- Ben Watson (disambiguation), multiple people
- Blake Watson (born 1999), American football player
- Brad Watson (disambiguation), multiple people
- Bradley C. S. Watson, Canadian-born American political science educator
- Brandon Watson (American football) (born 1995), American football player
- Brook Watson (1735–1807), British merchant, soldier, and Lord Mayor of London
- Bruce Watson (disambiguation), multiple people
- Bryan Watson (disambiguation), multiple people
- Bubba Watson (born 1978), American golfer

== C ==
- Carol Stuart Watson (1931–1986), American illustrator and publisher
- Cecelia Watson (fl. 2010s–2020s), American author and historian
- Chandra Watson (born 1975) of The Watson Twins, American singer
- Charles Watson (disambiguation), multiple people
- Chloe Watson (born 2000), English professional boxer
- Chris Watson (disambiguation), multiple people
- Christian Watson (born 1999), American football player
- Clarence Wayland Watson (1864–1940), United States Senator and coal company executive
- Cleo Watson, British political adviser
- Cliff Watson, English rugby league footballer who played in the 1960s and 1970s for Great Britain, St Helens, and Cronulla-Sutherland
- Cliff Watson (speedway rider), motorcycle speedway rider of the 1940s and 1950s
- Clifford Watson, rugby league footballer who played in the 1960s and 1970s for Keighley and Hunslet
- Clint Watson, Bahamian politician
- Colin Watson (disambiguation), multiple people
- Craig Watson (disambiguation), multiple people

== D ==
- David Watson (disambiguation), multiple people
- Debbie Watson (disambiguation), multiple people
- Dennis Wallace Watson (1914–2008), Canadian-American microbiologist
- Deshaun Watson (born 1995), American football player
- Desmond Watson (born 2003), American football player
- Doc Watson (1923–2012), American musician
- Don Watson, Australian author
- Donald Watson, pioneer vegan

== E ==
- E. L. Grant Watson (1885–1970), writer, anthropologist and biologist
- Earl Watson (born 1979), American basketball player and coach
- Ed Watson (disambiguation), multiple people
- Edith Watson (1861–1943), Canadian photographer
- Edith Watson (police officer) (1888–1966), British suffragist and police officer
- Edward Watson (disambiguation), multiple people
- Edwin Watson (disambiguation), multiple people
- Elizabeth Watson (disambiguation), multiple people
- Ellen Watson (1861–1889), American pioneer of Wyoming
- Emily Watson (born 1967), English actress
- Emma Watson (born 1990), English actress and activist
- Eric Watson (disambiguation), multiple people
- Esther Pearl Watson (born 1973), American cartoonist and author
- Eva Auld Watson (died 1948), American artist

== F ==
- Floyd R. Watson (1872–1974), American physicist and acoustician
- Franco Watson (born 2002), Argentine footballer
- Frank Watson (disambiguation), multiple people
- Fred Watson (born 1944), British astronomer
- Fred Watson (Australian footballer) (1882–1968), Australian rules footballer
- Fred Watson (Scottish footballer), Scottish footballer

== G ==
- G. N. Watson, English mathematician
- Garry Watson (born 1955), English footballer
- Gary Watson (born 1930), British actor
- Gary L. Watson, American philosopher
- Gary Watson (cricketer) (born 1944), South African cricketer
- George Watson (disambiguation), multiple people
- Geoff Watson (born 1945), Football Scout
- Gracie Watson, American folk figure
- Graeme Watson (disambiguation), multiple people
- Gregory Watson, reviver of the Twenty-seventh Amendment to the United States Constitution

== H ==
- Hamish Watson (rugby union) (born 1991), Scottish rugby union player
- Hannah Bunce Watson (1749–1807), American newspaper publisher
- Harold Watson (disambiguation), multiple people
- Harry Watson (disambiguation), multiple people
- Heather Watson (born 1992), British tennis player
- Helen Watson (disambiguation), multiple people
- Henry Watson (disambiguation), multiple people
- Herbert Watson, multiple people
- Homer Watson (1855–1936), Canadian landscape painter

== I ==
- Ian Watson (disambiguation), multiple people
- Indica Watson (born 2010), English actress

== J ==
- Jack Watson (disambiguation), multiple people
- James Watson (disambiguation), multiple people
- Jamie Watson (disambiguation), multiple people
- Jasmine Watson (born 1991), New Zealand artist
- Jaylen Watson (born 1998), American football player
- Jeffrey Watson (disambiguation), multiple people
- Jenny Watson (artist) (born 1951), Australian artist
- Jessica Watson (born 1993), Australian sailor
- Jim Watson (disambiguation), multiple people
- Joan Thelma Watson (1953–2015), Canadian French Horn musician and teacher
- Jobe Watson (born 1985), Australian rules footballer
- John Watson (disambiguation), multiple people
- Jordan Watson (born 1987), English kickboxer
- Joseph Watson (disambiguation), multiple people
- Josh Watson (American football) (born 1996), American football player
- Joshua Watson (1771–1855), settler
- Julia Watson (born 1953), British actress
- Julia Watson (born 1977), Australian-born landscape designer
- Julia Watson (fl. 2026), American literary scholar
- Justin Watson (wide receiver) (born 1995), American football player

== K ==
- Kaetaeta Watson, master weaver from Kiribati
- Kahlil Watson (born 2003), American baseball player
- Katy Watson (born 2005), English footballer
- Keith Watson (disambiguation), multiple people
- Kenneth Watson (disambiguation), multiple people

== L ==
- Lachlan Watson, American actor
- Larry Watson (disambiguation), multiple people
- Leigh Watson (born 1975) of The Watson Twins, American singer
- Leroy Watson (disambiguation), multiple people
- Lewis Watson (disambiguation), multiple people
- Liam Watson (disambiguation), multiple people
- Lisa Watson (born 1969), Falkland Islands journalist
- Louis H. Watson (1907–1936), American bridge player
- Lucy Watson (journalist) (born 2005), English journalist
- Lucy Watson (footballer) (born 2003), English footballer
- Luman Watson (1790–1834), Cincinnati clockmaker
- Lyall Watson (1935–2008), South African writer, botanist, zoologist, biologist, anthropologist and ethologist

== M ==
- Mabel Madison Watson (1872–1952), American composer
- Mando Watson, British paediatrician
- Mark Watson (disambiguation), multiple people
- Marvin Watson (born 1976), American rapper better known by his stage name Messy Marv
- Mary Watson (disambiguation), multiple people
- Matthew Watson (disambiguation), multiple people
- Maureen Thelma Watson (1925–1994), Rhodesian politician
- Maurice Watson (born 1993), American basketball player
- Max Watson (born 1996), Swedish footballer
- Michael Watson (disambiguation), multiple people
- Moray Watson (1928–2017), English actor

== N ==
- Nathaniel Watson (born 2000), American football player
- Niall Watson (born 2000), English professional footballer
- Nicholas Watson (born 1977), writer and filmmaker
- Nicholas Watson (academic), English-Canadian medievalist
- Nicolás Watson (born 1998), Argentine footballer
- Nolan Watson (born 1979), Canadian businessman and philanthropist

== P ==
- Patrick Watson (disambiguation), multiple people
- Paul Watson (disambiguation), multiple people
- Paula Watson (1927–2003), American singer
- Percival Watson (1881–1959), Australian Congregationalist minister
- Peter Watson (disambiguation), multiple people
- Peyton Watson (born 2002), American basketball player
- Phebe Watson (1876–1964), South Australian educator and union activist

== Q ==
- Quintus et Ultimus Watson (1874–1929), Texas politician

== R ==
- Ralph Watson (1936–2021), English actor
- Raymond Watson (disambiguation), multiple people
- Reatha Dale Watson, birth name of Barbara La Marr, American actress
- Rebecca Watson, a skeptical blogger and podcast host who founded the Skepchick blog
- Reg Watson, Australian television producer
- Regina Watson (1845–1913) German-American composer, pianist and teacher
- Richard Watson (disambiguation), multiple people
- Robert Watson (disambiguation), multiple people
- Rodney Watson, American basketball coach
- Rory Watson (born 1996), English footballer
- Russell Watson, English tenor
- Ruth Watson, English hotelier, broadcaster and food writer
- Ruth Watson, New Zealand artist
- Ryan Watson (disambiguation), multiple people

== S ==
- Sam Watson (disambiguation), multiple people
- Scott Watson, New Zealander convicted of murder
- Sereno Watson, American botanist
- Shane Watson, former Australian cricketer
- Shayne Watson (born 1982), Australian professional baseball player and coach
- Sheila Watson (disambiguation), multiple people
- Stanley Alvin Watson (1893–1962), Canadian soldier and educator
- Steve Watson (disambiguation), multiple people
- Summer Watson, singer
- Susan Kelechi Watson, American Actress of Jamaican parents
- Sydney Watson (1903–1991), English church musician

== T ==
- Terrell Watson (born 1993), American football player
- Terrence Watson (born 1987), American-Israeli basketball player
- Thomas Watson (disambiguation), multiple people
- Tim Watson, Australian rules footballer
- Tom Watson (1932–2001), Scottish actor
- Toni Watson (born 2000), Australian singer known professionally as Tones and I
- Travis Watson (born 1981), American professional basketball player
- Tre Watson (born 2002), American football player
- Tricia Watson, Barbadian politician

== W ==
- Walter L. "Mother" Watson (1865–1898), Major League Baseball pitcher
- Wayde Watson, Bahamian politician
- Wesley Watson, American boxer
- Willard Watson (1921–1995), African-American folk artist from Caddo Parish, Louisiana
- William Watson (disambiguation), multiple people
- Wingfield W. Watson, (1828–1922), religious leader

== Fictional characters ==
- Randy Watson, a character in the 1988 American romantic comedy film Coming to America
- Winker Watson, titular character of a British comic strip
- Dr. Watson, a character in the Sherlock Holmes stories by Sir Arthur Conan Doyle
- Mary Jane Watson, character in the original Spider-Man comic books by Stan Lee
