= Joseph Watson =

Joseph or Joe Watson may refer to:

- Joseph Watson (mayor) (1784–1841), American local political figure who served as mayor of Philadelphia, 1824–1828
- Joseph Watson, 1st Baron Manton (1873–1922), English industrialist; chairman of soap firm Joseph Watson and Sons Ltd.
- Joseph Watson (academic), Irish scholar; professor of Modern Irish at University College, Dublin
- Joe Watson (American football) (1925–2006), American football player
- Joe Watson (soccer) (1952–2000), Scottish-born Australian international footballer
- Joe Watson (English footballer) (1906/1907 – after 1928), English footballer for Darlington
- Joe Watson (folklorist) (1881–after 1975), Australian folk singer, songwriter and traveling musician
- Joseph Watson (footballer), Australian rules footballer
- Joe Watson (ice hockey) (born 1943), Canadian hockey player
- Joseph Watson (teacher) (1765–1829), English teacher of the deaf, and writer on teaching the deaf

== See also ==
- Joseph Watson Sidebotham (1857–1925), British politician and colliery owner
- Watson (surname)
