= George Watson =

George Watson may refer to:

== Politicians ==
- George Watson (mayor) (1852–1923), mayor of Brisbane
- George Watson (MP) (1768–1824), MP for Canterbury
- George Harvey Watson (1879–1947), politician in Saskatchewan, Canada

== Sportsmen ==
- George Watson (Australian rules footballer) (1922–1978), Australian rules footballer for Fitzroy
- George Watson (baseball) (1881–?), American baseball player
- George Watson (bowls), Irish lawn bowls player
- George Watson (cricketer, born 1855) (1855–1884), New Zealand cricketer
- George Watson (cricketer, born 1907) (1907–1974), Kent CCC cricketer
- George Watson (cyclist) (1891–1938), Canadian Olympic cyclist
- George Watson (footballer, born 1905) (1905–1991), English football goalkeeper
- George Watson (rugby) (1885–1961), Australian rugby footballer
- George Watson (umpire) (died 1948), Australian Test cricket umpire

== Artists ==
- George Watson (painter) (1767–1837), Scottish painter
- George Spencer Watson (1869–1934), English portrait artist
- George Watson (1892–1977), photographer in California

== Military ==
- George Watson (Medal of Honor) (1915–1943), US soldier awarded the Medal of Honor in 1997 for actions during World War II
- George Watson (Royal Navy officer) (1827–1897), British Admiral
- George Watson (United States Army Air Corps) (1920–2017), supply sergeant and support personnel for the Tuskegee Airmen
- George Lennox Watson (1851–1904), Scottish naval architect

== Others ==
- George Watson (accountant) (1654–1723), Scottish accountant and the founder of George Watson's College in Edinburgh
- George Watson (scholar) (1927–2013), Fellow at St. John's College, Cambridge University
- George Earl Watson (1897–1975), American educator
- George Leo Watson (1909–1988), English mathematician
- George Mackie Watson (1860–1948), Scottish architect
- G. N. Watson (1886–1965), English mathematician
- George Whyte-Watson (1908–1974), Scottish surgeon

== See also ==
- George Watson's College, a co-educational independent day school in Scotland
- George Watson-Taylor (1771–1841), MP
