= Frederick Watson =

Frederick or Fred Watson may refer to:

- Frederick Beilby Watson (1773–1852), British courtier
- Frederick Watson (artist), Canadian fashion illustrator and painter
- Fred Watson (Australian footballer) (1882–1968), Australian rules footballer
- Fred Watson (Scottish footballer) (1888–1917), Scottish footballer
- Fred Watson (Frederick Garnett Watson, born 1944), English-born astronomer and popular scientist in Australia
- Frederick Watson, pseudonym of John Leslie (director) (1945–2010), American pornographic film actor-director-producer

== See also ==
- Frederic Watson (1840–1885), English cricketer and British Army officer
