= Andrew Watson =

Andrew Watson may refer to:

- Andrew Watson (bishop) (1961–2026), Anglican bishop of Guildford
- Andrew Watson (British Army officer) (1927–2022), British general
- Andrew Watson (cricketer) (born 1955), Australian cricketer
- Andrew Watson (footballer, born 1856) (1856–1921), Scottish footballer for Queen's Park, national team
- Andrew Watson (footballer, born 1894), Scottish footballer
- Andrew Watson (footballer, born 1967), English footballer for Huddersfield Town, Exeter City, Mossley and Emley
- Andrew Watson (racing driver) (born 1995), Northern Irish racing driver
- Andrew Lowe Watson (1958–2021), English composer
- Andrew Murray Watson (1930–2024), Canadian economic historian
- Andrew Naismith Watson (born 1937), Canadian politician
- Andy Watson (scientist) (born 1952), British marine and atmospheric scientist
- Andrew Watson, a character on Neighbours

== See also ==
- Andrew Watson Myles (1884–1970), Canadian politician
- Andrew Watson Armour III (1908–1991), of the meat-packing family
- Andy Watson (disambiguation)
