= Admiral Watson =

Admiral Watson may refer to:

- Anthony Watson (admiral) (born 1949), U.S. Navy rear admiral
- Bertram Watson (1887–1976), British Royal Navy vice admiral
- Burges Watson (1846–1902), British Royal Navy rear admiral
- Charles Watson (Royal Navy officer) (1714–1757), British Royal Navy vice admiral
- Dymock Watson (1904–1988), British Royal Navy vice admiral
- Fischer Watson (1884–1960), British Royal Navy rear admiral
- George Watson (Royal Navy officer) (1827–1897), British Royal Navy admiral
- Hugh Watson (1872–1954), British Royal Navy admiral
- James A. Watson (born 1956), U.S. Coast Guard rear admiral
- John C. Watson (1842–1923), U.S. Navy admiral
- Philip Watson (1919–2009), British Royal Navy vice admiral
