= Louis Watson =

Louis Watson may refer to:

- Louis H. Watson (1906–1936), American contract bridge player and writer
- Louis L. Watson (1895–?), American college football player and coach

== See also ==
- Lewis Watson (disambiguation)
