= Stanley Watson =

Stanley or Stan Watson may refer to:

- Stanley Watson (neuroscientist), American neuroscientist
- Stanley Alvin Watson (1893–1962), Canadian soldier and educator
- Stan Watson (footballer) (1937–2014), English footballer
- Stan Watson (politician), American politician in Georgia
