= Cliff Watson (disambiguation) =

Cliff Watson (1940–2018) was an English professional rugby league footballer.

It may also refer to:

- Clifford Watson, English rugby league footballer who played in the 1960s and 1970s
- Cliff Watson (speedway rider) (1916–1989), Australian international speedway motorcyclist
