= Victoria Hayward (journalist) =

Bermudian-born journalist and travel writer (1876–1956)

- Born: 1876; Bermuda
- Died: 1956 (aged 79–80); Cape Cod, United States
- Other name: Queenie
- Occupations: Journalist, travel writer
- Notable work: Romantic Canada (1922)
- Partner: Edith Watson

Victoria Hayward (1876–1956) was a Bermudian-born journalist and travel writer. Hayward is credited with coining the term "Canadian mosaic".

== Early life ==
Victoria Hayward was born in 1876 in Bermuda. At the age of 16, Hayward left Bermuda and moved to New York to teach math at a private boys' school. About ten years later, she returned to Bermuda and pursued journalism.

== Career ==
Hayward's writings were widely published in Canadian magazines and often focused on Canadian culture, though she was not Canadian. Hayward and photographer Edith Watson spent three summers in the late 1910s and early 1920s living with the Doukhobors in Saskatchewan and British Columbia. The two recorded Doukhobor life and presented it to the public first in their 1919 Fort Wayne Journal Gazette article "Doukhobor Farms Supply All Needs" and later in Romantic Canada.

In 1922, Hayward published the travel book Romantic Canada. The book was based on her recent travels across southern Canada, though it focuses largely on Canada's maritime provinces. In Romantic Canada, she described Canada's culture, both in terms of ethnicities and architecture, as a "mosaic". Hayward is credited with coining the phrase "Canadian mosaic". Romantic Canada was illustrated and contained photography by Watson.

== Personal life ==
Hayward met photographer Edith Watson in Bermuda in 1911. The two would later live in Connecticut when not travelling. Though both were officially closeted, their surviving letters indicate they were romantically involved. Hayward left Connecticut after Watson's death in 1943, relocating to a cottage in Cape Cod, where she died in 1956.

== Bibliography ==
- Romantic Canada (1922)
