= Edward Watson =

Edward Watson may refer to:

- Edward Watson (died 1617), MP for Stamford
- Edward Watson (dancer) (born 1976), dancer with the Royal Ballet
- Edward Watson (footballer) (1901–1986), English footballer
- Edward Watson, 2nd Baron Rockingham (1630–1689), English landowner and peer
- Edward Watson, Viscount Sondes (1686–1722), English politician, MP for Canterbury
- Edward B. Watson (judge) (1844–1915), chief justice of the Oregon Supreme Court
- Edward B. Watson (historian) (1906–1991), American architectural and transportation historian, photographer, and collector
- Edward H. Watson (1874–1942), United States Navy officer
- Edward M. Watson (1874–1938), justice of the Supreme Court of Hawaii
- Edward William Watson (1859–1936), professor of ecclesiastical history
- Edward Yerbury Watson (died 1897), English entomologist
- Ted Watson (Edward George Watson), English footballer

== See also ==
- Ed Watson (disambiguation)
- Eddie Watson (born 1980), Liberian-born Ghanaian actor and producer
