= Brad Watson =

Brad Watson may refer to:

- Brad Watson (ice hockey) (born 1961), National Hockey League referee
- Brad Watson (writer) (1955–2020), American writer
- Bradley C. S. Watson, Canadian-born American political science educator
