= Richard Watson =

Richard Watson may refer to:

- Richard Watson (author) (born 1961), English writer and lecturer known for his books on the future
- Richard Watson (bishop of Burnley) (1923–1998), Bishop of Burnley
- Richard Watson (bishop of Llandaff) (1737–1816), Anglican clergyman and academic
- Richard Watson (cricketer) (1921–1987), English cricketer
- Billy Watson (footballer, born 1890) (1890–1955), born Richard Watson, English footballer with Burnley and England
- Richard Watson (Methodist) (1781–1833), British Methodist theologian
- Richard Watson (philosopher) (1931–2019), American philosopher, speleologist and author
- Richard Watson (politician) (1800–1852), British Member of Parliament for Canterbury and Peterborough
- Richard Watson (singer) (1903–1968), actor and singer, especially with D'Oyly Carte Opera Company
- Richard S. Watson (1902–1987), bishop of the Episcopal Diocese of Utah
- Richard J. Watson (born 1946), American artist
- Richard Millar Watson (1860–1925), Scottish tennis player
- Richard Watson (poet) (1833–1891), English poet from County Durham
