= Michael Watson (disambiguation) =

Michael Watson (born 1965) is an English boxer.

Michael or Mike Watson may also refer to:

- Michael Watson (athlete) (born 1958), Bermudan middle-distance runner
- Michael Watson (cyclist) (born 1938), Hong Kong Olympic cyclist
- Michael Watson (lacrosse) (born 1974), American lacrosse player
- Michael Watson (Mississippi politician) (born 1977), 36th Secretary of State of Mississippi
- Michael Watson (Virginia politician) (born 1961), Virginia politician
- Michael H. Watson (born 1956), U.S. federal judge
- Mike Watson, Baron Watson of Invergowrie (born 1949), Scottish politician and peer
- Mike Watson (poker player) (born 1984), Canadian professional poker player
- Mike Watson, bassist for American metal band Dangerous Toys
- Mike Watson (musician), (born 1946), bassist for ABBA
- Mick Watson (born 1966), New Zealand businessman
- Mike Watson (American football), American football coach
- Mike Watson, character in 100 Feet
- B. Michael Watson (born 1949), United Methodist Church bishop
- Michael Hughes Watson, Christian musician and lead vocalist for Above the Golden State

== See also ==
- Watson (surname)
