= Jeffrey Watson =

Jeffrey Watson may refer to:

- Jeff Watson (designer) (born 1973), Canadian game designer and professor
- Jeff Watson (journalist) (1942–2023), Australian journalist and documentary maker
- Jeff Watson (politician) (born 1971), Canadian politician
- Jeffrey Watson (actor), Canadian actor
- Jeff Watson (guitarist) (born 1956), guitarist for rock band Night Ranger
- Jeffrey Watson (priest) (1939–2021), Anglican Archdeacon of Ely

== See also ==
- Geoffrey Watson (1921–1998), Australian statistician
- Watson (surname)
