= Brian Watson (disambiguation) =

Brian Watson (born 1971) is an American entrepreneur and political activist.

Brian Watson may also refer to:

- Brian Watson (billiards player) in 2011 World Billiards Championship
- Brian Watson (writer), see Science Fiction & Fantasy Translation Awards
- Brian Watson, American musician in Soulpreacher

== See also ==
- Bryan Watson (disambiguation)
