= Bob Wade (artist) =

American artist (1943–2019)

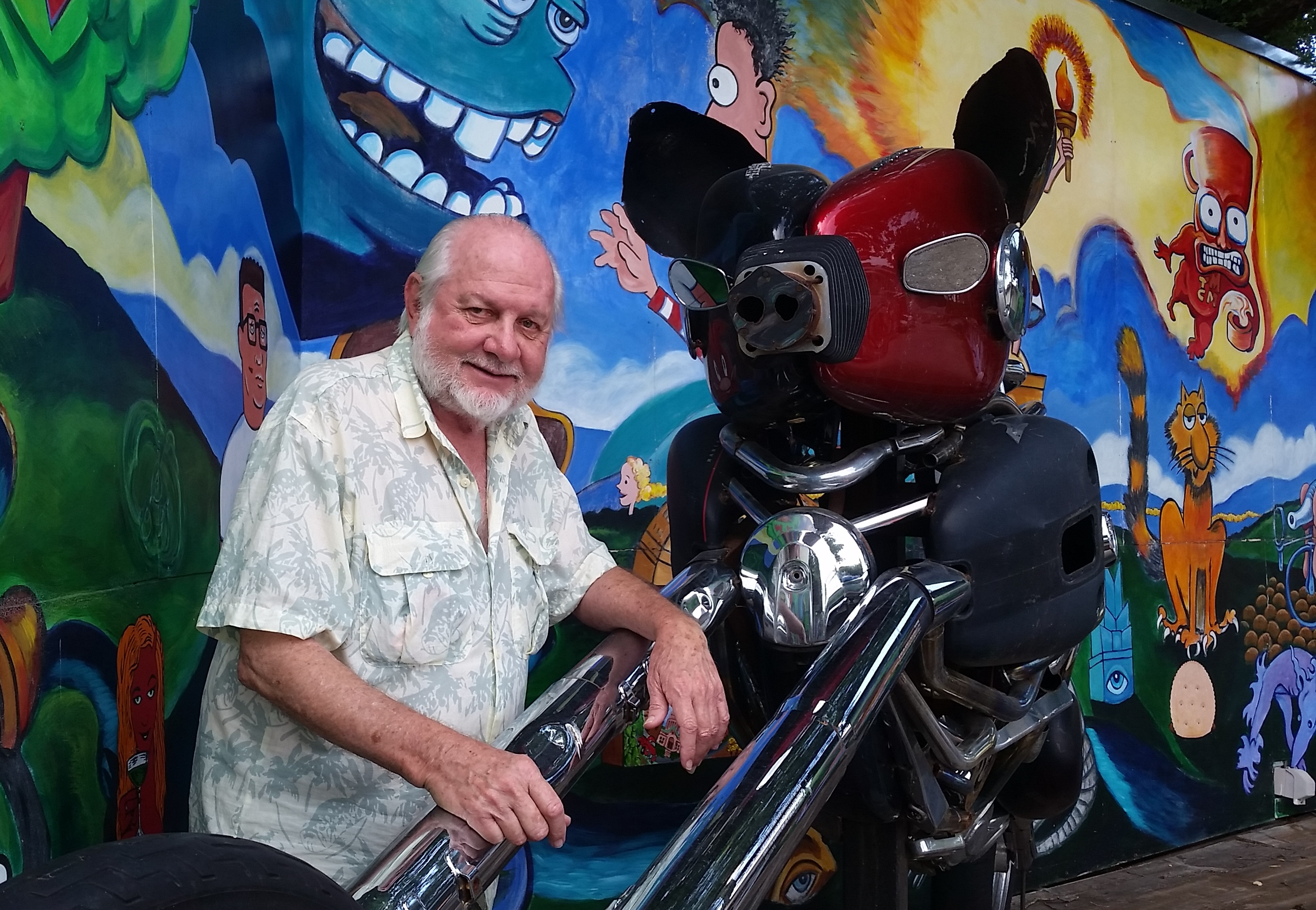
Wade with HOG sculpture

Bob "Daddy-O" Wade (January 6, 1943 – December 23, 2019) was an American artist, based in Austin, Texas, who helped shape the 1970s Texas Cosmic Cowboy counterculture. He is best known for creating whimsical out-sized sculptures of Texas symbols. He was known for his uninhibited style and received attention as a serious artist in some art circles. Wade made hand-tinted large photo-emulsion canvases of vintage photographs, some of which were exhibited at the Whitney Museum of American Art. Wade built a 40-foot-long (12 m) giant, 2,600 pound iguana, known as "Iggy", which sat on top of the Lone Star Cafe in New York City from 1978 to 1989. "Iggy" changed owners a few times after the Lone Star Cafe closed and now resides atop the Fort Worth Zoo's Burnett Animal Health Science Center and greets visitors driving into the zoo grounds.

== Early life ==
Robert Schrope Wade was born in Austin, Texas on January 6, 1943. Son of a hotel manager, Wade grew up in several Texas cities. This early hotel life contributed to Wade's interests in the American road and highway kitsch.

As a boy he was able to visit with his cowboy hero, Roy Rogers, who was a first cousin of his mother. During high school in El Paso, Wade joined a car club and would go south of the border to Juarez to enlist skilled technicians to customize his hot rod.

When Bob arrived Austin in 1961 to attend the University of Texas he was driving a decade-old, customized Ford Crown Victoria hot rod. His slicked back hair, the hot rod and his El Paso style earned him the nickname of "Daddy-O" from his Kappa Sigma His fraternity brothers.

He studied art under Charles Umlauf and others who were focused on sculpture. In addition to his formal studies, Wade learned from the example of several Austin artists, including William Lester, Robert Levers, and Everett Spruce. Upon graduation from UT, Wade earned a Masters in painting at the University of California at Berkeley. There the artist connected his border sensibilities to the developing West coast Funk art pioneered by Bay Area curator and art historian Peter Selz.

== College professor to Texas funk ==
Following his time in Berkeley, Wade returned to Texas to make art and teach in Waco, Dallas, and the University of North Texas, successively. Wade helped create a small art community in the Oak Cliff area of Dallas with artists, George Green, Jim Roche, and Jack Mims. They became known as the Oak Cliff Four. Together they booked gallery shows and a group show at the Tyler Museum. In 1971, Dave Hickey’s South Texas Sweet Funk exhibition at Austin's St. Edward's University catalyzed the art scene developing out of the Texas counterculture, bringing the Oak Cliff Four together with Jim Franklin, Gilbert Shelton, Luis Jiménez, and others. Wade soon turned to a new process with his work in photo-emulsion canvases, which quickly drew attention in the larger art world. One piece, ‘Gettin’ It on Near Cedar Hill’, a depiction of two heifers in a rather indelicate position, appeared in Art Forum in 1971, and was reviewed by Robert Pincus-Witten. Continuing this technique, Wade transferred vintage and Texas themed photos to photo-emulsion canvases on a large scale and applied color. These works include photos such as Mexican revolutionaries, a cowboy band, Texas boys and their guns, Yaquis, and his most well known, the 10' wide canvas, ‘Cowgirls on Harleys’.

As part of the American Bicentennial celebration Wade installed a U.S. map the size of a football field in Dallas. Constructed from plywood, concrete, and earth, the map featured miniature oil wells, billboards, skyscrapers, and replicas of the Great Lakes and the Mississippi River. Visible from planes leaving DFW International Airport, the work was covered by People magazine and made Wade famous. In 1976, Wade and folk artist Willard Watson built "a three-dimensional, football-field-size map of the United States near the LBJ freeway.

Wade's teaching career ended in 1977 when he turned his full attention to making his art. In 1979 Wade began a series of canvases that would expand this technique. Wade decided to enlarge a 1922 postcard of cowgirls onto a photo emulsion canvas and hand-tint it in vivid colors. This accentuated the details in the women's faces and clothes. This was Wade's tribute to the American cowgirl, a subject that entered a revival about that time. A book of these works, Cowgirls, was published in 1995.

=== Ambassador of Texas culture ===
Wade served as an art ambassador, serving up Texas culture for art audiences nationally and internationally. In 1976 Wade returned to the San Francisco Bay Area to recreate a Texas honky-tonk in the midst of the San Francisco Museum of Modern Art, cantilevered a taxidermied rodeo horse to a wall in the Tex-Lax exhibition at Cal State-Los Angeles, and turned the Lone Star state itself into a roadside attraction for the French with his Texas Mobile Home Museum in the Paris Biennale of 1977.

A 1976 documentary by Kenneth Harrison, 'Jackelope', focused on Wade, George Green, and James Surls. In the documentary Wade goes on a road trip across the state collecting materials for a display of Texas culture in a New York art museum. Another documentary on Bob Wade's career, "Too High, Too Long and Too Wide," is by New York filmmaker Karen Dinitz and features his road trip across Texas in his Iguanamobile.

In 1979, Wade created a pair of giant cowboy boots for a temporary public art installation in Washington DC. He had been selected to create a large sculpture by the Washington Project for the Arts. He chose cowboy boots because in his words, "Western chic was a huge trend". Completed using donated and scavenged materials, the boots stood nearly 40 feet tall and were installed on an empty lot near the White House at the northwest corner of 12th and G Streets NW. In January 1980, when the boots were due to be taken down, a property management company requested the boots for a shopping mall in Texas. The boots were moved to San Antonio's North Star Mall, where they stand today and are a beloved landmark. According to the Guinness World Record, this sculpture holds the record for the largest cowboy boot structure.

== Later times ==
Until his death in 2019, Bob Wade continued to produce his unique art. An example is his 2006 ‘Kinky Mobile’, a small tear drop trailer with a cowboy hat on top and a 3’ cigar sticking out the front, coinciding with Kinky Friedman’s run for Texas governor. Wade celebrated the installation of his iconic Iguana at the Fort Worth Zoo in June 2010, documented in these photos. A retrospective of his work was exhibited at the South Austin Museum of Popular Culture in the fall of 2009.

Wade lived and worked in Austin, Texas. Wade's work can be found at The Grove, a public art program at Waterside, in Fort Worth. Installed in 2016, this outdoor sculpture celebrates the area's history and is made from re-purposed amusement rides and playground equipment.

The Texas Book Festival chose Wade's “Let ’er Rip,” an image of a vintage cowgirl riding an oversized, bucking Texas horned frog, for its 2020 festival poster. During his last months of life Wade collaborated with over forty artists and writers on “Daddy-O's Book of Big-Ass Art”, a book featuring images and tales of more than a hundred of his most famous pieces. It was published ten months after his death in November, 2020.

== Personal life ==
Wade was married twice, first to Sue Immel, ending in divorce. He met his second wife, Lisa Sherman, in 1982. By 1989 they were married and had a daughter, Rachel.

== Public art ==
Wade's public art can be found mainly in Texas. The following is a partial list.

- Funny Farm Family – Located at the Art Center, 1300 College Dr., McLennan Community College, Waco, Texas. A number of colorful bomb casings and steel.
- Dancing Frogs, exit 374, I-35 East, Carl's Corner, Texas, north of Hillsboro, Texas. The six frogs were originally created for the Tango nightclub in Dallas. After the club closed three of the frogs were sold to Chuy's in Houston and three stand outside the Carl's Corner gas station.
- Dinosaur Bob, National Center for Children's Illustrated Literature, 102 Cedar St., Abilene, Texas. The sculpture is a rendition of the children's book character. The dinosaur has Volkswagen beetle in its mouth.
- Giant Prickly Pear Cactus, roof of Leal's Mexican Restaurant, 1010 W. American Blvd., Muleshoe, Texas.
- World's Largest Cowboy Boots, North Star Mall, Loop 410 at San Pedro, San Antonio, Texas. The 40-foot-tall (12 m) boots were originally installed near the White House in Washington D.C.
- Junkyard Dog, Alamo City Inc., 1201 Somerset Rd., San Antonio, Texas. The base for the dog is a 1966 Plymouth Fury standing on end.
- Giant Sixshooter, Humphreys Gun Shop, 124 E. Garfield Ave., Del Rio, The sixshooter is made of a barrel, stove pipe, and stucco. The gun shop covered the costs and uses the sculpture in its Internet ads.
- Smokesax, Billy Blues, 6025 Richmond Ave., Houston. The saxophone is constructed from a Volkswagen body, oil field pipe, and a surfboard for the mouthpiece. After Billy Blues closed, it was donated to Houston's Orange Show Center for Visual Art.
- El Salsero atop La Salsa restaurant, 22800 West Pacific Coast Highway, Malibu, California. Wade transformed a 1950s giant fiberglass Muffler Man who held a giant hamburger into La Salsa Man, when the restaurant below became La Salsa in 1987. A mustache was added and a sombrero was fashioned out of the top hamburger bun. A serape was attached to his shoulder and his boots were painted to look like huarache sandals. The bottom bun became a platter holding a beer bottle and some Mexican food.
- Lone Star Cafe Iguana A 40-foot-long (12 m), 12-foot-high (3.7 m) iguana that topped the roof of the Lone Star Cafe in New York City from 1978 to 1989. It was acquired by the Fort Worth Zoo and installed on the roof of their animal hospital in June 2010.

Other works include giant armadillos, dancing frogs, urethane-foamed World's Biggest Cowboy Boots originally installed near the White House, a 70-foot-tall (21 m) saxophone and a New Orleans Saints helmet created from a Volkswagen beetle, currently atop the Shoal Creek Saloon in Austin, Texas.

== Awards and recognition ==
Wade received three National Endowment of the Arts grants and has been included in Biennial exhibitions in Paris and in New Orleans. His work has been part of the Whitney Museum of American Art in New York and in the collections of the Houston Museum of Art, the Austin Museum of Art, the Chase Manhattan Bank, the Menil Collection, and AT&T. Wade was dubbed a "pioneer of Texas Funk and connoisseur of Southwestern kitsch," by the Fort Worth Star Telegram.

== Bibliography ==
- Cowgirls, Layton, Utah, Gibbs Smith Publisher, 1995. Experimentation with color enhancement of black and white vintage photographs.
- Ridin’ and Wreckin’, Salt Lake City, Gibbs Smith, 1996. Hand-tinted photos of rodeo riders from 1910 through the 1930s.
- Daddy-O: Iguana Heads & Texas Tales, St. Martin's Press, 1995, ISBN 0-312-13459-2
- Daddy-O's Book of Big-Ass Art, Texas A&M University Press, 2020, ISBN 978-1623498696
- "Big D," Newsweek, Vol. 80, Iss. 6, (Aug 7, 1972): 56-57.
- Leigh Arnold, "Oak Cliff: Dallas' Left Bank." DallasSITES: Charting Contemporary Art, 1963 to Present. Dallas Museum of Art, 2014.
