= Anthony Watson =

Anthony Watson may refer to:

== Sports ==
- Anthony Watson (shot putter) (1910–1970), English athlete
- Anthony Watson (long jumper) (1941–2021), American Olympic athlete
- Anthony Watson (basketball) (born 1964), American former basketball player
- Anthony Watson (rugby union) (born 1994), English rugby union player
- Anthony Watson (skeleton racer) (born 1989), American-born skeleton racer who competed on behalf of Jamaica
- Tony Watson (born 1985), American baseball player

== Others ==
- Anthony Watson (admiral) (born 1949), American naval officer
- Anthony Watson (bishop) (died 1605), English bishop
- Anthony Watson (businessman), former CIO of Nike and Barclays, LGBT rights activist
- Anthony Reynard Watson (1957–2021), American soul singer
- Anthony Watson-Gandy (1919–1952), scholar in London

== See also ==
- Anton Watson (born 2000), American basketball player
- Antonio Watson (born 2001), Jamaican sprinter
- Toni Watson (flourished 21st century), Australian singer
