= Mark Watson (disambiguation) =

Mark Watson (born 1980) is an English stand-up comedian and novelist.

Mark Watson may also refer to:

- Mark Watson (archaeologist) (1906–1979), British diplomat and archaeologist
- Mark Watson (Australian footballer) (born 1960), Australian rules football player and coach
- Mark Watson (baseball) (born 1974), American former Major League Baseball pitcher
- Mark Watson (economist) (born 1952), professor of econometrics at Princeton University
- Mark Watson (footballer, born 1973), retired English football forward
- Mark Watson (military officer), commodore, Royal Canadian Navy, director general of Morale and Welfare Services
- Mark Watson (sculptor) (born 1949), American sculptor
- Mark Watson (soccer, born 1970), Canadian soccer player
- Mark E. Watson III (born 1964), American entrepreneur
- Mark S. Watson (1887–1966), American editor and correspondent
- Mark Watson-Gandy (born 1967), British barrister, UK law professor, author, company chairman, founder of KidsMBA
