= Bruce Watson =

Bruce Watson may refer to:

- Bruce Watson (American guitarist) (born 1959), American guitarist with Foreigner
- Bruce Watson (Scottish guitarist) (born 1961), Canadian-born Scottish guitarist with Big Country
- Bruce Watson (politician) (1910–1988), chairman of the Scottish National Party
- Bruce Watson (songwriter) (born 1956), Australian songwriter
- Bruce Watson (writer) (born 1953), American writer
- E. Bruce Watson (born 1950), American geochemist

== See also ==
- Watson (surname)
