= Margaret Warner Morley =

American educator, biologist, and author (1858–1923)

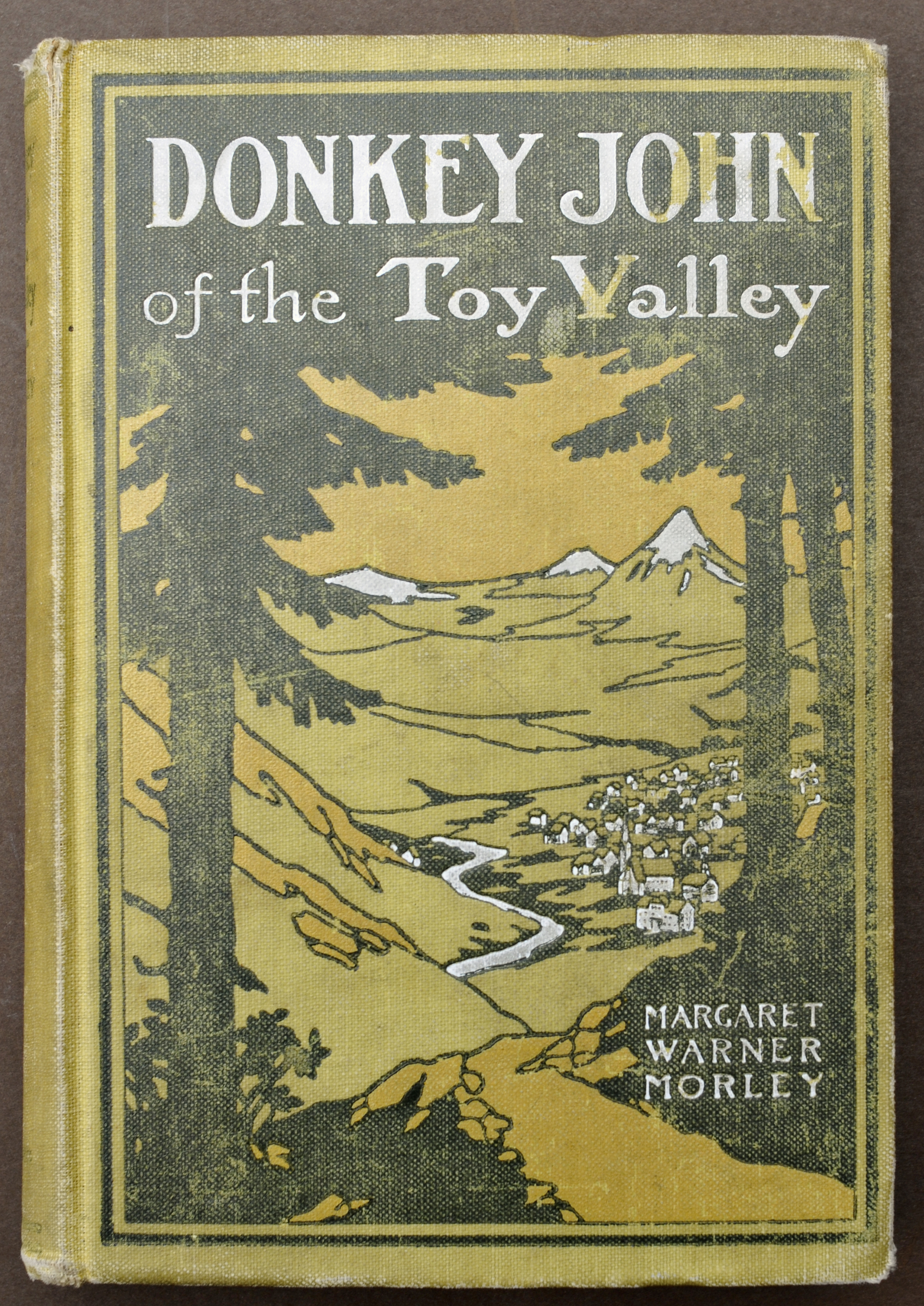
Cover of Donkey John of the toy valley. Chicago A. C. McClurg & Co. 1909

Margaret Warner Morley (February 17, 1858, in Montrose, Iowa – December 12, 1923, in Washington, D.C.) was an American educator, biologist, and author of many children's books on nature and biology.

== Biography ==
Morley grew up in Brooklyn. She studied at State University of New York at Oswego and Hunter College. She continued her biology education at the Armour Institute (now the Illinois Institute of Technology) in Chicago and at the Woods Hole marine laboratory in Massachusetts. She worked as a teacher and was considered an expert in agriculture and beekeeping. She was most well known for her work as an illustrator, photographer, and author of books on nature.

As early as 1890 she visited Tryon, North Carolina with the painter Amelia Watson where she resided in the cottage of playwright William Gillette. She finally acquired her own home in Tryon where she lived for many years.

In one of her many trips she went to Europe to the Val Gardena the valley of toy carvers where she was inspired to write the novel Donkey John of the toy valley.

A collection of Morley's work is held at the Harriet Beecher Stowe Center in Hartford, Connecticut. The collection consists of travel logs and sketchbooks of rural North Carolina, and book manuscripts.

The North Carolina Museum of History owns a collection of original photographs that Morley donated to the museum in 1914.

Morley died on December 12, 1923.

== Drawings ==
Drawings by Morley from the original Val Gardena toys from Donkey John of the Toy Valley:

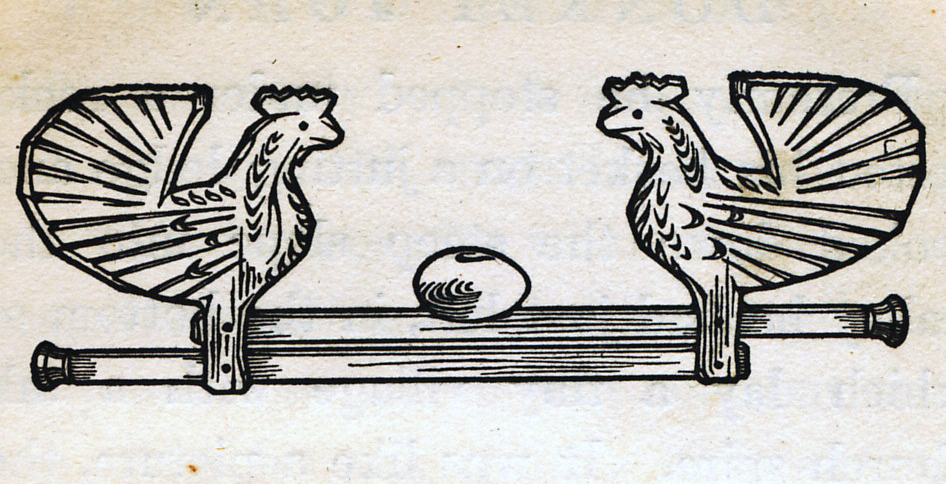

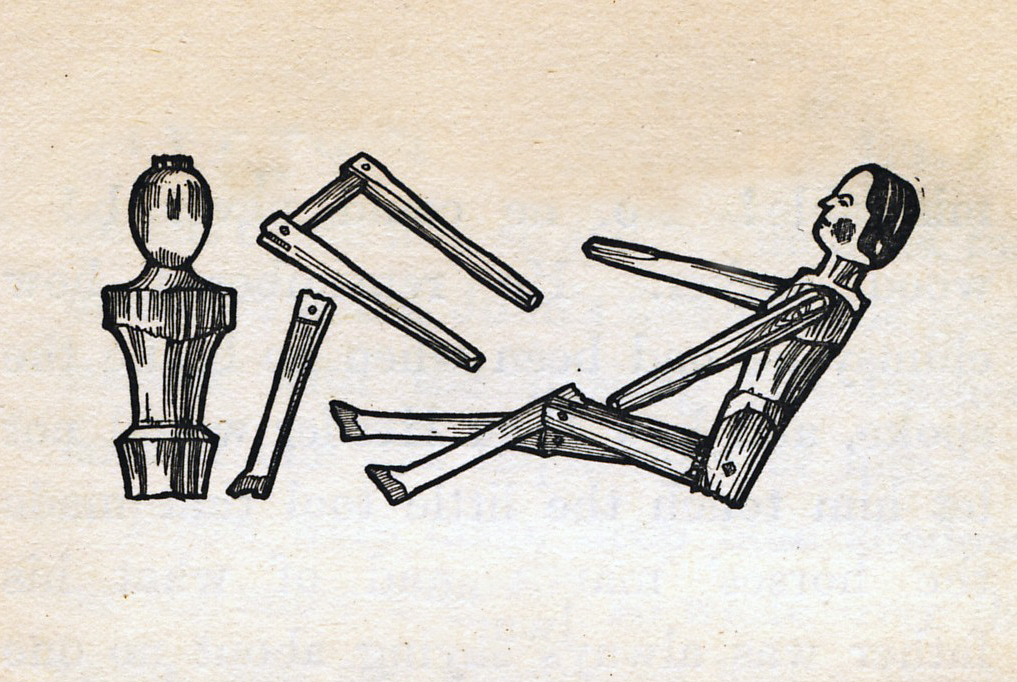

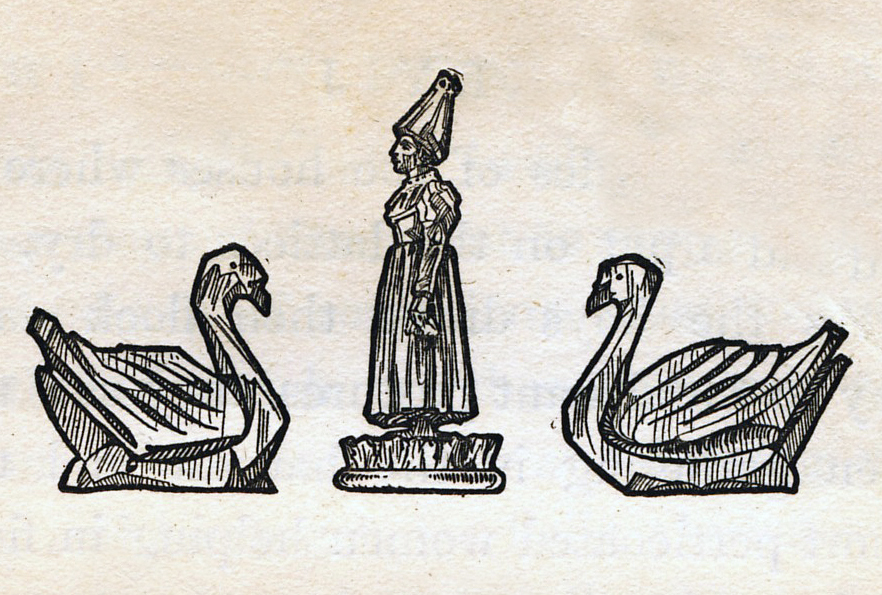

== Writings ==
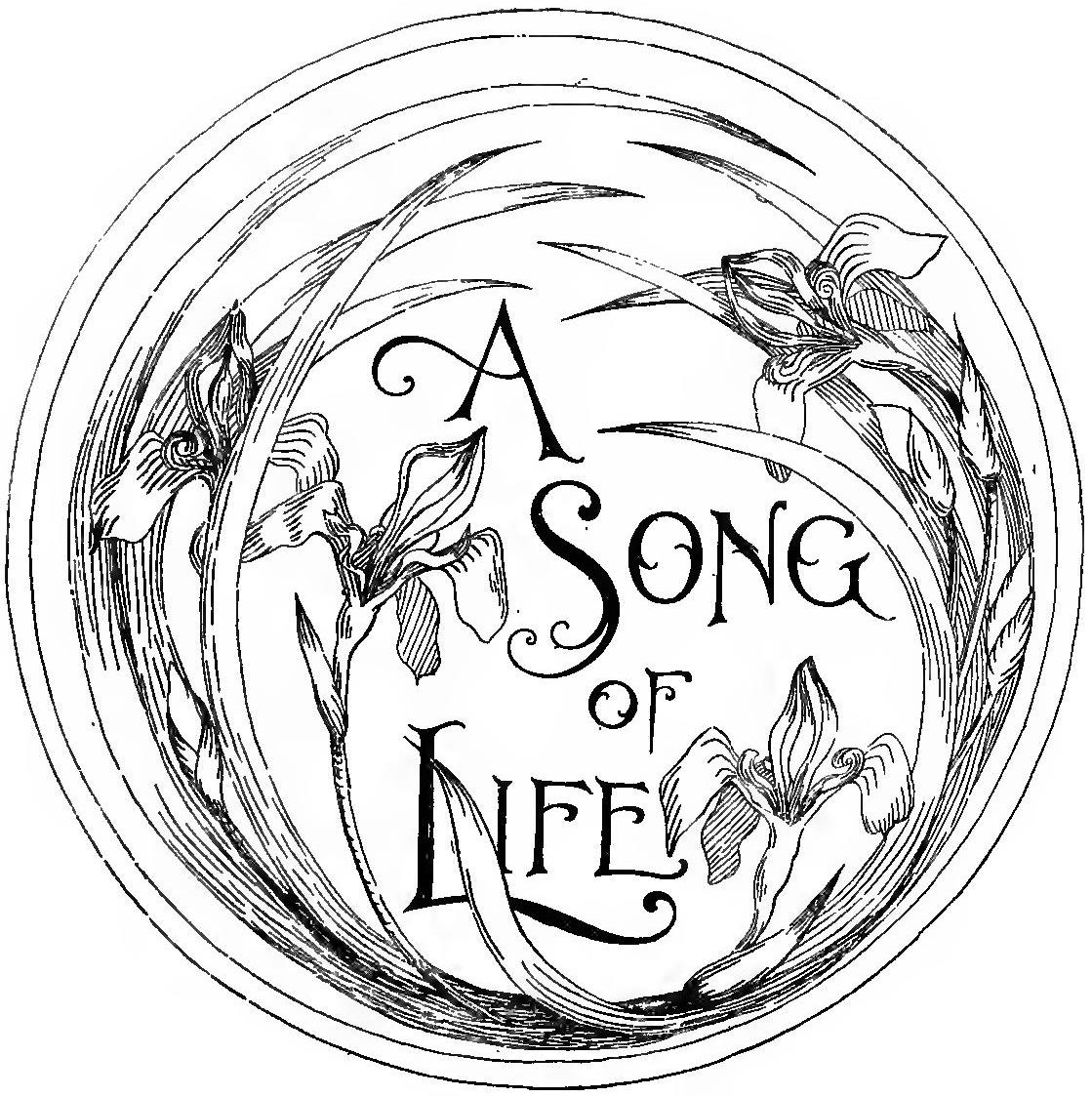
- Iris art, A Song of Life
  Song of Life 1891
- Physical culture 1893
- Flowers and Their Friends 1897
- A few familiar flowers: how to love them at home or in school 1897
- Seed babies 1898
- Little Wanderers 1899
- The Honey Makers 1899
- Down north and up along 1900
- Wasps and their ways 1901
- Insect Folk 1903
- Little Mitchell, the Story of a Mountain Squirrel 1904
- The Renewal of Life: How and When to Tell the Story to the Young 1906
- Donkey John of the toy valley. Chicago A. C. McClurg & Co. 1909
- Grasshopper Land 1910
- The Carolina Mountains, Boston: Houghton Mifflin Co (1913)
- Will o' the wasps 1913
- The Bee People 1914
- the Apple-Tree Sprite 1915
