= Larry Watson =

Larry or Lawrence Watson may refer to:

- Larry Watson (footballer) (born 1957), former Australian rules football player
- Larry Watson (writer) (born 1947), American author of novels, poetry and short stories
- Lawrence Watson (politician) (1917–1990), member of the House of Commons of Canada
- Lawrence "Larry" Watson (born 1952), American educator, singer, songwriter, and activist
