= Joe Watson (English footballer) =

English footballer

Personal information
- Full name: Joseph Watson
- Date of birth: 1907
- Place of birth: Swalwell, County Durham, England
- Height: 5 ft 7 1/2 in (1.71 m)
- Position: Right back

Senior career*
Years	Team	Apps	(Gls)
–	White-le-Head Rangers		
–	Lintz Colliery		
1929	Darlington	11	(0)
- * Club domestic league appearances and goals

Joseph Watson (1907 – after 1928) was an English footballer who played as a right back in the Football League for Darlington. He played non-league football for White-le-Head Rangers and Lintz Colliery, from where he signed professionally with Darlington in February 1929. He made his debut in the Third Division North match against New Brighton on 9 February, taking the place of Walter Holmes, and finished the season, and his Darlington career, with eleven appearances in the league.
