= Mando Watson =

British paediatrician

- Born: London
- Occupation: Child paediatrician
- Employer(s): St Mary's Hospital; Imperial College London
- Known for: Programme for Integrated Child Health (PICH); Connecting Care for Children (CC4C)
- Awards: Royal College of Paediatrics and Child Health (Honorary Fellow)

Mando Watson is a British paediatric consultant, author and researcher. She is known for her work in integrated care services for children, medical education, and health system reform in England. She works as a general paediatrician at St Mary's Hospital and Professor of Practice in Integrated Child Health at Imperial College London.

Her work in the field of paediatrics led her be recognised as an Honorary Fellow by the Royal College of Paediatrics and Child Health. Watson has also been part of national policy discussions on the future of child health.

== Early life & education ==
Watson was born in London and attended North London Collegiate School.

== Career ==
Watson spent much of her career working as a practising doctor, specialised in paediatrics. In the mid-2000s, she served as the consultant paediatrician to Ivan Cameron, the son of former Prime Minister David Cameron. Given the complexity of Ivan’s medical needs, Watson was involved in his care over an extended period. The role attracted public attention due to his father's position as leader of the opposition at the time.

Watson was the co-founder of Connecting Care for Children (CC4C) in West London in 2014. The CC4C model played a fundamental role in rethinking how to connect or support children in primary care with secondary care (specialist) paediatric services. The CC4C subsequently won the Health Service Journal's Acute or Specialist Services Redesign award in 2018. The model has become a template for other trusts across the UK to integrate primary and secondary child health services and a blueprint for the UK government 2025 plans for Neighbourhood Health for Children.

Watson’s specialist expertise led her to serve from 2019 as Clinical Lead for children’s health in the NHS in North West London, (now an Integrated Care System); to lead the North Kensington (Grenfell) Recovery Paediatric Long-term Monitoring Service for children and young people who survived or were bereaved by the Grenfell Tower fire in 2017; and to lead the Integrated Care Theme, for the Centre of Paediatrics and Child Health at Imperial College, London.

She was also the co-founder of the training programme PICH, or Programme for Integrated Child Health. It aimed to teach general practitioners (GPs), paediatricians and other professionals how to design and deliver integrated child health services and was the first programme of its kind in the United Kingdom. From 2008 until 2019, she was Training Programme Director for the London School of Paediatrics.

Watson was a lead author for "Paediatrician of the Future: Delivering really good training" in October 2020 published by the Royal College of Paediatrics and Child Health (RCPCH). The guide outlines the recommended principles for new postgraduate training programmes. She was then recognised by the Royal College in 2024, becoming an Honorary Fellow.
