= Willard Watson =

American artist (1921–1995)

Willard Watson (1921–1995), was a folk artist from Caddo Parish, Louisiana. He also went by the nickname “The Texas Kid”. He was African-American.

== Early life and family ==
Watson was born on June 17, 1921, in Caddo Parish, Louisiana. He was the son of L. T. and Mary Liza (née Frazier) Watson. His paternal grandparents were once slaves in Louisiana. His maternal relations came to Louisiana via Mississippi, after their emancipation from slavery in Virginia. His parents were sharecroppers in Louisiana. In 1928, he and his family moved to Dallas, Texas. While in Dallas, until fourteen years old, Watson attended the B. F. Darrell School. As he became a young man, he frequented Elm Street's east end in an area known as “Deep Ellum,” which at that time was a major center of African American activity. Watson was nearly shot and stabbed multiple times.

In 1942, during World War II, Watson was in the United States Army and was in the southwestern Pacific area. He was discharged as a disabled veteran in 1944.

During Watson's life, he was married seven times. On April 1, 1967, he married his last wife, Elnora, and they were married for about twenty-eight years.

In 1968, Watson started his nickname as the “Texas Kid”. The start of this was from trips to visit relatives in Louisiana and Oklahoma. The Watsons attended Frontier Days, where all guests wore traditional Western gear. Watson said, "I would make a new outfit every year for us to wear; I’d sew them myself. They would be really showy and attention-getting; when I’d walk up, Elnora’s people would shout: ‘Here comes the Kid from Texas."

== Career ==
Watson based his folk on his "memory, dreams, spirituality, and life circumstances". This provided the inspiration for his crafting, collecting, and art. He was "not formally trained and used objects and materials sourced directly from his daily life". Watson's work started when, as a child, he carved figures from collected wood, and he began to create folk art during his teen years. He learned to sew from his mother and customized clothing and domestic textiles into one-of-a-kind fashions. He produced drawings and paintings on paper. He used tableaus with text as his form of storytelling. He also remolded "natural forms like wood pieces and rocks into sculpture".

By 1975, he used his front lawn to display his works, such as sculptures of animals. His 1968 Ford truck was an art object itself with horns and photographs adhered to the side. This truck grabbed the attention of a local art dealer who started the later wider acclaim. Watson's original intent for art creation was self-expression. He became locally known for his yard art and people passed by to view the art.

in 1976, Watson and Bob “Daddy-O Wade built "a three-dimensional, football-field-size map of the United States near the LBJ freeway.

=== Legal controversy ===
As time passed, a neighbor complained about the “junk” in his yard led to a charge of “illegal open storage” by the City of Dallas Department of Housing and Urban Rehabilitation. Watson was supported by most of his neighbors and was found not guilty of the charge. In addition, he would give tours of his home, accepted donations of art materials, and hosted an annual cookout.

=== Cultural impact ===
In 1985, Watson's house was used as a filming location for David Byrne's movie, True Stories. Watson did not appear in the movie; however, his wife, Elnora, and one of their grandsons had roles.

== Death ==
Willard Watson died, on June 12, 1995, in Dallas. His funeral was held at Missionary Park Baptist Church and his burial was in Lincoln Memorial Park in Dallas. He was survived by a daughter.

== Awards ==
- Watson was featured in Time, Texas Monthly, D magazines, and PM Magazine television program for his art.
- A children's fund was established in his honor.
- Dallas Museum of Art held an exhibit—Willard Watson: In Memorium, 1921–1995, as a tribute.
- Texas Native Artists, Witte Museum in San Antonio, 1978.
- The Eyes of Texas: An Exhibition of Living Texas Folk Artists, University of Houston, 1980.
- Rambling on My Mind: Black Folk Art of the Southwest.
- Museum of African-American Life and Culture, Dallas, 1987.
