= Mary Watson =

Mary Watson may refer to:

- Mary Watson (chemist) (1856–1933), British chemist
- Mary Watson (pioneer) (1860–1881), Australian folk heroine
- Mary Watson (author) (fl. 2000s), South African author
- Mrs Watson (Mary Morstan), Mary, wife of Dr Watson, Sherlock Holmes character
- Mary Jane Watson, Spider-Man character
- Mary Jo Watson, Seminole art historian
- Mary Spencer Watson (1913–2006), English sculptor

== See also ==
- Mary Watson Weaver (1903–1990), American composer, pianist, and poet
- Mary Watson-Wentworth, Marchioness of Rockingham (1735–1804), English wife of Charles Watson-Wentworth, 2nd Marquess of Rockingham
- Mary Watson Whitney (1847–1921), American astronomer
- Mary Gordon-Watson (born 1948), British equestrian
- Mary DeCongé-Watson (1933–2025), American mathematician and former religious sister
