= Steve Watson (disambiguation) =

Steve Watson (born 1974) is an English football manager and former player.

Steve or Stephen Watson may also refer to:

- Steve Watson (actor) (born 1972), actor and TV presenter
- Steve Watson (athletic director), director of athletics for Loyola University Chicago
- Steve Watson (linebacker) (born 1982), American football player
- Steve Watson (wide receiver) (born 1957), American football player
- Steven Watson (author) (born 1947), American writer and filmmaker
- Stephen Watson (footballer) (born 1973), footballer for Rangers and St Mirren
- Stephen Watson (poet) (1954–2011), South African poet
- Stephen Watson (racing driver) (born 1974), South African racing driver
- Stephen H. Watson (born 1951), American philosopher
- Stephen John Watson (1898–1976), British agriculturalist
- Stephen Watson (police officer), British police officer
- S. J. Watson, English writer
- The gibbeting of Stephen Watson, 1795 post-execution display of an English murderer
- Steve Watson, pseudonym for a tech support scammer featured on the Kitboga YouTube channel

== See also ==
- John Steven Watson (1916–1986), English historian who served as Principal of the University of St Andrews from 1966–86
