= George Watson (United States Army Air Corps) =

Tuskegee Airman (1920–2017)

- Born: August 10, 1920
- Died: June 19, 2017 (aged 96)
- Military career
- Branch: United States Army Air Forces; United States Air Force
- Rank: Sergeant
- Unit: 332nd Fighter Group
- Conflicts: World War II

George Watson Sr. (1920–2017) was a supply sergeant and support personnel for the Tuskegee Airmen, the 332nd Fighter Group. He served in the U.S. Army Air Forces during World War II. Mr. Watson was sent to Italy in 1944 and served as a supply sergeant. On March 29, 2007, Watson attended a ceremony in the U.S. Capitol rotunda, where the surviving veterans of the Tuskegee Airmen (and their widows) were awarded the Congressional Gold Medal in recognition of their service.
