= Keith Watson =

Keith Watson may refer to:

- Keith Watson (artist) (1935–1994), British comics artist
- Keith Watson (footballer) (born 1989), Scottish footballer
- Keith Watson (politician) (1900–1973), Australian politician
