= Alonzo Watson =

American anti-fascist (1892–1937)

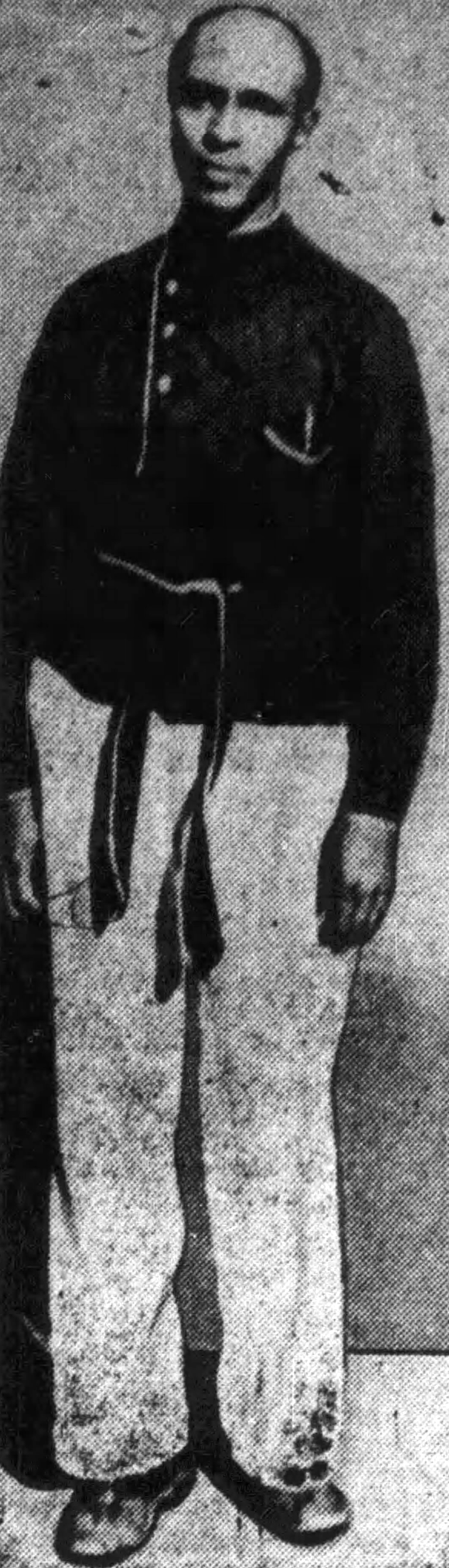
- Born: February 4, 1892; Chicago, Illinois, U.S.
- Died: February 25, 1937 (aged 45); Jarama, Spain
- Military career
- Allegiance: United States; Spanish Republic
- Branch: United States Army; International Brigades
- Service years: c. 1917–1918; 1937
- Rank: Quartermaster
- Units: 365th Illinois Infantry; The "Abraham Lincoln" XV International Brigade
- Conflicts: World War I; Spanish Civil War; Battle of Jarama †

Alonzo Watson (February 4, 1892 – February 25, 1937) was an American volunteer who was killed in action fighting for the Loyalists during the Spanish Civil War. He was the first African-American man to die in the war.

== Biographical sketch ==
Alonzo Watson was born in Chicago, Illinois in February 4, 1892. A veteran of World War I and painter, Watson moved to New York City and joined the Communist Party upon finding common cause with its Harlem activism in the 1930s.

He left New York City for Spain on the day after Christmas in 1936; his was one of the first groups of volunteers to see service in the American outfit known as the Abraham Lincoln Brigade. Staffed mostly by Americans who supported the Second Spanish Republic against the coup led by General Francisco Franco, the Lincoln Brigades composed the first completely integrated American fighting force.

Watson died on February 25, 1937, at the Battle of Jarama. Fellow veteran John Tisa recalls that Watson died in hand-to-hand combat.

His name occurs briefly as a historical character in Captain Blackman (1972), a novel written by African-American writer John Alfred Williams and Bruce Palmer's They Shall Not Pass: A Novel of the Spanish Civil War (1971).

== See also ==
- Oliver Law
