= Andrew Watson (footballer, born 1967) =

English footballer

Personal information
- Full name: Andrew Lyon Watson
- Date of birth: 3 April 1967 (age 59)
- Place of birth: Huddersfield, England
- Height: 5 ft 11 in (1.80 m)
- Position: Defender

Youth career
- Huddersfield Town

Senior career*
Years	Team	Apps	(Gls)
1983–1986	Huddersfield Town	0	(0)
1986–1988	Exeter City	42	(1)
1988–1989	Mossley		
- Emley
- * Club domestic league appearances and goals

Andrew Lyon Watson (born 3 April 1967) is an English former professional footballer who played in the Football League for Exeter City. A defender, he began his career with Huddersfield Town, but never played for their league team, and went on to play non-League football for Mossley and Emley. He was commercial manager of Mossley before taking up executive roles at Everton and Burnley and as a director of Huddersfield Town.
