= Lawrence "Larry" Watson =

American singer-songwriter

Lawrence "Larry" Watson (born October 26, 1952) is an American educator, singer, songwriter, and activist. As of January 2016, Watson serves as Professor of Ensemble at Berklee College of Music and he is also the Resident Artist at the Charles Hamilton Houston Institute of Race and Justice at Harvard Law School.

He co-hosts the television show Sing that thing on WGBH, Boston.

== Early life and education ==
Lawrence Watson born in the Bedford-Stuyvesant section of Brooklyn, New York, Watson credits his strong family ties and the spiritual messages in African American music for his musical direction.

Growing up the 1960s, Watson listened to gospel music, rhythm and blues. This music, he felt, saved him from a life in the streets. Music, he came to believe, could change lives.

Watson attended State University of New York at Oswego. Jerry Seinfeld, Watson's college roommate, in an appearance on the Steve Harvey Show, called Watson "his first black friend". Watson considered the relationship unique, one that crossed racial and cultural divides during the social upheavals of the early seventies.

While an Assistant Dean at Cornell University, Watson was elected to the Board of Education, Ithaca, New York and served on the Tompkins County Human Rights Commission.

== Career ==
=== Activist ===
In 1997, Watson felt he was unfairly arrested for a traffic violation. He spoke out and testified about his arrest before the Massachusetts' legislature.

At Harvard University Watson served as the co-chair of the Association of Black Faculty and Administrators. He and Derrick Bell authored a report on the University’s lack of progress in appointing black professors to tenured positions. Eventually, Watson was dismissed from his position and he alleged discrimination.

=== Music career ===
Watson's performances support human rights and come with a message for social change. Through his music, he advocates for political and humanitarian causes and celebrates the African American experience.

He sang the lead in Langston Hughes Black Nativity (1990) and performed for Nelson Mandela on the Boston Esplanade (1990).

In 1992 he sang for Amnesty International USA (1992) and sang for the Boston chapter of TransAfrica. In 1993, Watson founded Save OurSelves Productions and Consulting (SOS). He has used this platform to speak out on hip hop and educate younger artists.

He performed for the Boston Dialogue on Race in 1996 and Watson's CD, The Journey debuted in 1997. The Journey offers songs of the black experience. The songwriting on the CD was done by Watson and garnered positive reviews. The Boston Globe praised the songwriting, for its meaningful lyrics.

In 2000, he performed in honor of the founding members of the first black art organization chartered in Massachusetts, Boston Afro-American Artists (BAAA ). That same year, Watson released his CD Reparations: from Togo to Arkansas. It condemned slavery, police prejudice and misogyny. The album mixes rhythm and blues, gospel, jazz and funk.

He honored the 54th Massachusetts Infantry Regiment (2003) at the Museum of African American History and memorialized the 50th anniversary of the 1964 Civil Rights Act (2014).

As Resident Artist with the Charles Hamilton Houston Institute of Race and Justice (CHHIRJ), Watson offered musical performances in support of the legal symposia.

In 2007 his appearances at CHHIRJ symposia included: the Annual Martha's Vineyard Forum: Heard it Through the Grapevine: Race and Media in the 21st Century; the 50th Anniversary of Dred Scott v. Sanford: Race, Citizenship and Justice and the 50th Anniversary Celebration Integrating Central High School in Little Rock, Arkansas.

For 2008, he performed for the Annual Martha's Vineyard Forum: Race, Gender, Age and Religion in the 2008 Election. In 2009 he again performed for the Annual Martha's Vineyard Forum: Striking the Right Balance: Addressing Our Individual and Collective Responses to Families and Communities.

The 2010 performance was for the Annual Martha's Vineyard Forum: Race, Reason and Religion. In 2011, he appeared at Celebrating Challenges and Champions: From Houston to Marshall to the 21st Century and the Annual Martha's Vineyard Forum: A Gathering of Elders: Sheros, Heroes and Survivors.

For 2013, he appeared at the Annual Martha's Vineyard Forum: Race, Place and Health, Take Two Aspirin's.

== Awards ==
In 1996, the Boston-based civil rights organization, Community Change, awarded Watson the Drylongso Award for his efforts in the fight against racism. And in 2001, the Cambridge, MA chapter of the NAACP awarded Watson the Alvin E. Thompson Civil Rights Award for his outstanding leadership and promotion of community empowerment.

== Discography ==
- The Journey (1997)
- Reparations: from Togo to Arkansas (2000)
- Prescriptions (2016)
