= Eric Watson =

Eric Watson may refer to:

- Eric Watson (businessman) (born 1959), New Zealand businessman
- Eric Watson (cricketer) (1925–2017), New Zealand cricketer and national rugby union team coach
- Eric Watson (footballer) (1893–1971), Australian rules footballer
- Eric Watson (musician) (born 1955), American jazz pianist and composer
- Eric Watson (photographer) (1955–2012), British photographer
- Eric Watson (politician) (born 1973), Republican member of the Tennessee House of Representatives
- Eric Vernon Watson (1914–1999), British bryologist
- Eric James Watson (born 1946), Singapore-based Welsh musician, composer and conductor
