= Edwin Watson =

Edwin Watson may refer to:

- Edwin Watson (footballer) (1914–1944), Scottish footballer
- Edwin "Pa" Watson (1883–1945), U.S. Army general, friend and advisor to President Franklin D. Roosevelt
- Edwin Watson (American football) (born 1976), American football running back
- Edwin Moss Watson (1867–1937), newspaper editor and publisher in Columbia, Missouri
