= George Watson (baseball) =

American baseball player

- Third baseman
- Born: June 6, 1881
- Threw: Right

Negro league baseball debut
- 1914, for the Louisville White Sox

Last appearance
- 1915, for the Louisville White Sox

Teams
- Louisville White Sox (1914–1915)

George Watson (June 6, 1881 – death date unknown) was an American Negro league third baseman in the 1910s.

Watson played for the Louisville White Sox in 1914 and 1915. In six recorded games with Louisville, he posted five hits in 23 plate appearances.
