= Colin Watson =

Colin Watson may refer to:

- Colin Watson (egg collector) (1943–2006), infamous British collector of protected eggs
- Colin Watson (footballer) (1900–1970), Australian rules footballer for St. Kilda
- Colin Watson (speedway rider) (c. 1896–?), British motorcycle speedway rider
- Colin Watson (writer) (1920–1983), British writer of detective fiction
