= Mark Watson (military officer) =

Commodore Mark B. Watson is a Royal Canadian Navy officer. He is the current Director General of Morale and Welfare Services (DGMWS) at National Defence Headquarters in Ottawa.

== Personal life ==
Watson grew up in Barrie, Ontario and stayed there up until his early adolescence.

== Military career ==
=== Commander of CFSU (Ottawa) ===
Prior to his appointment as the Director General of Morale and Welfare Services, Watson was the Commanding Officer of the Canadian Forces Support Unit (Ottawa). In this role Watson was responsible for over 50,000 Defence community members in the National Capital Region, including Regular Force members, Reserve Force members, civilian employees, veterans and their families.

As CO of CFSU (Ottawa), Watson launched numerous community initiatives such as the launch of the Guard of Honour newspaper and the organization of the Canadian Defence Community Family Appreciation Days at CFB Uplands.

=== Director General Morale and Welfare Services ===
After two years as the Commanding Officer of CFSU (Ottawa), Watson was promoted to Commodore and appointed Director General of Morale and Welfare Services. In his Christmas 2013 address, Watson said his first year as DGMWS was largely successful: they had launched the CFOne Card, implemented a new fitness test for Canadian Forces members, created a 24/7 Family Information line, and provided support to thousands of ill or injured Canadian Forces personnel.

Shortly after being appointed, in April 2013, Watson's department changed its name from Canadian Forces Personnel and Family Support Services to Canadian Forces Morale and Welfare Services.

As DGMWS, Watson reports to the Chief of Military Personnel.
