= Andrew Watson (footballer, born 1894) =

Scottish footballer

Personal information
- Date of birth: 1894
- Place of birth: Kirkcaldy, Scotland
- Height: 5 ft 8 in (1.73 m)
- Position: Right back

Senior career*
Years	Team	Apps	(Gls)
- Kirkcaldy United
- Bolton Wanderers
1922–1923	Bradford City	7	(0)
Total		7	
- * Club domestic league appearances and goals

Andrew Watson (born 1894) was a Scottish professional footballer who played as a right back.

== Career ==
Born in Kirkcaldy, Watson spent his early career with Kirkcaldy United and Bolton Wanderers. He signed for Bradford City in July 1922, making 7 league appearances for the club before being released in 1923.

== Sources ==
- Frost, Terry (1988). Bradford City A Complete Record 1903-1988. Breedon Books Sport. ISBN 0-907969-38-0.
