= Kenneth Watson =

Kenneth Watson may refer to:

- Kenneth Watson (actor) (1931–1998), British television actor
- Kenneth Albert Watson (1912–1999), British businessman in Hong Kong
- Kenneth Bowman Watson (1897–1960), Canadian World War I flying ace
- Kenneth M. Watson (1921–2023), theoretical physicist and physical oceanographer
- Kenny Watson (American football) (born 1978), American football running back
- Kenny Watson (cricketer) (born 1955), South African cricketer
- Kenny Watson (footballer) (born 1956), Scottish footballer
- Ken Watson (1904–1986), Canadian curler
- Kenneth "Kenny" Watson (character), the main protagonist and the narrator of the historical-fiction novel, The Watsons Go to Birmingham – 1963
