= Ted Watson =

English footballer

Personal information
- Full name: Edward George Watson
- Date of birth: 28 April 1895
- Place of birth: Felling, England
- Position: Full back

Senior career*
Years	Team	Apps	(Gls)
1914–1915	Felling Colliery		
1919–1920	Portsmouth		
1920–1921	Pontypridd		
1921–1929	Wolverhampton Wanderers	190	(4)
1929–1932	Coventry City	85	(0)
1932	Oakengates Town		
Total		275	(4)
- * Club domestic league appearances and goals

Edward George Watson (born 28 April 1895) was an English footballer who played in the Football League for Coventry City and Wolverhampton Wanderers.
