= Joe Watson (folklorist) =

Australian folklorist

Joe Watson was an Australian folklorist born in the New South Wales township of Boorowa on 15 August 1881.
