= Alan Watson =

Alan, Allen or Allan Watson may refer to:

- Alan Watson (legal scholar) (1933–2018), Scottish law and legal history expert
- Alan Watson (magician) (born 1950), New Zealand magician
- Alan Watson, Baron Watson of Richmond (born 1941), South Africa born, British broadcaster and politician
- Alan Watson (rower) (1929–2007), British Olympic rower
- Alan Andrew Watson (born 1938), British physicist
- Alan Cameron Watson (1900–1976), Presbyterian minister
- Allan Watson (footballer) (born 1948), Scottish footballer
- Allan Watson (American football) (1942–2024), Welsh-born player of soccer and American football
- Allan Griffiths Watson (1876–1945), South African Railways chief mechanical engineer
- Allen Watson (born 1970), American baseball player and coach
