= Raymond Watson (disambiguation) =

Raymond Watson (died 2012) was chairman of Walt Disney Productions.

Raymond Watson may also refer to:

- Raymond Watson (artist) (born 1958), visual artist from Belfast, Northern Ireland
- J. Raymond Watson (1935–2020), Puerto Rican engineer
- Ray Watson (runner) (1898–1974), American track and field athlete
- Ray Watson (broadcaster) (born 1936), California politician
- Ray Watson (judge) (1922–2010), Australian Family Court judge
- Ray H. Watson (1923–2004), American football coach
