= Ed Watson =

Ed Watson may refer to:

- Edgar Watson (1855–1910), American outlaw
- Edwin Moss Watson (1867–1937), American newspaper editor
- Edwin M. Watson (1883–1945), aide to U.S. President Franklin D. Roosevelt

== See also ==
- Edward Watson (disambiguation)
