= Albert Watson =

Albert Watson may refer to:

- Albert Watson (academic) (1828–1904), Principal of Brasenose College, Oxford, 1886–1889
- Albert Watson (footballer, born 1903) (1903–?), English football player for Blackpool
- Albert Watson (footballer, born 1918) (1918–2009), English football player for Huddersfield and Oldham
- Albert Watson (footballer, born 1985), Northern Irish football player for Carrick Rangers
- Albert Watson (Illinois judge) (1857–1944), American jurist
- Albert Watson (photographer) (born 1942), Scottish fashion and celebrity photographer, working in the US since the early 1970s
- Albert Watson (South Carolina politician) (1922–1994), Member of the US House of Representatives from South Carolina; Republican candidate for governor of South Carolina in 1970
- Albert Watson II (1909–1993), U.S. Army officer
- Albert Durrant Watson (1859–1926), Canadian poet and physician
- Albert Leisenring Watson (1876–1960), U.S. federal judge from Pennsylvania
- Abe Watson (Albert Victor Watson, 1871–1932), Australian rules footballer
