= Amelia Watson =

American painter

Amelia Montague Watson (1856–1934) was an American watercolorist well known for her work in Martha's Vineyard.

== Biography ==
Born in East Windsor Hill, Connecticut on March 2, 1856, to Sarah (Bolles) and Reed Watson, she received a private education. Watson became a watercolorist.

Her younger sister, Edith, also painted watercolors and exhibited with Amelia, before becoming a successful photographer in Canada.

== Career ==
She taught painting at a Martha's Vineyard summer school for twenty years in the last 19th century and exhibited in major east coast cities. In 1888 and 1889 she taught at the short-lived Martha's Vineyard Summer Institute. In a bulletin, the institute described her classes for the Department of Painting:

Lessons will be given in oil, watercolor and pastel. The work will be carried on in all favorable weather out of doors, and will consist of making sketches of the many attractive bits of sea and landscape which the Island has to offer. … Occasional and inexpensive trips will be takes to some of the quaint towns of the Island … pupils will have special opportunity to become familiar with the beauties and characteristics of the Island, and also to receive the full benefit of air and sunshine.

In 1894, Watson submitted a note regarding the taming of a chipping sparrow which was published in The Auk.

Watson produced a series of illustrations of scenes from Henry David Thoreau's "excursion" book, Cape Cod. Originally a gift for her companion Margaret Warner Morley, they were incorporated into an 1896 illustrated edition of the book published by Houghton Mifflin. A note in the book described "marginal sketches in color made by the artist as she read the successive chapters amid the scenes characterized by Thoreau. Thus she saw the sand, the lighthouse, the ocean, the sails, the fishermen, the weather-beaten houses, and when Thoreau threw in a Floridian contrast she was able happily to jot down a note in color from her own Florida sketches." Watson also illustrated a book by Margaret Morley called "The Carolina Mountains".
