= Bryan Watson =

Bryan Watson may refer to:

- Bryan Watson (dancer) (born 1969), South African ballroom dancer
- Bryan Watson (ice hockey) (1942–2021), Canadian ice hockey defenseman

== See also ==
- Brian Watson (disambiguation)
