= Thomas Watson =

Thomas Watson may refer to:

== Bishops ==
- Thomas Watson (bishop of Lincoln) (1515–1584), Catholic bishop
- Thomas Watson (bishop of St Davids) (1637–1717), English clergyman

== Writers ==
- Thomas Watson (poet) (1555–1592), English poet and translator
- Thomas Watson (Puritan) (c. 1620–1686), nonconformist preacher and writer
- Tom Watson (journalist) (born 1962), journalist and author

== Sportsmen ==
=== Association Football ===
- Tom Watson (football manager) (1859–1915), English football manager
- Tom Watson (footballer, born 1860s) (1868 or 1869 – 1902), English football goalkeeper for Small Heath
- Tom Watson (Australian footballer) (1874–1920), Australian rules footballer
- Tom Watson (footballer, born 1900) (1900–1978), Ireland international football player
- Tom Watson (footballer, born 1904) (1904–1979), footballer for Rochdale
- Gordon Watson (footballer, born 1914) (Thomas Gordon Watson, 1914–2001), English footballer for Everton
- Tommy Watson (footballer, born 1943), Scottish football winger
- Tommy Watson (footballer, born 1969), English football player
- Tommy Watson (footballer, born 2006), footballer for Brighton & Hove Albion

=== Cricket ===
- Thomas Watson (cricketer, born 1880) (1880–1944), English clergyman and cricketer
- Thomas Watson (Scottish cricketer) (1896–1974)
- Thomas Watson (cricketer, born 1913) (1913–1994), English cricketer and educator

=== Other Sports ===
- Tommy Watson (boxer) (1908–1971), English boxer
- Tom Watson (golfer) (born 1949), American golfer
- Tom Watson (fighter) (born 1982), mixed martial artist

== Politicians ==
- Thomas Watson (silk spinner) (1823–1887), British politician; MP for Ilkeston, Derbyshire, 1885–1887
- Thomas E. Watson (1856–1922), American politician; Populist leader; U.S. senator from Georgia
- Thomas Philip Watson (1933–2015), American politician; Oklahoma state senator
- Thomas R. Watson (born 1947), American politician; Maine state representative
- Thomas Watson, 3rd Earl of Rockingham (1715–1746), English nobleman and politician; MP for Canterbury
- Thomas Watson (Berwick-upon-Tweed MP) (c. 1701–1766), British politician; MP for Berwick-upon-Tweed, 1754–1765
- J. Thomas Watson (1885–1954), Florida attorney general
- Tom Watson, Baron Watson of Wyre Forest (born 1967), British politician; former deputy leader of the Labour Party; and former MP for West Bromwich East
- Thomas Watson (died before 1621) English member of parliament

== Businesspeople ==
- Thomas J. Watson (1874–1956), first president of IBM
- Thomas J. Watson Jr. (1914–1993), second president of IBM and son of Thomas J. Watson

== Artists ==
- Thomas Watson (engraver) (1750–1781), fine engraver
- T. H. Watson (Thomas Henry Watson, 1839–1913), British architect
- Thomas Lennox Watson (1850–1920), Scottish architect and interior designer
- Tom Watson (actor) (1932–2001), Scottish-born stage, television and film actor
- Yannima Tommy Watson (c. 1935–2017), Australian artist

== Others ==
- Thomas A. Watson (1854–1934), inventor and assistant to Alexander Graham Bell, notably in the invention of the telephone
- Tom Watson (musician) (born 1962), American guitarist
- Thomas E. Watson (USMC) (1892–1966), U.S. Marine Corps general
- Thomas Watson (surveyor), early Western Australian surveyor
- Thomas Watson (trade unionist) (1860–1921), British trade union leader
- Thomas Colclough Watson (1867–1917), British recipient of the Victoria Cross
- Sir Thomas Watson, 1st Baronet (1792–1882), British physician and president of the Royal College of Physicians, 1862–66
- Thomas Watson (Royal Navy officer) (died 1744), British navy captain
