= Andrew Watson (cricketer) =

Australian cricketer (born 1955)

Personal information
- Born: 14 October 1955 (age 71); Woomera, South Australia
- Source: Cricinfo, 29 September 2020

Andrew Watson (born 14 October 1955) is an Australian cricketer. He played in ten first-class matches for South Australia between 1985 and 1987.

== See also ==
- List of South Australian representative cricketers
