= George Watson (Australian rules footballer) =

Australian rules footballer

Personal information
- Full name: George Watson
- Born: 16 March 1922
- Died: 20 September 1978 (aged 56)
- Original team: Oakleigh
- Height: 173 cm (5 ft 8 in)
- Weight: 66 kg (146 lb)

Playing career^{1}
Years	Club	Games (Goals)
1942	Fitzroy	4 (3)
- ^{1} Playing statistics correct to the end of 1942.

George Watson (16 March 1922 – 20 September 1978) was a former Australian rules footballer who played with Fitzroy in the Victorian Football League (VFL).
