= Craig Watson =

Craig Watson may refer to:

- Craig Watson (boxer) (born 1983), British welterweight boxer
- Craig Watson (footballer, born 1942) (1942–2001), Scottish footballer
- Craig Watson (footballer, born 1995), Scottish footballer
- Craig Watson (golfer) (born 1966), Scottish golfer
- Craig Watson (speedway rider) (born 1976), Australian speedway rider
- Craig Watson (triathlete) (born 1971), New Zealand triathlete
