= Herbert Watson =

Herbert Watson may refer to:

- Herbert Watson (footballer) (1908–1939), English football right half
- Herbert Gilles Watson (1889–1942), Australian flying ace
- H. E. Watson (1886–1940), professor of chemical engineering
