= Frederick Watson (artist) =

Canadian fashion illustrator and painter

- Born: Frederick John Watson; 1935; Barrie, Ontario, Canada
- Died: December 2017 (aged 81–82); Canada
- Known for: Fashion illustrator
- Movement: Modern art

Frederick John Watson was a Canadian fashion illustrator and painter from Barrie, Ontario. He is best known for his international paintings of women, fashion illustrations and theater and Art Deco posters. He has also created a fine art print collection of stylized women reminiscent of the Art Deco style. The start of inspiration for his work came from a woman he saw on Madison Avenue in New York City, wearing black, high heels, a diamond brooch, and carrying an umbrella.

== Biography ==
Frederick Watson was born to a farm family in Barrie, Ontario. His father worked in the air force as a pilot and not around much. After moving to Toronto in his early 20's, before becoming an illustrator, he worked at Simpsons for five years. One morning, a mysteriously dressed woman came in with an open portfolio and checked in her coat before going shopping. From the contents of that portfolio, his love for fashion was born. Watson's first official show was the Alexander gallery in New York City. His style was heavily impacted by years of studying the design of art deco and marketing illustration materials. His pencil work was first recognized in magazines such as theatrical and glamour posters, which went on to become valued collector's items on the Toronto art scene. He was an actor for a while but ended up deciding it wasn't for him. He also took up tap dancing for the Fred Astaire company in Toronto but ultimately went back to his passion of fashion drawing. Watson drew mice for a Christmas ad which would go on to be his first project.

His mother's red hair may have been a precursor to his art career and served as an inspiration for many of his artworks. Watson found inspiration and beauty in the rarest of places. From toe dancing at Eaton's Auditorium (The Carlu) in Toronto, to horseback riding, to his Canadian hometown to performing at Museum theatre Harlequin in Toronto; no matter what he was doing, he always knew that inside he was an artist. His mentor, Jean Miller, illustrator for the Robert Simpson Co., is who he credits for getting him started in fashion illustrations in 1957. Frederick Watson was a man with an eye for beauty and the ability to transport all of his viewers into a world of glamour and style. In the words of Frederick himself, "Elegance is timeless".

His mentor, Jean Miller, illustrator for the Robert Simpson Co., who he credited for getting him started in fashion illustrations in 1957. Watson's pieces begin with a face either from a reference, his imagination or both. He started painting for himself and people seemed to have loved the results. He painted everyday and was always looking out for image that inspired him. These images were mostly found in books he owned and various magazines containing photos and illustrations from his favorite fashion era. When Watson was 76 he did nothing but paint and didn't want to illustrate anymore. At that time in his life he did not want to worry about the pressures of deadlines.

== Social Impact ==
Watson was invited as a guest on numerous television and radio shows and has been interviewed in major newspapers and columns in the Toronto Star, the Globe and Mail, Bravo, US Magazine along with many other journals. He has done volunteer work at several HIV/AIDS|AIDS fundraiser events. Frederick's prints have not only been in newspapers but he has also contributed limited edition prints for jewelry companies, cruise ships and luxury goods. Watson's work has also appeared in several paramount shows in New York City and Toronto. The core of his art celebrates the beauty of women from all over.

Fashion journalist and Canadian television personality Jeanne Baker had known Watson for almost two decades and collaborated with him at several fashion events. She was first attracted to his work because of the history and fashion illustration aspects. She now owns several of his paintings that are displayed throughout her home.
