= Ben Watson =

Ben Watson or Benjamin Watson may refer to:

- Ben Watson (footballer, born July 1985), English footballer with Charlton Athletic
- Ben Watson (footballer, born December 1985), English footballer with St Martins
- Ben Watson (music writer) (born 1957), British Marxist writer on music
- Ben Watson (weightlifter) (born 1990), British weightlifter
- Ben Watson (politician) (born 1959), American politician in the Georgia State Senate
- Benjamin Watson (born 1980), American football player
- Benjamin Charles Watson, Canadian actor
- Benjamin Philip Watson (1880-1976), Scottish obstetrician
- Ben Watson (cyclist) (born 1989), British para cyclist
- Ben Watson (motocross racer) (born 1997), British motocross rider
