= Debbie Watson =

Debbie Watson may refer to:

- Debbie Watson (actress) (born 1949), American actress
- Debbie Watson (water polo) (born 1965), Australian water polo player
