= Charles Watson =

Charles Watson may refer to:

- Charles Watson (Royal Navy officer) (1714–1757), British naval officer, governor of Newfoundland
- Charles Watson-Wentworth, 2nd Marquess of Rockingham (1730–1782), Whig Prime Minister of the United Kingdom
- Charles Watson (Wisconsin legislator) (1836–1910), Republican member of the Wisconsin State Assembly
- Charles Moore Watson (1844–1916), Anglo-Irish British Army officer, engineer and administrator
- Charles Boog Watson (1858–1947), Scottish engineer and antiquarian
- Charles A. Watson (1871–1948), President of the American University in Cairo
- Charles H. Watson (1877–1962), Seventh-day Adventist minister and administrator
- Charles G. M. Watson (1878–1961), Australian national chess champion
- Chub Watson (Charles Watson, 1915–1971), American professional basketball player
- Charles Vincent Watson (1882–1930), Australian army officer and patent attorney
- Charles W. Watson (1915–2002), American sculptor
- Tex Watson (Charles Denton Watson, Jr., born 1945), American murderer
- C. J. Watson (born 1984), American professional basketball player
- Charles Watson (businessman), American businessman, founder of The Natural Gas Clearinghouse
- Charles Watson, British musician with Slow Club
