= Matthew Watson =

Matthew or Matt Watson may refer to:

- Matthew Watson (footballer, born 1976), Australian rules footballer with Essendon
- Matthew Watson (footballer, born 1992), Australian rules footballer with Carlton
- Matthew Watson (political economist), professor of political economy
- Matt Watson (baseball) (born 1978), American baseball player
- Matt Watson (cricketer) (born 1987), English cricketer
- Matt Watson (entrepreneur) (born 1981), American entrepreneur
- Matt Watson (footballer, born 1936) (1936–2015), Scottish football player
- Matt Watson (footballer, born 1985), US-based soccer player
- Matt Watson (YouTuber) (born 1996), American YouTuber, comedian, and musician
- Matt Watson, fisherman and host of The ITM Fishing Show
