= Edith S. Watson =

Canadian photographer (1861–1943)

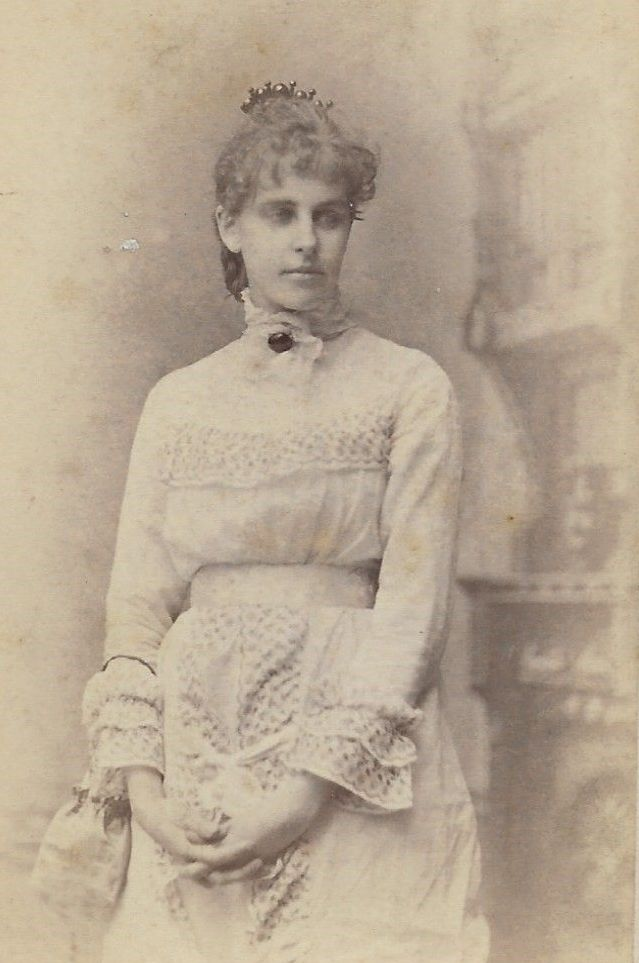
- Born: Edith Sarah Watson; November 9, 1861; East Windsor Hill, Connecticut, U.S.
- Died: December 23, 1943 (aged 82); St. Petersburg, Florida, U.S.
- Occupation: Photographer
- Notable work: Romantic Canada (1922)
- Relatives: Amelia Watson (sister); Sereno Watson (uncle)

Edith Sarah Watson (November 9, 1861 – December 23, 1943) was a photographer whose career spanned the 1890s through the 1930s. She is best known for her photojournalistic images of rural people working, most often women, particularly in Canada.

== Early life ==
Born in 1861 in East Windsor Hill, Connecticut, United States, she was the youngest of four children of Sarah and Reed Watson. Reed farmed tobacco and, during times of poor crops, worked as a printer in Cambridge, Massachusetts. Edith Watson studied at Hartford Female Seminary, founded by Catherine Beecher, educational reformer and sister of Uncle Tom's Cabin author Harriet Beecher Stowe. During her early years, Watson's uncle, medical doctor, botanist and photographer, Sereno Watson, introduced her to the art and tools of photography.

For a decade after Edith's 1882 graduation from the seminary, she and her sister, Amelia Watson, a lifelong watercolourist, shared shows and sales around New England. In 1887 they built a studio on one end of the family home, where they continued to show, sell, and work when they were at home. In the 1890s, the sisters' paths diverged: Amelia went south, Edith Watson north.

== Photography career ==
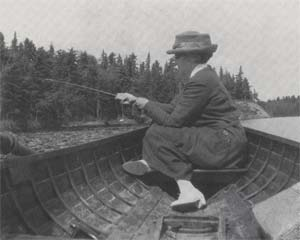
Edith Watson

Watson's professional travels began in Newfoundland and Canada in the early 1890s. She went first as a painter, but soon partly, then almost exclusively, earned her living as an artistic and commercial photographer of rural people, most often women, across the country. She sold her photographs to numerous North American newspapers and magazines; she sometimes bartered her photographs to obtain lodging or supplies. Through these efforts, she maintained her independence and supported herself as both artist and traveler.

Starting in 1898, Watson spent winters in Bermuda, where she rented a studio in St. George's, and sold watercolours and hand-tinted photographs. In 1911, she met journalist Victoria "Queenie" Hayward (1876–1956), who became her partner in work and in life. The pair lived, worked, and traveled extensively together through isolated areas of Newfoundland, Labrador and Canada.

With her camera, Watson documented the lives of people in Newfoundland, Labrador, the Maritimes, Quebec, Ontario, and then westward into Manitoba, Saskatchewan and British Columbia, while Hayward wrote about them. The two women stayed with First Nations people in Quebec and Ontario; Mennonites, Doukhobors, and other "New Canadians" in Manitoba, Saskatchewan and British Columbia; and Haida people in British Columbia.

Edith worked and travelled alone for twenty years, then for almost another two decades with Victoria Hayward. Throughout that time she sold her work to governments and advertisers, as well as publications including Chatelaine, Maclean's, the Canadian Magazine, National Geographic, and Ladies’ Home Journal. Uncommonly for the time, she insisted on being credited for her published work.

In 1922, Macmillan Canada published Watson and Hayward's Romantic Canada. The largest travel book published in the country to that time, it featured 77 of Watson's photographs reproduced in halftone. It was unique, as it highlighted women's contributions to rural communities. In it, Hayward coined the phrase "the Canadian mosaic" to describe the country's multiculturalism; the phrase and concept was picked up by subsequent thinkers and artists, including writer and cultural promoter John Murray Gibbon.

Watson died on a trip to St. Petersburg, Florida, in 1943.

== Photographs of Canadian women ==
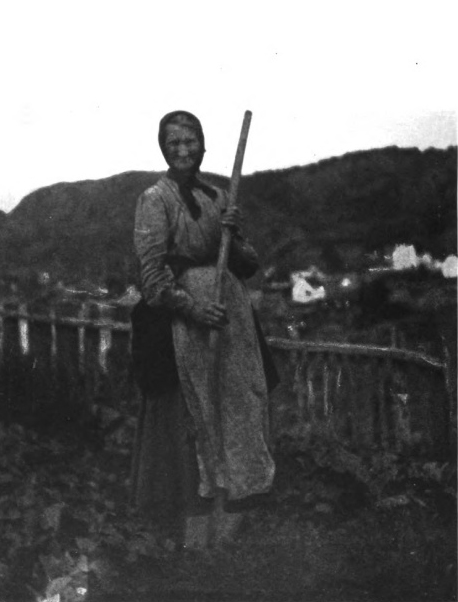
"Hoeing Potatoes, Petty Harbour"

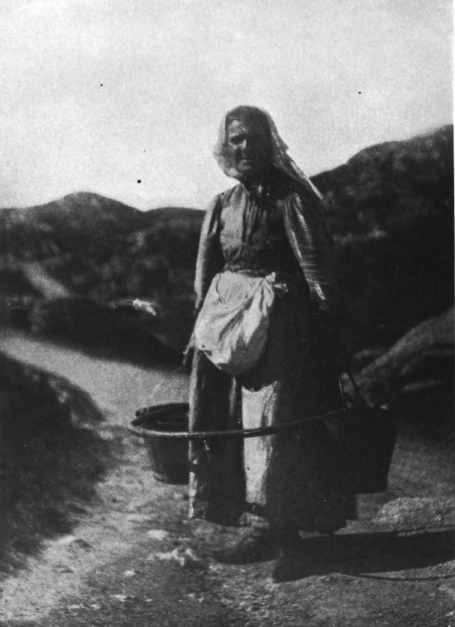
"Along the Shore at Burgeo, Newfoundland, Canada"

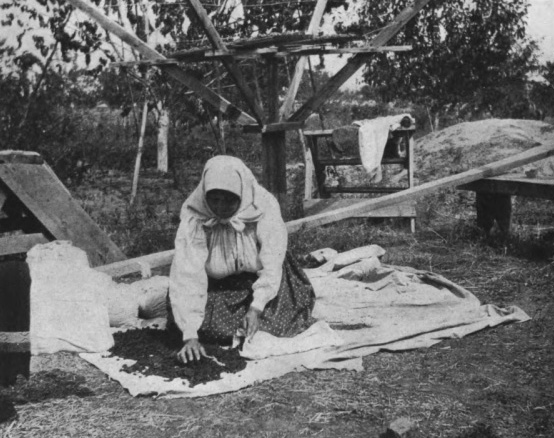
"Dried berries being packed away for winter luxuries"

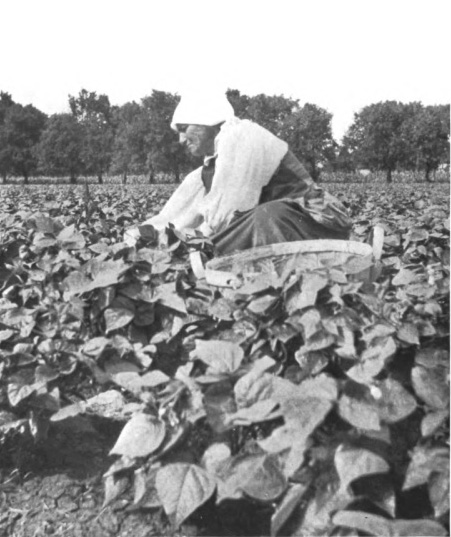
"Weeding beans on a Dutch truck farm outside Winnipeg, Manitoba"

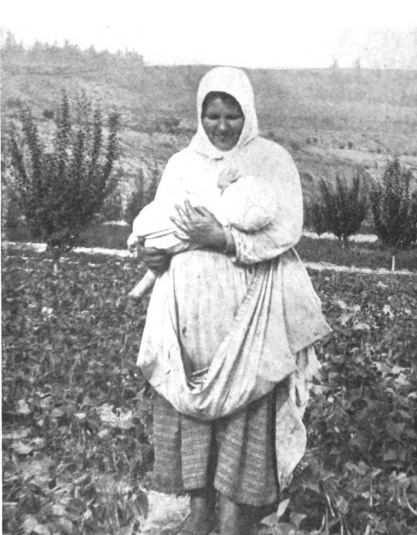
"Madonna of the Fields"

== Photographs of Bermuda ==
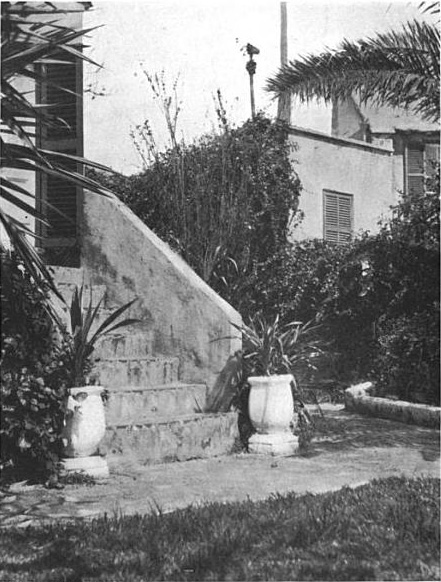
Flower jars of carved coral, Bermuda
