= Leroy Watson =

Leroy Watson may refer to:

- Leroy Watson (archer) (born 1966), British archer
- Leroy Watson (American football) (born 1998), American football offensive tackle
- Leroy H. Watson (1893–1975), United States Army general
