= Andy Watson =

Andy Watson may refer to:

- Andy Watson (footballer, born 1959), Scottish footballer and coach
- Andy Watson (footballer, born 1967), English footballer
- Andy Watson (footballer, born 1978), English footballer
- Andy Watson (mayor), mayor of Rangitikei in New Zealand
- Andy Watson (Ontario politician) (born 1937), Canadian politician
- Andy Watson (scientist), British scientist

== See also ==
- Andrew Watson (disambiguation)
