= Richard Watson (born 1833) =

English poet

Richard Watson (16 March 1833 – 2 Oct 1891), known as the Bard of Teesdale was an English poet from Middleton-in-Teesdale, County Durham. He wrote in both Standard English and the Teesdale dialect.

== Life ==
Richard Watson was born on March 16, 1833, in Middleton-in-Teesdale, to William Watson, a miner employed by the London Lead Company. At the age of six, he began attending the company's school, established for workers’ children, where he received a basic education under schoolmaster John Hyslop. However, due to his family's financial difficulties, Watson left school at the age of ten to work in the leadmines.

His father's death at the age of 47 left 14-year-old Richard as part of a struggling household, supporting his widowed mother, two brothers, and six sisters. Despite these hardships, Watson showed an early gift for poetry, entertaining schoolmates and miners with impromptu verses. Much of his early work was not written down, but his talent became widely recognised after the publication of Dialogue between the Tower and Bridge in the Teesdale Mercury.

The poem's success marked the start of Watson's reputation as a poet. His style, influenced by Robert Burns, blended humour and philosophy, capturing the character of rural life in Teesdale. His work has continued to be celebrated for its authenticity and connection to the Teesdale region.
