= Joseph Watson (academic) =

Irish academic

Joseph Watson (Seosamh) is emeritus professor of Modern Irish at University College Dublin, a Celtic Faculty chair which dates from the foundation of the National University He was Dean of Faculty 1995–2001.

Professor Watson was head boy at the Royal Belfast Academical Institution during 1961-1962 from where he won an open scholarship in Classics to King's College, Cambridge. He carried out postgraduate work thereafter in Celtic languages at Edinburgh University and the Dublin Institute for Advanced Studies and, following a period in the Irish Civil Service, was appointed to the Department of Modern Irish at University College Dublin in 1970.

As Seosamh Watson, he is familiar to students and scholars of Irish language and literature on account of numerous academic, as well as more popular, books and articles. His work on Irish literature, which includes an edition of the burlesque late 17th century tale Mac na Míchomhairle, has focused on early modern Irish prose and poetry from Ulster. He has made a special linguistic study of the Scottish Highlanders' culture in Nova Scotia and is particularly interested in connections between Ulster and Gaelic Scotland. A translation by him of Éamonn Ó Tuathail's collection of Tyrone Folktales, Sgéalta Mhuintir Luinigh, was published in 2015 by Four Courts Press. He is a founding member of the International Society for Dialectology and Geolinguistics, and joint editor of the multi-volume UNESCO-sponsored Atlas Linguarum Europae, currently published by the Romanian Academy of Science. A prominent member of the Baha'i community in Ireland, Watson has translated a number of religious texts into Irish, including The Hidden Words by Baháʼu'lláh. He and his wife, Dr Vivien Hick, formerly Assistant Keeper at the National Museum of Ireland, have six children. Seosamh was co-founder in 1984 of the Oideas Gael adult learning institution in Glencolmcille, County Donegal. Programmes there are now attended by over 1,000 participants annually. At the 15th International Congress of Celtic Studies in 2015, the University of Glasgow, which hosted the event, awarded Watson an Honorary Doctor of Letters degree for his contribution to the discipline.
