= Sheila Watson =

Sheila Watson may refer to:

- Sheila Watson (priest) (born 1953), Archdeacon of Canterbury
- Sheila Watson (writer) (1909–1998), Canadian novelist, critic and teacher
