= George Watson (photographer) =

American photographer (1892–1977)

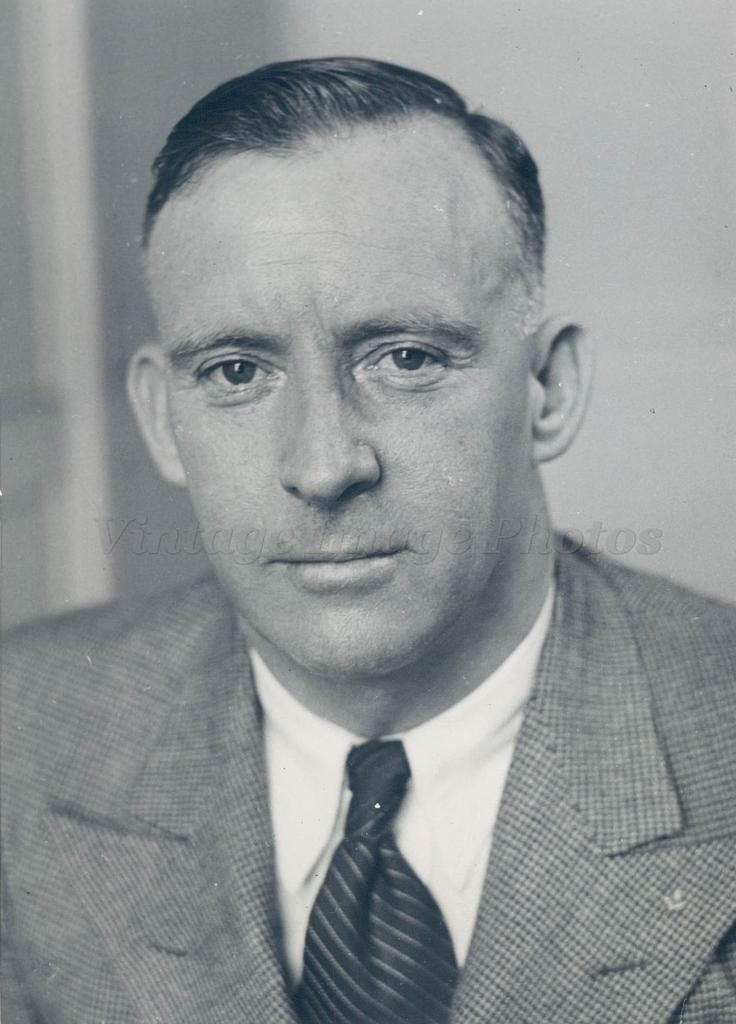
- Watson in 1936
- Born: George Railton Watson; February 10, 1892; Moncton, New Brunswick, Canada
- Died: May 12, 1977 (aged 85); Los Angeles, California, United States
- Occupation: Photographer

George Watson (February 10, 1892 – May 12, 1977) was a 20th-century American photographer working in California. Several of his relatives were also in the photo business, or in the motion picture industry, or broadcast news.

Watson was born in 1892 in Moncton, Westmorland, New Brunswick, Canada. Watson immigrated to the U.S. in 1900 and was naturalized a citizen in 1909. Watson got his first newspaper staff job in Los Angeles in 1910. He shot aerial photos of Los Angeles in 1919, and he photographed the St. Francis dam disaster and the Owens River Aqueduct bombing. Watson also founded the Los Angeles Press Photographers Association.

He left newspapers to become manager of ACME Newspictures, later UPI Photo. He took celebrity and Hollywood photos in the 1920s and 1930s in company with colleagues like Paul Strite, Dick Farrell, and Hyman Fink. The family archive includes of a photo by Watson of Albert Einstein and Charlie Chaplin together at a movie premiere in the 1920s.

The work of the Watson clan was exhibited in a show at the Los Angeles Science Museum in 1972. The Getty holds a collection of Watson's shots. The total Watson family archive may include between one and two million photographs.
