= Lisa Watson =

Newspaper editor from the Falkland Islands

- Born: 1969 (age 56–57); Falkland Islands, British Overseas Territory
- Occupation: newspaper editor
- Years active: 1999–present
- Known for: attaining the financial independence of the Penguin News

Lisa Watson (born 1969) is the editor of the Falkland Islands' Penguin News. Prior to her tenure, the newspaper was subsidized by the government. She raised advertising revenues to make the paper financially independent and remove the potentiality that the government was controlling the content of the news.

== Early life ==
Lisa Watson was born in 1969 in the Falkland Islands to Neil and Glenda Watson. She grew up on her parents' farm near Berkeley Sound. Because their farm was remote, when Watson and her brothers Paul and Ben were in school, they lived with their grandmother in Stanley. Watson was thirteen years old when the Falklands was invaded in 1982. Lisa and her older brother were taken from Stanley to the farm by her father who came to collect them. Early in the conflict the family were subject to harassment by Argentine troops as a result of a belief they were hiding a Royal Marine who they believed had escaped during the initial invasion. During the conflict, Argentine troops were stationed just a mile away from the farm and frequently checked on the family who were subject to a curfew. At the end of the war, the British military investment and presence on the island, spawned an economic rebirth in 1986, allowing funds for scholarships to island children to study free-of-charge in Britain. Watson was one of the first students to take advantage of the scholarship and studied English literature at Bangor University in Wales. She returned to the Falklands Islands on finishing her studies. Lisa has one son Jacob Riddell born in 1993.

== Career ==
Initially, upon her return to the Islands, Watson took a job managing the office for a fishing company. When the assistant editor of the Penguin News quit his job in 1999, she received a call from the editor asking her if she wanted the position. After a year in the post, her boss became the head of the tourism department and Watson was promoted to editor of the newspaper. Concerned that taking government subsidies for operating the paper might give the appearance that the content of the newspaper might be influenced, Watson raised advertising revenues to ensure that the paper was financially independent.

In 2012, she published a book Waking up to War which recounted her memories of experiencing the Falklands War as a twelve-year-old. In 2017, her horse, Storm Chaser, won the Governor's Cup under jockey, Cristian Castro at the Stanley Sports Association Boxing Day race meeting.
