= Walter Holmes (footballer) =

English footballer

Personal information
- Full name: Walter Holmes
- Date of birth: 9 May 1892
- Place of birth: Willington, County Durham, England
- Date of death: 1978 (aged 85–86)
- Position: Full-back

Senior career*
Years	Team	Apps	(Gls)
1912–1913	Bede College		
1913–1914	Willington		
1914–1927	Middlesbrough	167	(1)
1928–1929	Darlington	22	(0)
Total		189	(1)
- * Club domestic league appearances and goals

Walter Holmes (9 May 1892 – 1978) was an English footballer who played in the Football League for Darlington and Middlesbrough.
