= Stanley Alvin Watson =

Canadian soldier and educator (1893–1962)

Stanley Alvin Watson DCM and Bar
- Watson in 1920
- Born: 1 June 1893; Orillia, Ontario, Canada
- Died: 6 May 1962; Toronto, Ontario, Canada
- Occupations: Teacher, soldier
- Spouse(s): Teressa Oborne Mullett (m. 1919; died 1923) Lucy Lovell Bate (m. 1927)
- Children: 5
- Military career
- Allegiance: Canada
- Branch: Canadian Expeditionary Force of the British Army; Canadian Army
- Service years: 1915–1918 and 1941–1942
- Rank: First World War; private (1915) to lieutenant (1918); Second World War; lieutenant (1941) to acting-lieutenant-colonel (1942)
- Units: First World War; 157th Battalion; 116th Battalion; 2nd Central Ontario Regimental Depot (England); 8th Reserve Battalion; Canadian Training School (in England for officers); No. 2 Military District Depot (in Canada for demobilization); Second World War; Adjutant-General Directorate of Personnel Selection
- Awards: Distinguished Conduct Medal (1917) and Bar (1918)

Stanley Alvin Watson (1893–1962) was a Canadian soldier who was a field veteran of the First World War and served as an army administrator in the Second World War. In his civilian life, Watson was an educator who trained a cadet company and later transformed the curriculum and instructional techniques of the elementary schools of Ontario. He edited and wrote school textbooks and supplementary materials and published scholarly articles on education.

== Background ==
Stanley A. Watson was born in 1893 to Alexander F. Watson and Adelaide C. Wright in Orillia, Ontario. Watson married Teressa Oborne "Obie" Mullett in 1919 in Orillia. They had three children: Mary (1919), Clifford Gordon (1922), and John (1923). Obie Mullett died in 1923, a few days after giving birth to John. Watson married Lucy Lovell Bate in 1927 in Toronto, Ontario. They had two children: Kenneth Patrick (1929) and Roger (1936). Stanley Watson died in 1962 in Toronto.

== Education ==
Watson attended school in Orillia, where he graduated from Orillia Collegiate Institute (high school). In July 1912, he received a second-class certificate to teach in elementary schools from the Ontario Department of Education following examination at the North Bay Normal School (teacher training college).

Following his service in the First World War, Watson continued his teacher training. During July–August 1919, he attended a refresher course at the University of Toronto for returning soldier-teachers. He attended the University in 1919–1920 to upgrade his teaching qualifications to a first-class certificate. Watson served as president of his class at the Faculty of Education.

Watson subsequently attended the University of Toronto part-time from 1921 until 1927 school year, when he was admitted to the degree of Bachelor of Arts. At Keele Street School in 1927, Watson was the only one to hold a degree.

== Military service ==
=== First World War ===
Watson served as a front-line infantryman in the First World War. He enlisted on 23 December 1915 as a private with the 157th Battalion of the Canadian Expeditionary Force (CEF), which was organized under the Army Act of the United Kingdom as part of the Imperial British Army. His rank was raised to acting-sergeant on 1 March 1916.

The 157th Battalion shipped to England in October 1916. Watson was transferred to the 116th Battalion CEF on 8 December 1916, where his rank was reverted on 9 January 1917 to acting-corporal for administrative reasons and restored on 6 February. His new unit was shipped to France on 11 February 1917. Watson's rank of acting-sergeant was made permanent (substantive) on 1 April 1917.

Watson's platoon wins skills competition

" Orillia, Oct 4 – The 116th Battalion ... was awarded no fewer than 21 medals † for a raid on the German trenches, carried out July last. On this occasion they did a great deal of damage to the enemy and took 53 prisoners, and in thanking the battalion Sir Arthur Currie declared it was 'as successful a raid as had ever been carried out in France'. ...

No. 1 platoon of the 116th Battalion, in which Sergt. Watson and Sergt. McLean ‡ [both from Orillia] are non-commissioned officers, has distinguished itself by winning the brigade and divisional prizes for drill, smartness, and shooting, beating platoons from such crack battalions as the Royal Canadian Regiment and the Princess Pats. The glory won by the 116th has given great satisfaction here, there being upwards of a hundred men from this town in the battalion. Their record reflects much credit, both on the rank and file and on the commanding officer, Lieut.-Col. Sam Sharpe, M.P."

— "Simcoe Soldiers Won Lasting Glory", The Mail and Empire (Toronto), 5 Oct 1917, p. 2.
† 18 to enlisted men, 3 to commissioned officers.
‡ Corporal Donald McLean (Reg. No. 643928) of this platoon was promoted after the 9 August contest to sergeant on 22 August 1917.

On 9 August 1917, the 116th Battalion (of the 9th Infantry Brigade) was represented by its No. 1 Platoon of "A" Company, with Watson as Sergeant, in a skills competition (dress, drill marching, and target shooting) amongst nine battalions from the three brigades of the 3rd Division of the Canadian Corps. The 29 members of Watson's platoon won the competition at Ferfay, France, with 221 points.

In late August 1917, Watson was awarded the Distinguished Conduct Medal (DCM) for "conspicuous gallantry and devotion to duty" during a raid by his battalion on German lines near the village of Avion, France, on the night of 22–23 July. Watson's decoration was authorized on 25 August and announced in a Division Routine Order of 28 August. The investiture of Watson's decoration occurred behind the front lines in a field (Ferme de Berthonval Farm) near Fraser Camp (Mont-Saint-Éloi) on 30 September 1917 when 18 enlisted personnel were honoured for their actions during the July raid. The pinning of the decoration was done by Lieutenant-General Arthur Currie, Commander of the Canadian Corps. Currie declared that the military action was "as successful a raid as had ever been carried out in France". Watson's citation was subsequently published in the Gazette supplement of 26 January 1918 as follows:

" 643986 Sjt. S. A. Watson, Infy.
For conspicuous gallantry and devotion to duty prior to and during an attack. Having previously rendered great assistance in reconnaissance and in cutting wire, he led his platoon on the night of the attack himself, under great difficulties, in the face of heavy shell fire and gas attack. Crawling on his hands and knees, he made two journeys and got his platoon to the jumping-off position, after which he led a bombing party and personally killed a number of the enemy, also bombing many of them out of their dug-outs. He displayed similar gallantry and coolness in guiding his men back through the wire in spite of more gas and heavy shelling."

A more detailed account was given in the War Diary of the 116th Battalion for July 1917.

On 1 March 1918, the 116th Battalion announced that Watson had been awarded a Bar to his Distinguished Conduct Medal (DCM) for the same raid as his original decoration. This Bar signified that his actions during the 1917 raid had merited two DCMs.

Watson was withdrawn from the field near the end of December 1917 and posted to the 2nd Central Ontario Regimental Depot (CORD) in England for the purpose of obtaining a commission as an officer. From February to April 1918, Watson attended the Canadian Training School (CTS) for officers at Bexhill. He was appointed lieutenant by an order of 25 April with effect from 28 April and posted to the 8th Reserve Battalion at Witley for a week. Watson returned to CORD on 4 May and was attached to CTS on 5 May for "instructional duty". He was promoted to Assistant Instructor on 11 July 1918.

Watson left CTS at the end of November 1918 and returned to Canada via the SS Pannonia. of the Cunard Line. The ship departed Avonmouth (Bristol), England, on 30 November and landed at Portland, Maine, on 13 December. He was demobilized in Canada from the No. 2 Military District Depot on 31 December 1918. His war service gratuity of $563 was paid in six installments over an eight-month period in 1919.

==== Retroactive rank in Canadian Militia ====
CEF Ranks versus Militia Ranks

" Ottawa, Ont., Dec. 18 – Recent appointments and promotions in the Canadian militia have created some confusion in the public mind.

On Tuesday last there was issued a list of such appointments and promotions in the higher ranks, including many prominent officers with the Canadian expeditionary force at the front. Such names as those of Brigadier-General Garnet Hughes, Brigadier-General Mercer and others appeared in the Canadian militia gazette list long after word had been received from England that these men had been appointed to such positions. Confusion has been still worse confounded by the fact that in the same issue of the Gazette many of these men appear as having been granted the rank of brevet-colonels.

The explanation given at the Militia Department is that these appointments and promotions are to the Canadian militia. These men are first gazetted as brevet-colonels giving them permanent rank in the Canadian militia. They are then gazetted brigadier-generals, giving them the temporary rank in the Canadian militia equal to that which they have earned in the Canadian expeditionary forces in Great Britain."

— The Toronto Star, 18 Dec 1915, p. 5.

In June 1919, Watson was retroactively granted the rank of temporary-lieutenant in the Canadian Militia for the past period of his officer commission in the Canadian Expeditionary Force (CEF), 28 April to 31 December 1918. The Militia was organized under Canada's Militia Act for the defence of Canada, while the CEF was organized under the UK Army Act for action in Europe. Their ranks were entirely separate hierarchies.

==== Veterans' associations ====
While at the University of Toronto during 1919–1920, Watson served as president of the Veterans' Teachers' Association formed by his refresher-course classmates and as the representative of education students on the executive council of the University Veterans' Association of Toronto. Thereafter, he served as secretary of the teacher organization.

=== Second World War ===
In October 1941, Watson joined the Canadian Army, where he resumed his old rank of lieutenant. He was promoted in November 1941 to acting-major and then in June 1942 to acting-lieutenant-colonel.

Watson worked in the Adjutant-General (AG) Branch, where he served with the Directorate of Personnel Selection as a regional chief examiner (November 1941) in Toronto to administer a new system of matching recruits with suitable roles. He was moved to Winnipeg in April 1942 as an interim replacement for the retired chief examiner there.

In June 1942, Watson was transferred to National Defence Headquarters, Ottawa, and appointed an Assistant Adjutant-General (AAG). Watson gave up his AAG position in August 1942 but retained his acting-lieutenant-colonel rank. He retired from the military in September 1942 for medical reasons. Watson was subsequently known by his AG rank of acting-lieutenant-colonel and was addressed as colonel.

== Education career ==
Watson's first teaching position was at Orillia Township School No. 2 beginning September 1912. He was the sole teacher with an average attendance of 19 students during the two school years that ended June 1914. By September 1915, Watson moved to the Model School in the Town of Orillia, where he was one of 12 instructors for people training to obtain a third-class teaching certificate.

Following his war service and full-time attendance at the University of Toronto (December 1915 – June 1920), Watson resumed his teaching career in September 1920 at Keele Street School in the Toronto Board of Education. He moved from Keele Street School to Brock Avenue School for January 1931. Watson was then promoted to principal at Deer Park School for September 1931 and returned as principal to Keele Street School for September 1932. He moved as principal to Essex Street School for September 1937.

In addition to his regular teaching position, Watson worked from 1921 to 1931 (October to March terms) at the Ogden Night School in the Toronto Board. He was promoted to principal of the night school for October 1927 onwards. This school specialized in the teaching of English to immigrants and was highly regarded for its strategy of focusing on oral work prior to the introduction of the written language.

During his time at Keele Street School, Watson became known as an advocate for "modern education". This philosophy focused on children as individuals with active involvement in their learning through guided, practical activities, rather than treating them as passive, generic recipients of factual knowledge from a teacher. Active citizenship was also part of the new system. Starting in December 1936, Watson was employed by the Ontario Department of Education as a curriculum writer and promoter in the implementation of the philosophy across the elementary school system of Ontario. (See § Curriculum development.)

Watson was seconded in September 1940 by the Ontario Department of Education from his position at Essex Street School to teach at the Toronto Normal School (teacher training college). In October 1941, he was granted a leave of absence to enlist with the Canadian Army. He returned to the Toronto Normal School in January 1943 following his military service.

In September 1943, Watson became the Department's Acting Inspector of Public Schools for Simcoe County South. He returned to the Toronto Normal School in February 1944 and was appointed principal of the Ottawa Normal School for 1 September 1944. Watson was promoted on 1 January 1946 to the position of Assistant Superintendent of Elementary Education. He was further promoted on 1 November 1956 as the first Superintendent of Curriculum and Textbooks in a newly established branch of the Department of Education. He retired on 31 October 1960.

=== Keele Street School Cadet Company ===
Keele Street School Cadet Company, May 1917

Following his arrival in 1920 at Keele Street School, Watson joined its principal, W. H. Harwood, as an instructor for the school's cadet company. In September 1921, Watson became a lieutenant in the Corps of School Cadet Instructors of the Canadian Militia. (Note: Military District No. 2 (Central Ontario), Cadet Corps No. 55 (Toronto Public Schools Cadet Regiment).)

Watson was a successful instructor whose Keele Street School Cadet Company won several awards over a number of years. In 1927, his cadet company received the following honours:

- Lord Roberts Flag (Note: Also known as the Earl Roberts Flag.) (for the fifth consecutive year) for greatest efficiency in drill movements during the annual competition amongst the elementary-school cadets of Toronto (award established 1907, with the flag donated for the purpose by the cadet corps of a London, UK, school). (Note: The title Lord Roberts Flag was also used for a large Union Jack inscribed Loyal Canada and donated by the Imperial Colonial Club of London (UK). This flag was first presented in March 1909 (for 1908) to the high school attended by the captain of Canada's team in the British Empire competition (established 1908) for the annual Lord Roberts Trophy for cadet rifle-shooting. The trophy itself had been presented for a UK competition prior to 1908.)
- John Wanless Cup (for the fifth consecutive year) for greatest general proficiency in all areas (drill, shooting, etc.) during the annual competition amongst the elementary-school cadets of the City (award established 1923 by John Wanless, Trustee of the Toronto Board of Education).
- Anna Otter Challenge Cup for "the best disciplined company in the best battalion" amongst the elementary schools of Toronto (award established 1927 by General Sir William Dillon Otter (retired) in honour of his mother).
- Canadian National Exhibition Cup for "the best cadet company in the cadet parade" at the annual exhibition (the second year of the cadet parade).
- Inspector Armstrong Flag (Note: G.H. Armstrong was the Toronto School Board Inspector for its western district.) for best drill during the annual inspection of elementary-school cadets in the western part of the City of Toronto. (The Keele Street Cadets also received the Inspector Armstrong Flag in 1923 and 1926.)

In September 1928, the Keele Cadets received the Anna Otter Cup and the Commercial Travellers' Association Flag as the best cadet company in the CNE parade.

On 23 September 1942, Watson was retired for medical reasons from his lieutenant position in the Cadet Services of Canada. He was given the retirement militia rank of major.

=== Layolomi Lodge ===
Layolomi Lodge – " That camp, with its granite outcrops and enveloping forest of pine and birch, was built on a mythology of self-reliance within the beauty and power of nature. It informed the confidence and sense of connection to the earth that seems to have been shared by the whole [Watson] family. ... The confidence [my brother] expressed in me from the beginning was persuasive. Much of that encouragement took place among the granite and pine and sand and water of Layolomi, and the constant invitation to adventure and experiment the place offered; ever since, the Precambrian landscape has been invested with power, nourishment, and a sense of the rightness of the world."

— Patrick Watson. This Hour has Seven Decades. 2004. pp. 2–3.

Watson was a director of Layolomi Lodge (also known as Camp Layolomi), attended annually by his children. This summer camp facility for boys was organized by a group of Toronto teachers and located on Lake Bernard near Sundridge, Ontario, and Algonquin Park.

=== Curriculum development ===
From December 1936 through mid-1939, Watson worked with Thornton Mustard of the Toronto Normal School as a two-person committee tasked by the Ontario Department of Education with modernizing the Province's elementary school curriculum. The philosophy of the new curriculum reflected programmes already introduced in other provinces. (Note: Saskatchewan (1931), Nova Scotia (1934), Alberta (1936), British Columbia and Yukon (1936). (Manitoba and New Brunswick followed in 1939.)) Mustard and Watson gave special credit to the influence of the Hadow Reports of the United Kingdom. The new provincial courses of study were described as "revolutionary" and "a fundamental change in educational philosophy" in Canada. Using feedback received, Watson continued to revise Ontario's new curriculum into the early 1940s. (See § Curricula below.)

The central theme of the new curriculum was the recognition and development of the abilities and potential of each child as an individual for the purpose of producing a better citizen. This philosophy replaced the previous strict adherence to uniform standards with success measured by formal examinations on factual course content. In addition, the new program was to provide students with a practical education rather than simply be a preparation and filter for university studies.

Courses in the new curriculum placed greater emphasis on active participation by students, including project-based learning, practical applications, discovery through experimentation and investigation, and an increase in their independent reading. History, geography, and civics were merged as social studies, and the material was coordinated thematically. Art was to be integrated into the work done for other subjects.

Teachers were given greater freedom in choosing the materials covered and the manner of their presentation. There was also greater flexibility in the time spent per topic, with an emphasis placed on English and social studies. (Note: The suggested breakdown of the time spent on subjects was as follows: English 30%, social studies 20%, health 10%, natural sciences 10%, arithmetic/mathematics 10%, music 10%, and art 10%.) Written tests and examinations were de-emphasized, with locally produced evaluations used in place of external, standardized papers.

==== New Brunswick ====
In 1937, 1939, and 1941, Watson gave a series of lectures to teachers in the Province of New Brunswick on the philosophy and principles of the new curriculum. These lectures were part of the summer professional programs of the New Brunswick Department of Education. The Province introduced its version of the new curriculum in September 1939.

==== Canadian textbooks ====
Watson became active by 1950 in a long-term process of replacing foreign textbooks in Ontario classrooms with Canadian publications. The intention was to remove foreign bias, viewpoints, and vocabulary from all aspects of the curriculum. Watson spoke publicly on the textbook policy at meetings of parents, educational organizations, and legislators, as well as with the media. On 1 November 1956, he became Ontario's first Superintendent of Curriculum and Textbooks.

== Tributes to Watson as an educator ==
Watson's view of children was praised in a report published in 1939 in a number of New Brunswick newspapers:

" Mr. Watson has a very appealing way of talking about children as real persons, as human beings, not automatons, as individuals and not as an insignificant unit of a mass-production scheme. It is part and parcel of the new order of things, the treating of a child as an individual in the new curriculum."

A tribute to Stanley Watson was included in the Report of the Minister of Education for 1960:

" Mr. Watson's achievements have been characterized by a breadth of scholarship, an understanding of students, and a sense of humour, which have earned him the esteem of countless teachers, superintendents, and scholars across Canada and abroad. As Superintendent of Curriculum and Text-books for Ontario, visiting lecturer at the University of British Columbia, curriculum consultant in New Brunswick, chairman of the Committee of Directors of Curriculum for the Canadian Education Association, adviser to authors and publishers, he has made lasting contributions to Canadian education. Perhaps foremost of these contributions is the growing prestige of Canadian text-books now appearing in Ontario classrooms."

In 1964, the Ontario Association for Curriculum Development established the Colonel Watson Award in memory of Stanley Watson. The citation described Watson as "responsible for implementing many curriculum changes that encouraged flexibility in classroom practices". The award was presented annually to "a prominent educator who has made a significant contribution to education and curriculum development in Ontario" with a notable impact on the teaching-learning process at the provincial or regional level.

== Publications ==
Watson served as an editor for a number of school textbooks and manuals. At times, this work was done anonymously, both within the Department of Education and with private publishers. A catalogue of Canadian books for 1921–1949 listed only English for New-comers, Riding With the Sun, and Over Land and Sea as published works by Stanley Watson. The Teacher's Guides and Student Workbooks were not listed.

=== Curricula ===
- Thornton Mustard and Stanley A. Watson, Programme of Studies for Grades I to VI of the Public and Separate Schools, 1937. Ontario Minister of Education. (Revised 1938, 1939, 1940, 1941.)
- Thornton Mustard and Stanley A. Watson Programme of Studies for Grades VII and VIII of the Public and Separate Schools, 1938. Ontario Minister of Education. (Revised 1939, 1940, 1942.)

=== Books ===
- Basil M. McLean and Stanley A. Watson, English for New-comers: A handbook for new-comers and their teachers. Toronto: Thomas Nelson and Sons, Ltd., 1931.

==== Highroads to Reading series ====
- Riding with the Sun (Book 4). 1946. Compiled and edited by S. A. Watson, Lucy Bate and Dorothy Ryan.
- Over Land and Sea (Book 5). 1948. Compiled and edited by S. A. Watson, Lucy Bate, and Joyce Boyle.
- On the Beam (Book 6). 1950. Compiled and edited by S. A. Watson, Lucy Bate, and Joyce Boyle.
- Guide to Riding with the Sun (Book 4). 1947. S. A. Watson, Lucy Bate, Joyce Boyle, Helene Rothwell, and Dorothy Ryan.
- Guide to Over Land and Sea (Book 5). 1950. S. A. Watson, Lucy Bate, and Joyce Boyle.
- Guide to On the Beam (Book 6). 1950. S. A. Watson, Lucy Bate, Joyce Boyle, and Dorothy Ryan.
- Workbook to Accompany Riding with the Sun. S. A. Watson, et al.
- Workbook: Over Land and Sea. S. A. Watson, et al.
- Workbook: On the Beam. S. A. Watson, et al.

=== Articles ===
- "Find the Highest Common Factor", reproduced from The School in "Is Our Education Sufficiently Practical?", Port Perry Star, 29 Jan 1925, p. 1.
- "Is the Rôle of the Teacher Changing?", Understanding the Child, The National Committee for Mental Hygiene (USA), New York, Apr 1937, Vol. 6, No. 1, pp. 20–23.
- "The Classroom Magazine", The School, Elementary Edition, Ontario College of Education, University of Toronto (The School, E. Ed.), Apr 1938, Vol. 26, No. 8, pp. 667–670.
- "Social Studies" [in Ontario's new elementary-school curriculum], The Canadian Bookman, Apr-May 1939, Vol. 21, No. 1, pp. 27–31.
- "New Inspector Finds the School", The School, E. Ed., Jan 1945, Vol. 33, No. 5, pp. 378–379.

==== Reviewing literature on the mental health of students ====
- "With Books and Magazines" (1940–1941), Understanding the Child, The National Committee for Mental Hygiene (USA), New York, Jun 1940, Vol. 9, No. 2, pp. 29–31; Oct 1940, Vol. 9, No. 3, pp. 29–31; Jan 1941, Vol. 9, No. 4, pp. 33–35; Apr 1941, Vol. 10, No. 1, pp. 28–30; Jun 1941, Vol. 10, No. 2, pp. 30–32.

==== Arithmetic (1935–1937) ====
- "Arithmetic, Junior Third to Senior Fourth (Grades V-VIII)", The School, E. Ed., Sep 1935–Apr 1936, Jun 1936, Vol. 24, No. 1–8, 10, pp. 27–33, 117–121, 202–209, 299–303, 393–397, 486–489, 577–583, 669–672, and 851–856. (50 pages across 9 issues)
- "Revising the Course in Arithmetic", The School, E. Ed., May 1936, Vol. 24, No. 9, pp. 757–766.
- "Arithmetic for Grades V-VIII", The School, E. Ed., Nov 1936, Vol. 25, No. 3, pp. 209–212; Dec 1936, Vol. 25, No. 4, pp. 301–306.
- "The Selection of Problem Material in Arithmetic for Grades V-VIII", The School, E. Ed., Jan 1937, Vol. 25, No. 5, pp. 397–399.
- "Arithmetic, Grades V-VIII", The School, E. Ed., Feb 1937, Vol. 25, No. 6, pp. 489–493.
- "The Invention of the Decimal Fraction", The School, E. Ed., Mar 1937, Vol. 25, No. 7, pp. 577–579.

== Reference notes ==
Abbreviations used: LAC – Library and Archives Canada. MOMFC – Ministry of the Overseas Military Forces of Canada fonds.
