= Fred Watson (Scottish footballer) =

Scottish footballer

Personal information
- Full name: Frederick Watson
- Date of birth: 30 November 1888
- Place of birth: Aberdeen, Scotland
- Date of death: 29 June 1917 (aged 28)
- Height: 5 ft 9 in (1.75 m)
- Position: Wing half

Senior career*
Years	Team	Apps	(Gls)
–1910	Aberdeen Shamrock		
1910–1917	Aberdeen	1	(0)
- * Club domestic league appearances and goals

Frederick Watson (30 November 1888 – 29 June 1917) was a Scottish professional football wing half who played in the Scottish League for Aberdeen.

== Personal life ==
Watson served as a trimmer in the Royal Naval Reserve during the First World War and died of heart failure on 29 June 1917. He was buried in St. Peter's Cemetery, Aberdeen.

== Career statistics ==
Appearances and goals by club, season and competition
Club	Season	League			Scottish Cup		Other		Total	
Club	Season	Division	Apps	Goals	Apps	Goals	Apps	Goals	Apps	Goals
Aberdeen	1911–12	Scottish First Division	0	0	0	0	1 (Note: Appearance in Fleming Charity Shield)	0	1	0
Aberdeen	1912–13	Scottish First Division	1	0	0	0	0	0	1	0
Aberdeen	1913–14	Scottish First Division	0	0	0	0	1 (Note: Appearance in Robertson Cup)	0	1	0
Career total			1	0	0	0	2	0	3	0
