= Lewis Watson =

Lewis Watson may refer to:

- Lewis Watson (athlete) (1895–1961), American Olympic athlete
- Lewis Watson (musician) (born 1992), English singer-songwriter
- Lewis Watson, 1st Baron Rockingham (1584–1653), English landowner and politician
- Lewis Watson, 1st Earl of Rockingham (1655–1724), English peer and politician
- Lewis Watson, 2nd Earl of Rockingham (1714–1745), English peer and politician, grandson of the above
- Lewis Watson, 1st Baron Sondes (1728–1795), British Member of Parliament for Kent
- Lewis Watson, 2nd Baron Sondes (1754–1806), British Whig politician and peer
- Lewis Watson, 3rd Baron Sondes (1792–1836), English peer
- Lewis Findlay Watson (1819–1890), U.S. Representative from Pennsylvania

== See also ==
- Louis H. Watson (1906–1936), American contract bridge player and writer
- Louis L. Watson (1895–?), American college football player and coach
