= Fred Watson (Australian footballer) =

Australian rules footballer

Personal information
- Full name: Frederick George Watson
- Born: 3 March 1882; Hawthorn, Victoria
- Died: 8 July 1968 (aged 86); Bairnsdale, Victoria

Playing career^{1}
Years	Club	Games (Goals)
1903	Melbourne	1 (0)
- ^{1} Playing statistics correct to the end of 1903.

Frederick George Watson (3 March 1882 – 8 July 1968) was an Australian rules footballer who played with Melbourne in the Victorian Football League (VFL).
