= Anthony Watson (admiral) =

American naval officer

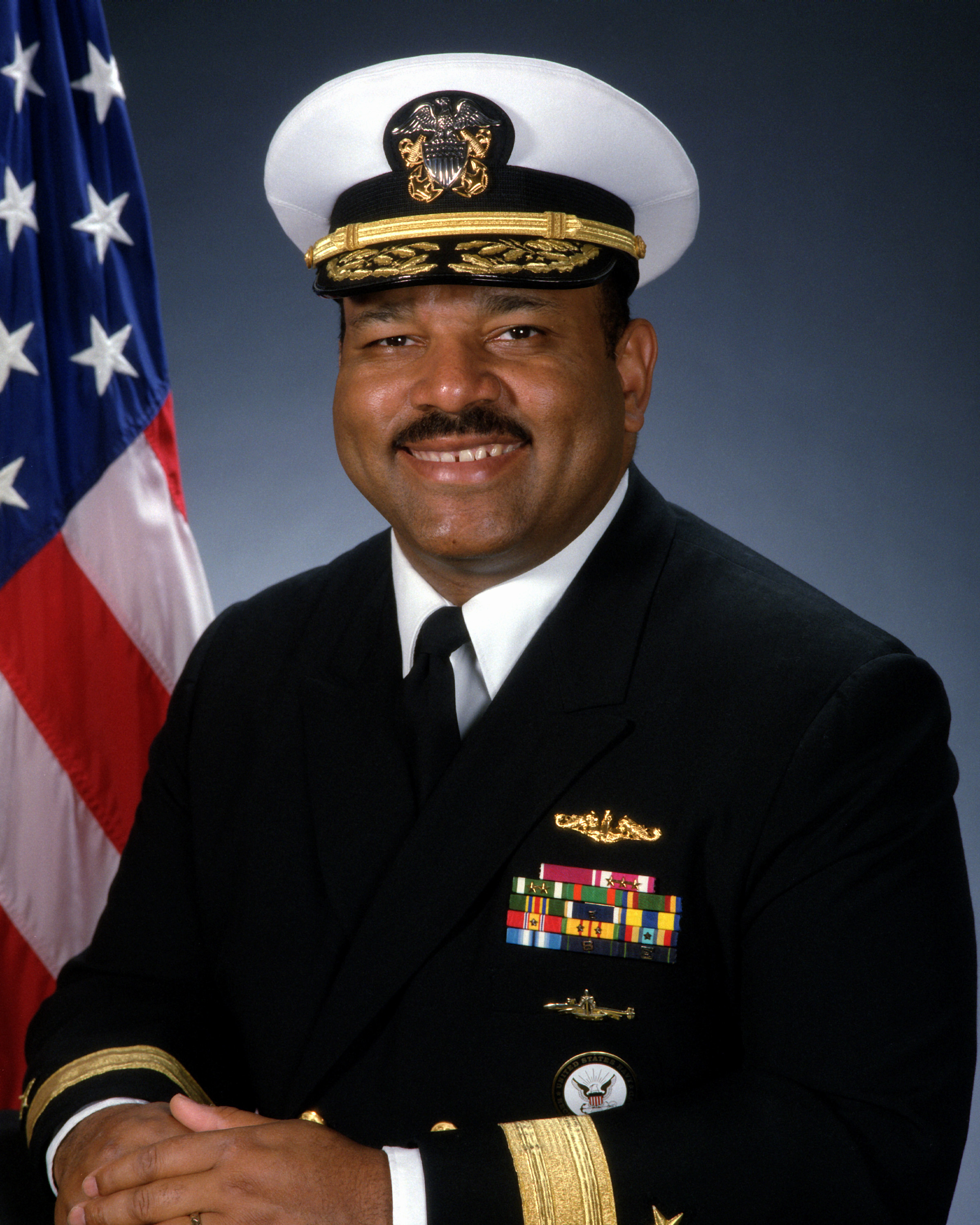
Rear Adm. Watson in 1995

Anthony John "Tony" Watson (born May 18, 1949 in Chicago) is a retired 31-year Navy veteran and a graduate of the Naval Academy (1970). He is one of the "Centennial Seven" African-American sailors who served as commanding officers of United States submarines in the 20th century. He was the first black submariner to be promoted to rear admiral. He served on five different submarines and became the second African-American naval officer to command a nuclear submarine in December 1987. He was raised in the public housing community of Cabrini-Green on the near north side of Chicago, where he graduated from Lane Technical High School in 1966.

At the U. S. Naval Academy in Annapolis, Maryland, he was twice elected class president and was the first African American to achieve the rank of Brigade Commander as a third year midshipman.

He was Commanding Officer, USS Jacksonville, a Los Angeles Class fast-attack nuclear submarine, where he conducted the first live-fire, at-sea depth charge test of a submarine since USS Thresher in 1963. From 1989 to 1992, he was Deputy Commandant of Midshipmen at the Naval Academy. In 1992, he was commander of Submarine Squadron Seven in Pearl Harbor, Hawaii, with 13 fast attack nuclear submarines under his command.

As rear admiral he was assigned to the Pentagon where he worked under General Colin Powell who was then Chairman of the Joint Chiefs of Staff. Following that tour of duty, he was also Commander of the Navy Recruiting Command, an operation with a recruiting team of 6000 people nationwide.

His military awards include the Defense Superior Service Medal, the Legion of Merit, four Meritorious Service medals, three Navy Commendation Medals, the Navy Achievement Medal.

== Personal ==
Watson is the son of John David Watson and Virginia Hortence (Smith) Watson. On July 21, 1984, he married his second wife Sharon Gray (Shires) Waddell in Norfolk, Virginia.
