= Clifford Watson =

English rugby league player

Personal information
- Full name: Clifford Watson
- Born: Unknown

Playing information
- Position: Stand-off
Club
Years	Team	Pld	T	G	FG	P
1967–70	Keighley
1970–73	Hunslet	70	16	1	0	50
	Total	70	16	1	0	50

Clifford Watson is a former professional rugby league footballer who played in the 1960s and 1970s. He played at club level for Keighley, and Hunslet, as a stand-off.
