= Bradley C. S. Watson =

Canadian-born American political science educator

Bradley C. S. Watson is a Canadian-born American political science educator, lawyer, and writer, and a member of the "West Coast Straussian" school of political thought.

He holds the William and Berniece Grewcock Chair in Politics at Hillsdale College's Van Andel Graduate School of Government in Washington, D.C. Prior to that, he was professor of politics at Saint Vincent College in Latrobe, Pennsylvania, where he held the Philip M. McKenna Chair in American and Western Political Thought. He was co-director of the college's Center for Political and Economic Thought, a public policy educational and research institute dedicated to advancing "scholarship on philosophical and policy concerns related to freedom and Western civilization with particular regard to the American experience". In 2022, he resigned from Saint Vincent to protest administrative actions following a campus uproar over a speaker invited to the Center. Within weeks, he was recruited by Hillsdale for their Graduate School of Government.

He has held visiting faculty appointments at the Hoover Institution at Stanford University, the Social Philosophy and Policy Center at Bowling Green State University, the James Madison Program in American Ideals and Institutions at Princeton University, and Claremont McKenna College. He is a Senior Fellow of the Claremont Institute, a longtime board member of the National Association of Scholars, and a past president of The Philadelphia Society.

He was born in Toronto and educated in Canada, Belgium, and the United States, earning a B.A. from the University of British Columbia in Vancouver, a J.D. from Queen's University Faculty of Law in Kingston, Ontario, an M.Phil. from the Institute of Philosophy, University of Leuven (Louvain), Belgium, and an M.A. and Ph.D. from the Claremont Graduate University in California.

His publications concentrate on several themes: the unfolding of the liberal idea in the modern world, particularly through courts of law; the problems and prospects of higher education, particularly civic education, in liberal societies; and the strengths and weaknesses of the West in the face of an illiberal foe—Islamism.

Watson is a critic of American progressivism. His books include Progressivism: The Strange History of a Radical Idea, and Progressive Challenges to the American Constitution: A New Republic. He has appeared on the Glenn Beck television program to discuss his book Living Constitution, Dying Faith: Progressivism and the New Science of Jurisprudence. He has argued that the idea of a "living constitution," which he traces largely to social Darwinism and pragmatism, undermines the American founders' Constitution dedicated to fixed natural truths, and is a slippery slope toward moral and political nihilism He has also been critical of both legal positivism and the deontological liberalism of John Rawls, arguing that they fail to provide a stable foundation for constitutional interpretation, and of same-sex marriage, arguing that it is antithetical to moral realism and essentialism.

Although West Coast Straussianism is usually understood to be a version of political conservatism, Watson has been attacked from various points on the conservative spectrum, including by Harry V. Jaffa, the acknowledged founder of the West Coast Straussians. Jaffa has suggested that Watson is insufficiently critical of the legal positivism of conservative Judge Robert H. Bork, while others have suggested he is too critical. Meanwhile, traditionalist conservatives have denied Watson's claim that universal philosophical principles played an important role in the American founding.

Watson has defended both natural rights philosophy and cultural traditions as essential elements of the American experience, and of a complete understanding of the U.S. Constitution.
