= Hale County, Alabama =

County in Alabama, United States

- County
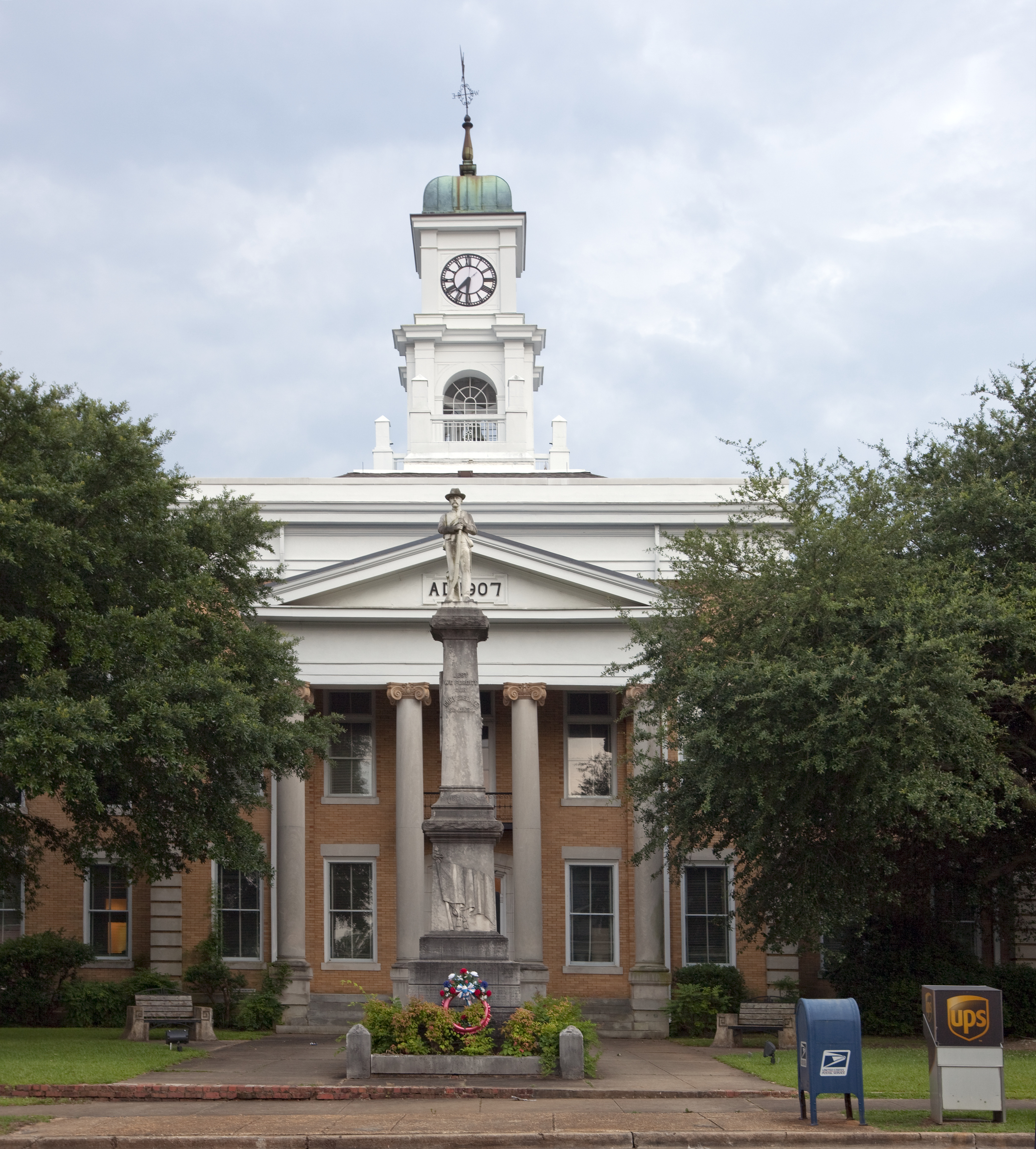
- Hale County Courthouse and Confederate statue in Greensboro

- Logo

- Location within the U.S. state of Alabama
- Coordinates: 32°45′39″N 87°37′47″W
- Country: United States
- State: Alabama
- Founded: January 30, 1867
- Named for: Stephen F. Hale
- Seat: Greensboro
- Largest city: Moundville

Area
  - Total: 657 sq mi (1,700 km^{2})
  - Land: 644 sq mi (1,670 km^{2})
  - Water: 13 sq mi (34 km^{2}) 1.9%

Population (2020)
  - Total: 14,785
  - Estimate (2025): 15,194 ▲
  - Density: 23.0/sq mi (8.86/km^{2})
- Time zone: UTC−6 (Central)
  - Summer (DST): UTC−5 (CDT)
- Congressional district: 7th
- Website: www.halecountyal.gov
- County Number 36 on Alabama Licence Plates

Hale County is a county located in the west central portion of the U.S. state of Alabama. As of the 2020 census, the population was 14,785. Its county seat is Greensboro. It is named in honor of Confederate officer Stephen Fowler Hale.

Hale County is part of the Tuscaloosa, Alabama metropolitan area.

== History ==
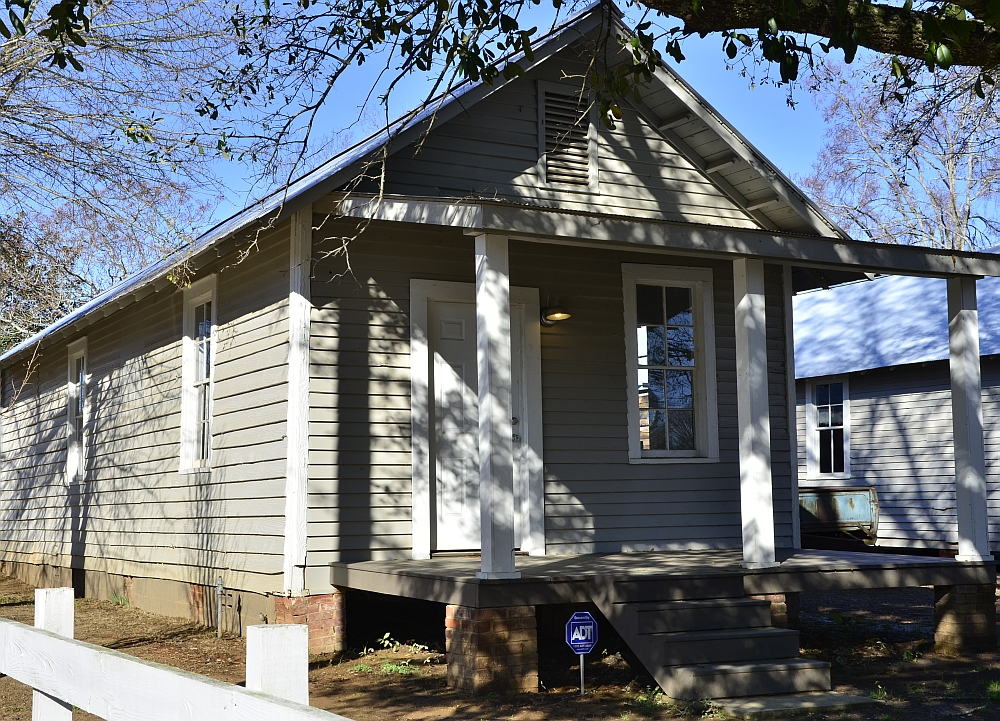
The Safe House Museum in Greensboro; in 1968 its owner sheltered Martin Luther King Jr. from Ku Klux Klan members in the area

Hale County was established following the end of the American Civil War, on January 30, 1867. Located in the west-central section of the state, it was created from portions of Greene, Marengo, Perry, and Tuscaloosa counties. The vast majority of the territory came from Greene County. The first American settlers in this area had been southerners migrating from Georgia, Tennessee, Kentucky, and the Carolinas.

Hale County is connected to three major twentieth-century artists: Walker Evans photographed the area in 1936 while he collaborated with James Agee on the 1941 book Let Us Now Praise Famous Men. Starting in the 1960s, artist William Christenberry, born in Tuscaloosa, photographed various structures in Hale County as part of his multi-media artistic investigations. More recently, Hale County has become the home of the nationally recognized Auburn University Rural Studio, an architectural outreach program founded by architect and artist Samuel Mockbee and D. K. Ruth. It is also the birthplace of Eugene Sawyer, the second African American mayor of Chicago. In 2019 the film Hale County This Morning, This Evening by artist RaMell Ross was nominated for an Academy Award for Best Documentary Feature, poetically addressing the region's shift in demographics and the power of intra-community authorship.

Since the American Civil War, whites have controlled much of the economic and political power in Hale County, enforced early by violence and later by the decades of disenfranchisement of black voters and statewide imposition of Jim Crow. In the first half of the 20th century, many African Americans left the county in two waves of migration to cities and northern and western industrial centers. Beginning in the late 1960s, they recovered the ability to vote.

In 1997, after a highly contested mayoral election, the city of Greensboro elected its first black mayor, John E. Owens Jr. Claude Hamilton, the first African-American chief of police, was appointed in 2000. In 2006, black and white county residents joined in electing the first black county sheriff, Kenneth W. Ellis, who was formerly the Moundville police chief.

Hale County has suffered economic decline, particularly in the southern more rural end of the county. Many manufacturing plants closed during late 20th century restructuring, and population and businesses declined with the loss of jobs, especially in and around Greensboro (the county seat). The northern portion of the county, however, has enjoyed population and industrial growth due to its proximity to Tuscaloosa County. The latter has been a growing center of industry and new businesses, anchored by the University of Alabama and its large student body and resources.

== Geography ==
According to the United States Census Bureau, the county has a total area of 657 square miles (1,700 km^{2}), of which 644 square miles (1,670 km^{2}) is land and 13 square miles (34 km^{2}) (1.9%) is water.

=== Adjacent counties ===
- Tuscaloosa County (north)
- Bibb County (northeast)
- Perry County (southeast)
- Marengo County (south)
- Greene County (west)

=== National protected area ===
- Talladega National Forest (part)

== Demographics ==
Historical population
| Census | Pop. | Note | %± |
|---|---|---|---|
| 1870 | 21,792 | | — |
| 1880 | 26,553 | | 21.8% |
| 1890 | 27,501 | | 3.6% |
| 1900 | 31,011 | | 12.8% |
| 1910 | 27,883 | | −10.1% |
| 1920 | 24,289 | | −12.9% |
| 1930 | 26,265 | | 8.1% |
| 1940 | 25,533 | | −2.8% |
| 1950 | 20,832 | | −18.4% |
| 1960 | 19,537 | | −6.2% |
| 1970 | 15,888 | | −18.7% |
| 1980 | 15,604 | | −1.8% |
| 1990 | 15,498 | | −0.7% |
| 2000 | 17,185 | | 10.9% |
| 2010 | 15,760 | | −8.3% |
| 2020 | 14,785 | | −6.2% |
| 2025 (est.) | 15,194 | ▲ | 2.8% |
U.S. Decennial Census; 1790–1960 1900–1990; 1990–2000 2010–2020

=== 2020 census ===
As of the 2020 census, the county had a population of 14,785. The median age was 42.1 years. 22.3% of residents were under the age of 18 and 19.1% of residents were 65 years of age or older. For every 100 females there were 89.4 males, and for every 100 females age 18 and over there were 84.0 males age 18 and over.

The racial makeup of the county was 40.6% White, 56.4% Black or African American, 0.3% American Indian and Alaska Native, 0.2% Asian, 0.1% Native Hawaiian and Pacific Islander, 0.4% from some other race, and 2.1% from two or more races. Hispanic or Latino residents of any race comprised 1.0% of the population.

0.0% of residents lived in urban areas, while 100.0% lived in rural areas.

There were 6,138 households in the county, of which 29.8% had children under the age of 18 living with them and 38.2% had a female householder with no spouse or partner present. About 32.2% of all households were made up of individuals and 13.5% had someone living alone who was 65 years of age or older.

There were 7,399 housing units, of which 17.0% were vacant. Among occupied housing units, 75.5% were owner-occupied and 24.5% were renter-occupied. The homeowner vacancy rate was 1.2% and the rental vacancy rate was 5.9%.

=== Racial and ethnic composition ===
Hale County, Alabama – Racial and ethnic composition Note: the US Census treats Hispanic/Latino as an ethnic category. This table excludes Latinos from the racial categories and assigns them to a separate category. Hispanics/Latinos may be of any race.
| Race / Ethnicity (NH = Non-Hispanic) | Pop 2000 | Pop 2010 | Pop 2020 | % 2000 | % 2010 | % 2020 |
|---|---|---|---|---|---|---|
| White alone (NH) | 6,803 | 6,213 | 5,792 | 39.59% | 39.42% | 40.39% |
| Black or African American alone (NH) | 10,074 | 9,265 | 8,313 | 58.62% | 58.79% | 56.23% |
| Native American or Alaska Native alone (NH) | 30 | 23 | 34 | 0.17% | 0.15% | 0.23% |
| Asian alone (NH) | 25 | 35 | 18 | 0.15% | 0.22% | 0.12% |
| Pacific Islander alone (NH) | 4 | 1 | 5 | 0.02% | 0.01% | 0.03% |
| Other race alone (NH) | 11 | 7 | 23 | 0.06% | 0.04% | 0.16% |
| Mixed race or Multiracial (NH) | 81 | 76 | 271 | 0.47% | 0.48% | 1.83% |
| Hispanic or Latino (any race) | 157 | 140 | 149 | 0.91% | 0.89% | 1.01% |
| Total | 17,185 | 15,760 | 14,785 | 100.00% | 100.00% | 100.00% |

=== 2010 census ===
As of the 2010 United States census, there were 15,760 people living in the county. 59.0% were Black or African American, 39.8% White, 0.2% Asian, 0.2% Native American, 0.3% of some other race and 0.6% of two or more races. 0.9% were Hispanic or Latino (of any race).

=== 2000 census ===
As of the census of 2000, there were 17,185 people, 6,415 households, and 4,605 families living in the county. The population density was 27 people per square mile (10 people/km^{2}). There were 7,756 housing units at an average density of 12 units per square mile (4.6 units/km^{2}). The racial makeup of the county was 39.83% White, 58.95% Black or African American, 0.17% Native American, 0.16% Asian, 0.02% Pacific Islander, 0.29% from other races, and 0.58% from two or more races. 0.91% of the population were Hispanic or Latino of any race.

There were 6,415 households, out of which 36.50% had children under the age of 18 living with them, 45.60% were married couples living together, 22.00% had a female householder with no husband present, and 28.20% were non-families. 26.40% of all households were made up of individuals, and 10.90% had someone living alone who was 65 years of age or older. The average household size was 2.63 and the average family size was 3.19.

In the county, the population was spread out, with 29.60% under the age of 18, 9.10% from 18 to 24, 26.70% from 25 to 44, 21.10% from 45 to 64, and 13.50% who were 65 years of age or older. The median age was 34 years. For every 100 females, there were 89.40 males. For every 100 females age 18 and over, there were 83.60 males.

The median income for a household in the county was $25,807, and the median income for a family was $31,875. Males had a median income of $28,493 versus $19,363 for females. The per capita income for the county was $12,661. About 22.20% of families and 26.90% of the population were below the poverty line, including 34.00% of those under age 18 and 26.70% of those age 65 or over.

== Government and infrastructure ==
The Farquhar Cattle Ranch, a former Alabama Department of Corrections facility for men, was in an unincorporated area of the county, about 8 miles (13 km) east of Greensboro.

Hale County is reliably Democratic at the presidential level. The last Republican to win the county in a presidential election is Richard Nixon, who won it by a majority in 1972. The 2024 election saw a significant narrowing of the Democratic victory in the county, with Donald Trump obtaining over 46% of the vote. This was the closest that a Republican candidate has come to winning the county since 1972.

United States presidential election results for Hale County, Alabama
| Year | Republican | | Democratic | | Third party(ies) | |
| Year | No. | % | No. | % | No. | % |
|---|---|---|---|---|---|---|
| 1868 | 3,297 | 79.20% | 866 | 20.80% | 0 | 0.00% |
| 1872 | 3,665 | 82.05% | 802 | 17.95% | 0 | 0.00% |
| 1876 | 2,388 | 52.31% | 2,177 | 47.69% | 0 | 0.00% |
| 1880 | 1,549 | 47.15% | 1,736 | 52.85% | 0 | 0.00% |
| 1884 | 2,203 | 53.16% | 1,925 | 46.45% | 16 | 0.39% |
| 1888 | 1,478 | 33.59% | 2,914 | 66.23% | 8 | 0.18% |
| 1892 | 121 | 2.82% | 3,350 | 78.03% | 822 | 19.15% |
| 1896 | 933 | 23.57% | 2,906 | 73.40% | 120 | 3.03% |
| 1900 | 348 | 17.92% | 1,563 | 80.48% | 31 | 1.60% |
| 1904 | 27 | 3.59% | 723 | 96.02% | 3 | 0.40% |
| 1908 | 13 | 1.78% | 714 | 97.81% | 3 | 0.41% |
| 1912 | 4 | 0.55% | 720 | 98.50% | 7 | 0.96% |
| 1916 | 15 | 1.85% | 795 | 97.79% | 3 | 0.37% |
| 1920 | 18 | 1.85% | 953 | 97.74% | 4 | 0.41% |
| 1924 | 23 | 2.60% | 856 | 96.72% | 6 | 0.68% |
| 1928 | 403 | 27.77% | 1,048 | 72.23% | 0 | 0.00% |
| 1932 | 70 | 5.19% | 1,275 | 94.58% | 3 | 0.22% |
| 1936 | 20 | 1.21% | 1,626 | 98.31% | 8 | 0.48% |
| 1940 | 32 | 1.86% | 1,691 | 98.14% | 0 | 0.00% |
| 1944 | 33 | 2.54% | 1,265 | 97.46% | 0 | 0.00% |
| 1948 | 43 | 3.96% | 0 | 0.00% | 1,044 | 96.04% |
| 1952 | 758 | 38.44% | 1,210 | 61.36% | 4 | 0.20% |
| 1956 | 504 | 26.29% | 1,314 | 68.54% | 99 | 5.16% |
| 1960 | 741 | 35.97% | 1,309 | 63.54% | 10 | 0.49% |
| 1964 | 1,898 | 77.60% | 0 | 0.00% | 548 | 22.40% |
| 1968 | 266 | 5.06% | 2,003 | 38.08% | 2,991 | 56.86% |
| 1972 | 2,859 | 59.22% | 1,779 | 36.85% | 190 | 3.94% |
| 1976 | 2,034 | 37.71% | 3,236 | 59.99% | 124 | 2.30% |
| 1980 | 2,074 | 34.69% | 3,583 | 59.93% | 322 | 5.39% |
| 1984 | 2,691 | 44.44% | 3,289 | 54.31% | 76 | 1.25% |
| 1988 | 2,414 | 42.71% | 3,187 | 56.39% | 51 | 0.90% |
| 1992 | 2,001 | 33.22% | 3,481 | 57.80% | 541 | 8.98% |
| 1996 | 1,893 | 34.59% | 3,372 | 61.61% | 208 | 3.80% |
| 2000 | 2,984 | 38.60% | 4,652 | 60.17% | 95 | 1.23% |
| 2004 | 3,281 | 41.30% | 4,631 | 58.29% | 33 | 0.42% |
| 2008 | 3,200 | 38.96% | 4,982 | 60.65% | 32 | 0.39% |
| 2012 | 3,210 | 37.12% | 5,411 | 62.58% | 26 | 0.30% |
| 2016 | 3,173 | 39.47% | 4,775 | 59.39% | 92 | 1.14% |
| 2020 | 3,192 | 40.41% | 4,663 | 59.03% | 45 | 0.57% |
| 2024 | 3,369 | 46.12% | 3,868 | 52.95% | 68 | 0.93% |

United States Senate election results for Hale County, Alabama2
| Year | Republican | | Democratic | | Third party(ies) | |
| Year | No. | % | No. | % | No. | % |
|---|---|---|---|---|---|---|
| 2020 | 3,090 | 39.21% | 4,786 | 60.74% | 4 | 0.05% |

United States Senate election results for Hale County, Alabama3
| Year | Republican | | Democratic | | Third party(ies) | |
| Year | No. | % | No. | % | No. | % |
|---|---|---|---|---|---|---|
| 2022 | 2,298 | 44.42% | 2,790 | 53.93% | 85 | 1.64% |

Alabama Gubernatorial election results for Hale County
| Year | Republican | | Democratic | | Third party(ies) | |
| Year | No. | % | No. | % | No. | % |
|---|---|---|---|---|---|---|
| 2022 | 2,288 | 43.95% | 2,818 | 54.13% | 100 | 1.92% |

== Transportation ==
=== Major highways ===
- U.S. Highway 80 / State Route 8 (unsigned)
- State Route 14
- State Route 25
- State Route 60
- State Route 61
- State Route 69

=== Airports ===
- Greensboro Municipal Airport (7A0) in Greensboro
- Moundville Airport (L44) in Moundville

== Tourism ==
Greensboro, the county seat, is home to the Safe House Black History Museum. On March 21, 1968, Martin Luther King Jr. attended a meeting at Greensboro's St. Matthew Church, and then spent the night in this house where he sought refuge from the Ku Klux Klan. The museum reveals the struggle for equality for African Americans in Alabama, and its founder, Theresa Burroughs, was both a family friend of King, and a foot soldier in the Civil Rights Movement. Historically William Burns Paterson had set up Tullibody Academy for African Americans in Greensboro.

Greensboro is also home to a large number of antebellum-era houses and churches, including some that are listed on the National Register of Historic Places such as Glencairn and Magnolia Grove.

== Education ==
All residents in the county are in the Hale County Schools.

== Communities ==
=== City ===
- Greensboro (county seat)

=== Towns ===
- Akron
- Moundville (partly in Tuscaloosa County)
- Newbern

=== Unincorporated communities ===
- Darrah
- Gallion
- Havana
- Lock Five
- Prairieville
- Sawyerville
- Stewart
- Wedgeworth

=== Ghost towns ===
- Arcola
- Erie
- Freetown

== Notable people ==
- William Christenberry (1936–2016), artist and photographer, born in Hale County

== See also ==
- National Register of Historic Places listings in Hale County, Alabama
- Properties on the Alabama Register of Landmarks and Heritage in Hale County, Alabama
- Hale County This Morning, This Evening—2018 documentary film about the black community in Hale County
