= PieLab =

Restaurant

Coordinates: 32.7038°N 87.5953°W

- Interactive map of PieLab

Restaurant information
- Established: 2009
- Location: 1317 Main St,, Greensboro, Alabama, 36744, United States

PieLab was a restaurant in Greensboro, Alabama, specializing in pie. The place was opened in an abandoned pool hall in 2009 by a group of designers from Belfast, Maine (calling themselves "Project M"). Led by a group of young graphic designers, it included a design studio and culinary school and aimed for social change in the community. Their "Empire Apple Pie" was written up by Southern Living for their series "The South's Best Pies", and Food & Wine likewise praised the apple pie, adding that the bakery's profits go toward housing and temporary shelters in Hale County, Alabama. They were one of three finalists for a 2010 James Beard Foundation Award. Food writer John T. Edge discussed PieLab at length in The New York Times, providing a history of Project M as well.

Pie Lab closed in 2020, citing the COVID-19 pandemic as a contributing factor to its closing.
