= Greensboro Airport =

Greensboro Airport may refer to:

- Piedmont Triad International Airport, an airport in Greensboro, North Carolina.
- Greensboro North Airport, an airport also located in Greensboro, North Carolina.
- Greensboro Municipal Airport, an airport in Greensboro, Alabama.
