= Wedgeworth, Alabama =

Unincorporated community in Alabama, United States

- Unincorporated community
- Location within Alabama Location within the United States
- Coordinates: 32°48′29″N 87°45′45″W
- Country: United States
- State: Alabama
- County: Hale
- Elevation: 141 ft (43 m)
- Time zone: UTC-6 (Central (CST))
  - Summer (DST): UTC-5 (CDT)
- Area code: 334
- GNIS feature ID: 155298

Wedgeworth, also known as Greenwood, is an unincorporated community in Hale County, Alabama, United States. Wedgeworth is located at the intersection of Alabama State Route 60 and Alabama State Route 14, 13.7 miles (22.0 km) northeast of Greensboro.

== History ==
Wedgworth is named for the family of John Wedgworth, an early settler of the area. A post office operated under the name Greenwood from 1895 to 1904, and under the name Wedgeworth from 1904 to 1955.
