= Alabama State Route 60 =

State highway in Alabama, United States

State Route 60

Route information
- Maintained by ALDOT
- Length: 11.310 mi (18.202 km)
- Existed: 1940–present

Major junctions
- West end: SR 14 at Wedgeworth
- East end: SR 69 at Havana

Location
- Country: United States
- State: Alabama
- Counties: Hale

Highway system
- Alabama State Highway System; Interstate; US; State
← SR 59	→ SR 61

State Route 60 (SR 60) is an 11.310-mile-long (18.202 km) state highway in Hale County in the west-central part of the U.S. state of Alabama. The western terminus of the highway is at an intersection with SR 14 at Wedgeworth. The eastern terminus of the highway is at an intersection with SR 69 at Havana.

== Route description ==
SR 60 travels through rural areas of Alabama's Black Belt. The highway heads to the northeast from its intersection with SR 14, not traveling through any incorporated communities. The highway is aligned along a two-lane road for its entire length.

== Major intersections ==
The entire route is in Hale County.

Location	mi	km	Destinations	Notes
Wedgeworth	0.000	0.000	SR 14 – Greensboro, Marion, Eutaw, Livingston	Western terminus
	11.310	18.202	SR 69	Eastern terminus
1.000 mi = 1.609 km; 1.000 km = 0.621 mi
