= Magnolia Grove (Greensboro, Alabama) =

Historic house in Alabama, United States

- U.S. National Register of Historic Places
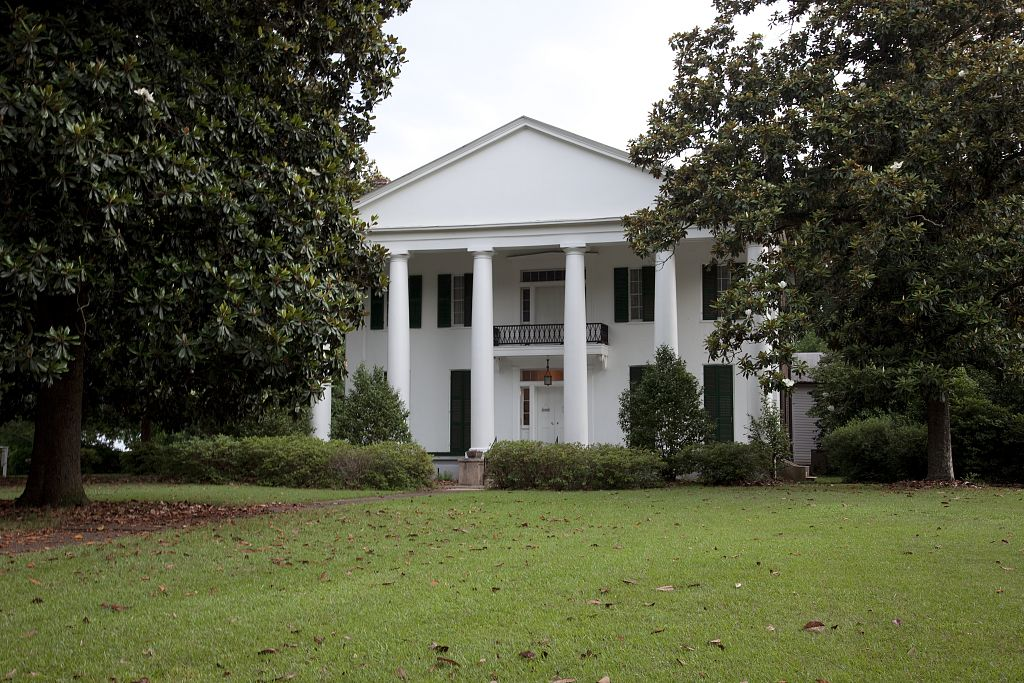
- Front elevation of Magnolia Grove in 2010, by Carol M. Highsmith

- Location within Alabama Location within the United States
- Location: W end of Main St., Greensboro, Alabama, United States
- Coordinates: 32°42′18″N 87°36′39″W
- Built: 1840
- Architectural style: Greek Revival
- NRHP reference No.: 73000345
- Added to NRHP: April 11, 1973

Magnolia Grove is a historic Greek Revival mansion in Greensboro, Alabama, United States. The house was named for the 15-acre (6.1 ha) grove of southern magnolias in which it stands. It was added to the National Register of Historic Places on April 11, 1973, due to its architectural and historical significance. It now serves as a historic house museum and is operated by the Alabama Historical Commission.

== History ==
Magnolia Grove was built in 1840 for Isaac Croom and his wife, Sarah Pearson Croom. Croom was a lawyer and planter from Lenoir County, North Carolina and one of the contributing founders of The University of the South at Sewanee. Sarah was the sister of Richmond Mumford Pearson, a prominent pro-Union politician and Chief Justice of the North Carolina Supreme Court.

Isaac Croom died in 1863, with Sarah following him in 1878. They left no living children, so the estate passed to Sarah C. Pearson, the daughter of Richmond Mumford Pearson. She married James M. Hobson, also of North Carolina, who eventually served as probate judge of Hale County for over twenty years. The Hobson family moved to Greensboro and raised four sons and three daughters at Magnolia Grove.

The Hobsons' most famous offspring was Richmond Pearson Hobson, a naval hero of the Spanish–American War. He was awarded the Medal of Honor in 1933 for his actions aboard the USS Merrimac and in 1934, by special act of the United States Congress, he was advanced to Naval Constructor with a rank of Rear Admiral. Hobson resigned from active naval duty in 1903 to begin a career as a Democratic U.S. Representative from Alabama. He served from March 4, 1907, until March 3, 1915, and during that time proposed more than 20 constitutional amendments to ban alcohol. He was denied the Democratic nomination in 1916 to the 65th Congress. He then organized the American Alcohol Education Association in 1921, organized the International Narcotic Education Association in 1923, organized the World Conference on Narcotic Education in 1926, and founded the World Narcotic Defense Association in 1927. These activities have caused some to label him the "Father of American Prohibition".

On January 22, 1942, the Gleaves-class destroyer USS Hobson, was commissioned in his honor posthumously. Magnolia Grove was dedicated as a state shrine in his honor on May 1, 1947.

== Architecture ==
Magnolia Grove is a relatively rare Alabama example of a full-scale pedimented temple-form house in the Greek Revival style. It is a two-story masonry structure, built in handmade brick. The front facade is stuccoed, including the pediment. The sides and rear are left with the brick face exposed.

The front facade features a monumental hexastyle portico with Doric columns. These support a plain entablature with a simple molding dividing the architrave and frieze. Above a simple cornice, the unadorned pediment is framed by horizontal and raking geisons. Behind the portico, the building is divided into a five bay facade. The central bay is occupied by doorways on both floors, with simply molded windows occupying the remaining bays to either side. Both door surrounds are Greek Revival, these are inset with double doors, surrounded by sidelights and topped by a transom. The upper doorway opens onto a cantilevered balcony. The lower windows are floor-to-ceiling and open onto the portico, while the upper windows are six-over-six. The rear of the building also has a two-story portico, but here it is supported by six slender cast-iron columns.

The interior features plaster cornice moldings and Greek Revival door and window surrounds. Both floors are evenly divided by a central hall running from front to back. The first floor contains a parlor, living room, dining room, and study. A separate two-story brick building to the rear of the main house contained the original kitchen and servant's quarters. A cantilevered staircase with mahogany treads and railing climbs from the rear of the hall to the second floor. This level contains a central hall and four bedrooms.

== Gallery ==
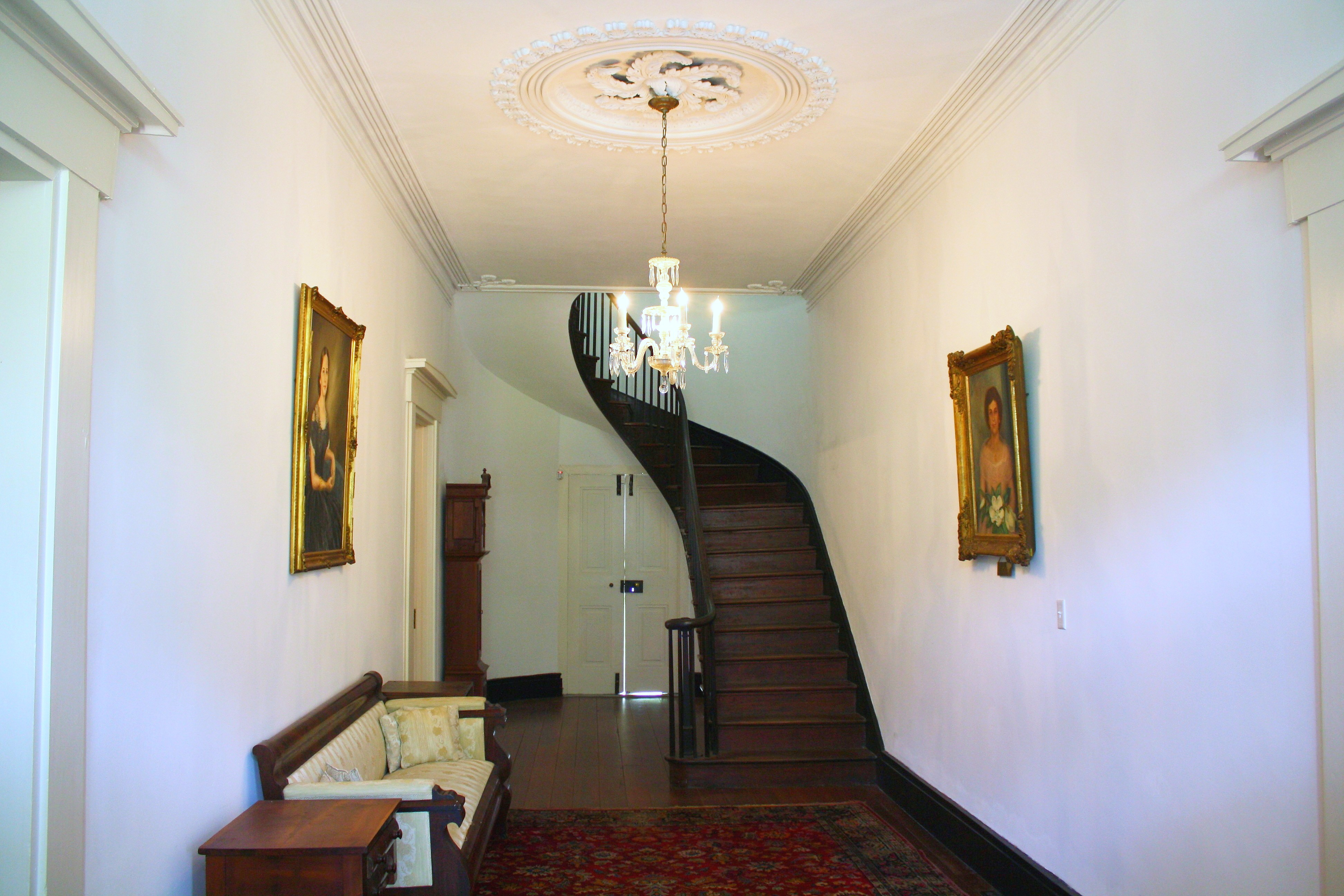
Entrance hall

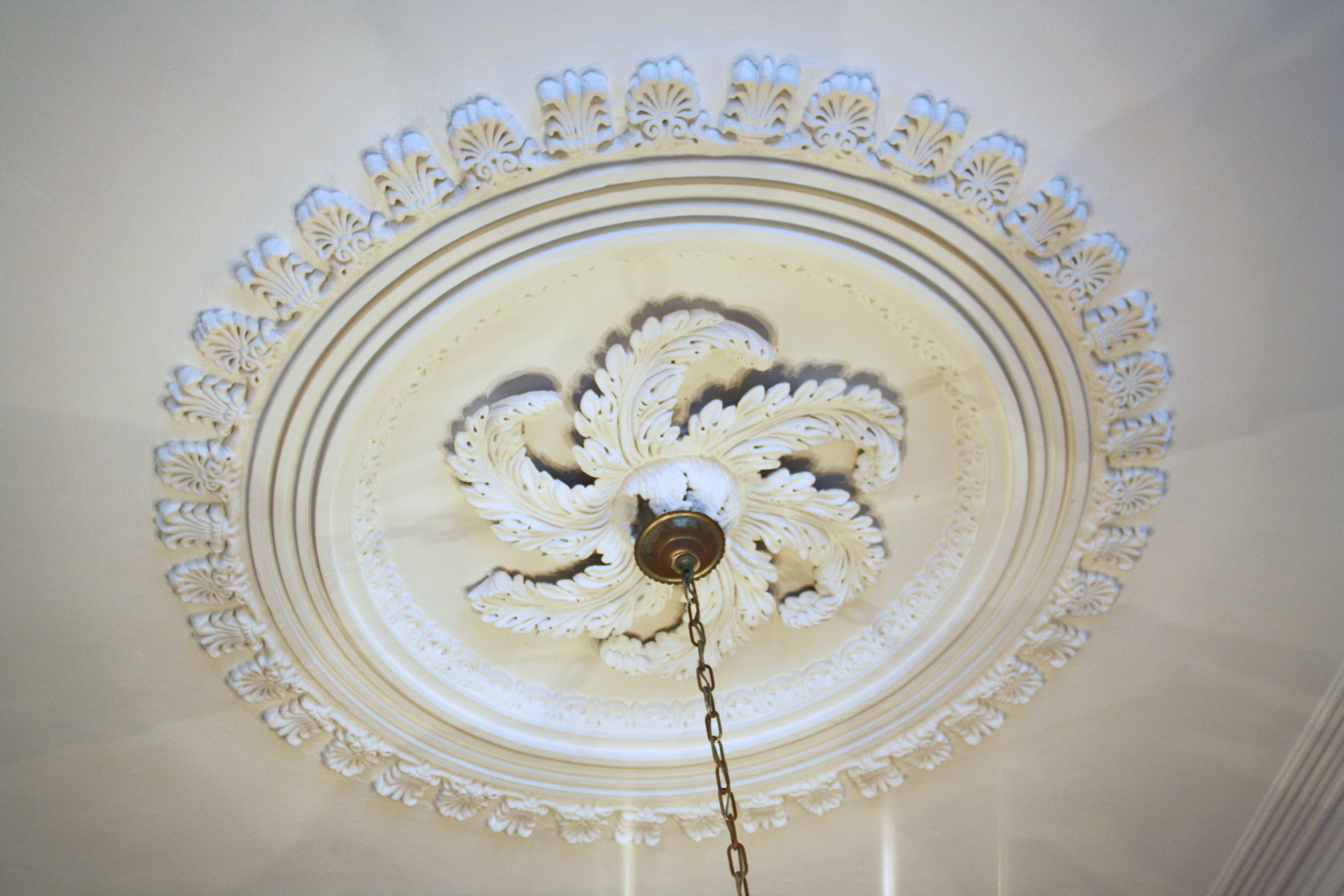
Plasterwork ceiling medallion in entrance hall

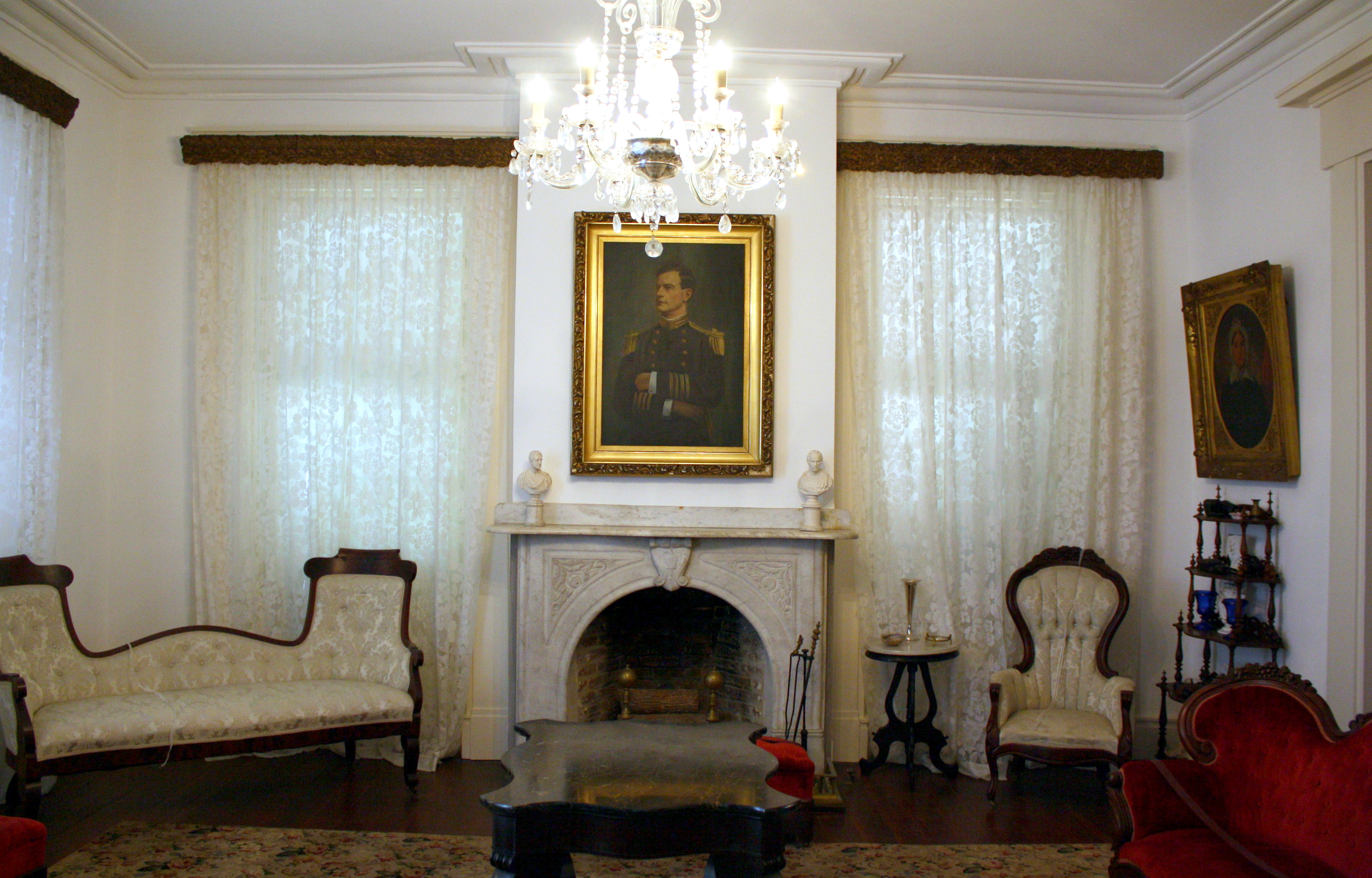
Parlor

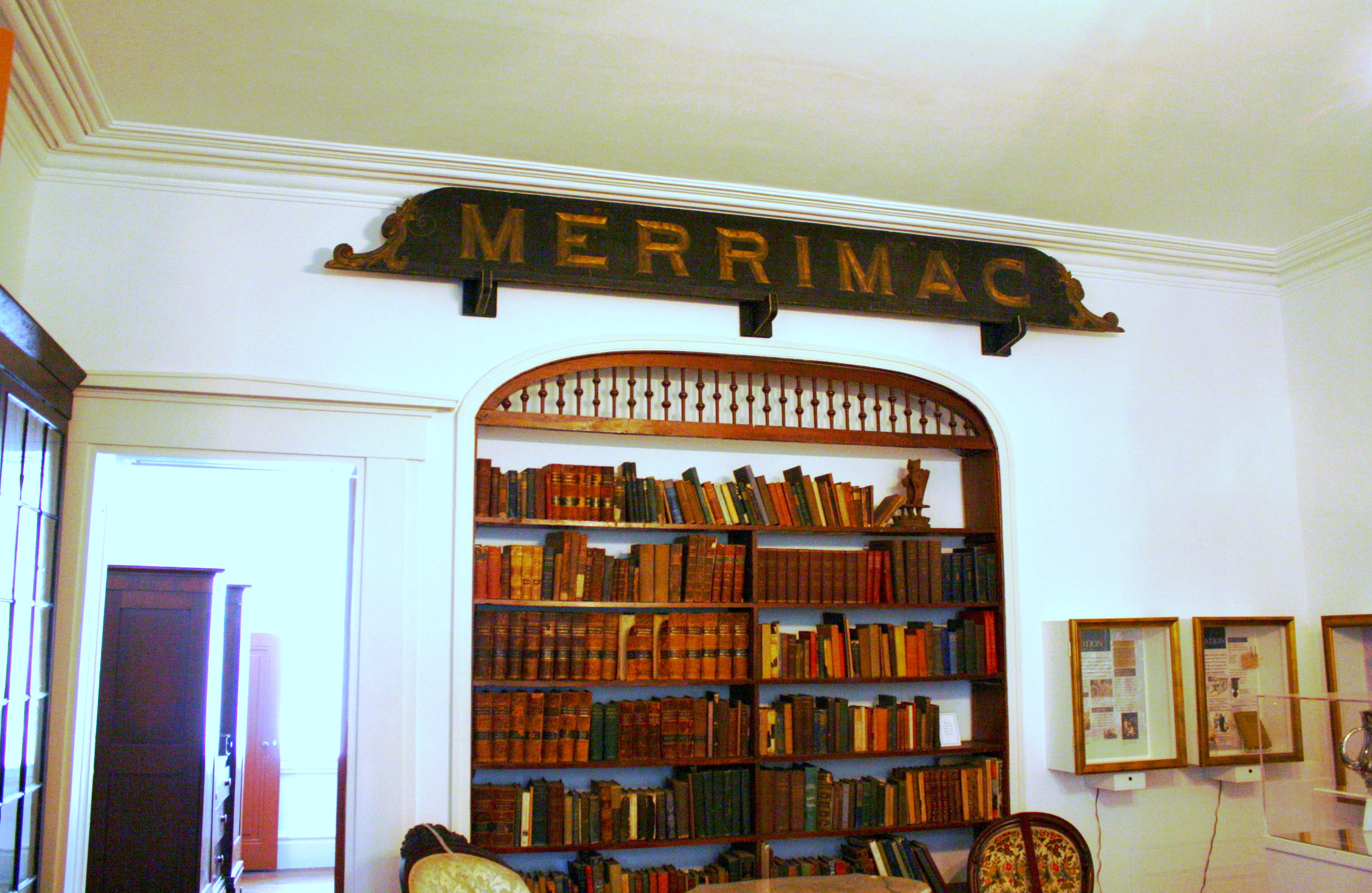
Library with name placard from the USS Merrimac, the ship scuttled as a harbor blockship by Hobson

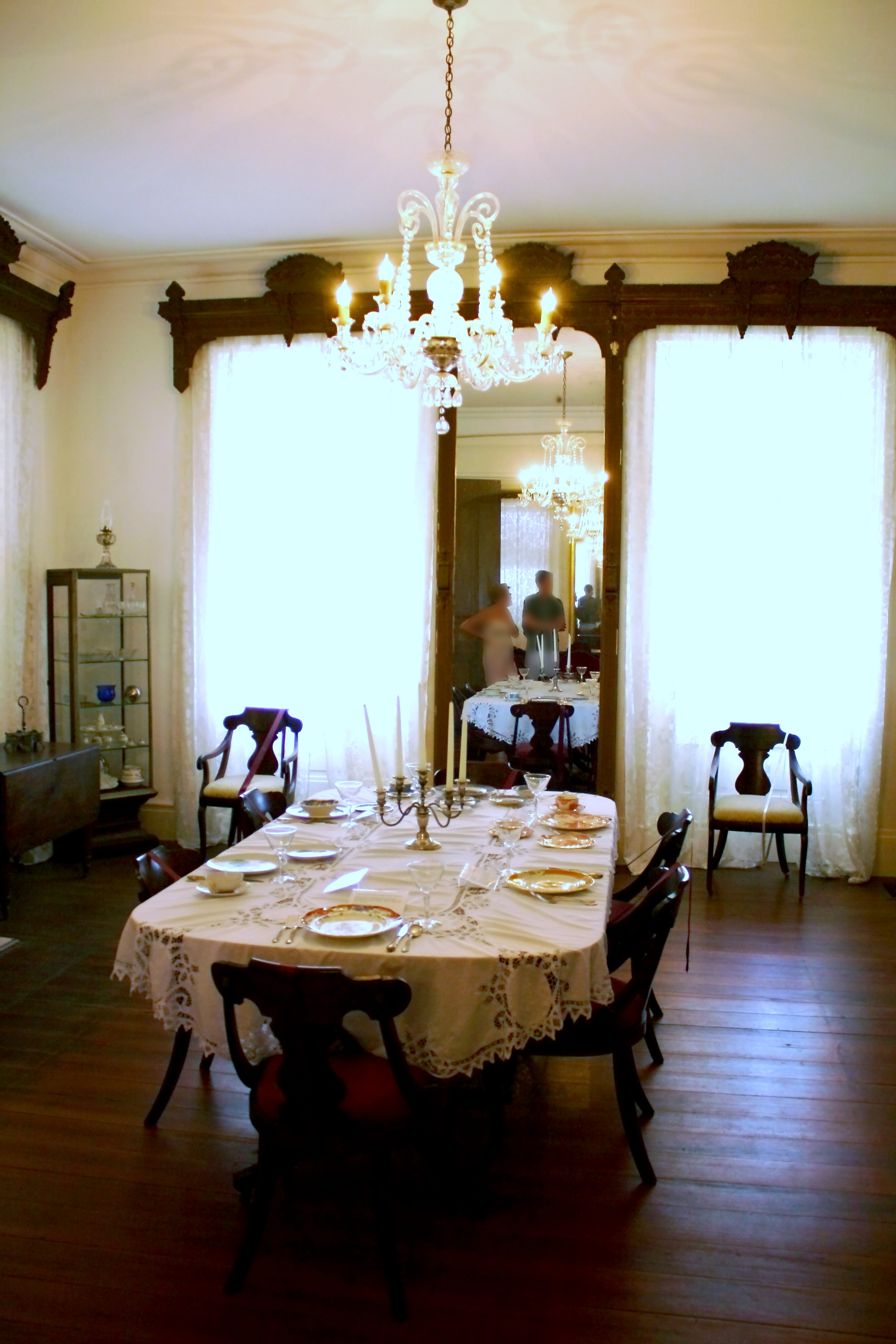
Dining room

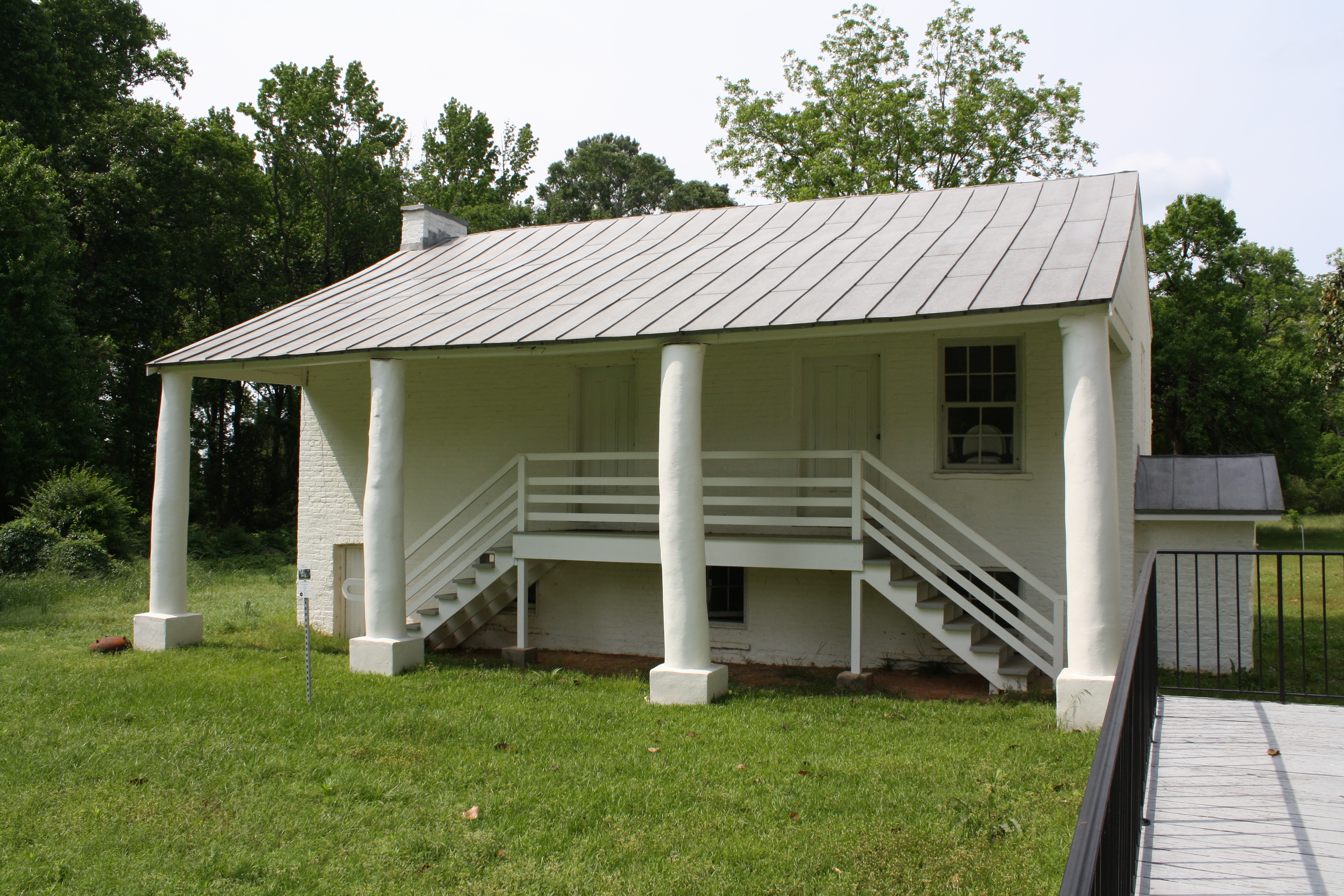
Detached kitchen and cook's house

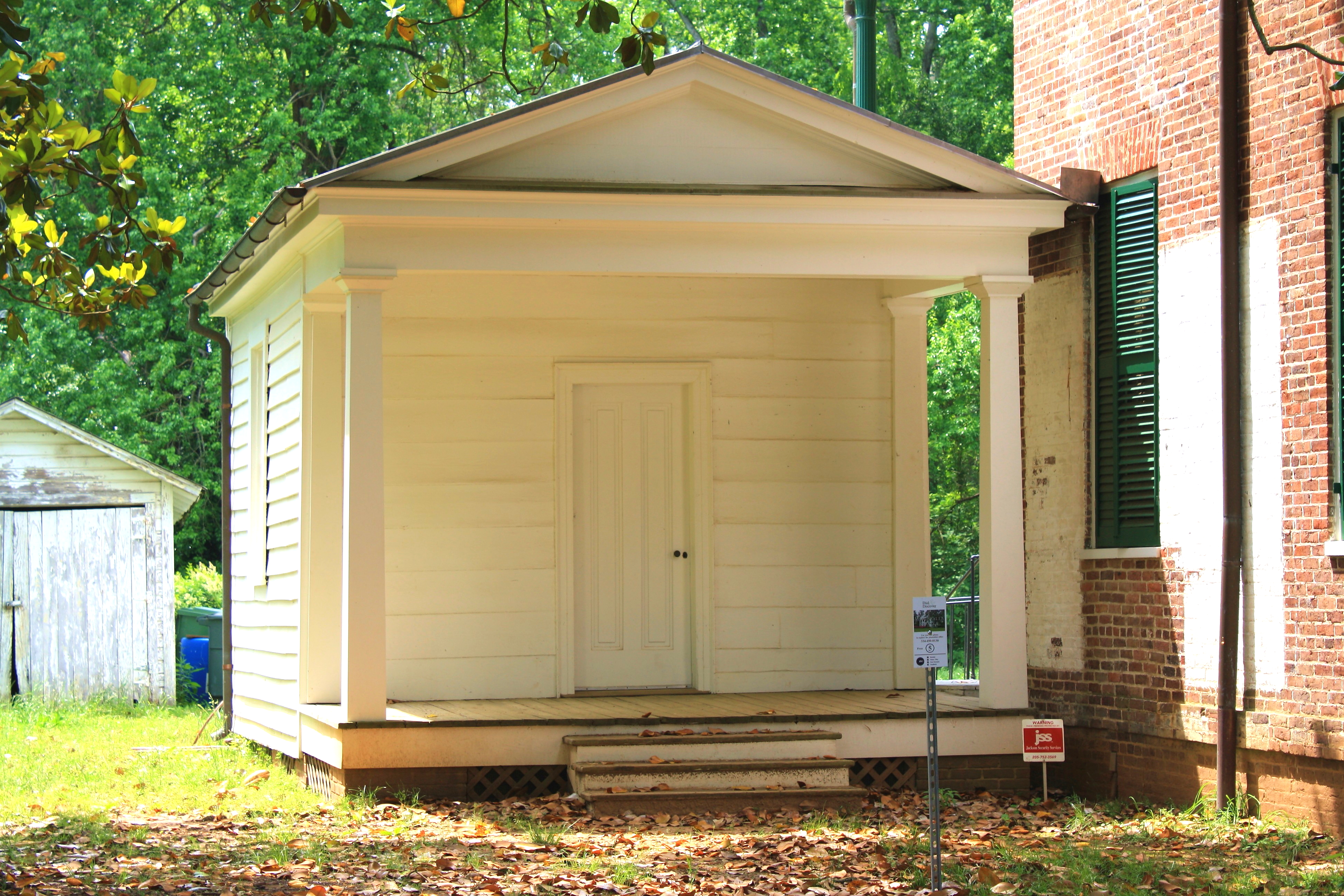
Detached office

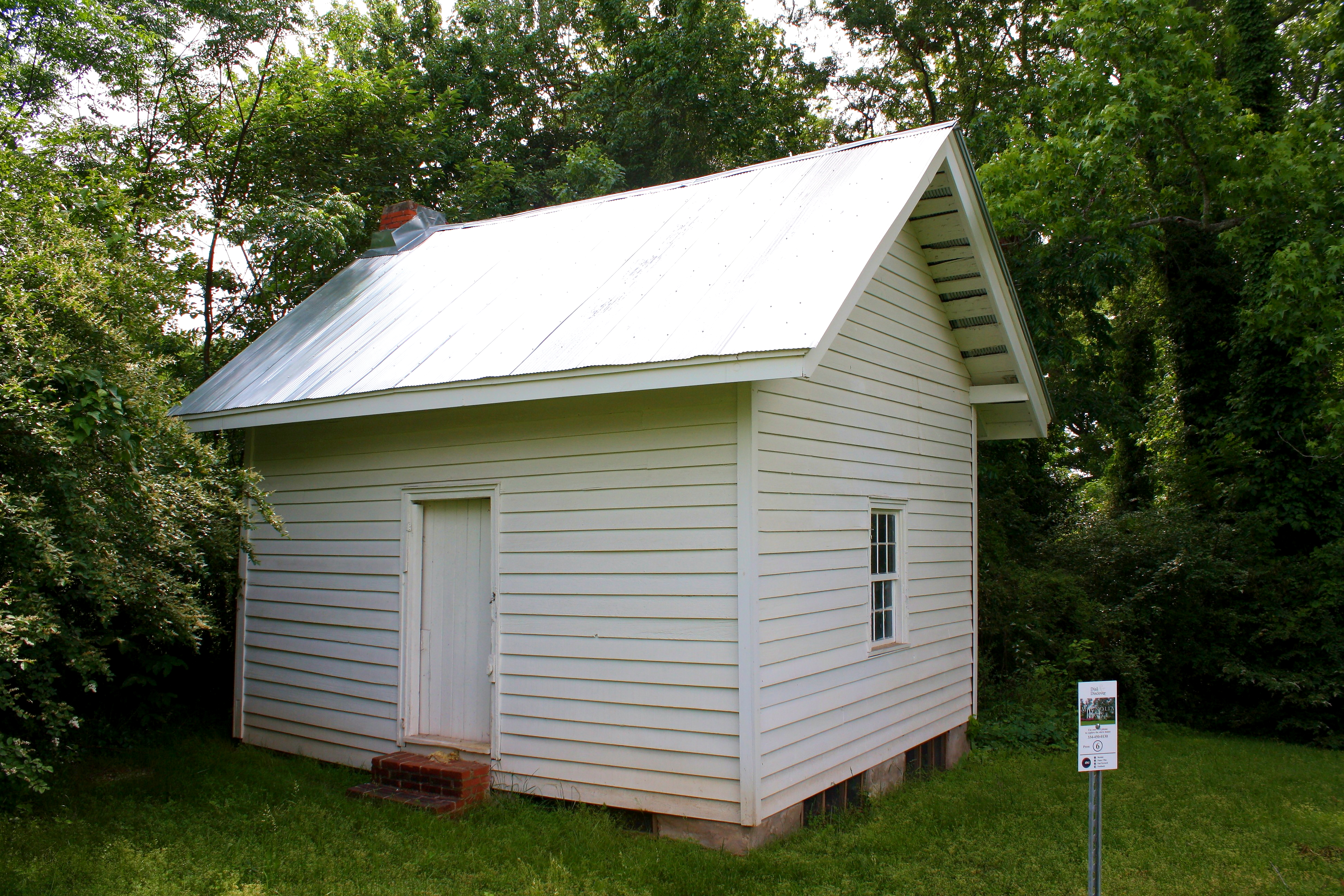
Slave house

== See also ==
- Magnolia Hall (Greensboro, Alabama)
- National Register of Historic Places listings in Hale County, Alabama
