= Tullibody Academy =

Coordinates: 32.3666°N 86.2960°W

Tullibody Academy was a school for African Americans in Hale County, central western Alabama. It was established by William Burns Paterson in the early part of 1870.

== History ==
Paterson began his school on or near the McFadden plantation in a brush arbor. He then moved his school into a log house named Hopewell about four miles from Greensboro. In 1871 Paterson moved his school to Greensboro, a town of less than 2000 people. He began in Greensboro with only five or six students "under the oaks, with logs for benches." He then utilized his talents as a builder in constructing his own schoolhouse, "a frame structure 65 x 45." Paterson named his school, Tullibody Academy, in honor of his home town, Tullibody in Scotland. He remained at this school until 1878 when he became the principal of the Negro school in Marion.

Several of Greensboro's whites protested when Paterson began the town's first school for African Americans. They opposed "Negro education", especially if it would cost the whites anything." 'Let the Negroes educate themselves,' they said." Paterson had "a long and hard struggle" getting money to support' the school. His friends, the McFaddens, and other "plantation owners and leading citizens" did all they could to help him with his school. With this support and much hard work, Paterson gradually "won the respect and admiration and aid of the best people of that portion of the South." Thus, a few of Greensboro's more affluent whites supported the school, but other whites in the community were indifferent or hostile to "Negro education".

While Paterson was President of Tullibody Academy, he devoted most of his time and energy to the school. Paterson believed that no one in Alabama worked harder at his business than he did.

By September, 1873, Paterson (probably aided by one or more assistants) was planning to offer reading, writing, arithmetic, geometry, music, drawing, Latin, Greek, German, French, Spanish, Hebrew, chemistry, and philosophy.

== Reputation ==
In 1877, a local paper, The Alabama Beacon, judged the Tullibody Academy "among the better Negro schools." At that time it was "a well organized school with a faculty of four teachers and the principal."

On July 26, 1878, Paterson left Tullibody Academy to accept the Presidency of the State Normal School and University for Colored Students and Teachers in Marion, Alabama. Like medieval scholars John William Beverly (Paterson's best student, later fellow teacher, finally his successor) and perhaps other Tullibody students followed Paterson to Marion and continued their studies with him there.

Tullibody operated until at least 1886 since Beverly served as the school's principal from 1882 until 1886. Evidently Tullibody closed or merged with the public schools when Beverly left in 1886.

Mr. A. Wimbs was a student at the school.
