= William Christenberry =

American photographer

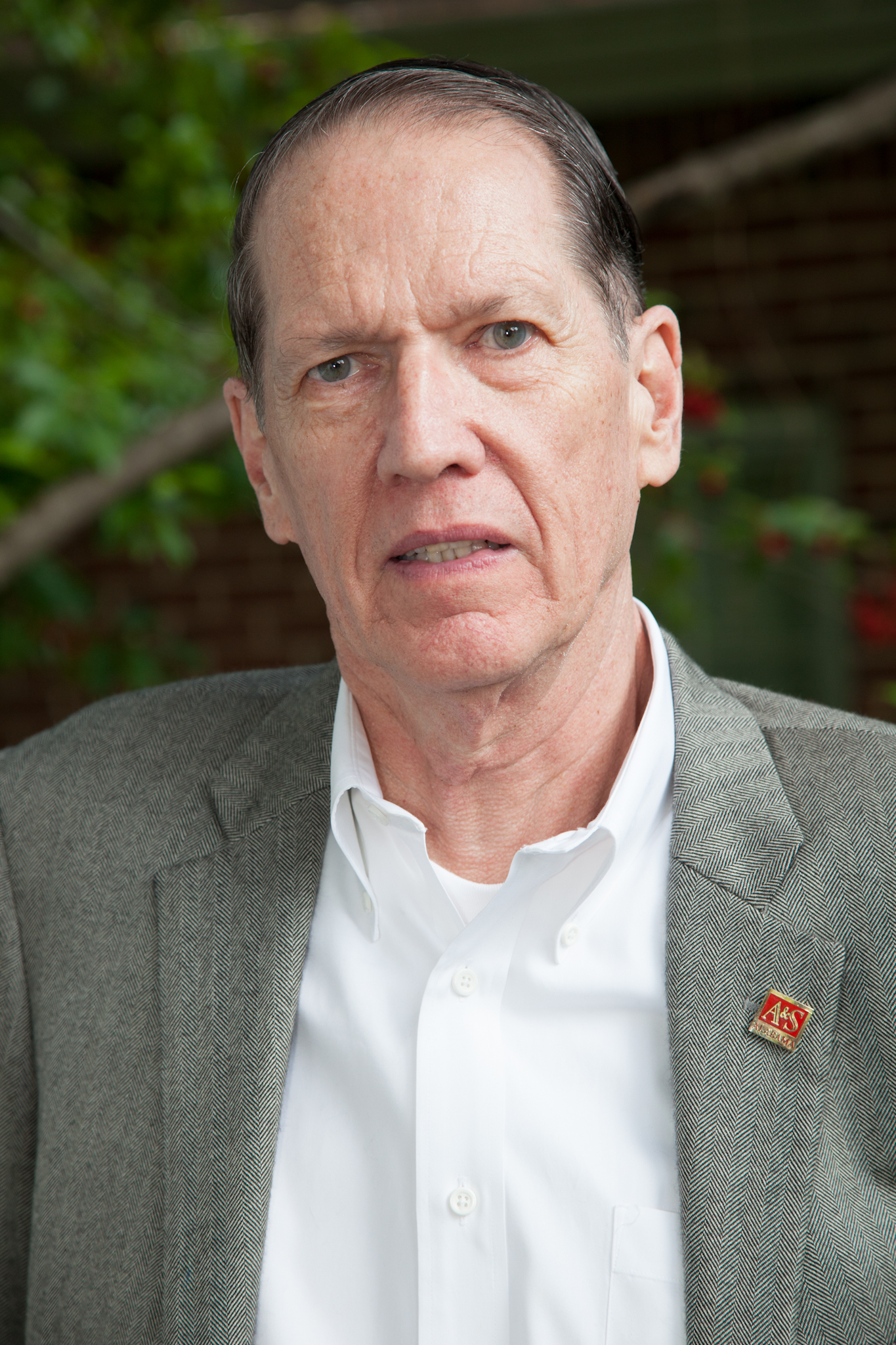
- Christenberry in 2012
- Born: William Andrew Christenberry Jr. November 5, 1936; Tuscaloosa, Alabama, U.S.
- Died: November 28, 2016 (aged 80); Washington, D.C.
- Known for: Photographer, Painter, sculptor

William Andrew Christenberry Jr. (November 5, 1936 – November 28, 2016) was an American photographer, painter, sculptor, and teacher who drew inspiration from his childhood in Hale County, Alabama. Christenberry focused on architecture, abandoned structures, nature, and studied the psychology and effects of place and memory. He is best known for his haunting compositions of landscapes, signs, and abandoned buildings in his home state. Christenberry is also considered a pioneer of color photography as an art form; he was especially encouraged in the medium by the likes of Walker Evans and William Eggleston.

== Early life ==
William Andrew Christenberry Jr. was born on November 5, 1936, in Tuscaloosa, Alabama, the oldest of three children. His father tried to attend college but found it too expensive and spent his life working as a delivery man for a bakery and a salesman of dairy and insurance. His mother, Ruby Willard Smith, was a tax assessor and homemaker; she also created textiles which went on to become family heirlooms. Christenberry's grandparents on both sides operated farms in Hale County, which was where his childhood summers were spent. In 1944, Christenberry and his sister received a Brownie camera as a joint Christmas gift, a gift which would remain important throughout his career. He studied painting and sculpture at the University of Alabama in Tuscaloosa and earned his B.F.A. in 1958 and an M.F.A. in 1959. Christenberry was originally influenced by Abstract expressionism and his studies under Melville Price, but later found himself more attracted to the type of realism attributed to Jasper Johns and Robert Rauschenberg.

His artistic career began with painting – specifically large, abstract-expressionist canvasses, but his focus and inspiration shifted to the place and memories of his childhood. After receiving his degrees Christenberry stayed at the University of Alabama for a few years as a teacher and in 1961 he encountered James Agee and Walker Evans' book, "Let Us Now Praise Famous Men", which brought inspiration to the work Christenberry was already completing – namely his direct-address photographs of Hale County which he had started taking in 1958 with his Brownie camera (from 1944). During his time at the University of Alabama, Christenberry's teacher Melville Price, encouraged him to leave Alabama, at least for a time, to find a wider vision of the world. Thus, in 1961, he moved to New York.

== Career ==
Christenberry only stayed in New York for fourteen months before he took a job teaching in Memphis. During his time in New York City, Christenberry produced very little art, but upon his move to Memphis his creativity took off. In his early years in Memphis, Christenberry painted large, two yards, by four yards paintings, "Fruit Stand" (1963), "Beale Street" (1964), and "Klavern 93" (1964). Then, in 1965 he met Sandy Deane, who would go on to be his wife in 1967; early in their relationship they became and remained close friends with William Eggleston and his wife. In 1968, the Christenberrys moved to Washington, D.C., so William could take a teaching position at the Corcoran College of Art and Design.

Shortly after beginning a professorship at Corcoran College, Christenberry began making annual visits to Hale County during the summer to visit family, explore and take photographs. Originally these all were made with the Kodak Brownie camera given to him as a child, while he would later move on to a large format view camera to capture more detail, he continued to use the Brownie throughout his career. On one occasion in 1973, Walker Evans, who had encouraged Christenberry to take his photographs seriously, accompanied him. This was Evans's first and only return to Hale County since 1936.

Akron Wall (1987) at The Phillips Collection in 2022

One of the results of this pilgrimage was a series of photographs documenting the decay of individual structures, which are photographed as nearly isolated objects. In 1974, Christenberry began translating some of these photographed buildings into detailed sculptures that accurately reproduce their state of decay and patina. Although detailed and properly proportioned, Christenberry did not refer to these creations as models, as he says they are not based on precise measurements, and he preferred that they be called sculptures. The bases for these sculptures often are set in soil taken from these places. On many of these trips, Christenberry collected old advertising signs and other found objects which inspired him. Some of these are incorporated into his work, while others hung in his studio.

Another series of works was provoked by an incident when, out of curiosity, he tried to attend a meeting of the Ku Klux Klan. Confronted at the door by a glaring masked figure, Christenberry fled. Although he destroyed his first two Klan paintings, the subject occupied him for many years, resulting in a dense multi-medium construction adjacent to his studio that came to be known as the "Klan Room," which was burgled mysteriously in 1979. Christenberry largely reconstructed the room, which is filled with paintings, found objects, drawings, sculptures, dioramas, and a series of fabric dolls of Klansmen in their hooded robes.

Christenberry was diagnosed with Alzheimer's disease in 2011. Christenberry died in Washington, D.C., on November 28, 2016, from complications of the disease. He was 80.

Though known more as a photographer and multi-medium artist than as a painter, Christenberry taught painting. His work has been exhibited in solo and group shows around the world and is the subject of several monographs.

== Collections ==
Christenberry's work is held in the following permanent collections:

- Museum of Modern Art, New York
- Whitney Museum of American Art, New York
- Smithsonian American Art Museum, Washington D.C.
- J. Paul Getty Museum, Los Angeles, CA
