= Lock Five, Alabama =

Unincorporated community in Alabama, US

- Unincorporated community
- Location within Alabama Location within the United States
- Coordinates: 32°34′59″N 87°44′12″W
- Country: United States
- State: Alabama
- County: Hale
- Elevation: 92 ft (28 m)
- Time zone: UTC-6 (Central (CST))
  - Summer (DST): UTC-5 (CDT)
- Area code: 334
- GNIS feature ID: 121938

Lock Five is an unincorporated community in Hale County, Alabama. The Lock 5 Park and Recreation Area, which is maintained by the United States Army Corps of Engineers, is listed as one of the stops on the Alabama Birding Trails.
