= Bob Wiggins =

- Outfielder
- Born: September 28, 1933; Greensboro, Alabama
- Died: November 16, 2012 (aged 79); Hines, Illinois

Negro American League debut
- 1959, for the Raleigh Tigers

Last appearance
- 1960, for the ?

Teams
- Raleigh Tigers (1959–?); Kansas City Monarchs (?)

Robert Wiggins (September 28, 1933 – November 16, 2012) was an outfielder who played in the Negro American League in 1959 and 1960 for the Raleigh Tigers and Kansas City Monarchs.

He was drafted into the Army in 1953. In the mid-to-late 1950s, he played semi-professional baseball for the Chicago Brown Bombers, Chicago Giants and Mobile Black Barons, earning a tryout with the Chicago White Sox in 1958, though they did not sign him. He later received an invitation from the Chicago Cubs, who also did not give him a contract.

He died at the age of 79 on November 16, 2012.
