= Greensboro Municipal Airport =

Airport in Alabama, United States

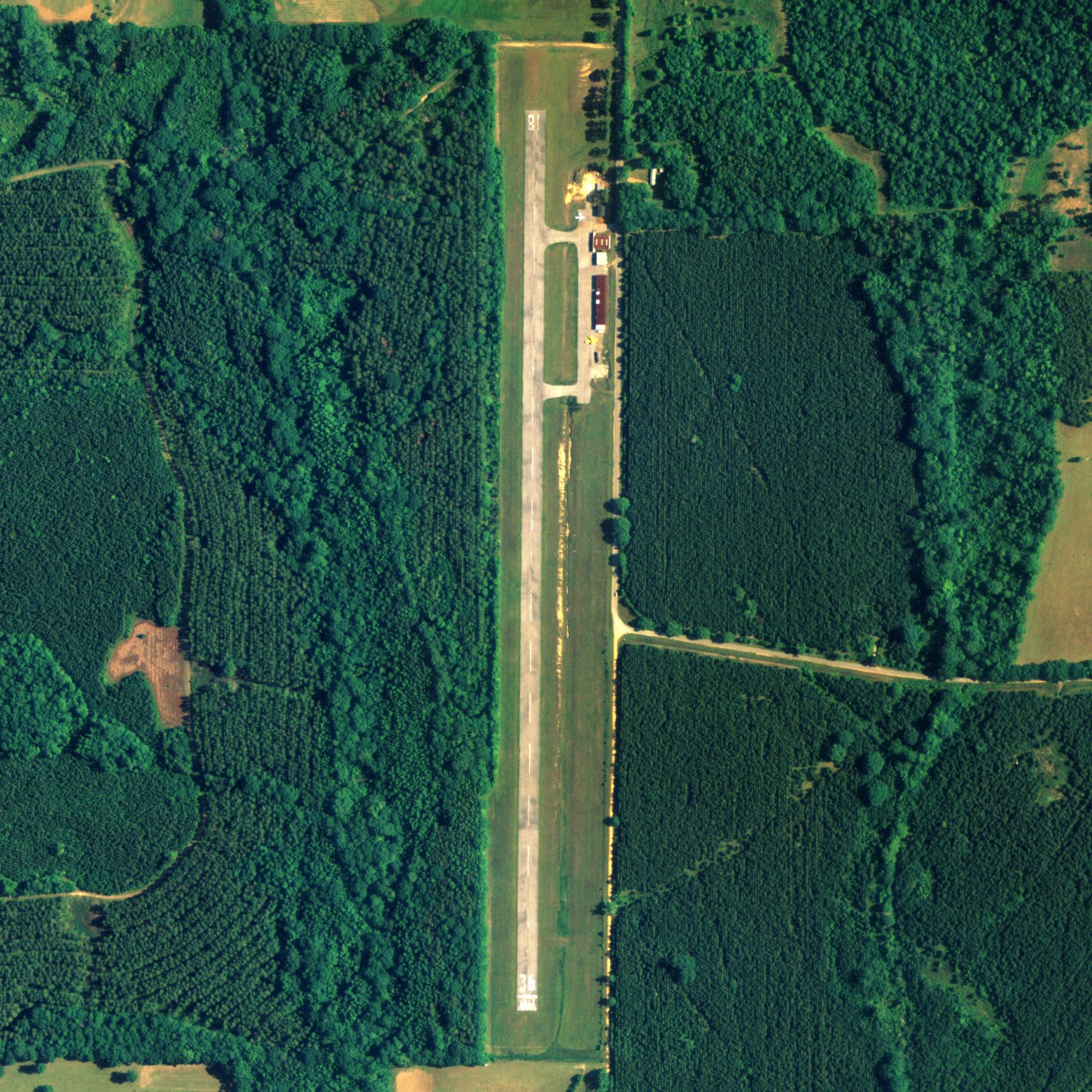
- NAIP aerial image, 30 June 2006
- IATA: none; ICAO: none; FAA LID: 7A0

Summary
- Airport type: Public
- Owner: City of Greensboro
- Serves: Greensboro, Alabama
- Elevation AMSL: 180 ft (55 m)
- Coordinates: 32°40′53″N 087°39′44″W
- Interactive map of Greensboro Municipal Airport

Runways
Direction	Length		Surface
Direction	ft	m	Surface
18/36	3,495	1,065	Asphalt

Statistics (2007)
- Aircraft operations: 2,088
- Based aircraft: 9
- Source: Federal Aviation Administration

Greensboro Municipal Airport (FAA LID: 7A0) is a city-owned public-use airport located three nautical miles (4 mi, 6 km) southwest of the central business district of Greensboro, a city in Hale County, Alabama, United States.

This airport is included in the FAA's National Plan of Integrated Airport Systems for 2011–2015 and 2009–2013, both of which categorized it as a general aviation facility.

== Facilities and aircraft ==
Greensboro Municipal Airport covers an area of 23 acres (9 ha) at an elevation of 180 feet (55 m) above mean sea level. It has one runway designated 18/36 with an asphalt surface measuring 3,495 by 78 feet (1,065 x 24 m).

For the 12-month period ending November 7, 2007, the airport had 2,088 general aviation aircraft operations, an average of 174 per month. At that time there were 9 aircraft based at this airport: 67% single-engine and 33% multi-engine.

== See also ==
- List of airports in Alabama
