= Millwood (Greensboro, Alabama) =

Historic house in Alabama, United States

- U.S. National Register of Historic Places
- U.S. Historic district
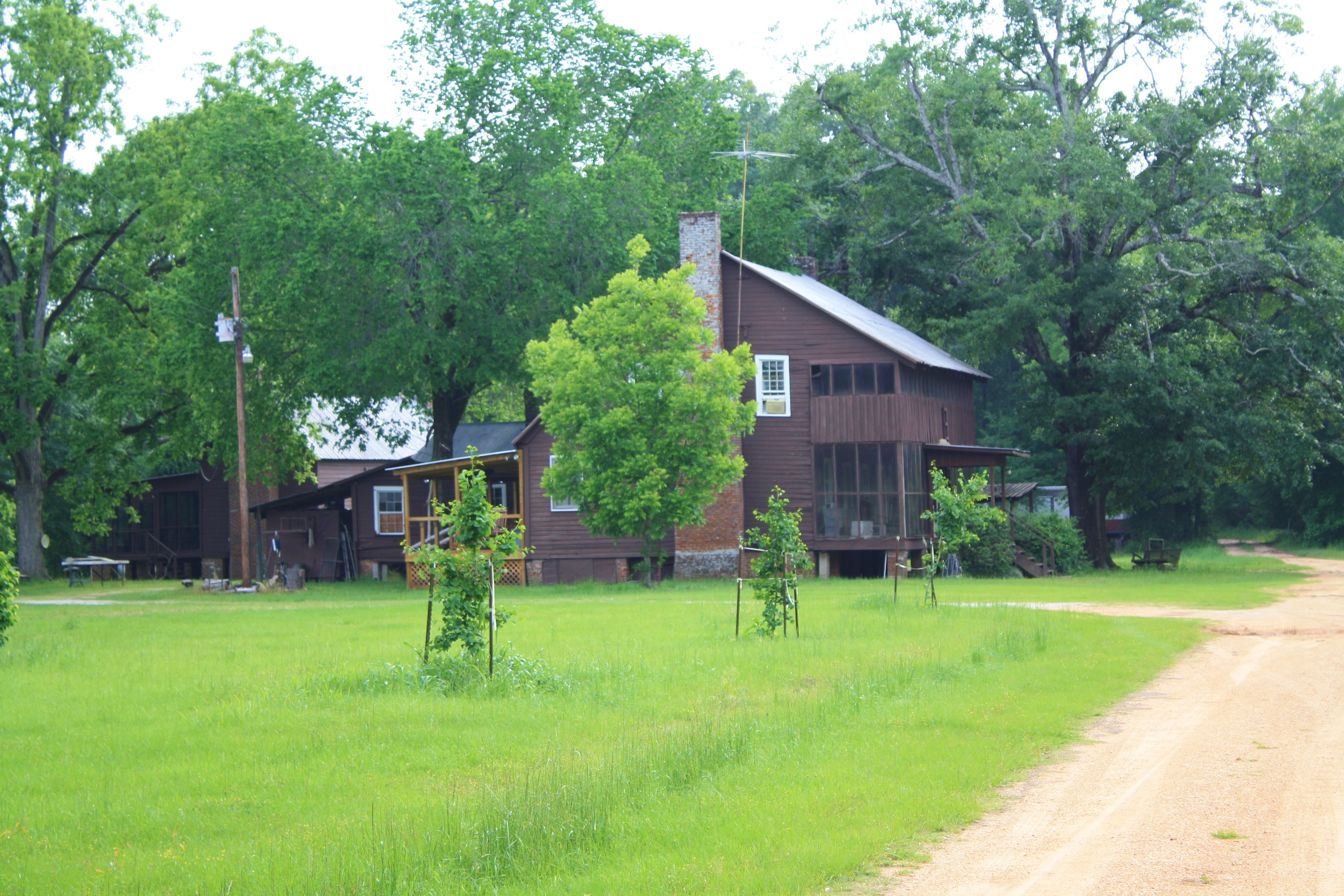
- Main house at Millwood in 2011

- Location within Alabama Location within the United States
- Nearest city: Greensboro, Alabama
- Coordinates: 32°39′34″N 87°44′59″W
- Built: 1830
- NRHP reference No.: 89000314
- Added to NRHP: September 26, 1989

Millwood is a historic plantation house and historic district on the east bank of the Black Warrior River, southwest of Greensboro, Alabama, US. The house was built in 1830. It also served as a river hotel in the mid to late 19th century. The property was added to the National Register of Historic Places on September 26, 1989, due to its architectural and historical significance.
