= Darrah, Alabama =

Unincorporated community in Alabama, United States

- Unincorporated community
- Location within Alabama Location within the United States
- Coordinates: 32°51′20″N 87°47′18″W
- Country: United States
- State: Alabama
- County: Hale
- Elevation: 112 ft (34 m)
- Time zone: UTC-6 (Central (CST))
  - Summer (DST): UTC-5 (CDT)
- Area code: 334
- GNIS feature ID: 156252

Darrah is an unincorporated community in Hale County, Alabama, United States.
