= Greensboro North Airport =

- IATA: none; ICAO: 36NC; FAA LID: 36NC

Summary
- Airport type: Private
- Owner: Hawks Landing Property (Orlando, Florida)
- Serves: Greensboro, North Carolina
- Elevation AMSL: 900 ft (270 m)
- Coordinates: 36°15′22″N 79°54′48″W
- Interactive map of Greensboro North Airport

Runways
Direction	Length		Surface
Direction	ft	m	Surface
5/23	3,200	975	Asphalt-Turf

Statistics (2011)
- Based aircraft: 1
- Source: Federal Aviation Administration

Greensboro North Airport (ICAO: 36NC, FAA LID: 36NC) is a private airport located 10 miles north of Greensboro, North Carolina.

Permission is required prior to landing.
