= William Burns Paterson =

Educator and horticulturist

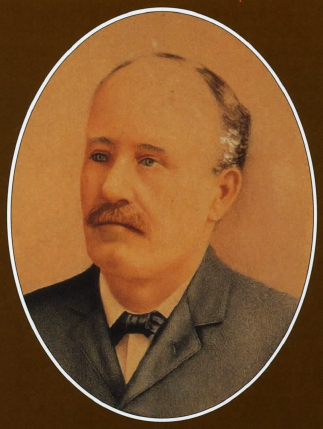

President of Alabama State University
- In office 1878–1915
- Preceded by: George N. Card
- Succeeded by: John William Beverly

Personal details
- Born: February 9, 1850 Tullibody, Clackmannanshire, Scotland
- Died: March 16, 1915 Montgomery
- Spouse: Margaret Bingham

William Burns Paterson was an educator and horticulturist. He is chiefly known as an educational provider, being involved in establishing Alabama State University. He was a Democrat, a Presbyterian, and a charter member of the Alabama State horticultural society.

== Early life ==
William was born in 1850 (some sources 1849), at Tullibody, Clackmannanshire, Scotland, son of John and Janet (Burns) Paterson, of Tullibody. His father was a Balman (sometimes called a "ball man" or "pot still man") to trade at Glenochil Distillery. He is also recorded as having worked as a gardener at Tullibody House. He died when William was still young. He was a lineal descendant of John, brother the poet Robert Burns. He had three years in the elementary schools of Scotland. In youth he was employed on the estate of Lord Abercrombie, located near Tullibody, and here he acquired that great love for flowers which played so important a part in his life. He was impressed by David Livingstone and considered working in Africa himself. Tickets out of Scotland were expensive; he made it to America, in 1867, by working on the voyage as a deck-hand on a freight ship bound for New York. Around 1869 he came to America, landing in New York; and after various experiences through the north and middle west, he drifted south to do construction work on a railroad being built out of Selma. He often walked long distances to find work. He was variously employed: as a driver on the Erie Canal, in the Washington Navy Yard, on an Alabama railroad and on the Black Warrior River working as a dredger.

== Educational provider ==
In early 1870 he opened a school for negroes near the McFadden plantation in the vicinity of Greensboro. From 1871 to 1879 he conducted Tullibody Academy for negroes at Greensboro, named after his home village. In the latter year he moved to Marion, where he became president of the Lincoln Normal University for Colored Students. Here he remained several years, at the same time agitating in favour of State support. He finally succeeded in 1889, in securing an appropriation and also legislative authorization for relocation. Montgomery was selected, despite opposition from several including Booker T. Washington, and Mr. Paterson opened the school in the Beulah Baptist church under the name of State Normal School for Colored Students. He successfully presided over this institution as long as he lived. He overcame opposition to his plans, and vindicated his position in favour of public support.

== Horticulture ==
In 1890 he opened up a floral establishment, known as Rosemont Gardens, which grew from a 16 x 50 foot greenhouse to an area of about five acres.

== Personal life ==
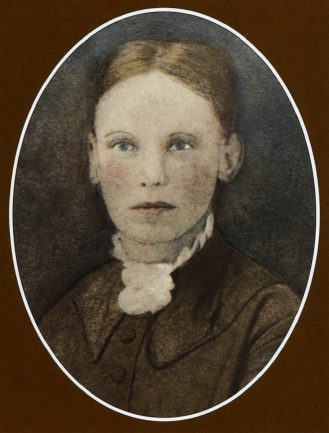
Maggie Flack Paterson

Married: June 5, 1879, at Selma, to Margaret Bingham, daughter of Newton R. and Annie (Bingham) Flack. Mrs. Paterson, a teacher, was a graduate of Oberlin college and a native of Canfield, Ohio, she was of Irish descent.

Children:

- 1. Annie Janet, m. Rupert D. Wilson;
- 2. William Burns, Junior m. Carrie Burton McDade. He was a sportsman and business leader. Paterson Field is a baseball stadium opened in 1949 Montgomery, Alabama and is named after him;
- 3. James Porter, m. Ha Watson;
- 4. John Haygood, m. Lucy Benton Young. He was two-time state commissioner for agriculture;
- 5. Wallace Bruce, m. Alice Ckty.

He died of heart failure at 10 a.m. 16 March 1915, at Montgomery. Paterson had no regrets about his career. He wished his epitaph to be, " 'He taught Negroes fifty years.' " Paterson was only five years away from this goal when he died.

== Legacy ==
Alabama State University Founder's Day is celebrated on William Burns Paterson's birthday on 9 February. It has been remembered every year since 1901. The Bluebells of Scotland which was Paterson's favourite song was regularly sung. The university has a "Spirit of Tullibody Award" to honour the brave and forward-thinking spirit of Paterson by making civil contributions. Paterson was honoured by George Reid in the Scottish Parliament on 11 September 2002 emphasising his dealings with the Ku Klux Klan. One of Paterson's favourite poems was "What I Live For" by George Linnaeus Banks. Some of his correspondence with Booker T. Washington has been published. Photographs of him still exist; one is found in a book by Charles William Dabney. Paterson himself compiled a list of around 1000 of the graduates and their occupations. Paterson Elementary School closed in 2009.

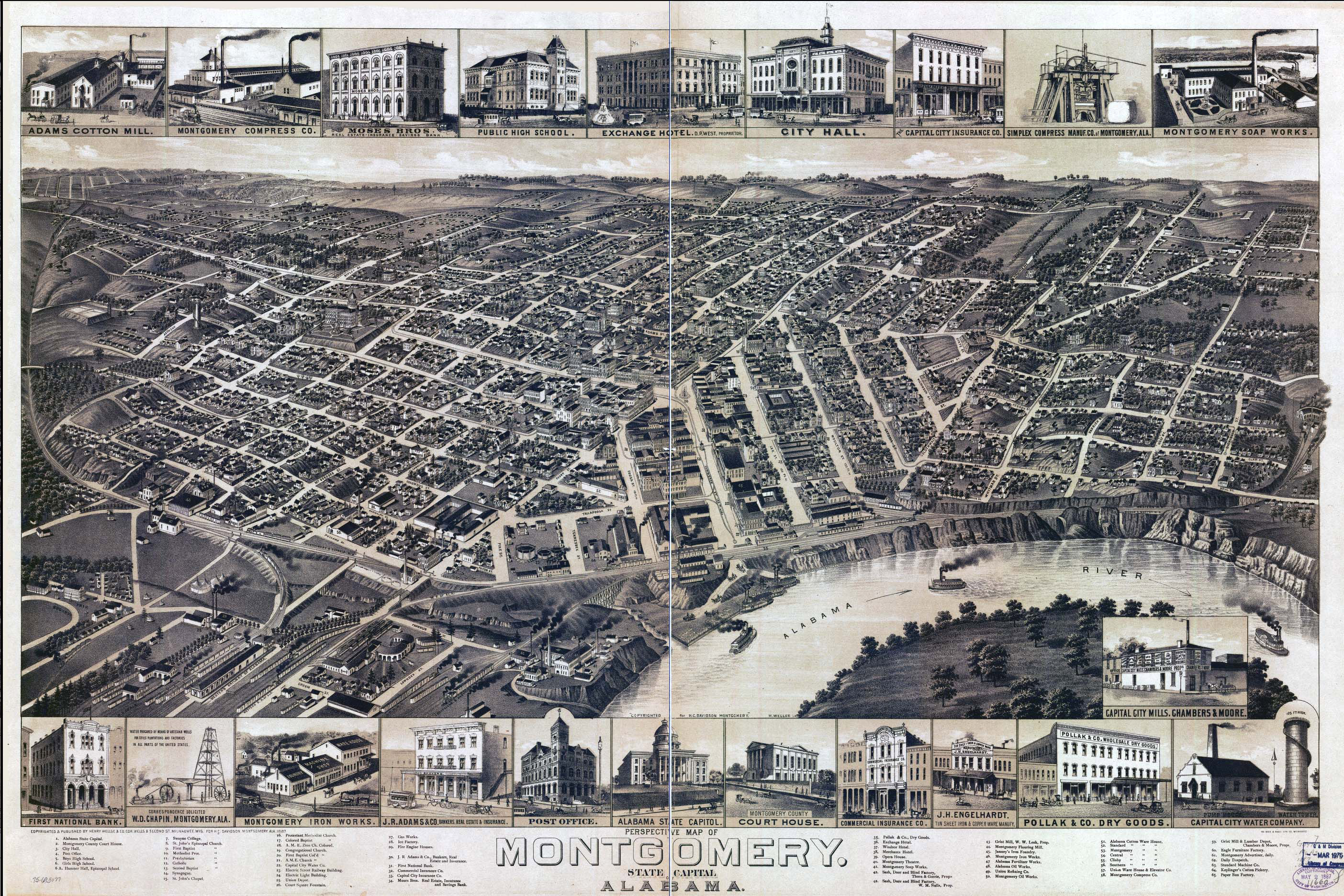
Bird's Eye View of Montgomery in 1887, Alabama
