= Theresa Burroughs =

American civil rights activist (1929–2019)

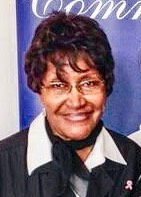
- Born: 1929
- Died: May 22, 2019 (aged 89–90); Greensboro, Alabama, U.S.
- Occupation: Activist

Theresa Burroughs (1929 – May 22, 2019) was an active participant in the civil rights movement during the 1960s. She worked to secure the right to vote for blacks in Alabama and the rest of the Southern United States. In 1965 she was attacked and arrested by state troopers and sheriff's deputies along with other civil rights demonstrators attempting to cross the Edmund Pettus Bridge in Selma, Alabama. She was the founder of the Safe House Black History Museum in Greensboro, Alabama, the location where the Reverend Dr. Martin Luther King Jr. was hidden from the Ku Klux Klan during his visit to Alabama in 1968. Burroughs was a childhood friend of King's wife, Coretta Scott King.

Burroughs was a cosmetologist and ran a beauty parlor called "In Beauty's Care" in Greensboro, which she opened a few years before the night she hid King in her mother's home next door to the beauty shop.

Theresa Burroughs came to StoryCorps to tell her daughter Toni Love about registering to vote. The interview took place on November 21, 2005, was recorded in Tuscaloosa, Alabama, and was featured in the book, “Listening Is an Act of Love” by Dave Isay.

Her parents were Mattie and Napoleon Turner. She died on May 25, 2019, in Greensboro, Alabama, at the age of 89.
