= Glencairn (Greensboro, Alabama) =

Historic house in Alabama, United States

- John Erwin House
- U.S. National Register of Historic Places
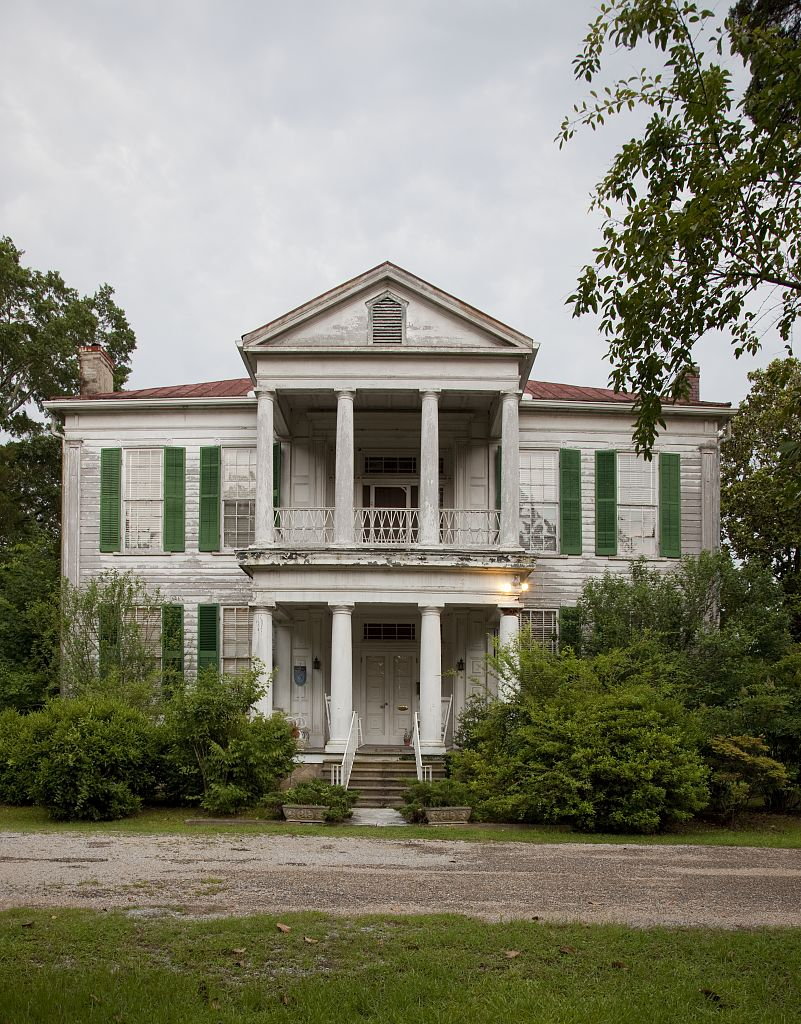
- Front facade of Glencairn in 2010, by Carol M. Highsmith

- Location within Alabama Location within the United States
- Location: 705 Erwin Drive; Greensboro, Alabama
- Coordinates: 32°42′2″N 87°35′45″W
- Built: 1835
- Architectural style: Greek Revival
- NRHP reference No.: 78000488
- Added to NRHP: January 18, 1978

Glencairn, also known as the John Erwin House, is a historic house in Greensboro, Alabama, United States. The house and grounds were recorded by the Historic American Buildings Survey in 1935. The house was added to the National Register of Historic Places on January 18, 1978, due to its architectural and historical significance.

== History ==
Construction on Glencairn began in 1830 and was completed in 1837 by John Erwin. Erwin was an influential attorney, slaveholder, and a Democratic politician. He was born on September 10, 1799, in Pendleton County, Virginia and had relocated to Alabama by 1821. He married Eliza Margaret Chadwick on October 5, 1822. He was elected as Greene County's (Note: Greensboro was located in Greene County at this time, Hale County was formed from the eastern half of Greene in 1867.) representative in the Alabama Senate in 1831 and was chosen as president pro tempore the next year. He went on to also serve in the lower house in 1836, 1837, and 1842. He was a Congressional candidate in 1845 and 1851, but was defeated in both instances. Erwin owned 169 slaves in 1860 and was a leader in the secession movement that led to the formation of the Confederate States of America. He was heavily involved in the 1852 and 1860 Democratic National Conventions.

Erwin died at Glencairn on December 10, 1860, and was interred in Greensboro Cemetery. His son, George Erwin, inherited Glencairn and owned it until his death in 1916. It then passed to George's son, Cadwallader Erwin, until his death in 1955. The home remained in the hands of John Erwin's ancestors, being occupied after Cadwallader Erwin by his daughter, Ida Vernon Mahood and her husband Danner Lee Mahood, until the former's passing in 1987. The house then passed to daughter Katherine Rugg and husband Samuel Rugg before going to daughter Audrey McCulloh in 2015. After her death in August of that year, the house passed to her widower Mark McCulloh, who resides there now and is overseeing renovations to the interior.

== Architecture ==
The two-story Greek Revival structure is frame construction. Some insist the style of the architecture is actually Georgian, a rarity among antebellum homes in the South. In any case, "Glencairn" features a five-bay main facade with a two-tiered portico over the central bay. The portico is supported by four Doric columns on each level, with Doric pilasters and elaborate wooden panels ornamenting the wall surface. The doorways on both levels are recessed and are surrounded by sidelights and a transom. A plain pediment crowns the portico. The exterior corners of the house have paneled pilasters, reaching up to a plain entablature above the second floor. The roof is hipped.

== Gallery ==
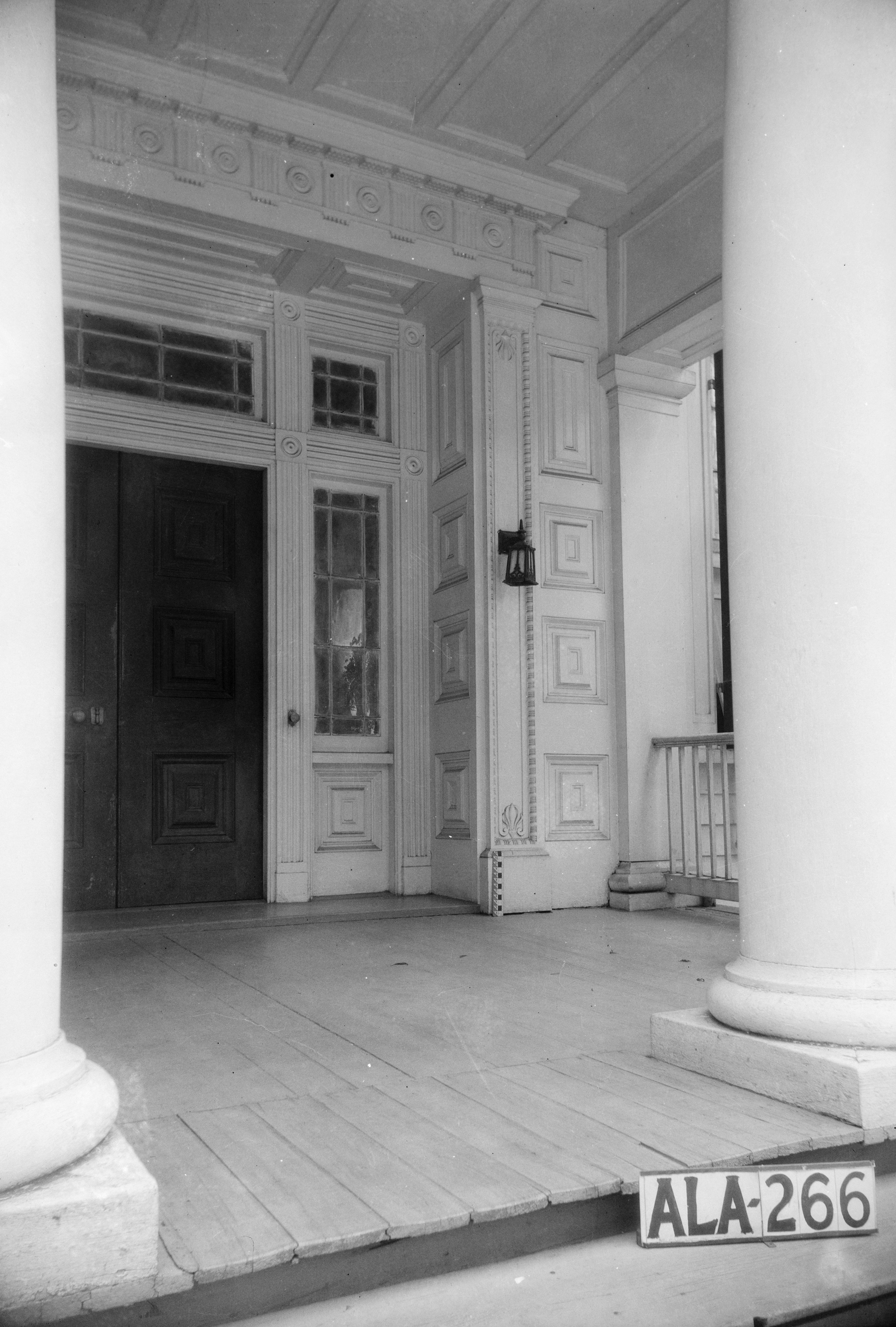
The front entrance

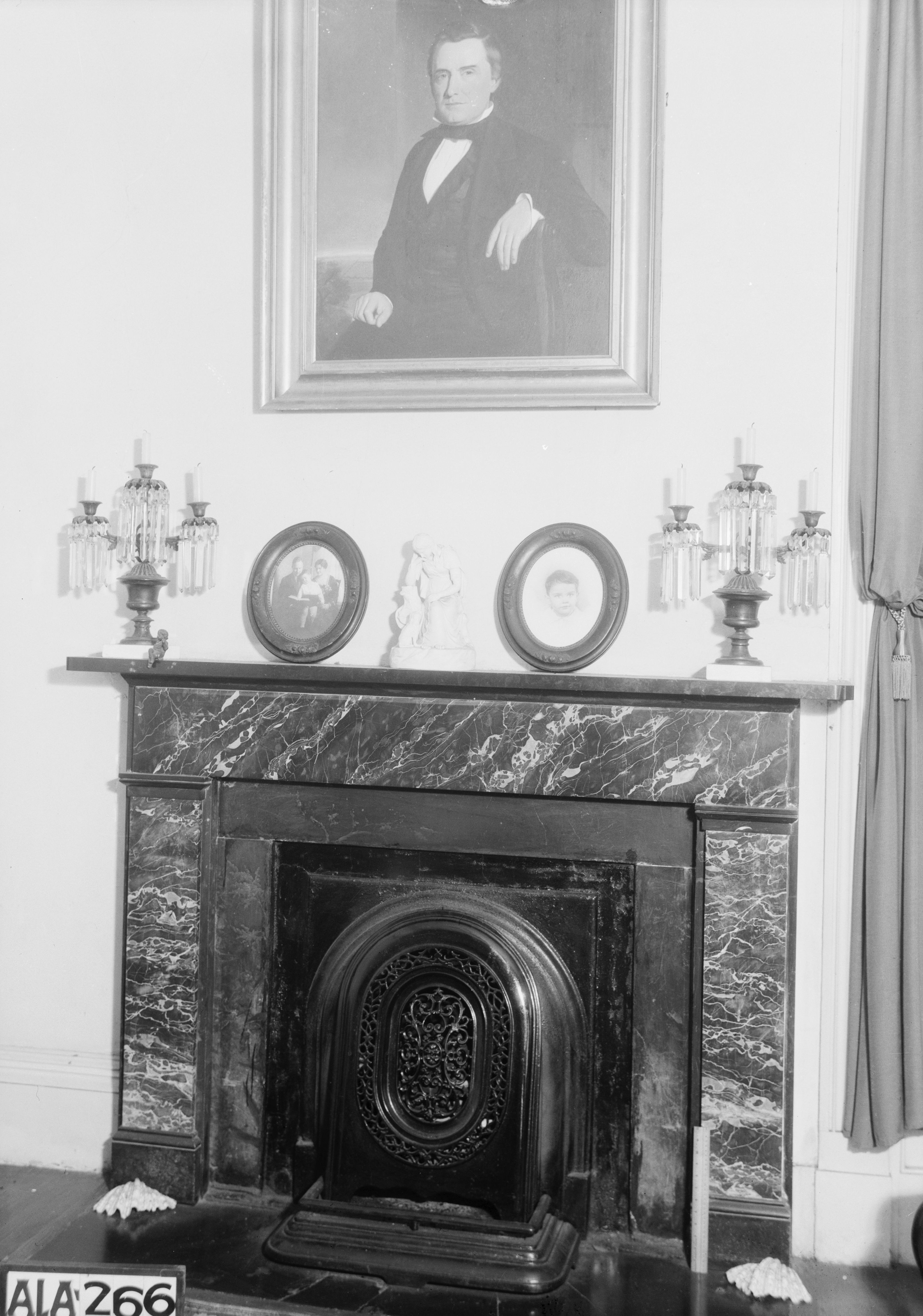
Mantel in the parlor

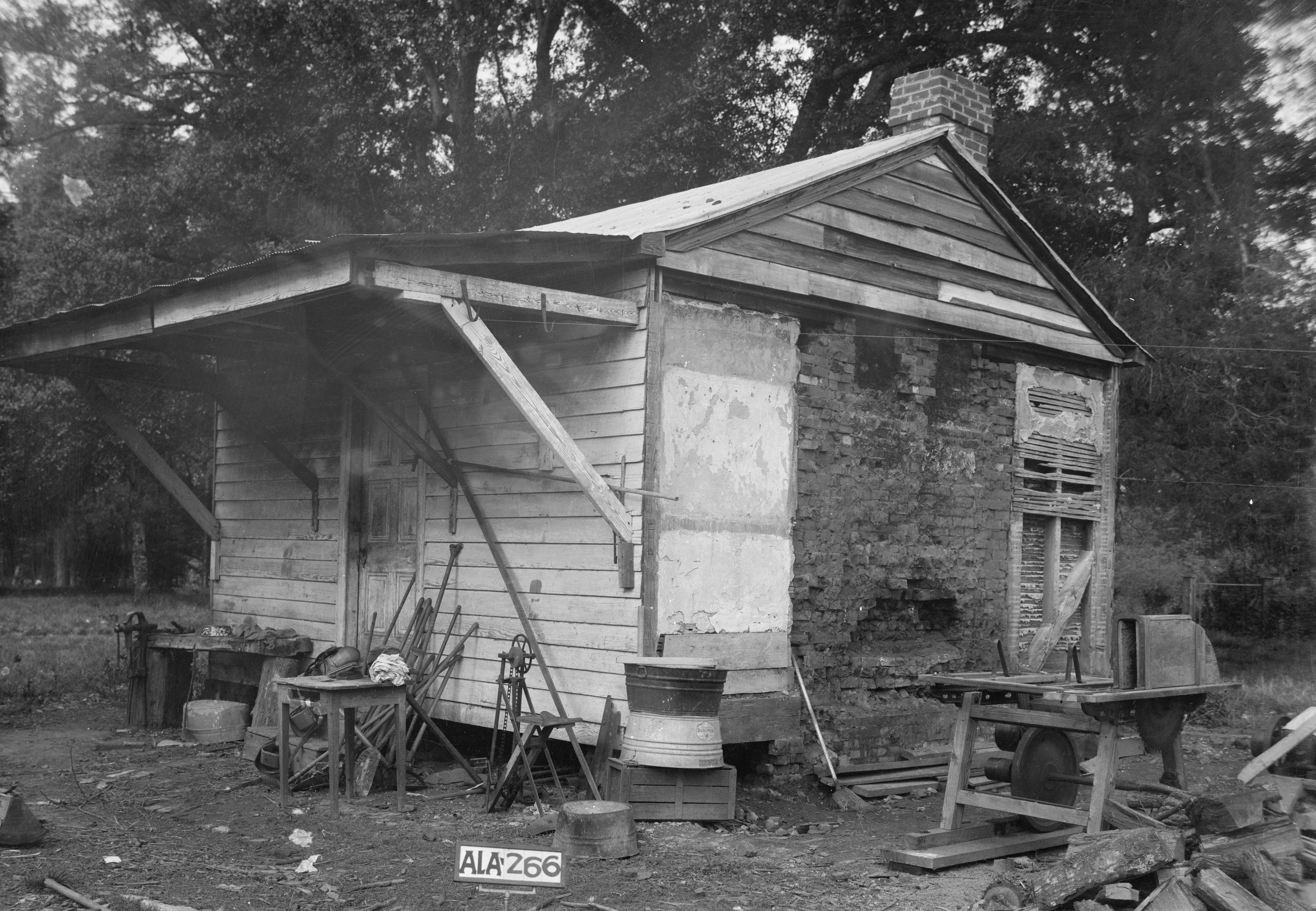
Former slave quarters

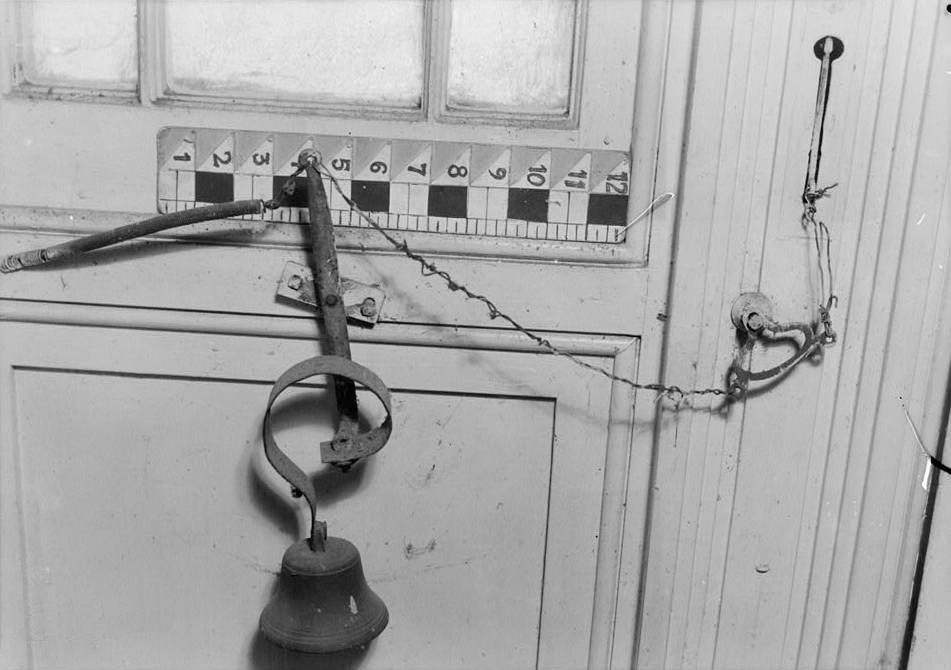
Detail of call bell system

Glencairn in 1935
