= Safe House Black History Museum =

Museum and cultural center in Greensboro, Alabama

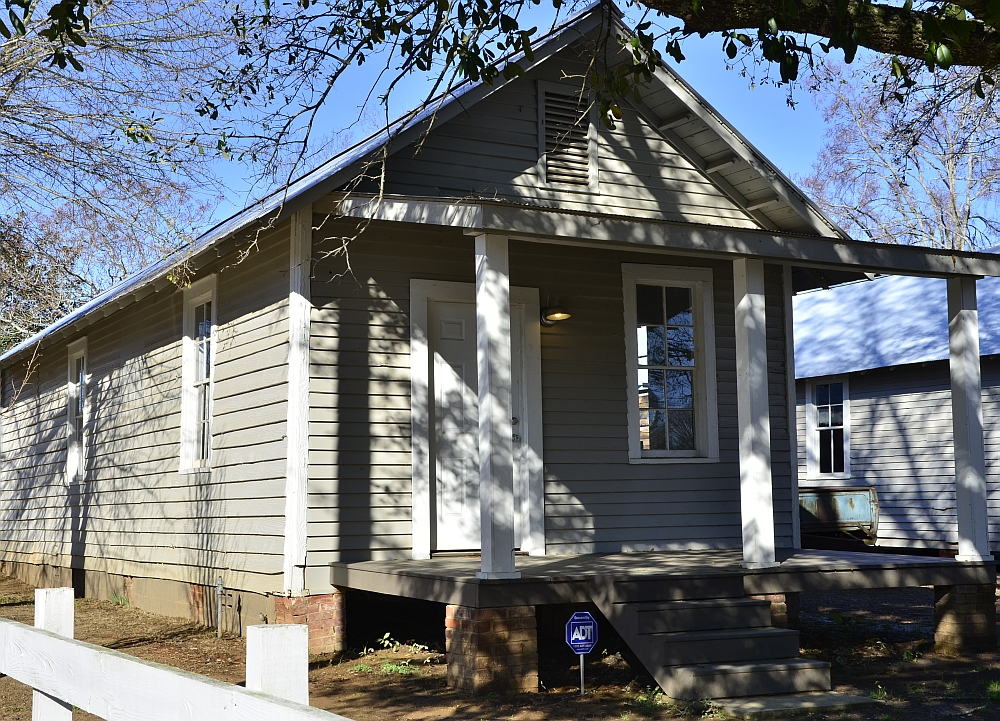
- Established: 2002
- Location: Greensboro, Alabama, US
- Coordinates: 32°41′52″N 87°36′35″W
- Type: History
- Founder: Theresa Burroughs
- Employees: none
- Website: safehousemuseum.org

The Safe House Black History Museum is a museum and cultural center in Greensboro, Alabama, United States. In March 1968, Martin Luther King Jr. used one of the museum's buildings as a safe house two weeks before he was assassinated on April 4 in Memphis.

== Founding and mission ==
The museum was founded in 2002 by Theresa Turner Burroughs. The museum's focus is the grass-roots activism in the rural Black Belt that led to the US civil rights movement.

== Description and use as a safe house ==
The museum is housed in neighboring shotgun houses in Greensboro's Depot neighborhood, homes originally built for employees of a local cotton gin. One of the houses, a three-room structure, was owned by the Burroughs family, who were local activists; Theresa Burroughs had been childhood friends with Coretta Scott King. Martin Luther King Jr. used it as a safe house on March 21, 1968, while being hunted by the Ku Klux Klan, shortly before his assassination.

== Displays ==
Displays include a pickup truck from which King gave a speech when local churches were afraid to allow him to speak in their buildings and mugshots of local activists who were arrested in protests and marches during the civil rights era, including the Greensboro marches, Bloody Sunday, and the 1965 march from Selma to Montgomery. A desk made for a local landowner by one of the people he enslaved is held in its collection.

== Recognition ==
In 2010, Auburn University's Rural Studio selected the museum as a project for architecture students. The buildings were renovated and their exteriors restored to their original style, and a covered gallery was built to connect them. In 2018, it was one of 20 Alabama sites important to civil rights history to be placed on the World Monument Fund's watch list.

== Funding ==
As of 2021, the museum operated on a $10,000 annual budget, had a volunteer executive director, and was open by appointment. Funding comes from donations, grants, admissions fees, and gift shop sales. As of 2024, funders included the city of Greensboro, the Alabama Humanities Alliance, and the Alabama African American Civil Rights Heritage Sites Consortium.
