= Greensboro, Alabama =

City in Alabama, United States

- City
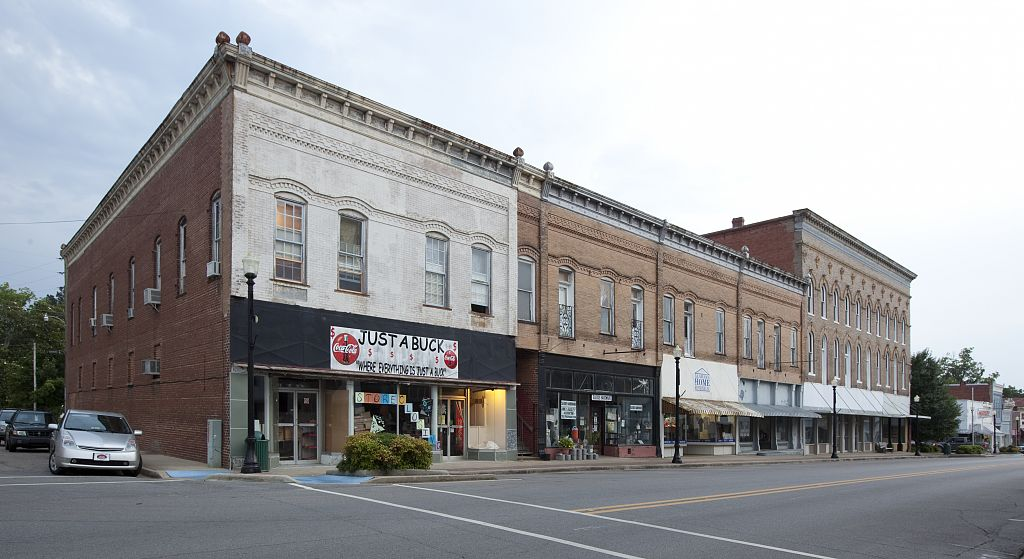
- Main Street in Greensboro

- Flag

- Location of Greensboro in Hale County, Alabama
- Coordinates: 32°42′05″N 87°35′42″W
- Country: United States
- State: Alabama
- County: Hale

Area
  - Total: 2.39 sq mi (6.18 km^{2})
  - Land: 2.38 sq mi (6.16 km^{2})
  - Water: 0.0077 sq mi (0.02 km^{2})
- Elevation: 269 ft (82 m)

Population (2020)
  - Total: 2,218
  - Density: 933.0/sq mi (360.25/km^{2})
- Time zone: UTC-6 (Central (CST))
  - Summer (DST): UTC-5 (CDT)
- ZIP code: 36744
- Area code: 334
- FIPS code: 01-31720
- GNIS feature ID: 2403743
- Website: https://www.cityofgreensboroalabama.com/

Greensboro is a city in Hale County, Alabama, United States. As of the 2020 census, Greensboro had a population of 2,218. The city is the county seat of Hale County, Alabama, which was not organized until 1867. It is part of the Tuscaloosa, Alabama metropolitan area.

== History ==
Greensboro was incorporated as a town in December 1823 as "Greensborough". It was named in honor of American Revolutionary War general Nathanael Greene. The name was soon simplified to "Greensboro". The community was known as "Troy" prior to incorporation.

Reflecting the history of the antebellum years and a culture built on cotton plantations to produce the commodity crop, several sites on the National Register of Historic Places in or near Greensboro are connected to this past. These include Glencairn, the Greensboro Historic District, Magnolia Grove, the McGehee-Stringfellow House, Millwood, and the Payne House.

One hundred years later, African Americans in Greensboro were among those in the state continuing to work to regain their civil rights after years of second-class status under Jim Crow.

Rev. Martin Luther King Jr., leader of the Southern Christian Leadership Conference, visited Greensboro in the course of his civil rights projects in the state. In 1968, after speaking in Greensboro, he hid from Ku Klux Klan members in what is now operated as the Safe House Black History Museum, then a private home owned by the Burroughs family, local activists and longtime family friends.

On May 27, 1973, a violent tornado struck the city, causing major damage across the area.

The southern part of the city was heavily damaged by a low-end EF2 tornado on January 12, 2023.

== Geography ==
Greensboro is slightly southeast of the center of Hale County and is crossed by Alabama State Routes 14, 25, and 69. SR 14 leads northwest 21 miles (34 km) to Eutaw and east 19 miles (31 km) to Marion. SR 25 leads northeast through Talladega National Forest 36 miles (58 km) to Brent and south 32 miles (51 km) to Thomaston. SR 69 leads north 38 miles (61 km) to Tuscaloosa and southwest 33 miles (53 km) to Linden. Demopolis is 25 miles (40 km) to the southwest via SR 69 and U.S. Route 80.

According to the U.S. Census Bureau, Greensboro has a total area of 2.4 square miles (6.2 km^{2}), of which 0.01 square miles (0.02 km^{2}), or 0.40%, are water.

=== Climate ===
The climate in this area is characterized by hot, humid summers and generally mild to cool winters. According to the Köppen Climate Classification system, Greensboro has a humid subtropical climate, abbreviated "Cfa" on climate maps.

Climate data for Greensboro, Alabama, 1991–2020 normals, extremes 1890–present
| Month | Jan | Feb | Mar | Apr | May | Jun | Jul | Aug | Sep | Oct | Nov | Dec | Year |
|---|---|---|---|---|---|---|---|---|---|---|---|---|---|
| Record high °F (°C) | 83 (28) | 87 (31) | 91 (33) | 95 (35) | 98 (37) | 105 (41) | 107 (42) | 107 (42) | 106 (41) | 100 (38) | 90 (32) | 82 (28) | 107 (42) |
| Mean maximum °F (°C) | 73.1 (22.8) | 77.0 (25.0) | 83.1 (28.4) | 86.5 (30.3) | 91.9 (33.3) | 95.8 (35.4) | 97.5 (36.4) | 97.9 (36.6) | 95.1 (35.1) | 89.0 (31.7) | 80.4 (26.9) | 74.2 (23.4) | 99.0 (37.2) |
| Mean daily maximum °F (°C) | 56.6 (13.7) | 60.9 (16.1) | 68.0 (20.0) | 74.5 (23.6) | 81.2 (27.3) | 87.3 (30.7) | 89.6 (32.0) | 89.4 (31.9) | 85.1 (29.5) | 76.2 (24.6) | 65.3 (18.5) | 57.8 (14.3) | 74.3 (23.5) |
| Daily mean °F (°C) | 46.4 (8.0) | 50.1 (10.1) | 56.5 (13.6) | 63.3 (17.4) | 71.0 (21.7) | 77.8 (25.4) | 80.6 (27.0) | 80.2 (26.8) | 75.3 (24.1) | 65.2 (18.4) | 54.4 (12.4) | 48.1 (8.9) | 64.1 (17.8) |
| Mean daily minimum °F (°C) | 36.1 (2.3) | 39.4 (4.1) | 45.0 (7.2) | 52.0 (11.1) | 60.7 (15.9) | 68.4 (20.2) | 71.6 (22.0) | 71.0 (21.7) | 65.4 (18.6) | 54.1 (12.3) | 43.4 (6.3) | 38.4 (3.6) | 53.8 (12.1) |
| Mean minimum °F (°C) | 18.3 (−7.6) | 23.0 (−5.0) | 27.8 (−2.3) | 35.8 (2.1) | 46.6 (8.1) | 58.9 (14.9) | 65.5 (18.6) | 64.4 (18.0) | 51.9 (11.1) | 37.4 (3.0) | 27.4 (−2.6) | 22.8 (−5.1) | 15.8 (−9.0) |
| Record low °F (°C) | −2 (−19) | −5 (−21) | 10 (−12) | 28 (−2) | 37 (3) | 41 (5) | 56 (13) | 55 (13) | 39 (4) | 27 (−3) | 12 (−11) | 2 (−17) | −5 (−21) |
| Average precipitation inches (mm) | 5.11 (130) | 5.63 (143) | 5.32 (135) | 5.32 (135) | 4.60 (117) | 3.89 (99) | 4.38 (111) | 3.99 (101) | 3.65 (93) | 3.34 (85) | 4.57 (116) | 5.07 (129) | 54.87 (1,394) |
| Average snowfall inches (cm) | 0.2 (0.51) | 0.0 (0.0) | 0.0 (0.0) | 0.0 (0.0) | 0.0 (0.0) | 0.0 (0.0) | 0.0 (0.0) | 0.0 (0.0) | 0.0 (0.0) | 0.0 (0.0) | 0.0 (0.0) | 0.0 (0.0) | 0.2 (0.51) |
| Average precipitation days (≥ 0.01 in) | 8.5 | 8.4 | 8.8 | 7.2 | 7.2 | 7.6 | 10.0 | 8.5 | 5.5 | 5.5 | 6.9 | 8.0 | 92.1 |
| Average snowy days (≥ 0.1 in) | 0.1 | 0.0 | 0.0 | 0.0 | 0.0 | 0.0 | 0.0 | 0.0 | 0.0 | 0.0 | 0.0 | 0.0 | 0.1 |
Source 1: NOAA
Source 2: National Weather Service

== Demographics ==
Historical population
| Census | Pop. | Note | %± |
|---|---|---|---|
| 1850 | 2,500 | | — |
| 1870 | 1,760 | | — |
| 1880 | 1,833 | | 4.1% |
| 1890 | 1,759 | | −4.0% |
| 1900 | 2,416 | | 37.4% |
| 1910 | 2,048 | | −15.2% |
| 1920 | 1,809 | | −11.7% |
| 1930 | 1,795 | | −0.8% |
| 1940 | 2,034 | | 13.3% |
| 1950 | 2,217 | | 9.0% |
| 1960 | 3,081 | | 39.0% |
| 1970 | 3,371 | | 9.4% |
| 1980 | 3,248 | | −3.6% |
| 1990 | 3,047 | | −6.2% |
| 2000 | 2,731 | | −10.4% |
| 2010 | 2,497 | | −8.6% |
| 2020 | 2,218 | | −11.2% |
U.S. Decennial Census; 2013 Estimate

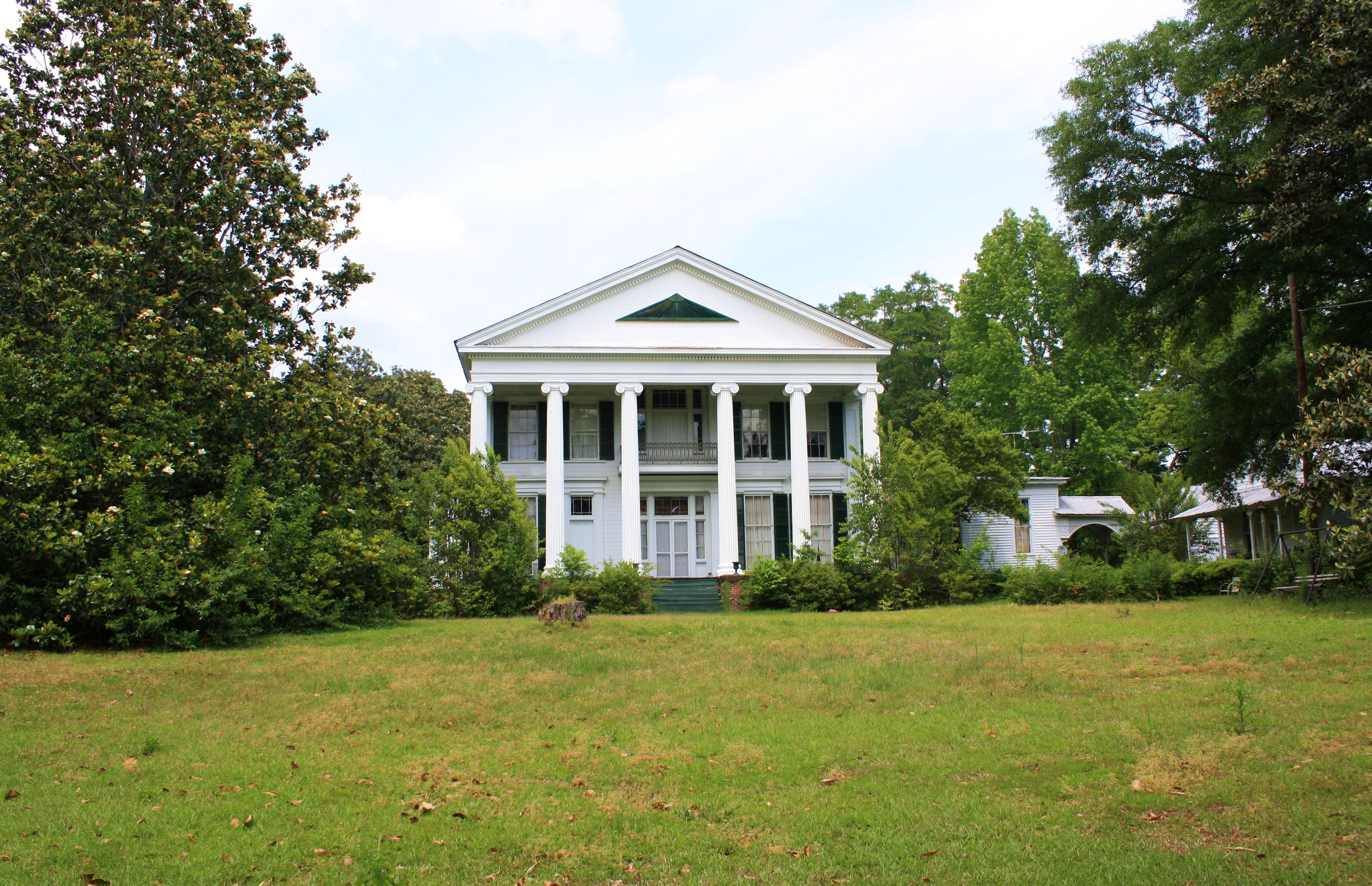
Magnolia Hall, also known as the McCrary-Otts House, on Otts Street

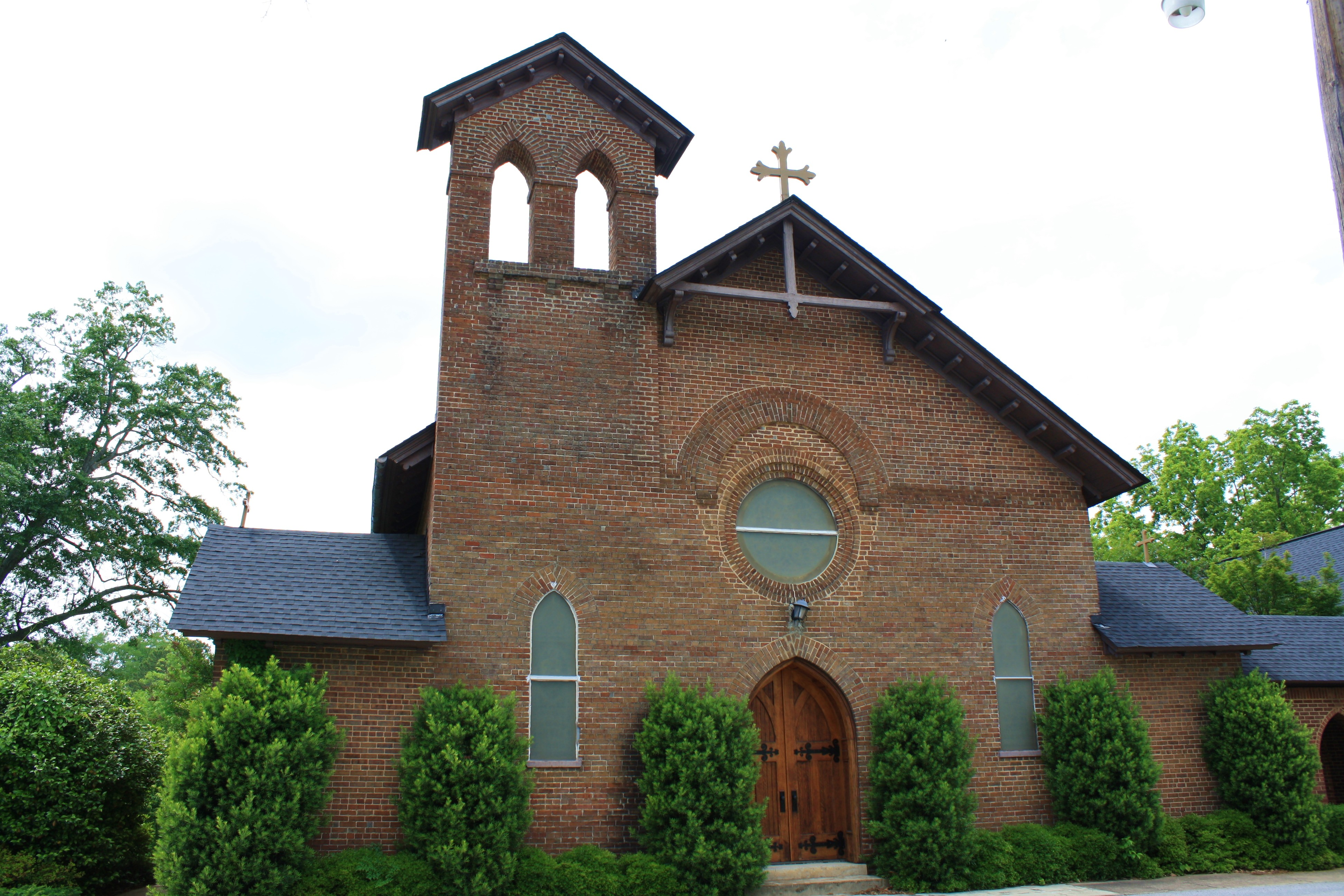
St. Paul's Episcopal Church on Church Street

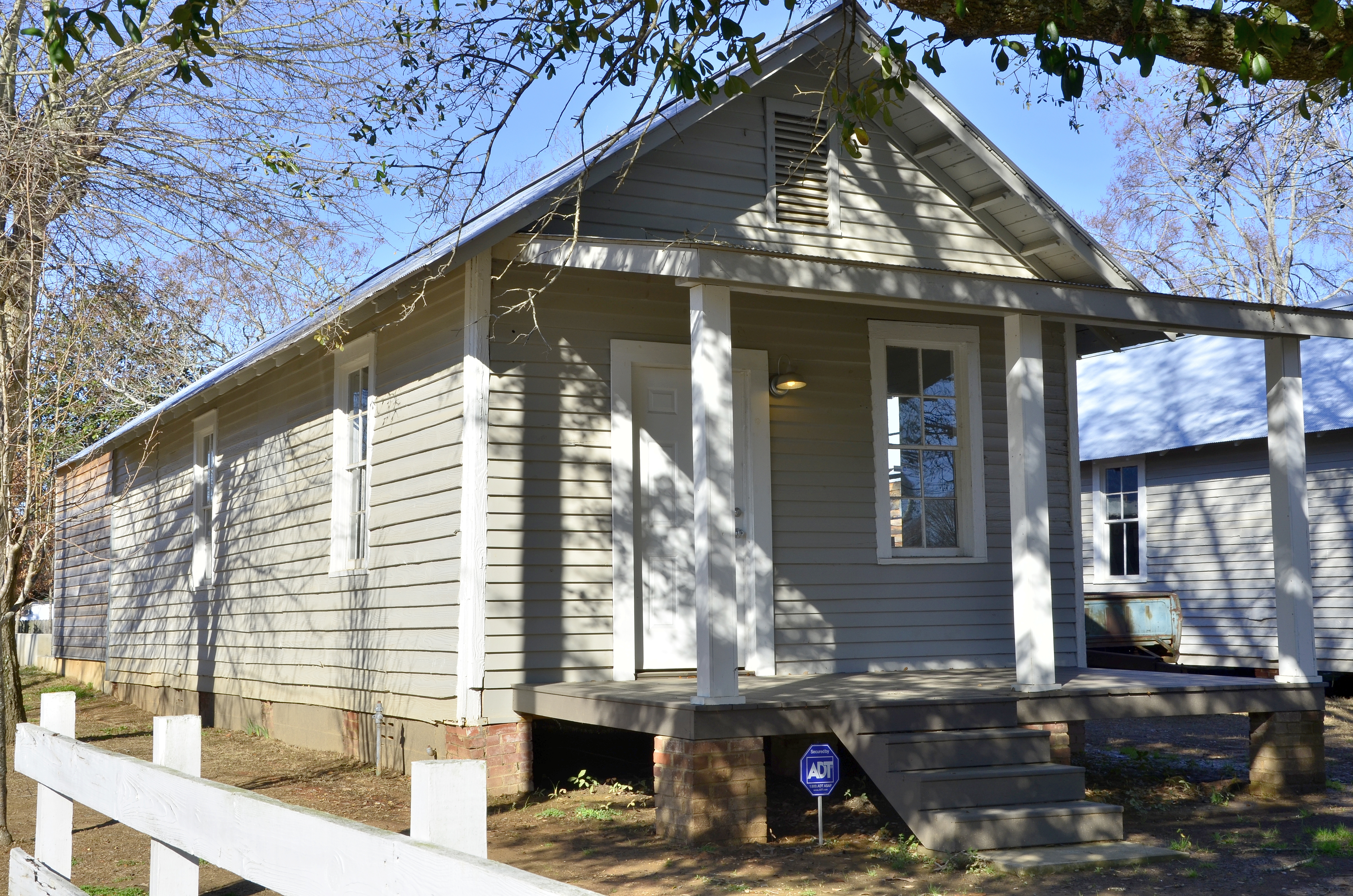
The Safe House Black Historic Museum in Greensboro. Martin Luther King Jr. hid here in 1968 to avoid the Ku Klux Klan. The home is now a museum documenting African-American history and the Civil Rights Movement.

=== Racial and ethnic composition ===
Greensboro city, Alabama – Racial and ethnic composition Note: the US Census treats Hispanic/Latino as an ethnic category. This table excludes Latinos from the racial categories and assigns them to a separate category. Hispanics/Latinos may be of any race. Race and ethnicity was not surveyed in Alabama for populations under 2,500 in the 1980 census and under 1,000 in 1990 census.
| Race / Ethnicity (NH = Non-Hispanic) | Pop 1980 | Pop 1990 | Pop 2000 | Pop 2010 | Pop 2020 | % 1980 | % 1990 | % 2000 | % 2010 | % 2020 |
|---|---|---|---|---|---|---|---|---|---|---|
| White alone (NH) | 1,249 | 1,129 | 1,045 | 793 | 646 | 38.45% | 37.05% | 38.26% | 31.76% | 29.13% |
| Black or African American alone (NH) | 1,914 | 1,896 | 1,646 | 1,654 | 1,503 | 58.93% | 62.23% | 60.27% | 66.24% | 67.76% |
| Native American or Alaska Native alone (NH) | 0 | 4 | 1 | 4 | 5 | 0.00% | 0.13% | 0.04% | 0.16% | 0.23% |
| Asian alone (NH) | 6 | 4 | 0 | 20 | 7 | 0.18% | 0.13% | 0.00% | 0.80% | 0.32% |
| Native Hawaiian or Pacific Islander alone (NH) | x | x | 0 | 0 | 2 | x | x | 0.00% | 0.00% | 0.09% |
| Other race alone (NH) | 0 | 0 | 0 | 0 | 0 | 0.00% | 0.00% | 0.00% | 0.00% | 0.00% |
| Mixed race or Multiracial (NH) | x | x | 15 | 14 | 40 | x | x | 0.55% | 0.56% | 1.80% |
| Hispanic or Latino (any race) | 79 | 14 | 24 | 12 | 15 | 2.43% | 0.46% | 0.88% | 0.48% | 0.68% |
| Total | 3,248 | 3,047 | 2,731 | 2,497 | 2,218 | 100.00% | 100.00% | 100.00% | 100.00% | 100.00% |

=== 2020 census ===
As of the 2020 census, Greensboro had a population of 2,218. The median age was 41.9 years. 23.5% of residents were under the age of 18 and 21.9% of residents were 65 years of age or older. For every 100 females there were 80.8 males, and for every 100 females age 18 and over there were 74.1 males age 18 and over.

0.0% of residents lived in urban areas, while 100.0% lived in rural areas.

There were 959 households and 648 families in Greensboro; 30.0% of households had children under the age of 18 living in them. Of all households, 23.0% were married-couple households, 20.5% were households with a male householder and no spouse or partner present, and 50.7% were households with a female householder and no spouse or partner present. About 37.6% of households were made up of individuals and 18.7% had someone living alone who was 65 years of age or older.

There were 1,089 housing units, of which 11.9% were vacant. The homeowner vacancy rate was 0.8% and the rental vacancy rate was 7.2%.

=== 2010 census ===
As of the census of 2010, there were 2,497 people, 1,045 households, and 629 families living in the city. The population density was 1,040.4 inhabitants per square mile (401.7/km^{2}). There were 1,195 housing units at an average density of 497.9 per square mile (192.2/km^{2}). The racial makeup of the city was 66.5% Black or African American, 32.0% White, 0.2% Native American, and 0.6% from two or more races. 0.5% of the population were Hispanic or Latino of any race.

There were 1,045 households, of which 25.6% had children under the age of 18 living with them, 30.4% were married couples living together, 25.2% had a female householder with no husband present, and 39.8% were non-families. 37.0% of households were one person and 15.9% were one person aged 65 or older. The average household size was 2.31 and the average family size was 3.07.

The age distribution was 24.9% under the age of 18, 7.9% from 18 to 24, 20.5% from 25 to 44, 26.8% from 45 to 64, and 19.9% 65 or older. The median age was 42 years. For every 100 females, there were 81.1 males. For every 100 females age 18 and over, there were 88.3 males.

The median household income was $30,082 and the median family income was $36,379. Males had a median income of $28,869 versus $22,528 for females. The per capita income for the city was $16,277. About 19.0% of families and 23.8% of the population were below the poverty line, including 34.9% of those under age 18 and 23.7% of those age 65 or over.

=== 2000 census ===
As of the census of 2000, there were 2,731 people, 1,026 households, and 688 families living in the city. The population density was 1,146.5 inhabitants per square mile (442.7/km^{2}). There were 1,142 housing units at an average density of 479.4 per square mile (185.1/km^{2}). The racial makeup of the city was 38.30% White, 60.89% Black or African American, 0.04% Native American, and 0.77% from two or more races. 0.88% of the population were Hispanic or Latino of any race.

There were 1,026 households, of which 32.3% had children under the age of 18 living with them, 35.1% were married couples living together, 27.3% had a female householder with no husband present, and 32.9% were non-families. 31.2% of households were one person and 14.6% were one person aged 65 or older. The average household size was 2.56 and the average family size was 3.21.

The age distribution was 28.6% under the age of 18, 10.5% from 18 to 24, 20.9% from 25 to 44, 20.5% from 45 to 64, and 19.4% 65 or older. The median age was 37 years. For every 100 females, there were 86.8 males. For every 100 females age 18 and over, there were 74.6 males.

The median household income was $22,930 and the median family income was $28,990. Males had a median income of $36,071 versus $23,224 for females. The per capita income for the city was $13,271. About 27.2% of families and 35.3% of the population were below the poverty line, including 47.1% of those under age 18 and 26.2% of those age 65 or over.

== Government and infrastructure ==
The city of Greensboro has a mayor-council form of government. There is a full-time police force with approximately 13 officers. The city has a volunteer fire department.

Greensboro is served by one public K-12 public school, Greensboro Public School, with two campuses. There is one private K-12 school, Southern Academy.

== Notable people ==
- Anthony Bryant, defensive tackle in the NFL
- Scott Burton, sculptor and performance artist
- Theresa Burroughs, civil rights activist and founder of Greensboro's Safe House Museum
- Alfred Chapman, Los Angeles real estate attorney and investor, and one of the founders of Orange, California
- John Gayle, seventh governor of the U.S. state of Alabama (1831–1835)
- Amelia Gayle Gorgas, former librarian for the University of Alabama and mother of Surgeon General William C. Gorgas
- Cedric Harris, Educator, Innovator, Youth Mentor
- Richmond Pearson Hobson (1870–1937), member of the United States House of Representatives and Medal of Honor recipient
- Grady Jackson, professional football player
- Pete Jarman (1892–1955), member of the United States House of Representatives and former United States Ambassador to Australia
- Herb Jones (1998-), New Orleans Pelicans basketball player, former Alabama Crimson Tide Basketball player.
- Andrew Killgore (1919–2016), United States Foreign Service Officer and ambassador to Qatar
- Thomas E. Knight, 13th Lieutenant Governor of Alabama and 19th Attorney General of Alabama
- Hedgemon Lewis, boxer, former world title contender
- Sydenham Moore, (1817-1862), lawyer, judge, officer Mexican-American War & Confederate Army, Brig General of Alabama State militia, US Congressman elected to represent Alabama, 1857 to 1861.
- William Burns Paterson, teacher, founder of Tullibody Academy and Alabama State University
- Israel Pickens, third governor of Alabama (1821–1825)
- Eugene Sawyer, 53rd mayor of Chicago (1987-1989)
- Thomas Seay, 27th governor of Alabama (1886–1890)
- Armistead I. Selden, Jr. (1921–1985), member of the United States House of Representatives and former United States Ambassador to New Zealand, Fiji, the Kingdom of Tonga, and Western Samoa
- Little Sonny, electric blues musician and songwriter
- Barry Wagner, former wide receiver/linebacker in the Arena Football League
- Bob Wiggins, outfielder in the Negro American League
- Henry Williams, former NFL defensive back
- Lamanzer Williams, former NFL defensive end
