= Evil Lives Here =

US television program

- Genre: Documentary
- Directed by: J. Tom Pougue; Joe Pincosy; Phoebe Kwong; Justin Lee Stanley; Bryan C. Marsh; Colin Herlihy
- Theme music composer: John Congleton
- Opening theme: "What's So Amazing About Grace?" by The Paper Chase
- Composer: John Congleton
- Country of origin: United States
- No. of seasons: 19
- No. of episodes: 176

Production
- Executive producers: Stephen Dost; Kevin Fitzpatrick; Jonathan Santos
- Producers: Jacinda A. Davis; Joe Carmina; Jaime Hanaway; Chris Sgueglia; Andrea Calmon
- Running time: 42 minutes
- Production company: Red Marble Media

Original release
- Network: Investigation Discovery
- Release: January 17, 2016 – present

Evil Lives Here is an American documentary television series on Investigation Discovery that debuted on January 17, 2016. This 60-minute true crime show spends each episode interviewing a family member of the highlighted criminal.

On August 23, 2020, Season 8 kicked off with a 90-minute episode called "I Killed Dirty John", on which Debra and Terra Newell recount their experiences with "Dirty" John Meehan. The format is featured on the spinoff series, Evil Lives Here: Shadows of Death, in which both investigators and families of victims discuss the impacts murders had on their lives. Unlike its predecessor, the culprit isn't revealed right away in some episodes.

A spinoff sequel, Evil Lives Here: The Killer Speaks premiered on October 1, 2023, and is about murders told from the perspectives of the killers and at least one surviving family member.

Another sequel series, Evil Lives Here: My Child The Killer will premiere on Investigation Discovery on March 31, 2026. This series is about parents whose children grew up to become murderers.

== Premise ==
What if the person closest to you, were a devil in disguise. Would you see the signs?

— Onscreen text of the premise during the show's opening sequence

The show depicts the stories of people who shared a home and a life with a loved one who would become a killer, whether it be a parent, sibling, extended family member, or even offspring. Reenactments blended with police footage, family photographs, videos and interviews give the audience a view of the murderer as told through the eyes of someone close to them.

Most episodes are done solo with only one person close to the person who committed heinous acts telling the story, though there are a few with two people featured. The producers are sometimes heard in the background asking questions of the person or persons being interviewed. Every episode depicts the person looking at pictures of themselves and or the suspect to reminisce on certain moments in their lives whether it be good or bad.

== Episodes ==
Season	Episodes	Originally released	
Season	Episodes	First released	Last released
1	6	January 17, 2016	February 28, 2016
2	10	January 1, 2017	March 19, 2017
3	12	January 1, 2018	April 8, 2018
4	8	August 13, 2018	October 1, 2018
5	12	January 1, 2019	April 7, 2019
6	8	June 4, 2019	September 1, 2019
7	12	January 5, 2020	March 22, 2020
8	7	August 23, 2020	October 25, 2020
9	8	February 14, 2021	May 16, 2021
10	13	July 11, 2021	October 17, 2021
11	8	February 20, 2022	April 10, 2022
12	6	July 4, 2022	August 8, 2022
13	10	January 22, 2023	April 10, 2023
14	8	August 6, 2023	September 24, 2023
15	10	February 18, 2024	April 28, 2024
16	8	August 25, 2024	October 20, 2024
17	10	February 16, 2025	April 20, 2025
18	10	July 13, 2025	September 21, 2025
19	10	January 14, 2026	March 25, 2026

=== Season 1 (2016) ===
No. overall	No. in season	Title	Original release date	U.S viewers (millions)
1	1	"Something Is Different About Robbie"	January 17, 2016	1.81
The parents of Robbie Hawkins recount his descent into madness, culminating in a shooting spree at an Omaha shopping mall, and his suicide after killing eight people.
2	2	"My Brother's Secret"	January 24, 2016	1.64
Danyall White has always thought her brother was a prankster with lively fantasies. But all that Richard confessed to her is true.
3	3	"Cheating Death"	January 31, 2016	1.44
Sweet 16-year-old Cathy just wanted someone to love and care for her. She meets Peter Tobin, a man who was two times older than she is. She never knew she married a brutal serial killer. Peter Tobin died on October 8, 2022, at age 76.
4	4	"The Prophet"	February 14, 2016	1.15
To Kevin Currie, Mormon prophet Jeffrey Lundgren was more than a spiritual leader, he was a brother. But before long, Kevin realized that this man of God was really a devil in disguise with an evil plan.
5	5	"In Love with the Devil"	February 21, 2016	1.23
When Bernadette was 17, her boyfriend, Brian Sugrim, confessed that he committed a murder. She did not believe him because she was in love. But as soon as the couple were married, the charming boyfriend transformed into a violent and abusive husband.
6	6	"Home Sweet Nightmare"	February 28, 2016	1.22
Sheila Janutolo dreaded being alone with her husband, Jim Cruz. Over the years, she had learned to fear him and his violent temper. But when she got a call that he had been arrested for a ghastly crime, she was certain police had the wrong man.

=== Season 2 (2017) ===
No. overall	No. in season	Title	Original release date
7	1	"Not My Boy"	January 1, 2017
George and Margaret Keller tell the story about their son, Paul Kenneth Keller, who was responsible for three deadly arson attacks. Note: This episode re-aired on September 20, 2020, under the alternate title, "My Love For My Boy Is Unchanged".
8	2	"She Made Me Do It"	January 8, 2017
Eric Witte's father taught him to always protect his family. Unfortunately, Eric cannot protect his mother and siblings from the obvious danger: his abusive father Paul Witte himself.
9	3	"My Brother, the Devil"	January 22, 2017
Warren Jeffs is a cult leader with a large following. This story is told from the perspective of his brother, Wallace, and nephew, Brent. Warren is now in prison.
10	4	"The Horror I Don't Remember"	January 29, 2017
Brian Britton goes on a murderous rampage in his own home in Poughkeepsie, New York. His older sister, Sherry, is the sole survivor, having been brutally shot while she slept. To this day, she is making sure that he stays in prison to prevent him from killing her.
11	5	"Son of the Prophet"	February 12, 2017
Dennis Ryan talks about his father, Michael W. Ryan, who lead the most violent and xenophobic cult ever; the Followers of Yahweh, a Christian Identity group.
12	6	"My Secret Nightmare"	February 19, 2017
As a child, Tiffany Shore hated her father, Anthony Allen Shore, with a burning passion. But she is the only one who hates him. Her mother, her siblings and the whole neighborhood are all fond of him. They do not see the monster behind him.
13	7	"My Brother's Secrets"	February 26, 2017
Sean Lewis always believed that his brother, Patrick, did bad things because he got involved with a disreputable company. But he realized at the end that his brother was the one who was the snake.
14	8	"Our House of Horrors"	March 5, 2017
Alice Swafford meets the much younger William Choyce in Oakland, California. She thinks that she met her true Prince Charming, but he has a hidden evil side in his soul.
15	9	"Trapped in Hell"	March 12, 2017
When Susan Hamlin walks into a police station to confess that she is part of a Satanic cult and plans to murder her husband, Richard Hamlin, no one could guess that the truth is even more bizarre and sinister, or that it is all part of her own desperate escape plan.
16	10	"On the Run"	March 19, 2017
Lindsay is able to go on the run from her own abusive father Matthew Wrinkles, but not without living in fear of the harm he may inflict if and when he tracks her down.

=== Season 3 (2018) ===
No. overall	No. in season	Title	Original release date	U.S viewers (millions)
17	1	"He Comes To My Dreams"	January 1, 2018	1.16
Gwen Baily fell in love with Norman Starnes, who has a short temper.
18	2	"The Monster I Married"	January 7, 2018	1.46
Cindy falls in love with the most popular boy at school. She discovers the less attractive side of Bobby Joe Long, but she has no idea that she will marry a serial killer in the future. Note: This episode re-aired on August 31, 2020, under the alternate title, "The Tampa Bay Killer".
19	3	"Deadly Fetish"	January 14, 2018	1.45
When Debra Davis meets and marries Robert Ben Rhoades, she becomes an unwilling participant in his "games", which include bondage, sadomasochism, and worst of all, brutal murders.
20	4	"The Black Widow"	January 21, 2018	1.32
When Cindy Taylor was a teen, her world was shattered by the sudden death of her father. Police said it was a heart attack, but years later she would discover her father's death was just one of the deadly secrets her mother, Blanche Taylor Moore had been hiding from her. Note: This episode re-aired on October 11, 2020, under the alternate title, "My Mother's Lies".
21	5	"My Son's Prisoner"	January 28, 2018	1.64
Shelly Lietz quickly realizes she is at the mercy of her son, Derek. Not even his stepfather, Bob, or his wife, Maisie, can stop his destructive behavior.
22	6	"First Love, Forever Evil"	February 11, 2018	1.18
Melissa Holland was an easy target for bullying at school until she became the girlfriend of Michael Dean Overstreet. She thought he would protect her, but in the long term she needed to be protected from him.
23	7	"The Soap Star's Secret"	February 18, 2018	1.22
Thom Bierdz had finally made it big as an actor. When he brought his troubled younger brother out to Los Angeles, he thought he could help set him straight. He never expected that the price he would pay for being wrong would be the life of someone he loved. Note: This episode re-aired on March 26, 2023, under the title "From Hollywood To Hell".
24	8	"The Cop and the Killer"	February 25, 2018	1.37
When Walt Chavis joined the police force, he was prepared to risk his life, but he never imagined the greatest threat he would face would be his own brother or that one day he would be forced to choose between his duty and his family.
25	9	"Blood Atonement"	March 4, 2018	1.26
Estephania LeBaron was raised to believe that her father, Ervil LeBaron and brothers were Mormon holy men, and that the terrible things they did in God's name were just. But she questions everything when faced with having to do the same terrible things herself.
26	10	"The Demon In His Eyes"	March 11, 2018	1.12
As children, Betty and her sister, Ulayla Rose, adored their little brother, Johnny. But when Johnny grew up, they discover that he is not that cute, innocent little brother any more.
27	11	"Put On A Happy Face"	March 18, 2018	1.29
Melissa Moore from Canada loved being Daddy's little girl. But now, she is ashamed of her father, Keith Jesperson, because he was the notorious Happy Face Killer.
28	12	"The Monster Inside Him"	April 8, 2018	1.21
When Richard Ellerbee got married, his sister, Karen, was relieved and hopes that she will have nothing to do with him. But Richard has not disappeared from her life, as he continued to destroy her life and his marriage as well.

=== Season 4 (2018) ===
No. overall	No. in season	Title	Original release date	U.S viewers (millions)
29	1	"I Invited Him In"	August 13, 2018	1.16
Jill Garrison finds out that her boyfriend Nathaniel White killed six women around Goshen, New York, including her own niece, Christine.
30	2	"In the Lion's Cage"	August 20, 2018	1.16
Terry Jo Howard and Linda Wittmier are both in love with James Michael Randall, who becomes a twisted, lewd killer.
31	3	"The Last Blanco"	August 27, 2018	1.15
Michael Blanco adores his mother, Griselda Blanco. She was rich, elegant, and had an influence on many people. Even his tough father has awe for her. And not without reason, because his mother was a notorious mob boss.
32	4	"Fear thy Father"	September 3, 2018	1.13
Charles Sexton abides by the religious teachings of his father, Eddie Lee Sexton. That is, until Eddie goes too far, leading to numerous illicit marriages, murders, and arrests.
33	5	"Something Wasn't Right"	September 10, 2018	1.13
When Reginald Brooks started to exhibit strange behavior, his wife, Beverly Stephens, did not realize that the behavior was signs of him becoming a cold-blooded killer.
34	6	"Master Manipulator"	September 17, 2018	1.12
When Brian Cargill divorced his ex-wife, Kimberly Cargill, he thought he was going to be finally free. He did not realize the brash emotional impact his ex-wife had on their son, Jamie.
35	7	"The Grim Reaper"	September 24, 2018	0.86
When Linda discovered that her biological father was her family friend, Greg Scarpa, she was overjoyed. But when the secrets about her new family comes out, she wished that she had never discovered the truth.
36	8	"We Looked Happy"	October 1, 2018	0.98
On the surface, Stephanie and Brooke Lehman seem to be part of a happy family. But husband and father, Kevin Dunlap, is making their lives, and those of others, a living Hell.

=== Season 5 (2019) ===
No. overall	No. in season	Title	Original release date	U.S viewers (millions)
37	1	"You Know My Brother's Name"	January 1, 2019	1.34
The sister and niece of serial killer John Wayne Gacy tell how his modus operandi affected their lives, and describe the complete details, right up to the day of his execution. Note: This episode re-aired on March 3, 2019, under the alternate title, "My Infamous Brother".
38	2	"Let Her Rot"	January 6, 2019	1.63
Joshua Hudnall tells the story of the evil ways of his mother, Stephanie, up to and including the way she got his sister, Guenevere, to kill his father with an ax. He died of liver failure at the age of 27, discovered in his truck shortly after this episode was taped.
39	3	"Evil Undercover"	January 13, 2019	1.49
Lori McLeod sees Scott Lee Kimball as the ideal man for her. But she finds out the hard way that he is living a lie when her daughter, Kaysi, mysteriously disappears. Now suffering from terminal breast cancer, she seeks to warn other wives and daughters about letting just any man into their lives.
40	4	"Under His Thumb"	January 20, 2019	1.14
Jamie Clark ignores all the warnings of her friends and her family who did not like Anthony Lord. She could not believe that the big friendly giant was, in fact, a terrible monster.
41	5	"He's Still My Son"	January 27, 2019	1.43
Walter Stawicki always known his son, Ian, was a unruly misfit. He tried hard protect his son from the demons in his head who tell him the world is bad and humans are bad, but he failed to stop his son's biggest crime ever.
42	6	"I Was His First Victim"	February 10, 2019	1.38
Felecia Collier has known Chester Turner since childhood. But their relationship goes so badly that she eventually tries to kill him. He survives, and it is not until years after that incident that Felecia discovers that Chester murdered several other women. He received the death penalty, but has yet to be executed.
43	7	"Is This the Night I Die?"	February 17, 2019	1.37
Cindy Best is convinced the death of Karl Karlsen's son, Levi in Varick, New York was not an accident. Unfortunately, she has yet to gather evidence to support her claim. Note: This episode re-aired on September 22, 2024, under the alternate title, "I Risked My Life".
44	8	"I Hate Being Daddy's Girl"	February 24, 2019	1.31
Robin Lindsey believes her father truly cares about her. Unbeknownst to her, William Darrell Lindsey is the true family villain.
45	9	"I Wish I'd Turned Around"	March 10, 2019	1.10
Kat Harris and Marla Kreuger each loved Lawrence Harris in her own way. Each dismissed his dark obsession as childish and strange, but harmless. Neither of them realized he was preparing to sacrifice innocent lives for his evil purpose.
46	10	"One Of His Women"	March 24, 2019	1.24
To the outside world, Aswad Ayinde was a hit music video director. But to his daughter, Aziza Kibibi, he was a repulsive monster who did horrifying things in God's name. After years of suffering, she finally escaped to reveal the truth about him.
47	11	"Poisoned By Love"	March 31, 2019	1.15
Norma Hawkins grew up in fear of her mother, Shirley Allen. For years, Norma watched in horror while Shirley's anger destroyed those closest to her. But when people started dying, Norma had to find the courage to turn her own mother in to the police.
48	12	"He Was A Good Man To Me"	April 7, 2019	1.34
When Alvin "Bud" Brown was arrested, he told an officer that he was just like Hannibal Lecter. But to his wife, Jackie, the man she shared a bed with for years appeared to be gentle and loving, until the Thanksgiving Day when she discovered the truth.

=== Season 6 (2019) ===
No. overall	No. in season	Title	Original release date
49	1	"I Tried to Prevent This"	July 14, 2019
For 17 years, Kathy Swanson feared her son, Michael, would one day harm someone. She tried in vain to convince people that something about Michael was different until that dreadful day finally came when her worst nightmare came true.
50	2	"The Face of My Torturer"	July 21, 2019
William Knorr's mother, Theresa Knorr, always threatened that if she ever went to jail for what she had done, she would take him down, too. After years spent helping her keep the horrors secret, could he ever escape or would he wind up like all the others?
51	3	"Our Secret Identity"	July 28, 2019
As a child, Pam Jacobs spent years of her life on the run from the law. But she had no idea that her father, Charles T. Sinclair, was a wanted man until the day the FBI caught up with them. Note: This episode re-aired on September 3, 2020, under the title "The Coin Shop Killer".
52	4	"Until We Meet Again"	August 4, 2019
When James Henslee realized that he was the police's prime suspect, he could not believe it. How could James convince them that someone else someone he had once looked up to was the one capable of murder?
53	5	"He Knew What He Was"	August 11, 2019
Ronald and Patty had always seen the signs that their older brother, Bernard Giles, had a darker side, but when Gene finally let loose the monster lurking inside, they could not help but wonder how things had gone so wrong.
54	6	"They Let Him Out"	August 18, 2019
When Clare Bradburn's ex-husband, Ed, suddenly confessed to his crime after 26 years, she thought she finally had justice, and that the nightmare she had been living for decades would end. She never expected that her nightmare would just continue.
55	7	"I Have to Do the Right Thing"	August 25, 2019
Tim Kreider is fully aware that his son, Alec Devon Kreider, is a dangerous criminal who committed a brutal murder. After being torn, he eventually turns his own son in.
56	8	"My Twisted Sister"	September 1, 2019
When Elizabeth Flores was a child, her sister, Louise, tried to shield her from a horrible family secret. But when Louise met David Turpin, that all changed. How did Louise go from running from monsters to becoming one herself?

=== Season 7 (2020) ===
No. overall	No. in season	Title	Original release date	U.S viewers (millions)
57	1	"It Was All Judith"	January 5, 2020	1.05
When Corey Breininger was a child, his stepmother, Judith Hawkey, coerced him into doing something horrible. Tormented by guilt, he kept her secret for years. Knowing what she was capable of, how could he ever tell the truth and hope to survive?
58	2	"I Raised a Sociopath"	January 12, 2020	1.02
On the day Robert Foust contemplated killing his son, Aaron, he saw it as the only way to prevent him from becoming a murderer. But instead, Robert chose to put himself and his son in God's hands. And God's plan would make him question everything.
59	3	"The Nights I Don't Remember"	January 19, 2020	1.00
Joylynn Martinez discovers that her own husband, Robert Howard Bruce, is the infamous "Ether Man," who used chloroform to rape several girls and even her.
60	4	"My Brother Made History"	January 26, 2020	1.16
Travis Spencer always looked up to his big brother, Timothy Wilson Spencer, unaware that Tim would grow up to be the Southside Strangler, one of the most notorious serial killers of all time.
61	5	"While I Was Gone"	January 29, 2020	1.11
Michele Ward was always glad that her husband, Richard Daniel Starrett, didn't mind her frequent trips to visit her parents. She never guessed that he sent her away because his sick perversion was getting harder and harder to hide.
62	6	"I Wished My Son Were Dead"	February 9, 2020	0.98
It has been more than 25 years, yet Joyce Alexander is still terrified of her son, William Patrick Alexander. She fears he holds her responsible for his horrifying crime, and is convinced he is plotting his revenge from prison.
63	7	"You Have to Get Out"	February 16, 2020	1.00
Edward Pehowic harbored dark secrets before he married Robin Healey, and she would catch only glimpses of her husband's dark side. But it wasn't until after she finally escaped from him once and for all that she realized just how evil he was.
64	8	"I Should Have Killed Him Myself"	February 23, 2020	1.17
John Duck spent his life fearing the day his brother, Kevin, would finally kill someone. When he discovered his brother was actually a murderer, he still was not ready to face the truth he had always known: that his brother had been born a killer.
65	9	"He Almost Got Away With It"	March 1, 2020	1.01
Timothy Bass had gotten away with murder for decades, telling his wife, Gina, that he enjoyed working the night shift to make extra money. For years, Gina believed him until she uncovered his secret and was left wondering what evil her husband had done.
66	10	"He Said There Were More of Them"	March 8, 2020	1.07
It never occurred to Shirley Gaskins that her adored father Donald Gaskins could be a serial killer, but the more people vanished without explanation, the harder it was to deny.
67	11	"He Won't Tell Us Why"	March 15, 2020	0.89
Richard and Ryan Girgis knew their father, Magdi Girgis, was a cheapskate, prone to violence, and not a particularly good father. But when their family was torn apart, neither wanted to admit deep down that they knew who was behind it.
68	12	"The Werewolf Butcher"	March 22, 2020	0.93
When Jack Owen Spillman started collecting wolf memorabilia, his sisters thought it was just an odd hobby. But when they learned of the horrific things he had done, they realized people may have been right when they called him "more animal than human".

=== Season 8 (2020) ===
No. overall	No. in season	Title	Original release date	U.S. viewers (millions)
69	1	"I Killed Dirty John"	August 23, 2020	0.94
Debra and Terra Newell tell the story of their life with Dirty John Meehan, which ends with Terra stabbing him in self-defense.
70	2	"I Didn't Know It Was Blood"	August 30, 2020	0.96
Christina Hildreth had no idea Shawn Grate had committed murder when she cleaned up the crime scene without even realizing it.
71	3	"I Don't Believe in Forgiveness"	September 6, 2020	0.83
Teri Knight spent weeks driving cross-country, desperately searching for the secret her ex-husband, Manuel Gehring, took to his grave. It took years before a stranger finally solved the mystery that haunted her ever since learning he died in prison.
72	4	"Momma Made Me Help"	September 13, 2020	N/A
When Shirley Furgala helped her mother, Betty Lou Beets, drag a dead body to the yard and bury it, she knew her own life might be in danger if she refused to help. What Shirley did not know was this would not be the last time her mother would ask for help.
73	5	"The Prom Night Killer"	October 4, 2020	N/A
Jessi Toronjo went to a sleepover in 1989 thinking her stepbrother, Jeffrey Pelley, was at his senior prom. She spent the next 13 years believing someone else committed the unspeakable crime of that weekend, only to discover she knew the killer all along.
74	6	"My Son Broke My Heart"	October 18, 2020	N/A
Bass Webb murdered 2 girlfriends and gets away with it for years. He is caught after being sentenced to jail for spitting on a judge and attempting to run over 2 jail employees the same day he decapitated his second victim although she would not be found for several years.
75	7	"They Found Them in Storage"	October 25, 2020	N/A
When Wilda Gadd married with Howard Willis, she dismissed the rumors about him. Not until she found herself wearing a wire and risking her life to find dismembered bodies did she finally realize the truth: Howard's secret life was darker than any rumor.

=== Season 9 (2021) ===
No. overall	No. in season	Title	Original release date
76	1	"What If He Were Innocent"	February 13, 2021
Some say Cameron Todd Willingham was wrongfully convicted, and the court put an innocent man to death. But Stacy Kuykendall knew Todd better than anyone, and she's convinced that he was a monster who was guilty as charged and deserved to die.
77	2	"My Son is Damaged Goods"	April 3, 2021
Jeanne Avsenew and her young son Peter were close, but as Peter matured, his obsession with death grew. The day Jeanne finds a bullet with her name scrawled on it, she realizes her son wants her dead, and Jeanne must take drastic measures to keep safe.
78	3	"I Don't Know Why He Spared Me"	April 10, 2021
Thirty years on, Sharon Morris still wonders why former boyfriend Tony Fiebiger didn't kill her when he had the chance. There was a time when she felt only love for Tony, but as his sick crimes are revealed, she's grateful she's alive to talk about it.
79	4	"He Pretends to Be Human"	April 17, 2021
When Kelly Pletcher heard what her ex-husband Wayne Adam Ford carried in his pocket while surrendering to police, she was horrified and disgusted – but not surprised. The real surprise was that she managed to escape before becoming one of his victims.
80	5	"They Said I Killed My Brother"	April 24, 2021
Eric Nance expects his sister Belinda to find and destroy his murder weapon to protect him. When she finally locates it, Belinda is torn between family loyalty and doing what she knows is right. Her choice will either shield him from police or betray him.
81	6	"The Box On Her Doorstep"	May 1, 2021
Each time she was targeted by an anonymous predator, Sarah Garone ran to her stepfather, Gary Hardy. She always felt something about Gary was creepy, but as the events got more disturbing, she never imagined someone trusted could be the one to hurt her.
82	7	"He Lived a Double Life"	May 8, 2021
Sonja Holt begins to suspect that her fiance, Stafford Shaw, is living a secret double life. She can't imagine just how far he will go to keep everyone from finding out the truth about him or the terrible price that will be paid when his secrets collide.
83	8	"To Infinity and Back"	May 15, 2021
When Claire Throssell meets Darren Sykes, she thinks her future husband's overwhelming displays of affection are signs of love. She fails to see that Darren is out to control her, and if he doesn't get his way, the revenge he takes will be terrible.

=== Season 10 (2021) ===
No. overall	No. in season	Title	Original release date
84	1	"My Son Should Die In Prison"	July 11, 2021
Dylan Eason is serving a life-sentence without parole for murdering his stepmother in 2016. His father, Jon Eason, feels as horrible as it is to wish death on his son, he hopes every day that someone will murder him in prison for the harm he caused to innocent people and their loved ones.
85	2	"He Got Into My Soul"	July 18, 2021
When Christian Fuhr is sentenced to life in prison, Ammie Turos is willing to wait for him, completely convinced the man she loves could not possibly have also been a killer. She remains faithful to him for years, determined to somehow prove his innocence and that he has been wrongly convicted. Then she discovers that the accusations against him are all true, and her conviction is replaced by uncertainty whether her life had also been in danger all along, or if she had just been one woman in Christian's life whom he had not wanted to kill.
86	3	"Why Did I Let Him In?"	August 1, 2021
Teshana Singleton initially thinks her first boyfriend Cedric Ricks's obsession with her is flattering, but when his obsession turns evil, she begins to realize she's in danger. Cedric believes that if he cannot have Teshana, no one can.
87	4	"He Got Away With Murder"	August 8, 2021
When police arrest Mel Ignatow for murder, his son Mike is sure he is innocent and that his dad's girlfriend is to blame instead. Melvin is acquitted but later confesses to the crime, and Mike must face the fact that his father has gotten away with murder.
88	5	"My Sister Blamed Me"	August 15, 2021
As children, Cindy Blust loved her younger sister, Camellia Brown, deeply, but she also saw cruelty and darkness in her that she couldn't ignore. As they got older, Cammy became increasingly angry, vengeful, and obsessive, blaming Cindy for all her problems, including the horrible crime she committed. Cindy is certain that her sister still blames her for her incarceration and wants revenge.
89	6	"He Was My Hero And My Monster"	August 22, 2021
As a child, Daniel Rolle idolizes his father, Donald, and thinks his family is happy, but when things start to go wrong, he begins to realize that his father's growing rage and unrelenting cruelty are causing everyone to suffer. After a childhood spent wrestling with the conflicting emotions of both loving and fearing his own father, when Donald's rage ultimately leads to murder, Daniel finds himself with his father's life in his own hands.
90	7	"I Want To Watch His Last Breath"	August 29, 2021
Cathy Mills is only a teenager when her fairytale marriage to Robert Lee Walden turns into a nightmare. Still, it is not until she sees a police sketch of her husband that she realizes only she knows the true identity of the monster authorities are hunting.
91	8	"I Still Love My Daddy"	September 12, 2021
When Deborah Brashers' father, Robert Eugene Brashers, returns from prison and reconnects with her, she instantly becomes a daddy's girl. But when he suddenly disappears again, Deborah is told that he is on the run from the police because of a petty crime. This chase ends in a fatal standoff with police, and Deborah learns the chilling truth about her father's secret double life.
92	9	"I Was Warned And Didn't Listen"	September 19, 2021
Jennifer Winter accepts Cristobal Palacio's marriage proposal out of necessity. She believes that he understands that theirs is a marriage of convenience, not love. Then he makes her his prisoner, and she realizes escape will come at a terrible cost.
93	10	"He Was Born Evil"	September 26, 2021
Every time Cheri Tate calls the police on her husband Edward Allen Covington, they believe him over her. Then she leaves him, and he takes his revenge – but on others. She realizes in horror that he has done to them what he always wanted to do to her.
94	11	"Nobody Believed Me"	October 3, 2021
When Matt Roth is just a boy, his stepfather brings him along on handyman jobs; he thinks he is just there to help his dad, but he doesn't realize he is walking into the scenes of brutal murders.
95	12	"We All Die Tonight"	October 10, 2021
Christina Gaines goes on a date with Patrick Fowler, a supposed "perfect gentleman". She soon discovers Patrick's true nature and realizes she's been duped. Now that Christina is in his grasp, she must find a way to avoid becoming his next victim.
96	13	"He Fed Them to Gators"	October 17, 2021
Craig Lester Thrift brags about getting away with murder, but everyone thinks he is kidding. Robyn Barry knows Thrift better than anyone, and she begins to suspect he isn't joking. Someone needs to believe her before Thrift makes her his next victim.

=== Season 11 (2022) ===
No. overall	No. in season	Title	Original release date
97	1	"Locked In A Closet"	February 20, 2022
The first time Alice Jenkins locks Jesse Eging in the closet as a child, he thinks it's only a game. But as Jesse's captivity grows longer and food becomes scarce, he realizes that if he and his siblings do not find a way to escape, they will surely die.
98	2	"What If He Got Out?"	February 27, 2022
When Amy Chessler calls 911 to report what her brother, Jesse Winnick, has confessed to, she doesn't know whether to believe him. Jesse's always been a liar, and Amy doesn't truly understand what he is capable of until she walks in and sees it for herself.
99	3	"I Will Always Be Scared Of Him"	March 6, 2022
When Deborah Williamson meets her stepson, David Shafer, she knows there is something unsettling about him. When her warnings about his frightening behavior go unheeded, the devastation he ultimately wreaks is beyond anything she could have imagined.
100	4	"He Kept Her In A Tree Stump"	March 13, 2022
After Ernest Christie dies, his son, Sam, calls police and tells them everything he witnessed as a child, including murder. He is finally rid of the secrets he carried for decades, but now may pay a price for helping his father get away with it all.
101	5	"He Was A False Prophet"	March 20, 2022
As a child, Benjamin Risha believes Tony Alamo when he preaches he is a prophet of God. Although, as Benjamin gets older and realizes that the prophet is a liar, he fears for his life because he sees what happens to others who doubt Tony.
102	6	"Keeping My Brother's Secret"	March 27, 2022
Steven Crittenden shares a confession with his brother, Bryant Jones. He swears him to secrecy in Chico, California. Bryant faces the toughest decision of his life – whether to keep the secret and risk letting a murderer get away with it, or tell the truth and betray his family.
103	7	"She Should Be Left To Die"	April 3, 2022
Police inform Chris Matechen of what his girlfriend, Alyssa Dayvault, has confessed to. He doesn't want to believe it because that would mean admitting that he has ultimately fallen for her lies and spent years blind to the horrific things she had done right under his nose.
104	8	"Divorce? Never. Murder? Maybe."	April 10, 2022
Vernon Jensen is so afraid of his wife Vicki and her violent temper that he decides to divorce her. It isn't until he finally leaves that he discovers just how far she'll go to get revenge. Note: The story of this episode is continued on Evil Lives Here: Shadows of Death in the Season 3 premiere episode "They Killed My Mom" in which the daughter of one of Vicki's victims, Jade Scotton, speak out on what happened to her mother and confronting Verne on her mother's death over two decades later, feeling he shared responsibility.

=== Season 12 (2022) ===
No. overall	No. in season	Title	Original release date
105	1	"He Should Have Died Sooner"	July 4, 2022
When George Yzaguirre kills himself in prison, he takes his secrets with him, and his ex-wife, Jennifer Meyer, is left to wonder how many of her memories might hold the keys to unsolved crimes and whether or not she'll ever know the truth about him.
106	2	"He Tied Me Up, Too"	July 11, 2022
When Linda Bergstrom begins to suspect that her husband James's bondage fetish shifted into something sinister, she can't get anyone to believe her; the more she learns about his behaviour, the more she becomes determined to stop her husband.
107	3	"Sleeping With the Enemy"	July 18, 2022
When Sarita Anderson begins feeling ill, she thinks it's just the flu at first; she never suspects that Karim Zakikhani, the man pretending to love and nurse her back to health is actually the monster responsible.
108	4	"A Special Place in Hell"	July 25, 2022
Faith Green thinks she knows everything about Gregory Green's past when reconnecting with him at her father's church. Raised to believe in forgiveness, she gives him a second chance, but his secrets will lead to an unspeakable tragedy.
109	5	"He Pretended To Save Me"	August 1, 2022
When Rodney Metzer shows up to rescue his wife, Morgan, from a horrifying, violent encounter, it appears he is there to save her, but Morgan soon suspects he is no hero and instead may be going to disturbing lengths to prevent her from ever leaving him.
110	6	"I Found His Confession"	August 8, 2022
When police arrest Adam Pennylegion's stepbrother, Dustin Duthie, some people blame steroids, but Adam has noticed Dustin heading down a dark path for years.

=== Season 13 (2023) ===
No. overall	No. in season	Title	Original release date
111	1	"I Watched Daddy Bury Mommy"	January 23, 2023
As a child, Lori Hodge doesn't understand what she sees when her father, Gene Keidel, digs a hole in the yard in the middle of the night, but as she gets older and realizes the truth, she becomes a threat, and he will stop at nothing to keep his secret.
112	2	"I Made It Out Alive"	January 30, 2023
For years, every time Gabi Blair walks past the freezer, she shudders at the thought of the horrors hidden inside. Forced to keep secret her mother's crimes, she prays that someone will discover the truth before she becomes her mother's next victim.
113	3	"Scratch My Murderous Itch"	February 6, 2023
Eugene Borg knows that Satan has evil plans for his young son, Tyler, and spends the subsequent years battling the demons he believes plague his child until a shock comes that proves that he may have forever lost the war for his son's soul.
114	4	"Kill Him, Save Yourself"	February 20, 2023
David Magnano and his stepsister, Jessica, know that Scott Magnano is dangerous. They know they would be safer if he were gone, and they know he deserves to die. What David doesn't know is how much he will regret not killing Scott when he has the chance.
115	5	"He Called It "The Need”"	February 27, 2023
When Dianne Burns moves across the country to marry Mark Burns in prison, she has no doubt her soon-to-be husband has been wrongfully accused until after his release when she begins to see signs that he is not only guilty but only just getting started.
116	6	"He Looks Like the Killer on TV"	March 6, 2023
Margie Bult thinks her second husband is too good to be true from the start, but when a friend tells her to turn on the TV and she sees a fugitive named Paul Steven Mack who resembles him, she vows to uncover the truth no matter the risk to herself.
117	7	"Fantasizing and Hunting"	March 13, 2023
When Michael O’Leary moves in with his brother he doesn't realize that Marc has already fled the police in one state and committed crimes in another until police finally track them down, and suspect Michael of being his accomplice.
118	8	"The Hole in the Backyard"	March 20, 2023
When a hole appears in the backyard, Delila Yang gets suspicious. She knows her mother, Karina, dug it and knows someone is missing, but Delila doesn't yet realize she must work with police to trap her mom and unearth her sinister secrets.
119	9	"Ménage à Terror"	April 3, 2023
Genie already knows Lee Cawthon is capable of horrible things when he forces her into a polygamous relationship. She plays along with his twisted demands but doesn't realize that the consequences of letting him have his way might be worse.
120	10	"Sisters in Silence"	April 10, 2023
William Cosden Jr. coerced his much younger sisters, Karen and Susan, into keeping secrets about what he did. Now the girls are adults, and with one facing death, they reunite one final time to try to repair the trauma keeping those secrets caused them.

=== Season 14 (2023) ===
No. overall	No. in season	Title	Original release date
121	1	"We’re Glad Mom is Dead"	August 6, 2023
Victoria and Christine Lisowski live in fear of their mother, Sungnam Kwon-Lisowski. They never imagine that this Christmas, they'll feel lucky to survive the holiday and their mother's crazed vengeance.
122	2	"Trapped in a House of Torture"	August 13, 2023
Tammy Moore's loyalty to her mother, Marie, is absolute. When police arrest Marie for murder, Tammy even lies to protect her. But a look back at the horrific events of her youth forces Tammy to see her mother in a new and terrifying light.
123	3	"My Brother Let the Evil In"	August 20, 2023
Christina Thomas believes her brother, John White, the first time he nearly kills a woman. She forgives him when he murders another. But when it happens again, she wonders why she trusted him and how she missed the signs he was really devil in disguise.
124	4	"Murder at Sea"	August 27, 2023
When young Vince Boston finds himself an unwitting accomplice to a horrific crime, he realizes his father, Silas Boston, has been killing for years. He embarks on a mission to get justice for his father's many victims, which may include Vince's mother.
125	5	"He Had a Torture Chamber"	September 3, 2023
When Terry Patzer hears what police discovered at Russell Tillis's house of horrors, memories of the nine years she spent married to him flood back. She can't explain how her former love became so twisted, but she was right to be afraid of him all along.
126	6	"She Knew It Was Goodbye"	September 10, 2023
Ginger knows her sister Paige is trouble. She feels entitled to her family's undivided attention, and when she doesn't get it, she becomes a monster. Over time, Ginger watches as Paige abuses and ultimately murders the one person she cares for the most.
127	7	"I Wanted My Father to Die"	September 17, 2023
Teresa Holman spends much of her childhood wishing her father, Freddie Bowen, would die for the things he does to his family, but when presented with a chance to get her wish, the choice she makes will have unforeseen consequences and lead to tragedy.
128	8	"Three-and-A-half Hours of Hell"	September 24, 2023
Sara Pitcher thinks Shawn Spink is a man of God, but she'll soon endure three-and-a-half hours of pure terror to save herself from the darkness within him. Police believe Sara's survival is a miracle – even so, her life will never be the same.

=== Season 15 (2024) ===
No. overall	No. in season	Title	Original release date
129	1	"Butcher and the Box"	February 18, 2024
Lori and Brook, tortured by the same sadistic man, meet for the first time. Note: This is the first ever two-hour episode, though not a special and part of the episode count.
130	2	"Terror in the Wilderness"	February 25, 2024
After decades of hell, Elishaba escapes her father Robert Allen Hale through the wilderness.
131	3	"She Hid the Knife in a Toybox"	March 3, 2024
When Jason files for divorce, Brandi takes his most precious treasures.
132	4	"He Brought Roses and a Gun"	March 10, 2024
When Andrea Bell reveals she's pregnant, Ray Clark start to stalk her and torture their infant son in Milwaukee. Andrea and her baby narrowly escape, but the next woman Ray meets isn't so lucky.
133	5	"Murder in The House of Prayer"	March 24, 2024
As a child, Joy believes her mother, Anna Young, is the voice of God. In their isolated church community, Anna punishes anyone who breaks her rules – even young children aren't spared. Years later, Joy realizes her mother is not an angel, she's a killer.
134	6	"I Saw Myself on Tape"	March 31, 2024
Tonja Balden doesn't know Andrew Luster whom she meets at the bar hides a twisted secret. When they date, she doesn't know he's videotaping his heinous crimes until a major news story unveils his long, dark history.
135	7	"He Shot Through My Heart"	April 7, 2024
When LaTonya leaves her violent husband, he plots a vicious revenge.
136	8	"He Used a Chainsaw"	April 14, 2024
At first, Ainjil Reyes thought William Keck was charming, but his dark and violent tendencies emerged. When Ainjil finally got away from him and started a new life in Las Vegas with a man she truly loved, he exacted brutal revenge.
137	9	"He Asked Me To Be His Hitman"	April 21, 2024
When Roger's best friend, Bob Duke, asks for a "favor," he thinks Bob is venting. When he asks again, Roger worries for Bob's wife and son. Then, an "accident" occurs, and Roger knows his friend is a killer. Now, he must stop Bob before he strikes again.
138	10	"She Called To Say "I Killed Them""	April 28, 2024
Ron Youngblood's dream of having a family hits a nightmarish snag when he meets Veronica, a cold, cruel, and unfaithful woman. When Ron tries to leave, she destroys everything he cherishes most.

=== Season 16 (2024) ===
No. overall	No. in season	Title	Original release date
139	1	"He Saved Her Life, Then Took It"	August 25, 2024
Betty hopes her sister's son, Chance, is a beacon of hope in their troubled lives, but Betty sees his dark side early on. He lacks empathy and becomes violent until he explodes in a fit of rage, harming the one person who cared for him most in the world.
140	2	"Our Little Sister, the Monster"	September 1, 2024
Heather, her younger sister, has been terrorizing David and Crystal since she was a child. They hope she will improve after becoming a mother, but she only becomes worse. After meeting Kareem, she transforms into a monster.
141	3	"They Stole My Childhood"	September 8, 2024
Abby's life takes a dark turn when she realizes she's living with predators – her aunt and uncle. What she initially hoped would be a blessing turns into a nightmare and escaping their clutches will take every ounce of her courage.
142	4	"Ted Bundy Was His Idol"	September 15, 2024
Debra sees darkness in her young brother's eyes, but hopes he'll change. However, when Cesar Barone becomes a notorious serial killer, she realizes her brother is a monster.
143	5	"My Wicked Stepmother"	September 29, 2024
After her father, Donald Hoop, meets a woman named Joy, Desiree's life spirals. Joy is hot-tempered, cruel, and controlling. Desiree knows her dad can't escape his toxic marriage, but she has no clue that Joy is orchestrating a cold-blooded murder.
144	6	"I Knew My Brother Was a Killer"	October 7, 2024
Maya Burgess always knew her brother, Stevie, was trouble. After he holds a butcher's knife to her brother's throat and threatens to shoot her at her wedding, she knows he's dangerous. However, it took a tragedy to realize that he's also a killer.
145	7	"Greed, Jealousy, Malice"	October 13, 2024
Sara always gets her father's back. She believes him every time he justifies his shifty schemes. However, when she learns of her mother's murder, she slowly begins to realize who her father truly is, unearthing her family's dirty secrets along the way.
146	8	"A Demon on Her Back"	October 20, 2024
Kayla always knew to be careful around her stepfather, Richard. He imprisoned her mother with the fear of violence and, worse, the fear of taking her children from her. When she finally managed to escape his grip, he plotted a final and brutal revenge.

=== Season 17 (2025) ===
No. overall	No. in season	Title	Original release date
147	1	"Not My Brother’s Keeper"	February 16, 2025
Renee Brunk fears her little brother's cruel taunts until she fights back, never suspecting he would plot revenge on his family.
148	2	"My First Love Hunted People"	February 23, 2025
When Christina meets Loren Herzog, she's young, looking for love and an escape from a chaotic home. Then she discovers he is a serial killer.
149	3	"My Father Let the Darkness In"	March 2, 2025
Lisa knows her father Wayne Conner is cruel and can't understand why her mom stays with him, but she has no idea how evil he truly is.
150	4	"Mom Lured Me Into a Trap"	March 9, 2025
Kristyn Galey's mother, Melissa, is angry and jealous and violent, leading to unthinkable and brutal murders in Hot Springs, Arkansas.
151	5	"I Died for a Moment"	March 16, 2025
Desiray Liner finds herself trapped in a living hell and must fight like hell to survive after she tries to leave her partner Raymond Cervantes.
152	6	"Three Times a Killer"	March 23, 2025
When Randy Gay reveals his violent past, Debra must make a daring escape, but the next woman isn't so lucky.
153	7	"He Took My Soul"	March 30, 2025
When Courtney Tomlinson's jealous boyfriend moves in to her Troy, Illinois home he promptly directs his rage on the person she loves most.
154	8	"He Haunts Me Everyday"	April 6, 2025
Abigail Winters was always a helper. So when she sees her boyfriend's darkness, she tries to help but cannot.
155	9	"Thirty Years In Hell"	April 13, 2025
At 16, Roxie Durrah rushes into marriage that would drag her into hell. After 30 years, Roxie finally leaves, but she pays a terrible price.
156	10	"He Was Whistling as He Did It"	April 20, 2025
Melanie Robey had worked so hard to make her relationship with her husband work, despite his lies and abuse. Then he tried to brutally murder her in their Sevierville, Tennessee home.

=== Season 18 (2025) ===
No. overall	No. in season	Title	Original release date
157	1	"I know Who the Real Monster Is"	July 13, 2025
Ryan Read learns his fun-loving stepfather is a cruel, sadistic predator.
158	2	"My Love Put a Gun to My Head"	July 20, 2025
Dreamer escapes Teddy`s grip, but he makes her family pay a terrible price.
159	3	"Mom Said I Was Dying"	July 27, 2025
As a child, Hannah thinks she`s dying, then learns her mom betrayed her.
160	4	"Trapped Abroad"	August 3, 2025
Eline fights to survive a brutal attack by her ex as her child watches.
161	5	"Blood on My Brother`s Hands"	August 10, 2025
Patrick Bruce endures life in a house with his violent, twisted brother.
162	6	"Why Is Daddy on TV?"	August 24, 2025
When Letisha learns her ex is a killer, she realizes she escaped a monster.
163	7	"It Was Like Watching a Demon"	August 31, 2025
Sisters try to protect their mother from the terror of her live-in partner.
164	8	"Our Brother by Blood"	September 7, 2025
Tabitha and Ann`s mother is a giver, but their brother Terry...a taker.
165	9	"Mother`s Day Malice"	September 14, 2025
Deon`s stepfather plots to kill his family when he loses control over them.
166	10	"Like a Monster From the Movies"	September 21, 2025
Wife. Girlfriend. Sister. No one is safe from Patrick Boggs – or the fire within.

=== Season 19 (2026) ===
No. overall	No. in season	Title	Original release date
167	1	"Fostering Evil"	January 14, 2026
Foster child Sabrina Zunich murders her guardian as part of a twisted plot.
168	2	"I Am Not My Father"	January 21, 2026
A son learns that his father Danny Bible is a cold-blooded serial killer in hiding.
169	3	"He`ll Kill Me Next"	January 28, 2026
Domeneka fears her boyfriend`s wrath as he turns his sights on her.
170	4	"One Hundred Percent a Monster"	February 4, 2026
Trina Vito is terrorized by her manipulative and controlling stepfather.
171	5	"They All Saw His Evil"	February 18, 2026
A divorce starts a new relationship with a killer in hiding.
172	6	"Black Widow of Pennsylvania"	February 25, 2026
Rebecca suspects that her mother Myrle Miller is a black widow in disguise.
173	7	"The Granny Killer"	March 4, 2026
Nora escapes her abusive husband Edwin Kaprat just in time.
174	8	"I Still Hear Their Screams"	March 11, 2026
When Felisha leaves a cold and selfish man, he exacts the cruelest revenge.
175	9	"He Put Me in the Dog Cage"	March 18, 2026
Christy Foe reconnects with an old crush but soon must fight for her life.
176	10	"Badge of Evil"	March 25, 2026
A stepson sees the truth: his mom`s beloved deputy David Keith Rogers hides unimaginable evil.

=== Evil Lives Here: After the Evil ===
The 6–7-minute extras were released with interviews of people who told their heart-stopping stories on the program after some time.

No. in season	Title	Original release date
1	"Episode 2.01"	July 23, 2018
A couple shares what happened when they learned their son was an arsonist.
2	"Episode 2.04"	July 23, 2018
A sister fights against her brother's parole after he killed their family.
3	"Episode 2.08"	July 23, 2018
A wife discovers that her husband is a serial killer.
4	"Episode 3.12"	July 23, 2018
A woman discovers that her son has researched his father's past crimes.
5	"Episode 3.02"	January 4, 2019
A woman has nightmares that her husband escaped from prison and found her.
6	"Episode 3.03"	January 4, 2019
A woman helps police determine if her husband was involved in a cold case.
7	"Episode 3.08"	January 4, 2019
A man decides if he is ready to talk about his mass murderer brother.
8	"Episode 4.06"	January 4, 2019
A man and his son endured years of terror from his wife before her arrest.

== Evil Lives Here: Shadows of Death ==
Evil Lives Here: Shadows of Death
- Genre: Documentary
- Directed by: J. Tom Pougue; Joe Pincosy; Phoebe Kwong; Justin Lee Stanley; Bryan C. Marsh; Colin Herlihy
- Theme music composer: John Congleton
- Composer: John Congleton
- Country of origin: United States
- No. of seasons: 6
- No. of episodes: 38

Production
- Running time: 42 minutes
- Production company: Red Marble Media

Original release
- Network: Investigation Discovery
- Release: October 29, 2020 – February 4, 2024

A spinoff series titled Evil Lives Here: Shadows of Death debuted on October 29, 2020.

As of 2021, the actors of the show must be vaccinated as a result of the COVID-19 pandemic.

=== Premise ===
Whereas the parent show Evil Lives Here showcases a person being interviewed on a family member who is a murderer and how the situation has affected them, this show features mostly the associates of the victims and law enforcement themselves being interviewed on how they were affected by the culprit's actions or culprits if there was more than one.

Evil casts a shadow. That shadow spreads outward for years, even decades, after a crime. It consumes everyone in its path, pulling them into darkness.

— Onscreen text of the premise during the show's opening sequence

Some episodes do favor the original show's format featuring family member culprits, but the stories are told by two or more people of the family (often joined by a police officer assigned to the case), as opposed to just one person the whole way through which is a main element of the original show for most of the episodes. With Shadows of Death, it is the reversal where solo interview storytelling is rare.

=== Episodes ===
Season	Episodes	Originally released	
Season	Episodes	First released	Last released
1	6	October 29, 2020	December 10, 2020
2	8	June 16, 2021	August 4, 2021
3	6	April 10, 2022	May 15, 2022
4	6	September 4, 2022	October 16, 2022
5	6	April 17, 2023	May 24, 2023
6	6	January 7, 2024	February 4, 2024

=== Season 1 (2020) ===
No. overall	No. in season	Title	Original release date
1	1	"Truth, Lies, and Redemption"	October 29, 2020
In 1988, a man is released from jail after a judge deems his murder confession false. For 25 years, a family's hope for justice fades, as the killer walks the streets of Clearwater, Florida. But one tenacious detective refuses to let this cold case go.
2	2	"The Path"	November 5, 2020
A series of unsolved murders happens in Maryland between 1986 and 1993. Years later a police detective links all cases together, and finally arrest Alexander Wayne Watson.
3	3	"Buried Dreams"	November 12, 2020
In Bethany, Oklahoma, a young pregnant woman disappears one day in 2007. As the police tries to trail her last known whereabouts, they uncover more than just the secrets she's been hiding from everyone close to her.
4	4	"The Ride Along"	November 19, 2020
On 1993 night in Manhattan Beach, California, officer Martin Ganz is shot and killed during a routine traffic stop. The only witness is a young boy who is far too scared to tell the police what he had witnessed that could put his own life in danger.
5	5	"Lost Highway"	December 3, 2020
In 1996, a deceased body of a young mother is found on the side of a highway in a real area of Tulsa, Oklahoma. Believed to be a random hit-and-run accident, the case turns out to be anything but and the grieving family is determined to get answers at all cost. Note: The story of this episode is continued on Evil Lives Here: The Killer Speaks in the Season 2 episode "A Killer`s Words".
6	6	"We Found Bonnie"	December 10, 2020
In 1993, a family is torn apart when a mother in Jacksonville, Florida, goes missing. The case stumps detectives, who believe that the truth about what happened to her is locked inside the mind of the missing woman's three-year-old son.

=== Season 2 (2021) ===
No. overall	No. in season	Title	Original release date
7	1	"The Girl in the Photo"	June 16, 2021
In 1995, a well-respected mother who works at an accounting office is found raped and murdered at her job. Nearby, her daughter is found covered in blood. When police photograph the scene, they get perhaps one of the most surprising moments of their careers. Jack Harold Jones
8	2	"The Bathtub"	June 23, 2021
In South Barrington, Illinois, a rookie cop investigates an apparent accidental drowning case in the year 2000. But after looking at the situation more, the cop sees it's not all that's cracked up to be that even after ten years he continues to have suspicions on. Believing this to be an act of murder, he makes it his duty to get to the ins and outs of this case.
9	3	"I Forgive You"	June 30, 2021
In 2003 in Hamilton, Georgia, Adrian Robinson shoots his father in the head sixteen times. Days later, the body of a nun is found on the side of a road in Norfolk, Virginia. The story behind these two crimes haunts those involved to this day.
10	4	"The Lake House"	July 7, 2021
In Radford, Virginia, 1980, college freshman Gina Hall goes out dancing and is never seen again. An investigation by police leads her whereabouts last being known at a lake house, but nothing much further. A murderer was convicted despite no body being found. At least until forty years later, sparking renewed interest in the case for both police and family members to get the truth on what happened to Gina.
11	5	"Mother-To-Be"	July 14, 2021
In Burlington, North Carolina, a pregnant woman named April Greer disappears one day in 2003 and is nowhere to be detected by family, friends, or law enforcement. Her boyfriend believes she left him, and her worried family tries to get answers. In the end, a haunting truth emerges on April's behalf no one could have expected that leaves everyone close to her in turmoil.
12	6	"The Monster"	July 21, 2021
JT Armstead gains a new stepfather, Gary Green, who married his mother, Lovetta. The family life turns out to be anything but loving when Gary tries to control the family though violent acts. Soon, the violence increases and causes more than what anyone would have bargained for that goes beyond just the family household.
13	7	"Do No Harm"	July 28, 2021
Christopher Duntsch is caught under a heatwave when various patients of his complain about his medical practice that has left them scarred, an act that has lasted over the course of two years. District Attorney Michelle Shugart approaches this case not knowing what could cause a man to do something so horrid, but soon comes to realize there's more to the motive than what meets the eye.
14	8	"Mother's Day Murder"	August 4, 2021
In 2011, Mother's Day looks a little different this year for high school freshman Tony Gana. His mother, Annamaria Gana, is battling stage 2 breast cancer. She says she's fine, but Tony can tell the medicine and the chemo is taking its toll. Officer Todd Hylton is called to the scene of an alleged shooting. Just moments earlier, the caller told dispatch that his mom shot him.

=== Season 3 (2022) ===
No. overall	No. in season	Title	Original release date
15	1	"They Killed My Mom"	April 10, 2022
When a Twin Falls, Idaho woman dies of a suspected drug overdose in 1999, the case seems open and shut until her 3-year-old daughter gives a chilling statement to police. Now, that daughter wants to know why it took the police so long to believe her. Note: This episode is a follow up to the Evil Lives Here episode, "Divorce? Never. Murder? Maybe." from Season 11, involving the associates of murder victim Aleta Diane Ray, giving their accounts of Diane and how the crime affected them. In a rare format scenario, it also showcases a long-waited meeting between Verne Jensen and Diane's daughter Jade Scotton, seen briefly at the end of the Evil Lives Here episode through video feed, whom Verne has not seen in twenty-two years since she was three years old.
16	2	"A Double Life"	April 17, 2022
In Monroe City, Missouri, the body of a Molly Nicole Watson lies dead on a deserted dirt road only days before her wedding. While investigating her death, police uncover surprising secrets in her fiancé's life.
17	3	"The Paper Route"	April 24, 2022
In Binghamton, New York, twelve-year-old Cheri Lindsey disappears while delivering newspapers alone. The investigation leads to a discovery neither her family nor law enforcement anticipated.
18	4	"No Promise For Tomorrow"	May 1, 2022
In Birmingham, Alabama, a landlord approaches his rental home to inspect a broken window when he suddenly hears a crying baby. What he discovers inside will haunt two families for the rest of their lives. The baby is discovered alone with his mother, Candace Brown, missing. After her body is discovered in the mountains, the case leads to the killer being Michael Jeffrey Land.
19	5	"The Only Witness"	May 8, 2022
After a savage beating that nearly kills Judy Chandler, she learns her attacker also murdered her two children. Investigators launch a relentless search for the killer and quickly realize their most crucial clue might die with their victim.
20	6	"The Lookout"	May 15, 2022
Jennifer Griner and Mary Orlando are shot to death at Lehigh Lookout in Bethlehem, Pennsylvania, by a gunman who refuses to explain why he committed the double homicide.

=== Season 4 (2022) ===
No. overall	No. in season	Title	Original release date
21	1	"No Body"	September 4, 2022
In 2005, a woman fails to show up at a Mötley Crüe concert and is never seen again. To this day, her friends and family wait for her killer to visit her secret grave.
22	2	"The Dark Road"	September 11, 2022
In 1996, a Powell, Wyoming college student leaves a dorm party and gets a ride from the wrong classmate, vanishing into the night; police scramble to find her.
23	3	"What He Took Away"	September 18, 2022
In 2016, a prosecutor must make an attempt to untangle the facts from fiction when the perpetrator of a brutal shooting in Mesa, Arizona claims that there is no randomness to his murders.
24	4	"360 Degrees Of Terror"	October 2, 2022
In 2017, Jordan Hazel becomes the prime suspect in the brutal triple murder of his wife Keara, son Kayden, and daughter Jaylynn.
25	5	"Devil In Disguise"	October 9, 2022
Lisa Reeves is the sole survivor when abusive estranged husband Randy Gwathney targets her and three members of her family in Arkansas.
26	6	"Free To Kill Again"	October 16, 2022
When 33-year-old Erika Verdecia goes missing in Davie, Florida the family launches their own search for her.

=== Season 5 (2023) ===
No. overall	No. in season	Title	Original release date
27	1	"In Mother's Garden"	April 17, 2023
In 2004, the cat-and-mouse hunt for serial killer Larry Bright who targets black females antagonizes investigators in Peoria, Illinois.
28	2	"The Wicked Pair"	April 25, 2023
When five people vanish in 1993, cops have zero leads; seven years later, someone connected to the case starts to talk.
29	3	"The Evil Twin"	May 2, 2023
In 1995, 14-year-old Kristy Lynn Ohnstad goes missing from her neighborhood of Bellingham, Washington.
30	4	"Killing of Two Spirits"	May 10, 2023
In 2001, the violent murder of a Navajo teenager horrifies the community of Cortez, Colorado.
31	5	"City of Angels"	May 17, 2023
For six months in 2014, serial killer Alexander Hernandez preys upon innocent victims in Los Angeles.
32	6	"Satan Walking"	May 24, 2023
In 1995, a desperate mother in Conroe, Texas, learns the hard way that sometimes Satan takes the form of a family friend.

=== Season 6 (2024) ===
No. overall	No. in season	Title	Original release date
33	1	"The Night He Turned Bad"	January 7, 2024
In 1974, after a Valentine's dance, 17-year-old Carla Walker is kidnapped by a man with a gun. For 45 years the case goes unsolved, and no one has any idea that the person responsible is living uncomfortably close, hiding in plain sight.
34	2	"A Deal With the Devil"	January 14, 2024
In 2016, beloved young mother Tricia Todd vanishes from Hobe Sound, Florida. Her family desperate for answers makes a deal with the devil to locate her.
35	3	"Who Killed Kay?"	January 21, 2024
In 2008, a real estate developer, Hal Wenal finds his wife, Kay Wenal murdered in their Lawrenceville, Georgia home. With few clues the case quickly turns cold. The murder is still unsolved.
36	4	"Garden of Horrors"	January 28, 2024
In 2019, beloved father James Pannoni vanishes from Hubert, North Carolina. His home appears spotless, but there's something odd about the flower garden.
37	5	"Negotiating With a Killer"	February 4, 2024
After Jamie Hood murders a cop and injures another one in Athens, Georgia, a massive manhunt is underway. He has hostages, and police fear he wants to go down in a blaze of glory.
38	6	"The Bad Boys"	February 4, 2024
In 1992, when Jenn Drury learns about her father's – Harold Drury – cold-blooded murder, her first thought is that the cult has something to do with it.

== Evil Lives Here: The Killer Speaks ==
A spinoff sequel series titled Evil Lives Here: The Killer Speaks debuted on October 1, 2023.

=== Episodes ===
Season	Episodes	Originally released	
Season	Episodes	First released	Last released
1	6	October 1, 2023	November 5, 2023
2	10	April 28, 2025	July 7, 2025

=== Season 1 (2023) ===
No. overall	No. in season	Title	Original release date
1	1	"Body in the Barrel"	October 1, 2023
A father must answer to his daughter about her mother's murder.
2	2	"He Said He'd Kill Us All"	October 8, 2023
Elisabeth and Frank reconnect after years apart, and Elisabeth's mother, Cheri, watches as their toxic relationship blows up, resulting in a devastating fire. When the smoke clears, one lies dead, and the other sits behind bars. Now, Cheri wants answers.
3	3	"Can You Believe a Killer?"	October 15, 2023
Robert Shafer and David Steinmyer each tell their own versions of how two men were killed by them in 1990.
4	4	"The Kansas City Strangler"	October 22, 2023
Lemuel Kimes is shocked to find out that his best friend Lorenzo Gilyard is the Kansas City Strangler, a serial killer who murdered a dozen women between the ages of 17 and 36 years old from 1977 to 1993.
5	5	"The Writing on the Wall"	October 29, 2023
Joel White's sister, Amy Poole, and ex-girlfriend Melanie Hayes describe his brutal behavior, which culminated in the murder of his new girlfriend's husband, Roderick. Joel himself explains the reason for the crime.
6	6	"I Always Knew I Could Kill"	November 5, 2023
Patrick Pidock committed a murder, and his daughter, Fawn, seeks answers.

=== Season 2 (2025) ===
No. overall	No. in season	Title	Original release date
7	1	"My Father, the Cannibal"	April 28, 2025
After years apart, Jamie-Lee Arrow reunites with her father, Isakin Drabbad, to confront him over his girlfriend's brutal murder and the torment she once suffered at his hands.
8	2	"My Mind Goes to Murder"	May 5, 2025
When Lisa Garcia meets Corey Dean Thomas in Saint Paul, Minnesota, she's falling in love, but he's tightening his grip. Lisa barely survives when he brutally attacks her, but Megan Neely doesn't.
9	3	"I Want to Be Seen as Evil"	May 19, 2025
Growing up, Audrey Evans sees that her brother Jacob craves negative attention. As he grows in Weatherford, Texas, he becomes withdrawn and obsessed with the macabre.
10	4	"He Murdered my Mother"	May 26, 2025
Jenn wants her brother, Jimmy, to admit he killed their mother.
11	5	"Husband, Father, Killer"	June 2, 2025
A man`s wife and daughter want to know why he committed a brutal murder.
12	6	"A True Act of Evil"	June 9, 2025
Kristin struggles to understand how her big brother turned into a killer.
13	7	"Grandpa`s an Assassin"	June 16, 2025
Katie learns that her kindly old grandpa, Buster, was really an assassin.
14	8	"She Was All Darkness"	June 23, 2025
Ashley`s family rips apart after she brutally murders her grandmother.
15	9	"I May Be Cold-Blooded"	June 30, 2025
A man`s mother and brother want to know why he killed his grandmother.
16	10	"A Killer`s Words"	July 7, 2025
Once a teen killer in a gruesome murder-for-hire, Terry seeks redemption. Note: This episode is a follow up to the Evil Lives Here: Shadows of Death episode, "Lost Highway" from Season 1.

== Evil Lives Here: My Child The Killer ==
=== Season 1 (2026) ===
No. overall	No. in season	Title	Original release date
1	1	"Drive To Kil"	March 31, 2026
Justyn Pennell occasionally revealed his violent fantasies to his mom Dawn Haas. But she could never imagine the true terror her son would unleash in Hudson, Florida.
2	2	"A Father's Pain"	April 7, 2026
Ken Acremant was confronted with the reality that his son Robert wasn't the man he thought he knew. He forced into making an agonizing decision no parent should have to make.
3	3	"I'm The Monster's Mother"	April 21, 2026
Jeannette Halton-Tiggs did everything she can to care for her son. Despite every effort, she watched helplessly as Timmy spiraled into darkness. Eventually he committed a crime that devastated Cleveland Heights, Ohio.
4	4	"The Sins of Our Son"	April 28, 2026
When Timothy Jones Jr. killed his family, Tim Sr. were left shattered. Forced to confront the unthinkable truth about the boy he raised and the evil he become.
5	5	"The Child I Thought I Knew"	May 5, 2026
Despite what appears to be a loving family and a sibling bond, Charity Lee could have only hoped for, she could never have foreseen the true monster her son was hiding within.
6	6	"Never Saw It Coming"	May 12, 2026
Robert Crimo Jr. sees nothing out of the ordinary in his son's behavior. He helped his eighteen-year-old son buy a gun, unaware of the devastation it will one day cause.
7	7	"Child in Heaven, One in Jail"	May 19, 2026
A mother mourns her two children – one in heaven, the other in jail.
