= Alexander Watson =

Alexander Watson may refer to:

- Alexander Watson (cricketer, born 1844) (1844–1920), English cricketer
- Alexander Watson (cricketer, born 1945), English cricketer
- Alexander Watson (diplomat) (born 1939), American ambassador and diplomat
- Alexander Watson (historian) (born 1979), British historian, writer, and professor
- Alexander Watson Hutton (1853–1936), Scottish teacher and sportsman
- Alexander Wayne Watson (born 1969), American serial killer

== See also ==
- Alex Watson (disambiguation)
