= Gwendolyn Graham and Cathy Wood =

American serial killer duo

Gwendolyn Graham & Catherine Wood
- Mugshots of Gwen Graham (top) and Cathy Wood (bottom)
- Born: Gwendolyn Gail Graham; August 6, 1963 (age 63); California, U.S. Catherine Wood; March 7, 1962 (age 64); Soap Lake, Washington, U.S.
- Other name: The Lethal Lovers
- Occupation: Nurse's aides at Alpine Manor nursing home
- Status: Graham – Incarcerated at Women's Huron Valley Correctional Facility; Wood – Released from Federal Correctional Institution, Tallahassee on January 16, 2020
- Penalty: Life imprisonment (Graham); 20–40 years imprisonment (Wood)

Details
- Victims: 5
- Span of crimes: January – February 1987
- Country: United States
- State: Michigan
- Date apprehended: December 1988

Gwendolyn Gail Graham (born August 6, 1963) and Catherine May Wood (born March 7, 1962) are American serial killers convicted of killing five elderly women in Walker, Michigan, a suburb of Grand Rapids, in 1987. They committed their crimes in the Alpine Manor nursing home, where they both worked as nurse's aides.

== Crimes ==
The two women met at the Alpine Manor nursing home shortly after Graham had moved to Michigan from Texas. They quickly became friends, and then lovers, in 1986. Two years later they both were facing murder charges for allegedly smothering five elderly patients as part of a "love bond".

The details of the murders came almost entirely from accounts to criminal justice authorities by Wood, whose murder charges were reduced by a plea agreement so she could testify against Graham in Graham's trial for first-degree murder. However, Wood's accounts and her self-portrayal as Graham's pawn were later brought into serious question by award-winning journalist Lowell Cauffiel in his 1992 true crime book, Forever and Five Days.

According to Wood's account, in January 1987, Graham entered the room of a woman who had Alzheimer's disease and smothered her with a washcloth as Wood acted as her lookout. The woman was too incapacitated to fight back, and thus became the pair's first victim. The woman's death appeared to be natural, so an autopsy wasn't performed. Wood claimed Graham murdered the patient to "relieve her tension." Each felt that the secret of the murder would prevent the other partner from leaving, thus cementing their bond.

Over the next few months, Graham murdered four more Alpine Manor patients, Wood alleged. Many of the victims, whose ages ranged from 60 to 98, were incapacitated and suffered from Alzheimer's disease. Wood testified that the couple turned the selection of victims into a game, first trying to choose their victims by their initials to spell M-U-R-D-E-R. But when that became difficult, they began counting each murder as a "day," as in the phrase, "I will love you for forever and a day."

A poem by Wood to Graham, and introduced in the trial, concluded, "You'll be mine forever and five days." Wood also testified that Graham took souvenirs from the victims, keeping them to relive the deaths. However, no such souvenirs were ever discovered by police. Wood also portrayed Graham as being sexually, physically and emotionally dominant in their relationship.

The couple eventually broke up when Graham began dating another female nursing aide who also worked at Alpine Manor. Graham then moved to Texas with the woman and began work in a hospital taking care of infants.

== Investigation ==
The murder investigation began in 1988 after Wood's ex-husband, whom she had told about the murders, went to the police. Detectives for the Walker Police Department extensively questioned Cathy Wood in a series of interviews. She incrementally leaked out her version of the homicides, portraying Graham as the mastermind and hands-on killer. The investigation led to the exhumation of two nursing home victims who had not been cremated. But when medical examination failed to reveal physical evidence of homicide, not entirely unusual in a smothering case, the county medical examiner nevertheless ruled the deaths homicides, basing it on the interviews Wood had given to the police. Warrants were issued for the arrest of Wood and Graham. On December 4–5, 1988, Graham and Wood were arrested and charged with two murders. Wood was apprehended in Walker, Graham in Tyler, Texas.

During the trial, Wood plea-bargained her way to a reduced sentence, claiming that it was Graham who planned and carried out the killings while she served as a lookout or distracted supervisors. Graham maintained her innocence, testifying that the alleged murders were part of an elaborate "mind game" by Wood. Despite the lack of physical evidence, the jury ultimately was swayed by the testimony of Graham's new girlfriend, who revealed that Graham had confessed to five killings.

On November 3, 1989, Graham was found guilty of five counts of murder and one count of conspiracy to commit murder, and the court gave her five life sentences. The victims were Mae Mason, 79, Edith Cook, 98, Marguerite Chambers, 60, Myrtle Luce, 95 and Belle Burkhard, 74. Graham is housed in the Women's Huron Valley Correctional Facility in Pittsfield Charter Township, Michigan.

Wood was charged with one count of second-degree murder and one count of conspiracy to commit second-degree murder. She was sentenced to 20 years on each count and was eligible for parole on March 2, 2005. Wood was incarcerated in the minimum security Federal Correctional Institution, Tallahassee in Florida; she was released January 16, 2020 and is believed to be living with relatives in South Carolina.

== Media ==
The case was the basis of the 1992 true crime book Forever and Five Days by Lowell Cauffiel.

Graham and Wood were featured in two episodes of the TV series The Serial Killers in which they were interviewed about their relationship and crimes. They were also featured on an episode of Snapped: Killer Couples.

The television series American Horror Story tells a highly fictionalized version of their story in its sixth season, Roanoke. The duo are depicted as sisters Miranda and Bridget Jane.

Their case is featured in the fifth episode, titled "Michigan Wolverines", of the fifth season of the show Deadly Sins.

It was also profiled in the 2008 episode "Our Little Secret" of the Investigation Discovery series Wicked Attraction.

Jackie, Cathy Wood's daughter, called in to The Howard Stern Show on June 25, 2019, during the news and discussed her mother's story. "My mom is actually up for parole right now, but the victims' family members are appealing so it's taking a while for her to get out...but she's going to get out." She stayed on the air with Howard for about 10 minutes.

On September 26, 2020, an episode of Oxygen's License To Kill called "A Match Made In Hell" took an in-depth look at the case.

In May 2026, Graham, who now identifies as a transgender man, stated that the killings did not occur, saying that it all began as a joke after watching the film Motel Hell and that Wood later turned the joke into lies when they broke up. Graham further said that it was a game in which Wood ultimately won. The interview came as part of a request to Governor Gretchen Whitmer to grant a pardon to Graham, saying that, aside from denying the crimes, Graham was subjected to homophobia during the trial because much of it centered on the fact that Graham identified then as a lesbian.

== See also ==
- List of homicides in Michigan
- List of serial killers in the United States
- Lucy Letby

== Resources ==
- Buhk, T.T. and Cohle, S.D. (2008). Skeletons in the closet. New York: Prometheus Books.
- Cauffiel, Lowell. Forever And Five Days: The Chilling True Story of Love, Betrayal and Serial Murder in Grand Rapids, Michigan. Pinnacle, 1997. ISBN 0-7860-0469-X
- "Woman Sentenced In Patients' Deaths" (Nov 3, 1989). Worcester Telegram & Gazette.
