= Mack Avenue Skullgame =

Studio album by Big Chief
- Released: September 7, 1993
- Recorded: February 1993
- Studio: High Lo-Fi at White Room Studio (Detroit, Michigan)
- Genres: Funk; rock; R&B; soul; punk rock; alternative rock; psychedelia
- Length: 49:48
- Label: Sub Pop
- Producers: Big Chief; Al Sutton

Big Chief chronology
Face (1991)	Mack Avenue Skullgame (1993)	Platinum Jive (1994)

Singles from Mack Avenue Skullgame
- 1. "One Born Every Minute" Released: 1993

Mack Avenue Skullgame is the second studio album, and third album overall, by American rock band Big Chief, released in September 1993 as their final release for the label Sub Pop. Produced in Detroit with Al Sutton, it departs from the grunge sound the band were known for, instead reflecting the influence of 1970s Blaxploitation films and their funk soundtracks. Considered a funk album, it was also influenced by Detroit bands like the MC5 and contains a horn section, wah-wah effects and psychedelic blues guitars. The band used primitive equipment to help them achieve an authentic sound.

The record is conceptual, serving as the soundtrack to a non-existent Blaxploitation murder mystery film projected by the band members which concerns a tragic love triangle between a pimp, a prostitute and a third character. Inspired by a Lowell Cauffiel book, the story was outlined in the music video for the album's first single, "One Born Every Minute". On release, Mack Avenue Skullgame was a commercial failure, which has been attributed in part to Sub Pop's distribution problems of the period, but has been named the band's finest work by several critics, and is listed in the book 501 Essential Albums of the 90s (2024).

== Background and recording ==
Formed in 1989 in Ann Arbor, Michigan, Big Chief's early sound centred on sludgy, grunge guitars and sounds, and hard rock influences. The band signed with the indie rock label Sub Pop, with whom they released several singles that Get Hip Records issued as the compilation Drive It Off (1991). Big Chief's first studio album for Sub Pop and second overall record, Face (also 1991), featured a similarly heavy but slightly more polished sound, while a subsequent tour opening for the Beastie Boys widened the group's audience in other parts of the United States.

For Mack Avenue Skullgame, the follow-up to Face, Big Chief built upon their love of Blaxploitation films, whose dialogue they had sampled on earlier works; chiefly, they reflected 1970s films like Shaft and Dolemite, and equally their groove-based soundtrack music. According to Big Chief's drummer, Mike Danner, the album's concept is that it acts as a soundtrack to an imaginary film based on a book that all of the band members had read, adding: "We actually took major scenes from the book and wrote songs for them as if it were a movie." The biographer Andy Kellman identifies the book as true crime author Lowell Cauffiel's Skullgame (1988). In an interview with The Kalamazoo Gazette, Danner said that it was "inevitable" that the group would record an album with a Blaxploitation funk style, as they had planned such a record for three years. He added that, by writing songs for each scene for the story, including giving each character a theme song, Big Chief worked in the opposite method to their usual songwriting approach, where songs emerged through jams. The group's favorite records and influences spanned rock, funk and jazz, so they found it smooth executing the concept musically.

Big Chief recorded the album at White Room Studio in Detroit in February 1993, co-producing it with Al Sutton, who also acted as engineer. To achieve the desired authentic 1970s sound, they employed outdated equipment. Before recording began, Big Chief were set on not being considered "a run-of-the-mill guitar band", and their widening musical palette on Mack Avenue Skullgame made them stand out against the influx of bands influenced by Nirvana. The record, according to Danner, was a reaction against the "Seattle grunge movement", which the group was a major influence on. The musician deemed it "very different" from Seattle grunge but not a total departure from Big Chief's earlier work, which had always been funky but "not straight-up funk like this."

Blues singer Thornetta Davis, who appeared on two songs on Face, returned in a greater role on Mack Avenue Skullgame. It was one of several Detroit-based albums she guested on in the period, alongside Bob Seger's The Fire Inside (1991). The record was completed by April 1993, when The Michigan Daily were invited to hear it; previewing the album in their April 15 edition, the newspaper listed it among the best music of 1993 and said it should help make the band bigger than Alice in Chains, writing that the band "groove like Funkadelic live on the Cass Corridor."

== Composition ==
=== Concept ===
Mack Avenue Skullgame acts as a soundtrack to a non-existent Blaxploitation film of the same name conceptualised by the members of Big Chief. Variously described as a grisly murder mystery or suspense film, or an arthouse film noir, the projected film has been credited to Detroit-based filmmakers Mike Clark and Sean O'Neill, and Danner spoke in 1993 of the group's intention to fund and film it themselves, but Kellman retrospectively describes it as a "non-film, a conceptual hoax". Described by Danner as concerning a love triangle between a prostitute, a pimp and "a sucker", the story features elements of tragedy, and depicts a "fictitious gutter's eye tale of battling pimps, whores with a heart of gold and suckers who get iced along the way". By the end of the album, Mack—the central pimp character—is jailed for murder and asks one of his prostitutes to send him 70 percent of her earnings.

=== Musical style and songs ===
Mack Avenue Skullgame combines the sound of 1970s Blaxploitation soundtracks with Big Chief's rock foundations, resulting in what Kellman describes as "numerous strains of rock and R&B." According to the critic David Stubbs, the band eschewed their grunge roots for 1970s, pre-disco funk music, "complete with brass section and screaming wah-wahs". Tight grooves are provided by Dannner's drums with bassist Matt O'Brien, energized by the twin guitars of Mark Dancey and Phil Durr, and singer Barry Henssler's rough vocals. The guitar work is of a psychedelic blues style, with Durr essaying groovy guitar licks, like the "swirling jazzy riffs" of "Monica". Further embellishing the album are Davis' pleading blues vocals, and a horn section, including saxophonist Dave McMurray. The record has been noted for its expansive sound, with a high quota of "spare, almost ambient funk and incidental musical passages." Commentaries have described it as a song cycle, and, in the case of author Ari Abramowitz, an example of "post-grunge blaxploitation".

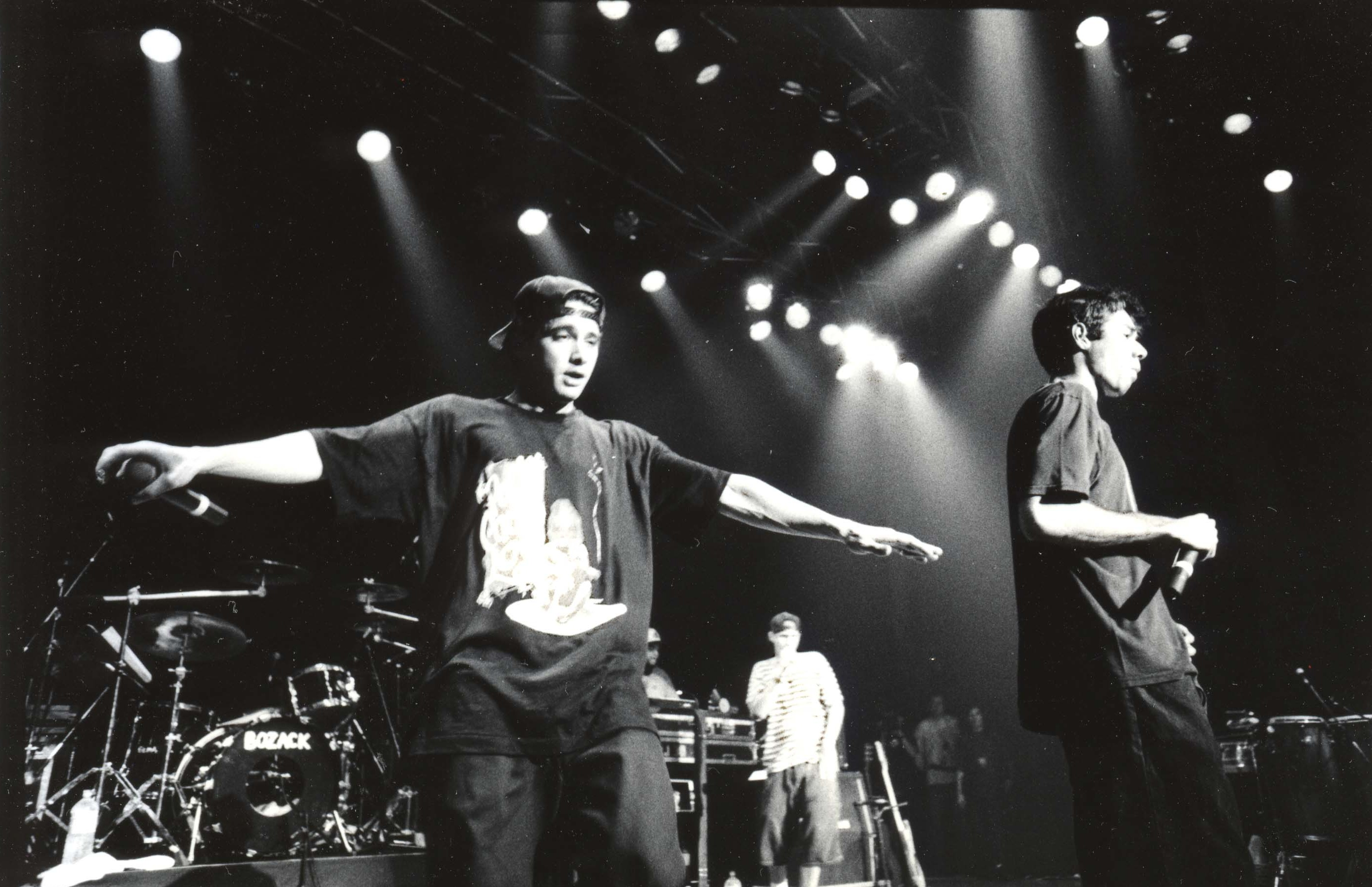
Comparisons were drawn between Mack Avenue Skullgame and the Beastie Boys (1992).

The album is influenced by vintage Detroit funk, the dual-guitar aggression of MC5, and punk rock. Further inspirations include P-Funk, the Stooges, Isaac Hayes and Curtis Mayfield. The record is also dedicated to the guitarist Eddie Hazel, who influenced many of the album's licks. The Wire comment that the "rock 'n' soul-inflected" album is highly indebted to groove-based Detroit music. While Big Chief remained a rock band at core, they bolstered their "aggressive riffs" with brass and funk sensibilities evocative of George Clinton, according to Stubbs. The critic Tony Norman writes that the record is "as fluid and funky" as Blaxploitation music but with "the requisite amount of feedback and noise" to make it acceptable to audiences who ignored black music in the 1970s. Comparisons have been made with the Beastie Boys' albums Check Your Head (1992) and Ill Communication (1994), albeit with a stronger emphasis on funk and soul, and the soundtracks of Blaxploitation films like Shaft's Big Score (1972) and Three the Hard Way (1974).

Songs such as "Skullgame No.3, Take 3", "Cut to the Chase" and "Meet the Man Day" feature examples of jazzy blues guitar riffs which transform into funk rock. "My Name Is Pimp" is sung by Henssller in a Issac Hayes-esque growl, with an intensity and humor comparable to the Beastie Boys and Urge Overkill. "One Born Every Minute (Doc's Theme)" and "No Free Love on This Street (Sonica's Theme)" demonstrate Big Chief's move away from the "retro-irony" style of Monster Magnet. The former song is a horn-driven song based around a gliding bass slide with synthesised brass from a Yamaha keyboard, while the latter song is a funk rock "hooker's lament" featuring Thornetta Davis, whose holler combines with the "barmy funk" of the backing to create bluesy soul music. The album temporarily abandons funk for a fast, riff-based hardcore punk song, "Cop Kisser (Mack Fucks Up the Scene at the Freezer)". A minute in length, it reveals Big Chief's punk roots and is comparable to Henssler's early 1980s band the Necros. On "Nickel", Durr performs a blues guitar solo. Brief, instrumental interludes (such as "Gaiety Lounge Punk") appear between songs to "convey the seediness and alleyways of the Superfly film world."

== Release and promotion ==
"One Born Every Minute" was released as a CD single in 1993 ahead of the album, with an edit of the song as a B-side. Reviewing the single, The Hard Report dubbed it a "colorful, super hi-vibey, funky slam jam" in a 1970s soul style with "scratch and move effects" that made it unusual for a heavy metal offering, while Kerrang!'s Mike Peake named it a "smooth ride through the mind of a lounge lizard" and a suitable preview for the album. The song's music video, directed by Seattle-based Shaun O'Neal, acts as a companion to the album, outlining the storyline for the imaginary film, and concerns a tough pimp played by Danner, who pays his prostitutes with heroin. One prostitute, Sonica, dreams of moving to the country. The band began a tour with a show in Chicago on August 5, 1993. Further shows in the U.S. were booked with the Smashing Pumpkins before the tour moved to Canada and Europe. Reviewing their show at London's Camden Underworld on November 10, Peake commented that the "funk-based" Mack Avenue Skullgame did not prepare audiences for the group's metal roots, naming it "one leaf of a whopping, sprawling tree."

Released on September 7, 1993, on major formats, (Note: The release date has also been given as September 10, 1993.) Mack Avenue Skullgame was Big Chief's third overall album and final release on Sub Pop, who marketed the album in part to metal audiences. Some writers expressed reservations about the album's reception; the journalist Rob Fiend believed that the group's mix of 1960s, 1970s and contemporary rock held potential with album radio but that airplay on college and hard rock radio was not guaranteed, whereas Norman felt that because the band members were white yet effectively proving how "interesting" black music was in the Blaxploitation era, the album would frustrate nationalist critics who "feel that the world-beat initiative got away from black folks in much the same way." As with Big Chief's earlier albums for Sub Pop, Mack Avenue Skullgame did not sell strongly enough for a Gold certificate. Copies of the album risked being hard to find due to the label's distribution issues, as it was released while it dropped its distributor Caroline and looked to work with the distribution arm of Warner-Time. According to Kellman, it underperformed commercially, with Sub Pop's support—most notably on the distribution front—being minimal.

== Critical reception ==
Professional ratings
Review scores
Source	Rating
AllMusic	4/5 stars
The Encyclopedia of Popular Music	3/5 stars
Fort Worth Star-Telegram	1/4 stars
Kerrang!	5/5 stars
Select	4/5 stars

In his review for Gavin, Rob Fiend praised Mack Avenue Skullgame for its psychedelic-oriented music, believing that Big Chief were an excellent example of a contemporary rock band reintreprting the guitar and bass grooves of Jimi Hendrix, Led Zeppelin and Pink Floyd, and adding that they "could be the MC5 of the '90s". He believed that, due to elements like the horn section, Big Chief's sound may discourage some metalheads but would please fans of rock music "with an ear for the psychedelic". Tony Norman of Pittsburgh Post-Gazette named it the "most compelling case of stylistic mimicry" for many years, believing that the group "displays a parodist's understanding" of Blaxploitation's "criminal-minded machismo and campy misogyny without sacrificing the musical values that made it worthwhile." Norman added that while the Beastie Boys and Red Hot Chili Peppers hinted at the "potential greatness" of revived Blaxploitation music, Big Chief's example "is the album to beat." Guitar World likened it to a collaboration between Black Sabbath and the Black Panthers, believing the band were second only to the Red Hot Chili Peppers in their fusion of metal and funk.

Less favorably, Fort Worth Star-Telegram reviewer Malcolm Mayhew opined that it contains some interesting songs, singling out Thornetta Davis' vocals on "No Free Love on This Street" as "momentous", but conceded that "the record itself – a closet of alt-rock, punk and soul – is so full of wah-wah guitar playing and horns, it sinks by the time you find out the band is suffering from an obvious identity crisis". Among British reviewers, Andrew Perry of Select deemed it an inspired, rocking album which was unusual for making the connection between P-Funk and Stooges/MC5-style rock, adding that it "struts and snaps its fingers like the pimp in planning-permission flares in a blaxploitation flick." David Stubbs, in Melody Maker, complimented the group's surprise, "superbad" change in direction and praised their sincerity, as evident in Henssler's "jive, husting vocals" and several "sublime" musical moments, in particular praising "No Free Love on This Street" for "[jarring] your soul" more effectively than any other song in 1993. In Kerrang!, Gordon Goldstein likened the album's sound to a jam between the Beastie Boys, Curtis Mayfield, Soundgarden and the Blaxploitation star Rudy Ray Moore, deeming it "as shudderingly heavy as it is funky, laid back and cool."

In The Philadelphia Inquirer, Tom Moon ranked it among the ten best pop albums of 1993. Retrospectively, AllMusic's Andy Kellman named it the band's finest work and felt it was not a gimmick despite the influence of Blaxploitation films being uncommon when the record was released; he added: "Save for the Beastie Boys, hardly any non-black acts were adopting such a stance as a means of embracing and acknowledging black culture. While later outfits would use this as a ploy for cuteness and attention, Big Chief was doing it out of pure admiration." Gary Graff of Trouser Press described it as "an oddity in the Big Chief oeuvre" for its expansive, sparser sound resembling music by a collective more than a band, but felt that despite the presence of some strong songs, it is less satisfying than Face. Sam Steele of NME contended that the "raucous, although not entirely rivetting" album was chiefly notable for being a film noir soundtrack and for the "sleazy hooker" song "No Free Love on This Street".

== Legacy ==
Thornetta Davis' major work on Mack Avenue Skullgame led to Big Chief backing the singer on her debut EP for Sub Pop, Shout Out (To the Dusthuffer) (1994), which was the label's first acid jazz release. Specifically, the title song was written for her by the band and in particular Henssler, who was inspired by Davis' performance on "No Free Love on This Street". Big Chief also backed Davis on her album Sunday Morning Music (1996), released after the group disbanded. The singer Iggy Pop referred to Mack Avenue Skullgame as his "favorite album to jump around to".

Hobey Echlin of the Detroit Metro Times reflected that Big Chief represented the "post-punk front" of Detroit's music scene in the early 1990s, fusing the Seattle sound with wry local touchstones like the MC5 and P-Funk, and described Mack Avenue Skullgame as "a masterpiece of conceptual kicked-out jams and funk, replete with horn sections and a modern Pygmalion myth about a Cass Corridor hooker and a prominent doctor who met his end trying to save her". The album is listed in the book 501 Essential Albums of the 90s (2024); contributor Willy Wislon deemed it the band's "musical masterpiece" and felt that, aside from the Beastie Boys, "no one pulled off anything like this better." Kellman contends that, as Mack Avenue Skullgame was released shortly before the emergence of stylistically similar post-grunge bands, Big Chief's move away from traditional rock music "ultimately ended up being a wise and rather prophetic move."

== Track listing ==
All songs written by Big Chief.

1. "Skullgame No. 3, Take 3" – 1:56
2. "My Name Is Pimp (Mack's Theme)" – 4:56
3. "Let's Do It Again" – 1:06
4. "One Born Every Minute (Doc's Theme)" – 5:27
5. "Sonica" – 1:53
6. "No Free Love on This Street (Sonica's Theme)" – 4:44
7. "Soul on a Roll" – 0:50
8. "10 Karat Pinky Ring" – 4:53
9. "Have Another Glass of Brandy, Baby" – 1:19
10. "Gaiety Lounge Punk" – 0:40
11. "Cop Kisser (Mack Fucks Up the Scene at the Freezer)" – 1:26
12. "If I Had a Nickel for Every Dime" – 6:58
13. "Mixed Jive" – 1:53
14. "He Needs to Be Dead/Ten Easy Pieces (The Power of Ginsu)" – 2:57
15. "Cut to the Chase" – 2:52
16. "Meet the Man Day" – 1:28
17. "O Woman (Mack's Lament)" – 3:52
18. "Skullgame (Reprise)" – 1:52

== Personnel ==
Adapted from the liner notes of Mack Avenue Skullgame

- Barry Henssler – vocals
- Scott Guy – vocals
- Thornetta Davis – vocals
- 2 Hi Men's Choir – vocals
- Un-Greek Chorus – vocals
- Matt O'Brien – bass
- Mike "Mike D." Danner – drums
- Mark Dancey – guitar, rhythm guitar
- Phil Durr – guitar, photography
- Kenny Olson – guitar
- Dave McMurray – horns
- Rayce Biggs – horns
- Tom "Sh'Booty Shabazz" Tasker – keyboards
- Ed Alterman – percussion
- Al Sutton – producer, engineer
- Big Chief – writer, producer
- Doug Coombe – band photos
