= Alex Watson =

Alex Watson or Alec Watson may refer to:

- Alex Watson (footballer) (born 1968), English association football (soccer) player
- Alex Watson (football manager) (1864–1931), English association football (soccer) manager
- Alex Watson (pentathlete) (born 1957), Australian modern pentathlete
- Alex Watson (rugby league) (1931–2002), Australian rugby league footballer
- Alec Watson (cricketer) (1844–1920), Scottish cricketer
- Alec Watson (YouTuber), creator of Technology Connections, a YouTube channel

== See also ==
- Alexander Watson (disambiguation)
