= Cauffiel =

Cauffiel is a surname. Notable people with the surname include:

- Jessica Cauffiel (born 1976), American actress and singer
- Lowell Cauffiel (born 1951), American true crime author, novelist, screenwriter, and film and television producer
