= Platinum Jive =

Studio album by Big Chief
- Released: 1994
- Genre: Alternative rock, funk rock
- Label: Capitol
- Producer: Phil Nicolo, Big Chief

Big Chief chronology
Mack Avenue Skullgame (1993)	Platinum Jive (1994)

Platinum Jive is an album by the American band Big Chief, released in 1994. Subtitled "(Greatest Hits 1969-1999)", the band presented it as a greatest hits collection, although it is made up entirely of original songs. Released by Capitol Records, Platinum Jive was the band's major label debut, and also their final album.

The band supported the album by touring with the Goats, and then the Cult.

== Production ==
The album was produced by Phil Nicolo and Big Chief. Schoolly D contributed a rap verse to "Bona Fide". Guitar player Mark Dancey designed the album artwork. The liner notes to the "greatest hits" album list the band's concocted albums, with titles such as We Gotta Impeach Nixon, White Like Mike, and Barry Henssler: The Sexual Intellectual.

== Critical reception ==
Professional ratings
Review scores
Source	Rating
AllMusic	3/5 stars
Calgary Herald	A−
The Encyclopedia of Popular Music	3/5 stars
MusicHound Rock: The Essential Album Guide	2.5/5 stars
Rock Hard	8.5/10

Trouser Press thought that "the rock/funk synthesis is even more seamless, resulting in heavy music that drives hard and with great invention—including ample spicy sonic details provided by flutes, horns and deftly arranged backup vocals." Guitar Player deemed the album "workingman's grunge-funk with a nihilist's sense of black humor." The Calgary Herald concluded that, "like the Beastie Boys, Big Chief manages to transcend their influences while blurring the distinction between black get-down funk and white riff-rock." The Tampa Tribune noted that the album "meshes all of [the band's] hometown influences from the MC5 to George Clinton."

The Washington Post determined that "the Chiefs really can play funk, metal and a credible hybrid of the two, and their affection for booming bass, swaggering guitar and cowbell accents is palpable." The New York Times described Platinum Jive as "a fake compilation that ranges from hard guitar rock written in the style of late 1960's Detroit bands like the Stooges and MC5 to rap." The Atlanta Journal wrote that "Big Chief fully embraces mindless, muscle-bound '70s riffage, making music that is equal parts raunchy homage and ironic cackle." The Wisconsin State Journal stated that "Big Chief plays raggedy, guitar-fueled, funk-inflected, lighthearted alternative rock."

AllMusic called the album "a step backward musically, because the band seems to resort back to its heavy rock roots, not further developing the funk and soul elements of Skullgame," writing that "it's not without its good moments, being more hit than miss and sufficiently enjoyable."

== Track listing ==
No.	Title	Length
1.	"Lion's Mouth"
2.	"Take Over Baby"
3.	"John's Scared"
4.	"M.D. 20/20"
5.	"Map of Your Failure"
6.	"Bona Fide"
7.	"Armed Love"
8.	"Philly Nocturne"
9.	"Locked Out"
10.	"All Downhill from Here"
11.	"The Liquer Talkin'"
12.	"Sick to My Pants"
13.	"Your Days Are Numbered"
14.	"Clown Pimp"
15.	"Simply Barry"
16.	"Lot Lizard"
