= Paul Kenneth Keller =

American serial arsonist and murderer

- Born: January 6, 1966 (age 60); Everett, Washington
- Other name: Specter
- Occupations: Advertising salesman, Bookkeeper, Security guard
- Convictions: 32 counts of arson 3 counts of first-degree murder

Details
- Country: United States

Paul Kenneth Keller (born January 6, 1966) is a serial arsonist and convicted murderer from Lynnwood, Washington. He is serving 107 years in prison and will be eligible for parole in 2079. He was convicted of setting over 107 fires and admitted to setting over 76 of them, making him one of the most prolific serial arsonists in American history. His fires killed at least three people and caused more than $30 million in property damage during a six-month period during 1992–1993.

== In popular culture ==
Keller's story was depicted in a 1995 CBS movie of the week called Not Our Son starring Neil Patrick Harris. His case was also featured on the Forensic Files episode "Fire Proof". In that program, it was reported that Keller has said that he was molested by a volunteer fireman when he was twelve years old. His family has been described as being devoutly Lutheran. Some of the fires he set were at Lutheran churches. Criminal Minds mentioned him in the 2007 episode "Ashes and Dust," a drama about another serial arsonist. His story was also featured on the true-crime television series Evil Lives Here in the episode "Not My Boy," which aired on Investigation Discovery on January 1, 2017.

== Victims ==
On September 22, 1992, Keller set fire to Seattle's Four Freedoms House retirement home; three people were killed (Bertha Nelson, age 93; Mary Dorris, age 77; and Adeline Stockness, age 70).
