= Robert Lee Walden =

American murderer, serial rapist and suspected serial killer

- 1992 Mugshot of Robert Lee Walden
- Born: Robert Lee Walden, Jr. November 15, 1966 (age 59); Chicago, Illinois, U.S.
- Convictions: First degree murder (2 counts); Kidnapping (5 counts); Sexual assault (8 counts); Sexual abuse (2 counts); Aggravated assault (2 counts); Robbery; Second degree burglary (2 counts); Theft
- Penalty: Death

Details
- Victims: 2–3
- Span of crimes: 1990–1991
- Country: United States
- State: Arizona
- Date apprehended: June 1991
- Imprisoned at: Florence State Prison, Florence, Arizona, U.S.

Robert Lee Walden Jr. (born November 15, 1966) is an American murderer, serial rapist and suspected serial killer who attacked several women in Tucson, Arizona from 1989 to 1992, raping four and killing two of them. Sentenced to death on one count and to several life terms for his other crimes, Walden confessed to a third murder after his trial, for which he has never been tried.

== Early life ==
Robert Lee Walden was born on November 15, 1966, in Chicago, Illinois, the second of four children. His childhood was somewhat troubled, as his father was an alcoholic who frequently changed jobs and belittled him and his siblings during his drunken stupors. Walden claimed that at some point in his youth he was also sexually abused, but this has never been conclusively verified. However, aside from these issues, the Waldens were considered a respectable family, with the parents encouraging Robert to do well in school, and in particular, sports. Walden claimed that while he was in college, he was on the student council, studied German and was supposedly offered a baseball scholarship, but had to turn it down due to a knee injury.

After graduating college, Walden joined the United States Air Force in 1985, where he was noted for his heavy drinking, and the following year, he was discharged for writing bad checks. Soon after, Walden moved to Tucson, Arizona, where he met 16-year-old single mother Catherine "Cathy" Mills, who eventually married him against her mother's wishes. Not long after, he began to physically and verbally abuse his wife, even beating her while she was pregnant with their first child. Reportedly, Walden forced her to engage in sexual acts against her will, which would then be a case of marital rape.

== Crimes ==
In 1989, Walden was charged with attacking two women in separate incidents in Tucson: the first took place in July and involved a hit-and-run incident with a bicyclist, while the latter took place the next month when he briefly choked a hitchhiker he had picked up. Instead of prison time, Justice John Kelly ordered that Walden be sent to a boot camp at the Florence State Prison, where he remained for some time. Twelve days before the completion of the program, he was accused of stealing candy from other inmates and kicked out. Walden later pleaded guilty to the incident but sent a letter to the judge proclaiming that he had learned his lesson and would be truthful from now on. Despite objections from correctional officers over his prospective release, Justice John Kelly decided to put him on intensive probation. However, due to negligence in screening procedures, Walden was allowed to take on a job as an exterminator for the Arizona Chemical Service Company, allowing him to drive freely around town and without supervision.

Soon after, a series of rapes began in the city, all of which were connected by the fact that they were attacked seemingly at random and often in apartment complexes, with the assailant frequently taunting them during the assaults. The first such case took place on August 9, 1989, when Walden abducted a woman who was checking her mail at her apartment complex, near the intersection of North Alvernon Way and East Blacklidge Drive. Under the threat of a knife, he drove to an abandoned gas station, he raped the woman and later stole her Dodge Omni, which he eventually abandoned. On December 22, 1990, he attacked 31-year-old Nola Jean Knight while she was out to pick up her laundry. During the process, Walden raped and beat her severely, killing her in the process. Knight's naked and battered body was later found by her husband behind a local Circle K store.

On May 4, 1991, Walden was hanging around an apartment complex on South Craycroft Street, where he happened upon a woman who was searching to pick up some friends for a breakfast date. After telling her that her friends were supposedly in the apartment, he caught up with the victim, stabbed her in the back, and threatened to kill her if she did not come with him. Walden then pushed her into a laundry room and told her to take off her clothes, then raped her. After finishing, he told her to stay put until he came back. Subsequently, he returned and raped her again, then left. The woman then redressed herself and ran to the car, whereupon she called her boyfriend.

On May 15, posing as a plumber, Walden knocked on the door of an apartment on North Alvernon Way and East Blacklidge Drive, and informed the woman living inside that he was there to check her plumbing system. As the apartment's pipes had been leaking at the time, she let him in, but after he invited her to join him in the upstairs bathroom, the woman refused and picked up the phone to call for help. Upon doing so, Walden grabbed her from behind and wrapped the telephone cord around her neck, before dragging her to the bathroom and wrapping the hairdryer cord around her neck. After binding and gagging the victim with her own clothes, Walden proceeded to rape her, taunting her whenever she cried out. After pretending to leave several times, Walden eventually left the apartment, allowing the woman to free herself and call the police. She provided a description of her attacker, pointing out that he wore what appeared to be a company uniform consisting of a red shirt and blue pants, as well as a large ring of keys and a pager. After this assault, Walden's co-workers reported that he got a shorter haircut and stopped carrying the pager and keys.

On June 13, Walden returned to the apartment complex on North Alvernon Way and East Blacklidge Drive, where he knocked on the door of 31-year-old Miguela "Lida" Burhans, a neighbor of a previous rape victim. Upon entering, he immediately attacked her, raping and hitting Burhans with a lamp, shattering the object into her back. He then attempted to strangle her with the lamp cord, but was unable to finish her off due to fierce resistance. Angered, Walden pulled out a knife and slashed one of her breasts and chest, before finally cutting her throat. Burhans' body was later found by her husband, who immediately informed the police.

== Arrest, trial and sentence ==
After fingerprint evidence linked the same perpetrator to all three cases, the Tucson Police Department released a facial composite of the supposed offender. This led to the generation of more than 300 tips, including from Walden's wife and probation officer. As he was a violent felon, his fingerprints were checked by police, and subsequently matched to the Burhans crime scene, resulting in his arrest. While he was lodged in the Pima County Jail on $1 million bond, Tucson police sought search warrants to search his house, previous apartment, and workplace for any potential clues. Through this investigation, he was linked to the remaining cases, as well as the February 7 rape and murder of 26-year-old secretary Denene Brevaire-Domet, who was bludgeoned to death with a cinder block. The arrest came as a shock to his employers, with his manager saying in an interview that he had never known of Walden's previous criminal record. After Walden was charged with Burhans' murder, her family members sued the state, the Arizona Chemical Service Company and Walden's probation officer, citing in the lawsuit that their collective negligence allowed him to kill their loved one.

Walden was first brought to trial for the 1989 rape, for which he was quickly convicted, but his sentence was not decided immediately as he had other trials lined up. At his murder trial, prosecutors described him as an unfeeling psychopath and manipulator who liked to torment his victims, with one detective, Brian Jones, describing him as the worst offender he had come across in his entire career up until then. In contrast, Walden claimed that he was just a convenient fall guy who was targeted on circumstantial evidence, while his defense attorney, Donald Klein, emphasized on mitigating circumstances for his client, pointing out that he was a gifted athlete who financially supported his family and was supposedly a model inmate.

Klein's arguments did not sway the jury, and Walden was eventually convicted of killing Burhans and Knight, as well as the four rapes. He was sentenced to death for the Burhans murder and given five life terms for the other crimes. A few months after his sentencing, Walden confessed to the murder of Brevaire-Domet, but as he was already under a sentence of death, prosecutors decided not to charge him.

== Imprisonment and aftermath ==
As of February 2025, Walden remains on Arizona's death row. He has repeatedly filed appeals to his sentence, claiming that he should have been tried separately for each of the crimes he had been accused of, with the latest such appeal being rejected by the Circuit Court of Appeals in 2021. In 2017, he and several other inmates on Arizona's death row were interviewed on the conditions inside Florence State Prison, ranging from access to recreational activities and watching television.

== In the media and culture ==
Walden's crime spree was covered on an episode of the documentary series Evil Lives Here's tenth season, titled "I Want to Watch His Last Breath". The episode featured an interview with his wife, who recounted her life with him and the events that led to his arrest. During the interview, she expressed her desire to attend his eventual execution, as she felt it would bring her closure.

== See also ==
- Capital punishment in Arizona
- List of death row inmates in the United States § Arizona
- List of serial rapists
