= William Darrell Lindsey =

American serial killer (1935–2001)

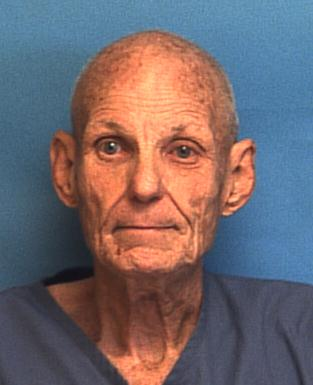
- Mug shot of Lindsey
- Born: May 18, 1935; Palatka, Florida, U.S
- Died: April 17, 2001 (aged 65); Marion Correctional Institute, Ocala, Florida, U.S
- Other name: "Crazy Bill"
- Spouses: Willa Jean (m. 1958; div. 1975) Annie Langley (m. 1975; died 1992)
- Children: 7
- Status: Deceased
- Conviction: Second-degree murder (x6)
- Penalty: 30 years imprisonment

Details
- Victims: 6 convicted, 8 confirmed, 12-20 confessed
- Span of crimes: 1983–1996
- Country: United States
- States: Florida, North Carolina (confirmed); Virginia, Tennessee (confessed)
- Target: Prostitutes
- Date apprehended: December 1996

William Darrell "Bill" Lindsey (born Armstrong; May 18, 1935 – April 17, 2001), also known as Crazy Bill, was an American serial killer who murdered seven women in St. Augustine, Florida, and one in Asheville, North Carolina, between 1983 and 1996. As part of a plea deal, he pleaded guilty to six of the murders and received a 30-year sentence in Florida. On April 17, 2001, he died of cancer whilst imprisoned.

== Early life ==
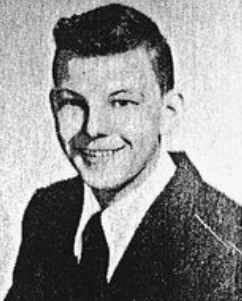
Lindsey as a junior in high school

William Darrell Lindsey was born William Armstrong Jr. in Palatka on March 18, 1935, the only child of William, a roofer, and Mabel Armstrong, a homemaker. On August 18, 1935, when Lindsey was five months old, he was in the car with his parents when, for unknown reasons, the car swerved off the road and crashed. William and Mabel, in the front and passenger seats, died on impact. Lindsey, found wedged between the front and back seats, only sustained minor scratches and bruises.

A local couple from St. Augustine, Cecil and Olean Lindsey, who had recently experienced the loss of their infant son, adopted William. Besides William, the Lindseys had three other children, two older daughters and a son. Cecil, his adoptive father, was a well-liked man who worked multiple jobs, his favorite being an actor for a local town attraction. Olean, his adoptive mother, was a nurse. Olean, a religious woman, was physically and emotionally abusive to her children. She viewed what was typically considered regular mischievousness as sinful, and felt it was her duty to punish those who perpetrated these actions. She frequently beat her children with frying pans and leather straps, pulled their hair, pinched them, and berated them. Cecil was submissive to his wife, allowing her to discipline their children and control all other household matters while he focused on work and other community events.

During his childhood, William tortured multiple cats, killing one. He also set a hut on fire that other boys in his neighborhood had built. In school, he was described as a c-grade student with low intelligence. He had been held back several times, reaching grade 12 at age 21. A small, meek child, he was bullied by classmates and other children in his neighborhood. Lindsey had no close friends and did not participate in any extracurricular activities. He did, however, have a job as a busboy at a local restaurant.

== Victims ==
#	Name	Age	Date of death	Place of death	Cause of death	Weapon used
1	Lisa Foley	24	October 9, 1983	West Pope Road, St. Augustine Beach, Florida	Strangulation	Hands
2	Anita McQuaig Stevens	27	November 29, 1988	Fish Island Road, St. Augustine, Florida	Bludgeoning	Wood plank
3	Constance Marie "Connie" Terrell	26	June 10, 1989	Holmes Boulevard, St. Augustine, Florida	Gunshot wound to the head	.22 caliber semi-automatic rifle
4	Lashawna Streeter	27	March 1, 1992	Four Mile Road, St. Augustine, Florida	Beating	Hands
5	Donetha Snead-Haile	32	April 1993 (Note: Snead-Haile's family reported she went missing on April 21, but Lindsey claimed to have killed her on April 4.)	King Street, St. Augustine, Florida	Unknown	Unknown
6	Cheryl Denise "“Niecey" Lucas	32	Mid-June 1995	Palmer Street, St. Augustine, Florida	Bludgeoning	Metal nail bar
7	Diana Richardson	48	October 12, 1995	Holmes Boulevard, St. Augustine, Florida	Beating	Hands
8	Lucy Arnett Raymer	32	December 25, 1996	Chunns Cove Rd, Asheville, North Carolina	Blows to the head	

== Arrest and legal proceedings ==
Lindsey was arrested for Lucy Raymer's murder after a taxi driver witnessed her going into Lindsey's trailer on the night of her murder. Detectives soon linked him to the Florida murders as well, and Lindsey made a full confession.

Although he was originally believed to only be responsible for the murders of six women in St. Augustine between 1988 and 1996, it was found he was also responsible for the unsolved 1983 murder of Lisa Foley. Lindsey picked her photo out of a lineup and identified her as a woman he strangled during an argument after sex. Lisa was last seen with Lindsey at the Tradewinds Lounge in downtown St. Augustine on October 9, 1983. Her body was found in a marshy area on West Pope Road near St. Augustine Beach five days later. Lindsey wasn't linked to her murder until January 1997.

On May 21, 1999, he pleaded guilty to four counts of second-degree murder in the cases of Anita Stevens, Constance Terrell, Lashawna Street, and Cheryl Lucas. On July 8 of that year, he pleaded guilty to the two remaining murders – those of Donetha Snead-Haile and Diana Richardson. He was sentenced to 30 years' imprisonment.

== Death ==
On April 17, 2001, Lindsey died from cancer whilst imprisoned at the Marion Correctional Institute in Ocala, Florida.

== In media ==
Season five, episode eight of Investigation Discovery's Evil Lives Here, titled, "I Hate Being Daddy's Girl," is about the childhood of Robin Lindsey, one of Lindsey's daughters.

See also Deadly Lust (2005) by Marie and McCay Vernon.

== Bibliography ==
- Vernon, McCay; Vernon, Marie (2005). Deadly Lust. New York: Kensington Books. ISBN 9780786016990.
