= Big Chief (American band) =

American funk rock band

Big Chief was an American funk rock band from Ann Arbor, Michigan.

== History ==
Big Chief was founded in 1989 by several veterans of the Michigan hardcore punk scene, including Barry Henssler, who had been a member of Necros. They began attracting major label attention even before releasing any songs. After the release of their debut seven-inch record, "Brake Torque", Sub Pop offered to put out another seven-inch single. After several more single releases, the group compiled them on Drive It Off, released on Get Hip Recordings in 1991. Later that year, the group released its debut album, Face, in Germany; Sub Pop issued the album for the American market in mid-1992. In 1993, Sub Pop released their sophomore album, Mack Avenue Skullgame, after which the group switched to major label Capitol Records, who released the group's third and final LP, Platinum Jive, in 1994. The group disbanded in 1996, though some members remained together on the magazine Motorbooty until the end of the decade; Motorbooty featured illustrations by guitarist Mark Dancey, however it was not a fanzine and in fact had a policy of never mentioning Big Chief. Bassist Matt O'Brien went on to play with The Numbers, The Detroit Cobras, The Detroit City Council, Octopus, and a short stint with Jack Oblivion. vocalist Barry Henssler worked in Chicago clubs as DJ Chamberweed; and Phil Dürr played with the groups Five Horse Johnson, Giant Brain, Luder, and Variac.

On January 11, 2019, guitarist Phill Dürr died of a heart attack at age 53 while visiting family in Germany.

== Members ==
- Barry Henssler - vocals
- Thornetta Davis - vocals
- Mike Danner - drums
- Matt O'Brien - bass
- Mark Dancey - guitar
- Phil Dürr - guitar

== Discography ==
- Drive It Off (Get Hip Recordings, 1991)
- Face (Sub Pop, 1992)
- Mack Avenue Skullgame (Sub Pop, 1993)
- Platinum Jive (Capitol Records, 1994)
