= Technology Connections =

YouTube channel about technology

Alec Watson

YouTube information
- Channel: Technology Connections
- Years active: 2015–present
- Genre: Documentary
- Subscribers: 3.2 million
- Views: 444 million
- Last updated: July 07, 2026; 3 months ago

Technology Connections is an American YouTube channel covering the history and mechanics of consumer electronics, home appliances, and other pieces of technology, created by Alec Watson of Chicago, Illinois. Subjects of focus include transportation, HVAC, refrigeration, automotive, photography, and home audio and video, among others. The channel has received praise for Watson's humor and the depth and insight of his research.

== History ==
Watson registered the Technology Connections channel on YouTube in November 2014, with his first video, exploring Alexander Graham Bell's role in the history of sound reproduction, uploaded in September 2015. In the years since, Watson has released videos covering other aspects of consumer audiovisual technology—home audio and video in particular—releasing a five-part documentary miniseries on the Compact Disc audio format by Sony and Philips in 2018; and the Capacitance Electronic Disc home video format by RCA between 2019 and 2020. As well as these subjects, Watson has also explored the mechanics and history of various telephony products, aspects of television broadcasting, videocassette recorders, home appliances, electrical wiring, and more. Watson often interjects his explanations with humorous and satirical asides, as well as critiques of some of the technologies he discusses.

In February 2020, Watson's Technology Connections channel was briefly and erroneously demonetized for supposed violations of YouTube's Partner Program policies. The monetization was restored after the demonetization caused an uproar on social media. Reclaim the Net attributed it to a fault in Google's internal artificial intelligence.

In March 2024, Watson collaborated with Gavin Free of The Slow Mo Guys to film an episode of Technology Connections detailing the mechanics of Kodak and Sylvania's jointly developed Magicube, a multiple-use, disposable consumer flash bulb. Watson employed Free's Phantom high-speed camera to capture and study detailed close-ups of the Magicube igniting its explosive contents to create the flash. Because of the way the Phantom camera works, Free was forced to film several shots at an extreme aspect ratio to capture images at 200,000 frames per second.

== Recognition ==
Technology Connections has received praise from various publications for the depth and insight of Watson's research, as well as the wittiness of his scripts and breadth of his subject matter. Mark Frauenfelder, the co-owner of Boing Boing, called Watson's channel "a fantastic resource for learning about the inner workings of everyday items ... break[ing] down complex concepts into easy-to-understand explanations, providing viewers with a greater appreciation for the technology that surrounds them". Lifehacker's Michelle Ehrhardt wrote that Watson's "documentary style approach is comprehensive yet approachable, and while topics often have some bearing on what you have in your house right now, the channel has also done LGR Oddware-style breakdowns on odd trends or gadgets that aren't really around anymore". Ehrhardt called Watson "a sort of guru for home appliances", "explain[ing] the history and methodology behind common devices like air conditioners, dishwashers, and power outlets in a genuinely fun way that might also teach you a few tricks and tips that will make your life better". Adam Juniper, writing in Digital Camera World, called Watson and Free's video on the Magicube "a brilliant job of placing the different single-use flash technologies in context—historically and economically—showing how they work and then going above and beyond in explaining exactly how they work". Watson's video on the automatic Sunbeam Radiant toaster went viral in 2019, with Sean Hollister of The Verge praising it as "[possibly] the smartest thing you watch today". Hollister similarly praised Watson's video detailing the mechanics of the popcorn button present on most consumer microwaves.

The channel has also received praise from academics. The media studies scholar Marek Jancovic called Watson's video on the famous ringer of the Western Electric Model 500 telephone—in which Watson deduces that modern feature films still use a sample of the ring derived from a sound effect LP record pressed off-center and severely warped—an example of what Jancovic calls "media epigraphy". Jancovic wrote that Watson's findings represent "impressive deductions [w]orthy of a detective novel". Dan MacIsaac, a professor of physics at Buffalo State University, has praised Watson's explainers on home wiring, calling some of the concepts discussed illuminating, particularly on the details of plug design, electrical outlet orientation, North American home wiring, and the dangers of certain extension cords. MacIsaac recommended some Technology Connections videos as supplementary material for his introduction electromagnetism course.

In 2023, Watson published a video on the lack of use of brake lights in some electric vehicles during regenerative braking. He demonstrated that his 2022 Hyundai Ioniq 5 could decelerate sharply to a complete stop without actuating the brake lights. The video went viral, amassing over two million views in a week, prompting a detailed report of these flaws in Consumer Reports, which in turn prompted a response from Hyundai Motor Group promising to address the issue.

== Personal life ==
Watson is a resident of the Chicago metropolitan area. He has a degree in hotel management and previously worked in the hotel industry. He is an enthusiast of electric cars, a topic covered repeatedly on his channel, with his first electric vehicle being a Chevrolet Volt purchased in 2015 to commute to his first day job. In 2022, he purchased a Hyundai Ioniq 5.
