= Larry Bright =

Convicted American serial killer

- Born: Larry Dean Bright; July 8, 1966 (age 60); Peoria County, Illinois, U.S.
- Other name: "The Bonecrusher"
- Convictions: Murder (eight counts); Theft; Burglary
- Penalty: Life imprisonment (eight life terms)

Details
- Victims: 8+
- Span of crimes: 2003–2004
- Country: United States
- States: Illinois, possibly elsewhere
- Date apprehended: January 20, 2005
- Imprisoned at: Big Muddy River Correctional Center

Larry Dean Bright (born July 8, 1966), also known as The Bonecrusher, is an American serial killer responsible for the deaths of at least eight women between the ages of 30 and 41 in central Illinois. The murders occurred between July 2003 and October 2004, in Peoria and Tazewell County, Illinois. His nickname derives from his purported propensity for burning his victims' bodies before crushing their bone fragments with a hammer. After confessing to his crimes in May 2005, Bright was convicted of eight counts of murder and sentenced to eight life sentences without the possibility of parole.

== Biography ==
Not long after 2000, Bright began to spend a great deal of free time around sex workers, taking particular interest in African-American women.

== Exposure ==
Between March 2001 and October 15, 2004, the bodies of six women were found in rural areas around the Illinois counties of Peoria and Tazewell, and four other women were reported missing from the area. In October 2004, the Peoria City Police Department formed a task force of 13 police officers, with input from the Illinois State Police, and neighboring law enforcement agencies, to investigate the cases. Bright came under suspicion that December, after police arrested 35-year-old sex worker Vickie Bomar for theft. While residing in the county jail, the woman offered to help investigators in exchange for a plea bargain.

Bomar claimed that, in July, a client named Larry Bright lured her into the outbuilding of his mother's home, where he lived. After sharing alcohol and drugs, Bright attacked her, and attempted to rape her at knifepoint, but Bomar managed to escape after a struggle. Since the alleged incident occurred five months prior to her arrest, authorities questioned the legitimacy of her statement. Bomar claimed that she was afraid to report the incident earlier, as she had failed to appear in court on other charges, which officers later confirmed when checking her criminal history. While investigating the suspect, investigators became aware of at least six similar cases during which Bright had displayed aggressive behavior, particularly towards African-American sex workers.

Bright was detained and interrogated in late December, whereupon he was told that he could be charged with illegal deprivation of liberty under aggravated circumstances. He refused to cooperate with officers and denied the charges, and was released shortly after due to a lack of evidence. The district attorney was granted a search warrant on January 20, 2005, allowing investigators to search Bright's property for potential evidence. During this search, police attention was drawn to several plots of excavated land, which Bright's mother claimed originated when she and her son removed several raspberry bushes. When digging through the area, however, officers found ashes and many small bone fragments. Based on this evidence, Bright was temporarily detained in the Tazewell County Jail. After forensic examination determined that the bone fragments were human in origin, Bright was charged with murder, and the prosecutor ordered his house excavated. Not long after, Bright confessed to the murder of eight women.

== Victims ==
Bright's first known victim was 30-year-old Sabrina Payne, whom he had picked up on the outskirts of Peoria. He offered her money in exchange for sex, and drove Payne to his house. During his interrogation, Bright claimed that he had no memory of how he killed Payne, as he was intoxicated at the time, but the autopsy implied strangulation. After the murder, he loaded the body in his SUV and took it to a cornfield outside Tremont, where it was discovered on July 27, 2003.

In early August 2004, Bright met 33-year-old prostitute Laura Lollar, and offered her money in exchange for sexual services. He strangled Lollar during intercourse and burned her body in the backyard to dispose of any evidence. In January 2005, he identified her from a photograph presented to him.

In late September, Bright met 40-year-old prostitute Linda K. Neal in the parking lot of a Peoria furniture store. He offered her drugs in exchange for sex, to which Neal agreed. As with previous victims, Bright took her to his house, where they took crack cocaine before engaging in intercourse. After Neal fell asleep, Larry strangled her. Because his mother was at home, he decided to dispose of the body away from the house. Bright took the body to Tazewell County, where he discarded it on the roadside, leaving traces from a shoelace on her neck. In conducting the autopsy, the coroner found biological evidence from a male perpetrator in the victim's body. After Bright's arrest, several cigarette butts were taken from his home and sent for DNA profiling, where it was found to match the DNA of Neal's killer.

Bright's last confirmed murder took place on October 14, 2004, when he killed 41-year-old Brenda Erving. During the interrogation, Bright claimed that he had no memory of the woman's name or where they had met, but that he took her to his house, they took drugs for about an hour, and then engaged in intercourse before he attacked her. He admitted that Erving was particularly strong and resisted fiercely, nearly rendering him unconscious. She nearly managed to run away, but was unable to open the door and leave the building, which enabled Bright to strike her several times in the back of the head. Once she was immobilized, he strangled her to death. While still intoxicated, Bright intended to dispose of Erving's body in a nearby lake, but he became disoriented and instead discarded of the corpse near a dairy farm in Peoria County instead, where it was found shortly after.

== Trial ==
As part of his plea bargain and full confession, Bright was spared the death penalty. On May 30, 2006, he was sentenced to eight terms of life in prison, without the possibility of parole.

During his court hearings, Bright confessed to additional murders in Wisconsin, Oklahoma, Washington, and Arizona, but later retracted his statements. He also expressed that he contemplated suicide on multiple occasions, but that he never followed through due to his religious beliefs. Bright also admitted that he intended to attack the arresting officers with knives so that they would shoot him, but he refrained because his mother was at the scene.

While some investigators proposed racism as the primary motive for Bright's killings, he denied this, instead giving several explanations for his motives. At first, he claimed that he developed a misogynistic view of African-American women after contracting HIV/AIDS from a sex worker. When he tested negative for the virus, this explanation was questioned. Later, Bright claimed that, as a 19-year-old boy serving a prison sentence, he was sexually abused on multiple occasions by African-American prisoners, and developed an urge to punish Black men for causing him harm. As he was not sexually attracted to men, in later years he claimed that his hatred shifted to focus on female sex workers.

== See also ==
- List of serial killers in the United States
