= Garth Watson =

English cricketer and headmaster

Personal information
- Full name: Alexander Garth MacLaren Watson
- Born: 27 February 1945 (age 81); Lucknow, Uttar Pradesh, British Raj
- Batting: Left-handed
- Bowling: Right-arm fast-medium

Domestic team information
- Years: Team
- 1965–1968: Oxford University
- 1973–1979: Dorset

Career statistics
Competition	FC	LA
Matches	42	1
Runs scored	666	2
Batting average	13.05	2.00
100s/50s	0/1	0/0
Top score	65*	2
Balls bowled	5,160	72
Wickets	68	3
Bowling average	39.82	13.00
5 wickets in innings	1	0
10 wickets in match	0	–
Best bowling	5/44	3/39
Catches/stumpings	14/–	1/–
- Source: ESPNcricinfo, 17 March 2010

Alexander Garth MacLaren Watson (born 27 February 1945) is an English former cricketer who became a school headmaster. He was a right-arm fast-medium bowler and left-handed lower-order batsman.

Watson was born in India and educated at St Lawrence College, Ramsgate, and Corpus Christi College, Oxford. He made his first-class debut for Oxford University against Gloucestershire in 1965 and made in total 41 first-class appearances for the university, his final match coming in the 1968 University Match against Cambridge University. He won cricket Blues in 1965, 1966, and 1968.

Watson took 68 wickets for the university at a bowling average of 39.38, with best figures of 5 for 44 against Cambridge University in 1965. He scored 666 runs at a batting average of 13.05, with a top score of 65* against Essex in 1966. He took 14 catches. He also played a first-class match for Oxford and Cambridge Universities against the touring Australians in 1968.

In 1973 Watson played his only List-A match, for Dorset against Staffordshire in the 1973 Gillette Cup. He took 3 wickets for 39 runs. During the same season he made his Minor Counties Championship debut for Dorset against Berkshire. From 1973 to 1979 he played 22 Minor Counties matches for Dorset. He played club cricket for the Dorset Rangers from the 1970s to the 1990s.

Watson was head of Dumpton School in Wimborne, Dorset, from 1976 to 2005.
