= Eddie Lee Sexton =

American murderer

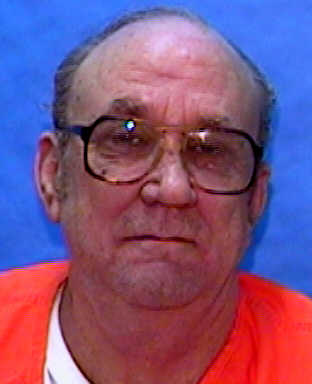
Eddie Lee Sexton

Eddie Lee Sexton (May 12, 1942 – December 29, 2010) was an American convicted murderer and rapist known for compelling his children to murder and for committing sexual abuse against his own family, which he ruled in a cult-like manner. He fathered at least three children with two of his daughters. Rick Terrana, Eddie Sexton's defense attorney, described the Sextons as the "most dysfunctional family in America." The case earned national attention, partly because of some of the graphic and sensational details revealed in court.

Eddie Lee Sexton was captured after living as a fugitive for over a year to avoid child-abuse charges. He was sentenced to death for orchestrating the murder of his son-in-law Joel by holding a gun to the head of his own son Willie and ordering him to strangle Joel. Sexton was also given an additional 15 years for conspiracy to commit kidnapping and murder of an acquaintance. After appeal, Sexton's death-penalty case was overturned and a new trial ordered. After retrial he was again found guilty and sentenced to death, but died in prison of natural causes.

== Biography ==
=== Early life ===
Eddie Lee Sexton was born near rural Logan, West Virginia to a family of coal miners. His father was a part-time Baptist preacher. In 1963, he committed armed robbery of a gas station the day after marrying his pregnant 15-year-old girlfriend. He was sentenced to five years in state prison for the robbery, and his wife filed for divorce after giving birth to their son Patrick. Eddie later married Estella May, with whom he had 12 children. Eddie and Estella settled in Stark County, Ohio.

Eddie was regarded as charming and polite upon first impression, but those who knew him well saw him as a serial con artist and fraudster. Though receiving Social Security disability payments due to an allegedly serious back injury, he also worked for cash as a painter and handyman. He was suspected of having committed insurance fraud by setting three fires at his homes in the 1980s and faking burglaries and falsely reporting stolen items.

In the 1970s he briefly worked as an independent Christian preacher, espousing a highly unorthodox doctrine emphasizing sex and apocalyptic predictions that he would later use to indoctrinate and intimidate his children. Journalist Lowell Cauffiel wrote: "Eddie Lee Sexton certainly maintained his own place of worship. But nobody could figure out what gospel he was preaching. A little general occult. A little fundamentalism. A little Devil Worship. A little sci-fi hustle..." Neighbor Augusta Houston would report that Eddie claimed to worship both God and the Devil.

=== Abuse and investigations ===
The Sexton children would later describe Eddie and Estella as having committed extreme acts of abuse almost daily. All the children were sexually abused by both parents and beaten and locked in their rooms for minor infractions, and they routinely suffered other indignities. The Sexton children attended public schools, and while Eddie allowed them to have only one friend each, they were not allowed to visit friends' homes and friends were not allowed in the Sexton home. The Sexton children believed that their father had supernatural powers such as telepathy and the ability to summon ghosts or spirits.

Subsequent to the abuse, many of the children became sexually reactive with or sexually abusive toward one another. Eddie staged mock wedding ceremonies with several of his daughters as preludes to his raping them (photos of these weddings are printed in Cauffiel's book House of Secrets, with Eddie's daughters wearing bridal veils in their family living room). His children would later report Eddie conducting such events as a seance-like ceremony involving a dead cat and forcing the children to sign contracts in their own blood stating they would go to hell for disobeying him.

Eddie impregnated his teenage daughter Estella (named after her mother but known as "Pixie"). He encouraged her to find a boyfriend to avert suspicion from himself. Pixie met Joel Good, a high-school classmate described as slow-witted and overly trusting. They had an on/off romance and eventually married despite his family's reservations about him marrying a young mother of two baby daughters, Dawn and Shasta, of uncertain parentage. After the wedding, Pixie gave birth to a boy they named Skipper Lee Good.

The Sexton household was long suspected of being abusive and neglectful towards their children; county officials maintained a file on the family from 1979 but lacked enough evidence for any further action. In early 1992, his then-18-year-old daughter Machelle informed employees at a women's shelter that her father had raped her. At the time of Machelle's allegation, six of the Sexton children were minors and authorities launched an investigation. Three of the young children reported nothing unusual, but three others reported physical abuse by their parents. These three children were removed from the home and assigned to foster families pending further investigation. Machelle retracted her allegations, complicating the case.

Eddie filmed a three-hour video on a VHS tape, denying the charges against him and claiming he was the victim of persecution by both his brother Otis, who had cooperated with authorities, and Stark County authorities who held a grudge against him. To plead his case, Eddie mailed copies of the video directly to both President Bill Clinton and Attorney General Janet Reno.

=== Fugitives ===
After seven months with her foster family, young Lana Sexton confided to her foster parents that her birth mother Estella had sexually abused her. This disclosure was confirmed by a medical exam that found vaginal scarring consistent with her story. Stark County authorities moved to take custody of all the minor Sexton children. Eddie and Estella responded first with a flurry of legal motions designed to slow the court process, then tried to prove Native American ancestry in an attempt to shift the criminal case to a tribal court.

When these steps were ineffective in avoiding court action, the Sextons went on the run. Eddie and Estella traveled with three of their minor children, several adult children including Pixie with Joel, and Pixie's three young children. In total, 11 people lived in a cramped van as they roamed the country. They first lived in Oklahoma with Eddie's relatives for several months before relocating to campsites at Little Manatee River State Park on Florida’s western coast. Eddie forced the children to engage in paramilitary drills in anticipation of a showdown with law enforcement, and the Sexton children began drinking heavily and inhaling gasoline fumes. Eddie drove back to Ohio every two weeks to cash his disability checks. Ohio courts issued arrest warrants, but the case had a relatively low priority and was not initially well-publicized due to family court rules to protect the anonymity of child-abuse victims.

Pixie smothered her son Skipper to death in the late evening of October 19, 1993 or the early morning of October 20, 1993; he was ill and Eddie refused him medical attention. Pixie later claimed that her father ordered her to silence the crying child to avoid drawing attention at the campsite, where they were living in violation of both the occupancy and time-limit rules. Pixie carried the corpse with her for several days, believing that her father had the power to resurrect the child. They eventually buried him in a peat bog near the campsite.

Pixie told Joel the boy died of Sudden Infant Death Syndrome (SIDS), but Joel was suspicious. On November 30, 1993, Joel and Pixie visited the University of Tampa’s library, where librarian Gail Novak helped him find information about SIDS. Eddie entered the library, furious that Joel and Pixie were there without his permission. Novak would later testify that she saw Eddie assault Joel and Pixie in the library and overheard an argument between father and daughter: When Pixie said that Joel was heartbroken over Skipper's death and wanted to go back to Ohio, Eddie replied that the only way Joel would return to Ohio was as a corpse. Novak reported the incident to campus police, who dismissed it as a prank.

At Little Manatee State Park, the Sextons made the acquaintance of Ray Hesser, who had recently retired after selling his business and was traveling cross-country by himself in a luxurious motor home. Eddie and his children began a scheme to use Pixie to seduce Hesser, hoping to eventually kill the man, drain his bank accounts, and steal his vehicle. Initially friendly towards the Sextons, Hesser gradually grew suspicious and parted ways with them by lying about his travel plans specifically to avoid them.

Eddie trained his hulking adult son Willie to use a garotte in preparation for murdering Joel. Willie strangled 24-year-old Joel to death sometime between Thanksgiving and Christmas 1993. They buried Joel's body in the swamp not far from Skipper's grave.

=== Arrest and trials ===
Eventually, the FBI issued a national arrest warrant for Eddie and Estella Sexton for unlawful flight to avoid prosecution. They were arrested in Florida on January 14, 1994 after authorities traced them by a Florida zip code on one of Sexton's self-produced videocassettes that was mailed to Attorney General Reno.

The minor Sexton children were taken into custody while the adult children were released. Investigation and questioning would reveal that there were other crimes to be investigated beyond the child abuse warrants for Eddie and Estella. Pixie's daughters Dawn and Shasta both showed signs of repeated sexual abuse, and Dawn identified Willie and Scott Sexton as her abusers. Interviews uncovered Skipper's death, which was first blamed on SIDS, though eventually Pixie took responsibility for it.

All of the Sextons initially insisted that Joel had departed for Ohio, but eventually Willie confessed to killing him at Eddie's command. Authorities found the bodies of Skipper and Joel where they had been buried; they were unintentionally well-preserved in unusually good condition in peat, similar to the bog bodies of northern Europe.

The investigation was exceptionally complex, headquartered in Hillsborough County, Florida, but spanning several states and multiple jurisdictions. Sexton's children were difficult to interview, giving evasive and contradictory answers and all displaying major psychiatric problems like psychotic breaks, PTSD, and vivid nightmares about their father. Machelle agreed to testify against her father, saying that she retracted her confession out of fear, but now felt comfortable testifying since he was in custody. His adult daughter Sherri Crotto reported that he had impregnated her several years before doing the same to Pixie, and that relatives had adopted her son. DNA testing confirmed with 99% likelihood that Eddie was the father of Pixie's daughters Dawn and Shasta. Authorities suspected that he might have also fathered Skipper, but they opted against DNA testing for the sake of Joel's family: Joel was consistently reported to have adored Skipper and the two were buried in the same casket.

Eventually, investigators came to believe that Eddie was the mastermind of the entire Sexton family. In February 1994, Pixie was charged with first-degree murder for killing Skipper. However, she was later allowed to plead guilty to manslaughter for Skipper's death, in exchange for testifying against her father. Adult son Scott agreed to testify against Eddie regarding the Hesser murder plot, while Willie agreed to testify regarding Joel Good’s murder. Willie was found to have a borderline mentally handicapped IQ (about 70) and was functionally illiterate. He was further judged unfit to stand trial due to serious psychiatric problems and was ordered to a mental-health facility for treatment. His condition was stabilized and he eventually testified.

The first trial was for the murder plot against Ray Hesser. Eddie eventually accepted a plea bargain and was sentenced to 15 years for conspiracy to commit kidnapping and murder.

The next trial was for the murder of Joel Good. Prosecutor Jay Pruner stated in court: “Each of [Eddie's] children represented a key that would unlock a door to a different secret [...] To keep those family secrets sacred, Eddie Lee Sexton exercised complete domination and control over every member of his family.” Willie testified that Eddie had ordered Joel’s murder due to fears that he would return to Ohio and report Skipper's death and the Sexton family whereabouts to authorities. Defense attorneys noted the many contradictions and inconsistencies in the Sexton children’s testimony and depositions and attempted to cast Willie and Pixie as the murderers, asserting that Eddie wasn’t involved and did not approve of the crime. Rick Terrana objected to the information about Eddie's prior bad acts being heard in court. Judge Bob Mitcham ruled that such testimony would be evaluated on a case-by-case basis, but ended up allowing most testimony of Eddie's abusive and manipulative behavior. Judge Mitcham's memoir described Eddie as "look[ing] continually relaxed and in control throughout the trial."

Eddie was found guilty after less than three hours of deliberation and was sentenced to death on November 2, 1994. Jurors later said that librarian Gail Novak's testimony was the most important evidence presented at the trial. While the Sextons came across as mentally disturbed and their stories were often inconsistent, contradictory, and incomplete, Novak's account provided jurors with critical independent corroboration of the most salient details of the prosecution’s case.

Pixie was sentenced to six years for manslaughter. Willie pled guilty to second-degree murder and was sentenced to 25 years, with his low intelligence and overbearing father taken as mitigating factors. In the Ohio courts, Estella May was sentenced to two years in prison for abusing Lana; during a second trial for over a dozen abuse charges against other children, she was sentenced to life in prison for accessory to rape.

On appeal in 1997, Eddie Lee Sexton's verdict was overturned and a new trial was ordered. The appellate judges agreed with defense attorneys that some of the prior bad acts evidence regarding the child abuse and other lurid details of the family history were prejudicial and inflammatory. After the retrial Eddie was again found guilty. During the sentencing phase, a psychologist testified for the defense that Eddie "had a diminished level of self-control due to dysfunction in his prefrontal cortex". The court rejected this line of reasoning, noting that Eddie's crimes showed considerable planning and concealment over many years, thus demonstrating he possessed self-control. Moreover, Dr. Barbara Stein, a board-certified psychiatrist retained by the State before the second trial, testified at the evidentiary hearing that Sexton had antisocial personality disorder with histrionic features. Dr. Michael Maher, a forensic psychiatrist, concluded that Sexton was a "sadistic sexual psychopath." Eddie was sentenced to death on November 18, 1998. He died of natural causes while imprisoned at Florida's Union Correctional Institution.

In October 2017, Estella May Warren died in prison of natural causes at age 70.

Pixie Sexton's murder of her young child has been described as an extreme example of post-partum depression, with research showing that victims of abuse have much higher than average rates of killing their own children.
