= Alexander Wayne Watson =

American serial killer

- Born: Alexander Wayne Watson, Jr. September 24, 1969 (age 57); Anne Arundel County, Maryland, U.S.
- Conviction: First degree murder (6 counts)
- Penalty: Life imprisonment without parole

Details
- Victims: 4
- Span of crimes: 1986–1994
- Country: United States
- State: Maryland
- Date apprehended: 1994
- Imprisoned at: North Branch Correctional Institution

Alexander Wayne Watson Jr. (born September 24, 1969) is an American serial killer. Initially convicted and sentenced to life imprisonment for the 1994 murder of a woman in Forestville, Maryland, Watson's DNA was later matched to three additional killings in Anne Arundel County committed years before. For these crimes, he pleaded guilty and received four additional life imprisonment terms.

== Murders ==
The first murder occurred on October 8, 1986, when 34-year-old mother of two Boontem Anderson was killed in her Gambrills home. On that day, she was on sick leave from her job at Fort Meade, with her nude body being found by her fiancé's 11-year-old son in the bathtub. She had been sexually assaulted, stabbed and strangled to death. Watson, a minor at the time, lived only a couple of miles away, and was acquainted with the family via their son, with whom he worked at a fast-food restaurant.

On May 23, 1988, 37-year-old Mary Elaine Shereika was out on an early morning jog before going to work, but failed to appear at her workplace. Her fiancé reported her missing, and later in the day, a Gambrills farmer plowing his rye field found her partially clothed body. She had been raped, stabbed and finally strangled, with a bloodied sock found next to the body. Like with the Anderson case, Watson lived close to her and was acquainted with the victim. On that morning, while he was using drugs at the park, Shereika passed by him. Deciding that he could get away with murder a second time, he caught up with her, dragged her to the field and proceeded to kill Mary.

By the early 1990s, Watson married and had a child, moving with his family to the Southgate apartment complex in Glen Burnie. On January 15, 1993, 14-year-old Lisa Kathleen Haenel, a ninth-grade student at the local Old Mill High School, vanished while walking her usual path to school. The girl was reported missing by her mother and a search was initiated, with the mother's boyfriend finding Lisa's body ditched in a ravine behind the school's premises the following morning. She was almost completely nude except for a sock, with stab wounds and strangulation marks on her body. Unlike the previous victims, Haenel was not sexually assaulted, so seminal fluid could not be collected, but the killer's DNA was still obtained via an unsmoked Newport-brand cigarette found close to the body, which had traces of Lisa's blood on the burn end and saliva from the murderer at the other.

On June 13, 1994, Watson committed his last murder, killing 37-year-old office manager Debra Cobb during a robbery of her workplace in Forestville. He was arrested as a suspect not long after, as he worked in the same office plaza, pleading guilty to first-degree murder at his trial, blaming his addiction to crack cocaine for the brutal crime. Receiving a life imprisonment sentence in December 1994, he was sent to the Jessup Correctional Institution, without being connected to the other killings until over a decade later.

== Exposure ==
Using the advancements in DNA technology, the evidence collected for the three crime scenes was entered into CODIS, and in due time, the samples linked back to Watson. In 2004, he was charged with the three killings, and at his 2007 trial, he pleaded guilty to all of charges to avoid a possible death sentence. When queried about any other crimes he might have committed, Watson denied it, saying that only these were his doing. He was sentenced to four additional life imprisonment terms, to be served concurrently with his previous one, and he was moved to the North Branch Correctional Institution, where he remains incarcerated.

== See also ==
- List of serial killers in the United States
