= Lowell Cauffiel =

American novelist

- Born: Lowell Joseph Cauffiel; Michigan, U.S.
- Education: Wayne State University
- Occupations: Journalist; author; screenwriter
- Children: 2, including Jessica Cauffiel
- Writing career
- Language: English
- Genres: Non-fiction, fiction
- Subject: Crime
- Notable works: House of Secrets (1997); Masquerade (1988)
- Website: lowellcauffiel.com

Lowell Joseph Cauffiel is an American true crime author, novelist, screenwriter and film and television producer.

== Life and career ==
Cauffiel was born in Michigan, the son of Ursula Irene (née Zulka), a Polish-American community leader, and Lowell Cauffiel, an aeronautical engineer and entrepreneur. A journalism graduate of Wayne State University, Cauffiel began his writing career as a contributor to music magazines, including Rolling Stone, Creem and Guitar Player. He went on to become an award-winning reporter with the Detroit News and Detroit Monthly Magazine.

Cauffiel began his bookwriting career in 1988 with Masquerade: A True Story of Seduction, Compulsion and Murder. That title and the 1997 New York Times bestseller House of Secrets have appeared on critics' lists of the best works in American true crime. Thematically, Cauffiel's books often explore how people embrace popular trends and exalt American values to hide their own dark intentions and destructive acts.

In the mid-1990s, Cauffiel wrote three fiction titles. He performed as a blues guitarist with the Progressive Blues Band in Motor City nightclubs and concerts.

The New York Times 1988 review called Cauffiel's book Masquerade an "excellent account of one man's flirtation with a twilight zone of his own making."

In 2002, Cauffiel began writing and producing crime documentaries. In 2003, he relocated from Michigan to Los Angeles to write for film and create series television. He's developed film and television projects with, among others, Billy Crystal, David Schwimmer, Michael Medavoy, Kiefer Sutherland, Kathryn Morris and Michael Douglas. In 2023, Arcade Crime Wise published Cauffiel's first book in more than two decades, the crime novel Below the Line,which Cauffiel says is loosely based on his experiences with Detroit homicide detectives and the rigors of the film and television industry.

Cauffiel is a surfer and motorcyclist. He has worked in alcohol and drug rehabilitation as a volunteer and headed a research grant about alcohol problems among young people for the National Institute on Alcohol Abuse and Alcoholism (NIAAA) for the National Institutes of Health. He's the co-founder of Primary Purpose Productions, a non-profit production company that creates short films about addicts and alcoholics in recovery. Cauffiel's directing debut with Primary Purpose, Men In A Box, starring Kurtwood Smith, was a selection at several American film festivals.

His daughter is actress Jessica Cauffiel. His son, John, under the stage name Johnny Coolati, is the lead guitarist and singer for the Brooklyn-based rock trio Call of the Wild, signed to Kemado Records.

== Novels ==
- Dark Rage (1997) Kensington Pub. Corp., New York ISBN 978-0-78600-355-6
- Marker (1997) St. Martin's Press, New York ISBN 978-0-31215-583-4
- Toss (1998) (with Boomer Esiason) Dutton, New York ISBN 978-0-52594-429-4
- Below the Line (2023) Arcade Crime Wise, New York ISBN 978-1-956763-48-5

== Non-fiction ==
- Masquerade; a true story of seduction, compulsion, and murder (1988) Doubleday, New York ISBN 978-0-38523-772-7
- Forever and Five Days (1992) Kensington Pub. Corp., New York ISBN 978-0-821737-10-1
- The Bobbitt Case — You Decide (1994) under pseudonym Peter Kane, Pinnacle, New York ISBN 978-0-78600-060-9
- Eye of the Beholder (1994) Kensington Pub. Corp., New York ISBN 978-0-82174-614-1
- House of Secrets (1998) the Eddie Lee Sexton case, Kensington Pub. Corp., New York ISBN 978-1-57566-221-3

== Filmography ==
- Prison Boot Camp (2002) (TV) (writer, producer)
- Love Behind Bars (2003) (TV) (writer, producer)
- Bed Ridden (2009) (film) (writer, producer)
- Men in a Box (2012) (film) (director, writer, producer)
- Plan B (2012) (film) (producer)
- Fire With Fire (2012) (writer, uncredited)
- Stockholm (2019) (film) (executive producer)
