= Pepper Jelly Festival =

- Dates: Last Saturday in April
- Locations: Thomaston, Alabama
- Coordinates: 32.27139°N 87.62633°W
- Country: United States
- Years active: 40
- Founded: 1986
- Attendance: ~6000
- Website: Pepper Jelly Festival

The Pepper Jelly Festival and Rural Heritage Day, commonly known as the Pepper Jelly Festival, is an annual festival held the last Saturday in April in the Black Belt town of Thomaston, Alabama. The festival is hosted at the Alabama Rural Heritage Center, which is located in the old home economics building on the former Marengo County High School campus that was redesigned and repurposed by Auburn University's Rural Studio. The Pepper Jelly Festival is a celebration of rural life and traditions in western Alabama. Formerly named Rural Fun Day, the event was renamed in recognition of the unique pepper jelly made at the Rural Heritage Center. The festival features music, homemade food, art, crafts, entertainment, and other activities that reflect the culture of a rural Southern way of life. The festival is historically the second-largest held every year in Marengo County, behind Christmas on the River in Demopolis.

There was no event in 2020 as the COVID-19 pandemic was to blame; the 35th is deferred to 2021.
