= Herbert Jones (basketball) =

American basketball player (born 1998)

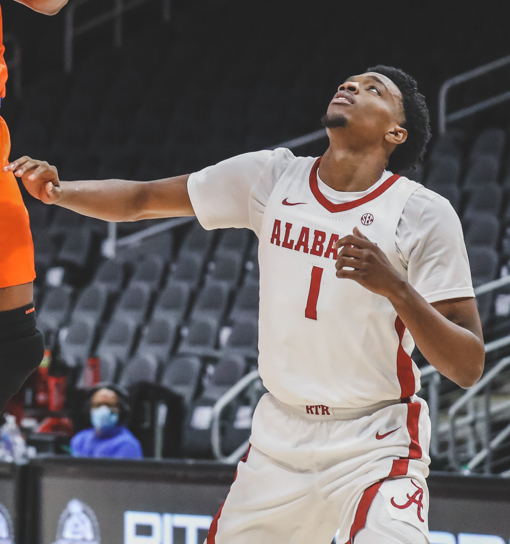
- Jones with Alabama in 2020

No. 2 – New Orleans Pelicans
- Position: Small forward
- League: NBA

Personal information
- Born: October 6, 1998 (age 28) Greensboro, Alabama, U.S.
- Listed height: 6 ft 7 in (2.01 m)
- Listed weight: 210 lb (95 kg)

Career information
- High school: Sunshine (Newbern, Alabama); Hale County (Moundville, Alabama)
- College: Alabama (2017–2021)
- NBA draft: 2021: 2nd round, 35th overall pick
- Drafted by: New Orleans Pelicans
- Playing career: 2021–present

Career history
- 2021–present: New Orleans Pelicans

Career highlights
- NBA All-Defensive First Team (2024); NBA All-Rookie Second Team (2022); Third-team All-American – AP, SN (2021); SEC Player of the Year (2021); First-team All-SEC (2021); SEC Defensive Player of the Year (2021); 2× SEC All-Defensive Team (2020, 2021)
- Stats at NBA.com
- Stats at Basketball Reference

Herbert Keyshawn Jones (born October 6, 1998) is an American professional basketball player for the New Orleans Pelicans of the National Basketball Association (NBA). He played college basketball for the Alabama Crimson Tide. He earned third-team All-American honors as a senior in 2021, when he was also named the SEC Player of the Year.

Jones was named to the NBA All-Rookie Second Team in 2022 and NBA All-Defensive First Team in 2024.

== High school career ==
Jones started playing varsity basketball as a seventh-grader for Sunshine High School in Newbern, Alabama, where his father served as the head coach. He played alongside his older brother, Walter Jr., and helped his team reach the Class 1A state finals in 2015, before the school closed. For his junior season, Jones transferred to Hale County High School in nearby Moundville, Alabama, following his father, who was an assistant coach. As a senior, he averaged 16.6 points, 8.2 rebounds and four assists, earning Class 4A Player of the Year honors. Jones led Hale County to the 4A state championship, its first-ever state title. He committed to playing college basketball at Alabama over offers from Auburn, Georgia, Georgia Tech and Florida.

== College career ==
As a freshman at Alabama, Jones averaged 4.2 points and 3.5 rebounds per game. He drew a single-season program record 23 charges. In his sophomore season, he averaged 6.4 points and 3.5 rebounds per game. On January 29, 2020, during a game against LSU, Jones suffered a fractured left wrist and underwent surgery three days later. He returned to action on February 12 while wearing a cast on his wrist. In his next game, after three days, Jones recorded six points and 17 rebounds in an 88–82 win over LSU. Late in the game, he made two free throws using only his right hand, due to his injury. As a junior, Jones averaged 7.9 points, 6.4 rebounds and 2.3 assists per game and was a Southeastern Conference (SEC) All-Defensive Team selection. He declared for the 2020 NBA draft before withdrawing and returning to college.

At the close of the 2020–21 regular season, Jones was named the SEC Player of the Year and Defensive Player of the Year by the league's coaches. As a senior, he averaged 11.2 points, 6.6 rebounds, 3.3 assists, 1.7 steals and 1.1 blocks per game. On April 8, 2021, Jones declared for the 2021 NBA draft, forgoing his extra year of college eligibility.

== Professional career ==
Jones was selected in the second round of the 2021 NBA draft with the 35th pick by the New Orleans Pelicans. On December 28, 2021, Jones scored a then career-high 26 points in a 108–104 win against the Cleveland Cavaliers. On March 27, 2022, he had a career-high six steals in a 116–108 win over the Los Angeles Lakers. Jones was selected to the NBA All-Rookie second team. On April 5, 2023, Jones put up a career-high 35 points to go with five made three-pointers. Following the season, Jones became a restricted free agent and re-signed with New Orleans to a four-year, $54 million contract. On May 21, 2024, Jones was named to the NBA All-Defensive First Team, as the only non-center to be included. Jones made 20 starts for New Orleans during the 2024–25 NBA season, averaging 10.3 points, 3.9 rebounds, and 3.3 assists. On January 10, 2025, Jones was ruled out indefinitely after suffering a torn posterior labrum in his right shoulder. On February 12, Jones was ruled out for the remainder of the season after undergoing successful shoulder surgery. On July 14, 2025, Jones agreed to a three-year, $68 million contract extension with New Orleans.

== Career statistics ==
Legend
GP	Games played	GS	Games started	MPG	Minutes per game
FG%	Field goal percentage	3P%	3-point field goal percentage	FT%	Free throw percentage
RPG	Rebounds per game	APG	Assists per game	SPG	Steals per game
BPG	Blocks per game	PPG	Points per game	**Bold**	Career high

=== NBA ===
==== Regular season ====
Year	Team	GP	GS	MPG	FG%	3P%	FT%	RPG	APG	SPG	BPG	PPG
2021–22	New Orleans	**78**	69	29.9	.476	.337	.840	3.8	2.1	1.7	**.8**	9.5
2022–23	New Orleans	66	66	29.6	.469	.335	.764	**4.1**	2.5	1.6	.6	9.8
2023–24	New Orleans	76	**76**	30.5	**.498**	**.418**	**.867**	3.6	2.6	1.4	**.8**	**11.0**
2024–25	New Orleans	20	20	**32.4**	.436	.306	.825	3.9	**3.3**	**1.9**	.5	10.3
2025–26	New Orleans	56	56	28.4	.383	.309	.806	3.4	2.8	1.6	.5	8.9
Career		296	287	29.9	.458	.350	.822	3.7	2.5	1.6	.7	9.9

==== Playoffs ====
Year	Team	GP	GS	MPG	FG%	3P%	FT%	RPG	APG	SPG	BPG	PPG
2022	New Orleans	**6**	**6**	**37.7**	**.477**	**.417**	.773	3.3	1.8	**1.8**	**.8**	10.7
2024	New Orleans	4	4	35.2	.390	.333	**1.000**	**5.0**	**2.5**	1.3	.3	**13.0**
Career		10	10	36.7	.435	.361	.853	4.0	2.1	1.6	.6	11.6

=== College ===
Year	Team	GP	GS	MPG	FG%	3P%	FT%	RPG	APG	SPG	BPG	PPG
2017–18	Alabama	**35**	13	21.2	.408	.269	.500	3.5	1.4	1.3	.6	4.2
2018–19	Alabama	34	29	21.1	.422	.286	.495	3.5	2.0	0.9	0.6	6.4
2019–20	Alabama	27	26	26.5	**.484**	.071	.625	6.4	2.3	1.3	0.7	7.9
2020–21	Alabama	33	**33**	**27.3**	.446	**.351**	**.713**	**6.6**	**3.3**	**1.7**	**1.1**	**11.2**
Career		129	101	23.8	.441	.288	.604	4.9	2.2	1.3	.8	7.3

== Personal life ==
Jones is the son of Walter Sr. and Verlander Jones. He was born with hemolytic anemia. His older brother, Walter Jr., played college basketball for Texas–Rio Grande Valley and Alabama A&M.

Upon being drafted by the Pelicans, Jones is known for driving the same car every game as he did in his college days. Back then, he was also trying to save his money to help his family financially, by avoiding spending his own money, wearing the team's gear to every game.
