= Hale County High School =

School in Alabama, United States

Location
- 50 Wildcat Way; Moundville, Alabama 35474; United States
- 30.998853°N 87.620218°W

Information
- School district: Hale County Schools
- Principal: Ronnie Garner
- Teaching staff: 22.50 (on an FTE basis)
- Grades: 9-12
- Enrollment: 366 (2023-24)
- Student to teacher ratio: 16.27
- Colors: Black & Gold
- Mascot: Wildcats
- Website: hch.halek12.org

Hale County High School is a public high school in Moundville, Alabama serving about 360 students in Hale County, Alabama. The student body is predominantly African American and white. Wildcats are the school mascot. Black and gold are the school colors.

Its football team was established in 1913. In 2016 the school's softball team won its third straight 3A state championship. In, 2017 the basketball team won its first state championship. Herbert Jones, who played for the University of Alabama, was part of the team.

== Notable alumni ==
- Herbert Jones, professional NBA basketball player for the New Orleans Pelicans
