= Henry Watson =

Henry Watson may refer to:

- Henry Watson Jr. (1810–1891), American lawyer and planter
- Colonel Henry Watson (1737–1786), British military engineer
- Henry William Watson (1827–1903), British mathematician
- Henry Watson (1846-1911), British composer and collector of an extensive musical archive and musical instruments
- Henry Winfield Watson (1856–1933), Republican member of the U.S. House of Representatives from Pennsylvania
- H. B. Marriott Watson (1863–1921), Australian-born British novelist, journalist, playwright, and short-story writer
- Henry Holgate Watson (1867–1939), druggist and political figure in British Columbia
- Henry Keith Watson, member of the "L.A. Four", who participated in the beating of Reginald Denny during the 1992 Los Angeles riots
- Henry Sumner Watson (1866–1933), American artist
- Henry Watson (born 1813), former slave who recounted his experiences in Narrative of Henry Watson, A Fugitive Slave
- Henry Watson Powell (1733–1814), British officer during the Seven Years' War and American Revolutionary War

== See also ==
- Harry Watson (disambiguation)
- Henry Watson Fowler (1858–1933), English schoolmaster and lexicographer
