= Samuel Mockbee =

American architect (1944–2001)

- Born: December 23, 1944; Meridian, Mississippi
- Died: December 30, 2001 (aged 57)
- Occupation: Architect
- Spouse: Jackie
- Children: 4

Samuel Mockbee (December 23, 1944 – December 30, 2001) was an American architect and a co-founder of the Auburn University Rural Studio program in Hale County, Alabama. After establishing a regular architectural practice in his native Mississippi, Mockbee became interested in the design and construction problems associated with rural housing in Alabama and Mississippi. Soon after joining the faculty of Auburn, Mockbee established the Rural Studio with educator Dennis K. Ruth to provide practical training for architecture students in an environment where their efforts could address the problems of poverty and substandard housing in underserved areas of the southern United States. Mockbee went on to receive numerous awards for his work, including a MacArthur Foundation grant that he used to further the work of the Rural Studio.

== Early life, education and design practice ==
Mockbee was born on December 23, 1944, in Meridian, Mississippi, to Samuel Mockbee and Margaret Sale Berry Mockbee. His father, contracted tuberculosis when Mockbee was twelve, and was unable to work from that time until he died. Mockbee's father and mother both succumbed to cancer, as did his sister.

Mockbee served two years in the U.S. Army beginning in 1967. Following his discharge, he married Jacquelyn Johnson in 1970. He enrolled at Auburn University and graduated from the School of Architecture in 1974 with a Bachelor of Architecture degree. Mockbee worked in Columbus, Georgia before returning to Mississippi in 1977, where he formed a partnership with his classmate and friend, Tommy Goodman. A few years later he partnered with Coleman Coker, forming Mockbee/Coker. The firm's work in local vernacular attracted notice, and was recognized with a monograph published by the Architectural League of New York in 1990, followed in 1995 by Mockbee Coker: Thought and Process, published by the Princeton Architectural Press. Mockbee Coker's work emphasized local forms and materials, often with broadly-overhanging pitched roofs suited to the Mississippi and Alabama climate.

== Charity work and transition to academic instruction ==
In 1982 Mockbee became involved in renovating houses for Catholic charities in Madison County, Mississippi. An initial project, executed for $7,000, drew Mockbee into a plan for three new houses under the auspices of Madison Countians Allied Against Poverty. The project received an award from Progressive Architecture, but remained unbuilt for lack of funding. Instead, Mockbee began a series of paintings depicting local families that had experienced poverty, including the family of the woman who had nursed his cancer-stricken sister. Mockbee continued to paint and draw as an avocation, as he had since childhood.

By 1990 Mockbee had been hired as professor of architecture at Auburn University by Auburn architecture department chairman Dennis K. Ruth. Ruth initiated a focus on practical field work, including hands-on experience in construction, and supported Mockbee's initiative to work with students to restore a house in Opelika, Alabama in 1992.

== Rural Studio ==
Perry Lakes Canopy Tower by Rural Studio

Mockbee searched for a location in which to expand the program of working with architecture students to give them practical experience while actively addressing poverty and substandard housing. In order to remove students from the distractions of campus life and to fully immerse them in the rural environment, Mockbee and Ruth set up the Rural Studio in 1992 in Hale County, Alabama, about two hours' drive from Auburn, and between Mockbee's home in Canton, Mississippi and Auburn. Hale County, in the Black Warrior River valley of the Alabama Black Belt, was a deeply disadvantaged area. It was the setting of James Agee and Walker Evans's 1941 book Let Us Now Praise Famous Men, which sought to document white rural poverty in prose and images. The work of the Rural Studio would be focused on assistance to the area's black community. Hale County's lack of building code enforcement allowed Mockbee and his students to experiment with unusual and innovative materials and construction techniques, including the use of straw-bale construction and salvaged automobile windows, to create durable, well-designed structures at minimal cost, which would require documentation and certifications in a more structured regulatory environment.

Students lived in a series of donated lodgings, eventually settling at Morrisette House in Newbern, Alabama. Second-year students lodged at Morrisette, while fifth-year students' (Note: A standard professional degree course in architecture in the United States is a five-year program leading to a Bachelor of Architecture) lived in nearby towns. Mockbee maintained his family's residence in Canton and spent the work week at the Newbern studio.

The Rural Studio program received acclaim for introducing students to the social responsibilities of architectural practice and for providing safe, well-constructed, and inspirational buildings to the communities of West Alabama. In many cases these buildings, designed and built by students, incorporated novel materials which otherwise would be considered waste. The buildings often consisted of a combination of vernacular architecture with modernist forms.

While he headed the Rural Studio, Mockbee also acted as a visiting professor of architecture at Harvard University in 1996, the University of Virginia and Yale University in 1997, and the University of California at Berkeley in 1998.

== Death ==
Mockbee was diagnosed with leukemia in 1998. After treatment, in which his sister donated bone marrow, Mockbee recovered and returned to the work of the Rural Studio, In 2001 the cancer returned. Mockbee died on December 30, 2001, aged 57.

== Acclaim ==
Mockbee was elected to the American Institute of Architecture's College of Fellows in 1989.

In 1993, Mockbee was awarded a grant from the Graham Foundation for Advanced Studies in the Fine Arts to work toward the publication of his book, The Nurturing of Culture in the Rural South An Architectonic Documentary.

Mockbee was awarded a MacArthur Foundation fellowship, informally known as the "Genius Grant", in 2000. He put the $500,000 award toward Rural Studio projects.

Mockbee was nominated posthumously in 2003 for the American Institute of Architects (AIA) Gold Medal. No Gold Medal was awarded that year, but the following year, the medal was awarded to Mockbee.

Some of Mockbee's work was selected by Lawrence Rinder to be part of the Whitney Museum of Art 2002 Biennial. A series of exhibits and lectures on the Rural Studio were hosted in Vienna and Barcelona.

David Moos curated an exhibition on Mockbee at the Birmingham Museum of Art in Birmingham, Alabama, which was in its planning stages when Mockbee died. The exhibition was named, Samuel Mockbee and the Rural Studio: Community Architecture. This retrospective was intended to be a celebration but, because of Mockbee's death, became a memorial and tribute.

Mockbee's drawings and paintings are included in the permanent collections of the San Francisco Museum of Modern Art the Cooper Hewitt Museum, and the Carnegie Museum of Art.

== Notable projects ==
- Barton House, Madison County, Mississippi (1991) (Mockbee/Coker)
- Cook House, Oxford, Mississippi (1991) (Mockbee/Coker)
- Bryant House, Hale County, Alabama (1994) (Rural Studio)
- Harris House, Hale County, Alabama (1994) (Rural Studio)
- Yancey Chapel, Sawyerville, Alabama (1995) (Rural Studio)
- Akron Pavilion, Akron, Alabama (1996) (Rural Studio)
- Goat House, Sawyerville, Alabama (1998) (Rural Studio)
- Hero Children's Center, Greensboro, Alabama (1999) (Rural Studio)
- Thomaston Farmer's Market, Thomaston, Alabama (2000) (Rural Studio)
- Supershed and Pods, Newbern, Alabama (1997-2001) (Rural Studio)
- Akron Boys and Girls Club, Akron, Alabama (2001) (Rural Studio)
- Sanders-Dudley House, Sawyerville, Alabama (2001) (Rural Studio)
- Mason's Bend Community Center (2000) (Rural Studio)

Projects associated with Rural Studio were jointly designed by architecture students under Mockbee's supervision.
