= Harold Watson =

Harold Watson may refer to:

- Harold Watson (athlete) (1883–1963), British athlete
- Harold Watson (cricketer, born 1888) (1888–1969), English cricketer
- Harold Watson (cricketer, born 1893) (1893–1972), English cricketer and army officer
- Harold Watson (footballer) (1908–1982), English footballer
- Harold Watson (New Zealand cricketer) (1879–1958), New Zealand cricketer
- Harold Ray Watson (born 1934), farm technology pioneer
- Harry Watson (ice hockey, born 1923) (1923–2002), Canadian ice hockey player

== See also ==
- Harry Watson (disambiguation)
