= Patrick Farrish House =

Historic house in Alabama, United States

- U.S. National Register of Historic Places
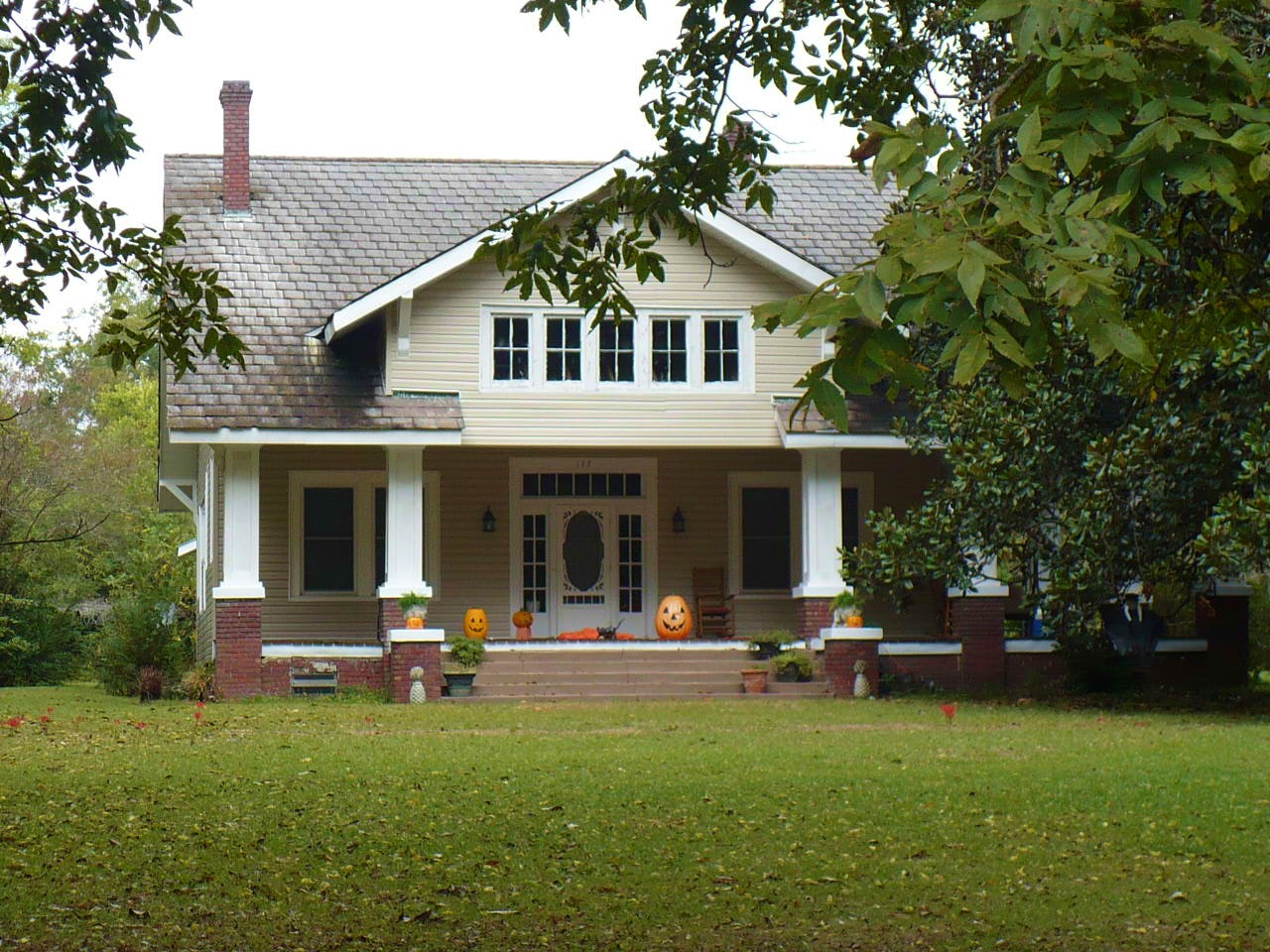

- Location within Alabama Location within the United States
- Location: Thomaston, Alabama
- Coordinates: 32°16′9″N 87°37′9″W
- Built: 1926
- Architectural style: Bungalow/Craftsman
- NRHP reference No.: 00001026
- Added to NRHP: August 31, 2000

The Patrick Farrish House, also known as the Lowe and Paula McDaniel House, is a historic house located in Thomaston, Alabama. It was built in 1926 in the Craftsman style. The house was added to the National Register of Historic Places on August 31, 2000, due to its architectural significance.
