= Harry Watson =

Harry Watson may refer to:

- Harry Watson (actor) (1921–2001), American actor, photographer and television journalist
- Harry Watson (Australian footballer) (1896–1941), Australian rules footballer for Fitzroy
- Harry Watson (British artist) (1871–1936), English landscape and portrait artist
- Harry Watson (cyclist) (1904–1996), New Zealand cyclist
- Harry Watson (footballer, born 1908) (1908–1982), English footballer
- Harry Watson (ice hockey, born 1898) (1898–1957), amateur ice hockey player fl. 1920s
- Harry Watson (ice hockey, born 1923) (1923–2002), professional ice hockey player fl. 1940s and 1950s
- Harry Watson (New Zealand artist) (1965–2025), New Zealand artist, playwright and sculptor
- Harry Watson Jr. (1876–1965), American actor and comedian
- Harry Davis Watson (1866–1945), British Army officer
- Harry L. Watson, American historian and author
- Harry T. Watson (1882–?), American college football, basketball and baseball player and coach

== See also ==
- Harold Watson (disambiguation)
- Henry Watson (disambiguation)
