= Moundville Airport =

- IATA: none; ICAO: none; FAA LID: AL44

Summary
- Airport type: Public
- Owner: Leon C. Seale Jr.
- Location: Moundville, Alabama
- Elevation AMSL: 162 ft / 49 m
- Coordinates: 32°58′05″N 087°38′26″W
- Interactive map of Moundville Airport

Runways
Direction	Length		Surface
Direction	ft	m	Surface
9/27	2,053	626	Turf
18/36	2,400	732	Turf
- Source: Federal Aviation Administration

Moundville Airport (FAA LID: AL44) is a privately owned, public-use airport in Hale County, Alabama, United States. It is located two nautical miles (2.3 mi, 3.7 km) south of the central business district of Moundville, Alabama.

== Facilities and aircraft ==
Moundville Airport covers an area of 23 acres (9.3 ha) at an elevation of 162 feet (49 m) above mean sea level. It has two runways with turf surfaces: 9/27 is 2,053 by 100 feet (626 x 30 m) and 18/36 is 2,400 by 80 feet (732 x 24 m).
