= Thomaston Central Historic District =

Historic district in Alabama, United States

- U.S. National Register of Historic Places
- U.S. Historic district
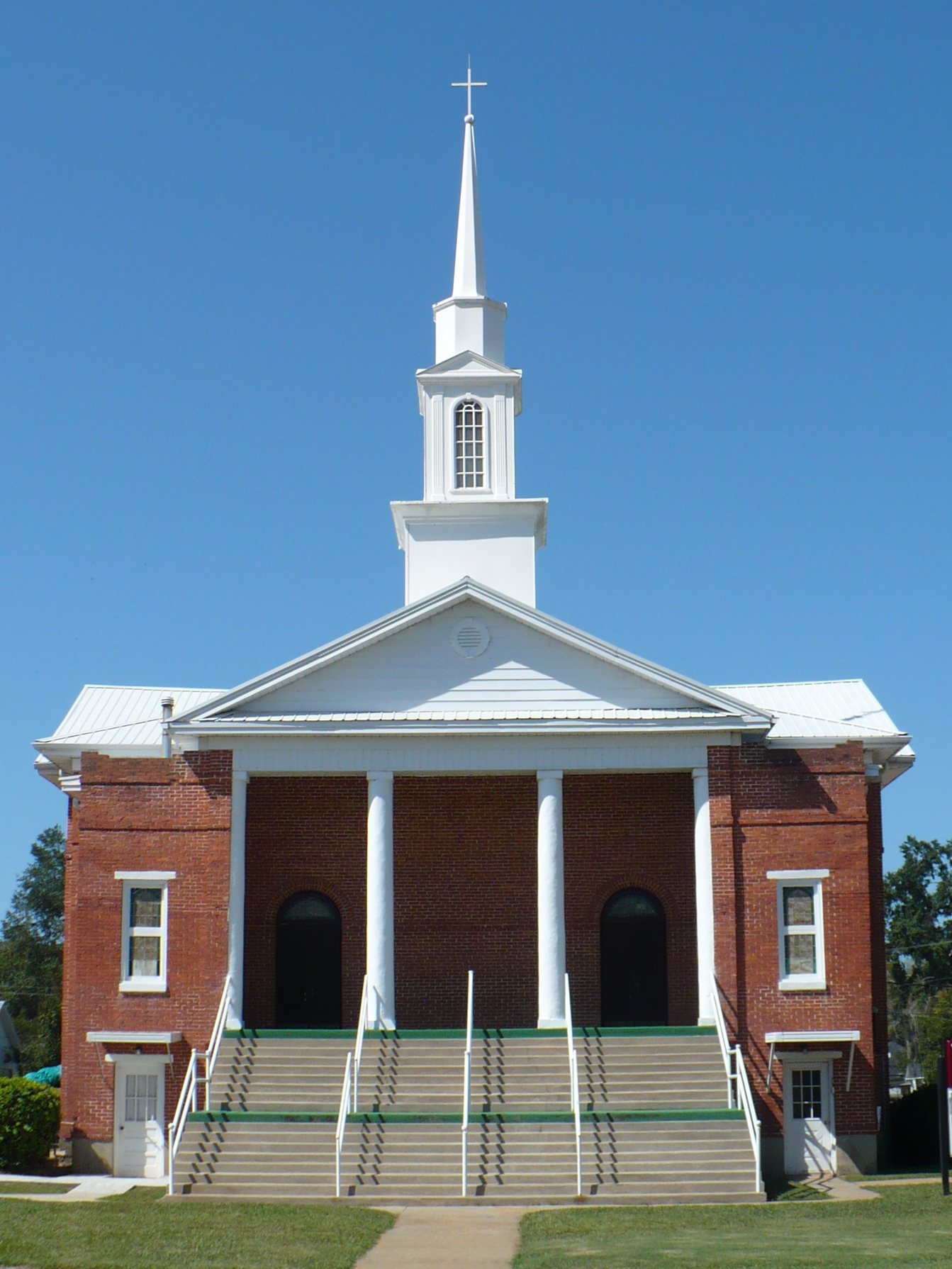
- Thomaston Baptist Church, included in the Thomaston Central Historic District.

- Location within Alabama Location within the United States
- Location: Thomaston, Alabama
- Coordinates: 32°16′8.50″N 87°37′31.08″W
- Built: 1875-1974
- Architectural style: Queen Anne, Colonial Revival
- NRHP reference No.: 00001023
- Added to NRHP: 14 October 2000

The Thomaston Central Historic District is a historic district in the town of Thomaston, Alabama, United States. Thomaston was founded in 1901, the same year that the B.S. & N.O. Railroad, now CSX Transportation, went through the town. The historic district features examples of Queen Anne and Colonial Revival architecture and is roughly bounded by Chestnut Street, Sixth Avenue, Seventh Avenue, Short Street, and the railroad.
