= C. S. Golden House =

Historic house in Alabama, United States

- C.S. Golden House
- U.S. National Register of Historic Places
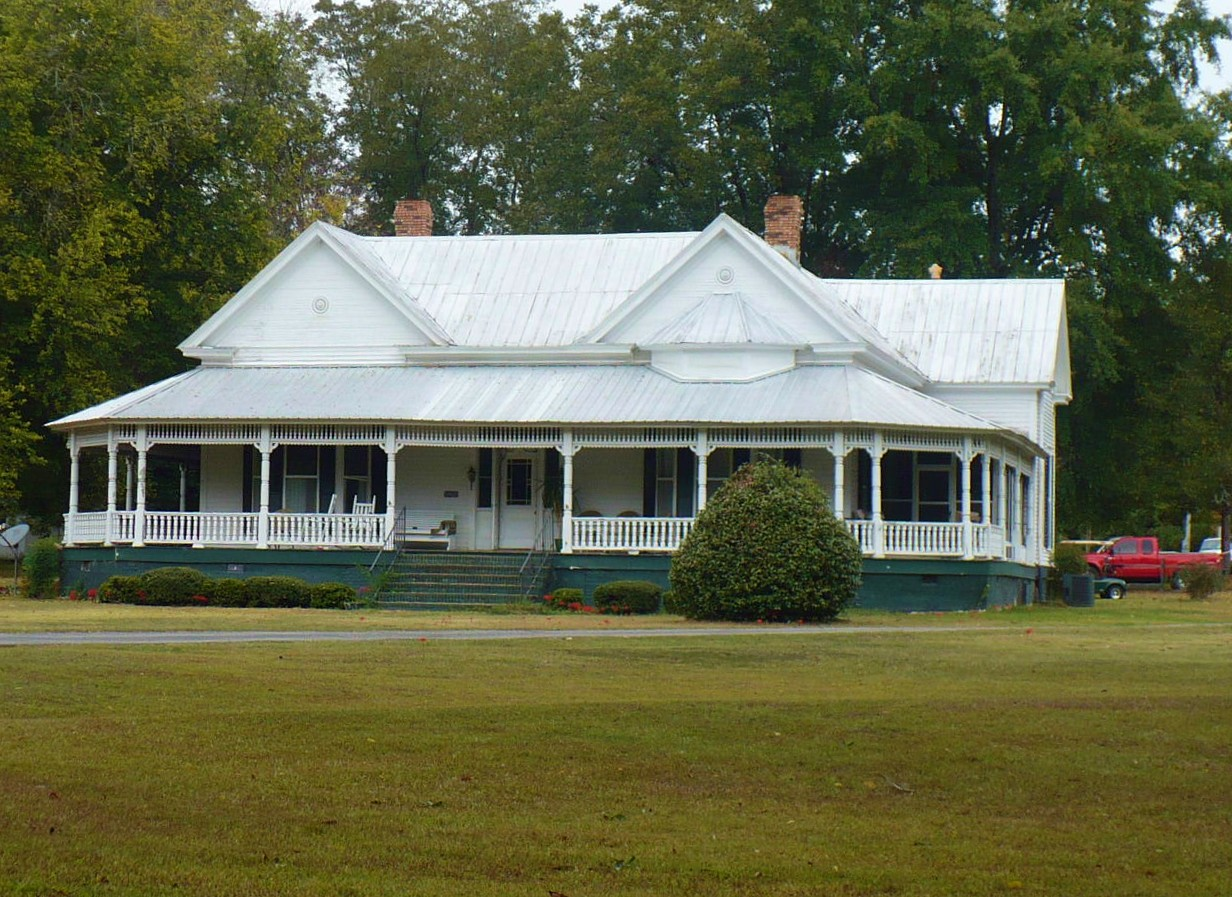

- Location within Alabama Location within the United States
- Location: Thomaston, Alabama
- Coordinates: 32°16′26″N 87°37′22″W
- Built: 1898
- Architectural style: Queen Anne
- NRHP reference No.: 00001029
- Added to NRHP: August 31, 2000

The C.S. Golden House, also known as the Leonard and Ellie Crain House, is a historic house located in Thomaston, Alabama. It was built in 1898 in the Queen Anne style. The house was added to the National Register of Historic Places on August 31, 2000, due to its architectural significance.
