= Coleman Coker =

American architect

- Born: Memphis, Tennessee
- Occupation: Architect
- Known for: community-outreach work associated with raising ecological awareness, design/build teaching, coastal resilience design

Coleman Coker is an American architect and educator. He is the first Professor of Practice at the University of Texas at Austin School of Architecture and the Director of the Gulf Coast DesignLab which he began in 2012.

The Gulf Coast DesignLab is the first long-running ecologically based program that fosters environmental activism within the field of design and for the public. Nested within our hands-on approach of civic engagement, the needs of coastal communities are addressed by GCDL students partnering with nonprofits whose missions are to bring about change through environmental education, particularly those in middle and high school. This Initiative to Support Environmental Education (I SEE) benefits coastal communities adapting to climate crisis by better understanding their local ecological conditions and developing stewardship practices. Gulf Coast DesignLab students work with these nonprofits designing and building places where teachers, biologists, ecologists and artists might engage the public in field-based environmental education work. Students of the Gulf Coast DesignLab have been recognized for their design excellence through numerous design awards and publications. Their work can be followed on Instagram at #gulf.coast.designlab

== Biography ==
Prior to his Gulf Coast DesignLab program, in 1986 Coleman Coker began a thirteen-year partnership with Samuel Mockbee. In 1995 their work was collected into the book, Mockbee / Coker, Thought and Process, published by the Princeton Architectural Press in recognition of their important and unusual work during their partnership. Mockbee / Coker won numerous national, regional and local American Institute of Architects awards, Progressive Architecture awards including an invitation from the Architectural League of New York to participate in their Emerging Voices Series.

With Mockbee's death, Coker's partnership with Samuel Mockbee ended. Coker founded buildingstudio. buildingstudio's self-described principal focus is on inventive and imaginative work. Coker's firm also has designed other projects throughout the United States as well as abroad in places such as Russia and Singapore.

The work of Coker's firm also has been featured at the Wexner Center for the Arts, the Museum of Modern Art in New York City, and the San Francisco Museum of Contemporary Art. In addition to his firm's recognition, Coker also has received many individual awards as an architect, such as the P/A Design Award, two Record Houses Awards, and a National AIA Honor Award. His individual work also has been showcased in many acclaimed museums such as the Cooper-Hewitt National Design Museum, the New York City Museum of Modern Art, the San Francisco Museum of Modern Art, the Wexner Center for the Arts, and the National Building Museum in Washington D.C.

Coker holds a master's degree in fine arts from the Memphis College of Art and in 2008, an honorary doctorate was conferred on him in fine arts from the Memphis College of Art. In addition to being the director of the Memphis Center for Architecture, he was the E. Fay Jones Chair at the University of Arkansas and the visiting Favrot Chair at Tulane University School of Architecture.

In 1996 he was awarded the Rome Prize from the American Academy in Rome, in 1994, he was a Loeb Fellow in Advanced Environmental Studies at the Harvard University Graduate School of Design.
