= Thomaston Colored Institute =

- U.S. National Register of Historic Places
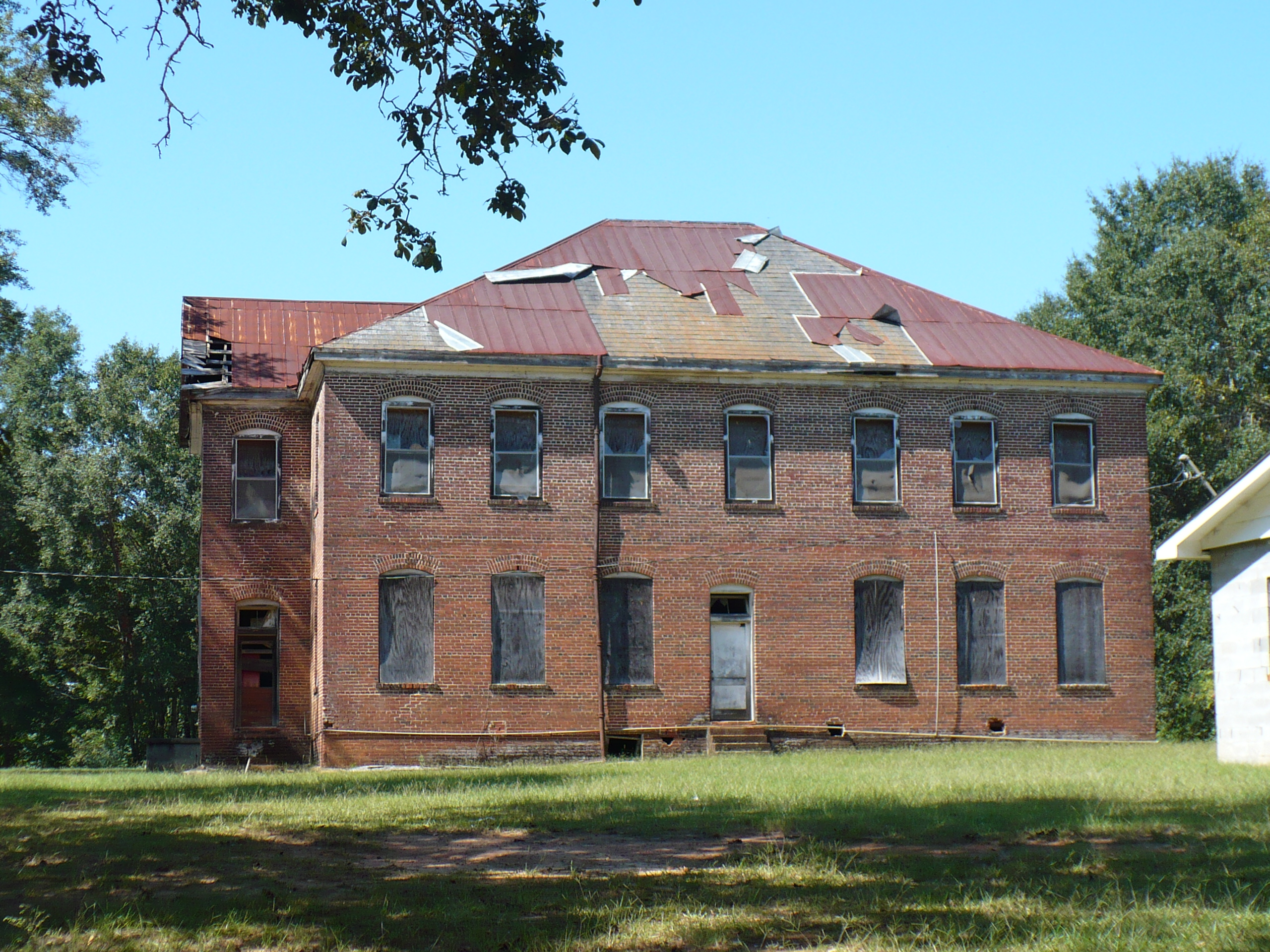
- Thomaston Colored Institute in 2006.

- Location within Alabama Location within the United States
- Location: 1120 Seventh Avenue; Thomaston, Alabama
- Coordinates: 32°16′21.46″N 87°37′49.78″W
- Area: 2 acres (0.81 ha)
- Built: 1910
- NRHP reference No.: 00001024
- Added to NRHP: August 31, 2000

The Thomaston Colored Institute, also known as the Thomaston Academy, is a historic African American school building in the town of Thomaston, Alabama, United States. This two-story brick building was completed in May 1910 as a private school by an African American religious group, the West Alabama Primitive Baptist Association.

The school served a historic African-American neighborhood in Thomaston, as the only real educational opportunity for the area's African-American population. This building has been abandoned since the 1970s, and has suffered from benign neglect. It was included on the Alabama Historical Commission's Places in Peril listing in 2000, the same year that it was placed on the National Register of Historic Places.
