= Rural Studio =

Architecture studio at Auburn University

Coordinates: 32.58877°N 87.53378°W

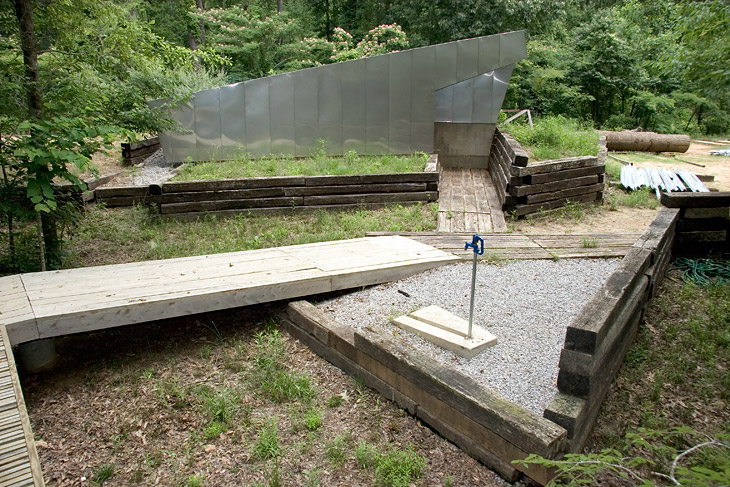
Rural Studio Restroom at Perry Landing

The Rural Studio is a design-build architecture school and studio class run by Auburn University. It teaches students about the social responsibilities of the profession of architecture and provides houses and buildings for poor communities in rural west Alabama, US, part of what is called the "Black Belt".

== History ==
The studio was founded in 1993 by architects Samuel Mockbee and D. K. Ruth. Following Mockbee's death in 2001 and Ruth's change in position at the University in 2002, the leadership position of the studio went to UK-born architect and associate professor, Andrew Freear. The Rural Studio is based in Newbern, a small town in Hale County, Alabama. Many of its best-known projects are in the tiny community of Mason's Bend, on the banks of the Black Warrior River, as well as in the nearby Perry and Marengo counties. Each year the program builds several projects: a house by the second-year students, and 2-3 community-oriented thesis projects by groups of fifth-year students.

== Community response ==
Rural Studio is generally praised for serving underprivileged communities and specifically aiding to house impoverished families. The vision of Samuel Mockbee for the studio was to teach architecture students how to make connections with and create buildings that actually serve their target community. They are encouraged to find ways of incorporating nontraditional and cost-effective materials into their designs. For example, the first house built by The Rural Studio, the Hay Bale house, used large bricks of stucco covered hay bales as the main wall material.

However, the studio has also been criticized for the way its projects take advantage of the power relations inherent in gift-giving, and for mistaking elitist architectural and middle-class values, rather than the process of political emancipation and self-determination, as a way to improve the lives of the poor. Pushback is often regarding how the studio views themselves as superior to those they are serving and victimizes the poor communities they engage with.

== Notable projects ==
=== Bryant "Hay Bale" House ===
The first project ever completed by the Rural Studio was a house for the Bryant family of Mason's Bend. Working directly with Shepard and Alberta Bryant and their grandchildren as well as with the Hale County Department of Human Resources, the second-year students of Rural Studio created a unique and affordable place for this family to live. The most notable aspect of this design was the construction of the walls. They were created from stacked hay bales that had been coated in a cement plaster, providing insulation that was both inexpensive and environmentally sustainable. Other aspects of this design include a large front porch and plentiful natural ventilation access, both in response to the climate and culture of the area.

=== Safe House Black History Museum ===
In the late 2010s, the studio renovated, restored, and made an addition to the Safe House Black History Museum in Greensboro, Alabama. The redesign was awarded third place in American Architect's Building of the Year competition.

=== $20K House ===
The $20K House is an ongoing research project at the Rural Studio that seeks to address the pressing need for decent and affordable housing in Hale County, Alabama. When the project initiated in 2005, nearly 30% of the people in Hale County were living in poverty. Due to the lack of conventional credit for people with their level of income and insufficient knowledge about alternative sources of funding, mobile homes offer the only chance for home ownership for many. However, trailers deteriorate very quickly and depreciate over time, making them not ideal for long-term living.

The $20k House project is intended to design a model home that could be reproduced on a large scale and thereby become a viable alternative to a mobile home. The challenge is for the students to design a house with a budget of $20,000. The basis is that about $10,000-12,000 will go towards materials and the remainder will go to contracted labor. Once a truly successful model has been designed, the aim is to sell the houses in conjunction with the "502 Direct Loan" provided by the Rural Housing Service. The project began in 2005, and there have been at least 16 iterations of the house.

== Projects ==
By year. Some designers are listed.

=== 2010–2011 ===
- Lion's Park - Phase VI (hub), Greensboro
- Safe House Black History Museum, Greensboro

=== 2009–2010 ===
- Lion's Park - Phase V (playscape), Greensboro

=== 2008–2009 ===
- Lion's Park - Phase IV (skateplay), Greensboro

=== 2007–2008 ===
- 20K - Bridge Greensboro
- 20K - Loft Greensboro
- 20K - Pattern Book Greensboro
- 20K - Roundwood Greensboro
- St. Luke's Church Renovation, Cahawba, Alabama

=== 2006–2007 ===
- Lion's Park - Phase II (toilets), Greensboro
- Lion's Park - Phase III (surfacing), Greensboro
- Akron Boys & Girls Club - II
- $20K House - Phase III - Greensboro, Alabama
- St. Luke's Episcopal Church, Cahawba Leon, John Mansour, Candace Rimes, Jamie Sartory, Fuller Sherrod, Walker Stone, Nick Wickersham

=== 2005–2006 ===
- Lion's Park - Phase I, Greensboro
- Hale County Hospital, Greensboro
- Hale County Animal Shelter, Greensboro
- $20K House - Phase II, Greensboro
- Michelle's House, Greensboro
  - Anna Marie Bevil, Jason Blankenship, Brittany Creehan, Jacob Fyfe, Brittany Graeber, Jennifer Isenburg, Carrie Laurendine, Jonathan Mayhall, Don Mott, Brandon Rainosek, Haley Robinson, Christopher Terrell, Marcus Buckner-Perry, Justyn Chandler, Michelle Clark, Taylor Clark, Evan Dick, Lori Fine, Robert Hall, Drew Jerdan, Brett Randall Jones, Ben Krauss, Carolyn Norton, John Plaster, Dorothy Sherling, Casey Smith, Kathleen Webb, Terran Wilson

=== 2004–2005 ===
- Perry Lakes Canopy Tower

Adrienne Brady, Natalie Butts, Paul Howard, Coley Mulcahy

- Perry County Learning Center

Dereck Aplin, Sam Currie, Amy Bell, Angela Hughey, Turnley Smith

- Christine's House, Mason's Bend, Hale County

Steven Long, Amy Bullington

- Re-sourcing

David Garner

- $20K House - Phase I, Hale County

Kellie Stokes, Laura Noguera, Phillip March Jones, Hana Loftus, Min Joo Kim

- Willie Bell House, Mason's Bend, Hale County

=== 2003–2004 ===
- Alabama Rural Heritage Center, Thomaston
  - Abby Barnett Davis, Melissa Harold, Paul Kardous, Nathan Makemeson, Robert White
- Newbern Volunteer Fire Department, Newbern
  - Will Brothers, Elizabeth Ellington, Matthew Finley, Leia Price
- Perry Lakes Park Bridge, Perry County
  - Matthew Edwards, Lynielle Houston, Charlie Jorgensen, Sara Singleton
- Sub Rosa Pantheon, Newbern
  - Carol Mockbee
- Patrick House, Newbern
- Outside In, Greensboro

=== 2002–2003 ===
- Perry Lakes Toilets and Boardwalk, Marion
  - Sarah Dunn, Matt Foley, Brannen Park, Melissa Sullivan
- Rural Heritage Center Gift Shop
  - Emily McGlohn, Katie B. Johnston, John David Caldwell
- Sunshine School, Newbern
- Organic Farmer's Stand, Newbern
- Ola Mae Porch
- Newbern Little League Field, Newbern
  - Jason A. Hunsucker, Jermaine Washington, Julie Hay, Patrick Nelson
- Music Man House, Greensboro
- dining hall, Newbern
  - Matt Christopher, Kris Johnson, Albert Ulysses Mitchum II, Clark Todd Gollotte

=== 2001–2002 ===
- Perry Lakes Cedar Pavilion
  - Jennifer Bonner, Mary Beth Maness, Nathan Orrison, Anthony Tindill
- Antioch Baptist Church
  - Jared Fulton, Gabe Michaud, William Nauck, Marion McElroy
- HERO Knowledge Cafe, Greensboro
  - Andrea Ray, John McCabe, Daniel Sweeney, Matt Wilson
- Great Hall at Morrisette, Newbern
- Akron Senior Center
  - Matthew Barrett, Jonathan Graves, Breanna Hinderliter, Joseph Yeager
- Shiles House
- Lucy House, Mason's Bend, Hale County
  - Keith Zawistowski, Marie Zawistowski, James Tate, Ben Cannard, Kerry Larkin, Floris Keverling Buisman
- Architectural Ambulance

=== 2000–2001 ===
- Newbern Baseball Club, Newbern
- Corrugated Cardboard Pod, Newbern
- Chantilly House, Newbern
- Bodark Amphitheatre, Newbern
- Akron Boys & Girls Club
- Sanders/Dudley House, Greensboro
- Newbern Playground, Newbern

=== 1999–2000 ===
- Glass Chapel, Mason's Bend, Hale County
- Thomaston Farmer's Market
- Pods at Morrisette, Newbern
- Spencer House, Newbern
- Sanders/Dudley House, Greensboro
- Mason's Bend Basketball Court

=== 1998–1999 ===
- Seed House
- HERO Children's Center, Greensboro
- Lewis House
- Supershed & Bathhouse, Newbern
- Spencer House, Newbern
- Sanders/Dudley House, Greensboro

=== 1997–1998 ===
- Butterfly House, Mason's Bend, Hale County
- HERO Children's Center, Greensboro
- Lewis House
- Supershed & Bathhouse, Newbern
- Spencer House, Newbern

=== 1996–1997 ===
- Goat House, Josh Cooper and Iain Stewart
- Butterfly House, Mason's Bend, Hale County
  - William Austin, Clifford Brooks, Kristen Kepner Coleman, Joshua Daniel, Adam Gerndt, Jo Beth Gleason, Jeremy Moffet, Justin Patwin, Hunter Simmons, Elizabeth Stallworth, Samuel Watkins, William Whittaker Jr., Heather Wootten, Jeff Marteski, Timothy Sliger, Robert Sproull, Tommy Replogle, Jon Schumann, John Ritchie, Charlie Hughes, Jimmy Turner, Jeff Johnston,
- Akron Pavilion
- H.E.R.O. Playscape, Joe Alcock and Melissa Teng Greensboro

=== 1995–1996 ===
- Wilson House, Mason's Bend, Hale County

=== 1994–1995 ===
- Yancey Chapel, Sawyerville, Hale County (See pictures at http://architecture.myninjaplease.com/?p=321.)
- Hay Bale House, Mason's Bend, Hale County
- Wilson House, Mason's Bend, Hale County
- Supershed, Newbern

=== 1993–1994 ===
- Smoke House, Mason's Bend, Hale County
- Hay Bale House, Mason's Bend, Hale County

== Awards ==
- 2008 Global Award for Sustainable Architecture, awarded to Andrew Freear
