= Thomaston, Alabama =

- Town
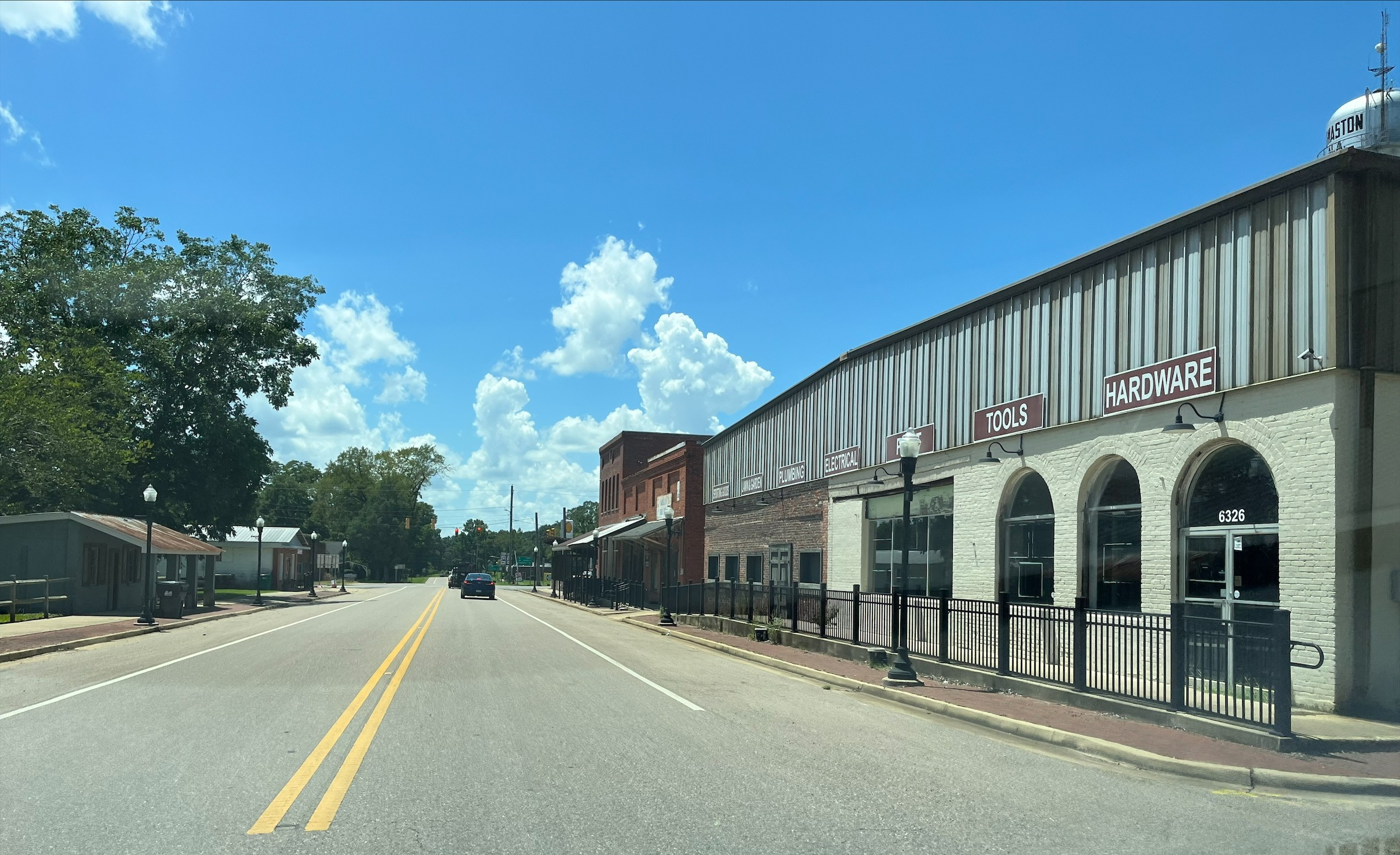
- Downtown Thomaston

- Location in Marengo County, Alabama
- Coordinates: 32°16′08″N 87°37′36″W
- Country: United States
- State: Alabama
- County: Marengo

Area
  - Total: 2.01 sq mi (5.2 km^{2})
  - Land: 2.01 sq mi (5.2 km^{2})
  - Water: 0.00 sq mi (0 km^{2})
- Elevation: 187 ft (57 m)

Population (2020)
  - Total: 326
  - Density: 161.95/sq mi (62.53/km^{2})
- Time zone: UTC-6 (Central (CST))
  - Summer (DST): UTC-5 (CDT)
- ZIP code: 36783
- Area code: 334
- FIPS code: 01-75936
- GNIS feature ID: 2406729
- Website: townofthomaston.com

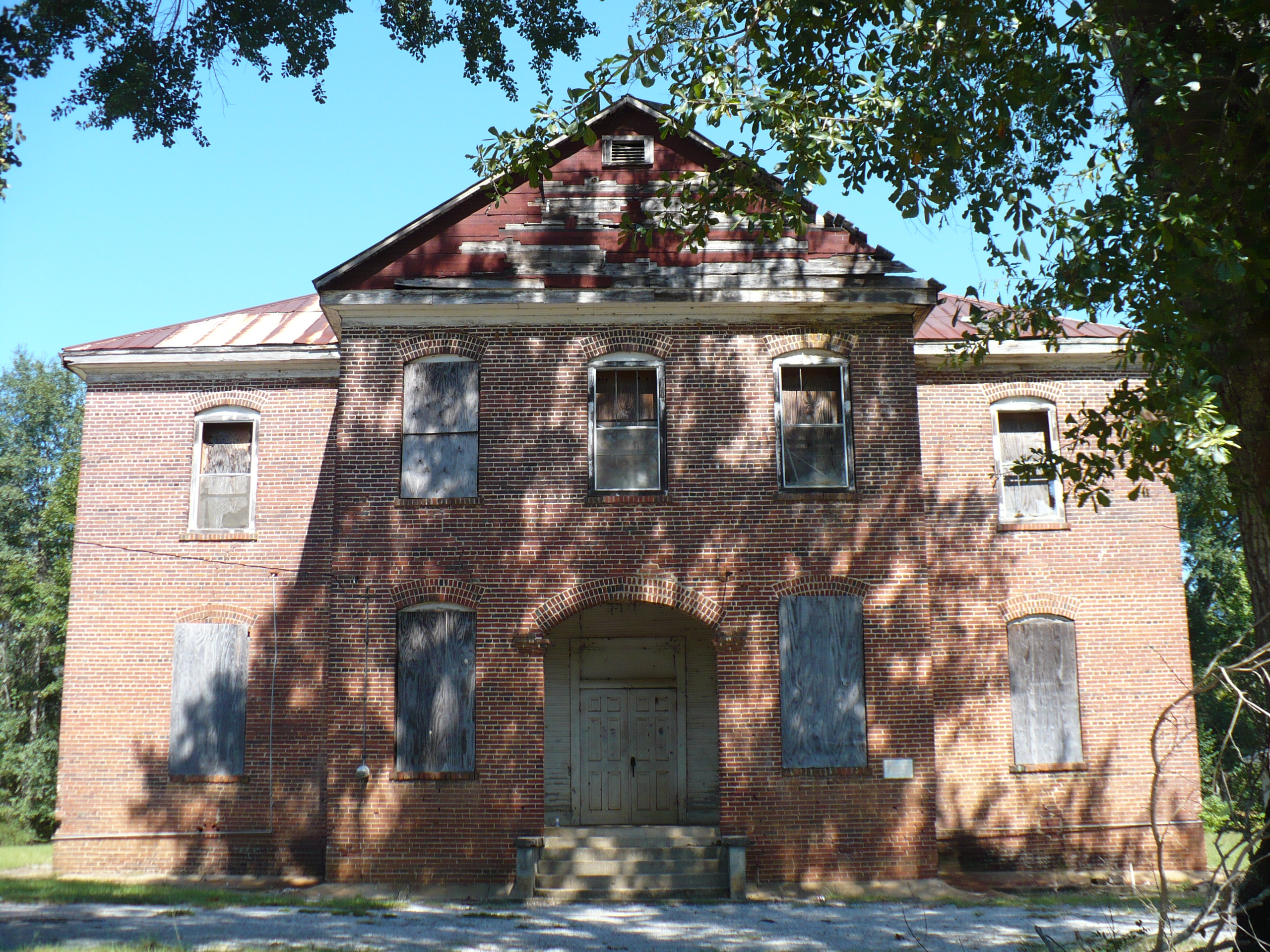
The Thomaston Colored Institute in Thomaston. On the National Register of Historic Places.

Thomaston is a town in Marengo County, Alabama, United States. At the 2020 census the population was 326, down from 417 at the 2010 census.

== History ==
Thomaston was platted in 1901 when the railroad was extended to that point. Thomaston was named for C. B. Thomas, a town promoter. A post office called Thomaston has been in operation since 1892. It was incorporated on November 15, 1901.

=== Historic sites ===
Thomaston has one historic district, the Thomaston Central Historic District, which encompasses the core of the town. Additionally, there are three individually listed properties on the National Register of Historic Places: the Thomaston Colored Institute, C. S. Golden House, and Patrick Farrish House. The town is home to the Alabama Rural Heritage Center, and the Thomaston Community Market, (both now defunct), both community projects of Auburn University's Rural Studio. Thomaston is also home to the Alabama Whitetail Records Museum.

== Geography ==
Thomaston is located in eastern Marengo County. Alabama State Route 28 (Second Avenue) passes through the town, leading west 11 miles (18 km) to Linden, the county seat, and southeast 30 miles (48 km) to Camden. State Route 25 (Range Street) crosses SR 28 in the center of town and leads north 32 miles (51 km) to Greensboro and south 29 miles (47 km) to Thomasville.

According to the U.S. Census Bureau, Thomaston has a total area of 2.0 square miles (5.2 km^{2}), all land. The town drains west to Michigan Creek, which flows north to Chickasaw Bogue and is part of the Tombigbee River watershed.

== Demographics ==
Historical population
| Census | Pop. | Note | %± |
|---|---|---|---|
| 1910 | 309 | | — |
| 1920 | 372 | | 20.4% |
| 1930 | 377 | | 1.3% |
| 1940 | 345 | | −8.5% |
| 1950 | 1,027 | | 197.7% |
| 1960 | 857 | | −16.6% |
| 1970 | 824 | | −3.9% |
| 1980 | 679 | | −17.6% |
| 1990 | 497 | | −26.8% |
| 2000 | 383 | | −22.9% |
| 2010 | 417 | | 8.9% |
| 2020 | 326 | | −21.8% |
U.S. Decennial Census; 2013 Estimate

=== Racial and ethnic composition ===
Thomaston town, Alabama – Racial and ethnic composition Note: the US Census treats Hispanic/Latino as an ethnic category. This table excludes Latinos from the racial categories and assigns them to a separate category. Hispanics/Latinos may be of any race.
| Race / Ethnicity (NH = Non-Hispanic) | Pop 2000 | Pop 2010 | Pop 2020 | % 2000 | % 2010 | % 2020 |
|---|---|---|---|---|---|---|
| White alone (NH) | 184 | 183 | 164 | 48.04% | 43.88% | 50.31% |
| Black or African American alone (NH) | 190 | 222 | 159 | 49.61% | 53.24% | 48.77% |
| Native American or Alaska Native alone (NH) | 0 | 6 | 0 | 0.00% | 1.44% | 0.00% |
| Asian alone (NH) | 0 | 2 | 0 | 0.00% | 0.48% | 0.00% |
| Native Hawaiian or Pacific Islander alone (NH) | 0 | 0 | 0 | 0.00% | 0.00% | 0.00% |
| Other race alone (NH) | 0 | 0 | 0 | 0.00% | 0.00% | 0.00% |
| Mixed race or Multiracial (NH) | 0 | 3 | 3 | 0.00% | 0.72% | 0.92% |
| Hispanic or Latino (any race) | 9 | 1 | 0 | 2.35% | 0.24% | 0.00% |
| Total | 383 | 417 | 326 | 100.00% | 100.00% | 100.00% |

=== 2020 census ===
As of the census of 2000, there were 383 people, 163 households, and 105 families residing in the town. The population density was 190.3 inhabitants per square mile (73.5/km^{2}). There were 212 housing units at an average density of 105.3 per square mile (40.7/km^{2}). The racial makeup of the town was 50.13% Black or African American, 48.56% White, and 1.31% from two or more races. 2.35% of the population were Hispanic or Latino of any race.

There were 163 households, out of which 27.0% had children under the age of 18 living with them, 39.9% were married couples living together, 23.3% had a female householder with no husband present, and 35.0% were non-families. 33.7% of all households were made up of individuals, and 25.2% had someone living alone who was 65 years of age or older. The average household size was 2.35 and the average family size was 3.01.

In the town, the population was spread out, with 24.0% under the age of 18, 9.4% from 18 to 24, 24.0% from 25 to 44, 20.6% from 45 to 64, and 21.9% who were 65 years of age or older. The median age was 40 years. For every 100 females, there were 79.0 males. For every 100 females age 18 and over, there were 69.2 males.

The median income for a household in the town was $25,972, and the median income for a family was $31,250. Males had a median income of $32,404 versus $21,750 for females. The per capita income for the town was $13,390. About 22.1% of families and 29.2% of the population were below the poverty line, including 43.2% of those under age 18 and 33.8% of those age 65 or over.

== Education ==
Amelia L. Johnson High School is a small public school in Thomaston serving students from PK to high school. It is one of three high schools in Marengo County School District. Most of its students are African American and economically disadvantaged.

== Government ==
Thomaston is governed by an elected mayor and council of five. Police protection is provided by the Thomaston Police Department. Thomaston has a small volunteer fire department. A rural health clinic is located in Thomaston and can handle small emergencies. It is open weekdays to offer medical care.
