= Moundville, Alabama =

Moundville
- Town
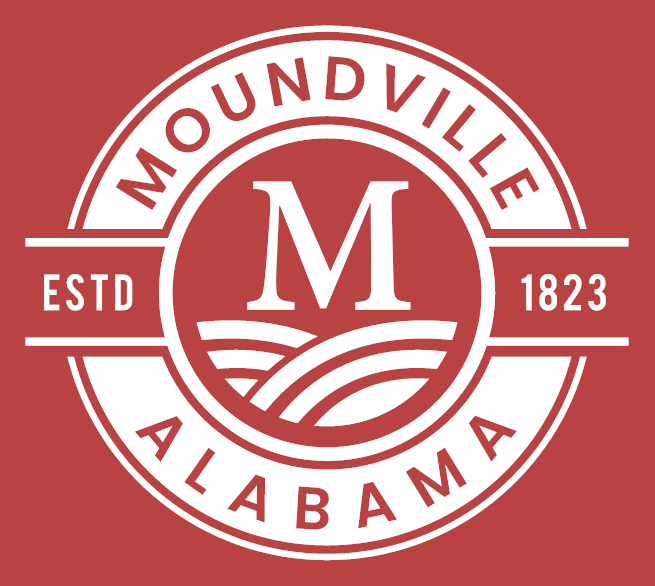
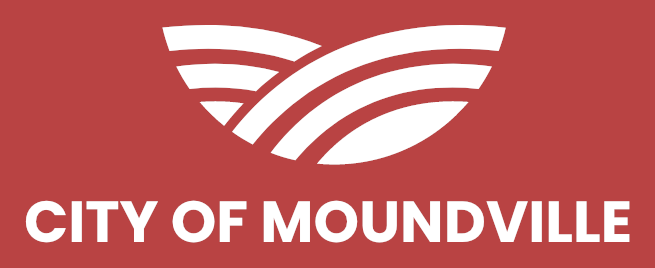
- Seal Logo

- Location of Moundville in Hale County and Tuscaloosa County, Alabama.
- Coordinates: 32°59′45″N 87°37′34″W
- Country: United States
- State: Alabama
- Counties: Hale, Tuscaloosa

Area
  - Total: 4.66 sq mi (12.08 km^{2})
  - Land: 4.61 sq mi (11.94 km^{2})
  - Water: 0.054 sq mi (0.14 km^{2})
- Elevation: 171 ft (52 m)

Population (2020)
  - Total: 3,024
  - Density: 655.9/sq mi (253.24/km^{2})
- Time zone: UTC-6 (Central (CST))
  - Summer (DST): UTC-5 (CDT)
- ZIP code: 35474
- Area codes: 205, 659
- FIPS code: 01-51648
- GNIS feature ID: 2406202
- Website: www.moundvillealabama.com

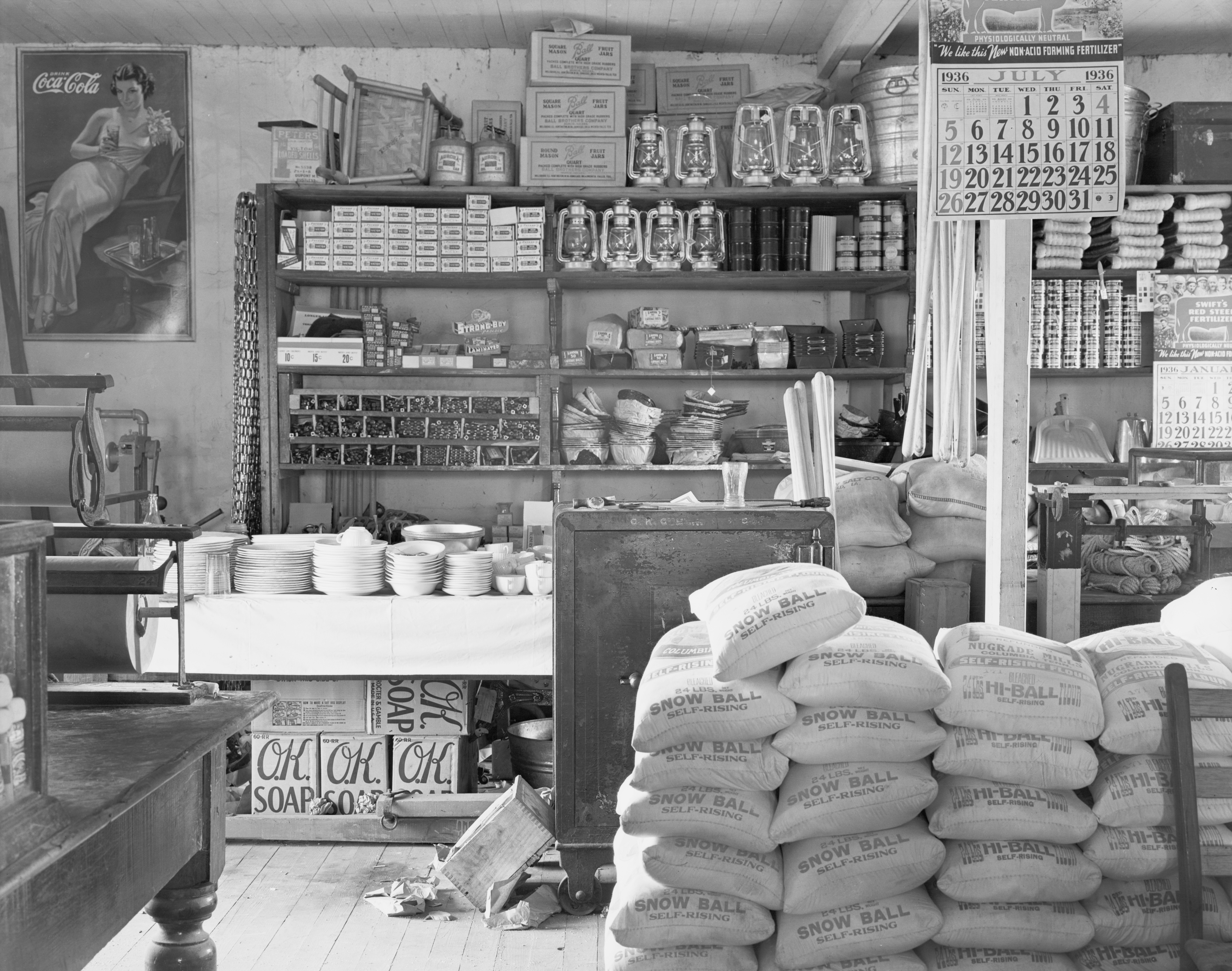
General store in Moundville, July 1936

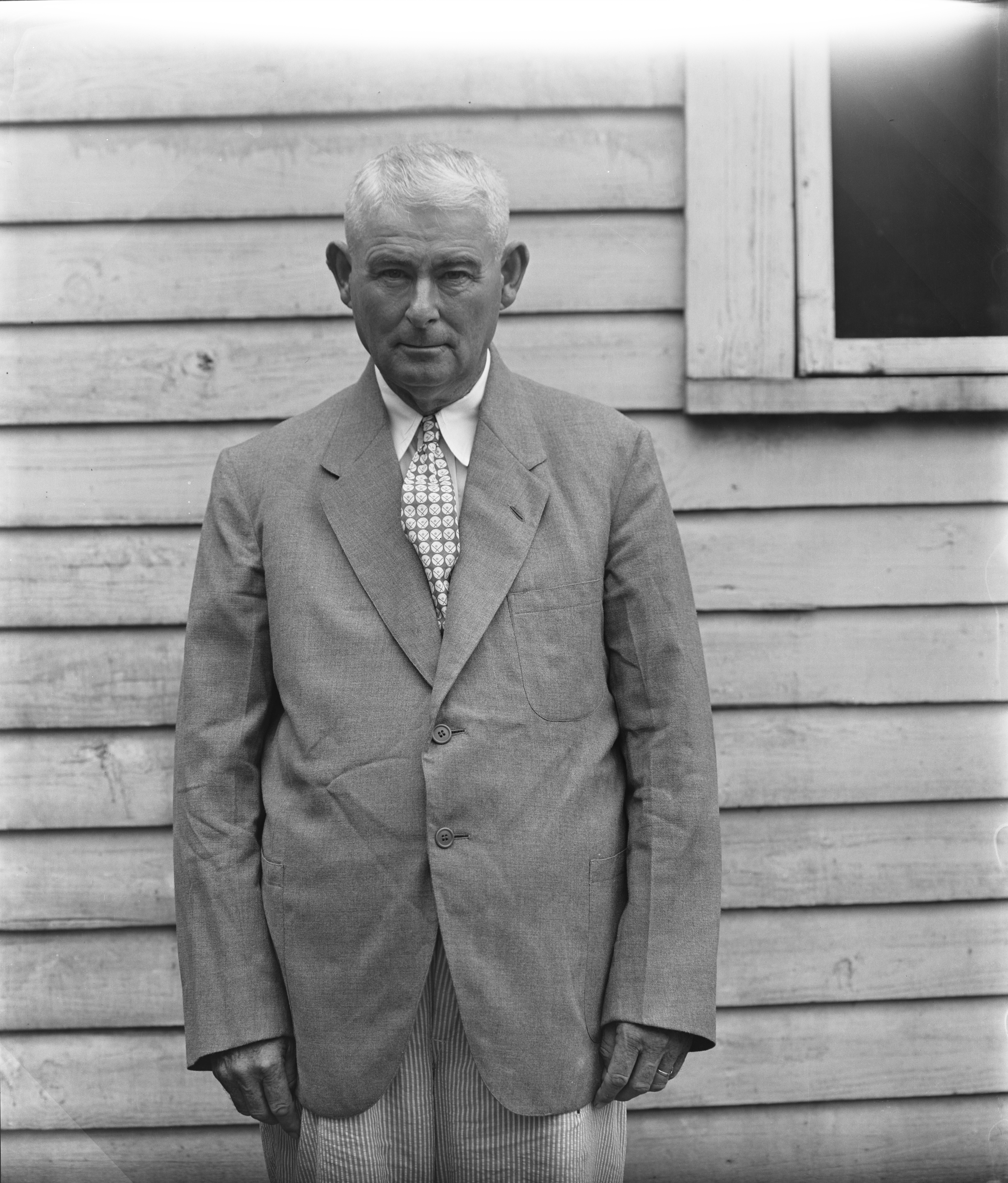
Landowner in Moundville, August 1936; photograph by Walker Evans

Moundville is a city in Hale and Tuscaloosa counties in the U.S. state of Alabama. At the 2020 census the population was 3,024. It is part of the Tuscaloosa Metropolitan Statistical Area. Within the city is Moundville Archaeological Site, the location of a prehistoric Mississippian culture political and ceremonial center.

== History ==
Moundville was incorporated on December 22, 1908. From its incorporation until the 1970 census, it was wholly within Hale County.

In the 1930s, the photographer Walker Evans and writer James Agee documented the lives of tenant farmers living in the Moundville area in the books Let Us Now Praise Famous Men (1941) and the posthumously published Cotton Tenants (2013).

== Geography ==
Moundville is located in northern Hale County on the south side of the Black Warrior River. The town limits extend north into Tuscaloosa County. Alabama State Route 69 passes through the east side of the town, leading north 16 miles (26 km) to Tuscaloosa and south 22 miles (35 km) to Greensboro, the Hale County seat.

According to the U.S. Census Bureau, Moundville has a total area of 4.6 square miles (12.0 km^{2}), of which 0.06 square miles (0.15 km^{2}), or 1.26%, are water.

=== Climate ===
According to the Köppen climate classification, Moundville has a humid subtropical climate (abbreviated Cfa).

Climate data for Moundville, 1991–2020 simulated normals (174 ft elevation)
Month	Jan	Feb	Mar	Apr	May	Jun	Jul	Aug	Sep	Oct	Nov	Dec	Year
Mean daily maximum °F (°C)	55.9 (13.3)	60.3 (15.7)	68.7 (20.4)	75.9 (24.4)	83.1 (28.4)	89.4 (31.9)	91.9 (33.3)	91.6 (33.1)	87.4 (30.8)	77.7 (25.4)	66.4 (19.1)	58.3 (14.6)	75.6 (24.2)
Daily mean °F (°C)	45.1 (7.3)	48.9 (9.4)	56.3 (13.5)	63.7 (17.6)	71.8 (22.1)	78.8 (26.0)	81.5 (27.5)	81.1 (27.3)	76.1 (24.5)	65.3 (18.5)	54.1 (12.3)	47.7 (8.7)	64.2 (17.9)
Mean daily minimum °F (°C)	34.5 (1.4)	37.4 (3.0)	43.9 (6.6)	51.3 (10.7)	60.4 (15.8)	68.0 (20.0)	71.2 (21.8)	70.7 (21.5)	64.9 (18.3)	52.9 (11.6)	41.9 (5.5)	37.0 (2.8)	52.8 (11.6)
Average precipitation inches (mm)	5.46 (138.73)	5.52 (140.31)	5.24 (133.00)	5.12 (130.11)	3.53 (89.58)	4.76 (120.78)	4.85 (123.25)	4.57 (116.19)	3.53 (89.73)	3.49 (88.70)	4.57 (115.96)	5.24 (133.13)	55.88 (1,419.47)
Average dew point °F (°C)	36.0 (2.2)	38.8 (3.8)	44.1 (6.7)	51.8 (11.0)	60.8 (16.0)	68.2 (20.1)	71.2 (21.8)	70.5 (21.4)	65.3 (18.5)	54.9 (12.7)	44.6 (7.0)	39.6 (4.2)	53.8 (12.1)
Source: PRISM Climate Group

== Demographics ==
Historical population
Census	Pop.	Note	%±
1910	253		—
1920	328		29.6%
1930	757		130.8%
1940	812		7.3%
1950	901		11.0%
1960	922		2.3%
1970	996		8.0%
1980	1,310		31.5%
1990	1,348		2.9%
2000	1,809		34.2%
2010	2,427		34.2%
2020	3,024		24.6%
U.S. Decennial Census; 2013 Estimate

=== Racial and ethnic composition ===
Moundville town, Alabama – Racial and ethnic composition Note: the US Census treats Hispanic/Latino as an ethnic category. This table excludes Latinos from the racial categories and assigns them to a separate category. Hispanics/Latinos may be of any race.
Race / Ethnicity (NH = Non-Hispanic)	Pop 2000	Pop 2010	Pop 2020	% 2000	% 2010	% 2020
White alone (NH)	1,102	1,339	1,430	60.92%	55.17%	47.29%
Black or African American alone (NH)	634	978	1,445	35.05%	40.30%	47.78%
Native American or Alaska Native alone (NH)	12	15	13	0.66%	0.62%	0.43%
Asian alone (NH)	17	16	6	0.94%	0.66%	0.20%
Native Hawaiian or Pacific Islander alone (NH)	0	0	0	0.00%	0.00%	0.00%
Other race alone (NH)	1	4	8	0.06%	0.16%	0.26%
Mixed race or Multiracial (NH)	15	32	72	0.83%	1.32%	2.38%
Hispanic or Latino (any race)	28	43	50	1.55%	1.77%	1.65%
Total	1,809	2,427	3,024	100.00%	100.00%	100.00%

=== 2020 census ===
As of the 2020 census, there were 3,024 people, 1,072 households, and 803 families residing in the town. The median age was 35.3 years. 27.4% of residents were under the age of 18 and 11.8% of residents were 65 years of age or older. For every 100 females there were 87.0 males, and for every 100 females age 18 and over there were 79.7 males age 18 and over.

0.0% of residents lived in urban areas, while 100.0% lived in rural areas.

Of households, 40.7% had children under the age of 18 living in them. Of all households, 38.6% were married-couple households, 20.0% were households with a male householder and no spouse or partner present, and 36.4% were households with a female householder and no spouse or partner present. About 27.8% of all households were made up of individuals and 7.3% had someone living alone who was 65 years of age or older.

There were 1,283 housing units, of which 10.1% were vacant. The homeowner vacancy rate was 4.7% and the rental vacancy rate was 5.9%.

=== 2010 census ===
At the 2010 census, there were 2,427 people, 1,003 total housing units with 894 being occupied households, and 652 families living in the town. The population density was 622.3 inhabitants per square mile (240.3/km^{2}). There were 1,003 housing units at an average density of 257.2 per square mile (99.3/km^{2}). The racial makeup of the town was 56.2% White, 40.4% Black or African American, 0.7% Native American, 0.7% Asian, 0.6% from other races, and 1.4% from two or more races. 1.8% of the population were Hispanic or Latino of any race.

There were 894 households, of which 37.2% had children under the age of 18 living with them, 48.7% were married couples living together, 18.8% had a female householder with no husband present, and 27.1% were non-families. 23.4% of all households were made up of individuals, and 7.6% had someone living alone who was 65 years of age or older. The average household size was 2.62 and the average family size was 3.11.

27.7% of the population were under the age of 19, 7.6% from 20 to 24, 29.0% from 25 to 44, 23.5% from 45 to 64, and 12.1% who were 65 years of age or older. The median age was 34.7 years. For every 100 females, there were 92.2 males. For every 100 females age 18 and over, there were 92.2 males.

The median household income was $43,083 and the median family income was $55,821. Males had a median income of $50,893 compared with $29,375 for females. The per capita income was $17,574. About 14.5% of families and 17.0% of the population were below the poverty line, including 13.0% of those under age 18 and 24.1% of those age 65 or over.

=== 2000 census ===
At the 2000 census, there were 1,809 people, 809 total housing units with 688 being occupied households, and 479 families living in the town. The population density was 458.7 inhabitants per square mile (177.1/km^{2}). There were 780 housing units at an average density of 197.8 per square mile (76.4/km^{2}). The racial makeup of the town was 61.30% White, 35.16% Black or African American, 0.66% Native American, 0.94% Asian, 0.83% from other races, and 1.11% from two or more races. 1.55% of the population were Hispanic or Latino of any race.

There were 688 households, of which 35.9% had children under the age of 18 living with them, 45.3% were married couples living together, 19.0% had a female householder with no husband present, and 30.4% were non-families. 27.6% of all households were made up of individuals, and 10.9% had someone living alone who was 65 years of age or older. The average household size was 2.53 and the average family size was 3.08.

29.47% of the population were under the age of 19, 6.63% from 20 to 24, 27.7% from 25 to 44, 20.67% from 45 to 64, and 15.54% who were 65 years of age or older. The median age was 35.9 years. For every 100 females, there were 90.4 males. For every 100 females age 18 and over, there were 83.4 males.

The median household income was $31,944 and the median family income was $36,000. Males had a median income of $30,625 compared with $25,231 for females. The per capita income was $13,014. About 21.2% of families and 20.9% of the population were below the poverty line, including 24.6% of those under age 18 and 16.7% of those age 65 or over.

== Attractions ==
=== Moundville Archaeological Park ===
The Moundville Archaeological Park is a National Historic Landmark. The 320-acre (1.3 km^{2}) park contains 26 prehistoric, Mississippian culture-era Native American earthwork mounds, burial sites and artifacts.

The largest mounds are located near the Black Warrior River. Mounds become smaller as one goes farther from the river. This might be an indication of the relative ranks of the people who built and maintained the mounds.

A palisade was built around three sides of the center of the Moundville site, surrounding the mounds, a plaza and residential areas. This palisade was rebuilt at least six times during the site's occupation.

== Transportation ==
=== Airport ===
Moundville Airport is a privately owned, public-use airport located two nautical miles (2.3 mi, 3.7 km) south of the central business district of Moundville.

== Education ==
Residents of Hale County are in the Hale County Schools. Residents of Tuscaloosa County are in Tuscaloosa County School System.

== Notable person ==
- Rufus Deal, former Auburn University and professional football player
