= Harold Watson (cricketer, born 1888) =

English cricketer

Personal information
- Full name: Harold Watson
- Born: 5 March 1888; Gooderstone, Norfolk, England
- Died: 14 March 1969 (aged 81); Hauxton, Cambridgeshire, England
- Batting: Right-handed
- Bowling: Right-arm fast-medium

Domestic team information
- Years: Team
- 1924: Minor Counties
- 1913–1921: Marylebone Cricket Club
- 1910–1927: Norfolk

Career statistics
Competition	First-class
Matches	13
Runs scored	189
Batting average	9.45
100s/50s	–/–
Top score	42
Balls bowled	1,731
Wickets	37
Bowling average	25.02
5 wickets in innings	1
10 wickets in match	–
Best bowling	5/70
Catches/stumpings	5/–
- Source: Cricinfo, 3 November 2013

Harold Watson (5 March 1888 – 14 March 1969) was an English cricketer active in the 1910s and 1920s, making just over a dozen appearances in first-class cricket. Born at Gooderstone, Norfolk, Watson was a right-handed batsman who bowled right-arm fast-medium and who played most of his cricket at minor counties level with Norfolk.

== Career ==
Watson made his debut in minor counties cricket for Norfolk in the 1910 Minor Counties Championship against Suffolk, winning the Minor Counties Championship in his first season. He made two appearances in his debut season but followed this up with nine in 1911, and eight in 1912. Norfolk against won the Minor Counties Championship in 1913, with Watson playing nine matches in that season. It was in 1913 that he made his debut in first-class cricket for the Marylebone Cricket Club (MCC) against Kent at Lord's, with him taking a wicket with his first delivery in first-class cricket when he dismissed England Test cricketer Frank Woolley. He followed this up with a further first-class appearance for the MCC in that season, before making a further four in 1914. He took his only first-class five wicket haul in this season against Hampshire. Additionally, Watson appeared in seven matches for Norfolk throughout that season.

Following the First World War, Watson played two first-class matches for the MCC in 1919 against Yorkshire and Oxford University. before resuming his minor counties career with Norfolk in 1920, making six appearances, as well as a single appearance for the MCC against Nottinghamshire at Lord's. He made nine appearances for Norfolk in 1921, as well as playing his final three first-class matches for the MCC against Kent, Cambridge University and Oxford University. Watson played a total of twelve first-class matches for the MCC, taking 37 wickets at an average of 24.48. With the bat, he scored 176 runs at a batting average of 9.77, with a high score of 45. Watson's best season in minor counties cricket came in 1922, when he took 59 wickets at a bowling average of 14.37 across his thirteen matches. He made ten appearances for Norfolk in 1923, and followed this up with nine in the following season. It was in 1924 that he was selected to play what would be his final appearance in first-class cricket for a combined Minor Counties cricket team against the touring South Africans. He made ten appearances for Norfolk in 1925, but made no appearances in 1926. He played three further matches for the county in 1927. In 95 appearances for Norfolk in the Minor Counties Championship, Watson took 384 wickets at an average of 17.23.

Outside of playing, Watson was also a coach, coaching cricket at RNC Dartmouth, Bishop's Stortford College and the Perse School. He was also later employed as the head porter at Trinity College, Cambridge. He died at Hauxton, Cambridgeshire on 14 March 1969.
