= Newbern, Alabama =

- Town
- Location within Hale County and Alabama
- Coordinates: 32°35′41″N 87°32′8″W
- Country: United States
- State: Alabama
- County: Hale
- Incorporated: 1854
- Named for: New Bern, North Carolina

Area
  - Total: 1.17 sq mi (3.02 km^{2})
  - Land: 1.16 sq mi (3.01 km^{2})
  - Water: 0.0039 sq mi (0.01 km^{2})
- Elevation: 187 ft (57 m)

Population (2020)
  - Total: 133
  - Density: 114.4/sq mi (44.18/km^{2})
- Time zone: UTC−6 (CST)
  - Summer (DST): UTC−5 (CDT)
- ZIP Code: 36765
- Area code: 334
- FIPS code: 01-53784
- GNIS ID: 2406982
- Website: newbernal.com/townhall

Newbern is a town in Hale County, Alabama, United States. As of the 2020 census, the population of the town was 133.

== History ==
The area was originally known as Cane Brake due to the large number of canebrakes in the area. The earliest known settler came to the area in 1816. The first grist mill was built in 1818, and the first store in 1829.

F.A. Borden built the first post office in 1832, and became the first postmaster. Two of Borden's brothers came from North Carolina in 1834, and bought most of the land in the area. They organized a town named after New Bern, North Carolina. It incorporated in 1854. A railway running from Uniontown to Newbern started operation in 1859.

The 9th Alabama Infantry Regiment was organized in the town in November 1861, to fight in the American Civil War. People from the town also fought in the Fifth, Eleventh, and Twentieth regiments. The town's economy was centered around sharecropping until the Great Depression.

The Rural Studio of Auburn University was created in 1993.

=== Mayoral dispute ===
Patrick Braxton was the only person to file to run in the 2020 mayoral election, with incumbent mayor Woody Stokes III failing to file. Judge Arthur Crawford, the election official for Hale County, informed Braxton that he won by default and would need to appoint a city council due to there being no candidates in the local elections. Braxton was the first black mayor and appointed the first majority black council in the town's history. Braxton received the key to town hall from Stokes, but all of the records had been removed from the building.

Braxton changed the locks to the building as Stokes gave keys out to friends. However, Stokes changed the locks and locked Braxton and the city council out of the town hall. Stokes and his allies refused to acknowledge Braxton as mayor and restricted his access to city mail and funds.

Before Braxton was sworn in as mayor, Stokes and the city council held a secret meeting in which they held a special election and declared themselves the winners by default ten days later. No notice of the election was published. Stokes claims that they were "attempting to rectify a decades-old mistake by holding a special election". This council held meetings without Braxton's knowledge and removed him as mayor and appointed Stokes to replace him.

Braxton and his city council filed a federal civil rights lawsuit in November 2022, stating that Stokes and his allies were conspiring to prevent him from governing the town due to his race. Braxton and his allies requested a special election to occur alongside the 2024 presidential election, but Judge Kristi DuBose ruled against them although she stated that they were "likely to succeed on the merits of their constitutional claim". A bench trial was scheduled for September 2024. It ended with a settlement that included a promise to hold an election in 2025.

Elections had not been held in the town for decades and Stokes' lawyers stated that they had not occurred for 60 years. They stated that the mayoralty "has simply been passed from individual to individual to anyone who would agree to be Mayor without regard to elections".

=== 2025 election ===
On June 21, 2024, a settlement was reached in which Braxton would return to his mayoral duties.

Following court-mandated elections scheduled for 2025, Braxton faced Laird Cole in the town's first contested election since the 1960s. Braxton won the election with 66 votes to Cole's 26 votes.

== Geography ==
According to the U.S. Census Bureau, the town has a total area of 1.2 square miles (3.1 km^{2}), all land.

The town is located in the geographic region known as the Black Belt, related to the fertile soil which attracted developers of cotton plantations in the antebellum years, and also to the population of enslaved African Americans who worked at those sites. Many areas of the rural Black Belt are still majority African American in population.

== Demographics ==
Historical population
Census	Pop.	Note	%±
1880	454		—
1900	564		—
1910	515		−8.7%
1920	438		−15.0%
1930	389		−11.2%
1940	388		−0.3%
1950	367		−5.4%
1960	316		−13.9%
1970	286		−9.5%
1980	307		7.3%
1990	222		−27.7%
2000	231		4.1%
2010	186		−19.5%
2020	133		−28.5%
U.S. Decennial Census; 2010 2020

Newbern is part of the Tuscaloosa, Alabama Metropolitan Statistical Area.

=== Racial and ethnic composition ===
Newbern town, Alabama – Racial and ethnic composition Note: the US Census treats Hispanic/Latino as an ethnic category. This table excludes Latinos from the racial categories and assigns them to a separate category. Hispanics/Latinos may be of any race.
Race / Ethnicity (NH = Non-Hispanic)	Pop 2000	Pop 2010	Pop 2020	% 2000	% 2010	% 2020
White alone (NH)	53	59	42	22.94%	31.72%	31.58%
Black or African American alone (NH)	178	123	85	77.06%	66.13%	63.91%
Native American or Alaska Native alone (NH)	0	0	0	0.00%	0.00%	0.00%
Asian alone (NH)	0	0	0	0.00%	0.00%	0.00%
Native Hawaiian or Pacific Islander alone (NH)	0	0	0	0.00%	0.00%	0.00%
Other race alone (NH)	0	0	0	0.00%	0.00%	0.00%
Mixed race or Multiracial (NH)	0	0	3	0.00%	0.00%	2.26%
Hispanic or Latino (any race)	0	4	3	0.00%	2.15%	2.26%
Total	231	186	133	100.00%	100.00%	100.00%

=== 2000 census ===
As of the census of 2000, there were 231 people, 91 households, and 59 families residing in the town. The population density was 198.5 inhabitants per square mile (76.6/km^{2}). There were 110 housing units at an average density of 94.5 per square mile (36.5/km^{2}). The racial makeup of the town was 22.94% White and 77.06% Black or African American.

There were 91 households, out of which 38.5% had children under the age of 18 living with them, 37.4% were married couples living together, 25.3% had a female householder with no husband present, and 34.1% were non-families. 33.0% of all households were made up of individuals, and 19.8% had someone living alone who was 65 years of age or older. The average household size was 2.54 and the average family size was 3.28.

In the town, the population was spread out, with 32.0% under the age of 18, 6.5% from 18 to 24, 26.0% from 25 to 44, 18.6% from 45 to 64, and 16.9% who were 65 years of age or older. The median age was 34 years. For every 100 females, there were 83.3 males. For every 100 females age 18 and over, there were 80.5 males.

The median income for a household in the town was $20,682, and the median income for a family was $31,042. Males had a median income of $25,625 versus $11,875 for females. The per capita income for the town was $9,476. About 17.5% of families and 31.4% of the population were below the poverty line, including 40.0% of those under the age of eighteen and 33.3% of those 65 or over.

== Education ==
All residents in the county are in the Hale County Schools.

== Notable people ==
- Frank Allen, former Major League Baseball player
- Henry Watson Jr., owned a cotton plantation in Newbern

== Gallery ==
The below photographs were taken in Newbern as part of the Historic American Buildings Survey in the 1930s:

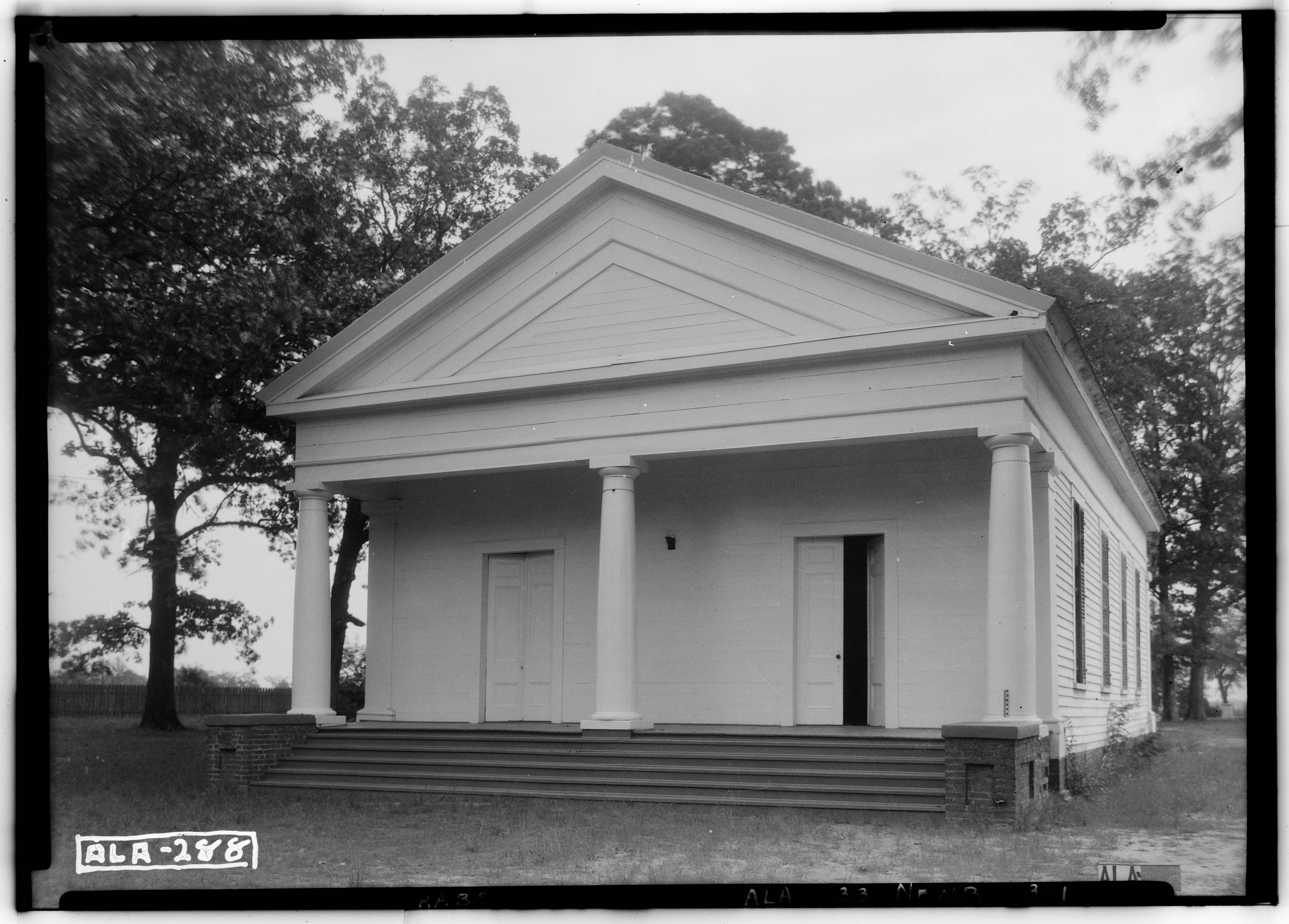
Presbyterian Church

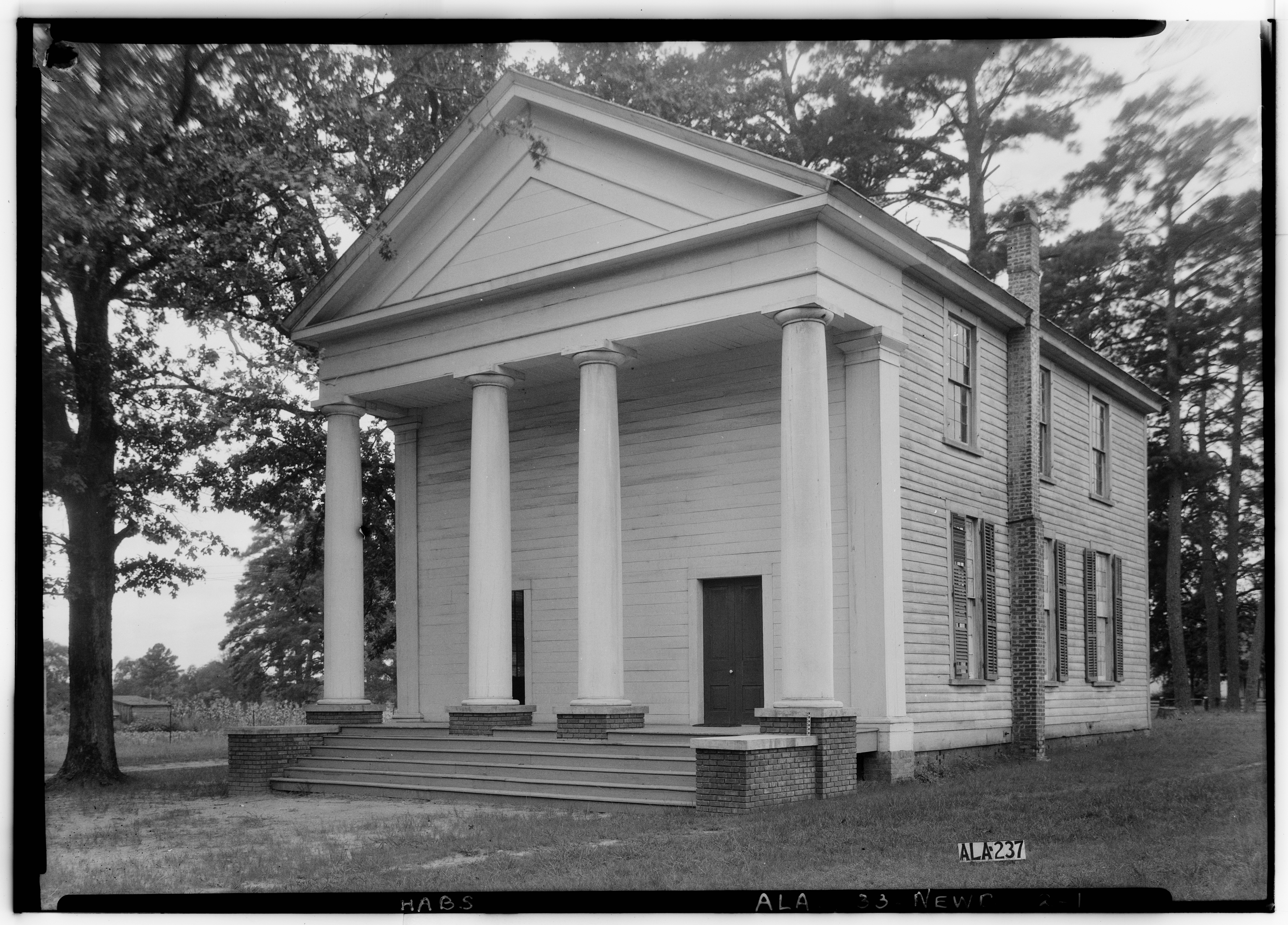
Baptist Church

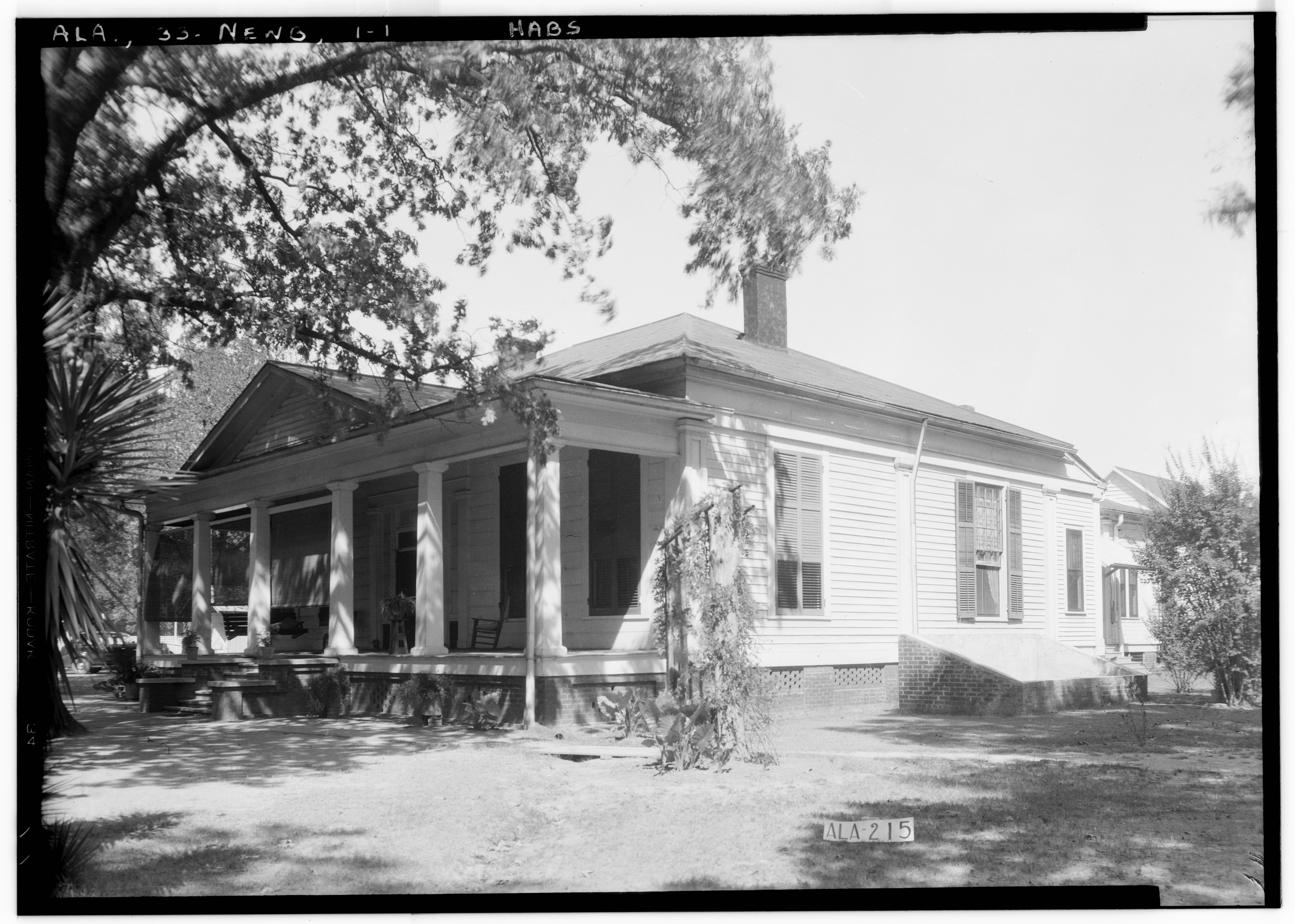
Walthall House
