= Alabama Rural Heritage Center =

Former museum in Thomaston, Alabama

- Established: 1986
- Dissolved: 2022
- Location: Thomaston, Alabama, United States
- Coordinates: 32°16′15″N 87°37′35″W

The Alabama Rural Heritage Center is a regional heritage organization located in Thomaston, Alabama that was established in 1986, but closed permanently as of January, 2022. It was established by the Alabama Department of Economic and Community Affairs and local volunteers. The center, now defunct, was headquartered in the old home economics building on the former Marengo County High School campus, which was repurposed by Auburn University's Rural Studio. The center is run by the non-profit Alabama Rural Heritage Foundation, but is no longer operational.

Before closing doors, The Rural Heritage Center housed a combination folk art gallery, theater, restaurant, community meeting place, and a commercial production kitchen. The center produces local food products under the "Mama Nem's" trademark. The recipes for their products were developed with the Auburn University College of Human Sciences through a U.S. Department of Housing and Urban Development grant.
