= Henry Watson Jr. =

American lawyer (1810–1891)

- Born: September 24, 1810; East Windsor, Connecticut
- Died: February 10, 1891 (aged 80); Northampton, Massachusetts
- Education: Trinity College; Harvard University
- Occupations: Lawyer; Planter; Businessman
- Spouse: Sophia Peck Watson
- Children: 5
- Relatives: Sereno Watson (brother)

Henry Watson Jr. (1810–1891) was an American lawyer, plantation owner and businessman.

== Biography ==
=== Early life ===
Henry Watson Jr. was born on September 24, 1810, in East Windsor, Connecticut. His father was Henry Watson and his mother, Julia (Reed) Watson. His brother, Sereno Watson, became a renowned botanist. He had six other brothers and one sister.

He graduated from Trinity College in Hartford, Connecticut, and Harvard University in Cambridge, Massachusetts. At Harvard, Professor John Collins Warren (1778–1856) taught him scientific racism, which would pave the way for his future career as a slaveowner. Shortly after graduation, he moved to Mobile, Alabama, to find work as a teacher in an academy or on a plantation in the affluent American South. Unable to find work even after meeting Henry Clay Sr. (1777–1852), he returned to the North by riding on horseback with his friend Caleb Mills (1806–1879), where they observed the ruins of Native American settlements. He then studied the Law under Henry Barnard (1811–1900).

=== Career ===
By 1834, he settled in Greensboro, Alabama. At first he longed to return home to Connecticut, but he soon became a successful lawyer. He went on to purchase a 1,500-acre plantation in Newbern, Alabama, and up to 200 slaves, making him one of the largest slaveholders in Alabama at the time. He became an outspoken proponent of slavery. He founded the Planter's Insurance Company and served as its president. He also owned shares in the Ohio Land Company, and his wealth increased significantly as a result of the Panic of 1837. Prior to the Civil War, he was part of the "planter elite." He spent much of his time at the resort town of White Sulphur Springs, West Virginia, and in New York City.

During the American Civil War of 1861–1865, he lived in Europe. As early as 1861, he said, "I wish the Union could be preserved" and he likened secession to a family feud.

After the war, he was unable to produce as much cotton as before, as worker productivity had decreased significantly and slavery was no longer an option, especially due to the ubiquitous presence of Union League members. He also complained that former female slaves no longer wanted to work, and had become "idle," wanting to act like ladies supported by their husbands. Instead, he decided to rent small plots of his plantation land through sharecropping.

=== Personal life ===
He married Sophia (Peck) Watson (1821–1860), the daughter of Frederick and Eliza Peck of Greensboro, Alabama. They had five children.

His nephew, Julius A. Reed, worked as a tutor on the plantation of John Perkins Jr. (1819–1885) in Natchez, Mississippi.

=== Death ===
He died on February 10, 1891, in Northampton, Massachusetts.
