= Hale County Schools =

School district in Alabama

Hale County School District is a school district in Hale County, Alabama.

Statewide testing ranks the schools in Alabama. Those in the bottom six percent are listed as "failing." As of early 2018, two local schools were included in this category:

- Greensboro High School
- Hale County High School

Hale County High School serves grades 9 to 12 and has about 360 students. The student body is about half white and African American with a small number of Hispanic students.

== See also ==
- List of high schools in Alabama
