= Carpenter Gothic =

North American architectural style

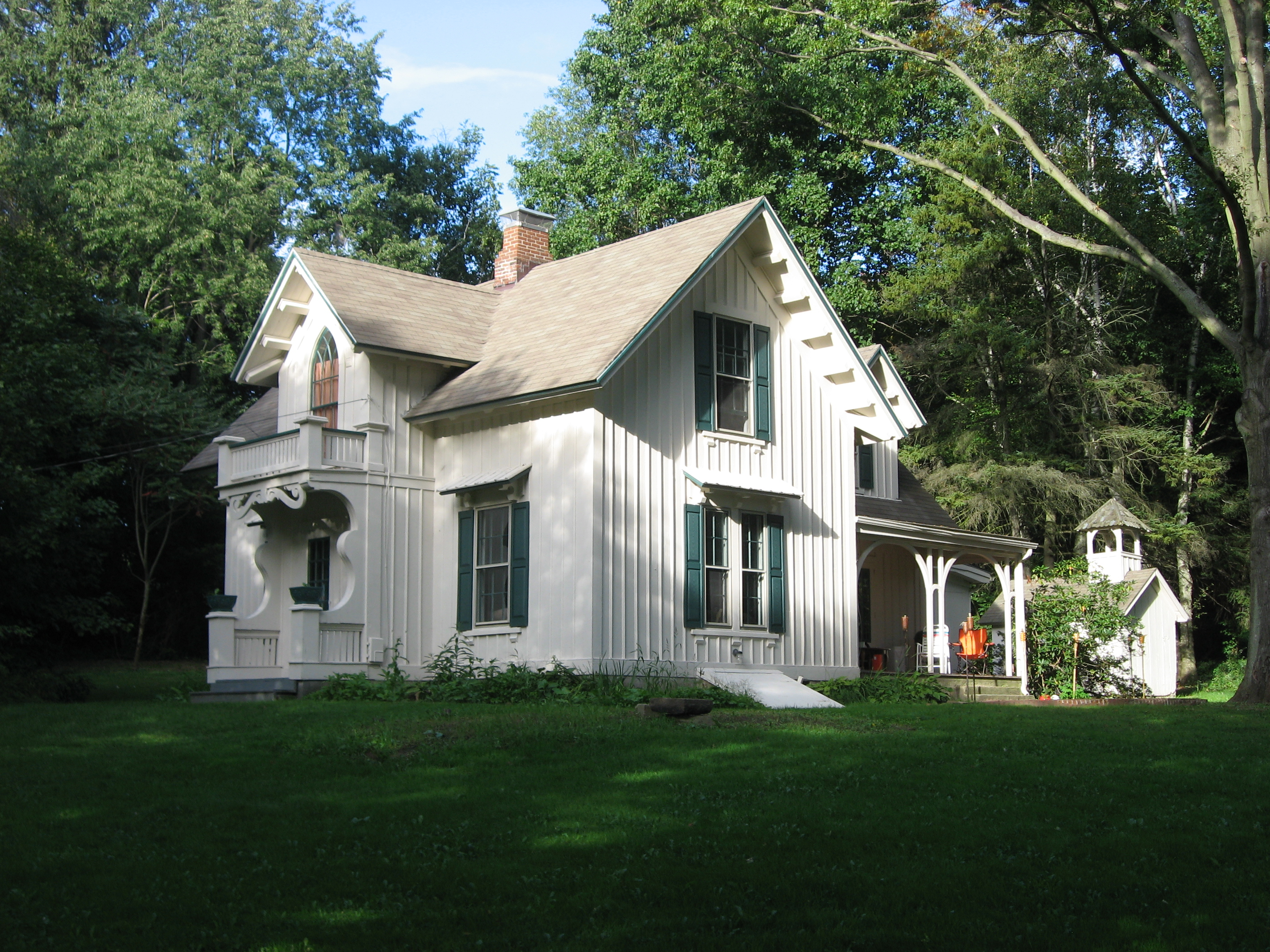
Aaron Ferrey House, Kent, Ohio, an example of Downing's Form III

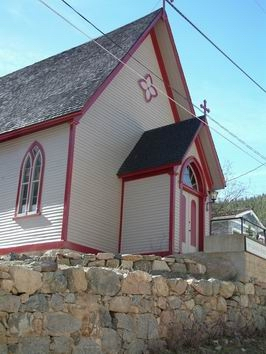
Grace Episcopal Church (Georgetown, Colorado)

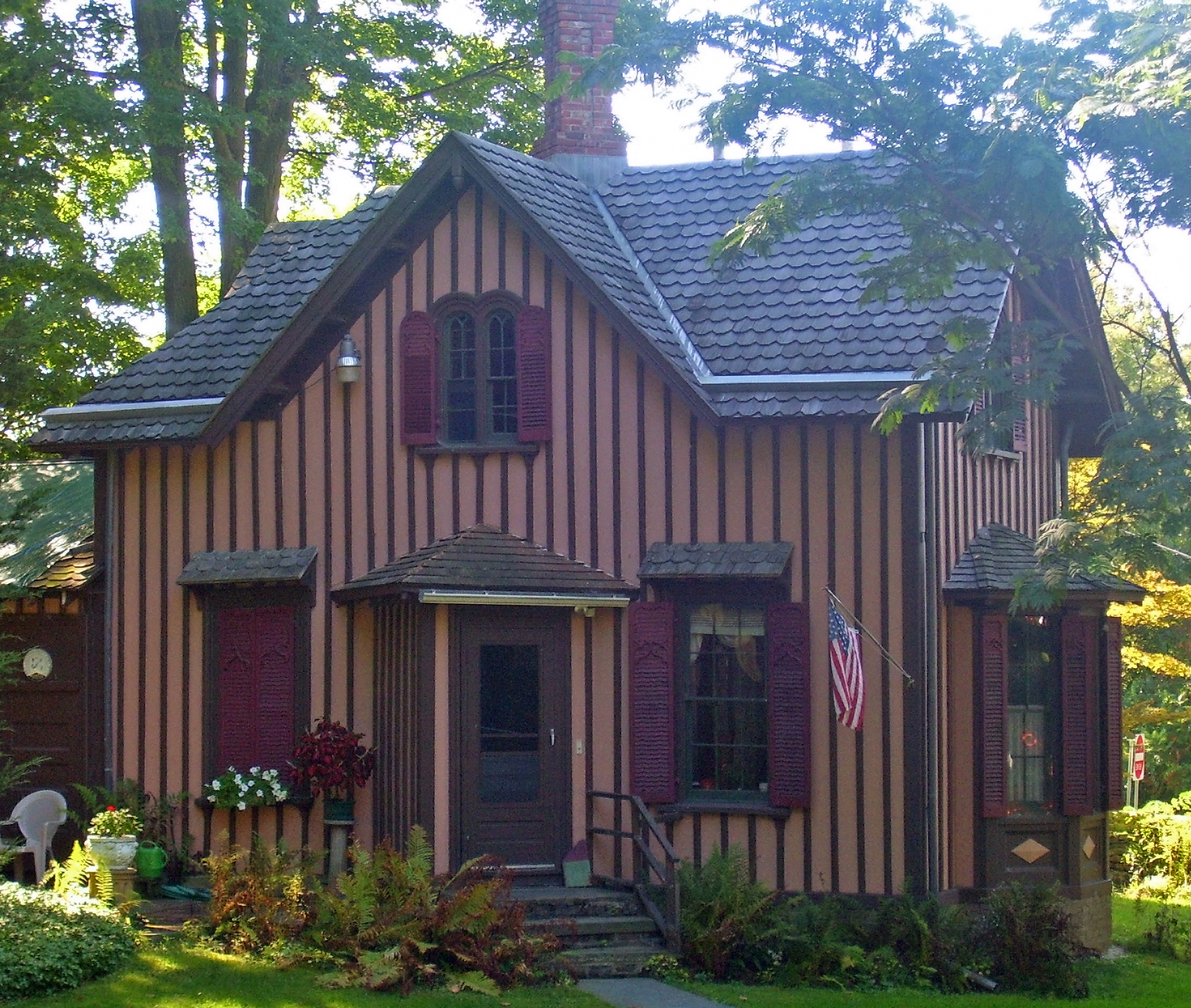
Springside in Poughkeepsie, New York

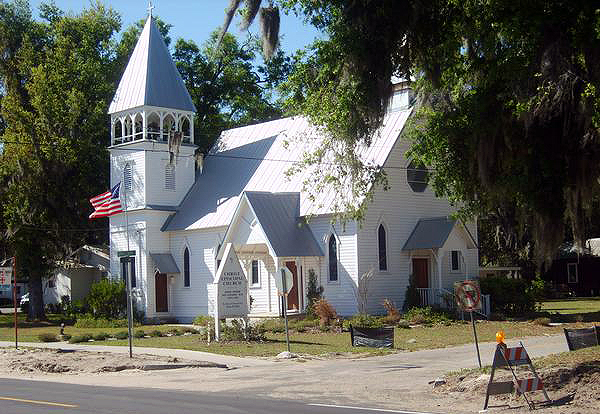
Christ Church, Fort Meade, Florida

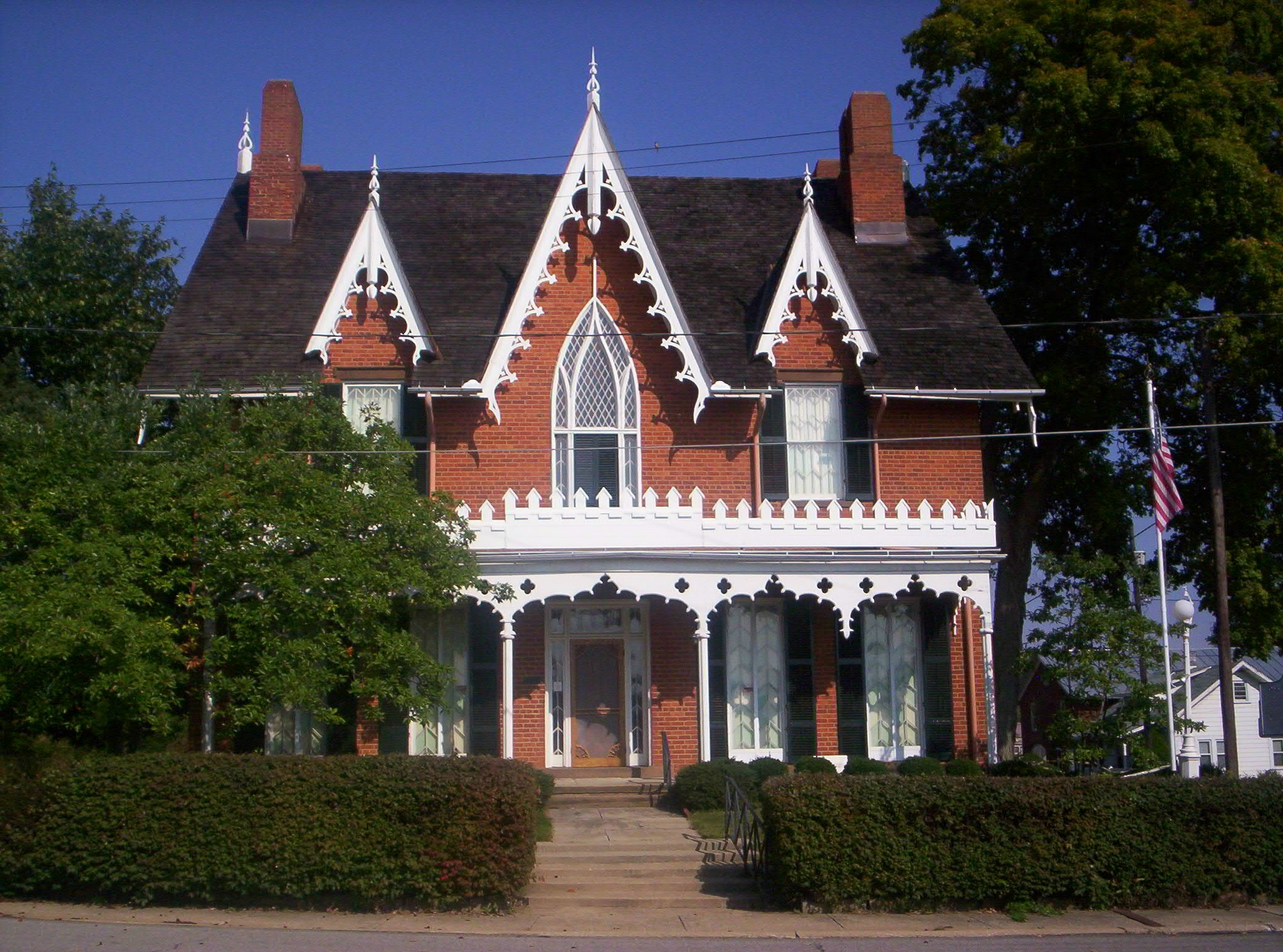
Oak Hill Cottage, Mansfield, Ohio: Carpenter Gothic trim on a brick house in the manner of A.J. Davis's Rural Residences

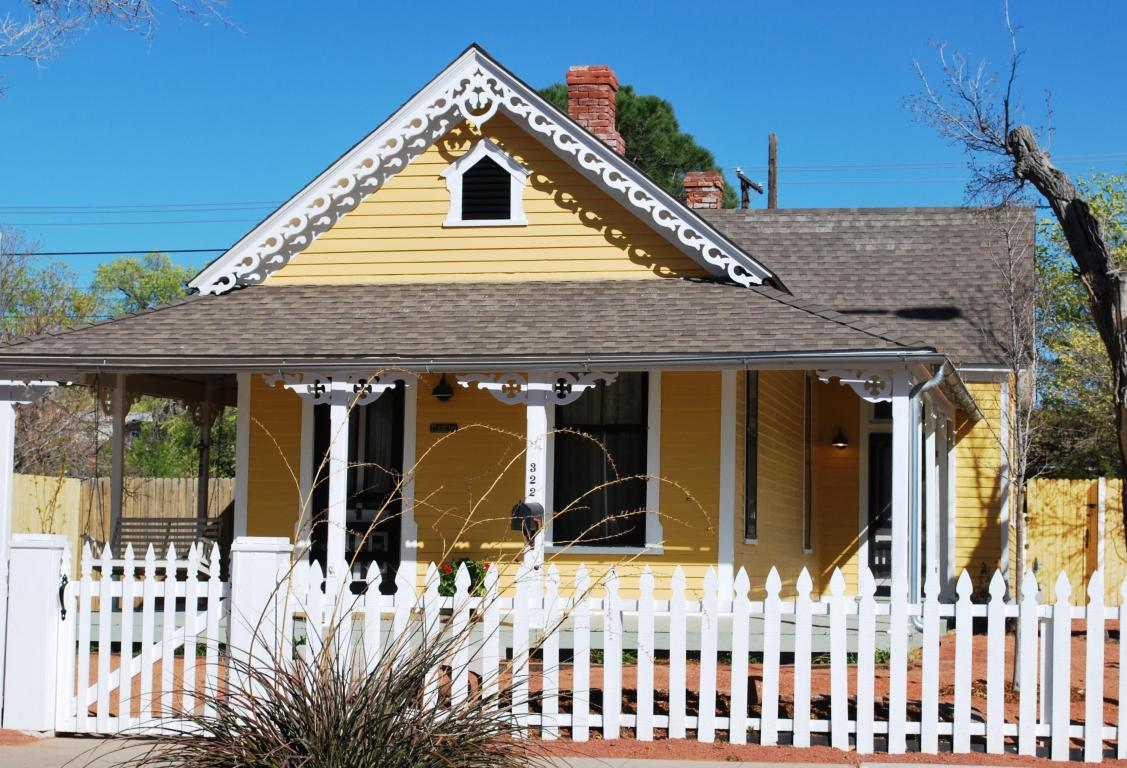
The Seth House in Albuquerque, New Mexico – Built in 1882

Carpenter Gothic, also sometimes called Carpenter's Gothic or Rural Gothic, is a North American architectural style an application of Gothic Revival architectural detailing and picturesque massing applied to wooden structures built by house-carpenters. The abundance of North American timber and the carpenter-built vernacular architectures based upon it made a picturesque improvisation upon Gothic a natural evolution. Carpenter Gothic improvises upon features that were carved in stone in authentic Gothic architecture, whether original or in more scholarly revival styles; however, in the absence of the restraining influence of genuine Gothic structures, the style was freed to improvise and emphasize charm and quaintness rather than fidelity to received models. The genre received its impetus from the publication by Alexander Jackson Davis of Rural Residences and from detailed plans and elevations in publications by Andrew Jackson Downing.

Rose Hill Mansion Bluffton, SC

== History ==
Carpenter Gothic houses and small churches became common in North America in the late nineteenth century. Additionally during this time, Protestant followers were building many Carpenter Gothic churches throughout the midwest, northeast, and some areas in the south of the US. This style is a part of the Gothic Revival movement. For example, these structures adapted Gothic elements, such as pointed arches, steep gables, and towers, to traditional American light-frame construction. The invention of the scroll saw and mass-produced wood moldings allowed a few of these structures to mimic the florid fenestration of the High Gothic. But in most cases, Carpenter Gothic buildings were relatively unadorned, retaining only the basic elements of pointed-arch windows and steep gables. Probably the best known example of Carpenter Gothic is the house in Eldon, Iowa, that Grant Wood used for the background of his famous painting American Gothic.

== Characteristics ==
Carpenter Gothic is largely confined to small domestic buildings and outbuildings and small churches. It is characterized by its profusion of jig-sawn details, whose elaborate forms the craftsmen-designers were freed to experiment with by the invention of the steam-powered scroll saw. A common but not necessary feature is board and batten siding. Other common features include decorative bargeboards, gingerbread trim, pointed-arched windows, wheel window, one-story veranda, and steep central gable. A less common feature is buttressing, especially on churches and larger houses. Exterior elements like pointed arches made their way inside the homes as well. This can be seen in pointed arch openings and doorways.

== Ornamental use ==
Being a part of the Gothic Revival, the ornamentation in Carpenter Gothic is much more eclectic; it uses more superficial and obvious motifs. Specifically, Carpenter Gothic ornamentation, referred to as gingerbread, is not limited to use on wooden structures but has been used on other structures, especially Gothic Revival brick houses such as the Warren House in a historic district in Newburgh, New York, which is said to epitomize the work of Andrew Jackson Downing, but was actually done by his one-time partner, Calvert Vaux. Ornamentation can be seen in the interior as well. Many elements in the interiors were highly crafted such as staircases, walls, ceilings, and fireplaces. Examples of this ornament use include wainscoting, ceiling beams or coffered ceilings, and ornate wallpapers. Gothic style furniture was also used.

== Geographic extent ==
Carpenter Gothic structures are typically found in most states of the United States, except Arizona and New Mexico. There is one Carpenter Gothic in the Huning Highlands Historical District in downtown Albuquerque circa 1882 built by the Seth family who lived there until 2002. Many Carpenter Gothic houses were built in Nevada in the 1860–1870s (Virginia City, Reno, Carson City, and Carson Valley areas) and still exist (2010). Although this style was most common in northern America, nowhere else had built as many churches as in Florida between 1870 and 1900. In Canada, carpenter Gothic places of worship are found in all provinces and the Northwest Territories, while Carpenter Gothic houses seem to be limited to Ontario, Quebec and the Maritime Provinces.

== Endangered buildings ==
Many American Carpenter Gothic structures are listed on the National Register of Historic Places, which may help to ensure their preservation. Many, though, are not listed and those in urban areas are endangered by the increased value of the land they occupy.

A current example of this is St. Saviour's Episcopal Church, Maspeth, New York, built in 1847 by Richard Upjohn. It was sold to a developer in 2006. Its rectory had already been demolished and a deal with the City of New York to preserve the church in exchange for higher density on the remaining vacant land fell through and the parcel went on the market for $10 million.

After a number of postponements, in March 2008, just hours before the final deadline to demolish the church, a deal was struck with a local community group, whereby they were allowed time to raise money to move the structure. At a cost of some $2 million, the building was reduced to its original appearance and dismantled into pieces, so it could be transported through the narrow, winding streets of the neighborhood. It was reconstructed on the grounds of a cemetery in the nearby neighborhood of Middle Village, where it is now used for community activities.

== American Gothic ==
American Gothic is a painting by Grant Wood from 1930. It depicts American rural life with its subject being a "stern" looking father and his daughter in front of a small Carpenter Gothic style house. Wood's inspiration came from a cottage designed in the Carpenter Gothic style with a distinctive upper window and a decision by the artist to paint the house along with "the kind of people I fancied should live in that house."

== Steamboat Gothic ==
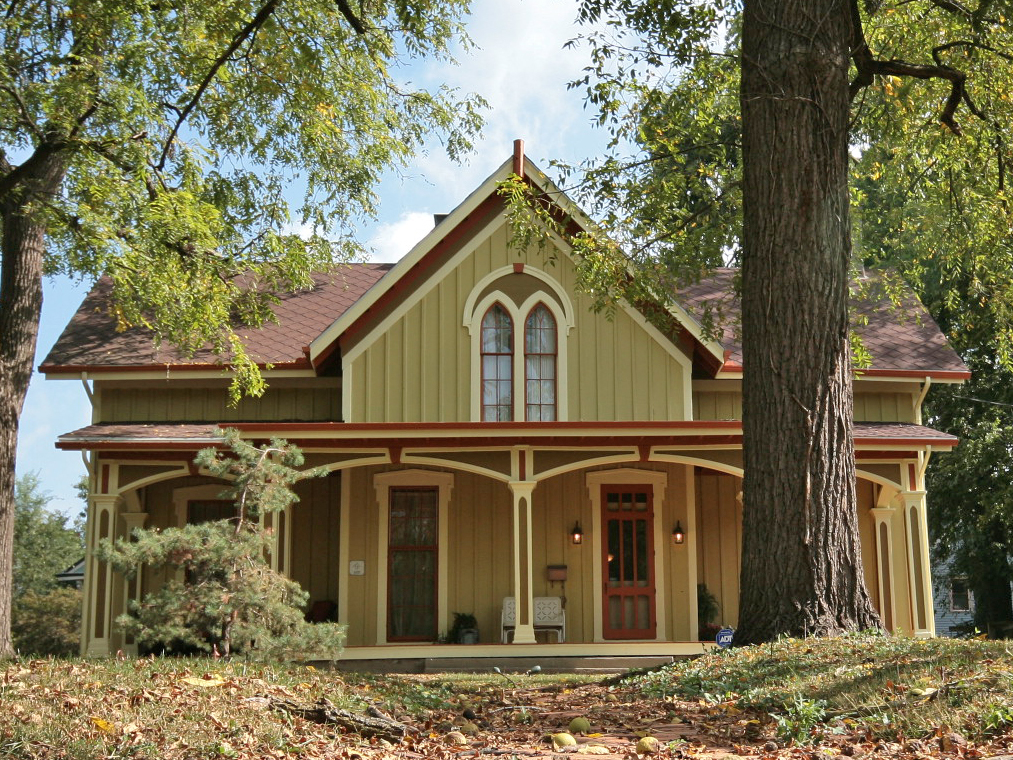
Langdon House, Cincinnati, Ohio, an example of Steamboat Gothic

Steamboat Gothic architecture, a term popularized by Frances Parkinson Keyes's novel of that name, is sometimes confused with Carpenter Gothic architecture, but Steamboat Gothic usually refers to large houses in the Mississippi and Ohio river valleys that were designed to resemble the steamboats on those rivers.

== Recent examples ==
St. Luke's Church in Blue Ridge, Georgia, was built in 1995. Houses and churches are sometimes built in the Carpenter Gothic style into the 21st Century.

== Outside North America ==
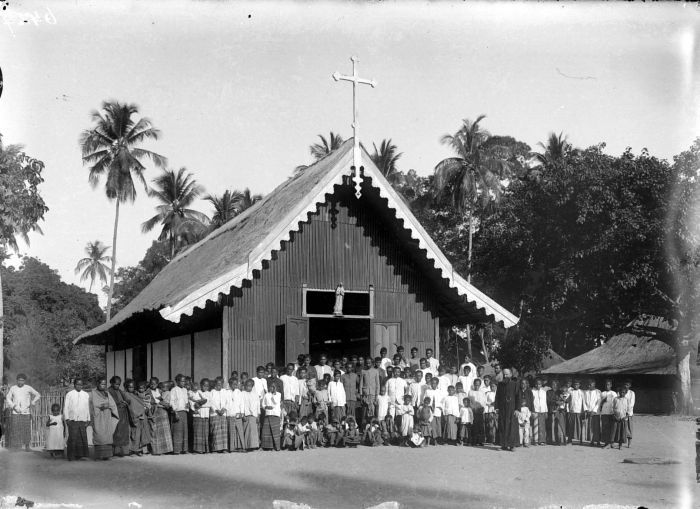
Local Catholic church of Konga, Larantuka, Indonesia. (circa 1915)

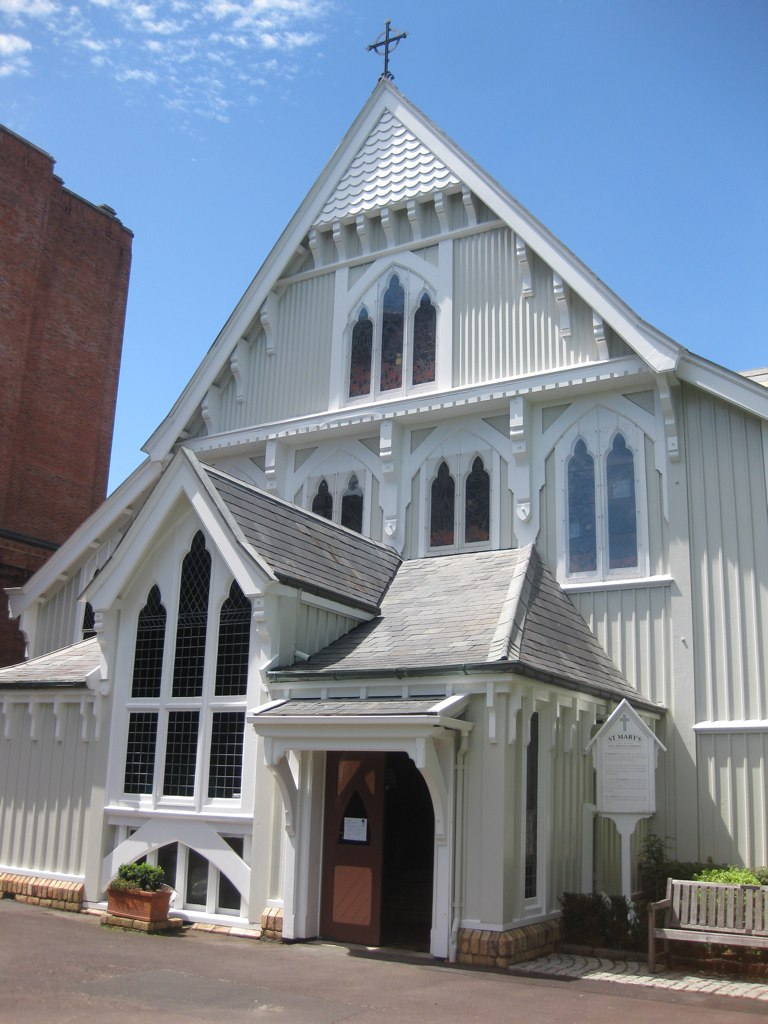
St Mary's Cathedral of Auckland, completed in 1898.

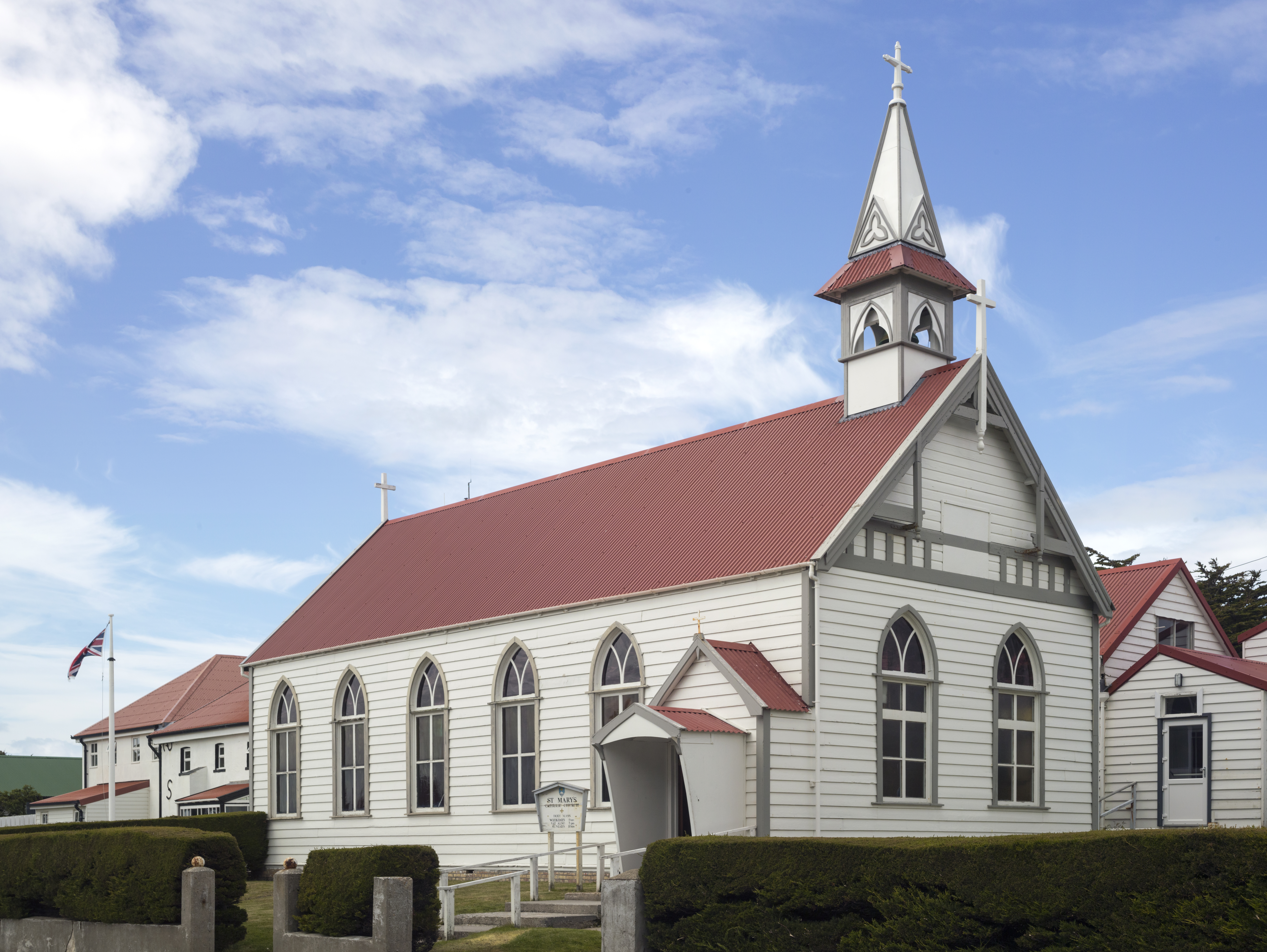
St. Mary's Catholic Church of Stanley, Falkland Islands, constructed in 1899.

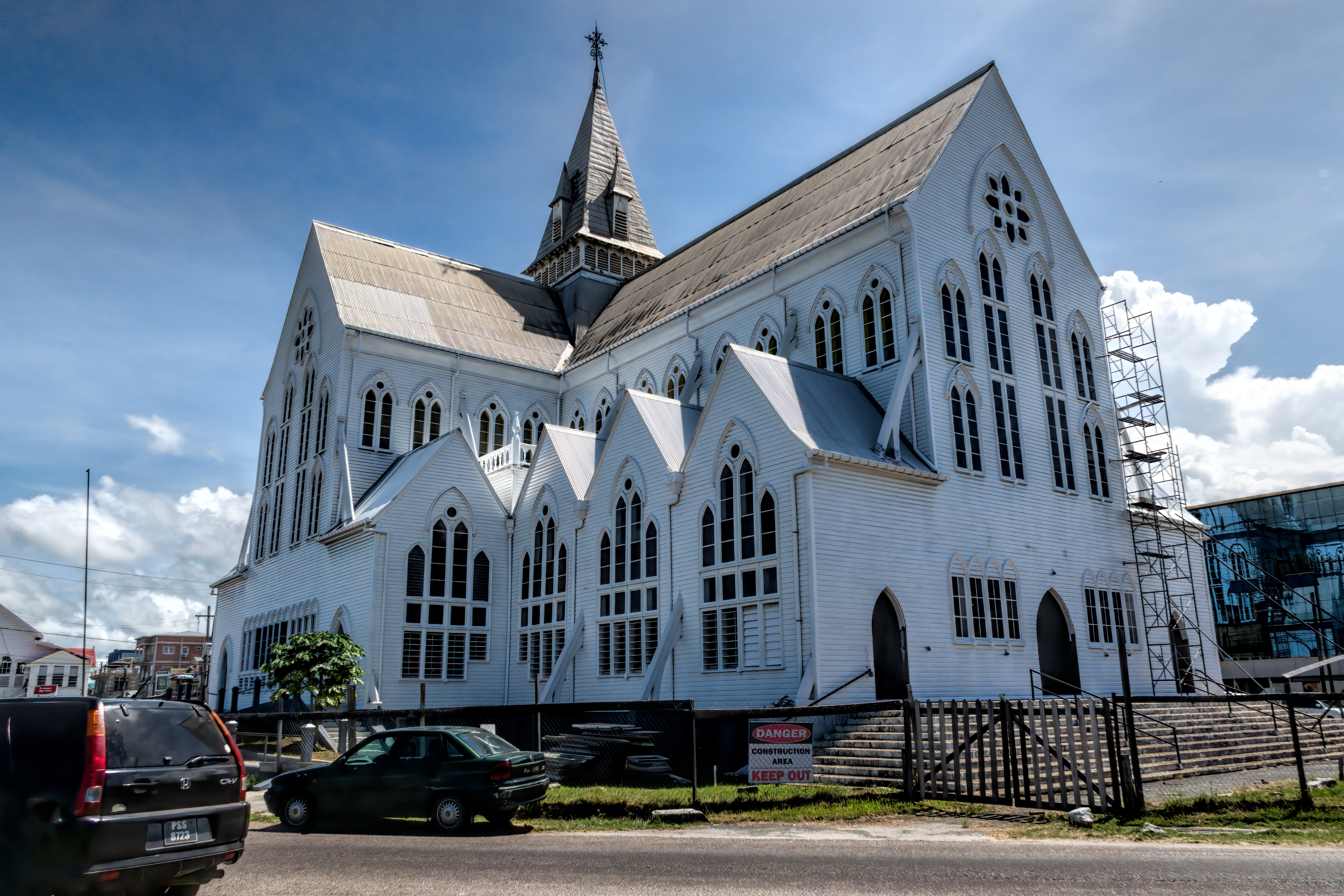
St. George's Cathedral, Georgetown, Guyana

Many nineteenth-century timber Gothic Revival structures were built in Australia, and in New Zealand – such as Frederick Thatcher's Old St. Paul's, Wellington, and Benjamin Mountfort's St Mary's, but the term "Carpenter's Gothic" is not often used, and many of their architects also built in stone.

== Gallery ==
=== Churches, synagogues, etc. ===
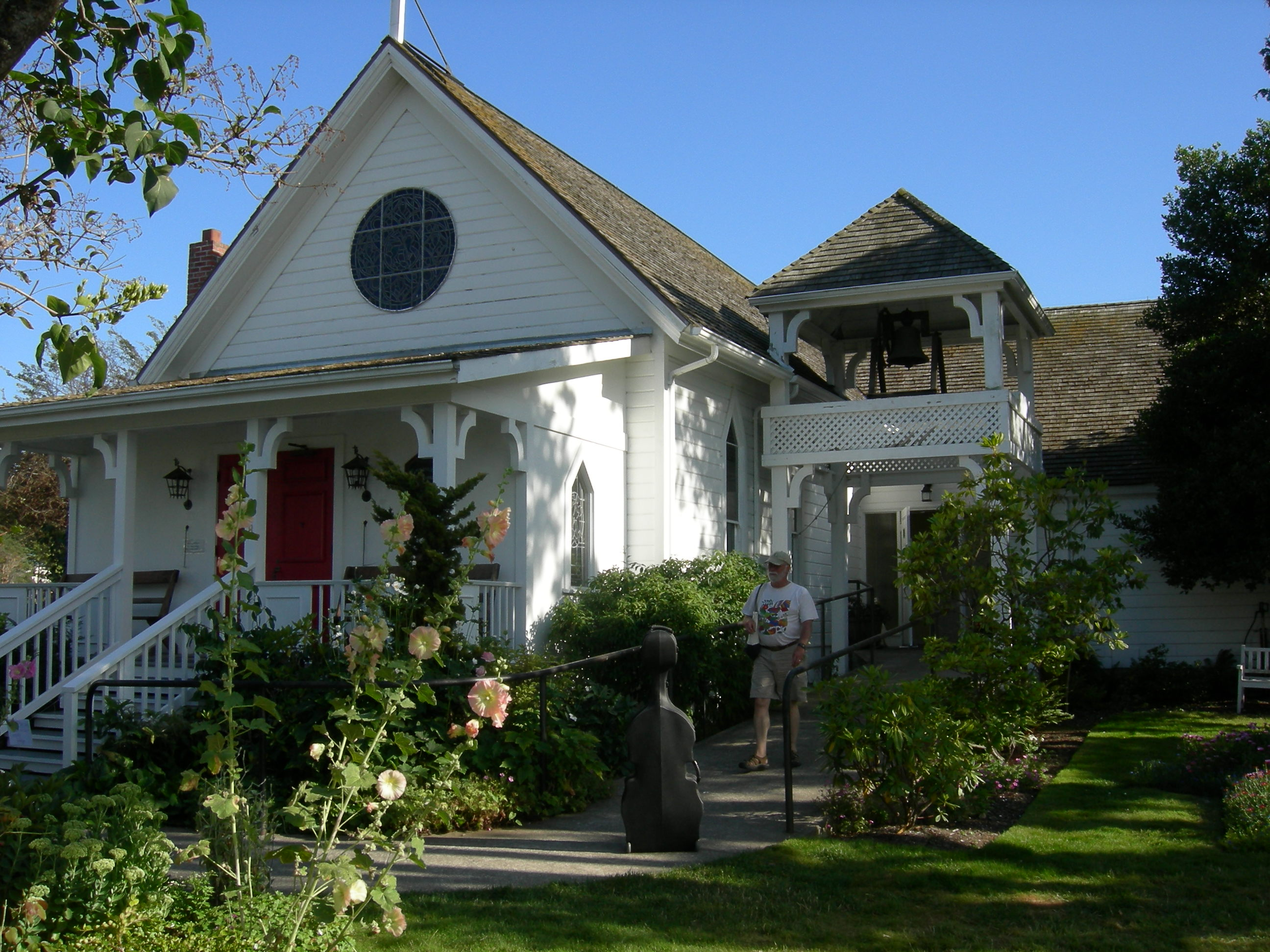
Emmanuel Episcopal Church, Eastsound, Orcas Island Washington

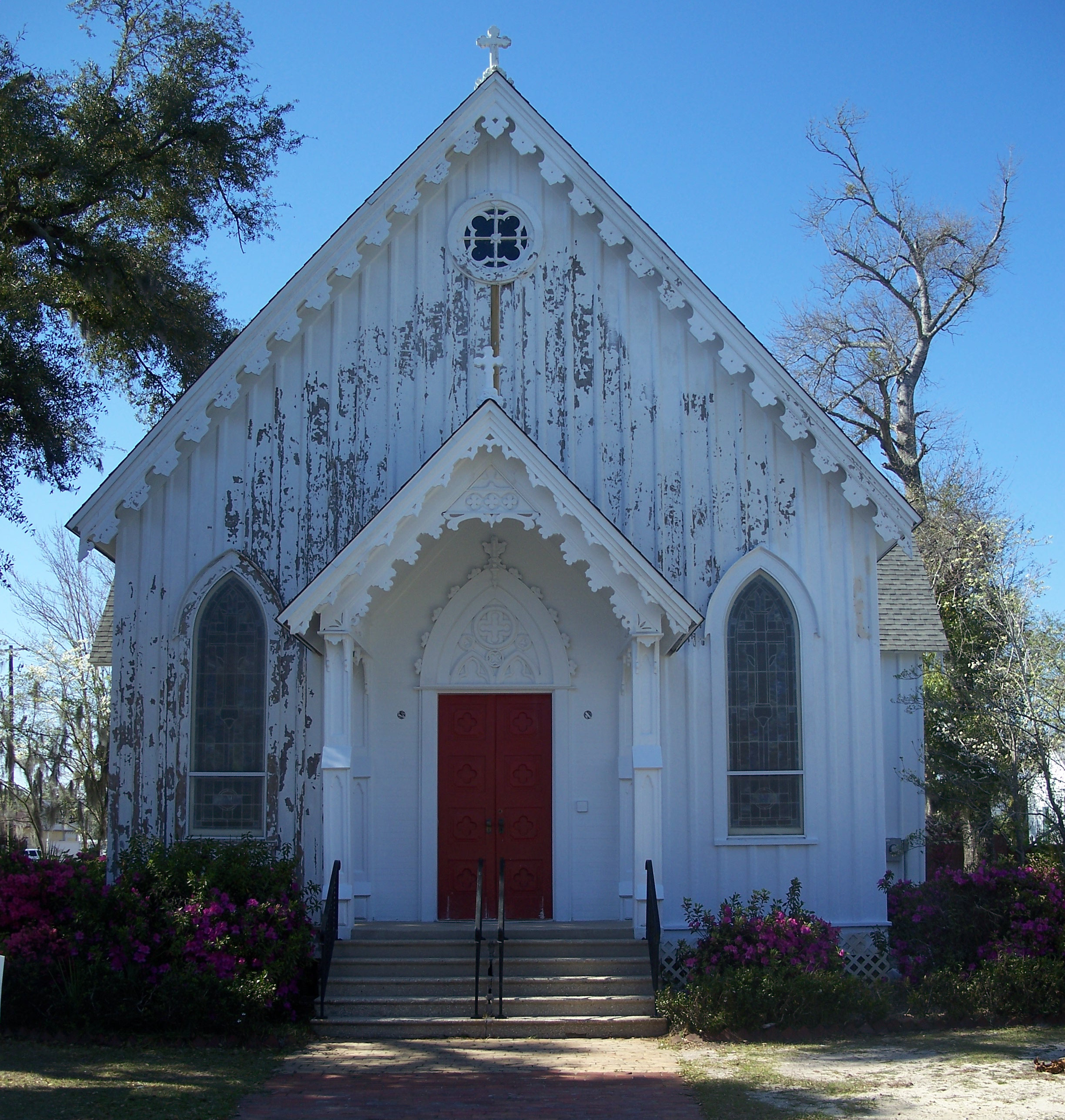
St Mary's Episcopal Church and Rectory, Milton, Florida

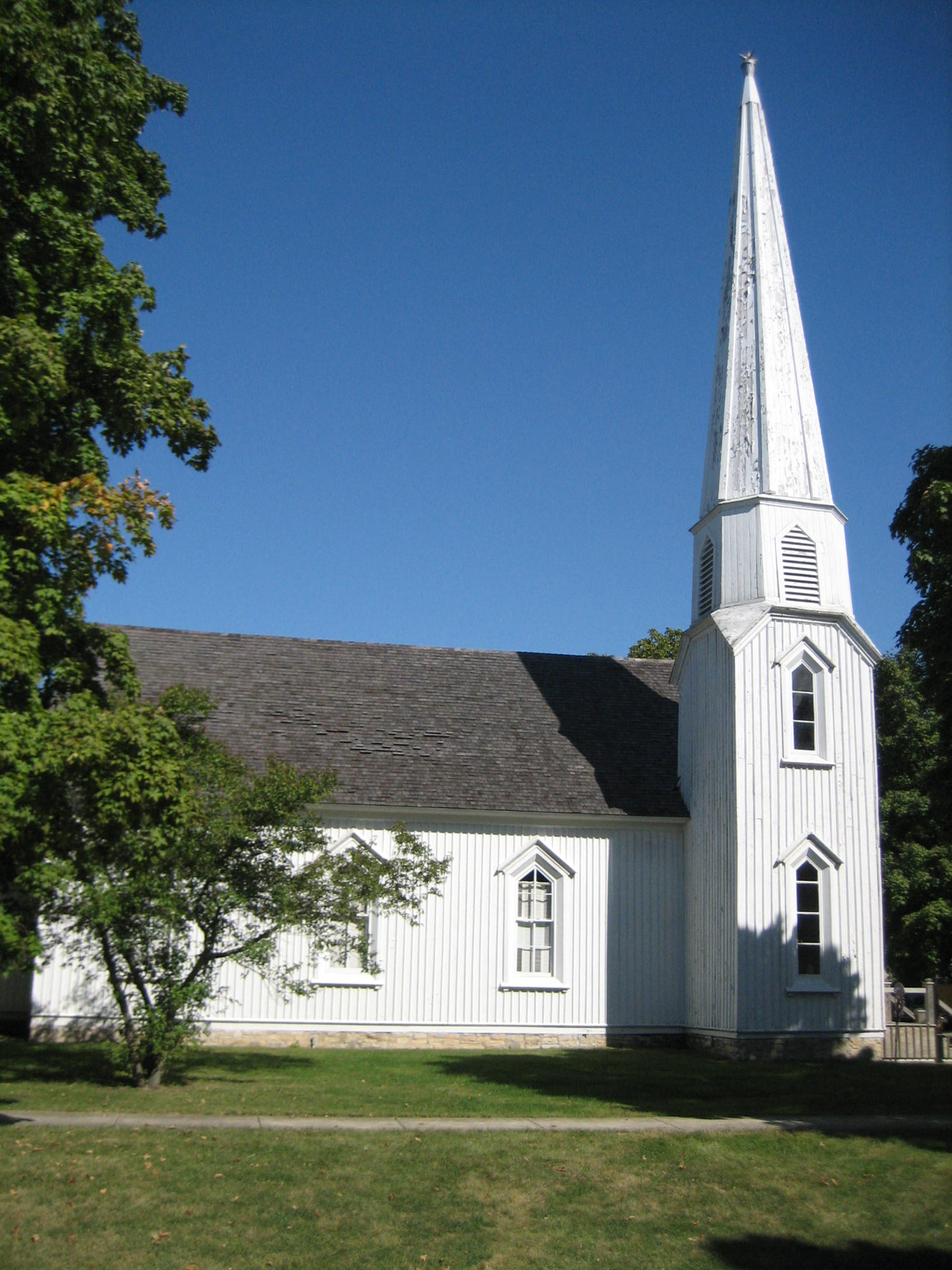
Pioneer Gothic Church, Dwight, Illinois, originally a Presbyterian church

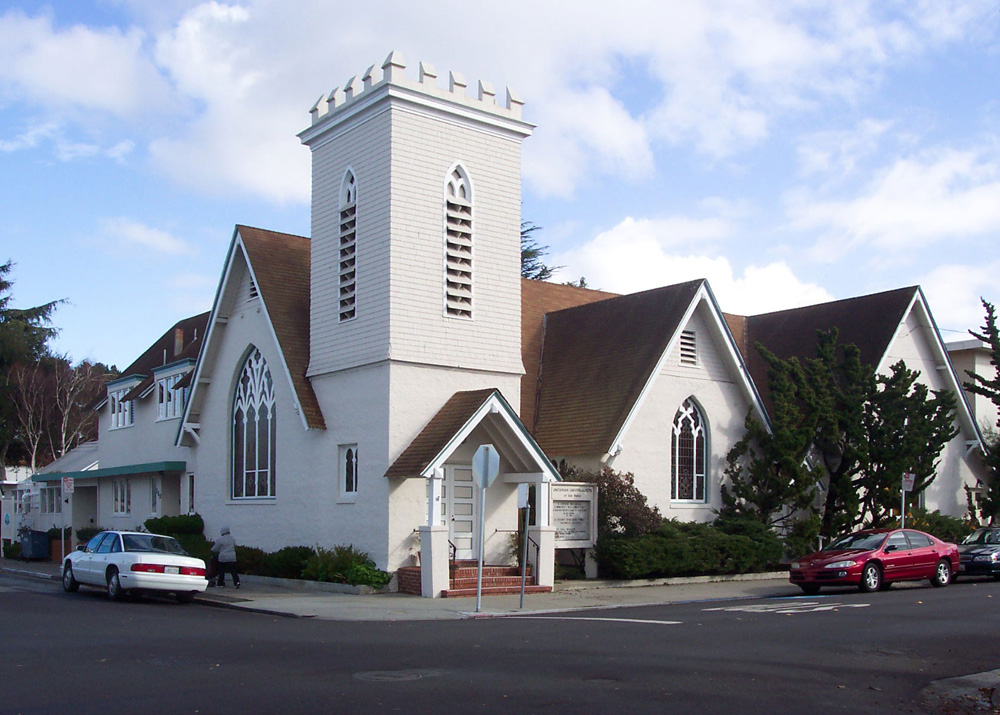
Unitarian Universalists of San Mateo, California, California, originally a Methodist church

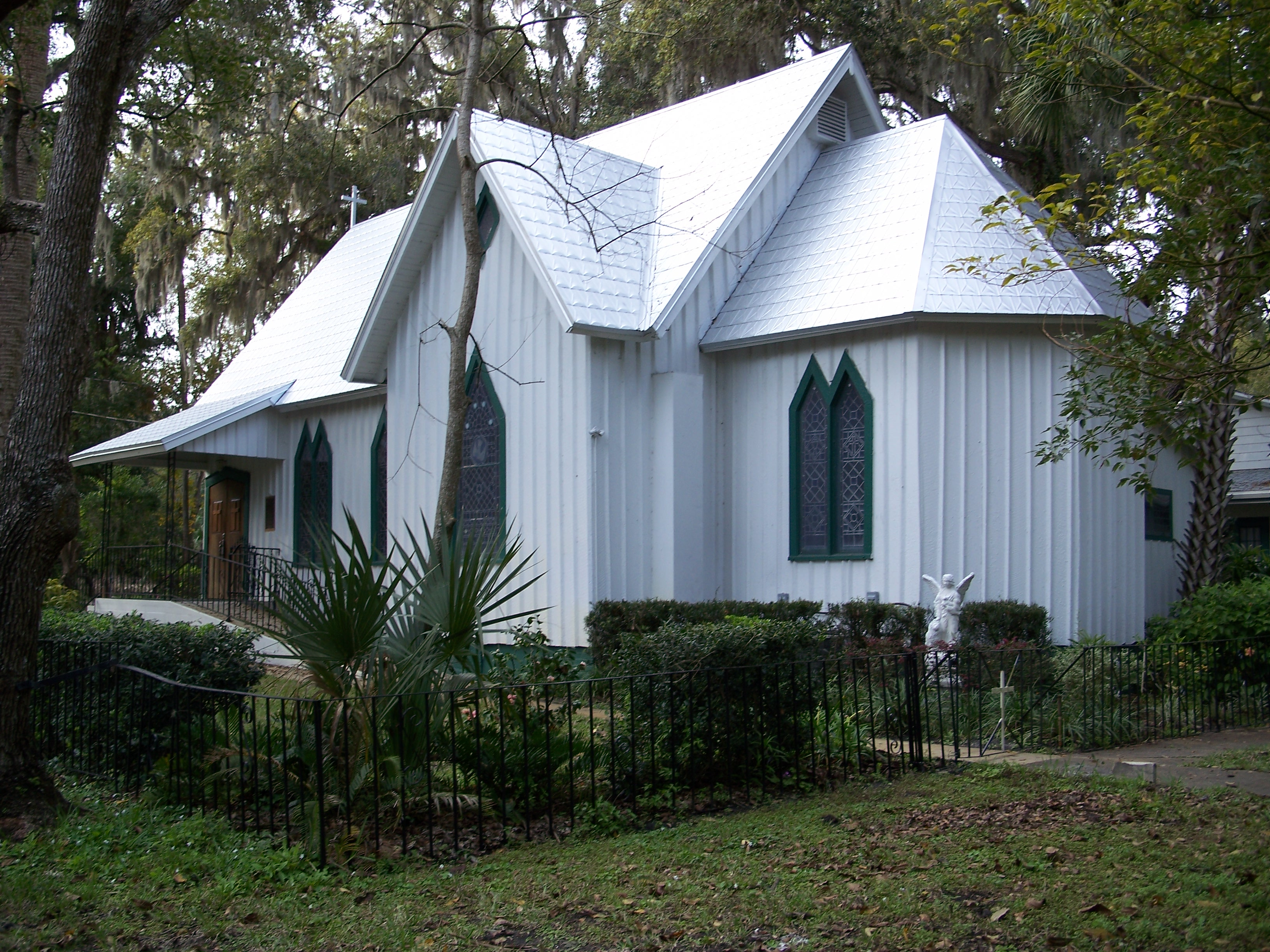
All Saints Episcopal Church, Enterprise, Florida

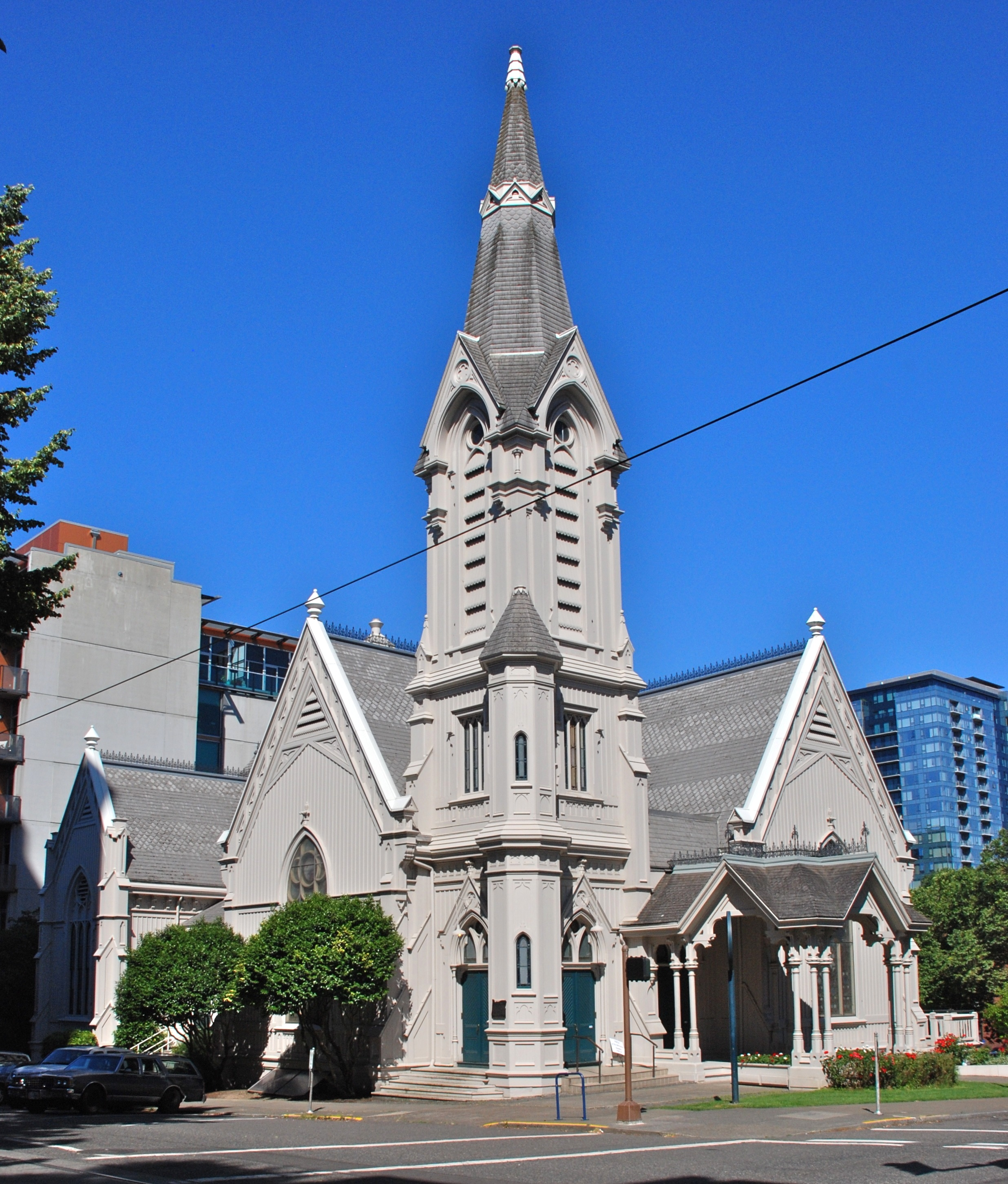
The Old Church, Portland, Oregon originally Calvary Presbyterian Church

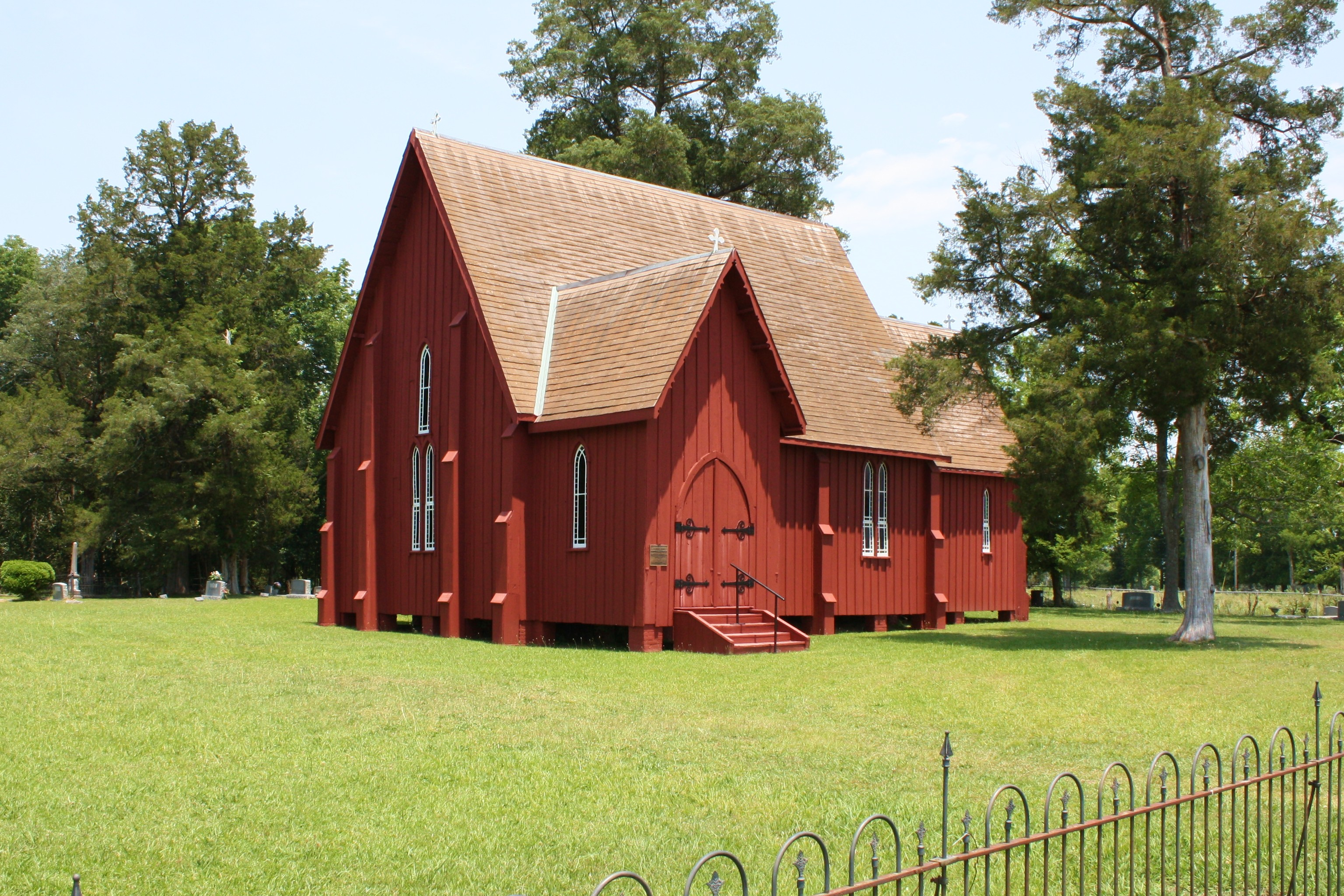
St. Andrew's Episcopal Church, Prairieville, Alabama Note the buttresses.

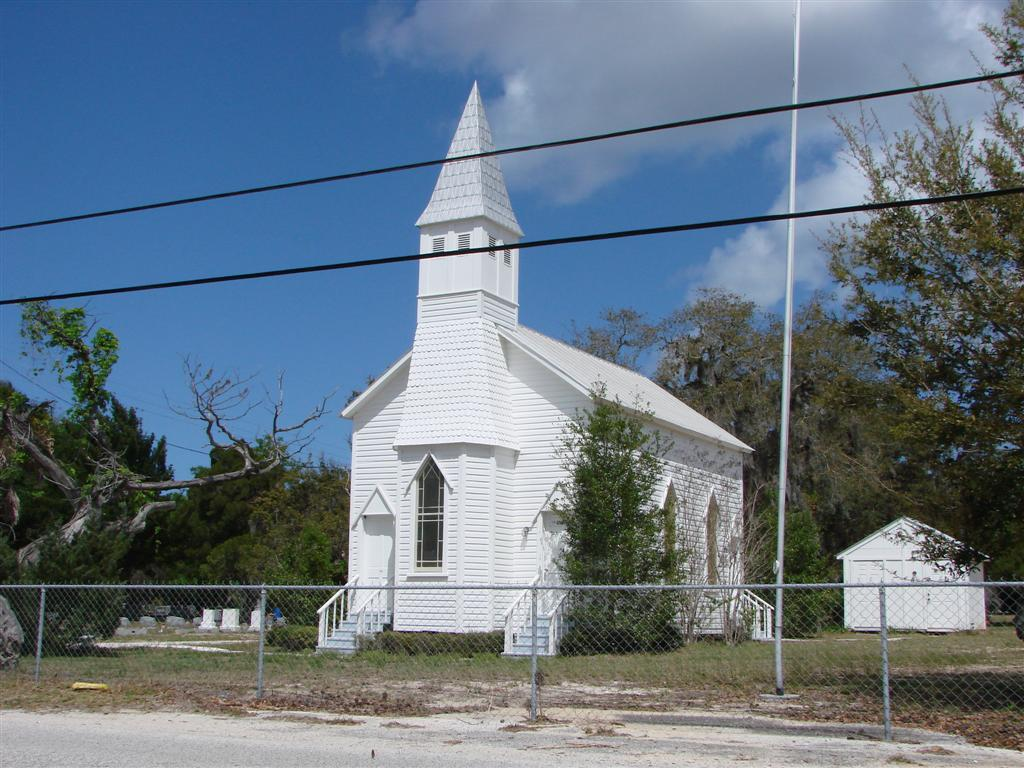
La Grange Church, Titusville, Florida, originally non-denominational Protestant

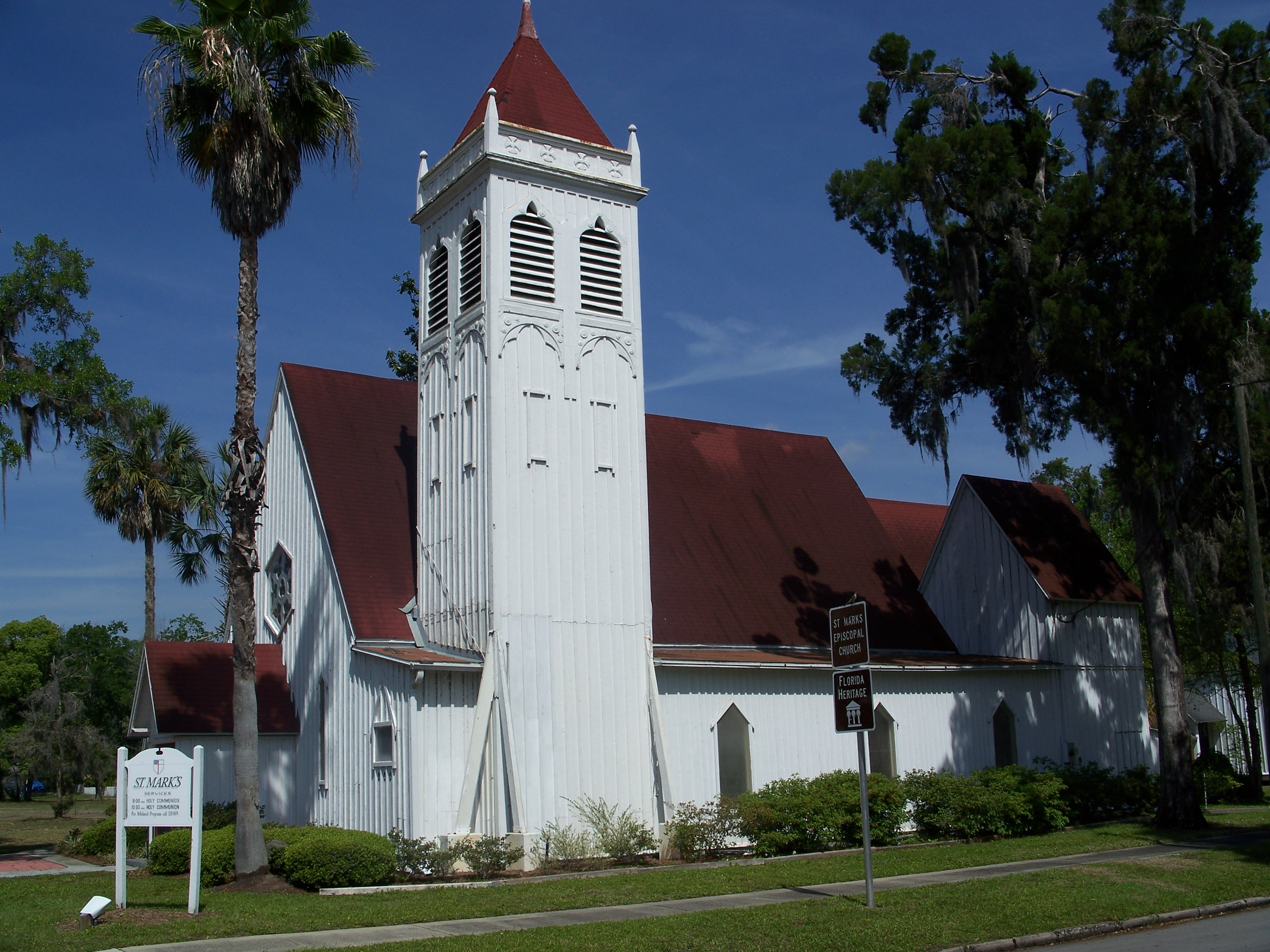
St. Mark's Episcopal Church, Palatka, Florida. Note the buttresses at the base of the belfry.

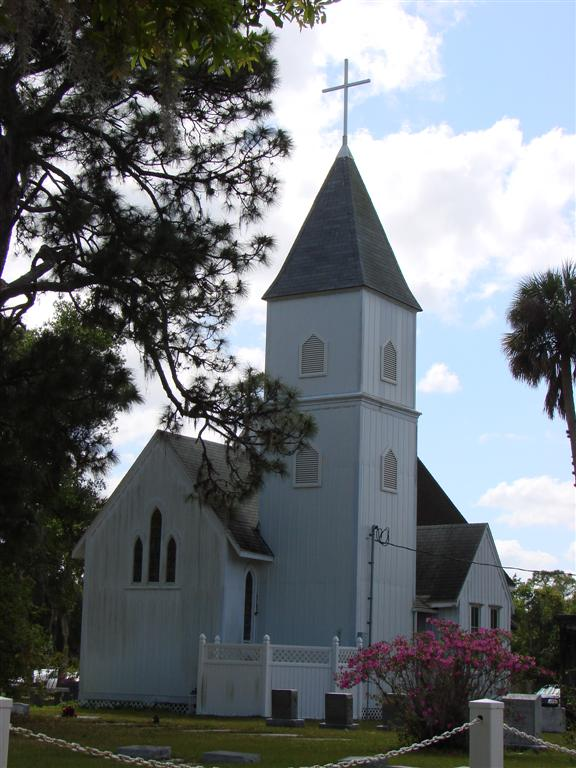
St. Luke's Episcopal Church and Cemetery, Courtenay, Florida

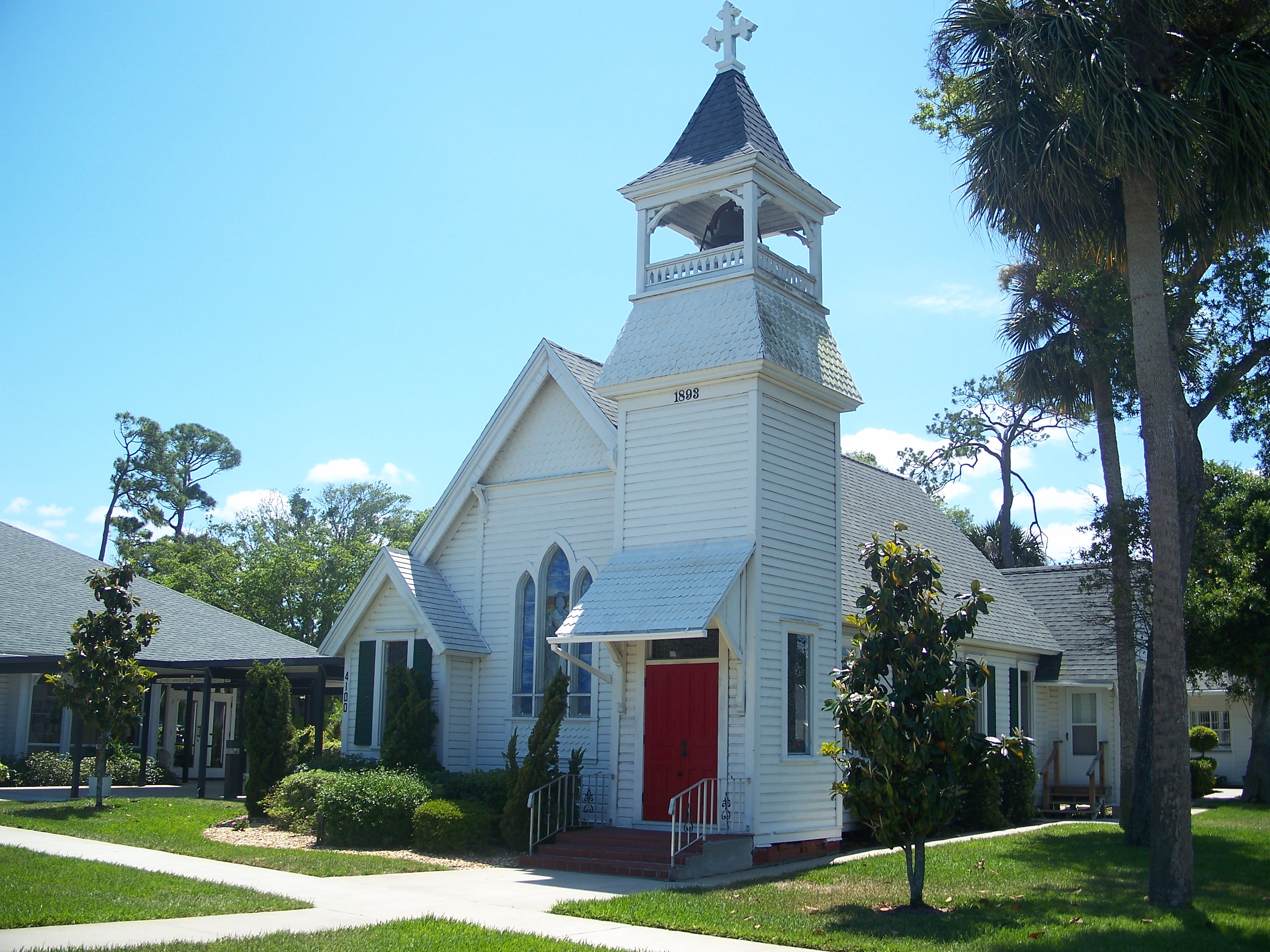
Grace Episcopal Church and Guild Hall. Port Orange, Florida)

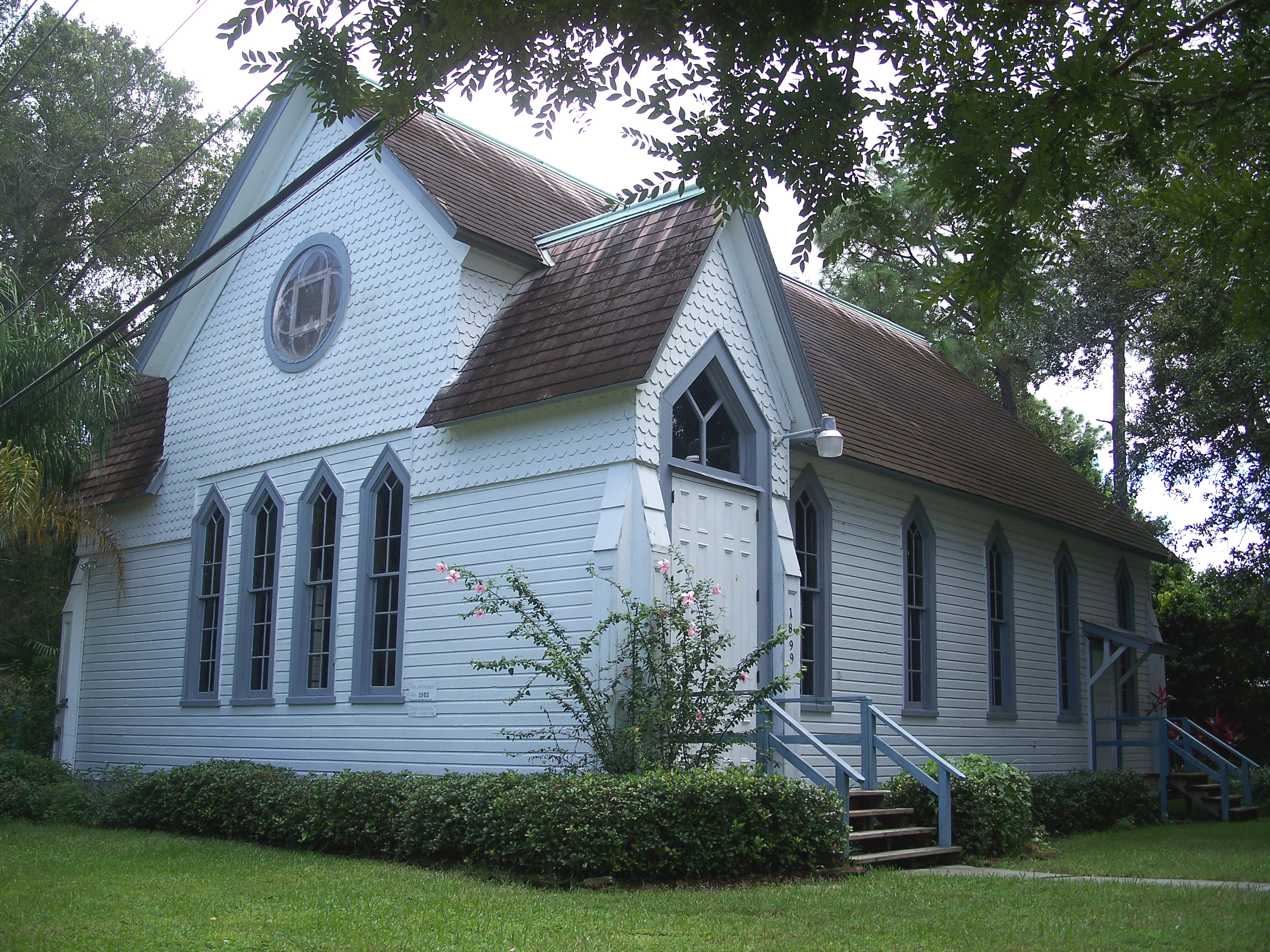
Andrews Memorial Chapel, Dunedin, Florida), originally a Presbyterian church

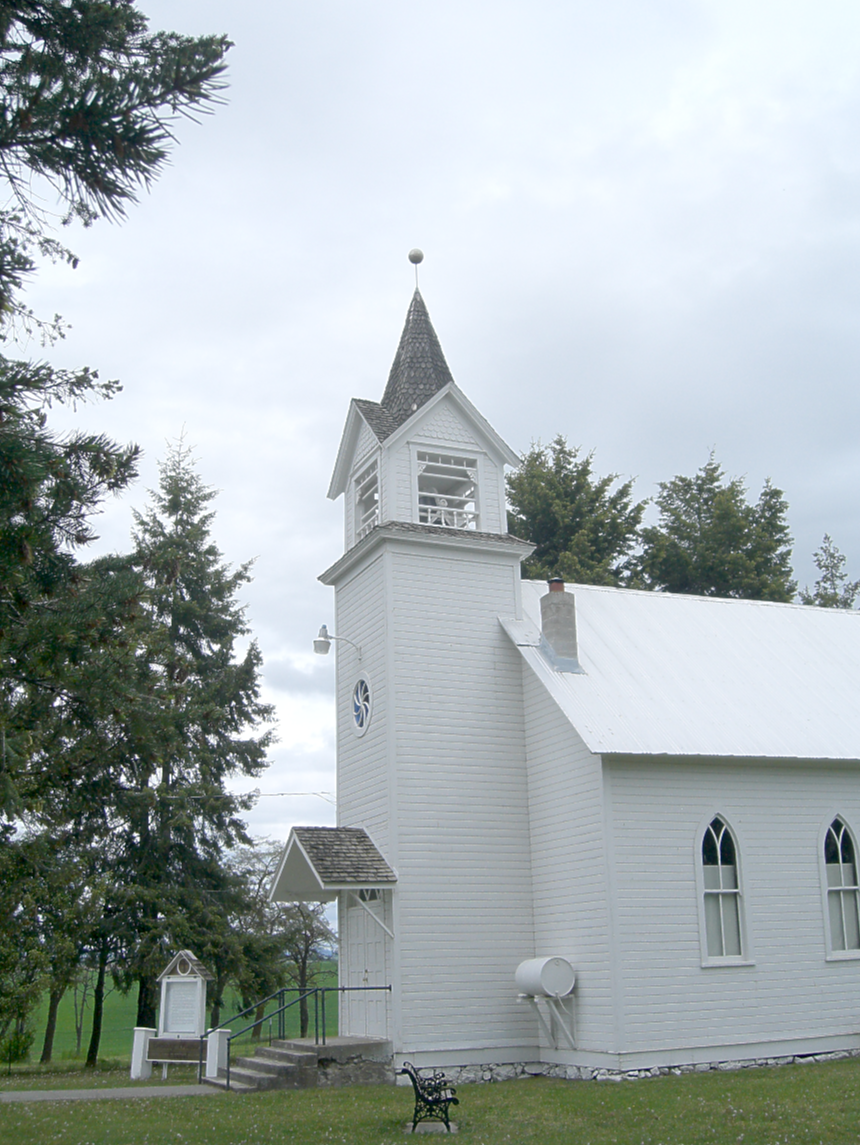
Bethany Memorial Chapel, Kendrick, Idaho, originally a Norwegian Lutheran church

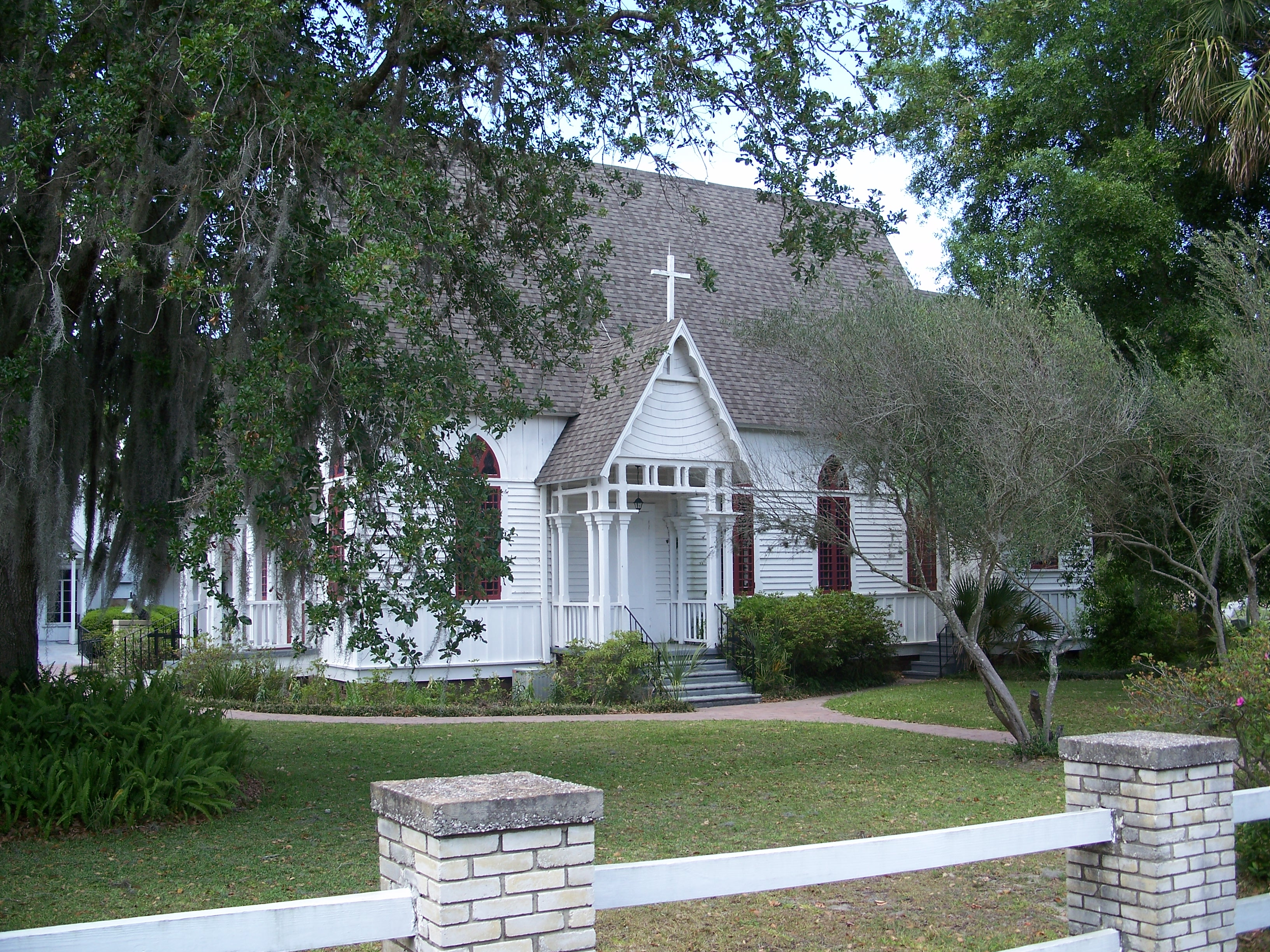
Holy Trinity Episcopal Church, Fruitland Park, Florida

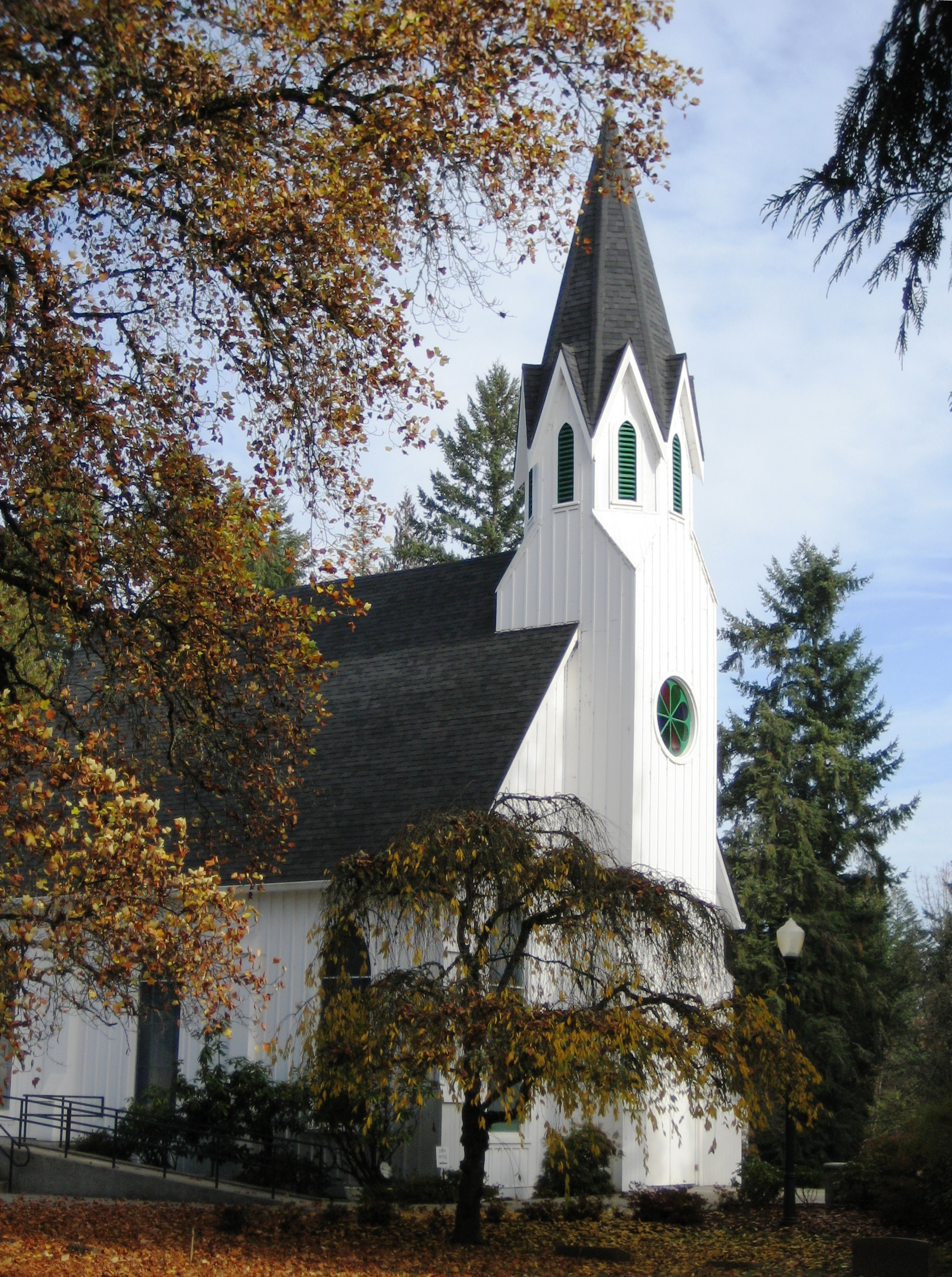
Tualatin Plains Presbyterian Church, Hillsboro, Oregon

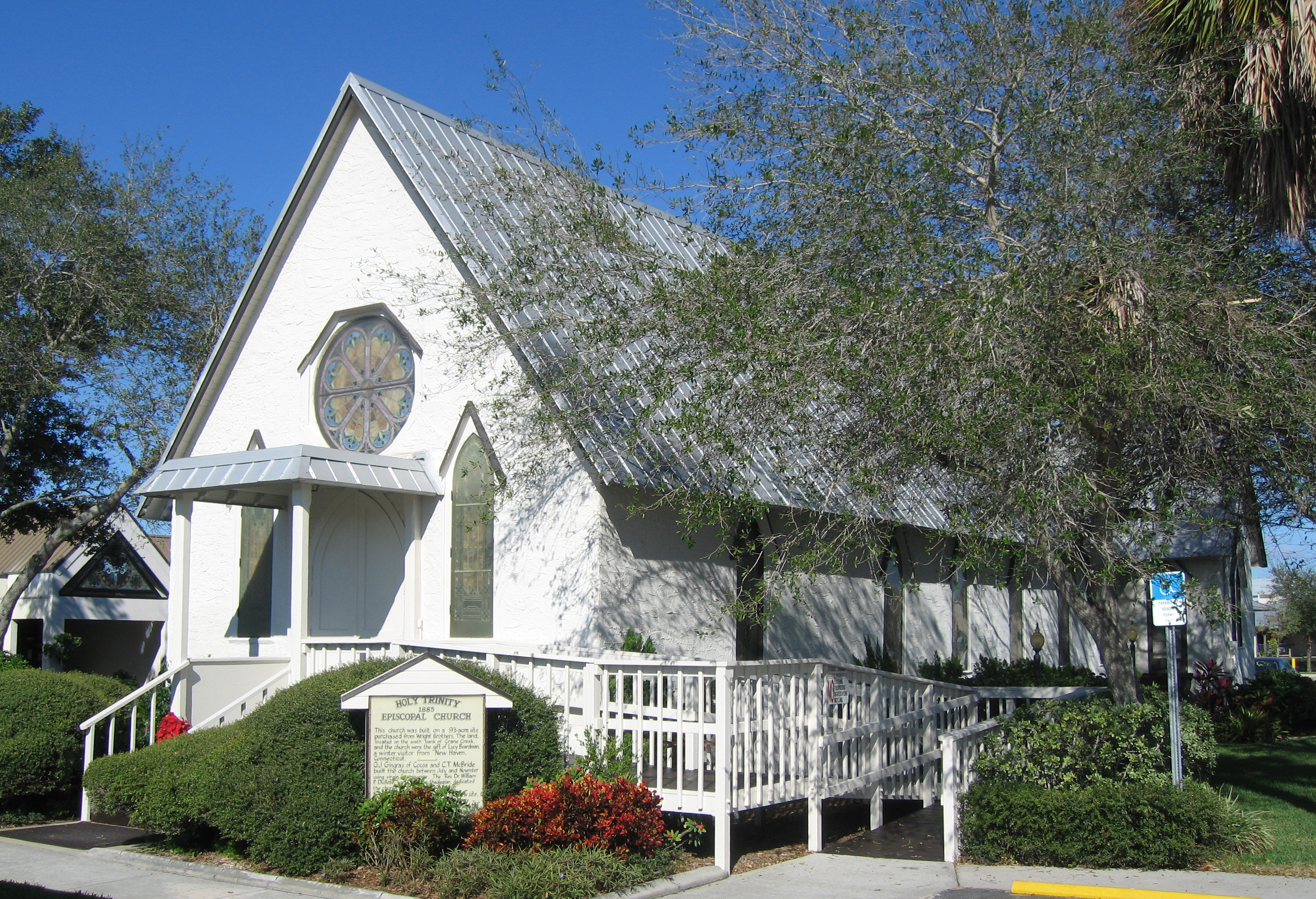
Chapel of Holy Trinity Episcopal Church, Melbourne, Florida

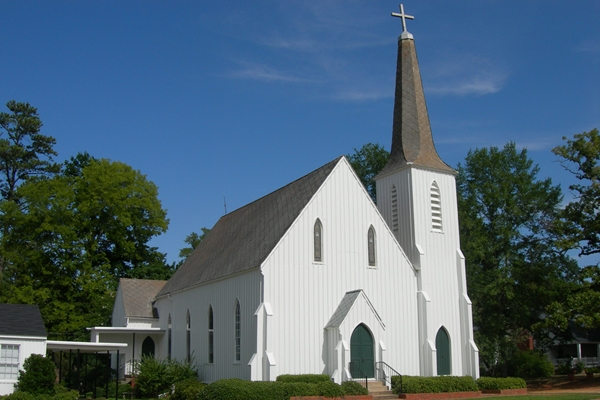
St. Paul's Episcopal Church, Lowndesboro, Alabama

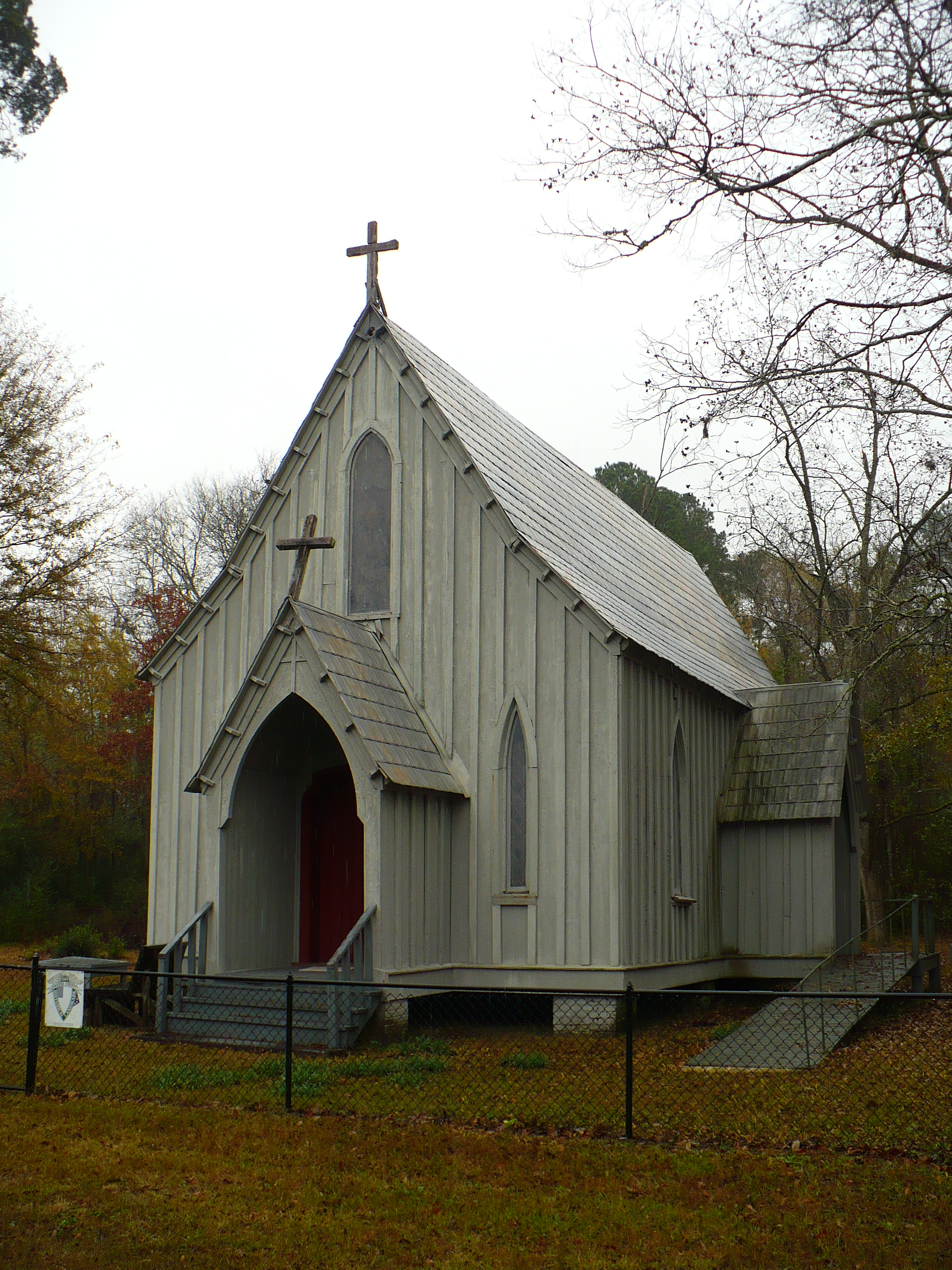
St. John's-In-The-Prairie Episcopal Church, Forkland, Alabama

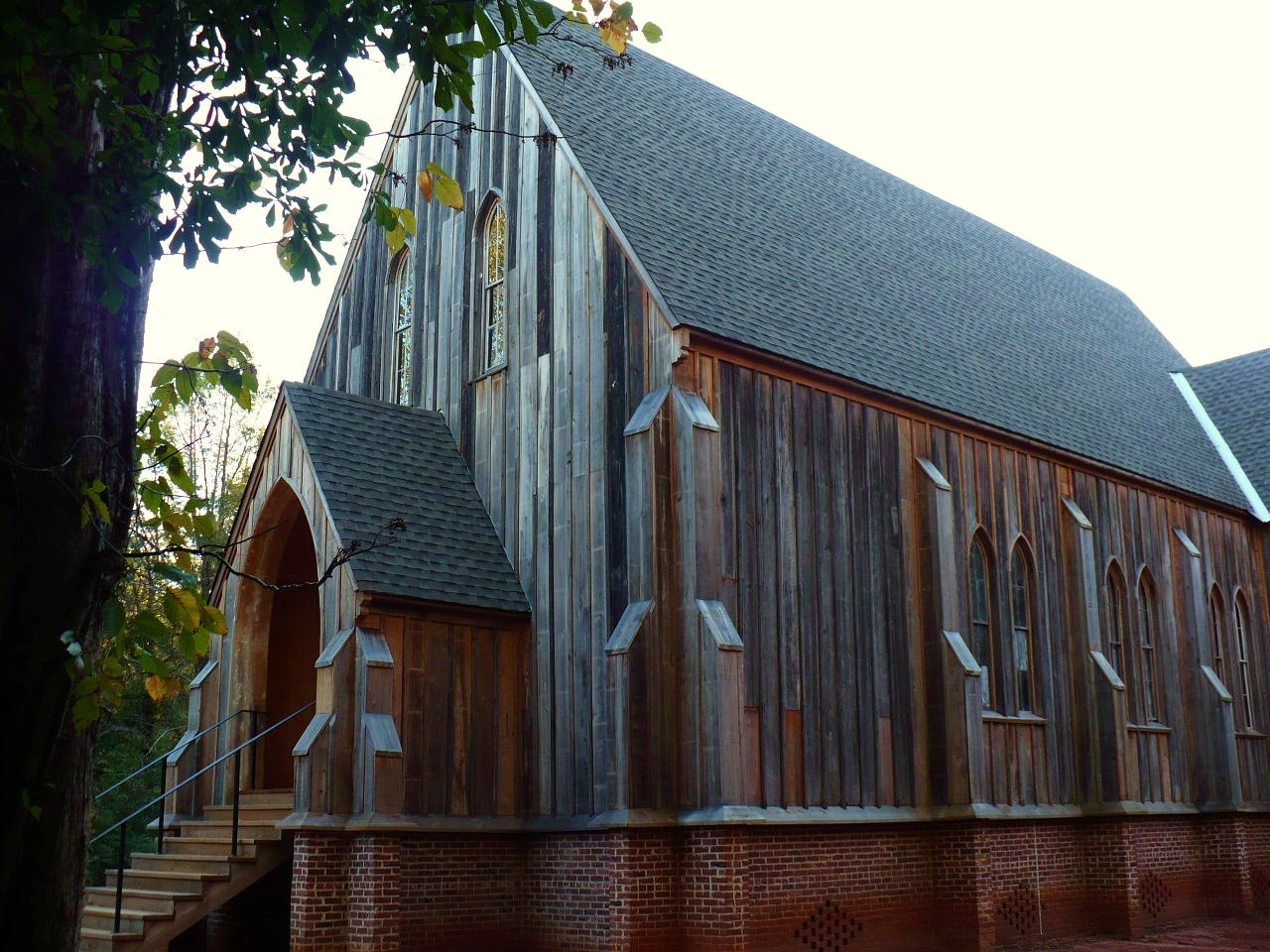
St. Luke's Episcopal Church, Cahaba, Alabama

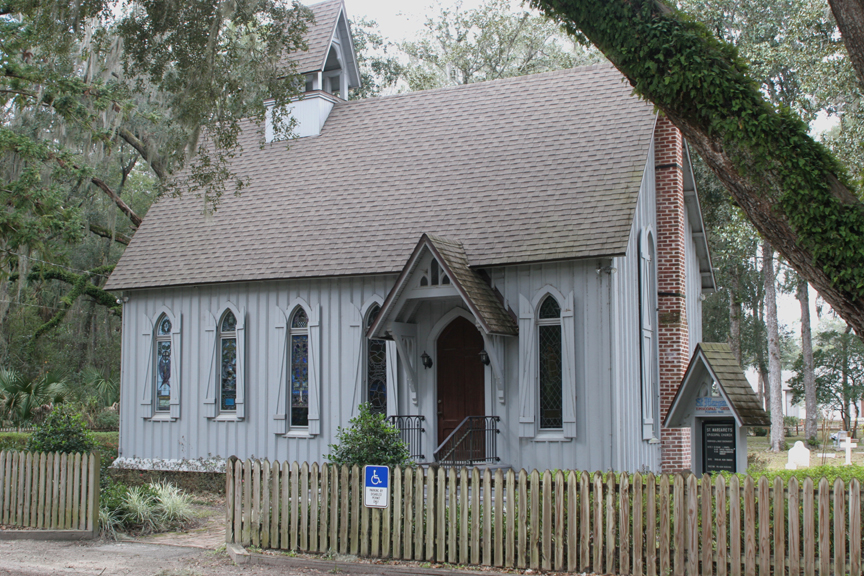
St. Margaret's Episcopal Church, Hibernia, Florida

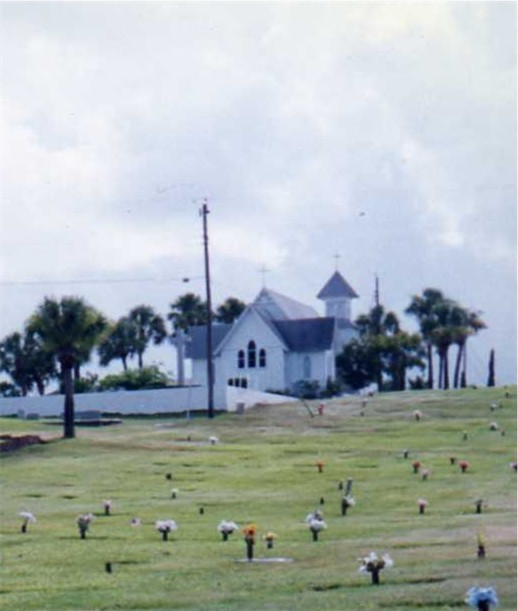
All Saints Episcopal Church, Waveland (Jensen Beach), Florida

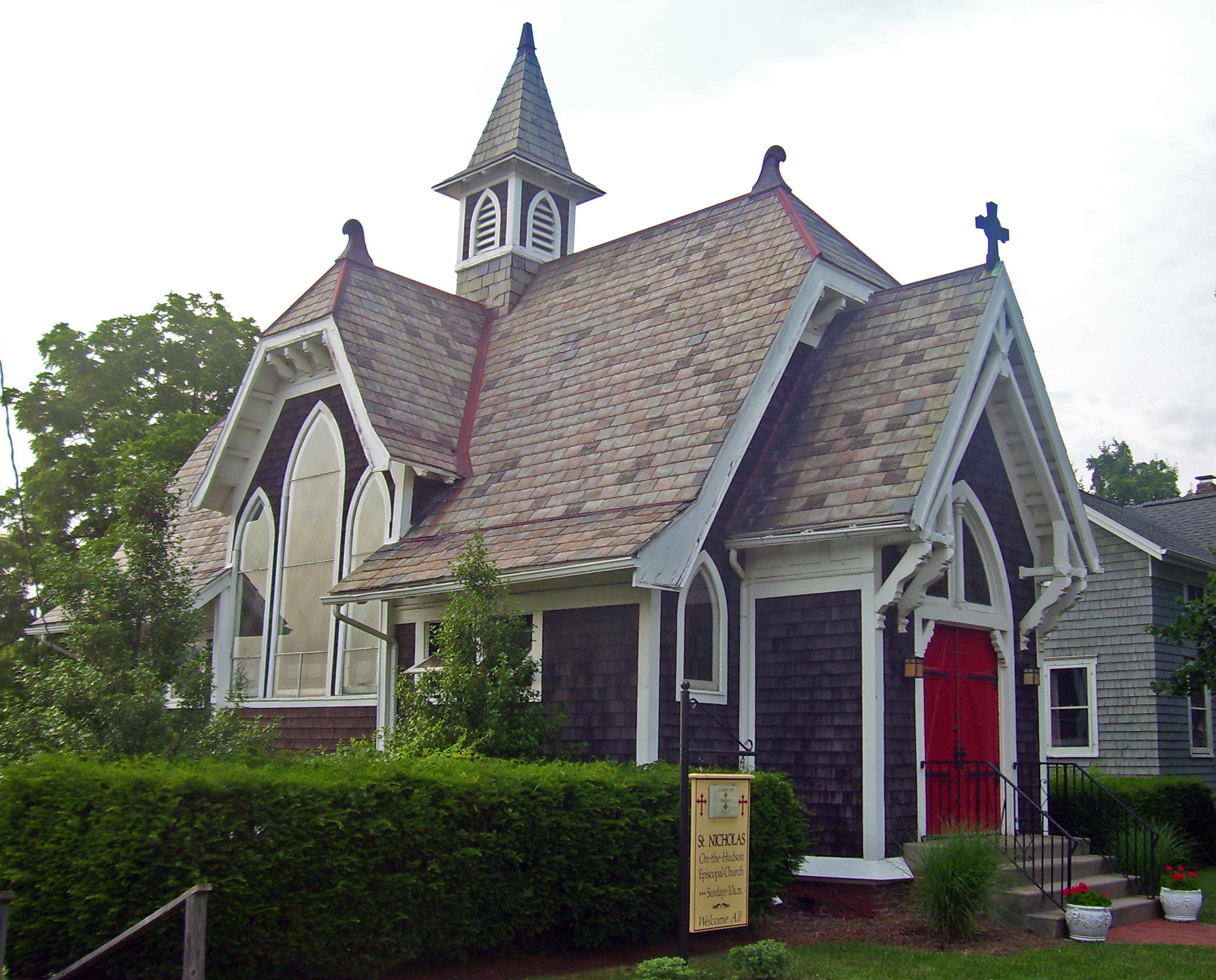
St. Nicholas Chapel, New Hamburg, New York

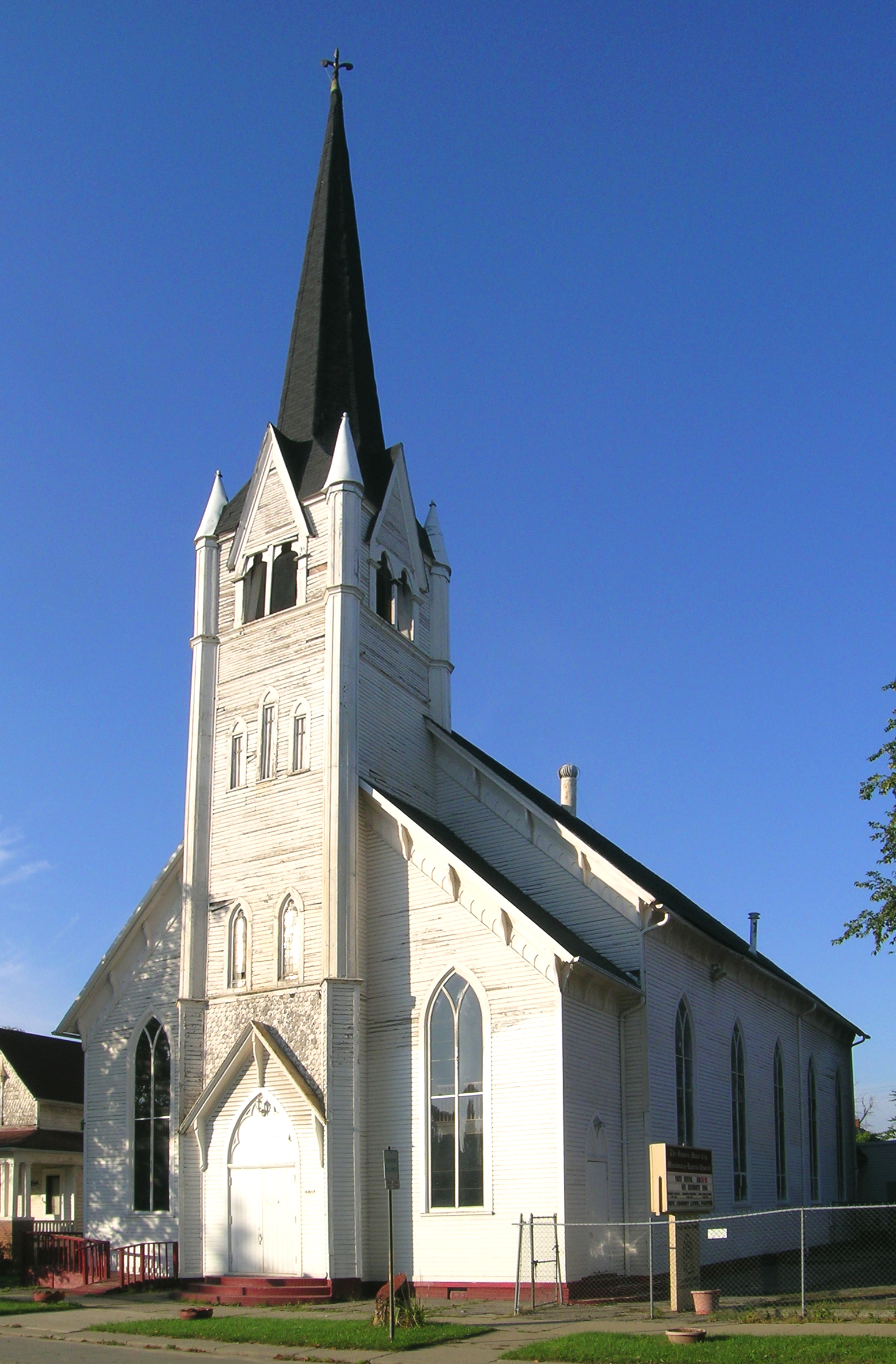
Gethsemane Evangelical Lutheran Church, Detroit, Michigan

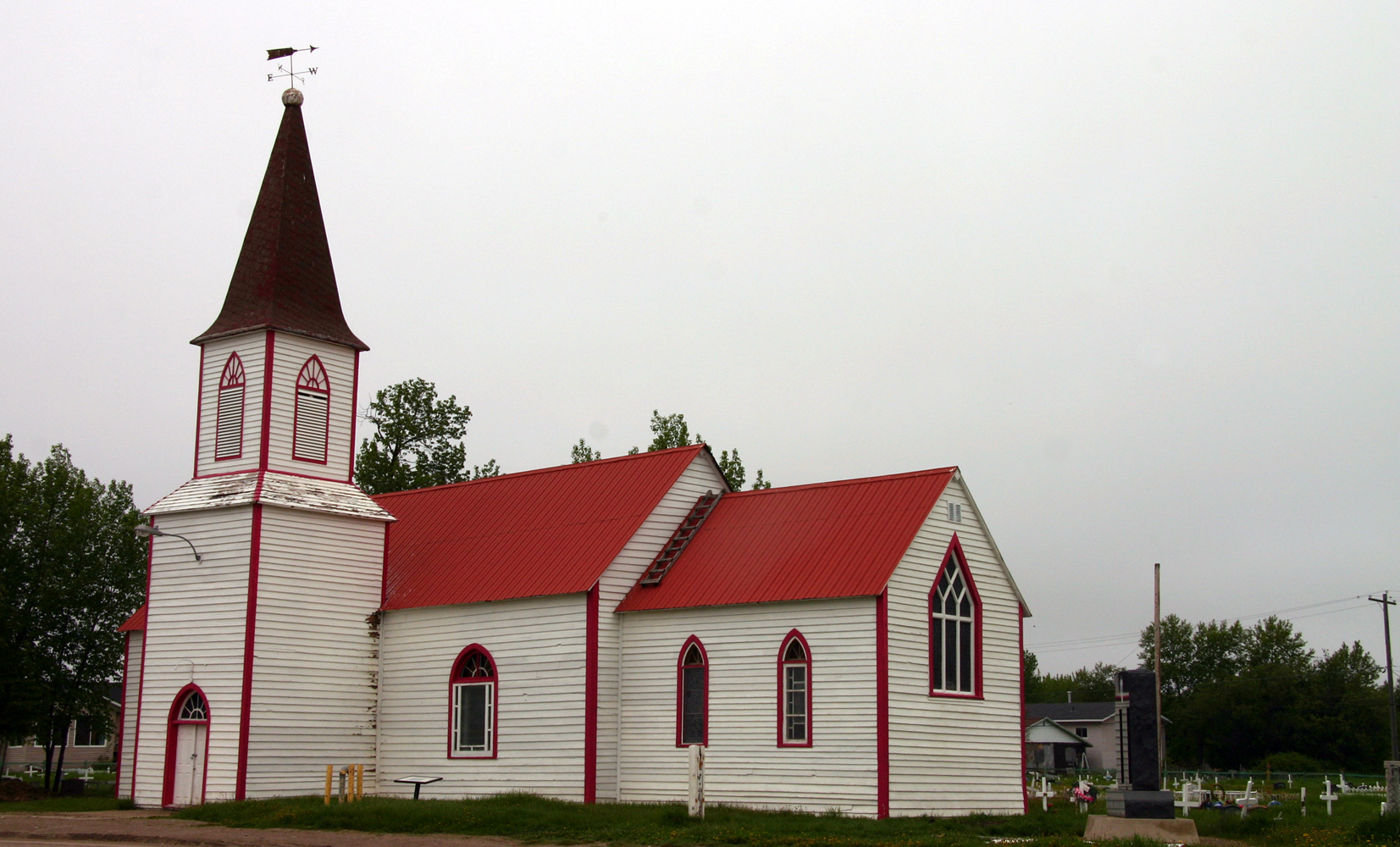
St. Thomas' Anglican Church, Moose Factory, Ontario

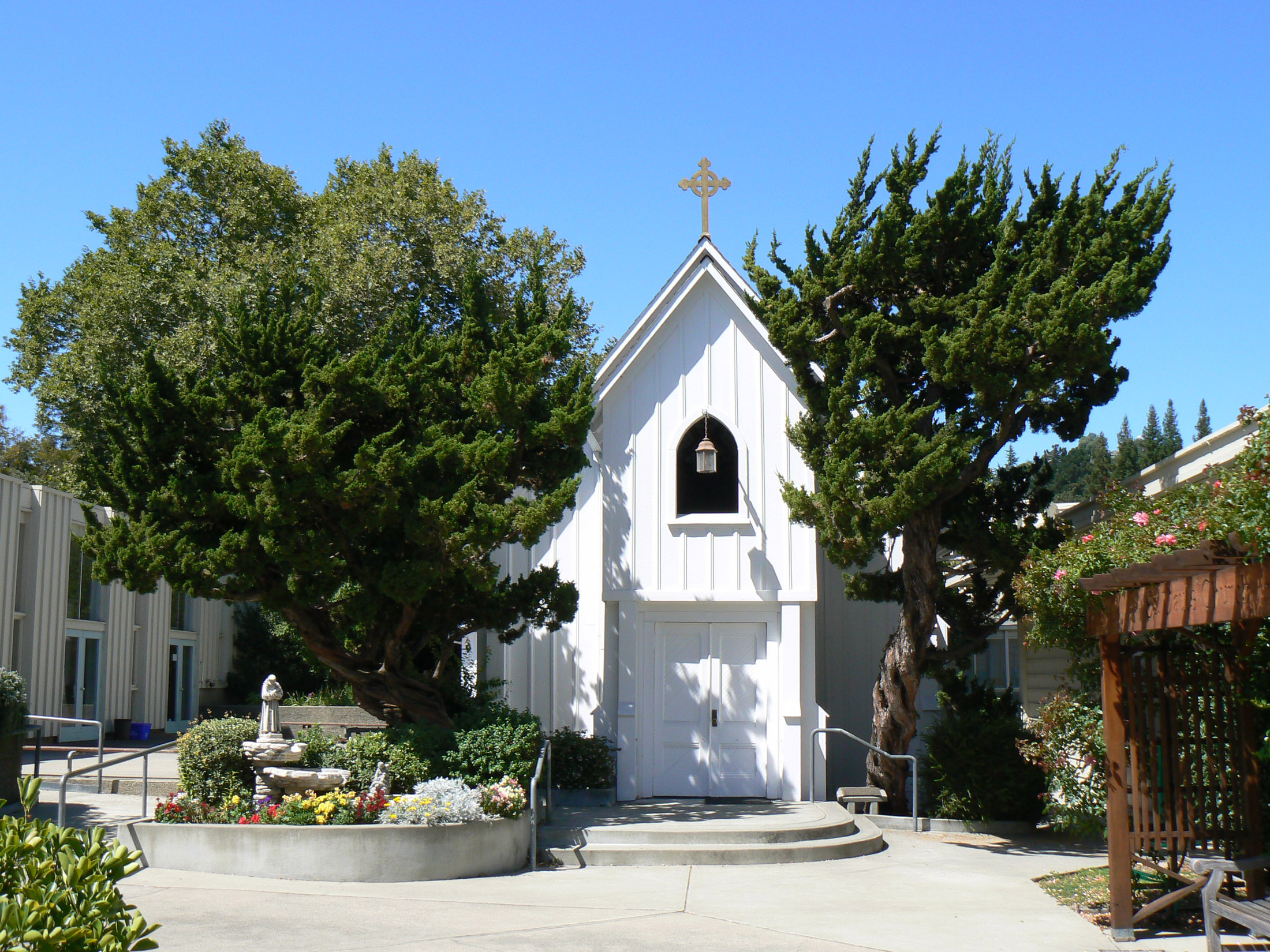
The original St. Paul's Episcopal Church, Walnut Creek, California

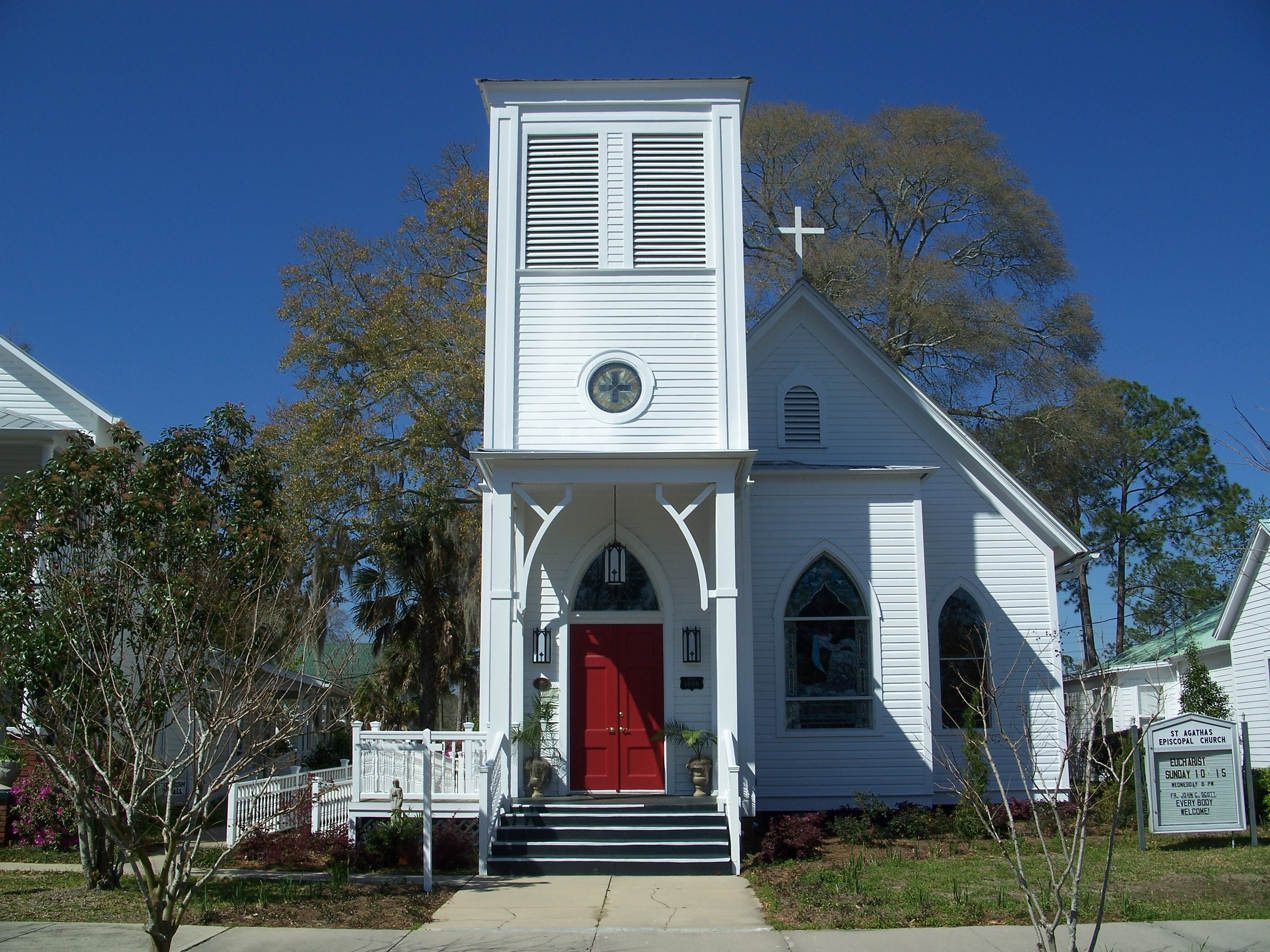
St. Agatha's Episcopal Church, DeFuniak Springs, Florida. Note the unusual tower.

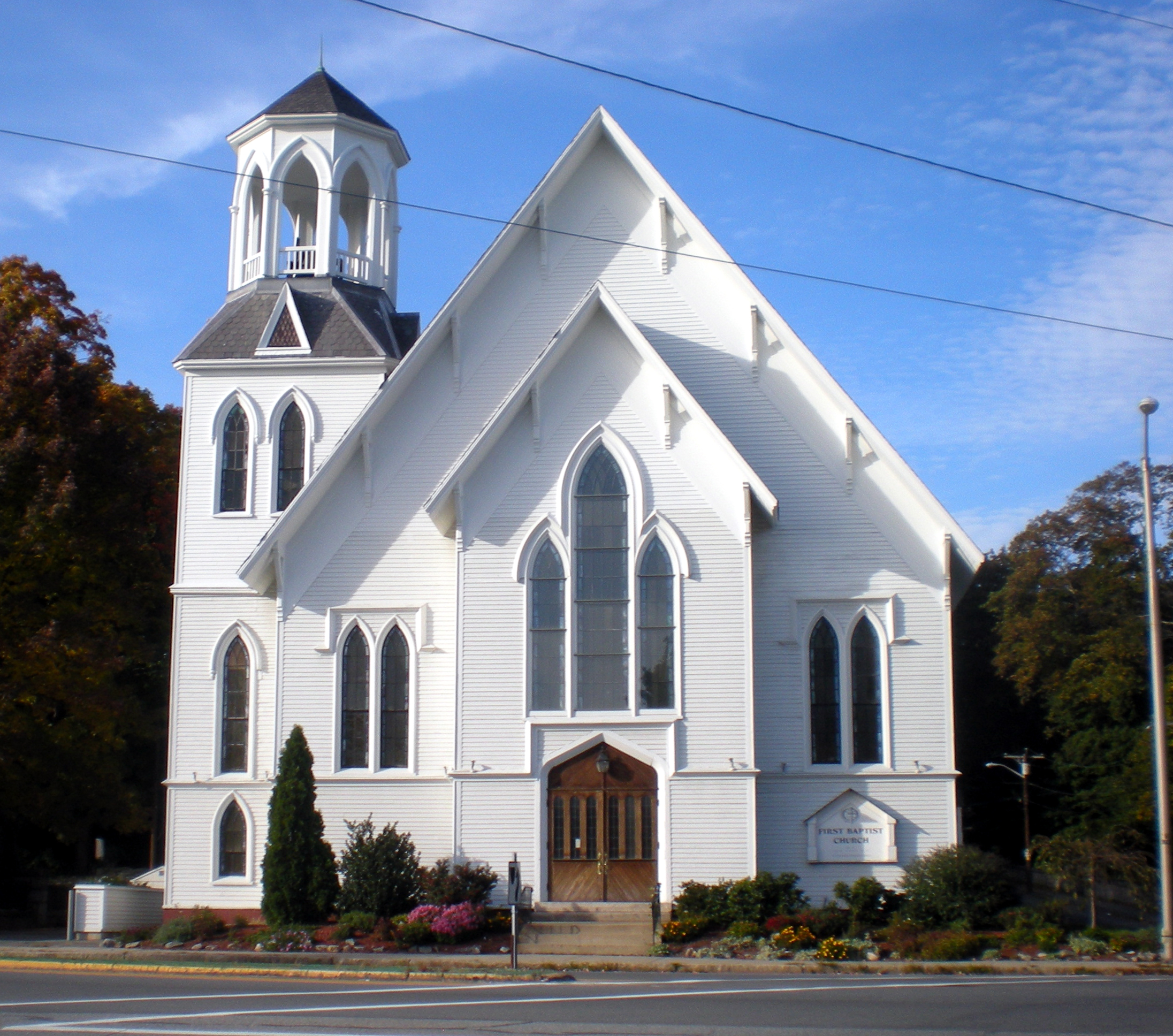
First Baptist Church, Methuen, Massachusetts

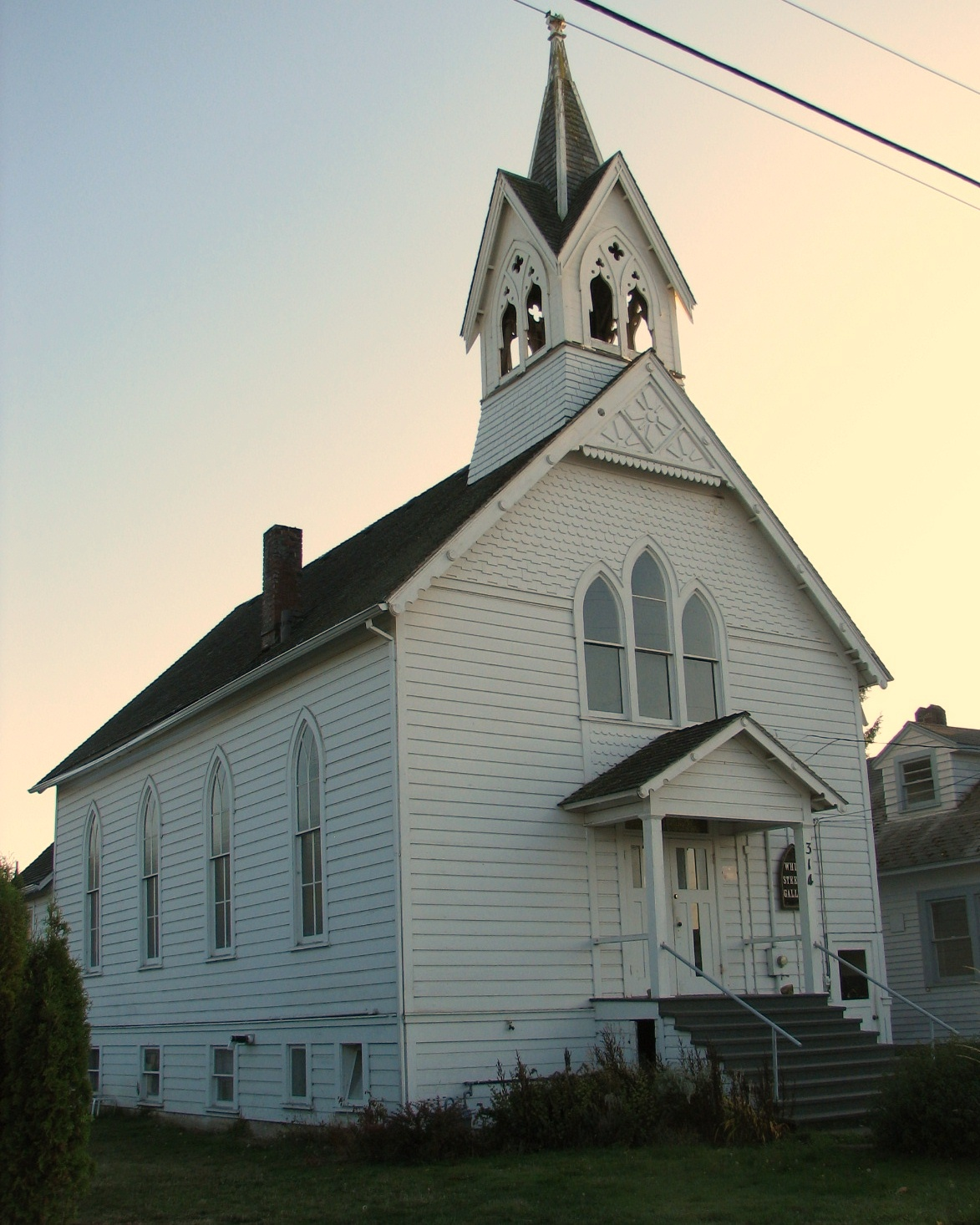
Calvary Lutheran Church, Silverton, Oregon

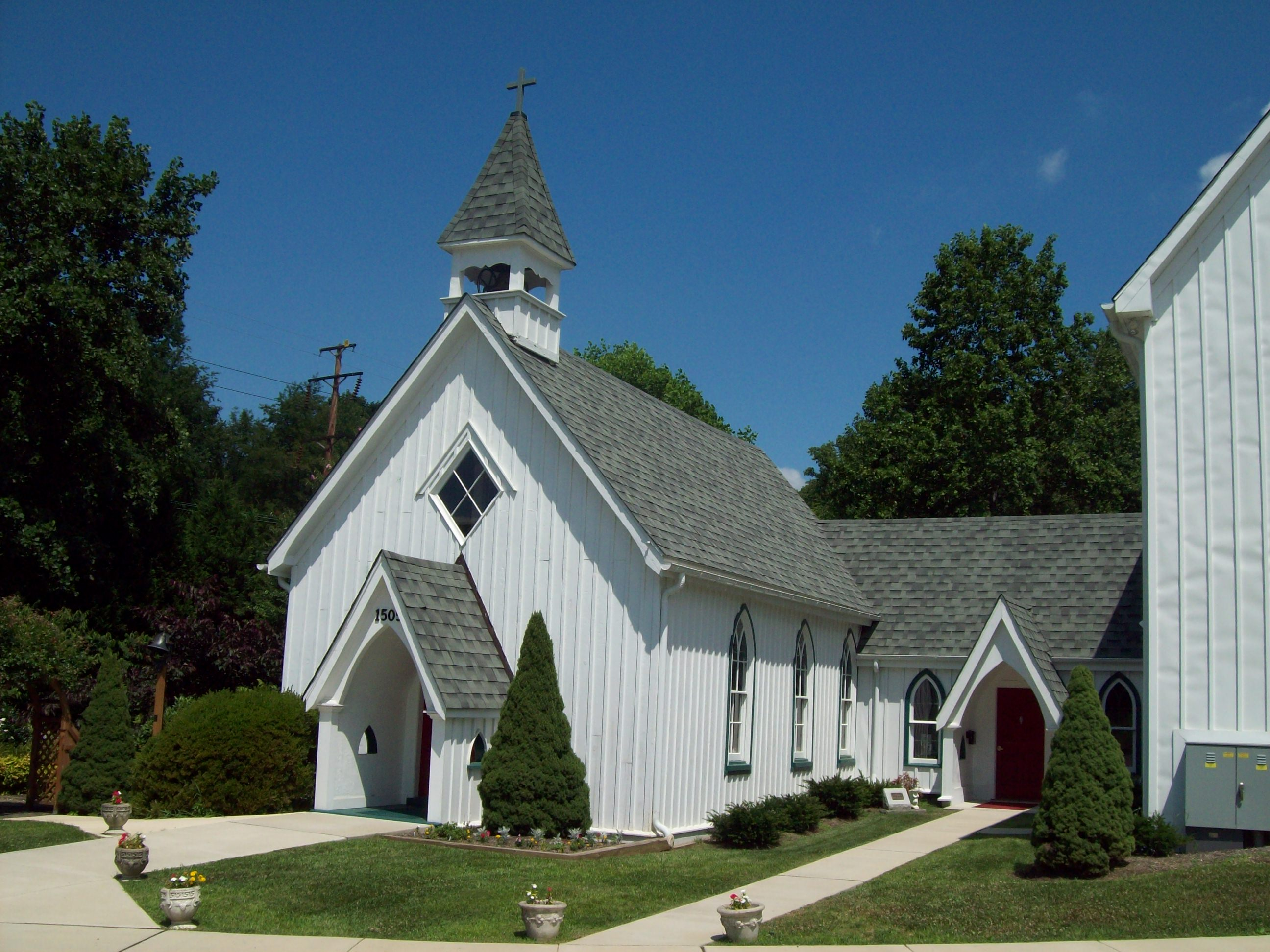
St. Paul's Chapel, Crownsville, Maryland

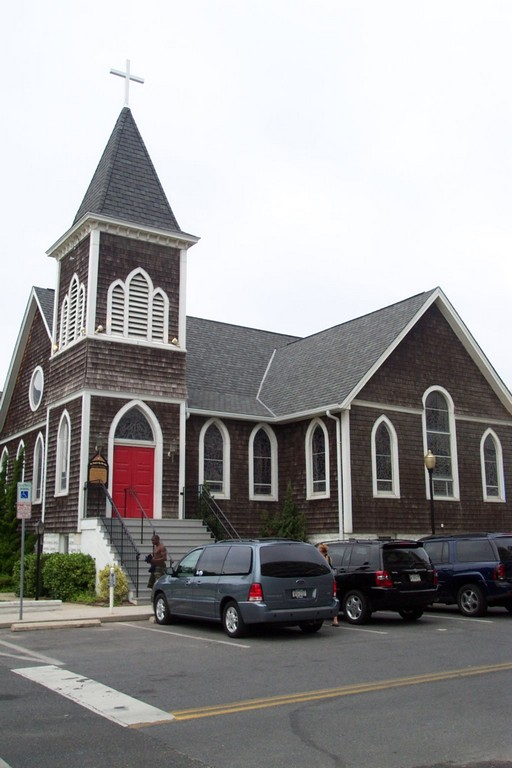
St. Paul's by-the-sea Protestant Episcopal Church, Ocean City, Maryland

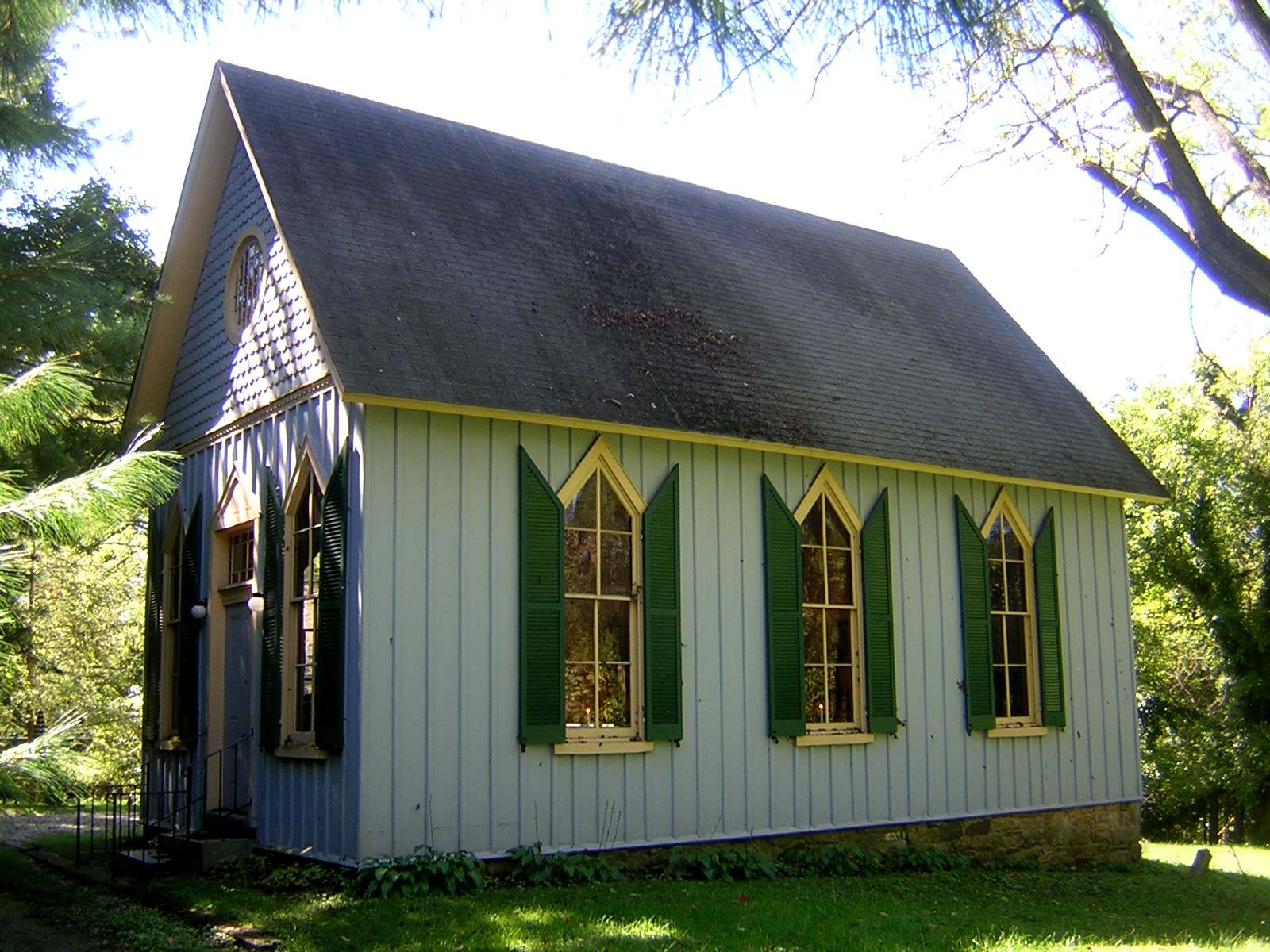
St. John's Church, Ruxton, Maryland

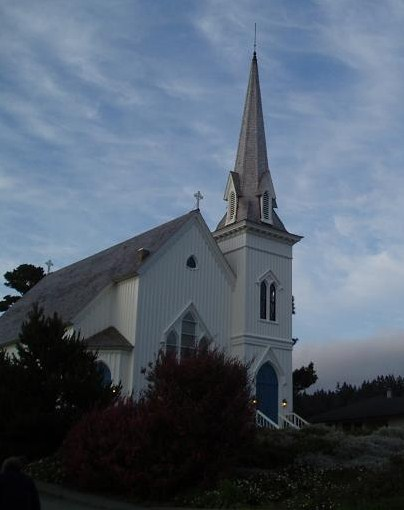
Mendocino Presbyterian Church, Mendocino, California

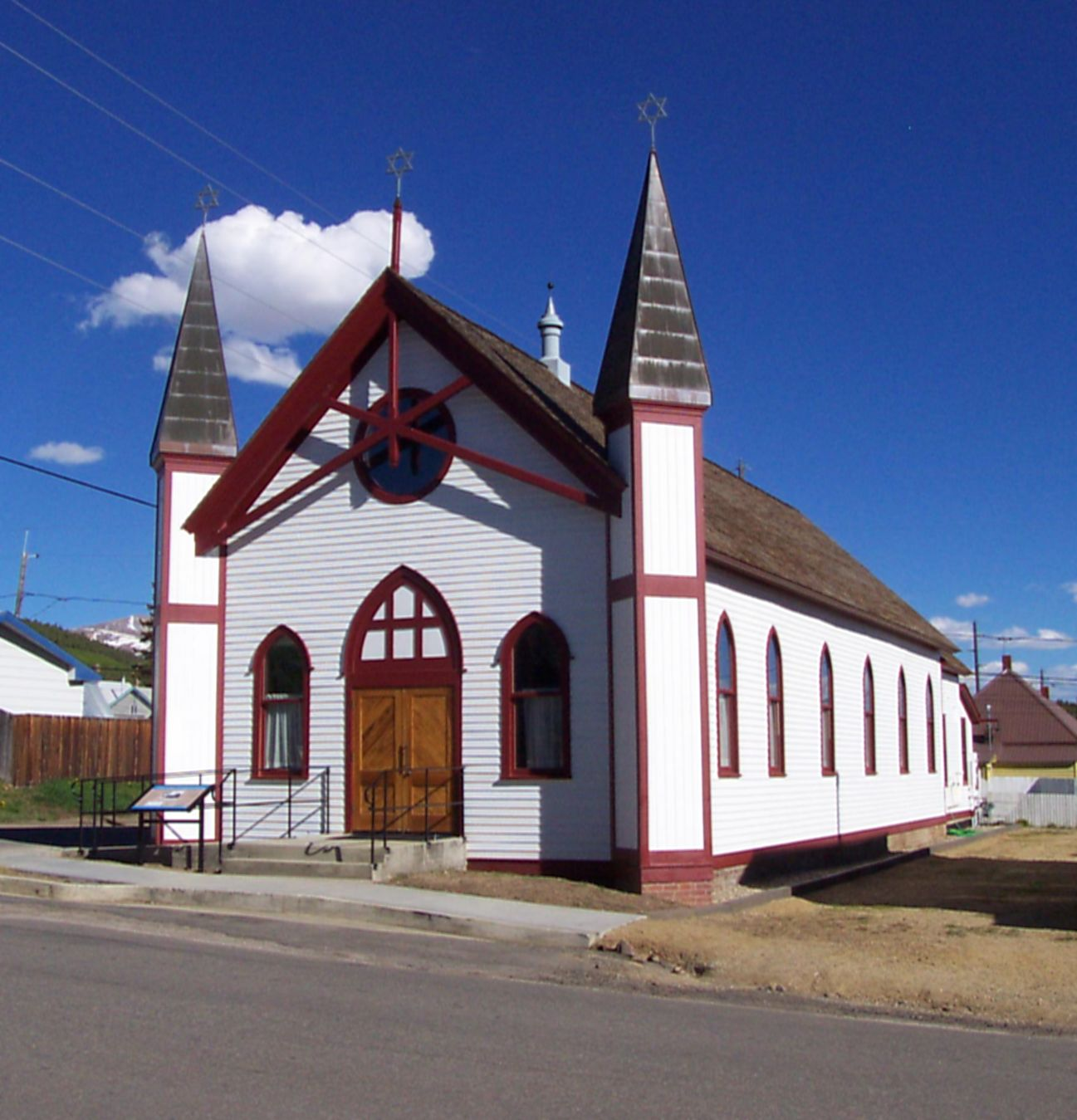
Temple Israel, Leadville, Colorado, 1884 Reform synagogue.

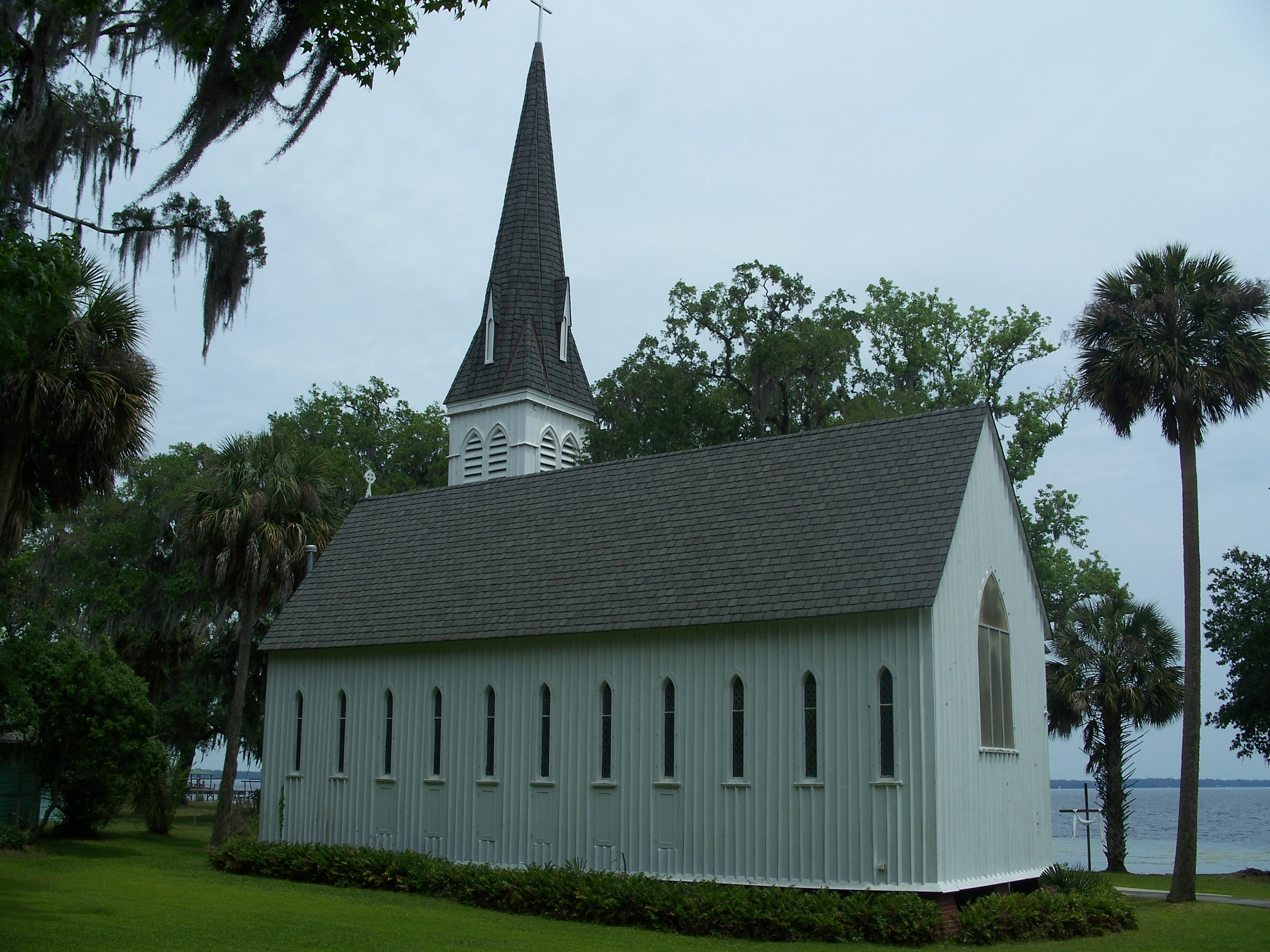
St. Mary's Church, Green Cove Springs, Florida

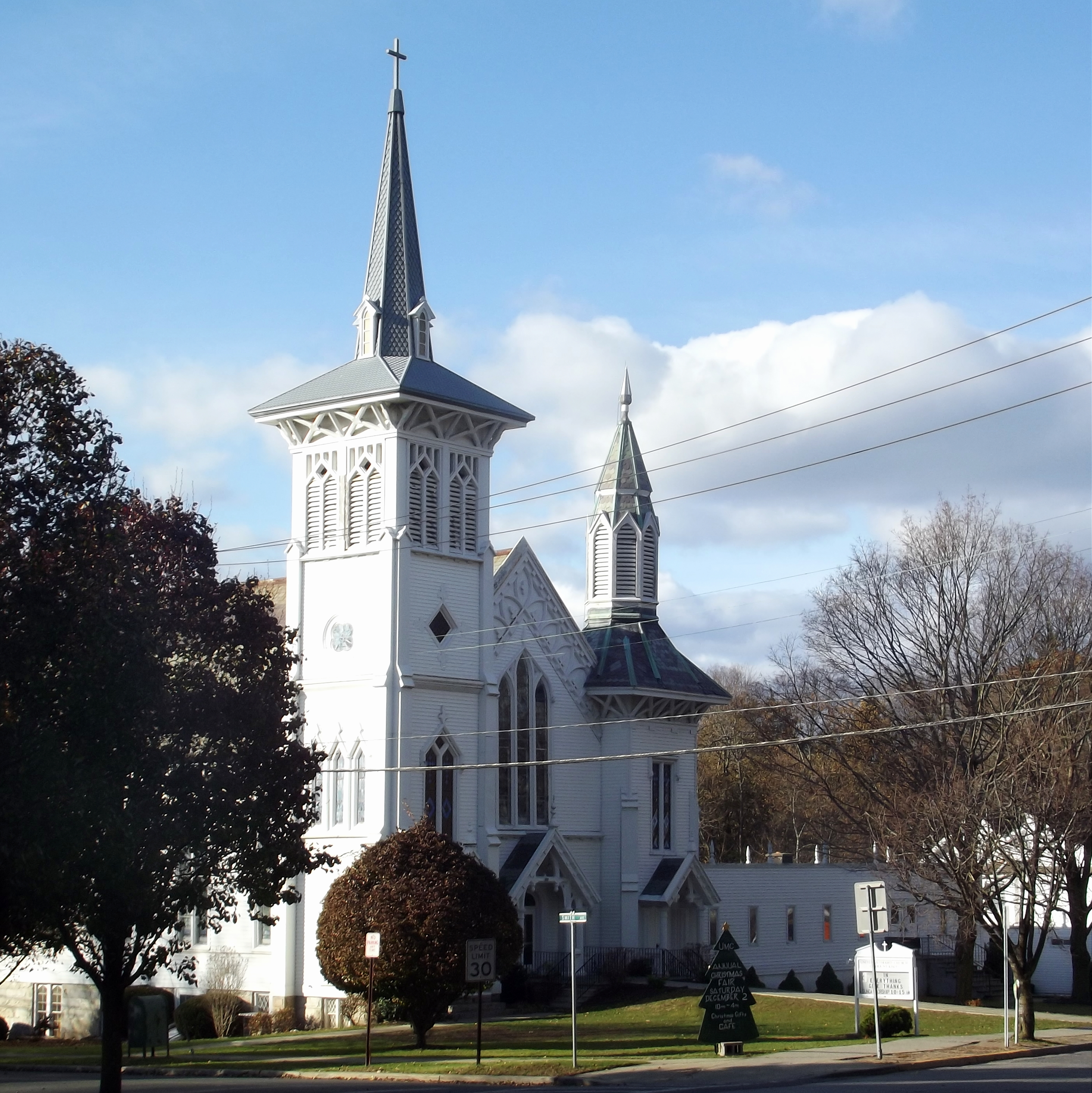
United Methodist Church and Parsonage, Mount Kisco, New York

=== Houses ===
==== Plain ====
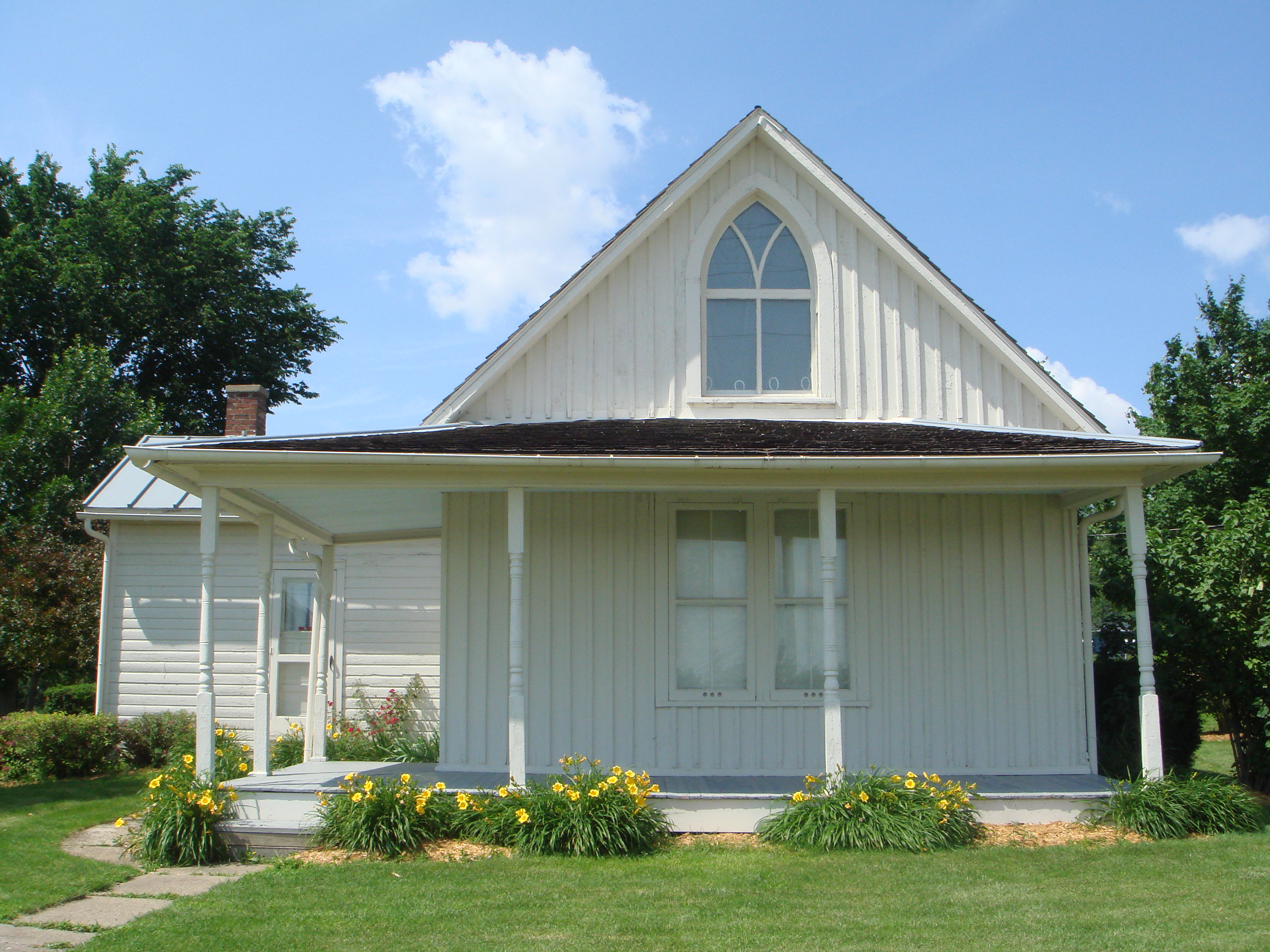
American Gothic House in Eldon, Iowa, used by Grant Wood in his famous painting.

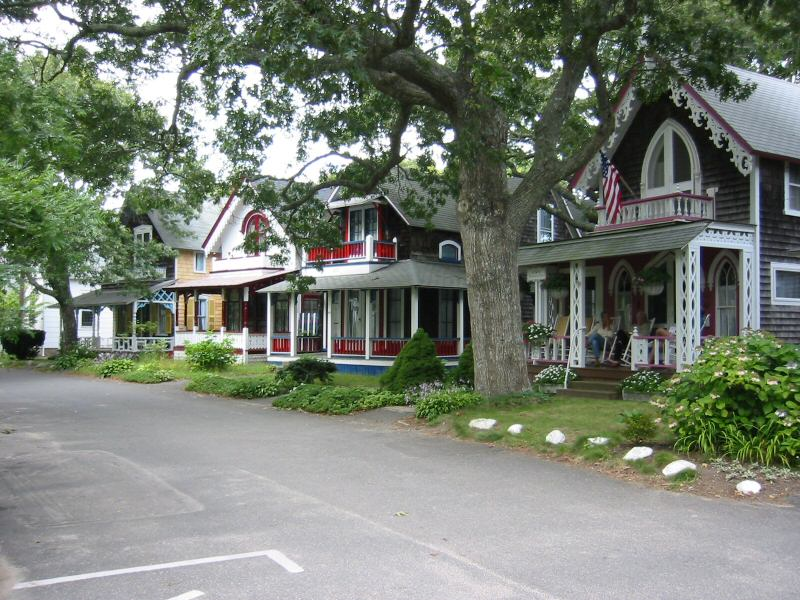
Cottages in a former Methodist camp town in Oak Bluffs, Massachusetts on Martha's Vineyard.

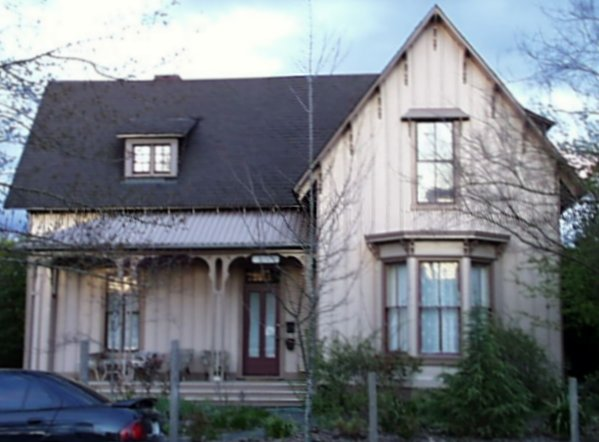
Peters-Liston-Wintermeier House in Eugene, Oregon

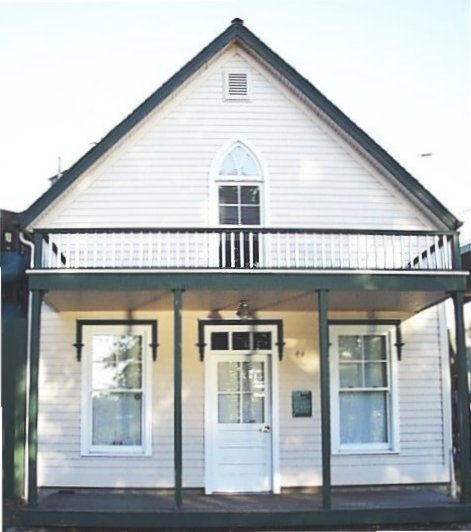
Wilson-Durbin House in Salem, Oregon

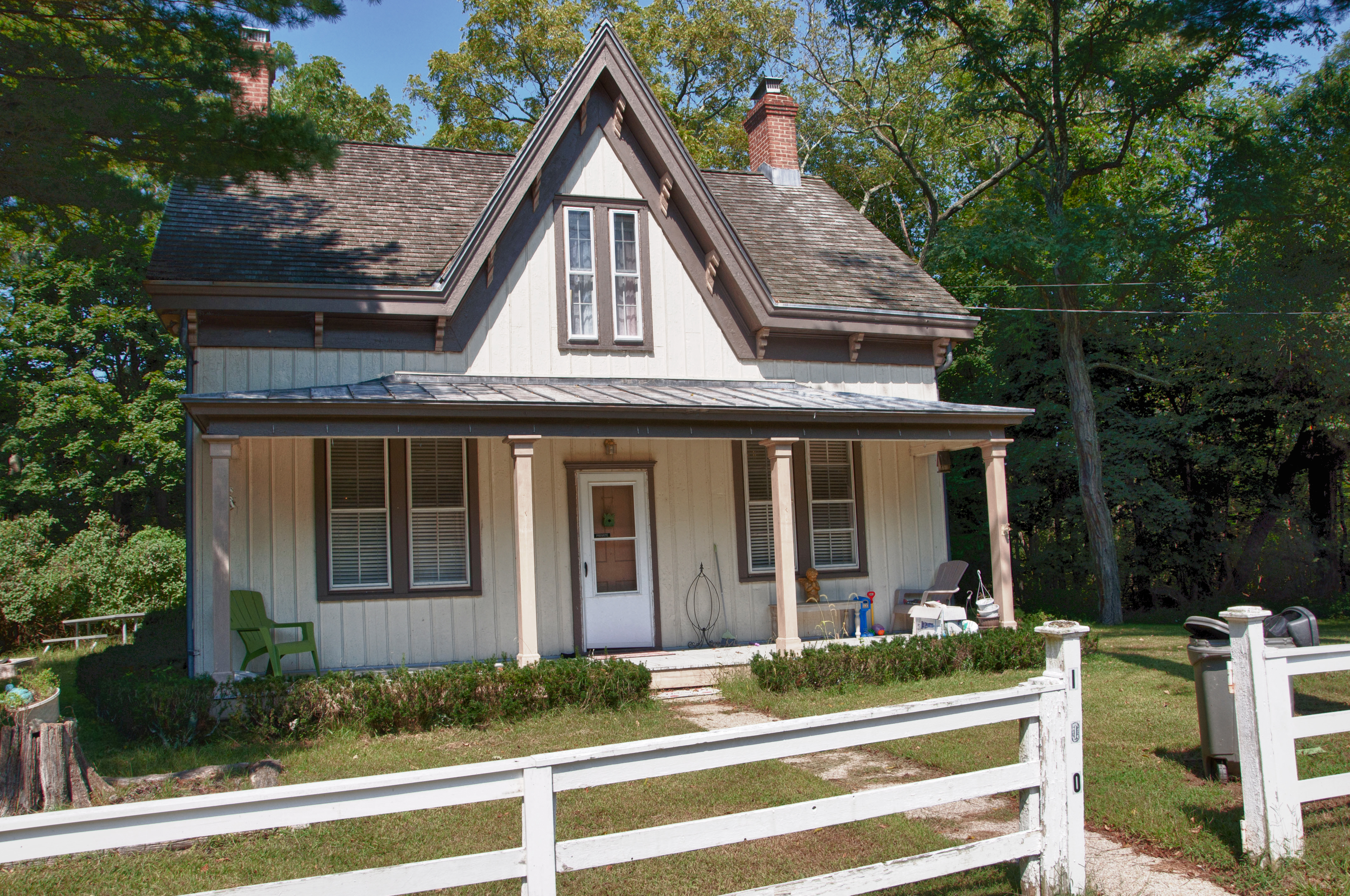
Blydenburgh Farmhouse Cottage, built 1860 in Smithtown, New York

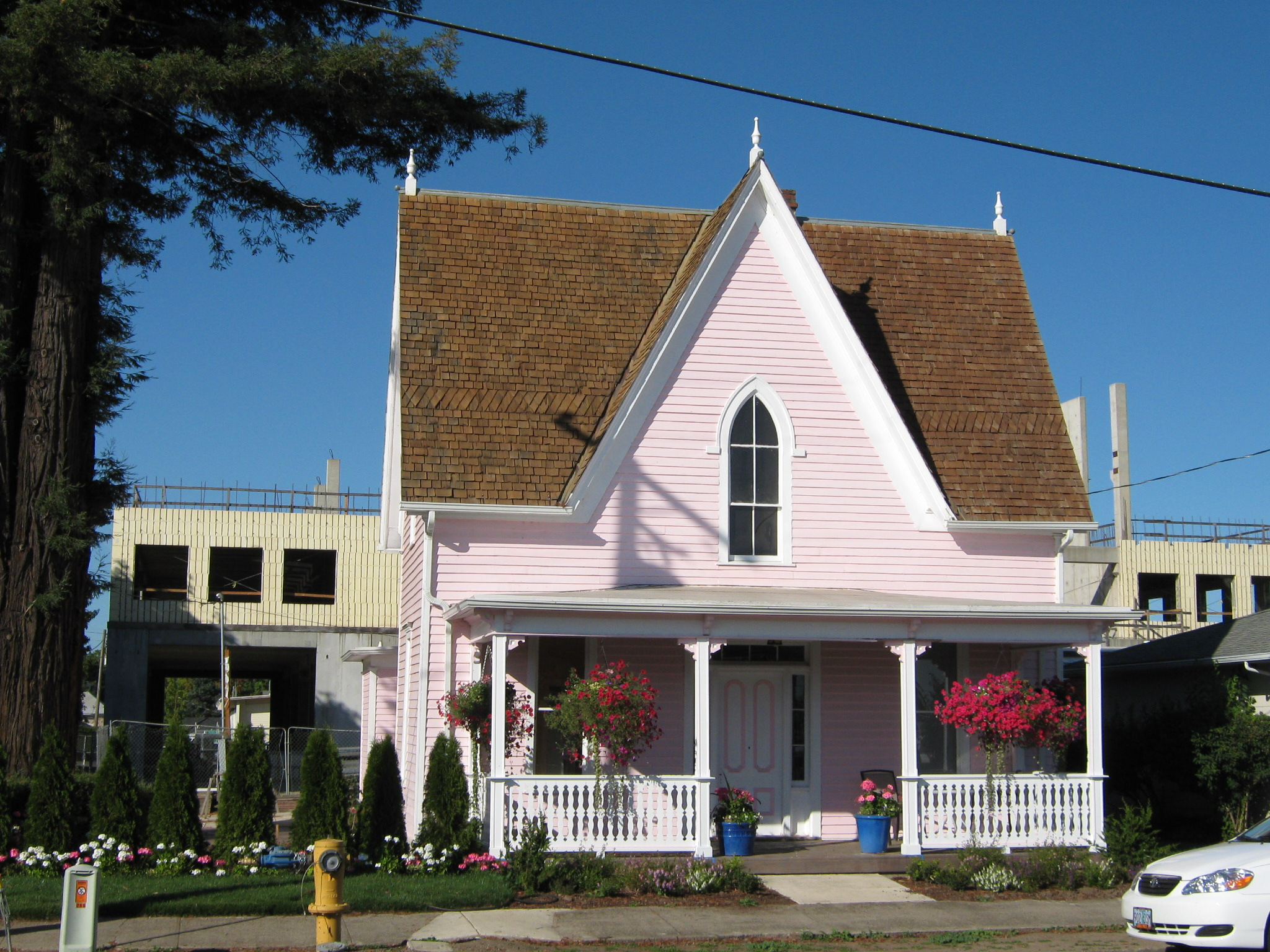
James S. and Jennie M. Cooper House, Independence, Oregon

==== Ornate ====
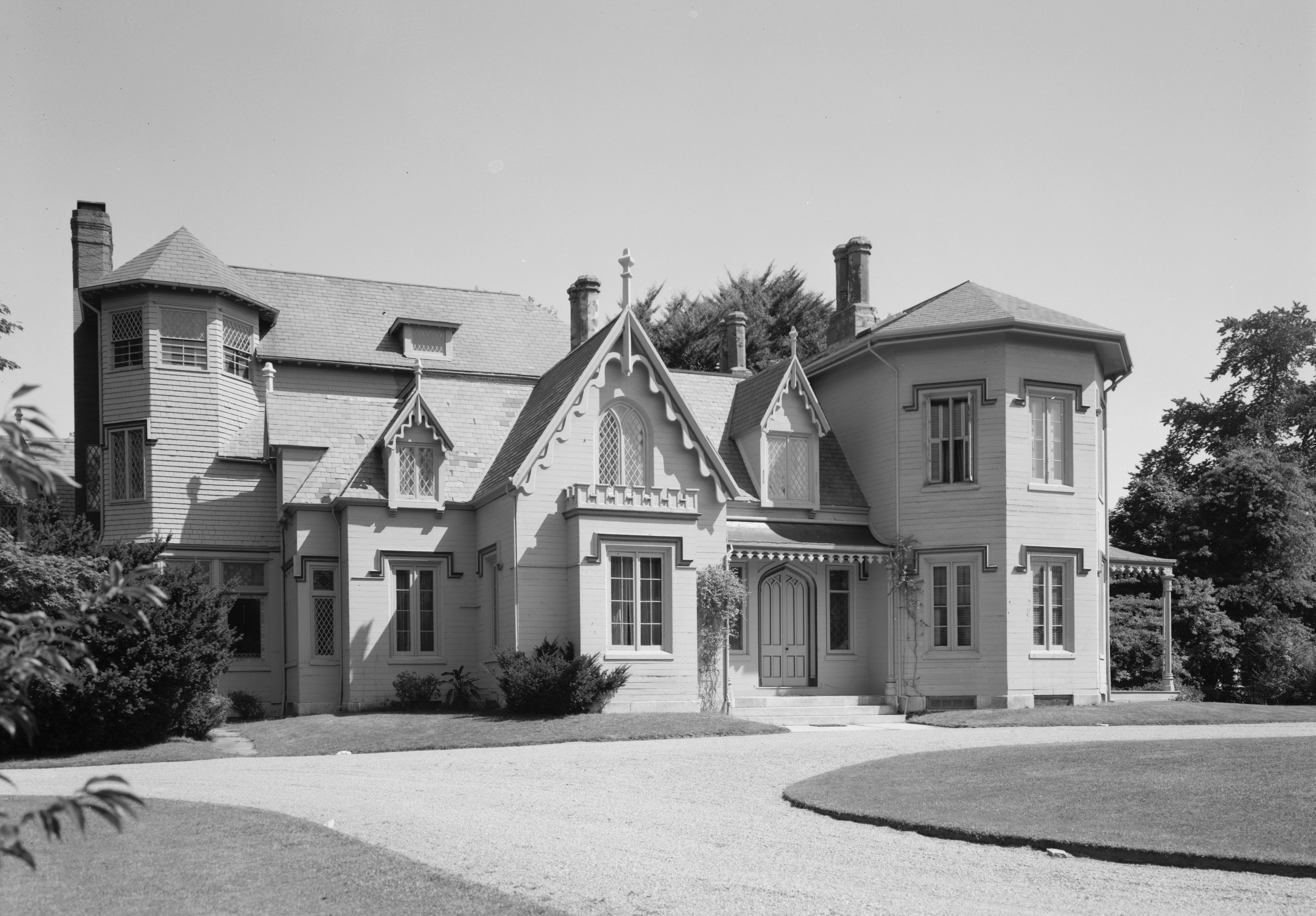
Kingscote in Newport, Rhode Island, built in 1839.

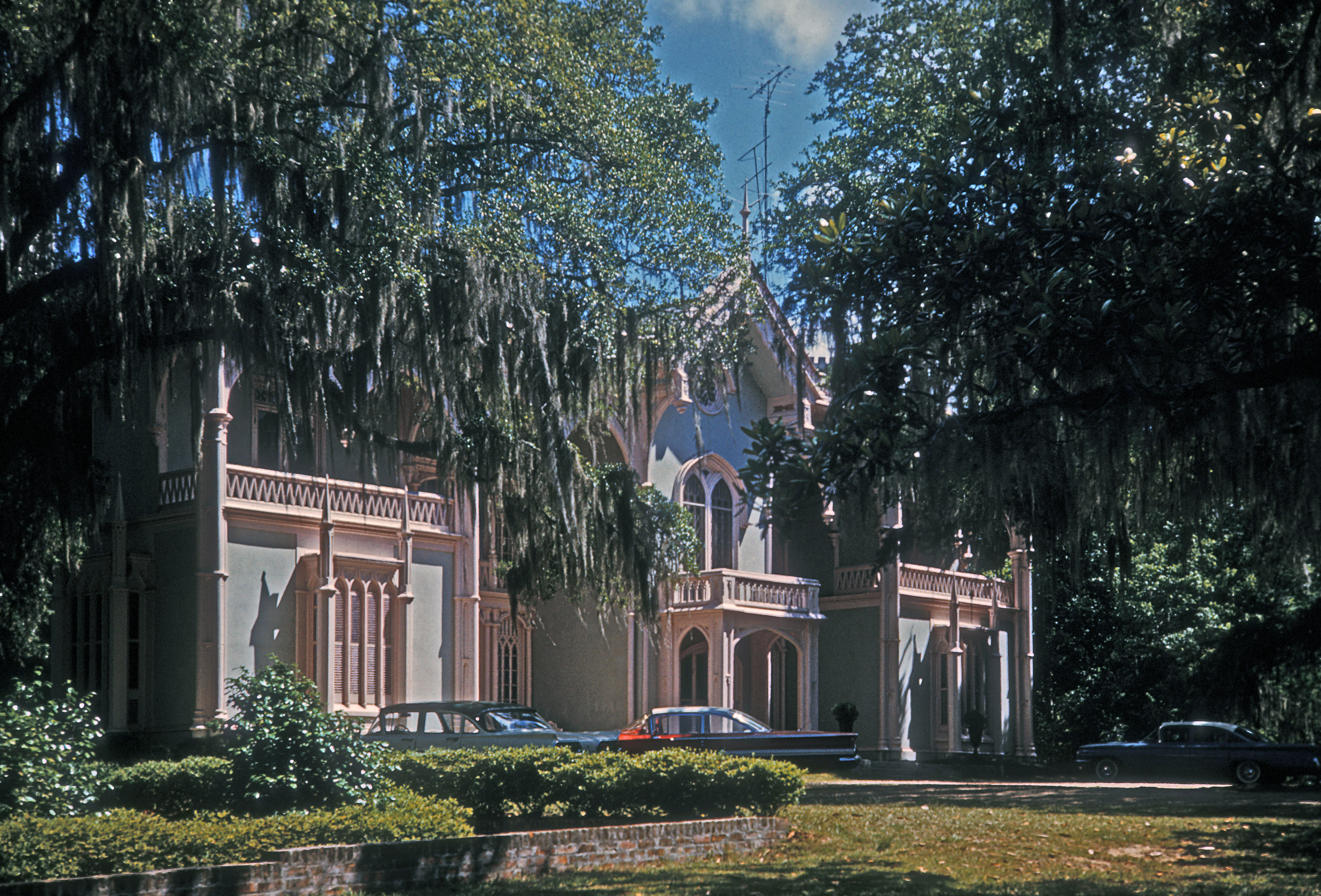
Afton Villa, a former plantation house in West Feliciana Parish, Louisiana. Built from 1848 to 1856, the masonry structure burned in 1963.

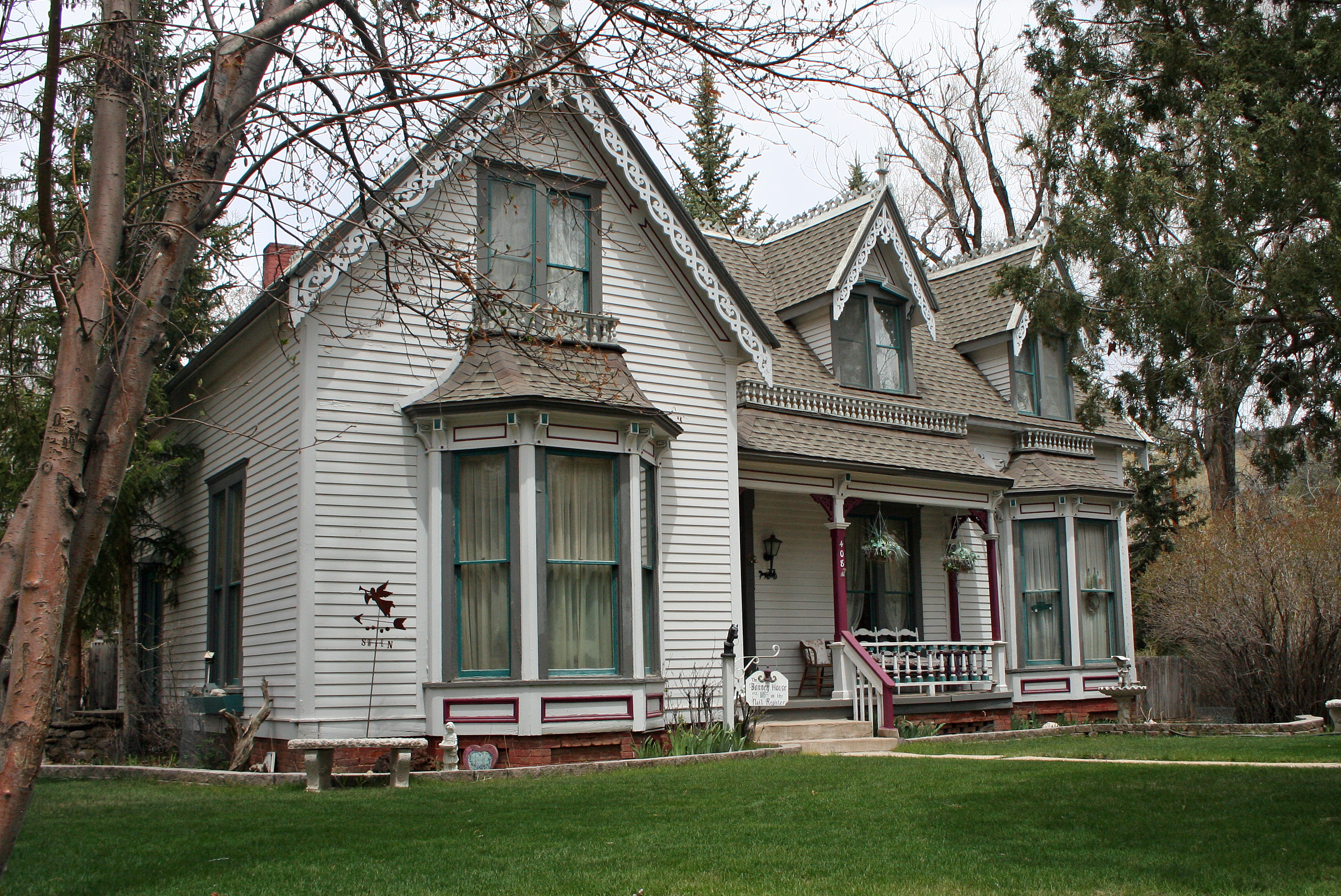
J. M. Bonney House in Buena Vista, Colorado, built in 1883

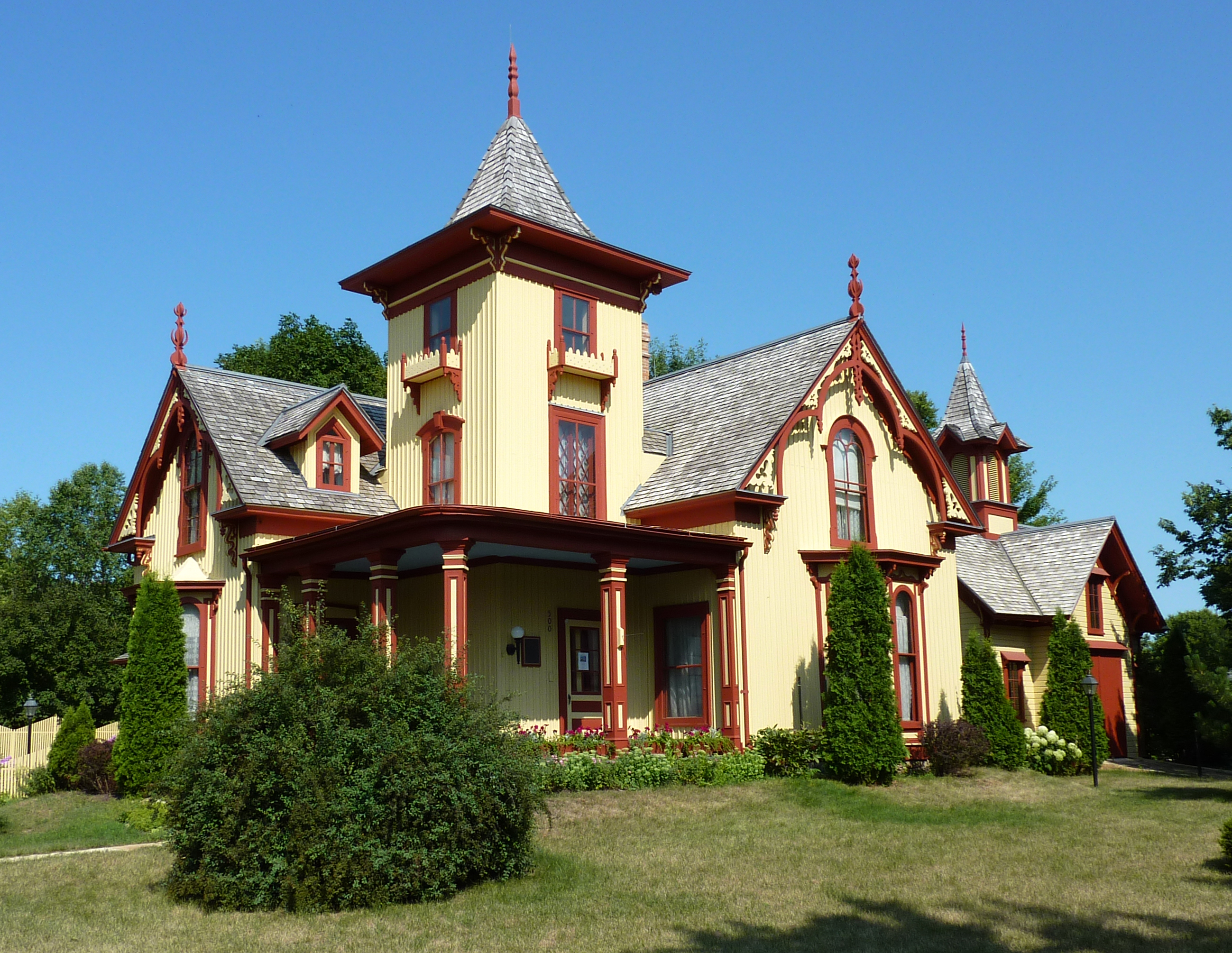
Eugene Saint Julien Cox House in St. Peter, Minnesota, built in 1871

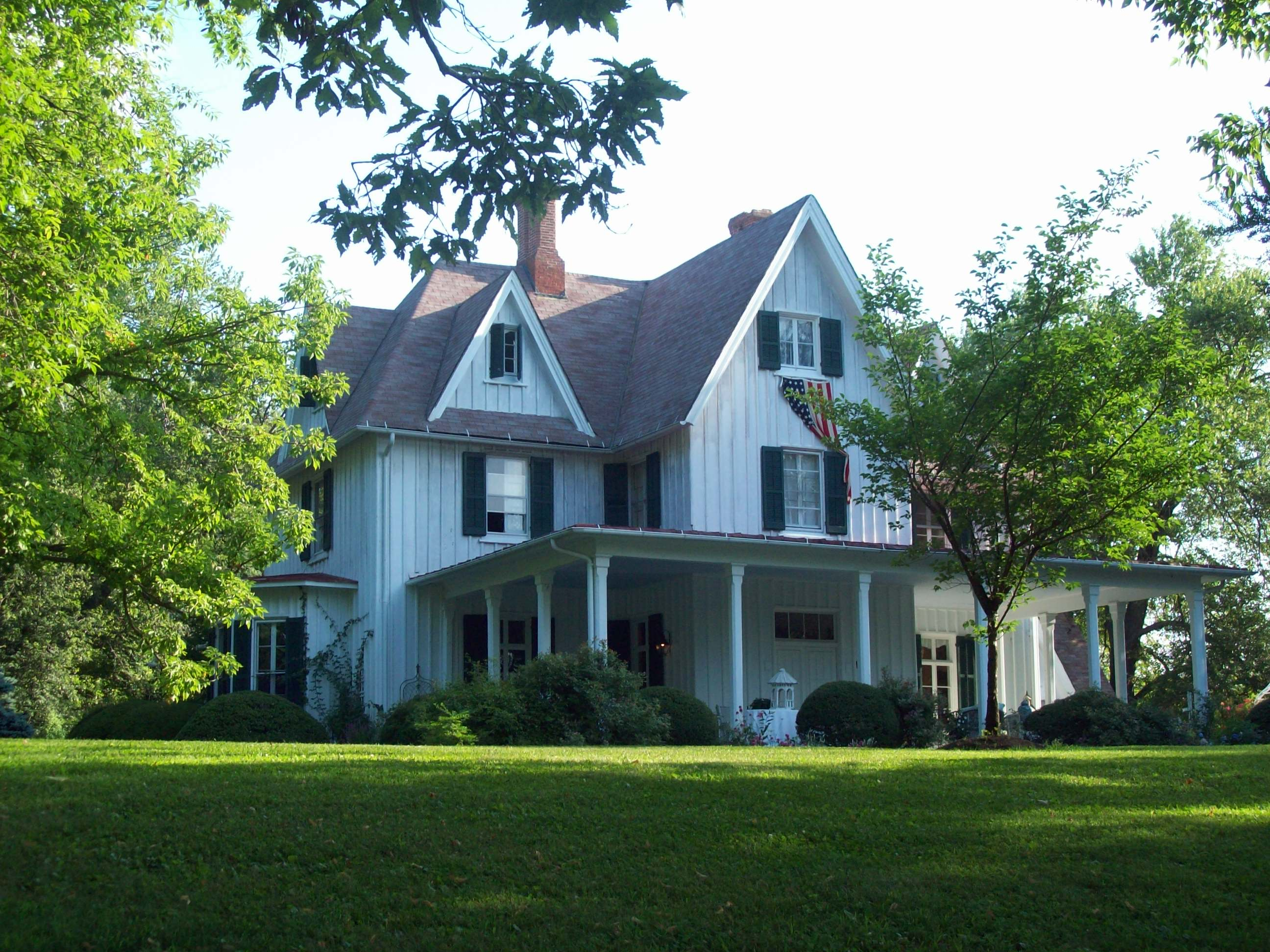
Indian Range, in Davidsonville, Maryland, built in 1852

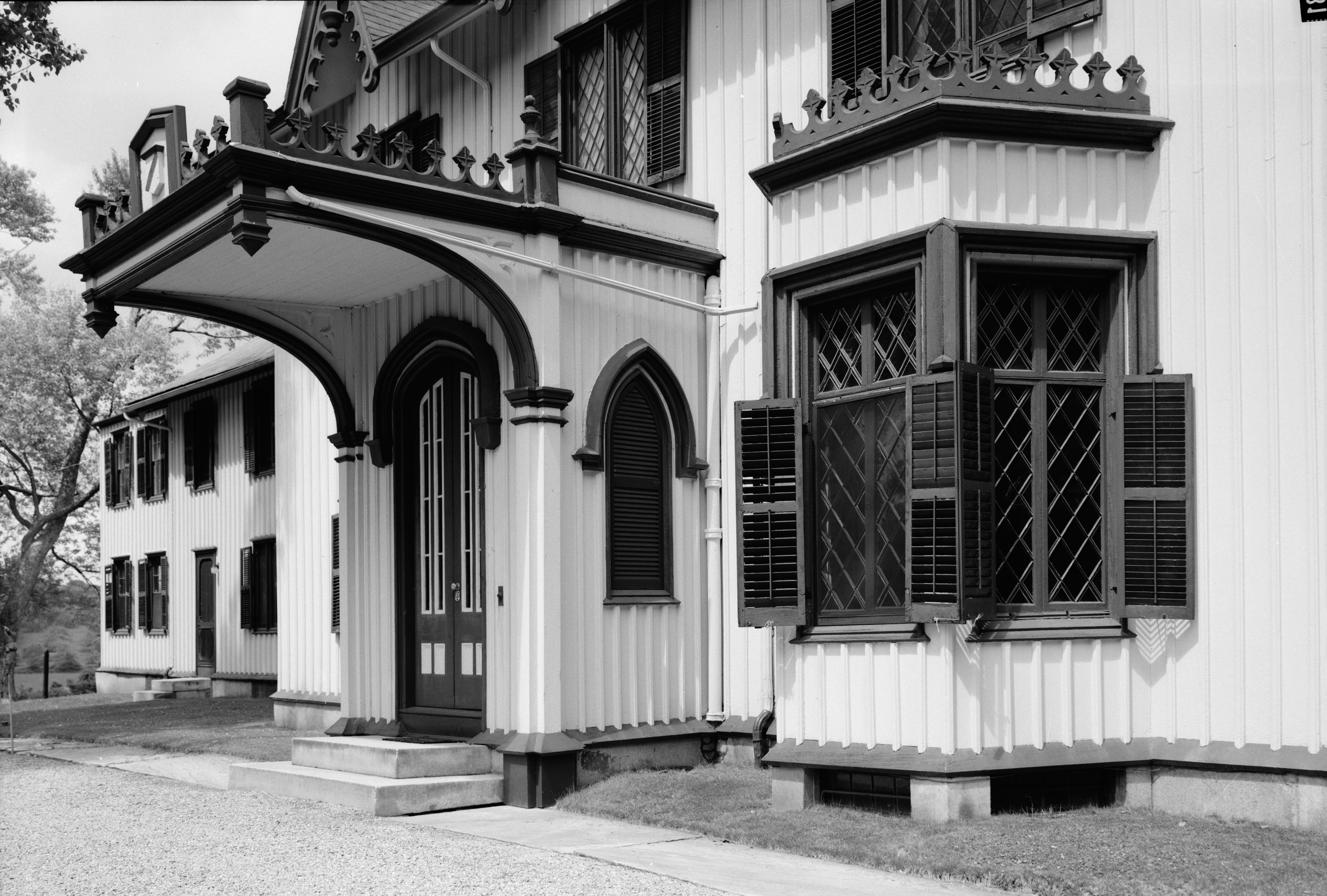
Roseland Cottage, Woodstock, Connecticut

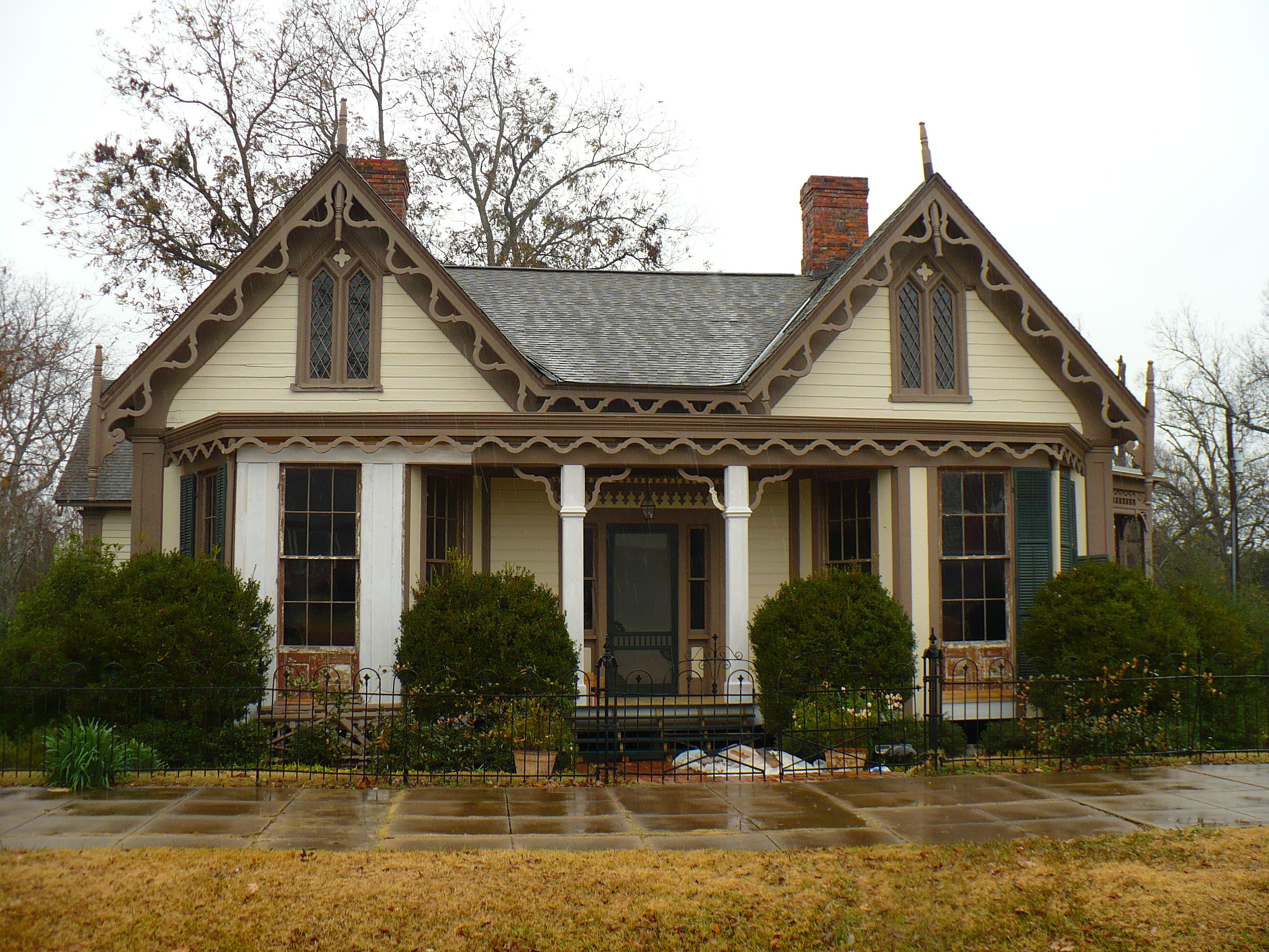
Ashe Cottage, Demopolis, Alabama

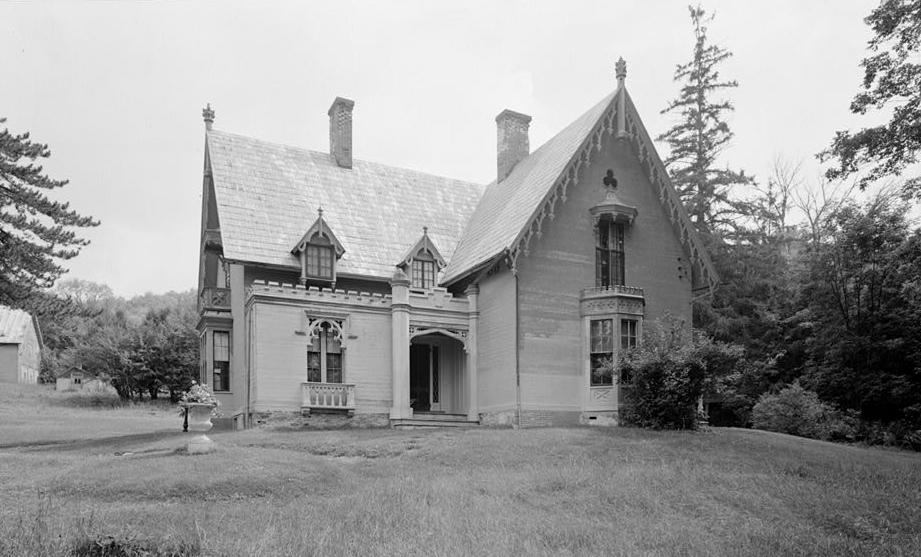
Justin Smith Morrill Homestead Strafford, Vermont

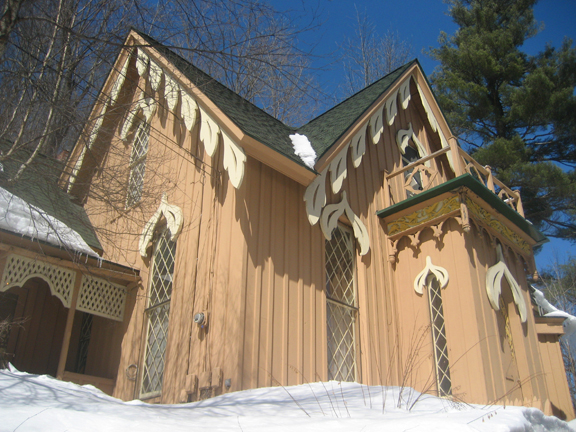
Athenwood, Montpelier, Vermont, built 1850

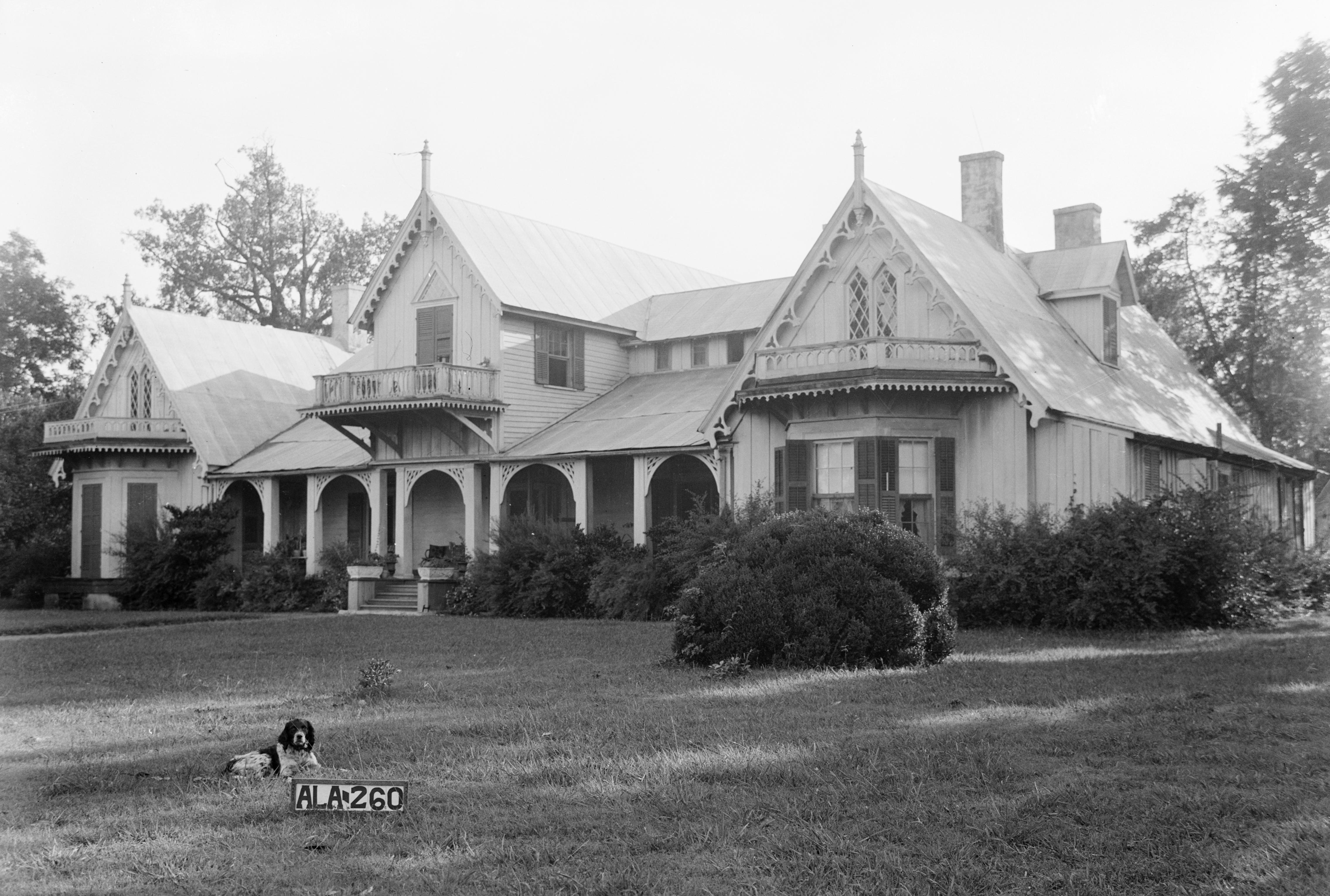
Waldwic, Gallion, Alabama

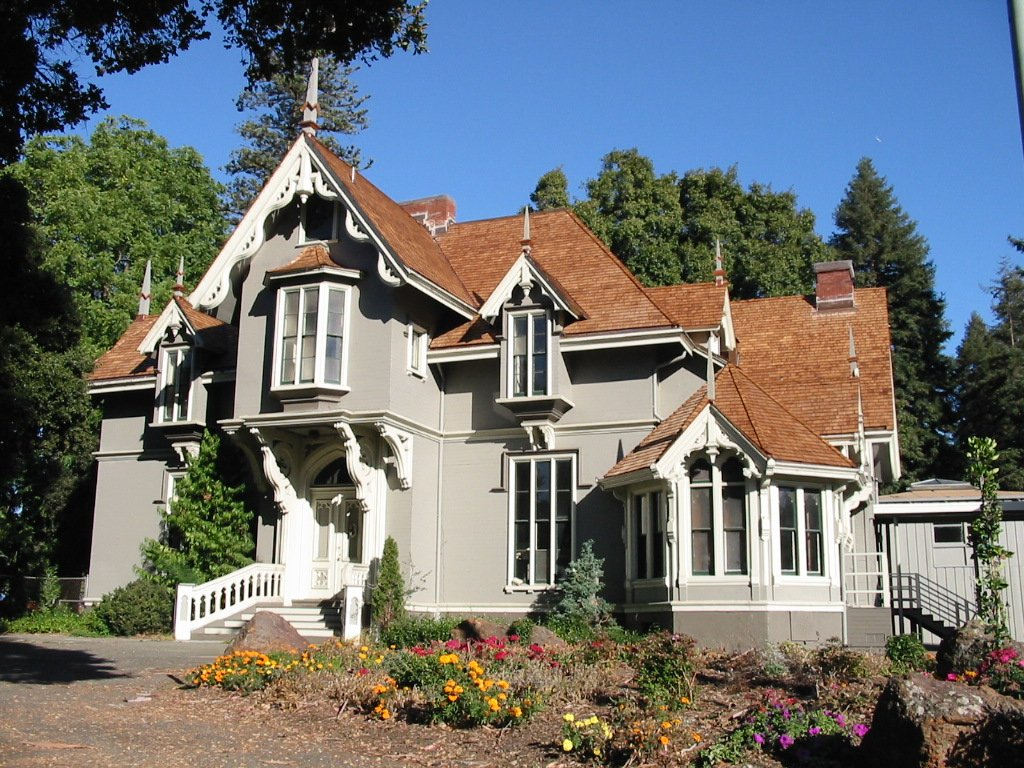
J. Mora Moss House in Mosswood Park, Oakland, California

=== Ornamental use ===
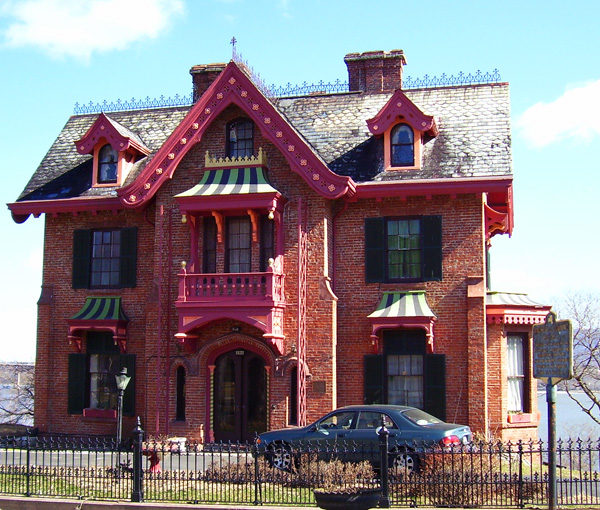
Warren House, Gothic Revival brick house with Carpenter Gothic trim and features, Newburgh, New York, Historic District

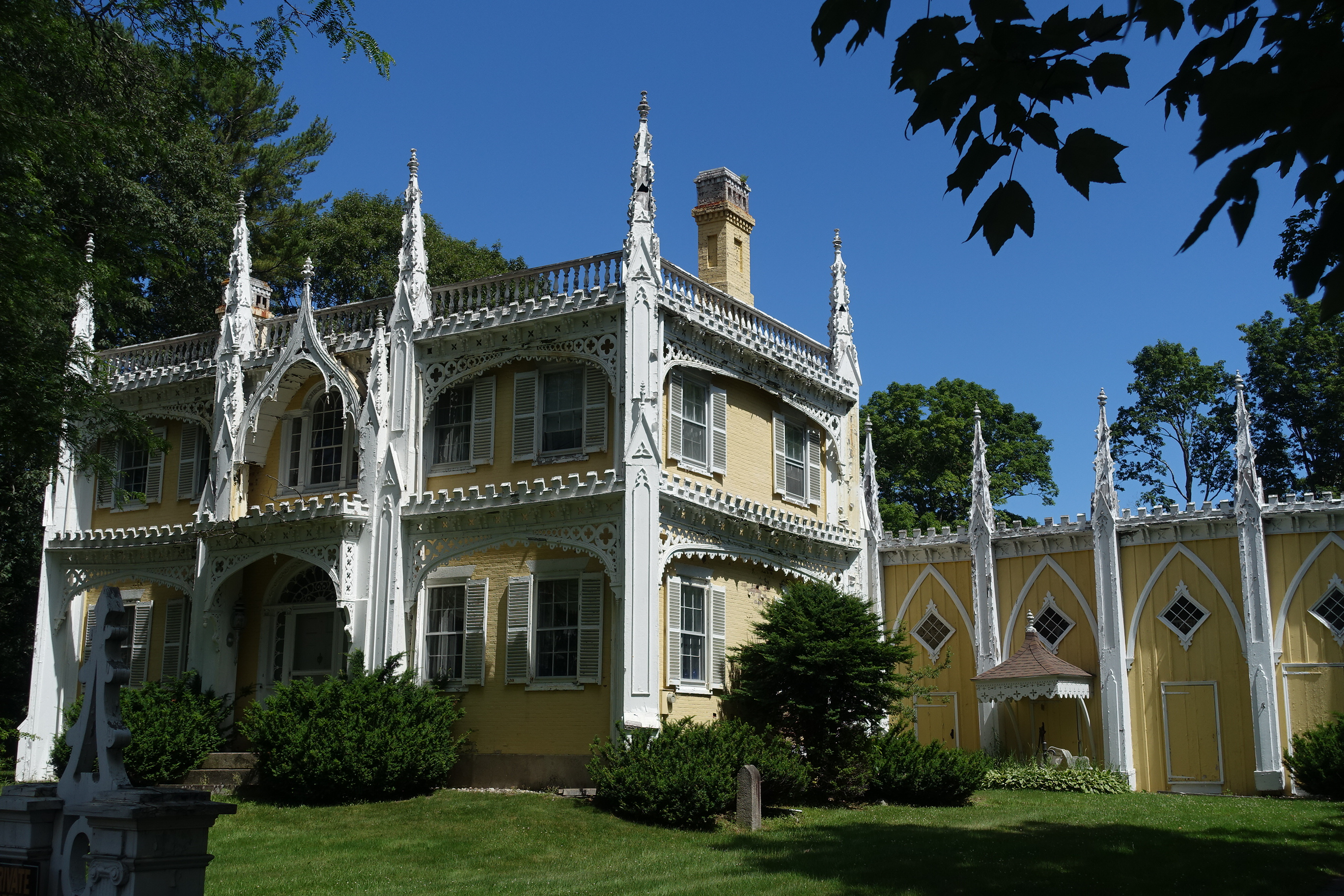
Wedding Cake House, Kennebunk, Maine. Example of a house built in an older style modified in the Carpenter Gothic style in the mid-1800s.

== See also ==
- American Gothic – 1930 painting by Grant Wood
- Andrew Jackson Downing – American landscape designer & horticulturalist (1815–1852)
- Gothic Revival – Architectural movement
- Gingerbread (architecture) – Victorian-era architectural element
- Rural Ontario Architecture
- Harmony School, School District No. 53 in rural Otoe County, Nebraska is an example of a Carpenter Gothic one-room schoolhouse.
- Springside – Historic house in New York, United States
- Stick style – Late-19th-century American architectural style
- Structure relocation – Process of moving a structure from one location to another
- United Hebrews of Ocala, a Carpenter Gothic synagogue
- Richard Upjohn – English-American architect (1802–1878)
- Wedding Cake House (Kennebunkport, Maine). Called the "most photographed building in Maine," it is an example of Carpenter Gothic remodeling of a frame building originally built in another style of architecture.
