= Alabama's congressional delegations =

Since Alabama became a U.S. state in 1819, it has sent congressional delegations to the United States Senate and United States House of Representatives. Each state elects two senators to serve for six years, and members of the House to two-year terms. Before becoming a state, the Alabama Territory elected a non-voting delegate at-large to Congress from 1818 to 1819.

These are tables of congressional delegations from Alabama to the United States Senate and the United States House of Representatives.

== Current delegation ==
Current U.S. senators from Alabama
Alabama CPVI (2025): R+15	Class II senator	Class III senator
Alabama CPVI (2025): R+15	Tommy Tuberville (Senior senator) (Auburn)	Katie Britt (Junior senator) (Montgomery)
Party	Republican	Republican
Incumbent since	January 3, 2021	January 3, 2023

Alabama's current congressional delegation in the 119th Congress consists of its two senators, both of whom are Republicans, and its seven representatives: 5 Republicans, 2 Democrats.

The current dean of the Alabama delegation is Representative Robert Aderholt, having served in the U.S. Congress since 1997.

Current U.S. representatives from Alabama
District	Member (Residence)	Party	Incumbent since	CPVI (2026)	District map
1st	Barry Moore (Enterprise)	Republican	January 3, 2025	R+17	
2nd	Shomari Figures (Mobile)	Democratic	January 3, 2025	R+7	
3rd	Mike Rogers (Weaver)	Republican	January 3, 2003	R+23	
4th	Robert Aderholt (Haleyville)	Republican	January 3, 1997	R+33	
5th	Dale Strong (Huntsville)	Republican	January 3, 2023	R+15	
6th	Gary Palmer (Hoover)	Republican	January 3, 2015	R+17	
7th	Terri Sewell (Birmingham)	Democratic	January 3, 2011	D+10	

== United States Senate ==
Class II senator	Congress	Class III senator
William R. King (DR)	16th (1819–1821)	John Williams Walker (DR)
William R. King (DR)	17th (1821–1823)	John Williams Walker (DR)
William R. King (DR)	17th (1821–1823)	William Kelly (DR)
William R. King (DR)	18th (1823–1825)	William Kelly (DR)
William R. King (J)	19th (1825–1827)	Henry H. Chambers (J)
William R. King (J)	19th (1825–1827)	Israel Pickens (J)
William R. King (J)	19th (1825–1827)	John McKinley (J)
William R. King (J)	20th (1827–1829)	John McKinley (J)
William R. King (J)	21st (1829–1831)	John McKinley (J)
William R. King (J)	22nd (1831–1833)	Gabriel Moore (J)
William R. King (J)	23rd (1833–1835)	Gabriel Moore (NR)
William R. King (J)	24th (1835–1837)	Gabriel Moore (NR)
William R. King (D)	25th (1837–1839)	John McKinley (D)
William R. King (D)	25th (1837–1839)	Clement Comer Clay (D)
William R. King (D)	26th (1839–1841)	Clement Comer Clay (D)
William R. King (D)	27th (1841–1843)	Clement Comer Clay (D)
William R. King (D)	27th (1841–1843)	Arthur P. Bagby (D)
William R. King (D)	28th (1843–1845)	Arthur P. Bagby (D)
Dixon H. Lewis (D)	28th (1843–1845)	Arthur P. Bagby (D)
Dixon H. Lewis (D)	29th (1845–1847)	Arthur P. Bagby (D)
Dixon H. Lewis (D)	30th (1847–1849)	Arthur P. Bagby (D)
Benjamin Fitzpatrick (D)	30th (1847–1849)	William R. King (D)
Benjamin Fitzpatrick (D)	31st (1849–1851)	William R. King (D)
Jeremiah Clemens (D)	31st (1849–1851)	William R. King (D)
Jeremiah Clemens (D)	32nd (1851–1853)	William R. King (D)
Jeremiah Clemens (D)	32nd (1851–1853)	Benjamin Fitzpatrick (D)
vacant (Note: Seat was vacant due to failure of legislature to elect a senator by the beginning of the congress.)	33rd (1853–1855)	Benjamin Fitzpatrick (D)
C. C. Clay Jr. (D)	33rd (1853–1855)	Benjamin Fitzpatrick (D)
C. C. Clay Jr. (D)	34th (1855–1857)	vacant
C. C. Clay Jr. (D)	34th (1855–1857)	Benjamin Fitzpatrick (D)
C. C. Clay Jr. (D)	35th (1857–1859)	Benjamin Fitzpatrick (D)
C. C. Clay Jr. (D)	36th (1859–1861)	Benjamin Fitzpatrick (D)
vacant (Note: George S. Houston presented credentials as a senator-elect on February 9, 1866, but was not permitted to take his seat, Alabama having not been re-admitted to the Union.)	36th (1859–1861)	vacant
vacant	37th (1861–1863)	vacant
vacant	38th (1863–1865)	vacant
vacant	39th (1865–1867)	vacant
vacant	40th (1867–1869)	vacant
Willard Warner (R)	40th (1867–1869)	George E. Spencer (R)
Willard Warner (R)	41st (1869–1871)	George E. Spencer (R)
George Goldthwaite (D)	42nd (1871–1873)	George E. Spencer (R)
George Goldthwaite (D)	43rd (1873–1875)	George E. Spencer (R)
George Goldthwaite (D)	44th (1875–1877)	George E. Spencer (R)
John T. Morgan (D)	45th (1877–1879)	George E. Spencer (R)
John T. Morgan (D)	46th (1879–1881)	George S. Houston (D)
John T. Morgan (D)	46th (1879–1881)	Luke Pryor (D)
John T. Morgan (D)	46th (1879–1881)	James L. Pugh (D)
John T. Morgan (D)	47th (1881–1883)	James L. Pugh (D)
John T. Morgan (D)	48th (1883–1885)	James L. Pugh (D)
John T. Morgan (D)	49th (1885–1887)	James L. Pugh (D)
John T. Morgan (D)	50th (1887–1889)	James L. Pugh (D)
John T. Morgan (D)	51st (1889–1891)	James L. Pugh (D)
John T. Morgan (D)	52nd (1891–1893)	James L. Pugh (D)
John T. Morgan (D)	53rd (1893–1895)	James L. Pugh (D)
John T. Morgan (D)	54th (1895–1897)	James L. Pugh (D)
John T. Morgan (D)	55th (1897–1899)	Edmund Pettus (D)
John T. Morgan (D)	56th (1899–1901)	Edmund Pettus (D)
John T. Morgan (D)	57th (1901–1903)	Edmund Pettus (D)
John T. Morgan (D)	58th (1903–1905)	Edmund Pettus (D)
John T. Morgan (D)	59th (1905–1907)	Edmund Pettus (D)
John T. Morgan (D)	60th (1907–1909)	Edmund Pettus (D)
John H. Bankhead (D)	60th (1907–1909)	Joseph F. Johnston (D)
John H. Bankhead (D)	61st (1909–1911)	Joseph F. Johnston (D)
John H. Bankhead (D)	62nd (1911–1913)	Joseph F. Johnston (D)
John H. Bankhead (D)	63rd (1913–1915)	vacant (Note: The seat was vacant from August 8, 1913, to May 11, 1914. Henry D. Clayton was appointed to the U.S. Senate to fill the vacancy caused by the death of Joseph F. Johnston in 1913, but his appointment was challenged and withdrawn. Franklin Potts Glass Sr. was also appointed to the seat, but the U.S. Senate voted not to seat him.)
John H. Bankhead (D)	63rd (1913–1915)	Frank White (D)
John H. Bankhead (D)	64th (1915–1917)	Oscar Underwood (D)
John H. Bankhead (D)	65th (1917–1919)	Oscar Underwood (D)
John H. Bankhead (D)	66th (1919–1921)	Oscar Underwood (D)
B. B. Comer (D)	66th (1919–1921)	Oscar Underwood (D)
J. Thomas Heflin (D)	66th (1919–1921)	Oscar Underwood (D)
J. Thomas Heflin (D)	67th (1921–1923)	Oscar Underwood (D)
J. Thomas Heflin (D)	68th (1923–1925)	Oscar Underwood (D)
J. Thomas Heflin (D)	69th (1925–1927)	Oscar Underwood (D)
J. Thomas Heflin (D)	70th (1927–1929)	Hugo Black (D)
J. Thomas Heflin (D)	71st (1929–1931)	Hugo Black (D)
John H. Bankhead II (D)	72nd (1931–1933)	Hugo Black (D)
John H. Bankhead II (D)	73rd (1933–1935)	Hugo Black (D)
John H. Bankhead II (D)	74th (1935–1937)	Hugo Black (D)
John H. Bankhead II (D)	75th (1937–1939)	Hugo Black (D)
John H. Bankhead II (D)	75th (1937–1939)	Dixie Bibb Graves (D)
John H. Bankhead II (D)	75th (1937–1939)	J. Lister Hill (D)
John H. Bankhead II (D)	76th (1939–1941)	J. Lister Hill (D)
John H. Bankhead II (D)	77th (1941–1943)	J. Lister Hill (D)
John H. Bankhead II (D)	78th (1943–1945)	J. Lister Hill (D)
John H. Bankhead II (D)	79th (1945–1947)	J. Lister Hill (D)
George R. Swift (D)	79th (1945–1947)	J. Lister Hill (D)
John Sparkman (D)	79th (1945–1947)	J. Lister Hill (D)
John Sparkman (D)	80th (1947–1949)	J. Lister Hill (D)
John Sparkman (D)	81st (1949–1951)	J. Lister Hill (D)
John Sparkman (D)	82nd (1951–1953)	J. Lister Hill (D)
John Sparkman (D)	83rd (1953–1955)	J. Lister Hill (D)
John Sparkman (D)	84th (1955–1957)	J. Lister Hill (D)
John Sparkman (D)	85th (1957–1959)	J. Lister Hill (D)
John Sparkman (D)	86th (1959–1961)	J. Lister Hill (D)
John Sparkman (D)	87th (1961–1963)	J. Lister Hill (D)
John Sparkman (D)	88th (1963–1965)	J. Lister Hill (D)
John Sparkman (D)	89th (1965–1967)	J. Lister Hill (D)
John Sparkman (D)	90th (1967–1969)	J. Lister Hill (D)
John Sparkman (D)	91st (1969–1971)	James Allen (D)
John Sparkman (D)	92nd (1971–1973)	James Allen (D)
John Sparkman (D)	93rd (1973–1975)	James Allen (D)
John Sparkman (D)	94th (1975–1977)	James Allen (D)
John Sparkman (D)	95th (1977–1979)	James Allen (D)
John Sparkman (D)	95th (1977–1979)	Maryon Pittman Allen (D)
John Sparkman (D)	95th (1977–1979)	Donald Stewart (D)
Howell Heflin (D)	96th (1979–1981)	Donald Stewart (D)
Howell Heflin (D)	96th (1979–1981)	Jeremiah Denton (R)
Howell Heflin (D)	97th (1981–1983)	Jeremiah Denton (R)
Howell Heflin (D)	98th (1983–1985)	Jeremiah Denton (R)
Howell Heflin (D)	99th (1985–1987)	Jeremiah Denton (R)
Howell Heflin (D)	100th (1987–1989)	Richard Shelby (D)
Howell Heflin (D)	101st (1989–1991)	Richard Shelby (D)
Howell Heflin (D)	102nd (1991–1993)	Richard Shelby (D)
Howell Heflin (D)	103rd (1993–1995)	Richard Shelby (D)
Howell Heflin (D)	103rd (1993–1995)	Richard Shelby (R)
Howell Heflin (D)	104th (1995–1997)	Richard Shelby (R)
Jeff Sessions (R)	105th (1997–1999)	Richard Shelby (R)
Jeff Sessions (R)	106th (1999–2001)	Richard Shelby (R)
Jeff Sessions (R)	107th (2001–2003)	Richard Shelby (R)
Jeff Sessions (R)	108th (2003–2005)	Richard Shelby (R)
Jeff Sessions (R)	109th (2005–2007)	Richard Shelby (R)
Jeff Sessions (R)	110th (2007–2009)	Richard Shelby (R)
Jeff Sessions (R)	111th (2009–2011)	Richard Shelby (R)
Jeff Sessions (R)	112th (2011–2013)	Richard Shelby (R)
Jeff Sessions (R)	113th (2013–2015)	Richard Shelby (R)
Jeff Sessions (R)	114th (2015–2017)	Richard Shelby (R)
Jeff Sessions (R)	115th (2017–2019)	Richard Shelby (R)
Luther Strange (R)	115th (2017–2019)	Richard Shelby (R)
Doug Jones (D)	115th (2017–2019)	Richard Shelby (R)
Doug Jones (D)	116th (2019–2021)	Richard Shelby (R)
Tommy Tuberville (R)	117th (2021–2023)	Richard Shelby (R)
Tommy Tuberville (R)	118th (2023–2025)	Katie Britt (R)
Tommy Tuberville (R)	119th (2025–2027)	Katie Britt (R)
Barry Moore (R)	120th (2027–2029)	Katie Britt (R)

== United States House of Representatives ==
=== 1818–1819: 1 non-voting delegate ===
Starting on January 29, 1818, Alabama Territory sent a non-voting delegate to the House.

Congress	Delegate from Territory's at-large district
15th (1817–1819)	John Crowell (DR)
16th (March 4, 1819– December 14, 1819)	vacant

=== 1819–1823: 1 seat ===
After statehood on December 14, 1819, Alabama had one seat in the House.

Congress	At-large district
16th (1819–1821)	John Crowell (DR)
17th (1821–1823)	Gabriel Moore (DR)

=== 1823–1833: 3 seats ===
Following the 1820 census, Alabama had three seats.

Congress	1st district	2nd district	3rd district
18th (1823–1825)	Gabriel Moore (DR) (Note: Supported the Jackson faction in the 1824 United States presidential election)	John McKee (DR)	George W. Owen (DR)
19th (1825–1827)	Gabriel Moore (J)	John McKee (J)	George W. Owen (J)
20th (1827–1829)	Gabriel Moore (J)	John McKee (J)	George W. Owen (J)
21st (1829–1831)	Clement Comer Clay (J)	R. E. B. Baylor (J)	Dixon H. Lewis (J)
22nd (1831–1833)	Clement Comer Clay (J)	Samuel W. Mardis (J)	Dixon H. Lewis (J)

=== 1833–1843: 5 seats ===
Following the 1830 census, Alabama had five seats. During the 27th Congress, those seats were all elected statewide at-large on a general ticket.

Congress	1st district	2nd district	3rd district	4th district	5th district
23rd (1833–1835)	Clement Comer Clay (J)	John McKinley (J)	Samuel W. Mardis (J)	Dixon H. Lewis (N)	John Murphy (J)
24th (1835–1837)	Reuben Chapman (J)	Joshua L. Martin (J)	Joab Lawler (J)	Dixon H. Lewis (N)	Francis S. Lyon (NR)
25th (1837–1839)	Reuben Chapman (D)	Joshua L. Martin (D)	Joab Lawler (W)	Dixon H. Lewis (D)	Francis S. Lyon (W)
25th (1837–1839)	Reuben Chapman (D)	Joshua L. Martin (D)	George W. Crabb (W)	Dixon H. Lewis (D)	Francis S. Lyon (W)
26th (1839–1841)	Reuben Chapman (D)	David Hubbard (D)	George W. Crabb (W)	Dixon H. Lewis (D)	James Dellet (W)
27th (1841–1843)	5 seats elected on a general ticket from Alabama's at-large district				
27th (1841–1843)	1st seat	2nd seat	3rd seat	4th seat	5th seat
27th (1841–1843)	Reuben Chapman (D)	George S. Houston (D)	William Winter; Payne (D)	Dixon H. Lewis (D)	Benjamin G. Shields (D)

=== 1843–1863: 7 seats ===
Following the 1840 census, Alabama resumed the use of districts, now increased to seven.

Congress	1st district	2nd district	3rd district	4th district	5th district	6th district	7th district
28th (1843–1845)	James Dellet (W)	James E. Belser (D)	Dixon H. Lewis (D)	William Winter Payne (D)	George S. Houston (D)	Reuben Chapman (D)	Felix G. McConnell (D)
28th (1843–1845)	James Dellet (W)	James E. Belser (D)	William L. Yancey (D)	William Winter Payne (D)	George S. Houston (D)	Reuben Chapman (D)	Felix G. McConnell (D)
29th (1845–1847)	Edmund S. Dargan (D)	Henry W. Hilliard (W)	William L. Yancey (D)	William Winter Payne (D)	George S. Houston (D)	Reuben Chapman (D)	Felix G. McConnell (D)
29th (1845–1847)	Edmund S. Dargan (D)	Henry W. Hilliard (W)	James L. F. Cottrell (D)	William Winter Payne (D)	George S. Houston (D)	Reuben Chapman (D)	Franklin W. Bowdon (D)
30th (1847–1849)	John Gayle (W)	Henry W. Hilliard (W)	Sampson Willis; Harris (D)	Samuel Williams Inge (D)	George S. Houston (D)	Williamson R. W. Cobb (D)	Franklin W. Bowdon (D)
31st (1849–1851)	William J. Alston (W)	Henry W. Hilliard (W)	Sampson Willis; Harris (D)	Samuel Williams Inge (D)	David Hubbard (D)	Williamson R. W. Cobb (D)	Franklin W. Bowdon (D)
32nd (1851–1853)	John Bragg (D)	James Abercrombie (W)	Sampson Willis; Harris (D)	William Russell Smith (U)	George S. Houston (D)	Williamson R. W. Cobb (D)	Alexander White (W)
33rd (1853–1855)	Philip Phillips (D)	James Abercrombie (W)	Sampson Willis; Harris (D)	William Russell Smith (D)	George S. Houston (D)	Williamson R. W. Cobb (D)	James F. Dowdell (D)
34th (1855–1857)	Percy Walker (KN)	Eli S. Shorter (D)	James F. Dowdell (D)	William Russell Smith (KN)	George S. Houston (D)	Williamson R. W. Cobb (D)	Sampson Willis; Harris (D)
35th (1857–1859)	James A. Stallworth (D)	Eli S. Shorter (D)	James F. Dowdell (D)	Sydenham Moore (D)	George S. Houston (D)	Williamson R. W. Cobb (D)	Jabez L. M. Curry (D)
36th (1859–1861)	James A. Stallworth (D)	James L. Pugh (D)	David Clopton (D)	Sydenham Moore (D)	George S. Houston (D)	Williamson R. W. Cobb (D)	Jabez L. M. Curry (D)
36th (1859–1861)	Vacant during American Civil War						
37th (1861–1863)	Vacant during American Civil War						

=== 1863–1873: 6 seats ===
Following the 1860 census, Alabama was apportioned six seats.

Congress	1st district	2nd district	3rd district	4th district	5th district	6th district
38–39th (1863–1867)	Vacant during American Civil War					
40th (1867–1869)	Vacant during American Civil War					
40th (1867–1869)	Francis W. Kellogg (R)	C. W. Buckley (R)	Benjamin W. Norris (R)	Charles W. Pierce (R)	John B. Callis (R)	Thomas Haughey (R)
41st (1869–1871)	Alfred Eliab Buck (R)	C. W. Buckley (R)	Robert Stell Heflin (R)	Charles Hays (R)	Peter M. Dox (D)	William C. Sherrod (D)
42nd (1871–1873)	Benjamin S. Turner (R)	C. W. Buckley (R)	William A. Handley (D)	Charles Hays (R)	Peter M. Dox (D)	Joseph H. Sloss (D)

=== 1873–1893: 8 seats ===
Following the 1870 census, Alabama was apportioned eight seats. From 1873 to 1877, the two new seats were elected at large, statewide. After 1877, however, the entire delegation was redistricted.

Congress	District						At-large seats	
Congress	1st	2nd	3rd	4th	5th	6th	1st seat	2nd seat
43rd (1873–1875)	Frederick G. Bromberg (LR)	James T. Rapier (R)	Charles Pelham (R)	Charles Hays (R)	John Henry; Caldwell (D)	Joseph Humphrey; Sloss (D)	Charles Christopher; Sheats (R)	Alexander White (R)
44th (1875–1877)	Jeremiah Haralson (R)	Jeremiah Norman; Williams (D)	Taul Bradford (D)	Charles Hays (R)	John Henry; Caldwell (D)	Goldsmith W. Hewitt (D)	William H. Forney (D)	Burwell B. Lewis (D)
45th (1877–1879)	James T. Jones (D)	Hilary A. Herbert (D)	Jeremiah Norman; Williams (D)	Charles M. Shelley (D)	Robert F. Ligon (D)	Goldsmith W. Hewitt (D)	7th district	8th district
45th (1877–1879)	James T. Jones (D)	Hilary A. Herbert (D)	Jeremiah Norman; Williams (D)	Charles M. Shelley (D)	Robert F. Ligon (D)	Goldsmith W. Hewitt (D)	William H. Forney (D)	William W. Garth (D)
46th (1879–1881)	Thomas H. Herndon (D)	Hilary A. Herbert (D)	William J. Samford (D)	Charles M. Shelley (D)	Thomas Williams (D)	Burwell B. Lewis (D)	William H. Forney (D)	William M. Lowe (GB)
46th (1879–1881)	Thomas H. Herndon (D)	Hilary A. Herbert (D)	William J. Samford (D)	Charles M. Shelley (D)	Thomas Williams (D)	Newton N. Clements (D)	William H. Forney (D)	William M. Lowe (GB)
47th (1881–1883)	Thomas H. Herndon (D)	Hilary A. Herbert (D)	William C. Oates (D)	Charles M. Shelley (D)	Thomas Williams (D)	Goldsmith W. Hewitt (D)	William H. Forney (D)	Joseph Wheeler (D)
47th (1881–1883)	Thomas H. Herndon (D)	Hilary A. Herbert (D)	William C. Oates (D)	vacant (Note: Seat was contested by James Q. Smith and declared vacant; the original representative won back his own seat.)	Thomas Williams (D)	Goldsmith W. Hewitt (D)	William H. Forney (D)	William M. Lowe (GB) (Note: Successfully contested the election of the representative that was replaced.)
47th (1881–1883)	Thomas H. Herndon (D)	Hilary A. Herbert (D)	William C. Oates (D)	Charles M. Shelley (D)	Thomas Williams (D)	Goldsmith W. Hewitt (D)	William H. Forney (D)	Joseph Wheeler (D)
48th (1883–1885)	Thomas H. Herndon (D)	Hilary A. Herbert (D)	William C. Oates (D)	Charles M. Shelley (D)	Thomas Williams (D)	Goldsmith W. Hewitt (D)	William H. Forney (D)	Luke Pryor (D)
48th (1883–1885)	James T. Jones (D)	Hilary A. Herbert (D)	William C. Oates (D)	George H. Craig (R)	Thomas Williams (D)	Goldsmith W. Hewitt (D)	William H. Forney (D)	Luke Pryor (D)
49th (1885–1887)	James T. Jones (D)	Hilary A. Herbert (D)	William C. Oates (D)	Alexander C. Davidson (D)	Thomas William; Sadler (D)	John Mason Martin (D)	William H. Forney (D)	Joseph Wheeler (D)
50th (1887–1889)	James T. Jones (D)	Hilary A. Herbert (D)	William C. Oates (D)	Alexander C. Davidson (D)	James E. Cobb (D)	John H. Bankhead (D)	William H. Forney (D)	Joseph Wheeler (D)
51st (1889–1891)	Richard H. Clarke (D)	Hilary A. Herbert (D)	William C. Oates (D)	Louis W. Turpin (D)	James E. Cobb (D)	John H. Bankhead (D)	William H. Forney (D)	Joseph Wheeler (D)
51st (1889–1891)	Richard H. Clarke (D)	Hilary A. Herbert (D)	William C. Oates (D)	J. V. McDuffie (R)	James E. Cobb (D)	John H. Bankhead (D)	William H. Forney (D)	Joseph Wheeler (D)
52nd (1891–1893)	Richard H. Clarke (D)	Hilary A. Herbert (D)	William C. Oates (D)	Louis W. Turpin (D)	James E. Cobb (D)	John H. Bankhead (D)	William H. Forney (D)	Joseph Wheeler (D)

=== 1893–1913: 9 seats ===
Following the 1890 census, Alabama was apportioned nine seats.

Congress	District								
Congress	1st	2nd	3rd	4th	5th	6th	7th	8th	9th
53rd (1893–1895)	Richard H. Clarke (D)	Jesse F. Stallings (D)	William C. Oates (D)	Gaston A. Robbins (D)	James E. Cobb (D)	John H. Bankhead (D)	William H. Denson (D)	Joseph; Wheeler (D)	Louis W. Turpin (D)
53rd (1893–1895)	Richard H. Clarke (D)	Jesse F. Stallings (D)	George P. Harrison Jr. (D)	Gaston A. Robbins (D)	James E. Cobb (D)	John H. Bankhead (D)	William H. Denson (D)	Joseph; Wheeler (D)	Louis W. Turpin (D)
54th (1895–1897)	Richard H. Clarke (D)	Jesse F. Stallings (D)	George P. Harrison Jr. (D)	Gaston A. Robbins (D)	James E. Cobb (D)	John H. Bankhead (D)	Milford W. Howard (Pop)	Joseph; Wheeler (D)	Oscar Underwood (D)
54th (1895–1897)	Richard H. Clarke (D)	Jesse F. Stallings (D)	George P. Harrison Jr. (D)	William F. Aldrich (R)	Albert T. Goodwyn (Pop)	John H. Bankhead (D)	Milford W. Howard (Pop)	Joseph; Wheeler (D)	Truman H. Aldrich (R)
55th (1897–1899)	George W. Taylor (D)	Jesse F. Stallings (D)	Henry D. Clayton Jr. (D)	Thomas S. Plowman (D)	Willis Brewer (D)	John H. Bankhead (D)	Milford W. Howard (Pop)	Joseph; Wheeler (D)	Oscar Underwood (D)
55th (1897–1899)	George W. Taylor (D)	Jesse F. Stallings (D)	Henry D. Clayton Jr. (D)	William F. Aldrich (R)	Willis Brewer (D)	John H. Bankhead (D)	Milford W. Howard (Pop)	Joseph; Wheeler (D)	Oscar Underwood (D)
56th (1899–1901)	George W. Taylor (D)	Jesse F. Stallings (D)	Henry D. Clayton Jr. (D)	Gaston A. Robbins (D)	Willis Brewer (D)	John H. Bankhead (D)	John L. Burnett (D)	Joseph; Wheeler (D)	Oscar Underwood (D)
56th (1899–1901)	George W. Taylor (D)	Jesse F. Stallings (D)	Henry D. Clayton Jr. (D)	William F. Aldrich (R)	Willis Brewer (D)	John H. Bankhead (D)	John L. Burnett (D)	William; Richardson (D)	Oscar Underwood (D)
57th (1901–1903)	George W. Taylor (D)	Ariosto A. Wiley (D)	Henry D. Clayton Jr. (D)	Sydney J. Bowie (D)	C. W. Thompson (D)	John H. Bankhead (D)	John L. Burnett (D)	William; Richardson (D)	Oscar Underwood (D)
58th (1903–1905)	George W. Taylor (D)	Ariosto A. Wiley (D)	Henry D. Clayton Jr. (D)	Sydney J. Bowie (D)	C. W. Thompson (D)	John H. Bankhead (D)	John L. Burnett (D)	William; Richardson (D)	Oscar Underwood (D)
58th (1903–1905)	George W. Taylor (D)	Ariosto A. Wiley (D)	Henry D. Clayton Jr. (D)	Sydney J. Bowie (D)	J. Thomas; Heflin (D)	John H. Bankhead (D)	John L. Burnett (D)	William; Richardson (D)	Oscar Underwood (D)
59th (1905–1907)	George W. Taylor (D)	Ariosto A. Wiley (D)	Henry D. Clayton Jr. (D)	Sydney J. Bowie (D)	J. Thomas; Heflin (D)	John H. Bankhead (D)	John L. Burnett (D)	William; Richardson (D)	Oscar Underwood (D)
60th (1907–1909)	George W. Taylor (D)	Ariosto A. Wiley (D)	Henry D. Clayton Jr. (D)	William Benjamin; Craig (D)	J. Thomas; Heflin (D)	Richmond P. Hobson (D)	John L. Burnett (D)	William; Richardson (D)	Oscar Underwood (D)
60th (1907–1909)	George W. Taylor (D)	Oliver C. Wiley (D)	Henry D. Clayton Jr. (D)	William Benjamin; Craig (D)	J. Thomas; Heflin (D)	Richmond P. Hobson (D)	John L. Burnett (D)	William; Richardson (D)	Oscar Underwood (D)
61st (1909–1911)	George W. Taylor (D)	S. Hubert; Dent Jr. (D)	Henry D. Clayton Jr. (D)	William Benjamin; Craig (D)	J. Thomas; Heflin (D)	Richmond P. Hobson (D)	John L. Burnett (D)	William; Richardson (D)	Oscar Underwood (D)
62nd (1911–1913)	George W. Taylor (D)	S. Hubert; Dent Jr. (D)	Henry D. Clayton Jr. (D)	Fred L. Blackmon (D)	J. Thomas; Heflin (D)	Richmond P. Hobson (D)	John L. Burnett (D)	William; Richardson (D)	Oscar Underwood (D)

=== 1913–1933: 10 seats ===
Following the 1910 census, Alabama was apportioned ten seats. At first, the extra seat was elected at-large. Starting with the 1916 elections, the seats were redistricted and a tenth district was added.

Congress	District									At-large
Congress	1st	2nd	3rd	4th	5th	6th	7th	8th	9th	At-large
63rd (1913–1915)	George W. Taylor (D)	S. Hubert; Dent Jr. (D)	Henry D. Clayton Jr. (D)	Fred L. Blackmon (D)	J. Thomas; Heflin (D)	Richmond P. Hobson (D)	John L. Burnett (D)	William Richardson (D)	Oscar; Underwood (D)	John; Abercrombie (D)
63rd (1913–1915)	George W. Taylor (D)	S. Hubert; Dent Jr. (D)	William O. Mulkey (D)	Fred L. Blackmon (D)	J. Thomas; Heflin (D)	Richmond P. Hobson (D)	John L. Burnett (D)	C. C. Harris (D)	Oscar; Underwood (D)	John; Abercrombie (D)
64th (1915–1917)	Oscar Lee; Gray (D)	S. Hubert; Dent Jr. (D)	Henry B. Steagall (D)	Fred L. Blackmon (D)	J. Thomas; Heflin (D)	William B. Oliver (D)	John L. Burnett (D)	Edward B. Almon (D)	George; Huddleston (D)	John; Abercrombie (D)
65th (1917–1919)	Oscar Lee; Gray (D)	S. Hubert; Dent Jr. (D)	Henry B. Steagall (D)	Fred L. Blackmon (D)	J. Thomas; Heflin (D)	William B. Oliver (D)	John L. Burnett (D)	Edward B. Almon (D)	George; Huddleston (D)	10th district
65th (1917–1919)	Oscar Lee; Gray (D)	S. Hubert; Dent Jr. (D)	Henry B. Steagall (D)	Fred L. Blackmon (D)	J. Thomas; Heflin (D)	William B. Oliver (D)	John L. Burnett (D)	Edward B. Almon (D)	George; Huddleston (D)	William B. Bankhead (D)
66th (1919–1921)	John; McDuffie (D)	S. Hubert; Dent Jr. (D)	Henry B. Steagall (D)	Fred L. Blackmon (D)	J. Thomas; Heflin (D)	William B. Oliver (D)	John L. Burnett (D)	Edward B. Almon (D)	George; Huddleston (D)	William B. Bankhead (D)
66th (1919–1921)	John; McDuffie (D)	S. Hubert; Dent Jr. (D)	Henry B. Steagall (D)	Fred L. Blackmon (D)	William B. Bowling (D)	William B. Oliver (D)	Lilius B. Rainey (D)	Edward B. Almon (D)	George; Huddleston (D)	William B. Bankhead (D)
67th (1921–1923)	John; McDuffie (D)	John R. Tyson (D)	Henry B. Steagall (D)	Lamar; Jeffers (D)	William B. Bowling (D)	William B. Oliver (D)	Lilius B. Rainey (D)	Edward B. Almon (D)	George; Huddleston (D)	William B. Bankhead (D)
68th (1923–1925)	John; McDuffie (D)	John R. Tyson (D)	Henry B. Steagall (D)	Lamar; Jeffers (D)	William B. Bowling (D)	William B. Oliver (D)	Miles C. Allgood (D)	Edward B. Almon (D)	George; Huddleston (D)	William B. Bankhead (D)
68th (1923–1925)	John; McDuffie (D)	J. Lister Hill (D)	Henry B. Steagall (D)	Lamar; Jeffers (D)	William B. Bowling (D)	William B. Oliver (D)	Miles C. Allgood (D)	Edward B. Almon (D)	George; Huddleston (D)	William B. Bankhead (D)
69th (1925–1927)	John; McDuffie (D)	J. Lister Hill (D)	Henry B. Steagall (D)	Lamar; Jeffers (D)	William B. Bowling (D)	William B. Oliver (D)	Miles C. Allgood (D)	Edward B. Almon (D)	George; Huddleston (D)	William B. Bankhead (D)
70th (1927–1929)	John; McDuffie (D)	J. Lister Hill (D)	Henry B. Steagall (D)	Lamar; Jeffers (D)	William B. Bowling (D)	William B. Oliver (D)	Miles C. Allgood (D)	Edward B. Almon (D)	George; Huddleston (D)	William B. Bankhead (D)
70th (1927–1929)	John; McDuffie (D)	J. Lister Hill (D)	Henry B. Steagall (D)	Lamar; Jeffers (D)	LaFayette L. Patterson (D)	William B. Oliver (D)	Miles C. Allgood (D)	Edward B. Almon (D)	George; Huddleston (D)	William B. Bankhead (D)
71st (1929–1931)	John; McDuffie (D)	J. Lister Hill (D)	Henry B. Steagall (D)	Lamar; Jeffers (D)	LaFayette L. Patterson (D)	William B. Oliver (D)	Miles C. Allgood (D)	Edward B. Almon (D)	George; Huddleston (D)	William B. Bankhead (D)
72nd (1931–1933)	John; McDuffie (D)	J. Lister Hill (D)	Henry B. Steagall (D)	Lamar; Jeffers (D)	LaFayette L. Patterson (D)	William B. Oliver (D)	Miles C. Allgood (D)	Edward B. Almon (D)	George; Huddleston (D)	William B. Bankhead (D)

=== 1933–1963: 9 seats ===
Following the 1930 census, Alabama was apportioned nine seats.

Congress	1st district	2nd district	3rd district	4th district	5th district	6th district	7th district	8th district	9th district
73rd (1933–1935)	John McDuffie (D)	J. Lister Hill (D)	Henry B. Steagall (D)	Lamar Jeffers (D)	Miles C. Allgood (D)	William B. Oliver (D)	William B. Bankhead (D)	Archibald H. Carmichael (D)	George; Huddleston (D)
74th (1935–1937)	Frank W. Boykin (D)	J. Lister Hill (D)	Henry B. Steagall (D)	Sam Hobbs (D)	Joe Starnes (D)	William B. Oliver (D)	William B. Bankhead (D)	Archibald H. Carmichael (D)	George; Huddleston (D)
75th (1937–1939)	Frank W. Boykin (D)	J. Lister Hill (D)	Henry B. Steagall (D)	Sam Hobbs (D)	Joe Starnes (D)	Pete Jarman (D)	William B. Bankhead (D)	John; Sparkman (D)	Luther Patrick (D)
75th (1937–1939)	Frank W. Boykin (D)	George M. Grant (D)	Henry B. Steagall (D)	Sam Hobbs (D)	Joe Starnes (D)	Pete Jarman (D)	William B. Bankhead (D)	John; Sparkman (D)	Luther Patrick (D)
76th (1939–1941)	Frank W. Boykin (D)	George M. Grant (D)	Henry B. Steagall (D)	Sam Hobbs (D)	Joe Starnes (D)	Pete Jarman (D)	William B. Bankhead (D)	John; Sparkman (D)	Luther Patrick (D)
76th (1939–1941)	Frank W. Boykin (D)	George M. Grant (D)	Henry B. Steagall (D)	Sam Hobbs (D)	Joe Starnes (D)	Pete Jarman (D)	Zadoc Weatherford (D)	John; Sparkman (D)	Luther Patrick (D)
77th (1941–1943)	Frank W. Boykin (D)	George M. Grant (D)	Henry B. Steagall (D)	Sam Hobbs (D)	Joe Starnes (D)	Pete Jarman (D)	Walter Bankhead (D)	John; Sparkman (D)	Luther Patrick (D)
77th (1941–1943)	Frank W. Boykin (D)	George M. Grant (D)	Henry B. Steagall (D)	Sam Hobbs (D)	Joe Starnes (D)	Pete Jarman (D)	Carter Manasco (D)	John; Sparkman (D)	Luther Patrick (D)
78th (1943–1945)	Frank W. Boykin (D)	George M. Grant (D)	George W. Andrews (D)	Sam Hobbs (D)	Joe Starnes (D)	Pete Jarman (D)	Carter Manasco (D)	John; Sparkman (D)	John Newsome (D)
79th (1945–1947)	Frank W. Boykin (D)	George M. Grant (D)	George W. Andrews (D)	Sam Hobbs (D)	Albert Rains (D)	Pete Jarman (D)	Carter Manasco (D)	John; Sparkman (D)	Luther Patrick (D)
80th (1947–1949)	Frank W. Boykin (D)	George M. Grant (D)	George W. Andrews (D)	Sam Hobbs (D)	Albert Rains (D)	Pete Jarman (D)	Carter Manasco (D)	Bob; Jones (D)	Laurie C. Battle (D)
81st (1949–1951)	Frank W. Boykin (D)	George M. Grant (D)	George W. Andrews (D)	Sam Hobbs (D)	Albert Rains (D)	Edward deGraffenried (D)	Carl Elliott (D)	Bob; Jones (D)	Laurie C. Battle (D)
82nd (1951–1953)	Frank W. Boykin (D)	George M. Grant (D)	George W. Andrews (D)	Kenneth A. Roberts (D)	Albert Rains (D)	Edward deGraffenried (D)	Carl Elliott (D)	Bob; Jones (D)	Laurie C. Battle (D)
83rd (1953–1955)	Frank W. Boykin (D)	George M. Grant (D)	George W. Andrews (D)	Kenneth A. Roberts (D)	Albert Rains (D)	Armistead I. Selden Jr. (D)	Carl Elliott (D)	Bob; Jones (D)	Laurie C. Battle (D)
84th (1955–1957)	Frank W. Boykin (D)	George M. Grant (D)	George W. Andrews (D)	Kenneth A. Roberts (D)	Albert Rains (D)	Armistead I. Selden Jr. (D)	Carl Elliott (D)	Bob; Jones (D)	George; Huddleston Jr. (D)
85th (1957–1959)	Frank W. Boykin (D)	George M. Grant (D)	George W. Andrews (D)	Kenneth A. Roberts (D)	Albert Rains (D)	Armistead I. Selden Jr. (D)	Carl Elliott (D)	Bob; Jones (D)	George; Huddleston Jr. (D)
86th (1959–1961)	Frank W. Boykin (D)	George M. Grant (D)	George W. Andrews (D)	Kenneth A. Roberts (D)	Albert Rains (D)	Armistead I. Selden Jr. (D)	Carl Elliott (D)	Bob; Jones (D)	George; Huddleston Jr. (D)
87th (1961–1963)	Frank W. Boykin (D)	George M. Grant (D)	George W. Andrews (D)	Kenneth A. Roberts (D)	Albert Rains (D)	Armistead I. Selden Jr. (D)	Carl Elliott (D)	Bob; Jones (D)	George; Huddleston Jr. (D)

=== 1963–1973: 8 seats ===
Following the 1960 census, Alabama was apportioned eight seats. During the 88th Congress, those seats were all elected statewide at-large on a general ticket.

Congress	8 seats elected on a general ticket from Alabama's at-large district							
Congress	1st seat	2nd seat	3rd seat	4th seat	5th seat	6th seat	7th seat	8th seat
88th (1963–1965)	George; Huddleston Jr. (D)	George M. Grant (D)	George Andrews (D)	Kenneth A. Roberts (D)	Armistead I. Selden Jr. (D)	Albert Rains (D)	Carl Elliott (D)	Bob; Jones (D)
Congress	District							
Congress	1st	2nd	3rd	4th	5th	6th	7th	8th
89th (1965–1967)	Jack Edwards (R)	Bill; Dickinson (R)	George Andrews (D)	Glenn Andrews (R)	Armistead I. Selden Jr. (D)	John H. Buchanan; Jr. (R)	James D. Martin (R)	Bob; Jones (D)
90th (1967–1969)	Jack Edwards (R)	Bill; Dickinson (R)	George Andrews (D)	Bill Nichols (D)	Armistead I. Selden Jr. (D)	John H. Buchanan; Jr. (R)	Tom Bevill (D)	Bob; Jones (D)
91st (1969–1971)	Jack Edwards (R)	Bill; Dickinson (R)	George Andrews (D)	Bill Nichols (D)	Walter Flowers (D)	John H. Buchanan; Jr. (R)	Tom Bevill (D)	Bob; Jones (D)
92nd (1971–1973)	Jack Edwards (R)	Bill; Dickinson (R)	George Andrews (D)	Bill Nichols (D)	Walter Flowers (D)	John H. Buchanan; Jr. (R)	Tom Bevill (D)	Bob; Jones (D)
92nd (1971–1973)	Jack Edwards (R)	Bill; Dickinson (R)	Elizabeth Andrews (D)	Bill Nichols (D)	Walter Flowers (D)	John H. Buchanan; Jr. (R)	Tom Bevill (D)	Bob; Jones (D)

=== 1973–present: 7 seats ===
Since the 1970 census, Alabama has been apportioned seven seats.

Congress	1st district	2nd district	3rd district	4th district	5th district	6th district	7th district
93rd (1973–1975)	Jack Edwards (R)	Bill; Dickinson (R)	Bill Nichols (D)	Tom Bevill (D)	Bob; Jones (D)	John H. Buchanan Jr. (R)	Walter; Flowers (D)
94th (1975–1977)	Jack Edwards (R)	Bill; Dickinson (R)	Bill Nichols (D)	Tom Bevill (D)	Bob; Jones (D)	John H. Buchanan Jr. (R)	Walter; Flowers (D)
95th (1977–1979)	Jack Edwards (R)	Bill; Dickinson (R)	Bill Nichols (D)	Tom Bevill (D)	Ronnie Flippo (D)	John H. Buchanan Jr. (R)	Walter; Flowers (D)
96th (1979–1981)	Jack Edwards (R)	Bill; Dickinson (R)	Bill Nichols (D)	Tom Bevill (D)	Ronnie Flippo (D)	John H. Buchanan Jr. (R)	Richard; Shelby (D)
97th (1981–1983)	Jack Edwards (R)	Bill; Dickinson (R)	Bill Nichols (D)	Tom Bevill (D)	Ronnie Flippo (D)	Albert Smith Jr. (R)	Richard; Shelby (D)
98th (1983–1985)	Jack Edwards (R)	Bill; Dickinson (R)	Bill Nichols (D)	Tom Bevill (D)	Ronnie Flippo (D)	Ben Erdreich (D)	Richard; Shelby (D)
99th (1985–1987)	Sonny; Callahan (R)	Bill; Dickinson (R)	Bill Nichols (D)	Tom Bevill (D)	Ronnie Flippo (D)	Ben Erdreich (D)	Richard; Shelby (D)
100th (1987–1989)	Sonny; Callahan (R)	Bill; Dickinson (R)	Bill Nichols (D)	Tom Bevill (D)	Ronnie Flippo (D)	Ben Erdreich (D)	Claude; Harris Jr. (D)
101st (1989–1991)	Sonny; Callahan (R)	Bill; Dickinson (R)	Glen Browder (D)	Tom Bevill (D)	Ronnie Flippo (D)	Ben Erdreich (D)	Claude; Harris Jr. (D)
102nd (1991–1993)	Sonny; Callahan (R)	Bill; Dickinson (R)	Glen Browder (D)	Tom Bevill (D)	Bud; Cramer (D)	Ben Erdreich (D)	Claude; Harris Jr. (D)
103rd (1993–1995)	Sonny; Callahan (R)	Terry Everett (R)	Glen Browder (D)	Tom Bevill (D)	Bud; Cramer (D)	Spencer Bachus (R)	Earl; Hillard Sr. (D)
104th (1995–1997)	Sonny; Callahan (R)	Terry Everett (R)	Glen Browder (D)	Tom Bevill (D)	Bud; Cramer (D)	Spencer Bachus (R)	Earl; Hillard Sr. (D)
105th (1997–1999)	Sonny; Callahan (R)	Terry Everett (R)	Bob Riley (R)	Robert; Aderholt (R)	Bud; Cramer (D)	Spencer Bachus (R)	Earl; Hillard Sr. (D)
106th (1999–2001)	Sonny; Callahan (R)	Terry Everett (R)	Bob Riley (R)	Robert; Aderholt (R)	Bud; Cramer (D)	Spencer Bachus (R)	Earl; Hillard Sr. (D)
107th (2001–2003)	Sonny; Callahan (R)	Terry Everett (R)	Bob Riley (R)	Robert; Aderholt (R)	Bud; Cramer (D)	Spencer Bachus (R)	Earl; Hillard Sr. (D)
108th (2003–2005)	Jo Bonner (R)	Terry Everett (R)	Mike Rogers (R)	Robert; Aderholt (R)	Bud; Cramer (D)	Spencer Bachus (R)	Artur Davis (D)
109th (2005–2007)	Jo Bonner (R)	Terry Everett (R)	Mike Rogers (R)	Robert; Aderholt (R)	Bud; Cramer (D)	Spencer Bachus (R)	Artur Davis (D)
110th (2007–2009)	Jo Bonner (R)	Terry Everett (R)	Mike Rogers (R)	Robert; Aderholt (R)	Bud; Cramer (D)	Spencer Bachus (R)	Artur Davis (D)
111th (2009–2011)	Jo Bonner (R)	Bobby Bright (D)	Mike Rogers (R)	Robert; Aderholt (R)	Parker Griffith (D)	Spencer Bachus (R)	Artur Davis (D)
111th (2009–2011)	Jo Bonner (R)	Bobby Bright (D)	Mike Rogers (R)	Robert; Aderholt (R)	Parker Griffith (R)	Spencer Bachus (R)	Artur Davis (D)
112th (2011–2013)	Jo Bonner (R)	Martha Roby (R)	Mike Rogers (R)	Robert; Aderholt (R)	Mo Brooks (R)	Spencer Bachus (R)	Terri Sewell (D)
113th (2013–2015)	Jo Bonner (R)	Martha Roby (R)	Mike Rogers (R)	Robert; Aderholt (R)	Mo Brooks (R)	Spencer Bachus (R)	Terri Sewell (D)
113th (2013–2015)	Bradley Byrne (R)	Martha Roby (R)	Mike Rogers (R)	Robert; Aderholt (R)	Mo Brooks (R)	Spencer Bachus (R)	Terri Sewell (D)
114th (2015–2017)	Bradley Byrne (R)	Martha Roby (R)	Mike Rogers (R)	Robert; Aderholt (R)	Mo Brooks (R)	Gary Palmer (R)	Terri Sewell (D)
115th (2017–2019)	Bradley Byrne (R)	Martha Roby (R)	Mike Rogers (R)	Robert; Aderholt (R)	Mo Brooks (R)	Gary Palmer (R)	Terri Sewell (D)
116th (2019–2021)	Bradley Byrne (R)	Martha Roby (R)	Mike Rogers (R)	Robert; Aderholt (R)	Mo Brooks (R)	Gary Palmer (R)	Terri Sewell (D)
117th (2021–2023)	Jerry Carl (R)	Barry Moore (R)	Mike Rogers (R)	Robert; Aderholt (R)	Mo Brooks (R)	Gary Palmer (R)	Terri Sewell (D)
118th (2023–2025)	Jerry Carl (R)	Barry Moore (R)	Mike Rogers (R)	Robert; Aderholt (R)	Dale Strong (R)	Gary Palmer (R)	Terri Sewell (D)
119th (2025–2027)	Barry Moore (R)	Shomari Figures (D)	Mike Rogers (R)	Robert; Aderholt (R)	Dale Strong (R)	Gary Palmer (R)	Terri Sewell (D)
120th (2027–2029)	Jerry Carl (R)	Shomari Figures (D)	Mike Rogers (R)	Robert; Aderholt (R)	Dale Strong (R)	Gary Palmer (R)	Terri Sewell (D)

== Key ==
Democratic (D)
Democratic-Republican (DR)
Greenback (GB)
Jacksonian (J)
Know Nothing (KN)
National Republican (NR)
Nullifier (N)
Populist (Pop)
Republican (R)
Union (U)
Whig (W)

== See also ==
- List of United States congressional districts
- Alabama's congressional districts
- Political party strength in Alabama
