= List of United States representatives from Alabama =

The following is an alphabetical list of United States representatives from the state of Alabama. For chronological tables of members of both chambers of the United States Congress from the state (through the present day), see Alabama's congressional delegations.

== Current members ==
Updated January 3, 2025.

- 1st district: Barry Moore (R) (2021–present)
- 2nd district: Shomari Figures (D) (2025–present)
- 3rd district: Mike D. Rogers (R) (2003–present)
- 4th district: Robert Aderholt (R) (1997–present)
- 5th district: Dale Strong (R) (2023–present)
- 6th district: Gary Palmer (R) (2015–present)
- 7th district: Terri Sewell (D) (2011–present)

== List of members ==
Representative	Years	Party	District	Notes
James Abercrombie	March 4, 1851 – March 4, 1855	Whig	2nd	Elected in 1851. Retired.
John Abercrombie	March 4, 1913 – March 4, 1917	Democratic	At-large	Elected in 1912. Retired.
Robert Aderholt	January 3, 1997 – present	Republican	4th	Elected in 1996. Incumbent.
Truman H. Aldrich	June 9, 1896 – March 4, 1897	Republican	9th	Won contested election. Retired.
William F. Aldrich	March 13, 1896 – March 4, 1897	Republican	4th	Won contested election. Lost re-election to Plowman.
William F. Aldrich	February 9, 1898 – March 4, 1899	Republican	4th	Won contested election. Lost re-election to Robbins.
William F. Aldrich	March 8, 1900 – March 4, 1901	Republican	4th	Won contested election. Retired.
Miles C. Allgood	March 4, 1923 – March 4, 1933	Democratic	7th	Elected in 1922. Redistricted to the 5th district.
Miles C. Allgood	March 4, 1933 – January 3, 1935	Democratic	5th	Redistricted from the 7th district and re-elected in 1932. Lost renomination to Starnes.
Edward B. Almon	March 4, 1915 – June 2, 1933	Democratic	8th	Elected in 1914. Died.
William J. Alston	March 4, 1849 – March 4, 1851	Whig	1st	Elected in 1849. Retired.
Elizabeth B. Andrews	April 4, 1972 – January 3, 1973	Democratic	3rd	Elected to finish her husband's term. Retired.
George W. Andrews	March 14, 1944 – January 3, 1963	Democratic	3rd	Elected to finish Steagall's term. Redistricted to the at-large district.
George W. Andrews	January 3, 1963 – January 3, 1965	Democratic	At-large	Redistricted from the 3rd district and re-elected in 1962. Redistricted to the 3rd district.
George W. Andrews	January 3, 1965 – December 25, 1971	Democratic	3rd	Redistricted from the at-large district and re-elected in 1964. Died.
Glenn Andrews	January 3, 1965 – January 3, 1967	Republican	4th	Elected in 1964. Lost re-election to Nichols.
Spencer Bachus	January 3, 1993 – January 3, 2015	Republican	6th	Elected in 1992. Retired.
John H. Bankhead	March 4, 1887 – March 4, 1907	Democratic	6th	Elected in 1886. Lost renomination to Hobson.
Walter W. Bankhead	January 3, 1941 – February 1, 1941	Democratic	7th	Elected in 1940. Resigned.
William B. Bankhead	March 4, 1917 – March 4, 1933	Democratic	10th	Elected in 1916. Redistricted to the 7th district.
William B. Bankhead	March 4, 1933 – September 15, 1940	Democratic	7th	Redistricted from the 10th district and re-elected in 1932. Died.
Laurie C. Battle	January 3, 1947 – January 3, 1955	Democratic	9th	Elected in 1946. Retired.
Robert E.B. Baylor	March 4, 1829 – March 4, 1831	Jacksonian	2nd	Elected in 1829. Lost re-election to Mardis.
James E. Belser	March 4, 1843 – March 4, 1845	Democratic	2nd	Elected in 1843. Retired.
Tom Bevill	January 3, 1967 – January 3, 1973	Democratic	7th	Elected in 1966. Redistricted to the 4th district.
Tom Bevill	January 3, 1973 – January 3, 1997	Democratic	4th	Redistricted from the 7th district and re-elected in 1972. Retired.
Fred L. Blackmon	March 4, 1911 – February 8, 1921	Democratic	4th	Elected in 1910. Re-elected but died before next term began.
Jo Bonner	January 3, 2003 – August 2, 2013	Republican	1st	Elected in 2002. Resigned to become vice-chancellor of the University of Alabama System
Franklin Welsh Bowdon	December 7, 1846 – March 4, 1851	Democratic	7th	Elected to finish McConnell's term. Retired.
Sydney J. Bowie	March 4, 1901 – March 4, 1907	Democratic	4th	Elected in 1900. Retired.
William B. Bowling	December 14, 1920 – August 16, 1928	Democratic	5th	Elected to finish Heflin's term. Resigned when appointed judge for 5th Alabama Circuit.
Frank W. Boykin	July 30, 1935 – January 3, 1963	Democratic	1st	Elected to finish McDuffie's term. Redistricted to the at-large district and lost renomination to Huddleston Jr.
Taul Bradford	March 4, 1875 – March 4, 1877	Democratic	3rd	Elected in 1874. Retired.
John Bragg	March 4, 1851 – March 4, 1853	Democratic	1st	Elected in 1851. Retired.
Willis Brewer	March 4, 1897 – March 4, 1901	Democratic	5th	Elected in 1896. Lost renomination to Thompson.
Bobby Bright	January 3, 2009 – January 3, 2011	Democratic	2nd	Elected in 2008. Lost re-election to Roby.
Frederick G. Bromberg	March 4, 1873 – March 4, 1875	Liberal Republican	1st	Elected in 1872. Lost re-election to Haralson.
Mo Brooks	January 3, 2011 – January 3, 2023	Republican	5th	Elected in 2010. Retired to run for U.S. senator.
Glen Browder	April 4, 1989 – January 3, 1997	Democratic	3rd	Elected to finish Nichols's term. Retired to run for U.S. senator.
John Hall Buchanan Jr.	January 3, 1965 – January 3, 1981	Republican	6th	Elected in 1964. Lost renomination to A. Smith.
Alfred E. Buck	March 4, 1869 – March 4, 1871	Republican	1st	Elected in 1868. Retired.
Charles W. Buckley	July 21, 1868 – March 4, 1873	Republican	2nd	Elected to finish the vacant term. Retired.
John L. Burnett	March 4, 1899 – May 13, 1919	Democratic	7th	Elected in 1898. Died.
Bradley Byrne	January 7, 2014 – January 3, 2021	Republican	1st	Elected to finish Bonner's term. Retired to run for U.S. Senator.
John Henry Caldwell	March 4, 1873 – March 4, 1877	Democratic	5th	Elected in 1872. Retired.
Sonny Callahan	January 3, 1985 – January 3, 2003	Republican	1st	Elected in 1984. Retired.
John B. Callis	July 21, 1868 – March 4, 1869	Republican	5th	Elected to finish the vacant term. Retired.
Jerry Carl	January 3, 2021 – January 3, 2025	Republican	1st	Elected in 2020. Redistricted to the 1st district and lost renomination to Barry Moore.
Archibald Hill Carmichael	November 14, 1933 – January 3, 1937	Democratic	8th	Elected to finish Almon's term. Retired.
Reuben Chapman	March 4, 1835 – March 4, 1837	Jacksonian	1st	Elected in 1835. Switched parties.
Reuben Chapman	March 4, 1837 – March 4, 1841	Democratic	1st	Re-elected in 1837 as a Democrat. Redistricted to the at-large district.
Reuben Chapman	March 4, 1841 – March 4, 1843	Democratic	At-large	Redistricted from the 1st district and re-elected in 1841. Redistricted to the 6th district.
Reuben Chapman	March 4, 1843 – March 4, 1847	Democratic	6th	Redistricted from the at-large district and re-elected in 1843. Retired to run for governor.
Richard Henry Clarke	March 4, 1889 – March 4, 1897	Democratic	1st	Elected in 1888. Retired to run for governor.
Clement Comer Clay	March 4, 1829 – March 4, 1835	Jacksonian	1st	Elected in 1829. Retired to run for governor.
Henry D. Clayton	March 4, 1897 – May 25, 1914	Democratic	3rd	Elected in 1896. Resigned to become a US judge for the Middle and Northern District of Alabama.
Newton N. Clements	December 8, 1880 – March 4, 1881	Democratic	6th	Elected to finish Lewis's term. Retired.
David Clopton	March 4, 1859 – January 21, 1861	Democratic	3rd	Elected in 1859. Withdrew due to Civil War.
James E. Cobb	March 4, 1887 – April 21, 1896	Democratic	5th	Elected in 1886. Lost contested election to Goodwyn.
Williamson R. W. Cobb	March 4, 1847 – January 30, 1861	Democratic	6th	Elected in 1847. Withdrew due to Civil War.
James L. Cottrell	December 7, 1846 – March 4, 1847	Democratic	3rd	Elected to finish Yancey's term. Retired.
George W. Crabb	September 4, 1838 – March 4, 1841	Whig	3rd	Elected to finish Lawler's term. Redistricted to the at-large district and lost re-election to 5 others. (Note: Chapman, Houston, D. Lewis, Payne and Shields)
George H. Craig	January 9, 1885 – March 4, 1885	Republican	4th	Won contested election. Lost re-election to Davidson.
William B. Craig	March 4, 1907 – March 4, 1911	Democratic	4th	Elected in 1906. Retired.
Bud Cramer	January 3, 1991 – January 3, 2009	Democratic	5th	Elected in 1990. Retired.
John Crowell	January 29, 1818 – March 3, 1819	Independent	Territory	Elected in 1818. (Note: but might have been elected in early 1819.); Redistricted to the at-large district.
John Crowell	December 14, 1819 – March 3, 1821	Democratic-Republican	At-large	Elected in 1819. Retired.
Jabez L. M. Curry	March 4, 1857 – January 21, 1861	Democratic	7th	Elected in 1857. Withdrew due to Civil War.
Edmund S. Dargan	March 4, 1845 – March 4, 1847	Democratic	1st	Elected in 1845. Retired.
Alexander C. Davidson	March 4, 1885 – March 4, 1889	Democratic	4th	Elected in 1884. Lost renomination to Turpin.
Artur Davis	January 3, 2003 – January 3, 2011	Democratic	7th	Elected in 2002. Retired to run for governor.
Edward deGraffenried	January 3, 1949 – January 3, 1953	Democratic	6th	Elected in 1948. Lost renomination to Selden.
James Dellet	March 4, 1839 – March 4, 1841	Whig	5th	Elected in 1838. Redistricted to the at-large district and lost re-election to 5 others.
James Dellet	March 4, 1843 – March 4, 1845	Whig	1st	Elected in 1843. Retired.
William Henry Denson	March 4, 1893 – March 4, 1895	Democratic	7th	Elected in 1892. Lost renomination.
S. Hubert Dent Jr.	March 4, 1909 – March 4, 1921	Democratic	2nd	Elected in 1908. Lost renomination to Tyson.
William Louis Dickinson	January 3, 1965 – January 3, 1993	Republican	2nd	Elected in 1964. Retired.
James F. Dowdell	March 4, 1853 – March 4, 1855	Democratic	7th	Elected in 1853. Redistricted to the 3rd district.
James F. Dowdell	March 4, 1855 – March 4, 1859	Democratic	3rd	Redistricted from the 7th district and re-elected in 1855. Retired.
Peter M. Dox	March 4, 1869 – March 4, 1873	Democratic	5th	Elected in 1868. Retired.
Jack Edwards	January 3, 1965 – January 3, 1985	Republican	1st	Elected in 1964. Retired.
Carl Elliott	January 3, 1949 – January 3, 1963	Democratic	7th	Elected in 1948. Redistricted to the at-large district.
Carl Elliott	January 3, 1963 – January 3, 1965	Democratic	At-large	Redistricted from the 7th district and re-elected in 1962. Redistricted to the 7th district and lost renomination to George C. Hawkins.
Ben Erdreich	January 3, 1983 – January 3, 1993	Democratic	6th	Elected in 1982. Lost re-election to Bachus.
Terry Everett	January 3, 1993 – January 3, 2009	Republican	2nd	Elected in 1992. Retired.
Shomari Figures	January 3, 2025 – present	Democratic	2nd	Elected in 2024. Incumbent.
Ronnie Flippo	January 3, 1977 – January 3, 1991	Democratic	5th	Elected in 1976. Retired to run for governor.
Walter Flowers	January 3, 1969 – January 3, 1973	Democratic	5th	Elected in 1968. Redistricted to the 7th district.
Walter Flowers	January 3, 1973 – January 3, 1979	Democratic	7th	Redistricted from the 5th district and re-elected in 1972. Retired to run for U.S. senator.
William H. Forney	March 4, 1875 – March 4, 1877	Democratic	At-large	Elected in 1874. Redistricted to the 7th district.
William H. Forney	March 4, 1877 – March 4, 1893	Democratic	7th	Redistricted from the at-large district and re-elected in 1876. Retired.
William Willis Garth	March 4, 1877 – March 4, 1879	Democratic	8th	Elected in 1878. Lost re-election to Wheeler.
John Gayle	March 4, 1847 – March 4, 1849	Whig	1st	Elected in 1847. Retired.
Albert T. Goodwyn	April 21, 1896 – March 4, 1897	Populist	5th	Won contested election. Lost re-election to Brewer.
George M. Grant	June 14, 1938 – January 3, 1963	Democratic	2nd	Elected to finish Hill's term. Redistricted to the at-large district.
George M. Grant	January 3, 1963 – January 3, 1965	Democratic	At-large	Redistricted from the 2nd district and re-elected in 1962. Redistricted to the 2nd district and lost re-election to Dickinson.
Oscar L. Gray	March 4, 1915 – March 4, 1919	Democratic	1st	Elected in 1914. Retired.
Parker Griffith	January 3, 2009 – December 22, 2009	Democratic	5th	Elected in 2008. Switched parties.
Parker Griffith	December 22, 2009 – January 3, 2011	Republican	5th	Switched parties. Lost Republican renomination to Brooks.
William A. Handley	March 4, 1871 – March 4, 1873	Democratic	3rd	Elected in 1870. Retired.
Jeremiah Haralson	March 4, 1875 – March 4, 1877	Republican	1st	Elected in 1874. Redistricted to the 4th district and lost re-election to Shelley.
Christopher C. Harris	May 11, 1914 – March 4, 1915	Democratic	8th	Elected to finish Richardson's term. Retired.
Claude Harris Jr.	January 3, 1987 – January 3, 1993	Democratic	7th	Elected in 1986. Retired.
Sampson W. Harris	March 4, 1847 – March 4, 1855	Democratic	3rd	Elected in 1847. Redistricted to the 7th district.
Sampson W. Harris	March 4, 1855 – March 4, 1857	Democratic	7th	Redistricted from the 3rd district and re-elected in 1855. Retired.
George Paul Harrison Jr.	November 6, 1894 – March 4, 1897	Democratic	3rd	Elected to finish Oates's term. Retired.
Thomas Haughey	July 21, 1868 – March 4, 1869	Republican	6th	Elected to finish the partial term. Lost re-election as an Independent Republican to Sherrod.
Charles Hays	March 4, 1869 – March 4, 1877	Republican	4th	Elected in 1868. Retired.
J. Thomas Heflin	May 19, 1904 – November 1, 1920	Democratic	5th	Elected to finish Thompson's term. Retired to run for U.S. senator and resigned when elected.
Robert S. Heflin	March 4, 1869 – March 4, 1871	Republican	3rd	Elected in 1868. Retired.
Hilary A. Herbert	March 4, 1877 – March 4, 1893	Democratic	2nd	Elected in 1876. Retired.
Thomas H. Herndon	March 4, 1879 – March 28, 1883	Democratic	1st	Elected in 1878. Died.
Goldsmith W. Hewitt	March 4, 1875 – March 4, 1879	Democratic	6th	Elected in 1874. Retired.
Goldsmith W. Hewitt	March 4, 1881 – March 4, 1885	Democratic	6th	Elected in 1880. Retired.
J. Lister Hill	August 14, 1923 – January 11, 1938	Democratic	2nd	Elected to finish Tyson's term. Resigned when appointed U.S. Senator.
Earl F. Hilliard	January 3, 1993 – January 3, 2003	Democratic	7th	Elected in 1992. Lost renomination to Davis.
Henry W. Hilliard	March 4, 1845 – March 4, 1851	Whig	2nd	Elected in 1845. Retired.
Sam Hobbs	January 3, 1935 – January 3, 1951	Democratic	4th	Elected in 1934. Retired.
Richmond P. Hobson	March 4, 1907 – March 4, 1915	Democratic	6th	Elected in 1906. Lost renomination to Oliver.
George S. Houston	March 4, 1841 – March 4, 1843	Democratic	At-large	Elected in 1841. Redistricted to the 5th district.
George S. Houston	March 4, 1843 – March 4, 1849	Democratic	5th	Redistricted from the at-large district and re-elected in 1842. Retired.
George S. Houston	March 4, 1851 – January 21, 1861	Democratic	5th	Elected in 1850. Withdrew due to Civil War.
Milford W. Howard	March 4, 1895 – March 4, 1899	Populist	7th	Elected in 1894. Retired.
David Hubbard	March 4, 1839 – March 4, 1841	Democratic	2nd	Elected in 1839. Redistricted to the at-large district and lost re-election to 5 others.
David Hubbard	March 4, 1849 – March 4, 1851	Democratic	5th	Elected in 1848. Lost re-election to Houston.
George Huddleston	March 4, 1915 – January 3, 1937	Democratic	9th	Elected in 1914. Lost renomination to Patrick.
George Huddleston Jr.	January 3, 1955 – January 3, 1963	Democratic	9th	Elected in 1954. Redistricted to the at-large district.
George Huddleston Jr.	January 3, 1963 – January 3, 1965	Democratic	At-large	Redistricted from the 9th district and re-elected in 1962. Redistricted to the 6th district and lost re-election to Buchanan.
Samuel Williams Inge	March 4, 1847 – March 4, 1851	Democratic	4th	Elected in 1847. Retired.
Pete Jarman	January 3, 1937 – January 3, 1949	Democratic	6th	Elected in 1936. Lost renomination to deGraffenried.
Lamar Jeffers	June 7, 1921 – January 3, 1935	Democratic	4th	Elected to finish Blackmon's term. Lost renomination to Hobbs.
James T. Jones	March 4, 1877 – March 4, 1879	Democratic	1st	Elected in 1876. Lost renomination to Herndon.
James T. Jones	December 3, 1883 – March 4, 1889	Democratic	1st	Elected to finish Herndon's term. Retired.
Robert E. Jones Jr.	January 28, 1947 – January 3, 1963	Democratic	8th	Elected to finish Sparkman's term. Redistricted to the at-large district.
Robert E. Jones Jr.	January 3, 1963 – January 3, 1965	Democratic	At-large	Redistricted from the 8th district and re-elected in 1962. Redistricted to the 8th district.
Robert E. Jones Jr.	January 3, 1965 – January 3, 1973	Democratic	8th	Redistricted from the at-large district and re-elected in 1964. Redistricted to the 5th district.
Robert E. Jones Jr.	January 3, 1973 – January 3, 1977	Democratic	5th	Redistricted from the 8th district and re-elected in 1972. Retired.
Francis William Kellogg	July 22, 1868 – March 4, 1869	Republican	1st	Elected to finish the vacant term. Retired.
Joab Lawler	March 4, 1835 – May 8, 1838	Whig	3rd	Elected in 1835. Died.
Burwell Boykin Lewis	March 4, 1875 – March 4, 1877	Democratic	At-large	Elected in 1874. Redistricted to the 6th district and lost re-election to Hewitt.
Burwell Boykin Lewis	March 4, 1879 – October 1, 1880	Democratic	6th	Elected in 1878. Resigned to become President of the University of Alabama.
Dixon Hall Lewis	March 4, 1829 – March 4, 1833	Jacksonian	3rd	Elected in 1829. Redistricted to the 4th district.
Dixon Hall Lewis	March 4, 1833 – March 4, 1837	Nullifier	4th	Redistricted from the 3rd district and re-elected in 1833. Switched parties.
Dixon Hall Lewis	March 4, 1837 – March 4, 1841	Democratic	4th	Re-elected in 1837 as a Democrat. Redistricted to the at-large district.
Dixon Hall Lewis	March 4, 1841 – March 4, 1843	Democratic	At-large	Redistricted from the 4th district and re-elected in 1841. Redistricted to the 3rd district.
Dixon Hall Lewis	March 4, 1843 – April 22, 1844	Democratic	3rd	Redistricted from the at-large district and re-elected in 1843. Resigned when appointed U.S. senator.
Robert F. Ligon	March 4, 1877 – March 4, 1879	Democratic	5th	Elected in 1876. Lost renomination to T. Williams.
William M. Lowe	March 4, 1879 – March 4, 1881	Greenback	8th	Elected in 1878. Lost re-election to Wheeler.
William M. Lowe	June 3, 1882 – October 12, 1882	Greenback	8th	Won contested election. Died.
Francis S. Lyon	March 4, 1835 – March 4, 1837	Anti-Jacksonian	5th	Elected in 1834. Switched parties.
Francis S. Lyon	March 4, 1837 – March 4, 1839	Whig	5th	Re-elected in 1836 as a Whig. Retired.
Carter Manasco	June 24, 1941 – January 3, 1949	Democratic	7th	Elected to finish Walter Bankhead's term. Lost renomination to Elliott.
Samuel W. Mardis	March 4, 1831 – March 4, 1833	Jacksonian	2nd	Elected in 1831. Redistricted to the 3rd district.
Samuel W. Mardis	March 4, 1833 – March 4, 1835	Jacksonian	3rd	Redistricted from the 2nd district and re-elected in 1833. Retired.
James D. Martin	January 3, 1965 – January 3, 1967	Republican	7th	Elected in 1964. Retired to run for governor.
John Mason Martin	March 4, 1885 – March 4, 1887	Democratic	6th	Elected in 1884. Lost re-election to J. Bankhead.
Joshua L. Martin	March 4, 1835 – March 4, 1837	Jacksonian	2nd	Elected in 1835. Switched parties.
Joshua L. Martin	March 4, 1837 – March 4, 1839	Democratic	2nd	Re-elected in 1837 as a Democrat. Retired.
Felix G. McConnell	March 4, 1843 – September 10, 1846	Democratic	7th	Elected in 1843. Died.
John McDuffie	March 4, 1919 – March 2, 1935	Democratic	1st	Elected in 1918. Resigned to become U.S. District Judge.
John Van McDuffie	June 4, 1890 – March 4, 1891	Republican	4th	Won contested election. Lost re-election to Turpin.
John McKee	March 4, 1823 – March 4, 1825	Democratic-Republican	2nd	Elected in 1823. Switched parties.
John McKee	March 4, 1825 – March 4, 1829	Jacksonian	2nd	Re-elected in 1825 as a Jacksonian. Retired.
John McKinley	March 4, 1833 – March 4, 1835	Jacksonian	2nd	Elected in 1833. Retired.
Barry Moore	January 3, 2021 – January 3, 2025	Republican	2nd	Elected in 2020. Redistricted to the 1st district.
Barry Moore	January 3, 2025 – present	Republican	1st	Elected in 2024. Incumbent. Retiring to run for U.S. senator.
Gabriel Moore	March 4, 1821 – March 4, 1823	Democratic-Republican	At-large	Elected in 1821. Redistricted to the 1st district.
Gabriel Moore	March 4, 1823 – March 4, 1825	Democratic-Republican	1st	Redistricted from the at-large district and re-elected in 1823. Switched parties.
Gabriel Moore	March 4, 1825 – March 4, 1829	Jacksonian	1st	Re-elected in 1825 as a Jacksonian. Retired.
Sydenham Moore	March 4, 1857 – January 21, 1861	Democratic	4th	Elected in 1857. Withdrew due to Civil War.
William O. Mulkey	June 29, 1914 – March 4, 1915	Democratic	3rd	Elected to finish Clayton's term. Retired.
John Murphy	March 4, 1833 – March 4, 1835	Jacksonian	5th	Elected in 1832. Retired.
John P. Newsome	January 3, 1943 – January 3, 1945	Democratic	9th	Elected in 1942. Lost renomination to Patrick.
William Flynt Nichols	January 3, 1967 – January 3, 1973	Democratic	4th	Elected in 1966. Redistricted to the 3rd district.
William Flynt Nichols	January 3, 1973 – December 25, 1988	Democratic	3rd	Redistricted from the 4th district and re-elected in 1972. Re-elected but died before next term began.
Benjamin White Norris	July 21, 1868 – March 4, 1869	Republican	3rd	Elected to finish the vacant term. Lost re-election to R. Heflin.
William C. Oates	March 4, 1881 – November 5, 1894	Democratic	3rd	Elected in 1880. Retired to run for governor and resigned when elected.
William Bacon Oliver	March 4, 1915 – January 3, 1937	Democratic	6th	Elected in 1914. Retired.
George Washington Owen	March 4, 1823 – March 4, 1825	Democratic-Republican	3rd	Elected in 1823. Switched parties.
George Washington Owen	March 4, 1825 – March 4, 1829	Jacksonian	3rd	Re-elected in 1825 as a Jacksonian. Retired.
Gary Palmer	January 3, 2015 – present	Republican	6th	Elected in 2014. Incumbent.
Luther Patrick	January 3, 1937 – January 3, 1943	Democratic	9th	Elected in 1936. Lost renomination to Newsome.
Luther Patrick	January 3, 1945 – January 3, 1947	Democratic	9th	Elected in 1944. Lost renomination to Battle.
LaFayette L. Patterson	November 6, 1928 – March 4, 1933	Democratic	5th	Elected to finish Bowling's term. Lost renomination to Allgood.
William W. Payne	March 4, 1841 – March 4, 1843	Democratic	At-large	Elected in 1841. Redistricted to the 4th district.
William W. Payne	March 4, 1843 – March 4, 1847	Democratic	4th	Redistricted from the at-large district and re-elected in 1843. Lost re-election to Inge.
Charles Pelham	March 4, 1873 – March 4, 1875	Republican	3rd	Elected in 1872. Retired.
Philip Phillips	March 4, 1853 – March 4, 1855	Democratic	1st	Elected in 1853. Retired.
Charles W. Pierce	July 21, 1868 – March 4, 1869	Republican	4th	Elected to finish the vacant term. Retired.
Thomas S. Plowman	March 4, 1897 – February 9, 1898	Democratic	4th	Elected in 1896. Lost contested election to Aldrich.
Luke Pryor	March 4, 1883 – March 4, 1885	Democratic	8th	Elected in 1882. Retired.
James L. Pugh	March 4, 1859 – January 21, 1861	Democratic	2nd	Elected in 1859. Withdrew due to Civil War.
Lilius B. Rainey	September 30, 1919 – March 4, 1923	Democratic	7th	Elected to finish Burnett's term. Retired.
Albert Rains	January 3, 1945 – January 3, 1963	Democratic	5th	Elected in 1944. Redistricted to the at-large district.
Albert Rains	January 3, 1963 – January 3, 1965	Democratic	At-large	Redistricted from the 5th district and re-elected in 1962. Retired.
James T. Rapier	March 4, 1873 – March 4, 1875	Republican	2nd	Elected in 1872. Lost re-election to J. Williams.
William N. Richardson	August 6, 1900 – March 31, 1914	Democratic	8th	Elected to finish Wheeler's term. Died.
Bob R. Riley	January 3, 1997 – January 3, 2003	Republican	3rd	Elected in 1996. Retired to run for governor.
Gaston A. Robbins	March 4, 1893 – March 13, 1896	Democratic	4th	Elected in 1892. Lost contested election to W. Aldrich.
Gaston A. Robbins	March 4, 1899 – March 8, 1900	Democratic	4th	Elected in 1898. Lost contested election to W. Aldrich.
Kenneth A. Roberts	January 3, 1951 – January 3, 1963	Democratic	4th	Elected in 1950. Redistricted to the at-large district.
Kenneth A. Roberts	January 3, 1963 – January 3, 1965	Democratic	At-large	Redistricted from the 4th district and re-elected in 1962. Redistricted to the 4th district and lost re-election to G. Andrews.
Martha Roby	January 3, 2011 – January 3, 2021	Republican	2nd	Elected in 2010. Retired.
Mike Rogers	January 3, 2003 – present	Republican	3rd	Elected in 2002. Incumbent.
Thomas W. Sadler	March 4, 1885 – March 4, 1887	Democratic	5th	Elected in 1884. Lost renomination to J. Cobb.
William J. Samford	March 4, 1879 – March 4, 1881	Democratic	3rd	Elected in 1878. Retired.
Armistead I. Selden Jr.	January 3, 1953 – January 3, 1963	Democratic	6th	Elected in 1952. Redistricted to the at-large district.
Armistead I. Selden Jr.	January 3, 1963 – January 3, 1965	Democratic	At-large	Redistricted from the 6th district and re-elected in 1962. Redistricted to the 5th district.
Armistead I. Selden Jr.	January 3, 1965 – January 3, 1969	Democratic	5th	Redistricted from the at-large district and re-elected in 1964. Retired to run for U.S. senator.
Terri Sewell	January 3, 2011 – present	Democratic	7th	Elected in 2010. Incumbent.
Charles C. Sheats	March 4, 1873 – March 4, 1875	Republican	At-large	Elected in 1872. Lost re-election to Forney.
Richard Shelby	January 3, 1979 – January 3, 1987	Democratic	7th	Elected in 1978. Retired to run for U.S. senator.
Charles M. Shelley	March 4, 1877 – July 20, 1882	Democratic	4th	Elected in 1876. Seat declared vacant when contested by James Q. Smith.
Charles M. Shelley	November 27, 1882 – January 9, 1885	Democratic	4th	Elected to finish the vacant term. Lost contested election to G. Craig.
William C. Sherrod	March 4, 1869 – March 4, 1871	Democratic	6th	Elected in 1869. Retired.
Benjamin Glover Shields	March 4, 1841 – March 4, 1843	Democratic	At-large	Elected in 1841. Retired.
Eli S. Shorter	March 4, 1855 – March 4, 1859	Democratic	2nd	Elected in 1855. Retired.
Joseph H. Sloss	March 4, 1871 – March 4, 1875	Democratic	6th	Elected in 1870. Lost re-election to Hewitt.
Albert L. Smith Jr.	January 3, 1981 – January 3, 1983	Republican	6th	Elected in 1980. Lost re-election to Erdreich.
William Russell Smith	March 4, 1851 – March 4, 1853	Union	4th	Elected in 1851. Switched parties.
William Russell Smith	March 4, 1853 – March 4, 1855	Democratic	4th	Re-elected in 1853 as a Democrat. Switched parties.
William Russell Smith	March 4, 1855 – March 4, 1857	Know Nothing	4th	Re-elected in 1855 as a Know Nothing candidate. Lost re-election to S. Moore.
John Sparkman	January 3, 1937 – November 5, 1946	Democratic	8th	Elected in 1936. Re-elected but resigned when elected U.S. Senator.
Jesse F. Stallings	March 4, 1893 – March 4, 1901	Democratic	2nd	Elected in 1892. Retired.
James A. Stallworth	March 4, 1857 – January 12, 1861	Democratic	1st	Elected in 1857. Withdrew due to Civil War.
Joe Starnes	January 3, 1935 – January 3, 1945	Democratic	5th	Elected in 1934. Lost renomination to Rains.
Henry B. Steagall	March 4, 1915 – November 22, 1943	Democratic	3rd	Elected in 1914. Died.
Dale Strong	January 3, 2023 – present	Republican	5th	Elected in 2022. Incumbent.
George W. Taylor	March 4, 1897 – March 4, 1915	Democratic	1st	Elected in 1896. Retired.
Charles Winston Thompson	March 4, 1901 – March 20, 1904	Democratic	5th	Elected in 1900. Died.
Benjamin Sterling Turner	March 4, 1871 – March 4, 1873	Republican	1st	Elected in 1870. Lost re-election to Bromberg.
Louis Washington Turpin	March 4, 1889 – June 4, 1890	Democratic	4th	Elected in 1888. Lost contested election to McDuffie.
Louis Washington Turpin	March 4, 1891 – March 4, 1893	Democratic	4th	Elected in 1890. Redistricted to the 9th district.
Louis Washington Turpin	March 4, 1893 – March 4, 1895	Democratic	9th	Elected in 1892. Lost renomination to Underwood.
John R. Tyson	March 4, 1921 – March 27, 1923	Democratic	2nd	Elected in 1920. Died.
Oscar Underwood	March 4, 1895 – June 9, 1896	Democratic	9th	Elected in 1894. Lost election contest to T. Aldrich.
Oscar Underwood	March 4, 1897 – March 4, 1915	Democratic	9th	Elected in 1896. Retired to run for U.S. Senator.
Percy Walker	March 4, 1855 – March 4, 1857	Know Nothing	1st	Elected in 1855. Retired.
Zadoc L. Weatherford	November 5, 1940 – January 3, 1941	Democratic	7th	Elected to finish William Bankhead's term. Retired.
Joseph Wheeler	March 4, 1881 – June 3, 1882	Democratic	8th	Elected in 1880. Lost election contest to Lowe.
Joseph Wheeler	January 15, 1883 – March 4, 1883	Democratic	8th	Elected to finish Lowe's term. Retired.
Joseph Wheeler	March 4, 1885 – April 20, 1900	Democratic	8th	Elected in 1884. Resigned.
Alexander White	March 4, 1851 – March 4, 1853	Whig	7th	Elected in 1851. Retired.
Alexander White	March 4, 1873 – March 4, 1875	Republican	At-large	Elected in 1872. Lost re-election to B. Lewis.
Ariosto A. Wiley	March 4, 1901 – June 17, 1908	Democratic	2nd	Elected in 1900. Died.
Oliver C. Wiley	November 3, 1908 – March 4, 1909	Democratic	2nd	Elected to finish his brother's term. Retired.
Jeremiah N. Williams	March 4, 1875 – March 4, 1877	Democratic	2nd	Elected in 1874. Redistricted to the 3rd district.
Jeremiah N. Williams	March 4, 1877 – March 4, 1879	Democratic	3rd	Redistricted from the 2nd district and re-elected in 1876. Retired.
Thomas Williams	March 4, 1879 – March 4, 1885	Democratic	5th	Elected in 1878. Retired.
William Lowndes Yancey	December 2, 1844 – September 1, 1846	Democratic	3rd	Elected to finish Lewis's term. Resigned.

== See also ==
- Alabama's congressional delegations
- Alabama's congressional districts
- List of United States senators from Alabama
