= Senator Pryor =

Senator Pryor may refer to:

- David Pryor (born 1934), U.S. Senator from Arkansas from 1979 to 1997
- Luke Pryor (1820–1900), U.S. Senator from Alabama in 1880
- Mark Pryor (born 1963), U.S. Senator from Arkansas from 2003 to 2015
