= Dixon H. Lewis =

Democratic U.S. Senator from Alabama

Dixon Hall Lewis
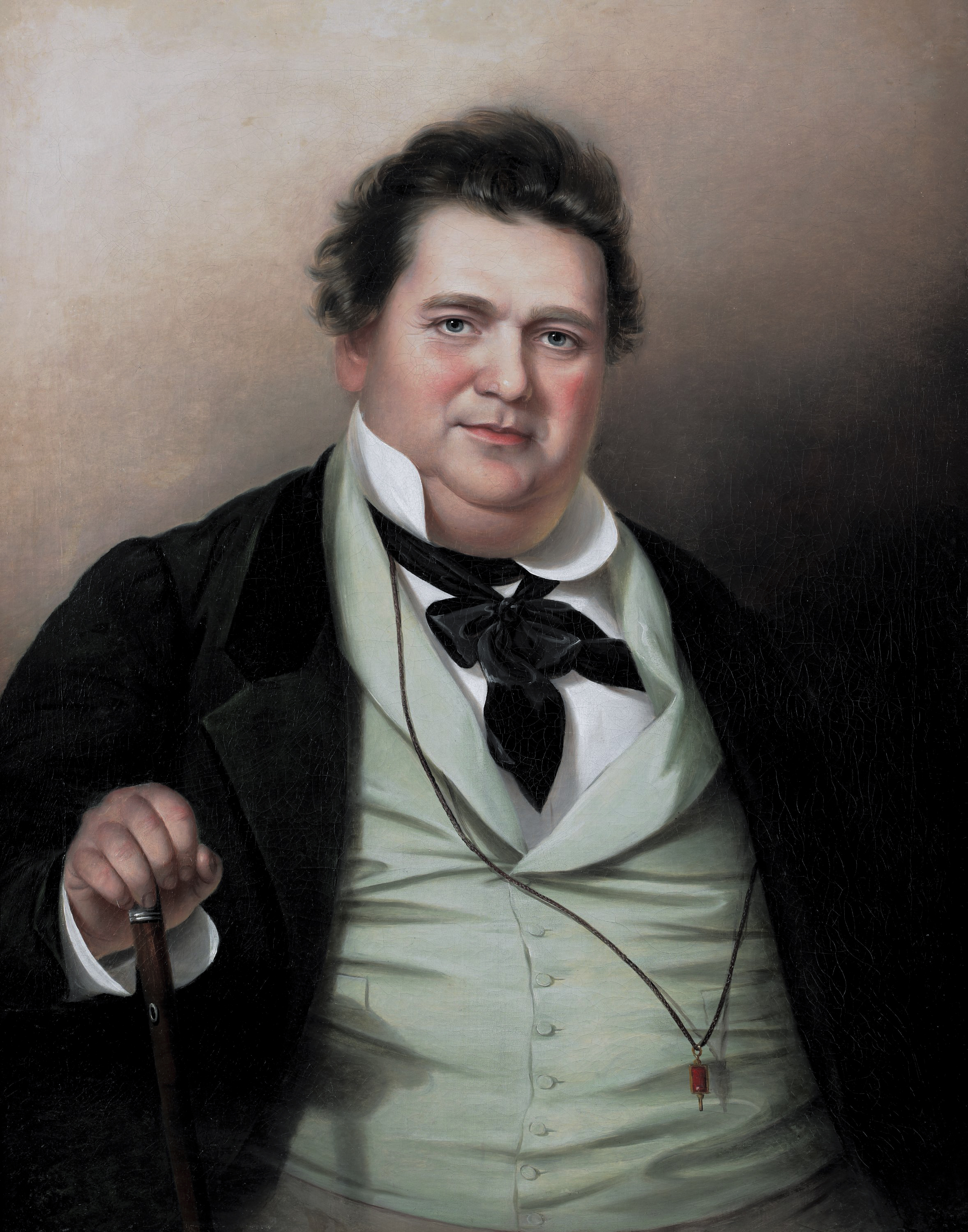

United States Senator from Alabama
- In office April 22, 1844 – October 25, 1848
- Preceded by: William R. King
- Succeeded by: Benjamin Fitzpatrick

Dean of the United States House of Representatives
- In office March 4, 1843 – April 22, 1844
- Preceded by: Lewis Williams
- Succeeded by: John Quincy Adams

Member of the U.S. House of Representatives from Alabama
- In office March 4, 1829 – April 22, 1844
- Preceded by: George Washington Owen
- Succeeded by: William Lowndes Yancey
- Constituency: 3rd district (1829–1833); 4th district (1833–1841) at-large district (1841–1843); 3rd district (1843–1844)

Member of the Alabama House of Representatives
- In office 1826–1828

Personal details
- Born: August 10, 1802 Dinwiddie County, Virginia, U.S.
- Died: October 25, 1848 (aged 46) New York City, New York, U.S.
- Party: Democratic, Nullifier
- Education: South Carolina College

Dixon Hall Lewis (August 10, 1802 – October 25, 1848) was an American politician who served as a representative and a senator from Alabama.

== Life and career ==
Lewis was born on Bothwick plantation, Dinwiddie County, Virginia, and moved to Hancock County, Georgia, with his parents in 1806. He graduated from Mount Zion Academy and from South Carolina College at Columbia in 1820. He moved to Autauga County, Alabama, the same year, where he studied law and was admitted to the bar in 1823. That same year he constructed a house ("Old Homestead") in the town of Lowndesboro, Alabama, twenty miles west of the state capitol in Montgomery. He began to practice law in Montgomery and was elected a member of the Alabama House of Representatives in 1826, serving until 1828. He was elected as a States Rights Democrat to the twenty-first and to the seven succeeding Congresses and served from March 4, 1829, to April 22, 1844, when he resigned the House to join the Senate. He served as chairman of the United States House Committee on Indian Affairs from 1831 to 1835. He was nearly elected Speaker of the House in the 26th Congress, receiving 113 votes on the 8th ballot, just four votes short of the necessary 117 needed to be elected. Robert M. T. Hunter was elected on the 11th ballot.

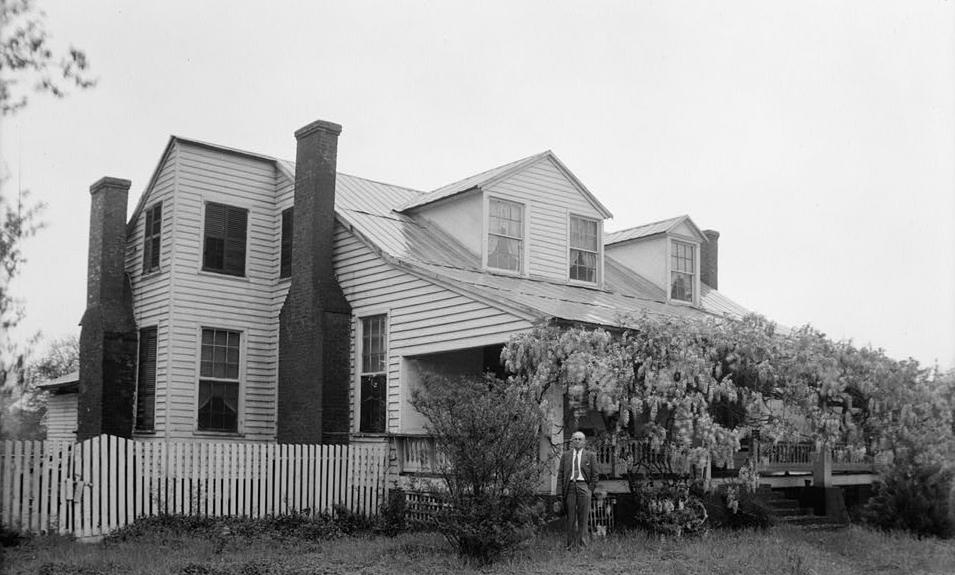
Dixon H. Lewis's house in Lowndesboro, Alabama, 1935

In 1844 Lewis was appointed by his brother-in-law Governor Benjamin Fitzpatrick to the United States Senate to fill the vacancy caused by the resignation of William R. King in 1844. He was reelected as the Democratic candidate in 1847 and served from April 22, 1844, until his death in New York City on October 25, 1848. In the Senate he served as chairman of the Finance Committee from 1845 to 1847. He was appointed to the Board of Visitors of West Point in 1847. Also in 1847 he bought at Baltimore "fifteen or twenty thousand dollars worth of Negroes for use of himself and his son, on their plantations, at home."

A strikingly obese figure, Lewis was known to weigh as much as 500 pounds (227 kg), making him the heaviest member of Congress ever. A specially-constructed seat was provided in the Senate chambers for him, and his carriage was fitted with unusually heavy suspension springs. According to the WPA Federal Writers' Project publication Alabama: A Guide to the Deep South, a popular witticism among Lewis's colleagues was the observation that Alabama had the largest representation of any state.

Lewis is interred at Green-Wood Cemetery in Brooklyn, New York.

== See also ==
- List of members of the United States Congress who died in office (1790–1899)

U.S. House of Representatives
| Preceded by George Washington Owen | Member of the U.S. House of Representatives from Alabama's 3rd congressional district March 4, 1829 – March 3, 1833 | Succeeded by Samuel Wright Mardis |
| Preceded by (none) | Member of the U.S. House of Representatives from Alabama's 4th congressional district March 4, 1833 – March 3, 1841 | Succeeded by William Winter Payne |
| Preceded by (none) | Member of the U.S. House of Representatives from Alabama's at-large congressional district March 4, 1841 – March 3, 1843 | Succeeded by (none) |
| Preceded by George Whitfield Crabb | Member of the U.S. House of Representatives from Alabama's 3rd congressional district March 4, 1843 – April 22, 1844 | Succeeded by William Lowndes Yancey |
U.S. Senate
| Preceded by William R. King | U.S. senator (Class 2) from Alabama; April 22, 1844 – October 25, 1848; Served alongside: Arthur P. Bagby and William R. King | Succeeded by Benjamin Fitzpatrick |
Political offices
| Preceded by John C. Calhoun; South Carolina | Chairman of the U.S. Senate Committee on Finance; 1846–1847 | Succeeded by Charles Atherton; New Hampshire |
