= William H. F. Payne =

Confederate general, American lawyer and politician

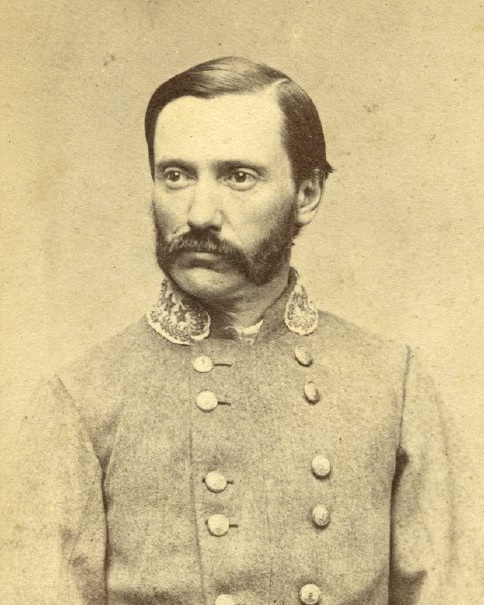

Member of the Virginia House of Delegates for Loudoun and Fauquier
- In office December 3, 1879 – December 7, 1881
- Succeeded by: R. Taylor Scott

Personal details
- Born: January 27, 1830 Fauquier, Virginia, U.S.
- Died: March 29, 1904 (aged 74) Washington, D.C., U.S.
- Spouse: Mary Elizabeth Winston Payne (m. 1852)
- Children: 10
- Relatives: William Winter Payne (half-cousin; father-in-law)
- Education: Virginia Military Institute; University of Virginia
- Occupation: Lawyer; politician

Military service
- Allegiance: Confederate States
- Branch/service: Confederate States Army
- Years of service: 1861–1865
- Rank: Brigadier general
- Battles/wars: American Civil War

William Henry Fitzhugh Payne (January 27, 1830 – March 29, 1904) was a Confederate brigadier general during the American Civil War.

== Early life ==
William Payne was born in Fauquier County, Virginia to Arthur Alexander Morson Payne and Mary Conway Mason Fitzhugh. He attended the Virginia Military Institute in 1846-47, but left school after only one year. He was declared an honorary graduate by the Board of Visitors in 1873.

Payne studied law at the University of Virginia and established a law practice in Warrenton, Virginia in 1851. The following year, he married his cousin, Mary Elizabeth Winston Payne, a daughter of William Winter Payne; the couple would have ten children. He served as the Commonwealth's Attorney for Fauquier County for several years.

== Civil War ==
Payne enrolled in early 1861 as a private and participated in the occupation of Harpers Ferry in April. Later in the year, he became a captain in the famed Black Horse Cavalry, serving as under J.E.B. Stuart. He was promoted to major of the 4th Virginia Cavalry and commanded the regiment at the Battle of Williamsburg during the Peninsula Campaign. He was severely wounded and captured by Union forces.

After being exchanged, he returned to duty as the lieutenant colonel of the 2nd North Carolina Cavalry and fought in the Chancellorsville Campaign. During the subsequent Gettysburg campaign, he was captured at the Battle of Hanover in 1863 after being dehorsed and falling into an open vat of tanning liquid.

After being imprisoned at Johnson's Island, Ohio, he was promoted to brigadier general in November 1864 and led a brigade in Early's Valley Campaigns of 1864, where he fought in the battles of Opequon, Fisher's Hill, and Cedar Creek. He was badly wounded at the Battle of Five Forks. During the final operations in early 1865 around Richmond, he commanded a cavalry brigade under Fitzhugh Lee.

== Postbellum ==
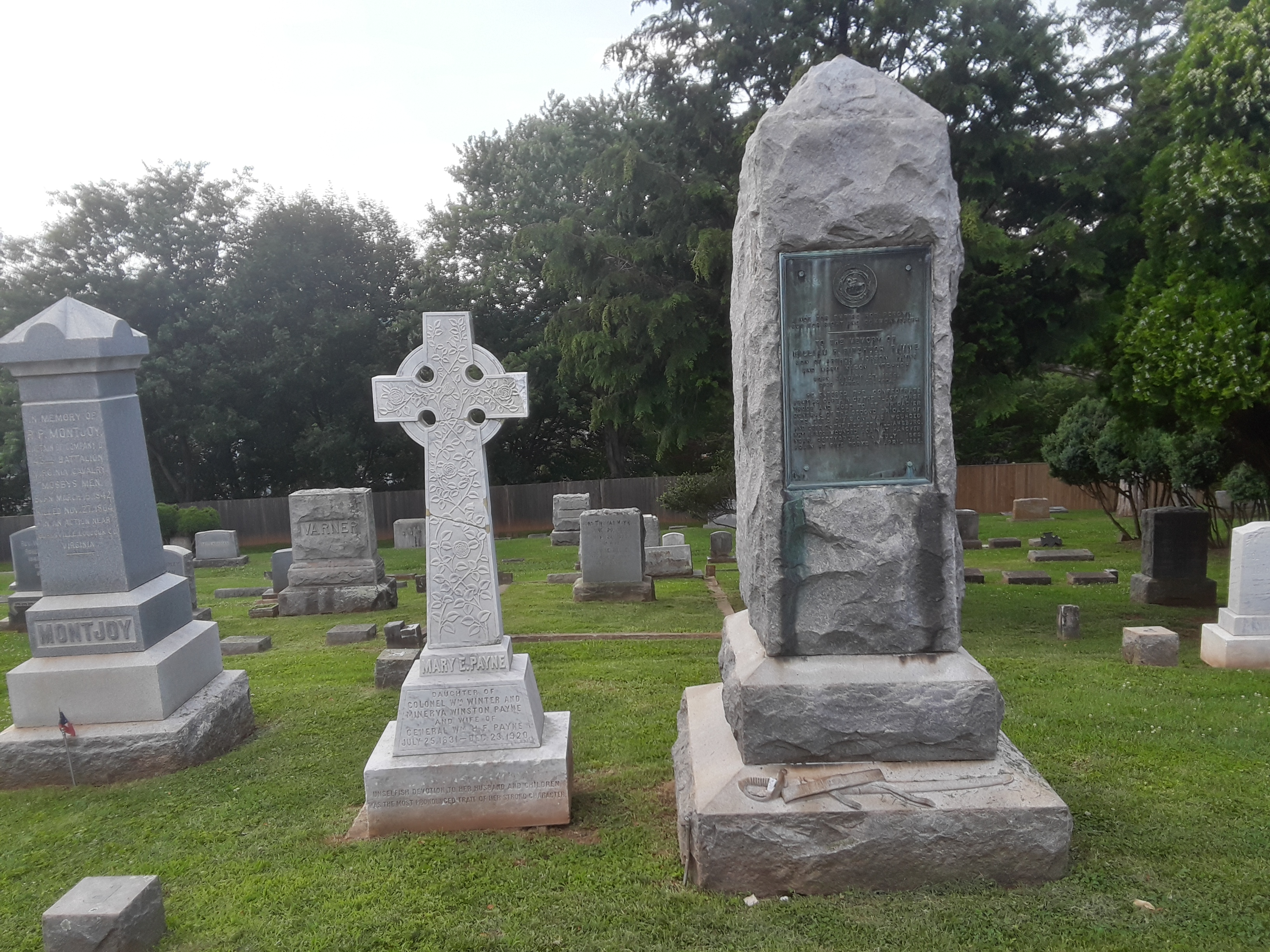
Graves of William H. F. and Mary E. Payne in the Warrenton Cemetery

After the war, Payne returned to his Virginia law practice. He was the general counsel for the Southern Railway Company. Payne served in the legislature of Virginia in the session of 1879–80.

He died in Washington, D.C.

== See also ==
- List of American Civil War generals (Confederate)
