= Joab Lawler =

American politician (1796–1838)

Member of the U.S. House of Representatives from Alabama's 3rd district
- In office March 4, 1835 – May 8, 1838
- Preceded by: Samuel W. Mardis
- Succeeded by: George W. Crabb

Member of the Alabama Senate
- In office 1831-1832

Member of the Alabama House of Representatives
- In office 1826-1831

Personal details
- Born: Joab Lawler; June 12, 1796 Union County, North Carolina, U.S.
- Died: May 8, 1838 (aged 41) Washington, D.C., U.S.
- Party: Jacksonian

Joab Lawler (June 12, 1796 – May 8, 1838) was a U.S. representative from Alabama. He also served in the Alabama House of Representatives and Alabama Senate.

Born in Union County, North Carolina, Lawler moved with his father to Tennessee and in 1815 to Mississippi Territory. He attended public schools. He studied theology and was licensed to preach.

In 1820, he moved to Mardisville, Alabama and pursued his ministerial duties. He served as member of the State House of Representatives 1826-1831. He served in the State Senate 1831 and 1832. He was the Receiver of Public Moneys for the Coosa land district 1832-1835 and served as treasurer of the University of Alabama at Tuscaloosa 1833-1836.

Lawler was elected as a Jacksonian to the Twenty-fourth Congress. He was re-elected as a Whig to the Twenty-fifth Congress and served from March 4, 1835, until his death in Washington, D.C., on May 8, 1838. He was interred in the Congressional Cemetery.

== See also ==
- List of members of the United States Congress who died in office (1790–1899)

U.S. House of Representatives
Preceded by Samuel W. Mardis	Member of the U.S. House of Representatives from Alabama's 3rd congressional district March 4, 1835 - May 8, 1838	Succeeded by George W. Crabb
