= Samuel W. Mardis =

American politician (1800–1836)

Samuel Wright Mardis

Member of the U.S. House of Representatives from Alabama
- In office March 4, 1831 – March 3, 1835
- Preceded by: R. E. B. Baylor (2nd); Dixon H. Lewis (3rd)
- Succeeded by: John McKinley (2nd); Joab Lawler (3rd)
- Constituency: 2nd district (1831-33); 3rd district (1833–35)

Personal details
- Born: June 12, 1800 Fayetteville, Tennessee, U.S.
- Died: November 14, 1836 (aged 36) Talladega, Alabama, U.S
- Party: Jacksonian

Samuel Wright Mardis (June 12, 1800 – November 14, 1836) was an American politician and a member of the United States House of Representatives from Alabama. He was born on June 12, 1800, in Fayetteville, Tennessee. He received academic training, attended an "old field school", and studied law. He was admitted to the bar, and he commenced practice in Montevallo, Alabama in 1823. From 1823 to 1825, in 1828, and in 1830, he was a member of the Alabama House of Representatives.

He was elected as a Jacksonian to the Twenty-second and Twenty-third Congresses. He served from March 4, 1831, to March 3, 1835. In 1835, he moved to Mardisville, Alabama in Talladega County and continued the practice of law. He died in Talladega, Alabama on November 14, 1836. He was interred in Oak Hill Cemetery.

== Notes ==
U.S. House of Representatives
Preceded by Robert E. B. Baylor	Member of the U.S. House of Representatives from Alabama's 2nd congressional district March 4, 1831 – March 3, 1833	Succeeded by John McKinley
Preceded by Dixon Hall Lewis	Member of the U.S. House of Representatives from Alabama's 3rd congressional district March 4, 1833 – March 3, 1835	Succeeded by Joab Lawler
