= William R. King =

Vice President of the United States in 1853

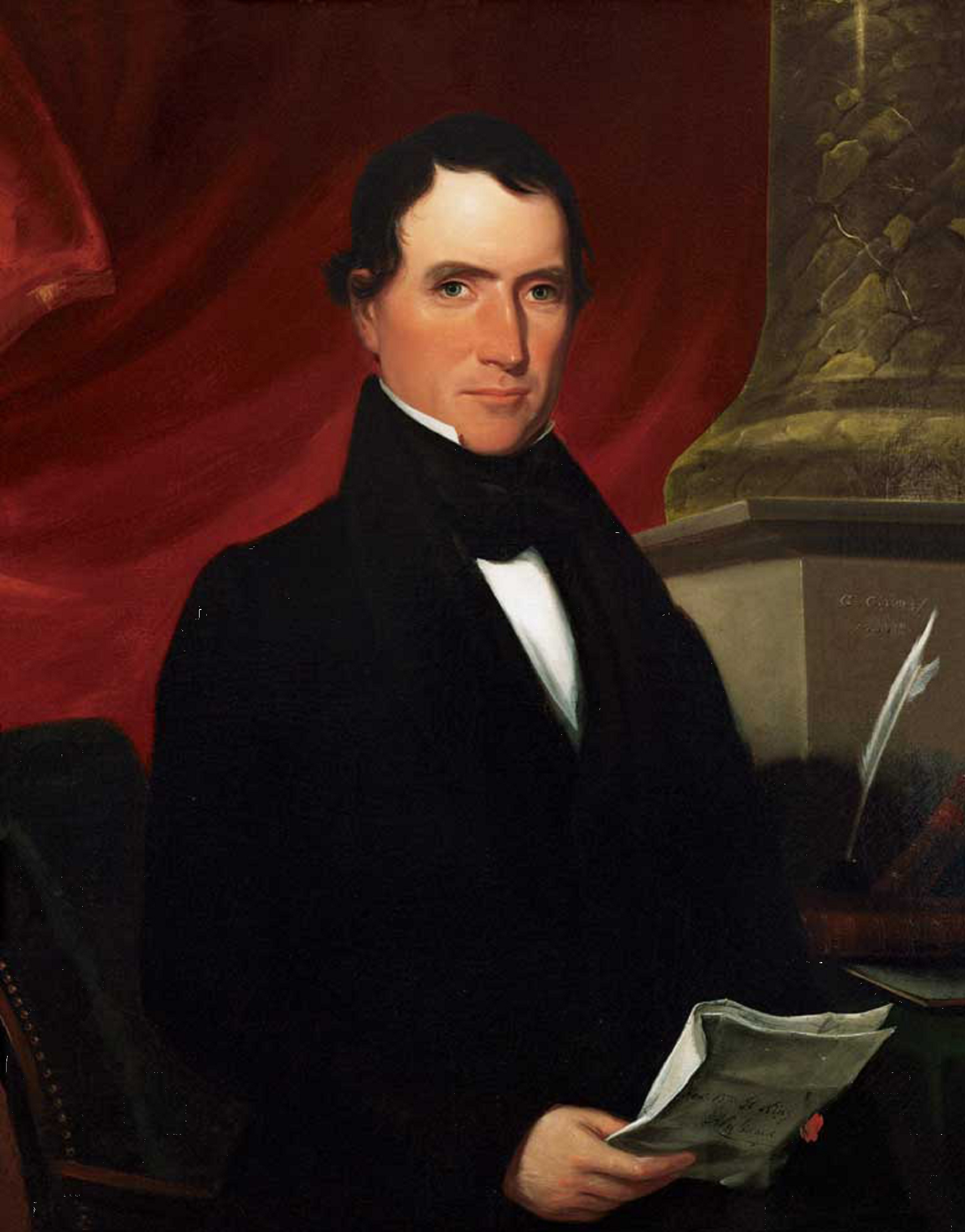
- Portrait by George Cooke, c. 1839

13th Vice President of the United States
- In office March 4, 1853 (Note: King was inaugurated—near Matanzas, in the Spanish colony of Cuba—twenty days after his term began (March 4) due to poor health. He was the first and only vice president of the United States to be sworn in on foreign soil.) – April 18, 1853
- President: Franklin Pierce
- Preceded by: Millard Fillmore
- Succeeded by: John C. Breckinridge

United States Senator from Alabama
- In office July 1, 1848 – December 20, 1852
- Preceded by: Arthur P. Bagby
- Succeeded by: Benjamin Fitzpatrick
- In office December 14, 1819 – April 15, 1844
- Preceded by: Seat established
- Succeeded by: Dixon Hall Lewis

President pro tempore of the United States Senate
- In office May 6, 1850 – December 20, 1852
- Preceded by: David Rice Atchison
- Succeeded by: David Rice Atchison
- In office July 1, 1836 – March 3, 1841
- Preceded by: John Tyler
- Succeeded by: Samuel L. Southard

16th United States Minister to France
- In office April 9, 1844 – September 15, 1846
- President: John Tyler; James K. Polk
- Preceded by: Lewis Cass
- Succeeded by: Richard Rush

Member of the U.S. House of Representatives from North Carolina's 5th district
- In office March 4, 1811 – November 4, 1816
- Preceded by: Thomas Kenan
- Succeeded by: Charles Hooks

Member of the North Carolina House of Commons
- In office 1807–1809

Personal details
- Born: William Rufus DeVane King; April 7, 1786 Sampson County, North Carolina, U.S.
- Died: April 18, 1853 (aged 67) Selma, Alabama, U.S.
- Resting place: Old Live Oak Cemetery
- Party: Democratic-Republican (before 1828); Democratic (1828–1853)
- Education: University of North Carolina, Chapel Hill (BA)

William Rufus DeVane King (April 7, 1786 – April 18, 1853) was an American politician and diplomat who served as the 13th vice president of the United States from March 4, 1853, until his death. He previously served as a U.S. representative from North Carolina, a U.S. senator from Alabama, and minister to France.

A Democratic-Republican and later a Democrat, King was a leading political figure in early Alabama and was elected as one of the state's first U.S. senators after its admission to the Union in 1819. He aligned politically with Andrew Jackson and served multiple terms in the Senate, including as president pro tempore. During the sectional disputes preceding the American Civil War, he supported slavery and opposed abolitionist efforts in the territories, while also opposing secession.

King was elected vice president in 1852 on the ticket headed by Franklin Pierce. Because he was ill with tuberculosis, Congress permitted him to take the oath of office in Cuba, making him the only U.S. vice president to be sworn in on foreign soil. He died 45 days later, without carrying out any duties of the office. Historians have also written about his close relationship with James Buchanan.

== Early life ==
King was born on April 7, 1786, in Sampson County, North Carolina, the son of William King and Margaret DeVane. He graduated from the University of North Carolina at Chapel Hill in 1803, where he was a member of the Philanthropic Society. After reading law with Judge William Duffy of Fayetteville, North Carolina, he was admitted to the bar in 1805 or 1806 and began practicing law in Clinton. King was also a Freemason.

== Political career ==
King entered politics as an elected member of the North Carolina House of Commons, serving from 1807 to 1809, and later became city solicitor of Wilmington, North Carolina, in 1810. He was elected to the Twelfth, Thirteenth, and Fourteenth Congresses, serving from March 4, 1811, until November 4, 1816, when he resigned to become Secretary of the Legation for William Pinkney. He served in this role during Pinkney's appointment as Minister to Russia and during a diplomatic mission in Naples. King was 24 years old when he was first elected to Congress. He had not reached the constitutional age of 25 when his term began, but the Twelfth Congress did not convene until November 4, 1811, at which point he was sworn in to the House of Representatives.

When he returned to the United States in 1818, King joined the westward expansion of cotton cultivation into the Deep South, purchasing property at what would later be known as "King's Bend" between present-day Selma and Cahaba on the Alabama River in Dallas County. The area was part of the newly formed Alabama Territory, which had been recently separated from Mississippi. He developed a large cotton plantation based on slave labor and named it "Chestnut Hill." King and his relatives formed one of the state's largest slaveholding families, collectively owning as many as 500 people.

King was a delegate to the convention that organized the Alabama state government. After Alabama was admitted as the 22nd state in 1819, he was elected by the State Legislature as a Democratic-Republican to the United States Senate.

King aligned politically with Andrew Jackson, and was re-elected to the Senate as a Jacksonian in 1822, 1828, 1834, and 1841, serving from December 14, 1819, until his resignation on April 15, 1844. During the period from March to April 1824, King received a single vote at the Democratic-Republican Party caucus to be the party's candidate for the office of vice president of the United States in the upcoming 1824 presidential election. He served as President pro tempore of the United States Senate during the 24th through 27th Congresses. King was Chairman of the Senate Committee on Public Lands and the Committee on Commerce.

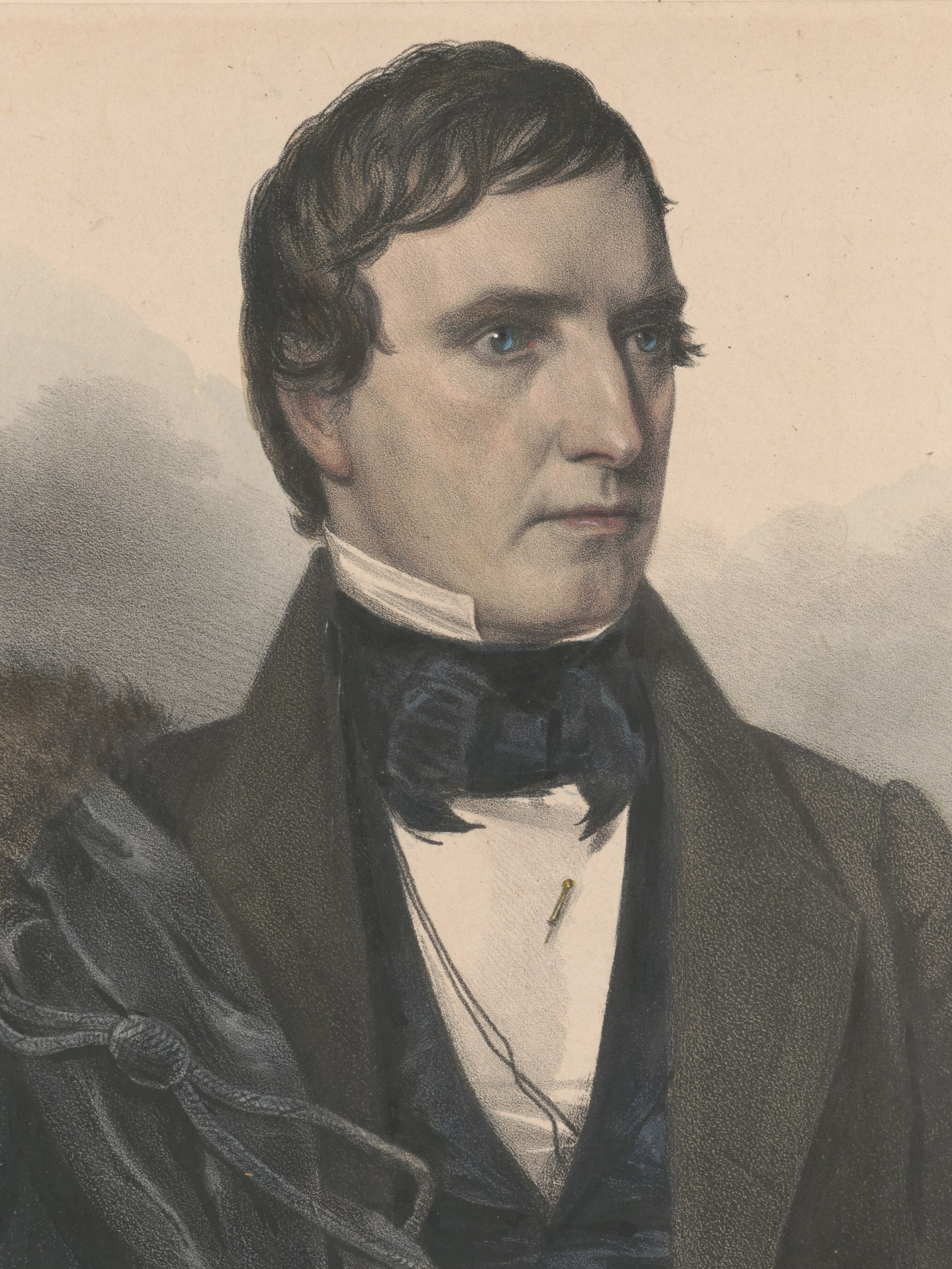
Lithograph of King, c. 1840

King was appointed Minister to France, serving from 1844 to 1846. After his return, he resumed Senate service, first by appointment and then by election to fill the vacancy caused by the resignation of Arthur P. Bagby. He held his seat from July 1, 1848, until his resignation on December 20, 1852, due to ill health and his election as vice president of the United States.

During the debates leading up to the Compromise of 1850, King supported the Senate gag rule against debate on antislavery petitions and opposed proposals to abolish slavery in the District of Columbia, which Congress administered. King supported slavery, arguing that the Constitution protected the institution of slavery in both the Southern states and the federal territories. He opposed both abolitionist efforts to abolish slavery in the territories and Fire-Eater calls for Southern secession.

On July 11, 1850, two days after President Zachary Taylor died, King was appointed Senate President pro tempore. When Millard Fillmore became president, the vice presidency was vacant, making King first in the line of succession under the law in effect. He also served as Chairman of the Senate Committee on Foreign Relations.

== Relationship with James Buchanan ==
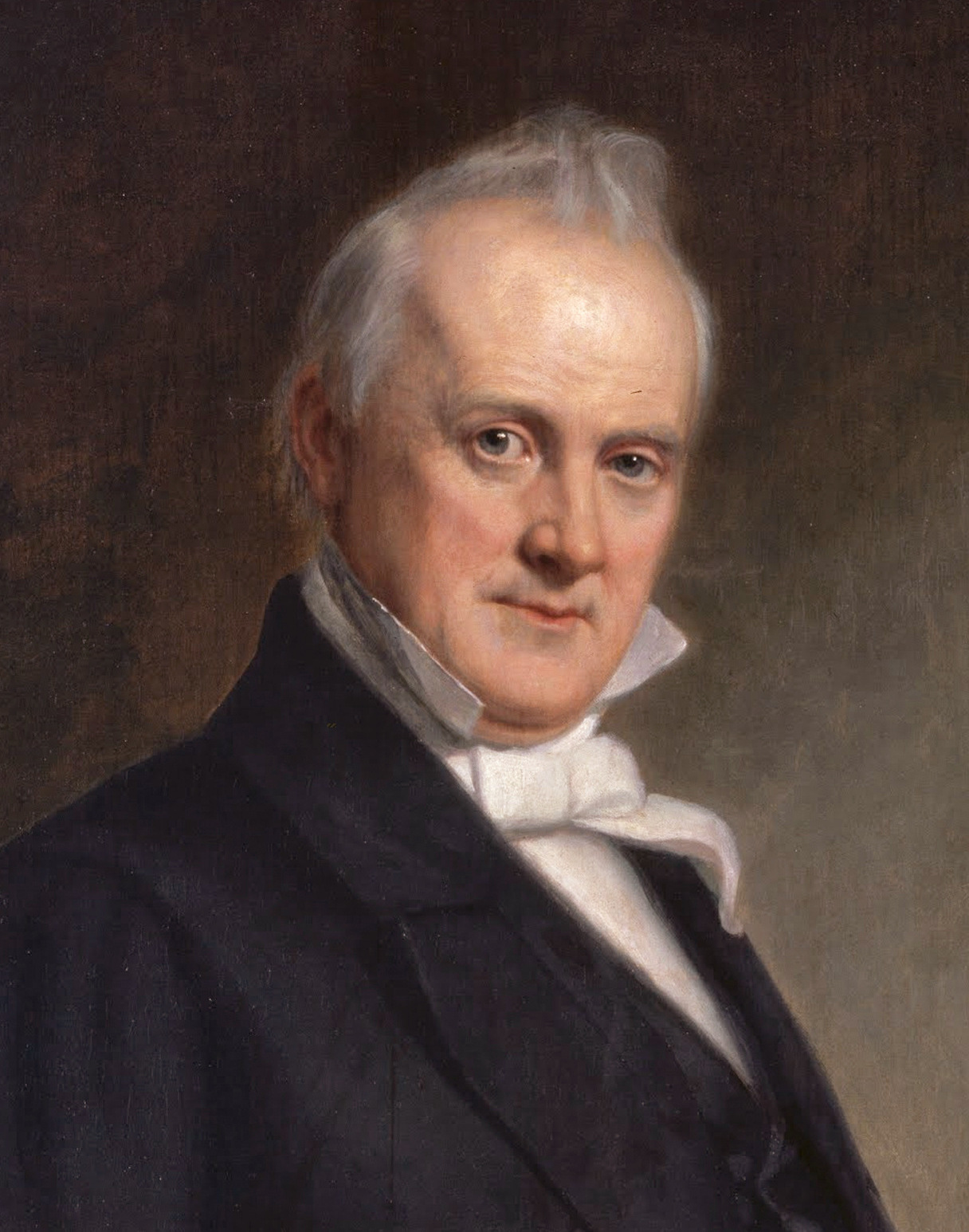
James Buchanan, 15th president of the United States (served 1857–1861). He shared a Washington boardinghouse with his friend and colleague, William R. King.

Some historians and biographers, including Jean H. Baker, have argued that King may have been homosexual or that his relationship with James Buchanan was romantic. The claim has also been supported by Shelley Ross, James W. Loewen, and Robert P. Watson. Other historians, such as Thomas J. Balcerski, author of Bosom Friends: The Intimate World of James Buchanan & William Rufus King, argue that King harbored unrequited feelings for Buchanan. The argument centers on his close relationship with President James Buchanan. Buchanan and King lived together in a Washington boardinghouse and attended social functions together from 1834 to 1844. Buchanan referred to the relationship as a "communion." The two often attended official functions. Contemporaries noted the closeness of their relationship. Andrew Jackson mockingly called them "Miss Nancy" and "Aunt Fancy" (the former being a 19th-century euphemism for an effeminate man), while Representative Aaron V. Brown referred to King as Buchanan's "better half."

However, historian Lewis Saum argued that customs and expressions in the mid-19th century differed from those of the present, and that "Miss Nancy" was "a fairly common designation for people who wore clean clothes and had good manners." He also noted that Brown was a political rival of King. Loewen described Buchanan and King as "Siamese twins".

Sol Barzman, a biographer of vice presidents, wrote that King's "fastidious habits and conspicuous intimacy with the bachelor Buchanan gave rise to some cruel jibes." Buchanan adopted King's mannerisms and romanticized southern culture. Both had strong political ambitions, and in 1844, they planned to run together for president and vice president. They spent some time apart while King was on overseas missions in France, and their letters remain cryptic and do not reveal any personal feelings.

In May 1844, Buchanan wrote to Cornelia Roosevelt:

I am now 'solitary and alone', having no companion in the house with me. I have gone a wooing to several gentlemen, but have not succeeded with any one of them. I feel that it is not good for man to be alone, and [I] should not be astonished to find myself married to some old maid who can nurse me when I am sick, provide good dinners for me when I am well, and not expect from me any very ardent or romantic affection.

After King died on April 18, 1853, at age 67, Buchanan described him as "among the best, the purest, and most consistent public men I have known".

Baker concluded that, while some of their correspondence was destroyed by family members, the length and intimacy of the surviving letters illustrate "the affection of a special friendship" between King and Buchanan, with no way to determine whether it was a romantic relationship.

== Vice presidency and death (1853) ==
The 1852 Democratic National Convention was held at the Maryland Institute for the Promotion of the Mechanic Arts in Baltimore. Franklin Pierce was nominated for president, and King was nominated for vice president.

Pierce and King defeated the Whig candidates, Winfield Scott and William Alexander Graham. Because King was ill with tuberculosis and had traveled to Cuba to recover, he was unable to be in Washington to take the oath of office on March 4, 1853. By a special act of Congress passed on March 2, he was allowed to take the oath outside the United States and was sworn in on March 24, 1853, near Matanzas, by the U.S. consul to Cuba, William L. Sharkey. King was the first and, to date, only vice president or president of the United States to take the oath of office on foreign soil.

Shortly afterward, King returned to Chestnut Hill. He died of tuberculosis on April 18, 1853, two days after his arrival, at age 67. He was interred in a vault on the plantation and later reburied in Old Live Oak Cemetery in Selma. King never carried out any duties of the office.

Following King's death, the office of vice president was vacant until John C. Breckinridge was inaugurated with President James Buchanan in March 1857.

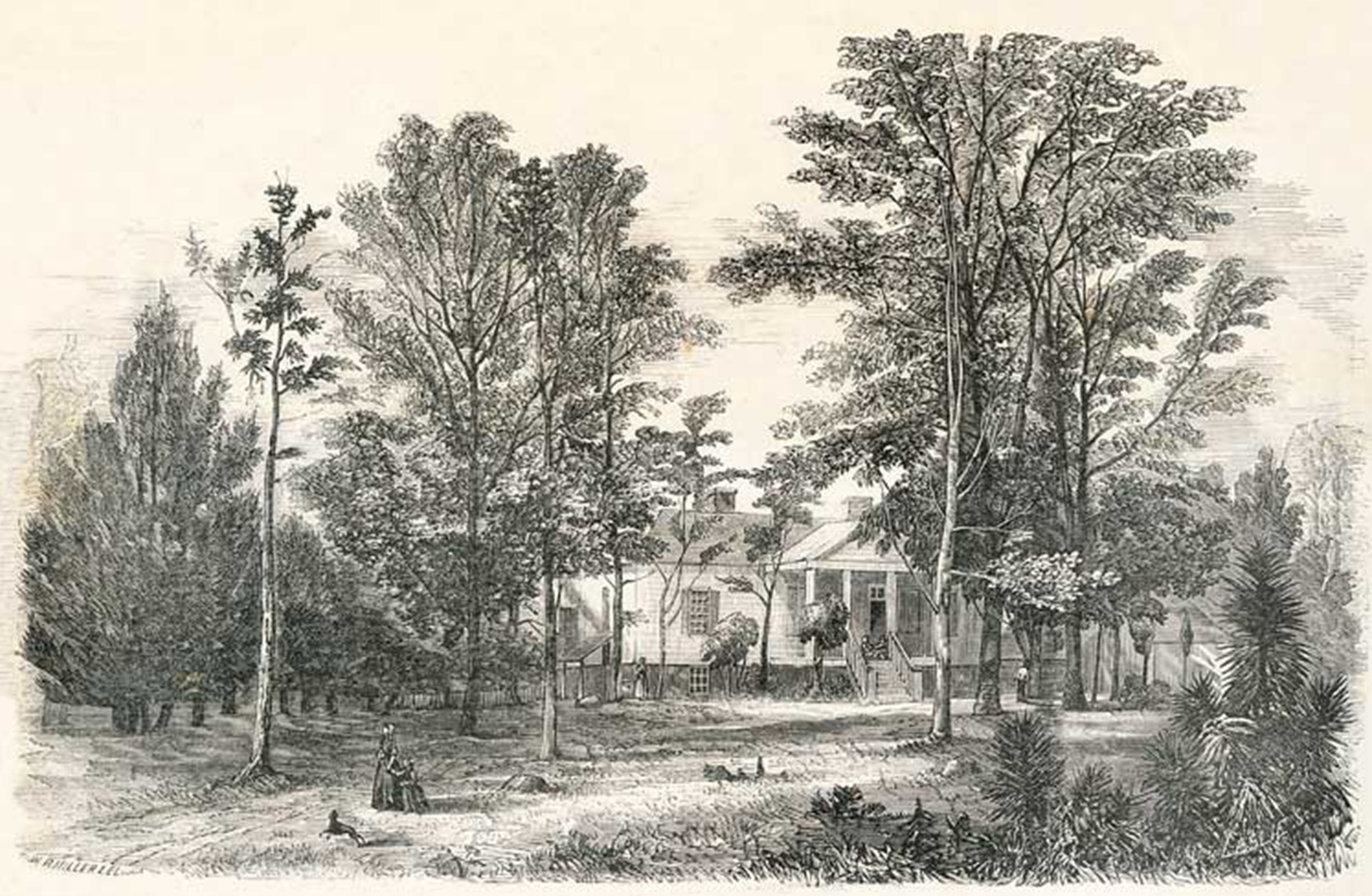
Engraving of Chestnut Hill, published in the Illustrated News (New York) on April 30, 1853, following King's death. The house was destroyed by fire during the 1920s.

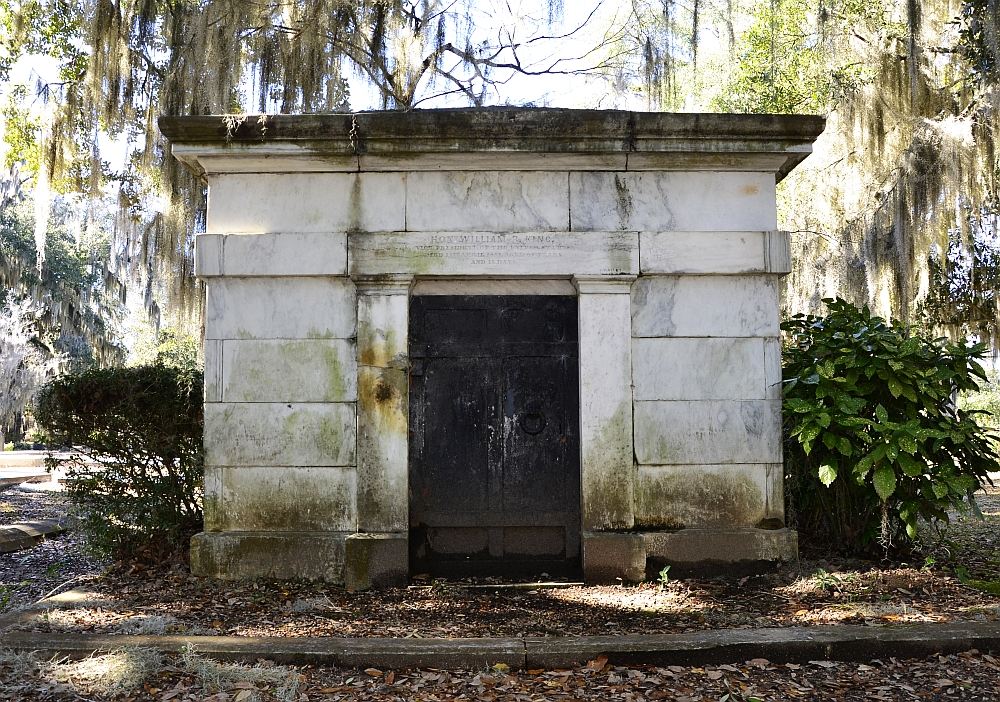
Crypt of William R. King in Live Oak Cemetery, Selma, Alabama.

== Legacy and honors ==
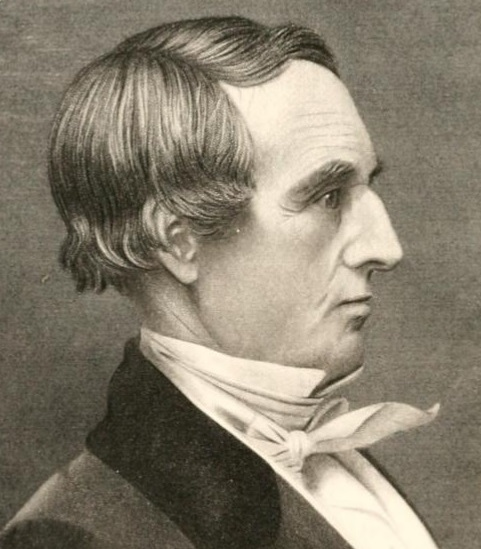
Frontispiece of book of memorial addresses published after King's death

In 1852, the Oregon Territorial Legislature named King County for him. The county became part of Washington Territory the following year and later part of the state of Washington in 1889. In 1985, the King County government amended its designation and logo to honor civil rights leader Martin Luther King Jr. The change became official on April 19, 2005, when Governor Christine Gregoire signed into law Senate Bill 5332, effective July 24, 2005.

The King Residence Quadrangle at his alma mater, University of North Carolina at Chapel Hill, is named for him.

An 1830 portrait of King is held in New East Hall in the Philanthropic Chambers of the Dialectic and Philanthropic Societies, a debating society which he had joined during college.

King was a co-founder of Selma, Alabama, which he named after the Ossianic poem The Songs of Selma. After his death, city officials and some of King's family wanted to move his body to Selma. Other family members preferred that his body remain at Chestnut Hill. In 1882, the Selma City Council appointed a committee to select a new plot for King's body. His remains were reinterred in the city's Live Oak Cemetery under a white marble mausoleum erected by the city.

== Notes ==
U.S. House of Representatives
| Preceded by Thomas Kenan | Member of the U.S. House of Representatives from North Carolina's 5th congressional district 1811–1816 | Succeeded by Charles Hooks |
U.S. Senate
| New seat | U.S. Senator (Class 2) from Alabama; 1819–1844; Served alongside: John Williams Walker, William Kelly, Henry H. Chambers, Israel Pickens, John McKinley, Gabriel Moore, Clement Clay, Arthur P. Bagby | Succeeded by Dixon Lewis |
| Preceded by Arthur P. Bagby | U.S. Senator (Class 3) from Alabama; 1848–1852; Served alongside: Dixon Lewis, Benjamin Fitzpatrick, Jeremiah Clemens | Succeeded by Benjamin Fitzpatrick |
Diplomatic posts
| Preceded by Lewis Cass | United States Minister to France; 1844–1846 | Succeeded by Richard Rush |
Political offices
| Preceded by John Tyler | President pro tempore of the United States Senate; 1836–1841 | Succeeded by Samuel L. Southard |
| Preceded by David Rice Atchison | President pro tempore of the United States Senate; 1850–1852 | Succeeded by David Rice Atchison |
| Preceded by Millard Fillmore | Vice President of the United States; 1853 | Succeeded by John C. Breckinridge |
Party political offices
| Preceded by William Orlando Butler | Democratic nominee for Vice President of the United States; 1852 | Succeeded by John C. Breckinridge |
