= Samuel Williams Inge =

American politician

United States Attorney for the Northern District of California
- In office 1853–1856
- President: Franklin Pierce
- Preceded by: Calhoun Benham
- Succeeded by: William Blanding

Member of the U.S. House of Representatives from Alabama's 4th district
- In office March 4, 1847 – March 3, 1851
- Preceded by: William Winter Payne
- Succeeded by: William R. Smith

Member of the Alabama House of Representatives from Sumter County
- In office December 2, 1844 – December 1, 1845 Serving with William Woodward & William J. Patton
- Preceded by: John C. Whitsett
- Succeeded by: Sidney S. Perry

Personal details
- Born: Samuel Williams Inge; February 22, 1817 Warren County, North Carolina, U.S.
- Died: June 10, 1868 (aged 51) San Francisco, California, U.S.
- Party: Democratic

Samuel Williams Inge (February 22, 1817 – June 10, 1868) was an American politician and a member of the United States House of Representatives from Alabama.

== Early life ==
Samuel Williams Inge was born on February 22, 1817, in Warren County, North Carolina. He moved to Greene County, Alabama, attended the public schools, and studied law. He was admitted to the bar.

== Career ==
Inge commenced practice in Livingston, Alabama in Sumter County, Alabama.

He was a member of the Alabama House of Representatives in 1844 and 1845. He was elected as a Democrat to the Thirtieth and Thirty-first Congresses. He served from March 4, 1847 to March 3, 1851. During the Thirty-first Congress, he was chairman of the United States House Committee on the District of Columbia. He participated in a duel with Edward Stanly, a Representative from North Carolina, in Bladensburg near Washington, D.C., but neither was seriously injured.

He resumed the practice of law and was appointed by President Franklin Pierce as a United States attorney for the northern district of California on April 1, 1853. Samuel Williams Inge led the California delegation to the 1856 National Democratic Convention in Cincinnati, casting all of California's votes for James Buchanan to be President and for the Democratic party to endorse the establishment of a safe and speedy communication throughout California between the East and West Coasts.

== Death ==
Inge died in San Francisco, California on June 10, 1868. He was originally interred at Calvary Cemetery before being moved to Holy Cross Cemetery in Colma, California.

U.S. House of Representatives
Preceded by District inactive	Member of the U.S. House of Representatives from Alabama's 4th congressional district March 4, 1847 – March 3, 1851	Succeeded by William Russell Smith
