= William Winter Payne =

American politician

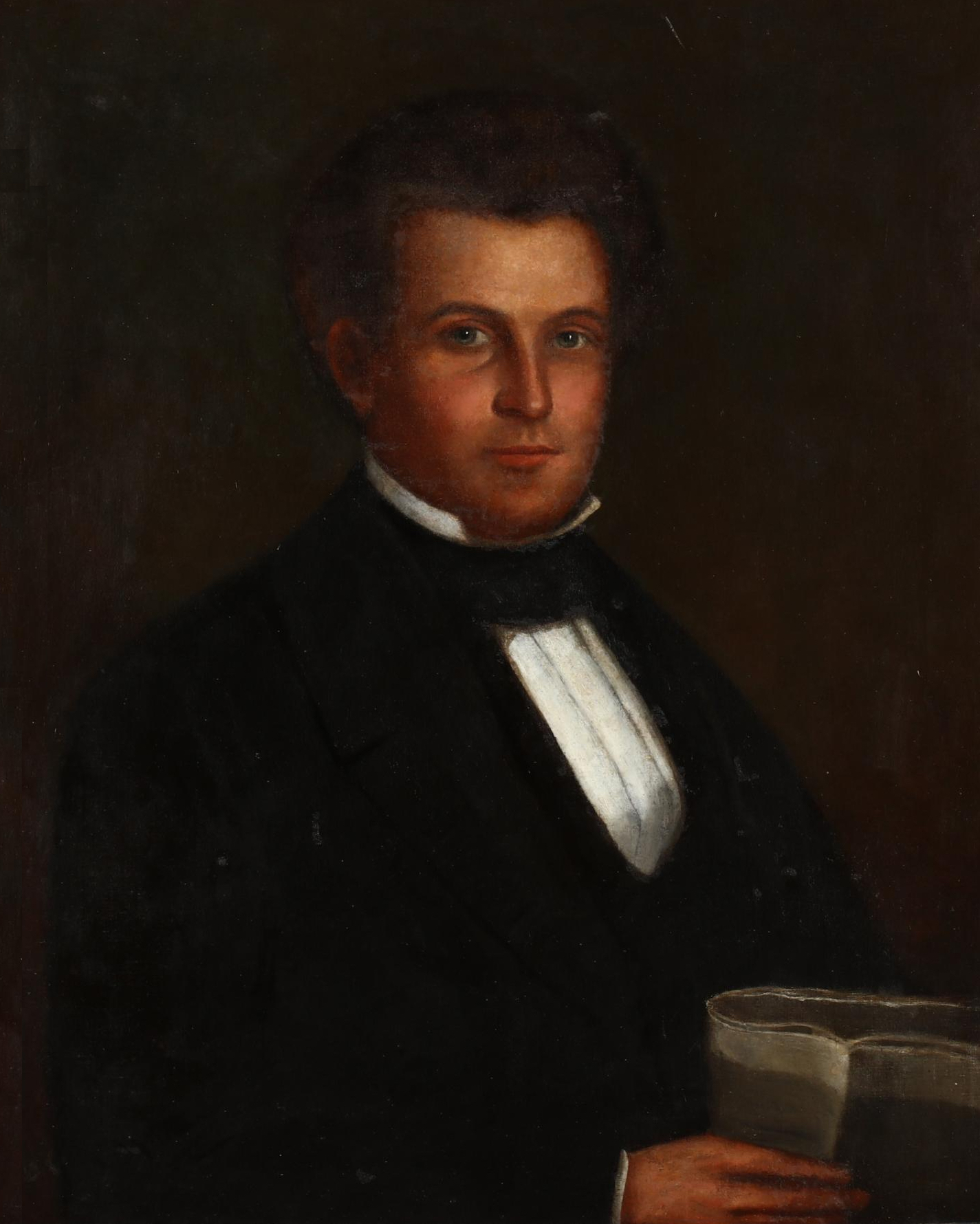
- Portrait of Payne, c. 1830

Member of the U.S. House of Representatives from Alabama's 4th district
- In office March 4, 1841 – March 3, 1847 at-large: March 4, 1841 – March 3, 1843
- Preceded by: Dixon Hall Lewis
- Succeeded by: Samuel Williams Inge

Member of the Alabama House of Representatives
- In office November 7, 1836 – December 2, 1839
- Preceded by: William S. Chapman
- Succeeded by: P. S. Cromwell; Blake Little; R. F. Houston
- Constituency: Sumter County
- In office November 21, 1831 – November 19, 1832 Serving with John S. McRae
- Preceded by: Benjamin Hudson
- Succeeded by: Benjamin Hudson
- Constituency: Franklin County

Personal details
- Born: January 2, 1807 Warrenton, Virginia, U.S.
- Died: September 2, 1874 (aged 67) Warrenton, Virginia, U.S.
- Party: Democratic
- Spouse: Minerva West Winston (m. 1826)
- Relatives: William H. F. Payne (half-cousin; son-in-law)
- Occupation: Planter; politician

William Winter Payne (January 2, 1807 – September 2, 1874) was a U.S. representative from Alabama.

== Early life and education ==
Born at "Granville," near Warrenton, Virginia, Payne completed preparatory studies. He studied law but never practiced.

== Career ==
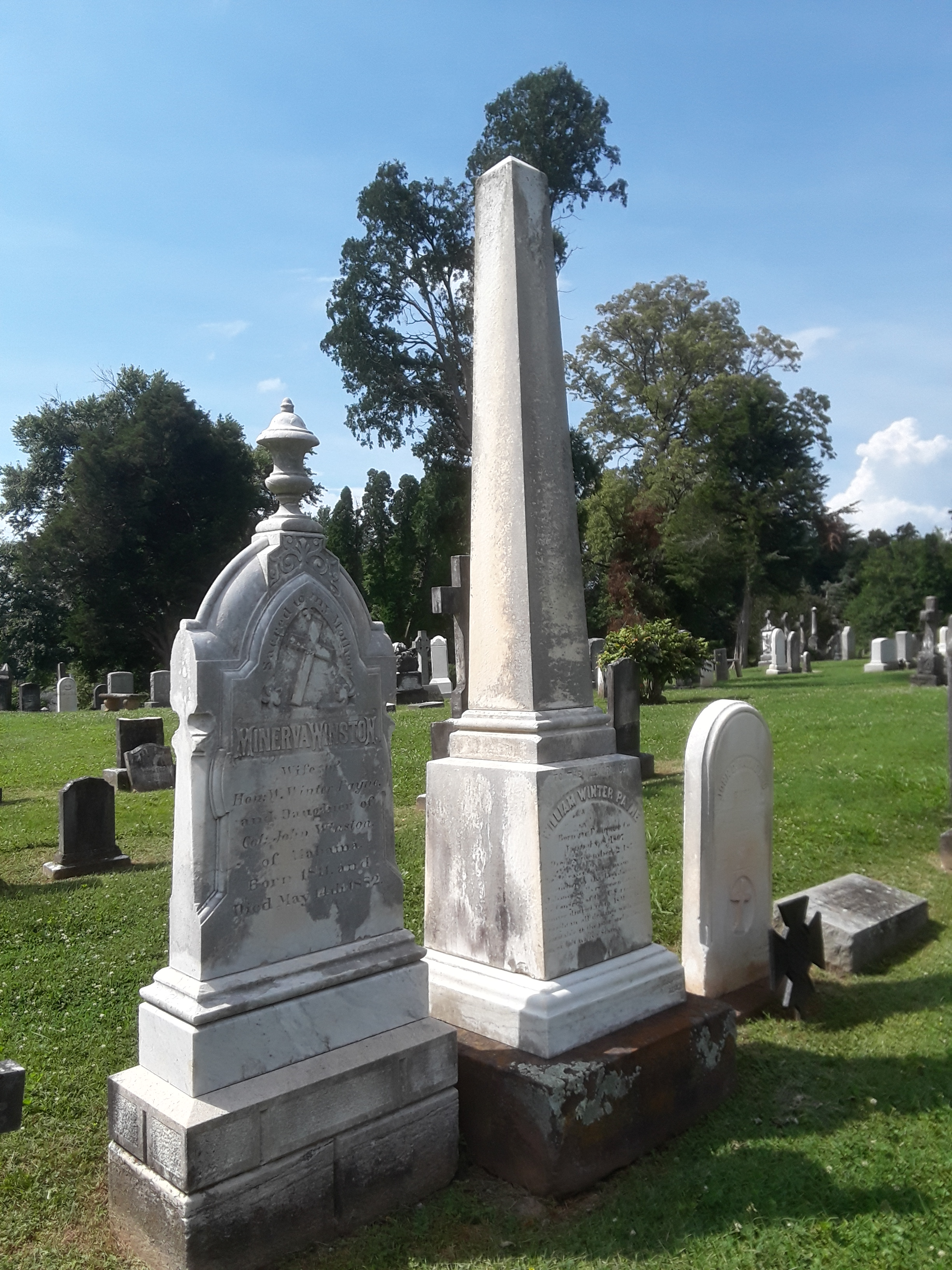
Grave of Payne and his wife in the Warrenton Cemetery

Payne moved to Franklin County, Alabama, in 1825 and engaged in planting. He served as member of the State house of representatives in 1831. He moved to Sumter County, Alabama. He was again a member of the State house of representatives 1836–1839. He was an unsuccessful candidate for the State senate in 1839. Payne was elected as a Democrat to the Twenty-seventh, Twenty-eighth, and Twenty-ninth Congresses (March 4, 1841 – March 3, 1847). He served as chairman of the Committee on Elections (Twenty-eighth Congress). He was an unsuccessful candidate for reelection in 1846 to the Thirtieth Congress.

== Later life and death ==
Payne returned to Virginia in 1847 and engaged in planting near Warrenton. He served as chairman of the Democratic State convention in 1859. He died in Warrenton, Virginia on September 2, 1874. He was interred in the City Cemetery.

U.S. House of Representatives
Preceded by District inactive	Member of the U.S. House of Representatives from Alabama's at-large congressional district March 4, 1841 – March 3, 1843	Succeeded by District inactive
Preceded by Dixon Hall Lewis	Member of the U.S. House of Representatives from Alabama's 4th congressional district March 4, 1843 – March 3, 1847	Succeeded by Samuel Williams Inge
