= George W. Owen =

American politician

George Washington Owen

10th Mayor of Mobile
- In office 1836–1837
- Preceded by: John Everett
- Succeeded by: George Walton

Member of the U.S. House of Representatives from Alabama's 3rd district
- In office March 4, 1823 – March 3, 1829
- Preceded by: New district
- Succeeded by: Dixon Hall Lewis

Personal details
- Born: George Washington Owen; October 20, 1796 Brunswick County, Virginia, U.S.
- Died: August 18, 1837 (aged 40)
- Party: Democratic-Republican (1823–1825); Jacksonian (1825–1829)
- Education: University of Nashville (LLB)

George Washington Owen (October 20, 1796 – August 18, 1837) was an American attorney and politician who served as a member of the United States House of Representatives for Alabama's 3rd congressional district and the 10th mayor of Mobile.

== Early life and education ==
Owen was born in Brunswick County, Virginia, in 1796, but moved to Tennessee at a young age. He graduated from the University of Nashville, where he studied law.

== Career ==
Owen was admitted to the bar in 1816 and moved to Alabama to practice law. He also served in the Alabama House of Representatives. Owen unsuccessfully ran for Congress in 1821 and successfully in 1823 when he became the first representative of Alabama's 3rd congressional district. He served in that position until 1829, when he was succeeded by Dixon Hall Lewis, who later became a member of the United States Senate. Owen was elected mayor of Mobile, Alabama, in 1836, a position in which he served until his death the following year.

== Personal life ==
In 1823, he married Louise Sarah Hollinger, the daughter of Adam Hollinger (for whom Hollinger's Island is named), who was the great-granddaughter of Mobile co-founder Charles Rochon.

U.S. House of Representatives
Preceded by (none)	Representative of Alabama's 3rd Congressional District; 1823–1829	Succeeded by Dixon Hall Lewis
Political offices
Preceded by John Everett	10th Mayor of Mobile; 1836 – August 18, 1837	Succeeded by George Walton
