= George W. Crabb =

American politician

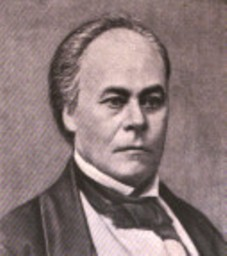

Member of the U.S. House of Representatives from Alabama's 3rd district
- In office September 4, 1838 – March 3, 1841
- Preceded by: Joab Lawler
- Succeeded by: District inactive

Member of the Alabama Senate
- In office 1837-1838

Member of the Alabama House of Representatives
- In office 1836-1837

Personal details
- Born: George Whitfield Crabb; February 22, 1804 Manningham, Alabama
- Died: August 15, 1846 (aged 42) Philadelphia, Pennsylvania
- Party: Whig

George Whitfield Crabb (February 22, 1804 – August 15, 1846) was a U.S. representative from Alabama.

Born in Botetourt County, Virginia, Crabb attended the public schools. He lived in Nashville for a time. He moved to Tuscaloosa, Alabama.

Crabb was elected assistant secretary of the State senate and comptroller of public accounts in 1829. He served in the Florida Indian War of 1836 and was lieutenant colonel of the Alabama Volunteers. He served as member of the State house of representatives in 1836 and 1837. He served in the State senate in 1837 and 1838. He was elected or appointed Major general of militia, and was thus known as Gen. Crabb.

Crabb was elected as a Whig to the Twenty-fifth Congress to fill the vacancy caused by the death of Joab Lawler. He was reelected to the Twenty-sixth Congress and served from September 4, 1838, to March 4, 1841. He was an unsuccessful candidate for reelection to the Twenty-seventh Congress. He was appointed judge of the county court of Mobile in 1846. He died in Philadelphia, Pennsylvania, August 15, 1846. He was interred in Greenwood Cemetery, Tuscaloosa, Alabama.

== See also ==
- Henry A. Crabb – American politician and filibuster, nephew
- Henry Crabb (judge) – American judge (1793–1827), brother

U.S. House of Representatives
| Preceded by Joab Lawler | Member of the U.S. House of Representatives from Alabama's 3rd congressional district September 4, 1838 - March 3, 1841 | Succeeded by District inactive |
