= Luke Pryor =

American politician (1820–1900)

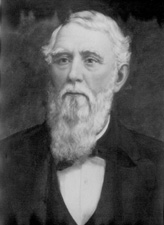

United States Senator from Alabama
- In office January 7, 1880 – November 23, 1880
- Appointed by: Rufus W. Cobb
- Preceded by: George S. Houston
- Succeeded by: James L. Pugh

Member of the U.S. House of Representatives from Alabama's 8th district
- In office March 4, 1883 – March 3, 1885
- Preceded by: Joseph Wheeler
- Succeeded by: Joseph Wheeler

Personal details
- Born: July 5, 1820 Huntsville, Alabama
- Died: August 5, 1900 (aged 80) Athens, Alabama
- Party: Democratic

Luke Pryor (July 5, 1820 – August 5, 1900) was a U.S. senator from the state of Alabama. He was appointed to fill the Senate term left by the death of George S. Houston and served from January 7 to November 23, 1880, when a replacement was elected. Pryor was a Democrat. He is interred at City Cemetery in Athens, Alabama.

== Biography ==
=== Birth and Parentage ===
He was born in 1820 in Alabama to parents Luke Pryor and Ann Batte Lane. His father's first marriage was to Martha Scott, a sister of General Winfield Scott. His brother was the noted racehorse trainer John Benjamin Pryor of Natchez, Mississippi.

=== Life in Alabama ===
Pryor married Isabella Virginia Harris. They were the parents of 8 children, all born in Alabama. Luke Pryor lived at the Sugar Creek Plantation, in Athens, Alabama, for 40 years before his death. Pryor House, built in 1836, stands as a historic building in Limestone County, Alabama. Pryor studied law and was admitted to the bar in 1841. On the 1850 United States Census his occupation was recorded as "lawyer."

Luke Pryor was an enslaver. On the 1840 Census, six free blacks under the age of 10 were recorded in his father's household, as well as one enslaved male child under ten and an older female between 55 and 100. By 1850, Luke Pryor was recorded as enslaving 39 people between the ages of four months and 70 years; however, in 1860, only two enslaved people were recorded in his household. The American Civil War did not begin until April 12, 1861, and slavery was not completely abolished until 1865 after the ratification of the Thirteenth Amendment.

U.S. Senate
Preceded by George S. Houston	U.S. senator (Class 3) from Alabama; 1880; Served alongside: John T. Morgan	Succeeded by James L. Pugh
U.S. House of Representatives
Preceded by Joseph Wheeler	Member of the U.S. House of Representatives from Alabama's 8th congressional district 1883–1885	Succeeded by Joseph Wheeler
