= Alabama's 10th congressional district =

Former congressional district

Coordinates: 32°39′28.35″N 86°47′31.17″W

- Obsolete district
- Population (1920): 170,857
- Years active: March 4, 1917 – March 3, 1933

Alabama's 10th congressional district is an obsolete district which existed from 1917 until 1933. Its sole representative was William B. Bankhead. (Alabama had been apportioned a 10th seat in the U.S. House of Representatives after the 1910 census, but that seat was elected at-large from the entire state in 1912 and 1914.)

== Historic boundaries ==
Census year	Population	Counties
1920	170,857	Fayette, Franklin, Lamar, Marion, Pickens, Walker, Winston

== List of members representing the district ==
Representative	Party	Years	Cong ress	Electoral history	Electoral Map
District created March 4, 1917
. William B. Bankhead (Jasper)	Democratic	March 4, 1917 – March 3, 1933	65th 66th 67th 68th 69th 70th 71st 72nd	Elected in 1916. Re-elected in 1918. Re-elected in 1920. Re-elected in 1922. Re-elected in 1924. Re-elected in 1926. Re-elected in 1928. Re-elected in 1930. Redistricted to the 7th district.	
District eliminated March 3, 1933
