= Truman H. Aldrich =

American politician (1848–1932)

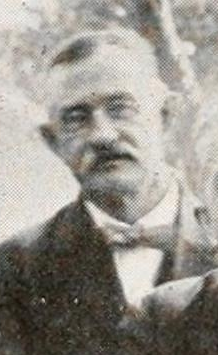

Member of the U.S. House of Representatives from Alabama's 9th district
- In office June 9, 1896 – March 4, 1897
- Preceded by: Oscar W. Underwood
- Succeeded by: Oscar W. Underwood

Personal details
- Born: Truman Heminway Aldrich; October 17, 1848 Palmyra, New York
- Died: April 28, 1932 (aged 83) Birmingham, Alabama
- Party: Republican
- Spouse: Anna Morrison
- Education: Rensselaer Polytechnic Institute
- Profession: civil engineer, paleontologist

Truman Heminway Aldrich (October 17, 1848 – April 28, 1932) was a civil engineer, a mining company executive, and a paleontologist, and briefly served in the United States House of Representatives and as Postmaster of Birmingham. He is the sole Republican ever to represent Alabama's 9th congressional district, which existed from 1893 to 1963. His brother William F. Aldrich also represented Alabama in Congress, serving three partial terms during 1896–1901 from Alabama's 4th congressional district.

== Early life and education ==
Aldrich was born in Palmyra and suffered from poor health as a young boy. He attended public schools and a military academy at West Chester, Pennsylvania before enrolling at the Rensselaer Polytechnic Institute in Troy, New York. He graduated in 1869 with a degree in mining and civil engineering and took a job with the railroads in New York and New Jersey. In 1870 he married Anna Morrison of Newark.

== Alabama coalfield development ==
Aldrich's career was characterized by innovation and long-term vision. His strength was in finding new resources, developing them and then moving on to the next discovery. He was an honorable man in science as well as in business.

In 1872, Aldrich became a partner in a banking enterprise in Selma, Alabama. While in the region, he investigated the existing coal-mining operations at Montevallo and around the Cahaba Coal Field. The next year he secured a lease on the Montevallo coal mines and set to work extracting coal that summer. He purchased the mines outright in 1875 and named the surrounding settlement Aldrich, leasing the operation to his younger brother William while he prospected for new seams. He incorporated the Jefferson Coal Company in the town of Morris, from which he supplied fuel for the first successful coke-fired furnace in the Birmingham District, helping to establish the area as a center of iron and steel production.

In 1881 Aldrich founded the Cahaba Coal Company in Bibb County. After building a railroad connector, the company laid out a "model community" on the bank of Caffee Creek. After seeing a "ton block" of coal brought from the mine, Aldrich named the town Blocton. Blocton coal earned a reputation as an efficient fuel for steam locomotives and the profitable company embarked on a period of great expansion. Aldrich advertised widely for miners who arrived from all over the United States, as well as Western and Central Europe. By the summer of 1890 over 3,600 people were residents of Blocton and products from the companies' mines and ovens were being sold to customers throughout the Southeast and parts of Latin America.

In addition to his many business interests, Aldrich pursued a lifelong fascination with shell collecting, eventually amassing one of the largest amateur collections of his time, partly by purchase and partly by collecting in person. In the 1890s he joined a "Shell Syndicate" to support naturalists Herbert Huntington Smith and Amelia W. (Daisy) Smith, who collected freshwater and terrestrial mollusks in Alabama and Georgia. State Geologist Eugene Allen Smith encouraged Aldrich to concentrate his efforts in the Tertiary paleontology of the Coastal Plain, often sending him material to identify, and Aldrich collected thousands of fossils from now-classic sites along the Alabama and Tombigbee Rivers, such as Claiborne. He contributed an article to Bulletin 1 of the Geological Survey of Alabama on the state's Eocene fossil record, including nine plates illustrating new species. His collection of modern shells is now in the Florida Museum of Natural History in Gainesville, and his fossil shells are in the Geological Survey of Alabama Paleontological Collection and the Alabama Museum of Natural History.

Aldrich also supplied information on the coal fields he had surveyed to John Witherspoon Dubose and to Squire's Report on the Cahaba Coal Field published by the Geological Survey of Alabama in 1890.

== Later career ==
In 1890 Aldrich faced a major labor strike initiated by the United Mine Workers of America. He defeated this strike by hiring, for the first time, African Americans to operate the mine. In 1892 Aldrich sold the combined Cahaba and Excelsior Coal Company to the Tennessee Coal, Iron and Railroad Company. Aldrich became a second vice-president and general manager for TCI. As an executive of that company he secured investments that helped TCI survive the depression of 1893, including a contribution of grain and flour from B. B. Comer. He moved his residence from Blocton to Birmingham.

In 1896 Aldrich secured the Republican nomination to the 54th United States Congress by contesting the election of Oscar W. Underwood. As a Republican in a largely Democratic state, Aldrich served for less than a year before being defeated by Underwood in the 1896 election. He returned to the coal business as president of the Cahaba Southern Mining Company, which operated mines at Hargrove in Bibb County. In 1899 he became a vice-president of the Birmingham Machinery and Foundry Company and, two years later, was named the acting president of the Sloss-Sheffield Steel & Iron Company. He also opened the Virginia mines, which were the site of a tragic explosion in 1905 in Hueytown, Alabama that killed over 100 miners.

In 1902 Aldrich joined his son in a prospecting venture in Tallapoosa County called the Hillabee Gold Company. In 1905 he bought the Montevallo Mining Company back and served until 1910 as its president. In 1911 President William Howard Taft, who had been a neighbor in Cincinnati, Ohio, appointed him as Postmaster of Birmingham.

Aldrich's paleontological hobby became his career in later life, when Eugene Allen Smith appointed him as Curator of Paleontology of the Alabama Museum of Natural History. He donated large collections of Southeastern fossils, many from sites that are no longer exposed today. Under Herbert Huntington Smith and Daisy Smith, who were hired in 1909, the Museum continued his species-based cataloging system for fossils and Aldrich continued to write short articles on Tertiary mollusks. His research into the area's paleontology earned him wide esteem and he was awarded an honorary doctorate by the University of Alabama. He described over 200 species.

In 1930, the octogenarian Aldrich named new ichnogenera of fossil footprints that were discovered in a University of Alabama coalmine in Walker County, Alabama—his only venture into the field of ichnology. Although his descriptions were brief, the well-reproduced photographic plates brought this work to renewed attention when similar trackways were discovered in 1999 at the nearby Union Chapel Mine (now the Stephen C. Minkin Paleozoic Footprint Site).

E. A. Smith was a close friend of T. H. Aldrich, and named one of his sons Truman Aldrich Smith in his honor. J.H. Blake was also a close friend of Aldrich and named his only son Truman Aldrich Blake. J.H. Blake's daughter, Laura Blake Murphy, named her first son Truman Burgess Murphy, and he named his first son Truman Burgess Murphy Jr.

Truman Aldrich died in 1932 at the age of 83 and was buried in Birmingham's Elmwood Cemetery.

== Publications ==
- Aldrich T. H. (1886). Preliminary Report on the Tertiary Fossils of Alabama and Mississippi. Geological survey of Alabama. 15-60, 6 plates.
- Aldrich T. H. & Cunningham K. M. (1894). "Paleontology". In: Report on the geology of the coastal plain of Alabama. Geological Survey of Alabama.
- Aldrich T. H. (1895). Contested election case of T. H. Aldrich v. Oscar W. Underwood. Washington: Government Printing Office.
- Aldrich T. H. (1931). Description of a Few Alabama Eocene Species and Remarks on Varieties. University, Alabama: Geological Survey of Alabama, Bulletin.
- Aldrich T. H. Sr. & Jones W. B. (1930). Footprints from the Coal Measures of Alabama. University, Alabama: Geological Survey of Alabama, Museum Paper 9, 64 pp.

U.S. House of Representatives
Preceded by Oscar W. Underwood	Member of the U.S. House of Representatives from Alabama's 9th congressional district June 9, 1896 – March 3, 1897	Succeeded by Oscar W. Underwood
