= Penthelia =

Penthelia was an ancient Egyptian priestess-musician who served the creator god Ptah, the god of fire, in the temple of Memphis.

The eighteenth-century English writer Bryant claimed the authorship of the Iliad and the Odyssey poems were written by Penthelia, and stolen from the archives of the temple by Homer in travels through Egypt. Matilda Joslyn Gage finds support for this in Diodorus Siculus, Vol I, Chap. 7, based on the potion Helen gave Telemachus and that potion's use in historic Thebes, Egypt.
