= Mary Emily Bates Coues =

American suffragist and society woman

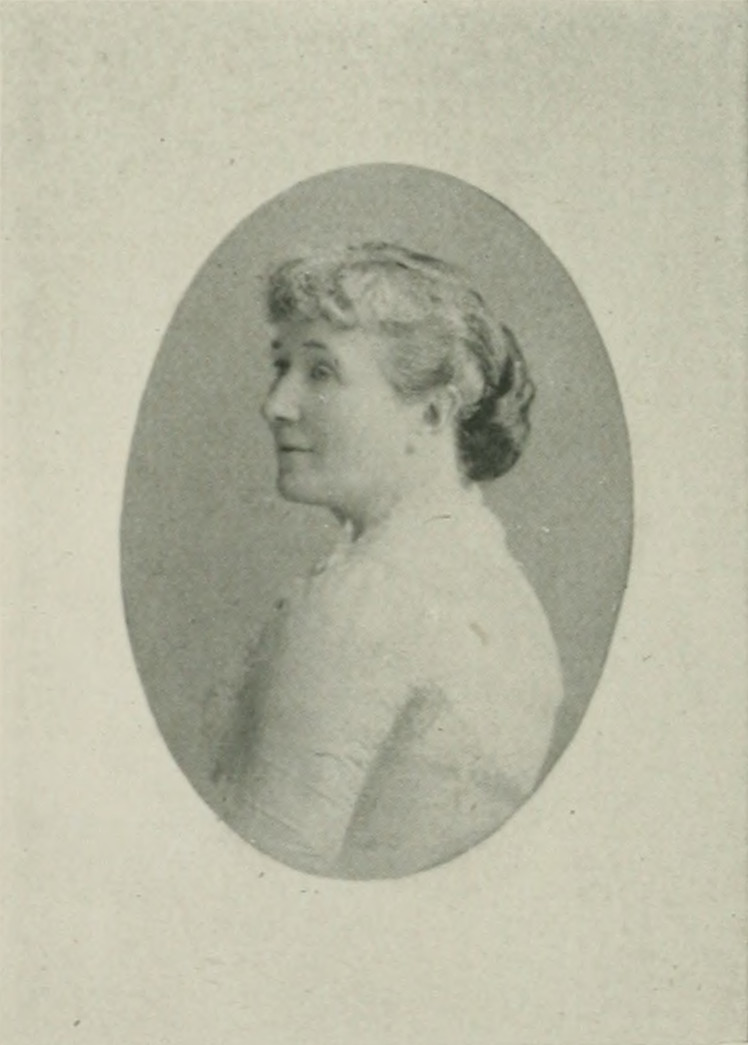
- "A Woman of the Century"
- Born: Mary Emily Bennett; August 26, 1835; New York City
- Died: February 16, 1906 (aged 70); Washington, D.C.
- Other names: Mary Emily Bates
- Occupation: suffragist
- Known for: women's rights; spiritualism; occult
- Spouses: Joseph William Bates (m. 1866; died 1886); Elliott Coues (m. 1887; died 1899)
- Relatives: Aaron Burr; Henry Byam Martin; Thomas Byam Martin

Mary Emily Bates Coues (née, Bennett; after first marriage, Bates; after second marriage, Coues; August 26, 1835 – February 16, 1906) was an American suffragist and society woman of the long nineteenth century, committed to women's rights, spiritualism, and the occult.

== Early life and education ==
Mary Emily Bennett was born in New York City, August 26, 1835. She was a daughter of Henry Silliman Bennett, president of the New York Bible Society (an office he held till his death), and Mary Emily Martin Bennett.

On her father's side, she was a collateral descendant of Aaron Burr, cousin of Mr. Bennett, and was connected with the Silliman family of New Haven, Connecticut, which included the two Benjamins, father and son, both distinguished scientists. The maternal ancestry included the name of Foote, notable in New England annals, and of Martin, borne by several officers of high rank in the English navy. Sir Henry Byam Martin, K. C. B., the second son of Admiral Sir Thomas Byam Martin, KCB, Admiral of the Fleet and vice-admiral of the United Kingdom, for many years comptroller of the navy and member of Parliament for Plymouth, was Mrs. Bennett's cousin. The Martin family resided in Antigua, where they owned large estates, and Sir William Byam, who died in 1869, was president of the council of Antigua and colonel of the Antigua dragoons. The grand-aunts of Coues were the Misses Martin -Catherine, Penelope and Eliza- long known in New England for their devotion to education, whose historical school (Misses Martin's School for Young Ladies) was in Portland, Maine.

As a child, she was reared within the Presbyterian church, which her mind rejected early.

Her education was completed under private tuition in London and Paris, the first of the 24 times she crossed the ocean. Many of her earlier years were passed enjoying herself in various European capitals, in strong contrast with the severity of her early training, an experience which served to broaden and strengthen her intellectual grasp.

== Career ==
Coues became an accomplished musician, an art critic, a linguist and a society woman. In Dresden, on March 28, 1866, she married Joseph William Bates, of Portsmouth, a leading merchant of Philadelphia, Pennsylvania. She had no children. Her twenty years of married life were divided between her homes in Yorkshire, England, and in Philadelphia. She was wealthy and could indulge her tastes for music and art. Her Philadelphia mansion was noted for the elegance and lavishness of its hospitality, its wonderful dinners and one of the finest private collections of paintings in the U.S. Mr. Bates died in Philadelphia, March 27, 1886.

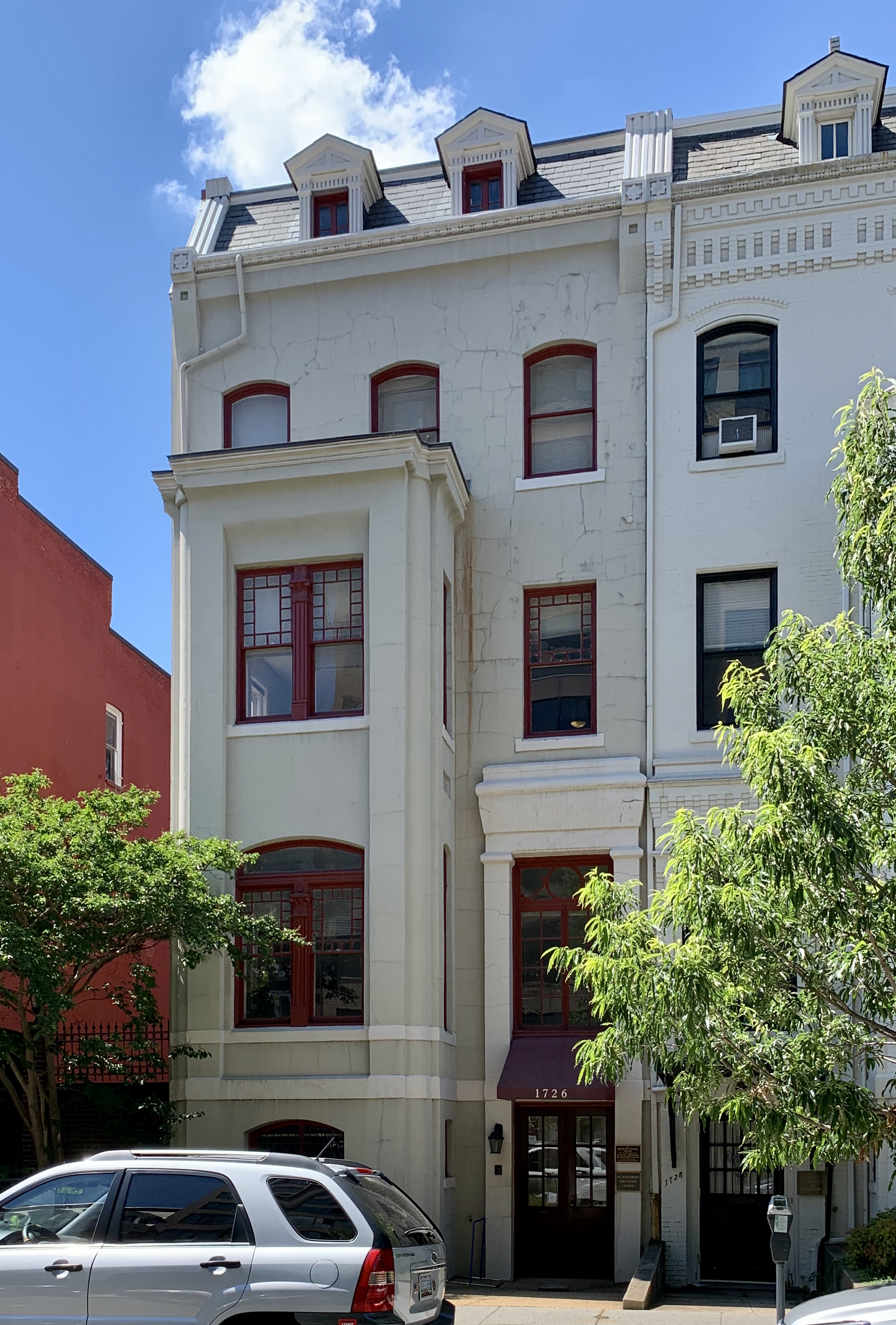
Coues House, N Street, Washington, D.C

Through the influence of Dr. Elliott Coues, of Washington, D.C., Mrs. Bates joined the American Board of Control in 1886. That year, he also divorced his second wife. On October 25, 1887, at the Hotel Vendome, in Boston, Massachusetts, Mrs. Bates and Dr. Coues married. Thereafter, she resided with her husband in their home on N street in that city. She was in sympathy with Dr. Coues' published views on the religious and social questions of the day, and her inspiration of one of his books is recognized in its dedication to his wife.

In 1890, when the Woman's National Liberal Union was established, Coues was elected secretary, the other three officers being Matilda Joslyn Gage, president; Josephine Cables Aldrich, vice-president; and William F. Aldrich, treasurer. Coues was a prominent member of various other organizations for the promotion of enlightened and progressive thought among women, including Woman's Press Club of New York City (corresponding member), Pro Re Nata club, and the Humane Society.

Her attitude was that of the extreme wing of radical reform. Though at heart a deeply religious woman, Coues did not find church communion necessary to her own spiritual aspirations. Among her dominant traits were a strong, intuitive sense of justice, a quick sympathy for all who suffered wrongs and a never-failing indignation at all forms of conventional hypocrisy, intellectual repression and spiritual tyranny. Many were the recipients of her secret charities.

== Death ==
Mary Emily Bates Coues died in Washington, D.C., February 16, 1906. Interment was at Arlington Cemetery. Effects from her estate were put up for auction by C.G. Sloan & Co., Washington, D.C. in May 1906.

== See also ==
- Ida C. Craddock
