= Thomas S. Plowman =

American politician

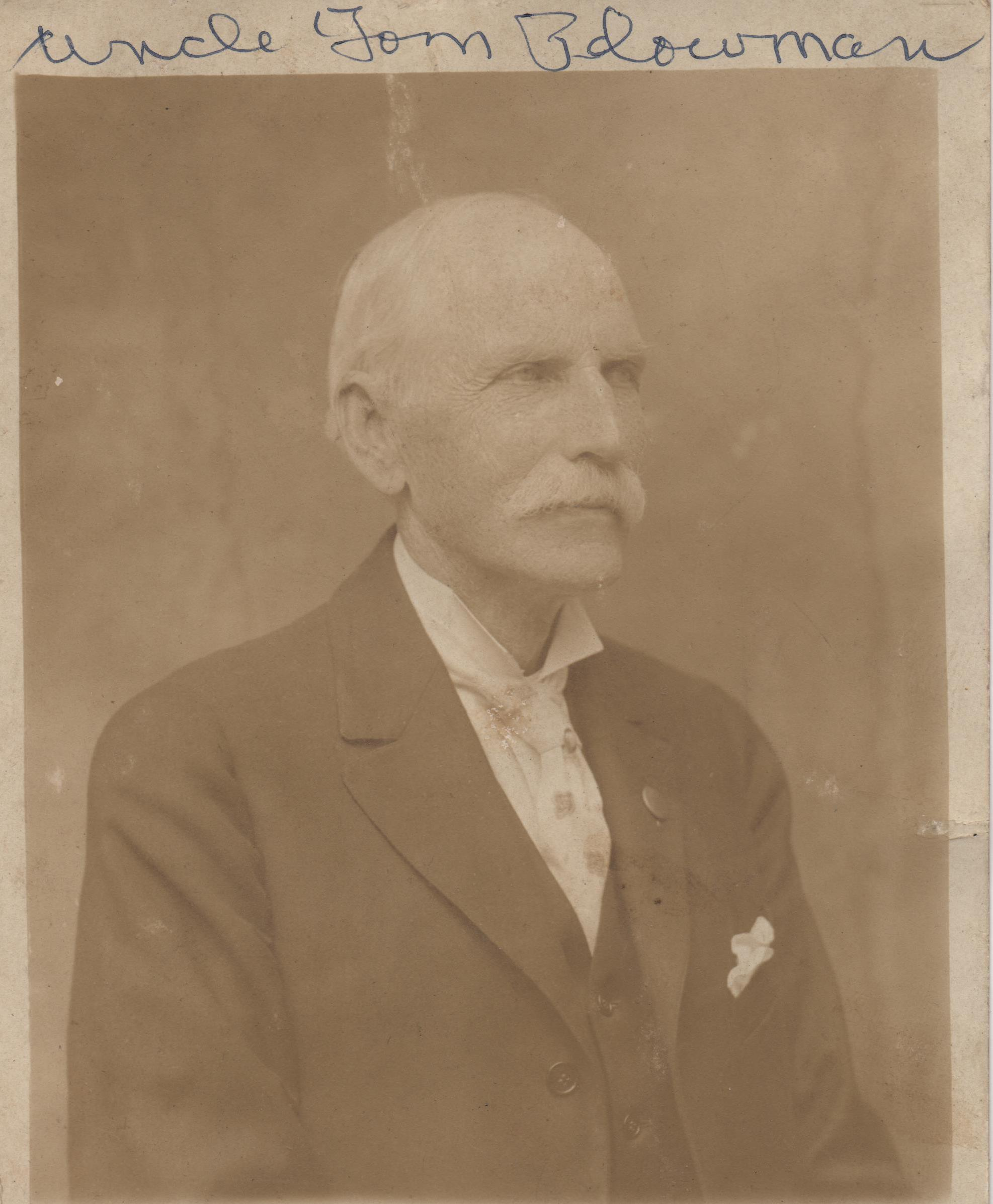

Member of the U.S. House of Representatives from Alabama's 4th district
- In office March 4, 1897 – February 9, 1898
- Preceded by: William F. Aldrich
- Succeeded by: William F. Aldrich

Personal details
- Born: Thomas Scales Plowman; June 8, 1843 Talladega, Alabama
- Died: July 26, 1919 (aged 76) Talladega, Alabama
- Party: Democratic

Thomas Scales Plowman (June 8, 1843 – July 26, 1919) was a U.S. representative from Alabama.

Born in Talladega, Alabama, Plowman attended common schools, joining the Confederate States Army in May 1862 as a member of Company F, Fifty-first Alabama Cavalry. He engaged in agricultural and mercantile pursuits in Talladega.

Plowman was elected mayor in 1872 and served three terms. He served as delegate to the Democratic National Convention in 1888. For a number of years, Plowman served as President of the First National Bank of Talladega. Plowman presented credentials as a Democratic Member-elect to the Fifty-fifth Congress and served from March 4, 1897, to February 9, 1898, when he was succeeded by William F. Aldrich, who contested his election. He served as member and chairman of the Talladega County Jury Commission in 1910 and 1911. He served as member of the State senate in 1912. First president of the Bankhead Highway. He died at his home in Talladega on July 26, 1919, and was interred in Oak Hill Cemetery.

U.S. House of Representatives
Preceded by William F. Aldrich	Member of the U.S. House of Representatives from Alabama's 4th congressional district 1897-1898	Succeeded by William F. Aldrich
