= Elliott Coues House =

Historic house in Washington, D.C., United States

- U.S. National Register of Historic Places
- U.S. National Historic Landmark
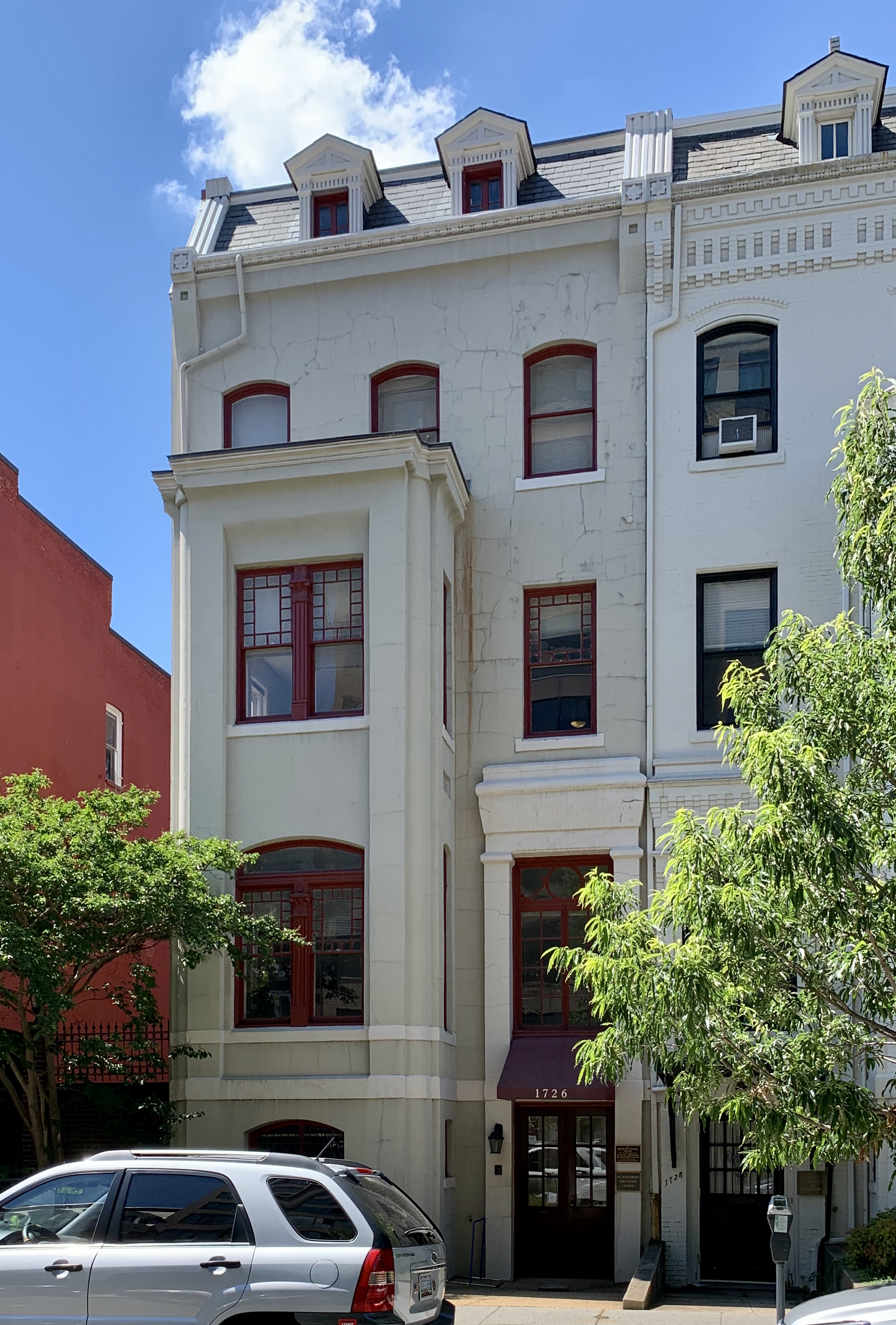

- Location within Central Washington, D.C. Location within the District of Columbia Location within the United States
- Location: 1726 N Street, NW, Washington, D.C.
- Coordinates: 38°54′25″N 77°2′24″W
- Built: c. 1880
- NRHP reference No.: 75002049

Significant dates
- Added to NRHP: May 15, 1975
- Designated NHL: May 15, 1975

The Elliott Coues House is a historic house at 1726 N Street NW, in the Dupont Circle neighborhood of Washington, D.C. Built about 1880, it was the home of 19th-century historian and ornithologist Elliott Coues (1842–99) from about 1887 until his death. Coues helped found the American Ornithologists' Union in 1883 and edited about 15 volumes of journals, memoirs, and diaries by famous Western explorers and fur traders. The house was declared a National Historic Landmark in 1975.

== Description and history ==
The Elliott Coues House is located in Washington's Dupont Circle neighborhood, on the south side of N Street, west of Scott Circle between 17th and 18th Streets. It is the left one of two similar painted brick row houses, which were probably built around 1880. Coues' house is the simpler of the two; it is 3 1/2 stories in height with a dormered gable roof and a tall basement. Its facade is three bays wide, the left two taken up by a projecting rectangular bay. The entrance is in the right bay of the basement level, framed by pilasters and entablature that rise to also enclose the first-floor window. The building is not architecturally distinguished.

Elliott Coues moved into this house in about 1887, and it remained his principal residence for the rest of his life. A native of New Hampshire, Coues served in the United States Army from 1862 until 1881, pursuing a scientific interest in birds as an avocation. From 1873 to 1876 he served in the Pacific Northwest as a surveyor and naturalist for the U.S. Northern Boundary Commission, and in 1880 he became secretary and naturalist for the predecessor to the United States Geological Survey. In the latter role he edited and published a great deal of material documenting the days of the "Old West". In 1883 he helped found the American Ornithologists' Union, also holding a chair in the anatomy department at Columbia University.

== See also ==
- List of National Historic Landmarks in Washington, D.C.
- National Register of Historic Places listings in the upper NW Quadrant of Washington, D.C.
- Mary Emily Bates Coues
