= Alabama's 4th congressional district =

U.S. House district for Alabama

Coordinates: 34°1′31.25″N 87°7′57.25″W

- Interactive map of district boundaries since January 3, 2025 (Note: The district has the same boundary as chosen by the District Court for the Northern District of Alabama in 2023 for the 2024 elections as a result of Allen v. Milligan, and as drawn by the Alabama Legislature in 2026 as a result of Louisiana v. Callais. As such, boundaries of the district will not change at the 2026 elections.)
- Representative: Robert Aderholt; R–Haleyville
- Area: 8,524 mi^{2} (22,080 km^{2})
- Distribution: 65.38% rural; 34.62% urban
- Population (2025): 735,085
- Median household income: $65,144
- Ethnicity: 80.2% White; 8.0% Hispanic; 6.9% Black; 3.7% Two or more races; 0.6% Asian; 0.6% other
- Occupation: 46% White-collar; 40.8% Blue-collar; 13.2% Gray-collar
- Cook PVI: R+33

Alabama's 4th congressional district is a U.S. congressional district in Alabama, which elects a representative to the United States House of Representatives. It encompasses the counties of Lauderdale, Colbert, Franklin, Marion, Lamar, Fayette, Walker, Winston, Cullman, Marshall, DeKalb, and Blount counties. It also includes parts of Lauderdale and Tuscaloosa counties, as well as parts of the Decatur Metropolitan Area and the Huntsville-Decatur Combined Statistical Area.

It is currently represented by Republican Robert Aderholt. In the 2016 presidential election, the district was the only one in the country to give Republican nominee Donald Trump more than 80% of the vote, making it his strongest district in the country. Trump went on to improve on this performance in 2020, winning 81% of the vote, and he further improved on this result in the 2024, winning 83% of the district's votes. With a Cook Partisan Voting Index rating of R+33, it is the most Republican district in the United States, and tied with California's 37th district and New York's 12th district (both of which are D+33) for the ninth most extreme on either side of the political spectrum.

== Recent election results from statewide races ==
The following chart shows the results of recent federal and statewide races in the 4th district.

Year	Office	Winner	D %	R %
2012	President	Mitt Romney (R)	23.9%	74.7%
2016	President	Donald Trump (R)	17.3%	79.7%
2016	Senate	Richard Shelby (R)	21.0%	78.8%
2017	Senate (special)	Roy Moore (R)	30.3%	67.9%
2018	Governor	Kay Ivey (R)	24.6%	75.2%
2018	Lieutenant Governor	Will Ainsworth (R)	21.2%	78.7%
2018	Attorney General	Steve Marshall (R)	24.7%	75.2%
2020	President	Donald Trump (R)	17.7%	81.1%
2020	Senate	Tommy Tuberville (R)	21.1%	78.7%
Redistricted for the 2022 cycle
2022	Senate	Katie Britt (R)	13.9%	83.8%
2022	Governor	Kay Ivey (R)	12.4%	84.1%
2022	Attorney General	Steve Marshall (R)	14.3%	85.6%
2022	Secretary of State	Wes Allen (R)	13.8%	83.6%
Redistricted for the 2024 cycle
2024	President	Donald Trump (R)	16.3%	82.6%

== Counties and communities within the district ==
For the 119th and successive Congresses (based on the districts drawn following the Supreme Court's decision in Allen v. Milligan), the district contains all or portions of the following counties and communities.

Blount County (18)

All 18 communities

Cullman County (15)

All 15 communities

Colbert County (6)

All six communities

DeKalb County (17)

All 17 communities

Fayette County (6)

All six communities

Franklin County (7)

All seven communities

Lamar County (6)

All six communities

Lauderdale County (5)

Florence, Killen, St. Florian, Underwood-Petersville, Waterloo

Marion County (10)

All 10 communities

Marshall County (9)

All nine communities

Tuscaloosa County (4)

Coker, Holt (part; also 7th), Northport, Tuscaloosa (part; also 7th)

Walker County (11)

All 11 communities

Winston County (6)

All six communities

== List of members representing the district ==
Member	Party	Years	Cong ress	Electoral history	Location
District created March 4, 1833
Dixon Hall Lewis (Montgomery)	Nullifier	March 4, 1833 – March 3, 1837	23rd 24th 25th 26th	Redistricted from the 3rd district. and re-elected in 1833. Re-elected in 1835. Re-elected in 1837. Re-elected in 1839. Redistricted to the at-large district.	
Dixon Hall Lewis (Montgomery)	Democratic	March 4, 1837 – March 3, 1841	23rd 24th 25th 26th	Redistricted from the 3rd district. and re-elected in 1833. Re-elected in 1835. Re-elected in 1837. Re-elected in 1839. Redistricted to the at-large district.	
District inactive		March 3, 1841 – March 3, 1843	27th	All representatives elected at-large on a general ticket.	
William Winter Payne (Gainesville)	Democratic	March 4, 1843 – March 3, 1847	28th 29th	Redistricted from the at-large district and re-elected in 1843. Re-elected in 1845. Lost re-election.	
Samuel Williams Inge (Livingston)	Democratic	March 4, 1847 – March 3, 1851	30th 31st	Elected in 1847. Re-elected in 1849. Retired.	
William Russell Smith (Fayette)	Union	March 4, 1851 – March 3, 1853	32nd 33rd 34th	Elected in 1851. Re-elected in 1853. Re-elected in 1855. Lost re-election.	
William Russell Smith (Fayette)	Democratic	March 4, 1853 – March 3, 1855	32nd 33rd 34th	Elected in 1851. Re-elected in 1853. Re-elected in 1855. Lost re-election.	
William Russell Smith (Fayette)	American	March 4, 1855 – March 3, 1857	32nd 33rd 34th	Elected in 1851. Re-elected in 1853. Re-elected in 1855. Lost re-election.	
Sydenham Moore (Greensboro)	Democratic	March 4, 1857 – January 21, 1861	35th 36th	Elected in 1857. Re-elected in 1859. Withdrew due to Civil War.	
Vacant		January 21, 1861 – July 21, 1868	36th 37th 38th 39th 40th	Civil War and Reconstruction	
Charles Wilson Pierce (Demopolis)	Republican	July 21, 1868 – March 3, 1869	40th	Elected for partial term in 1868. Retired.	
Charles Hays (Eutaw)	Republican	March 4, 1869 – March 3, 1877	41st 42nd 43rd 44th	Elected in 1868. Re-elected in 1870. Re-elected in 1872. Re-elected in 1874. Retired.	
Charles M. Shelley (Selma)	Democratic	March 4, 1877 – July 20, 1882	45th 46th 47th	Elected in 1876. Re-elected in 1878. Re-elected in 1880. Seat declared vacant after election contest by James Q. Smith.	
Vacant		July 20, 1882 – November 7, 1882	47th		
Charles M. Shelley (Selma)	Democratic	November 7, 1882 – January 9, 1885	47th 48th	Elected to fill the vacancy. Also elected to the next term in 1882. Lost election contest.	
George Henry Craig (Selma)	Republican	January 9, 1885 – March 3, 1885	48th	Successfully contested Shelley's re-election. Lost re-election.	
Alexander C. Davidson (Uniontown)	Democratic	March 4, 1885 – March 3, 1889	49th 50th	Elected in 1884. Re-elected in 1886. Lost renomination.	
Louis Washington Turpin (Newbern)	Democratic	March 4, 1889 – June 4, 1890	51st	Elected in 1888. Lost election contest.	
John Van McDuffie (Hayneville)	Republican	June 4, 1890 – March 3, 1891	51st	Successfully contested Turpin's 1888 election. Lost re-election.	
Louis Washington Turpin (Newbern)	Democratic	March 4, 1891 – March 3, 1893	52nd	Elected in 1890. McDuffie unsuccessfully contested the election. Redistricted to the 9th district.	
Gaston A. Robbins (Selma)	Democratic	March 4, 1893 – March 13, 1896	53rd 54th	Elected in 1892. Re-elected in 1894. Lost election contest.	
William F. Aldrich (Aldrich)	Republican	March 13, 1896 – March 3, 1897	54th	Successfully contested Robbins's 1894 election. Lost re-election.	
Thomas S. Plowman (Talladega)	Democratic	March 4, 1897 – February 9, 1898	55th	Elected in 1896. Lost election contest.	
William F. Aldrich (Aldrich)	Republican	February 9, 1898 – March 3, 1899	55th	Successfully contested Plowman's 1896 election. Lost re-election.	
Gaston A. Robbins (Selma)	Democratic	March 4, 1899 – March 8, 1900	56th	Elected in 1898. Lost election contest.	
William F. Aldrich (Aldrich)	Republican	March 8, 1900 – March 3, 1901	56th	Successfully contested Robbins's 1898 election. Retired.	
Sydney J. Bowie (Anniston)	Democratic	March 4, 1901 – March 3, 1907	57th 58th 59th	Elected in 1900. Re-elected in 1902. Re-elected in 1904. Retired.	
William Benjamin Craig (Selma)	Democratic	March 4, 1907 – March 3, 1911	60th 61st	Elected in 1906. Re-elected in 1908. Retired.	
Fred L. Blackmon (Anniston)	Democratic	March 4, 1911 – February 8, 1921	62nd 63rd 64th 65th 66th	Elected in 1910. Re-elected in 1912. Re-elected in 1914. Re-elected in 1916. Re-elected in 1918. Re-elected in 1920 but died before that term began.	
Vacant		February 8, 1921 – June 7, 1921	66th 67th		
Lamar Jeffers (Anniston)	Democratic	June 7, 1921 – January 3, 1935	67th 68th 69th 70th 71st 72nd 73rd	Elected to finish Blackmon's term. Re-elected in 1922. Re-elected in 1924. Re-elected in 1926. Re-elected in 1928. Re-elected in 1930. Re-elected in 1932. Lost renomination.	
Sam Hobbs (Selma)	Democratic	January 3, 1935 – January 3, 1951	74th 75th 76th 77th 78th 79th 80th 81st	Elected in 1934. Re-elected in 1936. Re-elected in 1938. Re-elected in 1940. Re-elected in 1942. Re-elected in 1944. Re-elected in 1946. Re-elected in 1948. Retired.	
Kenneth A. Roberts (Anniston)	Democratic	January 3, 1951 – January 3, 1963	82nd 83rd 84th 85th 86th 87th	Elected in 1950. Re-elected in 1952. Re-elected in 1954. Re-elected in 1956. Re-elected in 1958. Re-elected in 1960. Redistricted to the at-large district.	
District inactive		January 3, 1963 – January 3, 1965	88th	All representatives elected at-large on a general ticket.	
Glenn Andrews (Anniston)	Republican	January 3, 1965 – January 3, 1967	89th	Elected in 1964. Lost re-election.	
Bill Nichols (Sylacauga)	Democratic	January 3, 1967 – January 3, 1973	90th 91st 92nd	Elected in 1966. Re-elected in 1968. Re-elected in 1970. Redistricted to the 3rd district.	
Tom Bevill (Jasper)	Democratic	January 3, 1973 – January 3, 1997	93rd 94th 95th 96th 97th 98th 99th 100th 101st 102nd 103rd 104th	Redistricted from the 7th district and re-elected in 1972. Re-elected in 1974. Re-elected in 1976. Re-elected in 1978. Re-elected in 1980. Re-elected in 1982. Re-elected in 1984. Re-elected in 1986. Re-elected in 1988. Re-elected in 1990. Re-elected in 1992. Re-elected in 1994. Retired.	1973–1983 [data missing]
Tom Bevill (Jasper)	Democratic	January 3, 1973 – January 3, 1997	93rd 94th 95th 96th 97th 98th 99th 100th 101st 102nd 103rd 104th	Redistricted from the 7th district and re-elected in 1972. Re-elected in 1974. Re-elected in 1976. Re-elected in 1978. Re-elected in 1980. Re-elected in 1982. Re-elected in 1984. Re-elected in 1986. Re-elected in 1988. Re-elected in 1990. Re-elected in 1992. Re-elected in 1994. Retired.	1983–1993 [data missing]
Tom Bevill (Jasper)	Democratic	January 3, 1973 – January 3, 1997	93rd 94th 95th 96th 97th 98th 99th 100th 101st 102nd 103rd 104th	Redistricted from the 7th district and re-elected in 1972. Re-elected in 1974. Re-elected in 1976. Re-elected in 1978. Re-elected in 1980. Re-elected in 1982. Re-elected in 1984. Re-elected in 1986. Re-elected in 1988. Re-elected in 1990. Re-elected in 1992. Re-elected in 1994. Retired.	1993–2003 [data missing]
Robert Aderholt (Haleyville)	Republican	January 3, 1997 – present	105th 106th 107th 108th 109th 110th 111th 112th 113th 114th 115th 116th 117th 118th 119th	Elected in 1996. Re-elected in 1998. Re-elected in 2000. Re-elected in 2002. Re-elected in 2004. Re-elected in 2006. Re-elected in 2008. Re-elected in 2010. Re-elected in 2012. Re-elected in 2014. Re-elected in 2016. Re-elected in 2018. Re-elected in 2020. Re-elected in 2022. Re-elected in 2024. Re-elected in 2026.	1993–2003 [data missing]
Robert Aderholt (Haleyville)	Republican	January 3, 1997 – present	105th 106th 107th 108th 109th 110th 111th 112th 113th 114th 115th 116th 117th 118th 119th	Elected in 1996. Re-elected in 1998. Re-elected in 2000. Re-elected in 2002. Re-elected in 2004. Re-elected in 2006. Re-elected in 2008. Re-elected in 2010. Re-elected in 2012. Re-elected in 2014. Re-elected in 2016. Re-elected in 2018. Re-elected in 2020. Re-elected in 2022. Re-elected in 2024. Re-elected in 2026.	2003–2013
Robert Aderholt (Haleyville)	Republican	January 3, 1997 – present	105th 106th 107th 108th 109th 110th 111th 112th 113th 114th 115th 116th 117th 118th 119th	Elected in 1996. Re-elected in 1998. Re-elected in 2000. Re-elected in 2002. Re-elected in 2004. Re-elected in 2006. Re-elected in 2008. Re-elected in 2010. Re-elected in 2012. Re-elected in 2014. Re-elected in 2016. Re-elected in 2018. Re-elected in 2020. Re-elected in 2022. Re-elected in 2024. Re-elected in 2026.	2013–2023
Robert Aderholt (Haleyville)	Republican	January 3, 1997 – present	105th 106th 107th 108th 109th 110th 111th 112th 113th 114th 115th 116th 117th 118th 119th	Elected in 1996. Re-elected in 1998. Re-elected in 2000. Re-elected in 2002. Re-elected in 2004. Re-elected in 2006. Re-elected in 2008. Re-elected in 2010. Re-elected in 2012. Re-elected in 2014. Re-elected in 2016. Re-elected in 2018. Re-elected in 2020. Re-elected in 2022. Re-elected in 2024. Re-elected in 2026.	2023–2025
Robert Aderholt (Haleyville)	Republican	January 3, 1997 – present	105th 106th 107th 108th 109th 110th 111th 112th 113th 114th 115th 116th 117th 118th 119th	Elected in 1996. Re-elected in 1998. Re-elected in 2000. Re-elected in 2002. Re-elected in 2004. Re-elected in 2006. Re-elected in 2008. Re-elected in 2010. Re-elected in 2012. Re-elected in 2014. Re-elected in 2016. Re-elected in 2018. Re-elected in 2020. Re-elected in 2022. Re-elected in 2024. Re-elected in 2026.	2025–present

== Recent election results ==
These are the results from the previous twelve election cycles in Alabama's 4th district.

=== 2002 ===
2002 Alabama's 4th congressional district election
Party	Candidate	Votes	%
Republican	Robert Aderholt (incumbent)	139,705	86.72
Libertarian	Tony H. McLendon	20,858	12.95
Write-in		538	0.33
Total votes		161,101	100.00
Republican hold			

=== 2004 ===
2004 Alabama's 4th congressional district election
Party	Candidate	Votes	%
Republican	Robert Aderholt (incumbent)	191,110	74.73
Democratic	Carl Cole	64,278	25.14
Write-in		336	0.13
Total votes		255,724	100.00
Republican hold			

=== 2006 ===
2006 Alabama's 4th congressional district election
Party	Candidate	Votes	%
Republican	Robert Aderholt (incumbent)	128,484	70.18
Democratic	Barbara Bobo	54,382	29.71
Write-in		206	0.11
Total votes		183,072	100.00
Republican hold			

=== 2008 ===
2008 Alabama's 4th congressional district election
Party	Candidate	Votes	%
Republican	Robert Aderholt (incumbent)	196,741	74.76
Democratic	Nicholas B. Sparks	66,077	25.11
Write-in		349	0.13
Total votes		263,167	100.00
Republican hold			

=== 2010 ===
2010 Alabama's 4th congressional district election
Party	Candidate	Votes	%
Republican	Robert Aderholt (incumbent)	167,714	98.82
Write-in		2,007	1.18
Total votes		169,721	100.00
Republican hold			

=== 2012 ===
2012 Alabama's 4th congressional district election
Party	Candidate	Votes	%
Republican	Robert Aderholt (incumbent)	199,071	73.97
Democratic	Daniel Boman	69,706	25.90
Write-in		341	0.13
Total votes		269,118	100.00
Republican hold			

=== 2014 ===
2014 Alabama's 4th congressional district election
Party	Candidate	Votes	%
Republican	Robert Aderholt (incumbent)	132,831	98.57
Write-in		1,921	1.43
Total votes		134,752	100.00
Republican hold			

=== 2016 ===
2016 Alabama's 4th congressional district election
Party	Candidate	Votes	%
Republican	Robert Aderholt (incumbent)	235,925	98.53
Write-in		3,519	1.47
Total votes		239,444	100.00
Republican hold			

=== 2018 ===
2018 Alabama's 4th congressional district election
Party	Candidate	Votes	%
Republican	Robert Aderholt (incumbent)	184,255	79.78
Democratic	Lee Auman	46,492	20.13
Write-in		222	0.10
Total votes		230,969	100.00
Republican hold			

=== 2020 ===
2020 Alabama's 4th congressional district election
Party	Candidate	Votes	%
Republican	Robert Aderholt (incumbent)	261,553	82.24
Democratic	Rick Neighbors	56,237	17.68
Write-in		239	0.08
Total votes		318,029	100.00
Republican hold			

=== 2022 ===
2022 Alabama's 4th congressional district election
Party	Candidate	Votes	%
Republican	Robert Aderholt (incumbent)	164,655	84.20
Democratic	Rick Neighbors	26,694	13.60
Libertarian	Johnny Cochran	4,303	2.20
Total votes		195,652	100.00
Republican hold			

=== 2024 ===
2024 Alabama's 4th congressional district election
Party	Candidate	Votes	%
Republican	Robert Aderholt (incumbent)	274,498	98.79
Write-in		3,374	1.21
Total votes		277,872	100.00
Republican hold			

== See also ==
- Alabama's congressional districts
- List of United States congressional districts
