= Louis W. Turpin =

American politician (1849–1903)

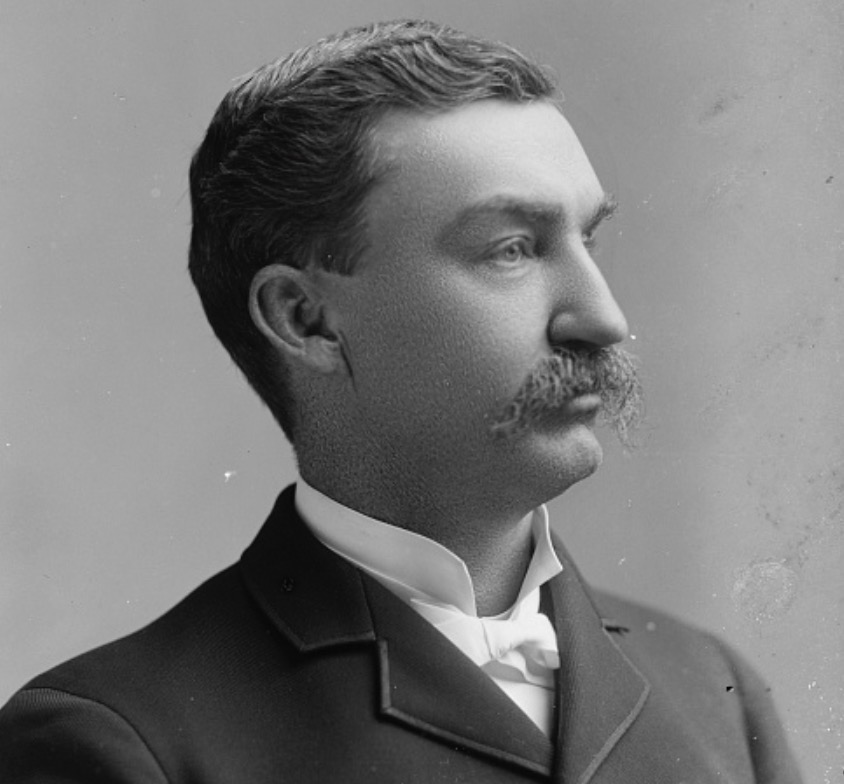
- Portrait of Turpin by Charles Milton Bell, taken between 1873 and 1890

Member of the U.S. House of Representatives from Alabama
- In office Unseated; March 4, 1889 – June 4, 1890
- Preceded by: Alexander C. Davidson
- Succeeded by: J. V. McDuffie
- Constituency: 4th (1889–1893); 9th (1893–1895)
- In office March 4, 1891 – March 3, 1895
- Preceded by: J. V. McDuffie
- Succeeded by: Gaston A. Robbins (4th); Oscar Underwood (9th)

Personal details
- Born: Louis Washington Turpin; February 22, 1849 Charlottesville, Virginia
- Died: February 3, 1903 (aged 53) Greensboro, Alabama
- Party: Democratic

Louis Washington Turpin (February 22, 1849 – February 3, 1903) was an American politician. A Democrat, he was a member of the United States House of Representatives from Alabama.

Born in Charlottesville, Virginia, Turpin was orphaned as a child, moving to Perry County, Alabama. He worked as a farmer. He served in the House from 1889 to 1890, and again from 1891 to 1895. He spent his first term unseated.

== Early life ==
Turpin was born on February 22, 1849, in Charlottesville, Virginia, the youngest of eight children born to hotel manager George William Turpin and Malinda Bennett (née Dickerson) Turpin. At age nine, his parents died, and in 1858, he and a sister moved to Perry County, Alabama. From around 1860, he was raised by planter Asbury Hayne de Yampert. He was self-educated. He lived in Newbern and worked as a farmer.

== Career ==
Turpin was a Democrat, a Bourbon Democrat. For six years, he was chairman of the Hale County Democratic Committee. From 1873 to 1880, he was tax assessor of Hale County. He lost the primaries for the election of the 48th United States Congress.

Following the tenure of Alexander C. Davidson, Turpin was elected to the United States House of Representatives. However, he was not seated due to a Republican majority in Congress. He served from March 4, 1889, to June 4, 1890, representing Alabama's 4th district. Following the tenure of J. V. McDuffie, he was re-elected to the House, serving as a full member, from March 4, 1891, to March 3, 1895. In 1893, he was redistricted to Alabama's 9th, which he represented for the remainder of his tenure.

While serving, Turpin was a member of the Committiees on Indian Affairs, on Post Office and Post Roads, and on Patents. He lost the primaries to the following election to Oscar Underwood. Underwood was so popular that Turpin gave up in the primaries, being drunk at a political convention appearance. Politically, he was liberal.

Turpin retired from politics in 1895. He retired due to his Congressional defeat, though some newspapers claimed it was because of his worsening eyesight. He afterward returned to farming, owning several plantations.

== Personal life and death ==
On July 28, 1870, Turpin married Sarah Archer Christian, with whom he had four children. He died on February 3, 1903, aged 53, in Greensboro, from Bright's disease. He was buried at Greensboro Cemetery.

U.S. House of Representatives
Preceded by Alexander C. Davidson	Member of the U.S. House of Representatives from Alabama's 4th congressional district March 4, 1889 - June 4, 1890	Succeeded by John Van McDuffie
Preceded by John Van McDuffie	Member of the U.S. House of Representatives from Alabama's 4th congressional district March 4, 1891 - March 3, 1893	Succeeded by Gaston A. Robbins
Preceded by District created	Member of the U.S. House of Representatives from Alabama's 9th congressional district March 4, 1893 - March 3, 1895	Succeeded by Oscar W. Underwood
