= Sydney J. Bowie =

American politician (1865–1928)

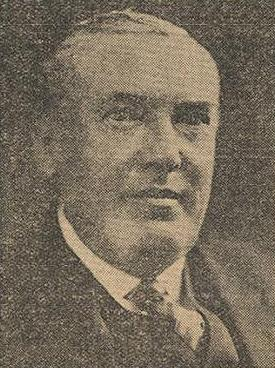
- Congressman Sydney J Bowie

Member of the U.S. House of Representatives from Alabama's 4th district
- In office March 4, 1901 – March 3, 1907
- Preceded by: William F. Aldrich
- Succeeded by: William B. Craig

Personal details
- Born: Sydney Johnston Bowie; July 26, 1865 Talladega, Alabama
- Died: May 7, 1928 (aged 62) Talladega, Alabama
- Party: Democratic

Sydney Johnston Bowie (July 26, 1865 – May 7, 1928) was a U.S. representative from Alabama, nephew of Franklin Welsh Bowdon.

Born in Talladega, Alabama, Bowie attended private schools, and was graduated from the law department of the University of Alabama at Tuscaloosa in 1885. He was admitted to the bar June 1, 1885, and commenced practice in Talladega, Alabama. City clerk of Talladega in 1885 and 1886. He served as member of the board of aldermen in 1891. He served as member of the Democratic State executive committee in 1894–1899. He moved to Anniston, Alabama, in 1899.

Bowie was elected as a Democrat to the Fifty-seventh, Fifty-eighth, and Fifty-ninth Congresses (March 4, 1901 – March 3, 1907). He declined to be a candidate for renomination in 1906 and moved to Birmingham and continued the practice of law until 1919, when he engaged in business there as an automobile dealer. Bowie served as member of the Southern Education Board in 1908 and 1909. He served as member of the Birmingham Board of Education in 1915–1919, chairman of the State educational commission in 1920, delegate at large to the Democratic National Convention in 1920, president of the Alabama Tuberculosis Commission in 1920–1922, a member of the State harbor commission in 1922 and 1923. He died in Birmingham, Alabama, May 7, 1928. His interment occurred in Birmingham's Elmwood Cemetery.

U.S. House of Representatives
Preceded by William F. Aldrich	Member of the U.S. House of Representatives from Alabama's 4th congressional district 1901–1907	Succeeded by William B. Craig
