= Josephine Cables Aldrich =

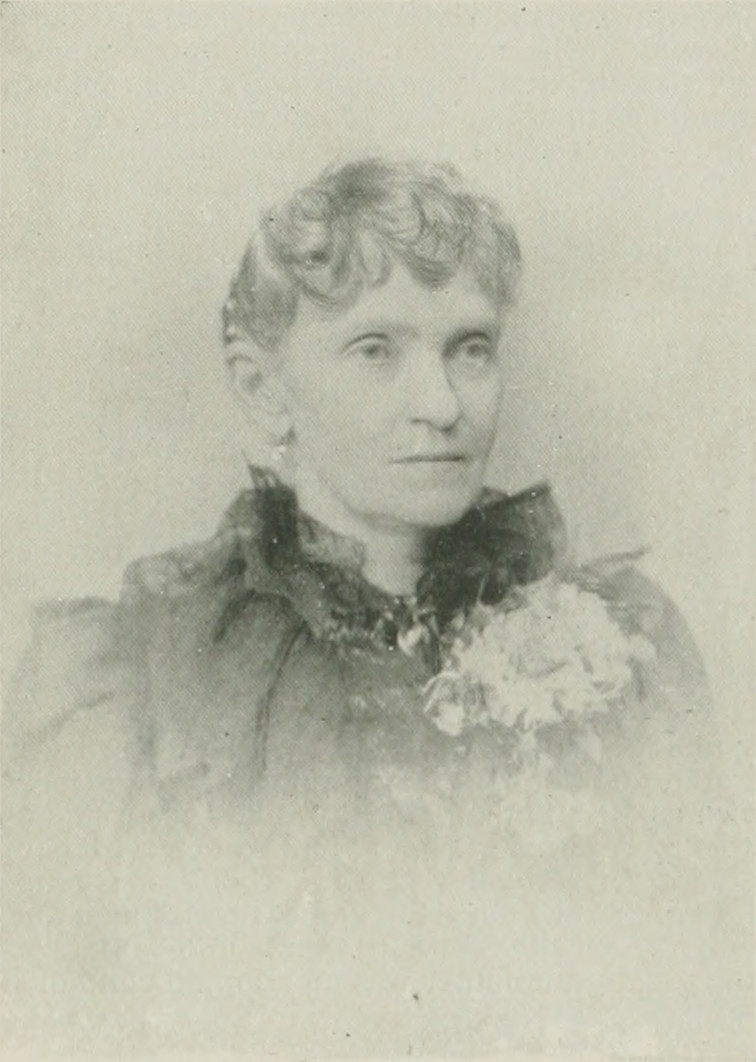
Josephine Cables Aldrich

Josephine Cables Aldrich (June 12, 1843 – August 12, 1917) was an American spiritualist, Theosophist, editor, and publisher from the U.S. state of Connecticut. Married to the politician, William F. Aldrich, she was the editor of The Occult World and the publisher of Matilda Joslyn Gage's The Liberal Thinker. She was a co-founder of the Woman's National University and School of Useful and Ornamental Arts.

== Biography ==
Josephine Cables was born in Litchfield, Connecticut. Her mother died when she was young, leaving her in the care of two Puritan grandmothers. They believed that free use of the rod was necessary to save the child's soul from destruction. This severe treatment taught her that the Golden Rule was by far the best maxim for morality and happiness, and no sooner was she in control of a home of her own in Rochester, New York, than she began to teach the same, turning her home into a sort of Mecca for advance thinkers, not only in the US, but pilgrims came from Europe, Asia and Africa to confer with her.

In 1882, in Rochester, she began publishing "The Occult World", a paper devoted to advanced thought and reform work. Her editorials focused on liberality, justice and mercy. She was at one time secretary of the Theosophical Society of the U.S., and president of the Rochester Brotherhood. She lived an affluent lifestyle in Aldrich, Alabama, a mining town named for her husband, William Aldrich, whom she married April 16, 1889. He supported his wife in all her work, and she, in turn, assisted him to carry out a plan of his, whereby persons accused of crime were defended before the court, at the public expense. She served as vice-president of the Woman's National Industrial League, and was one of the founders of the Woman's National University and School of Useful and Ornamental Arts. Aldrich (vice-president) was one of the four initial officers of the newly-established Woman's National Liberal Union, which included Matilda Joslyn Gage (president), Mary Emily Bates Coues (secretary), and Aldrich's husband, William (treasurer).

There were two adopted children in the family: Farrington, who died at age 19, and Josephine, who married Dr. Farley Winfield Harris. Aldrich died in 1917 in Birmingham, Alabama, and is buried at Rock Creek Cemetery, Washington D.C.
