= Hezekiah Joslyn =

American physician and abolitionist (1797-1865)

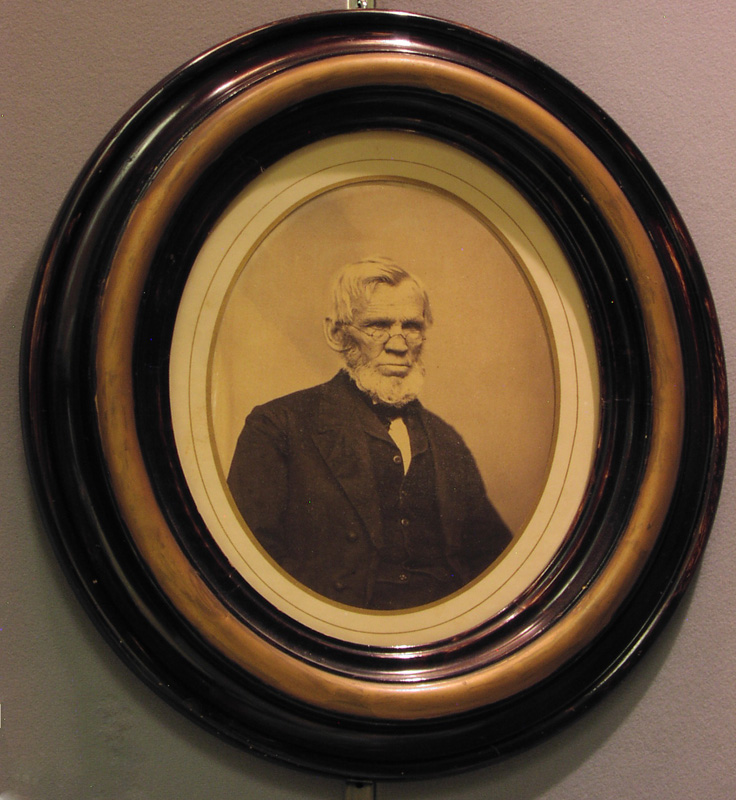
- Born: 1797; Cicero, New York, U.S.
- Died: October 1865 (aged 67–68); Fayetteville, New York
- Occupation: Physician
- Known for: Abolitionist activity
- Children: Matilda Joslyn Gage
- Relatives: Maud Gage Baum (granddaughter); L. Frank Baum (grandson-in-law)

Hezekiah Joslyn (1797 – October 30, 1865) was an American medical doctor and abolitionist.

Joslyn homesteaded at what is today (2020) 8560 Brewerton Rd. in Cicero, New York. The homestead is now considered a potential archaeological site. He was an Onondaga County, New York, doctor after 1823 and in 1865 an officer in the county medical society.

Joslyn was a founding member of the Liberty Party, an early advocate of abolitionism founded in the 1840s. His daughter Matilda Joslyn Gage was a suffragist as well as a prominent abolitionist. Their home in Fayetteville, New York, where Hezekiah died, was a station on the Underground Railroad. His tombstone near his former home in Cicero reads "AN EARLY ABOLITIONIST".

Hezekiah's daughter Matilda was mother-in-law of L. Frank Baum, author of The Wonderful Wizard of Oz.
