= Gaston A. Robbins =

American politician and lawyer (1858–1903)

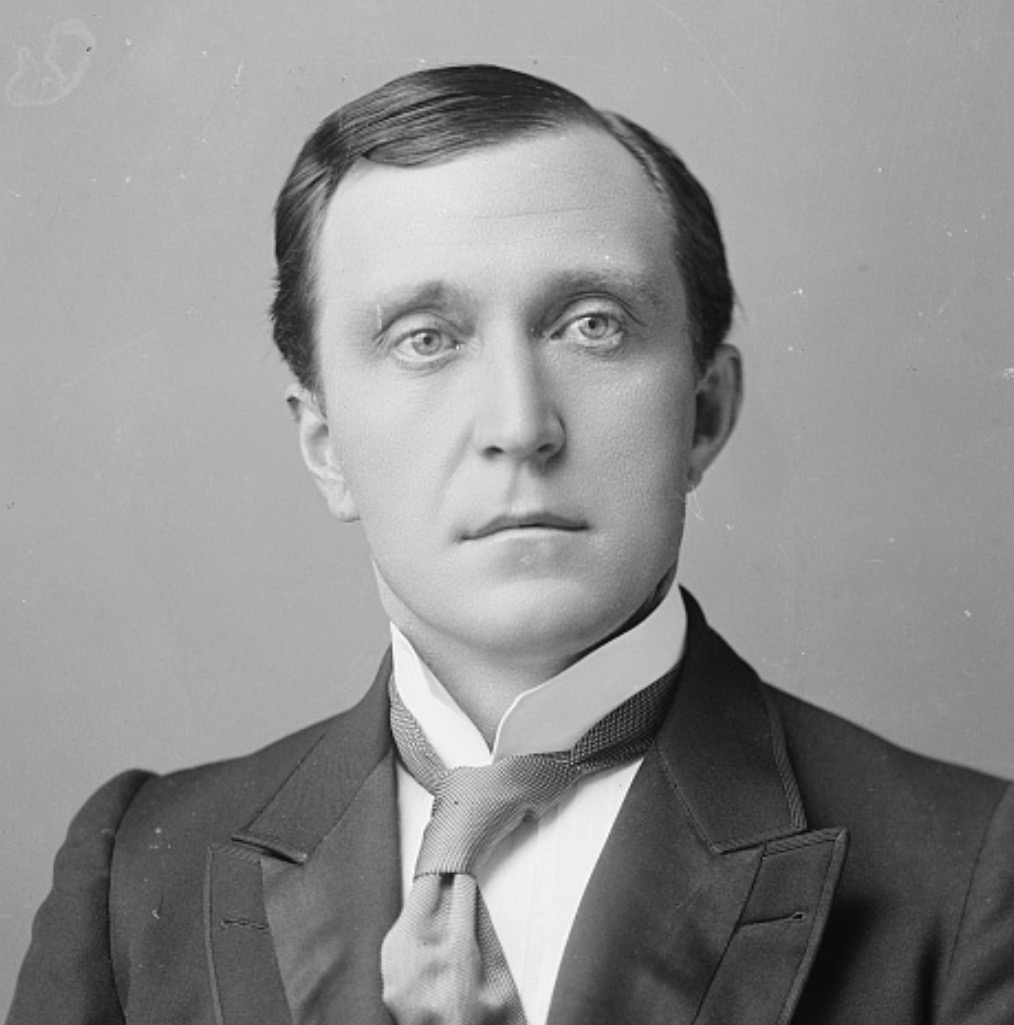
- Portrait of Robbins by Charles Milton Bell, taken between January 1891 and January 1894

Member of the U.S. House of Representatives from Alabama's 4th district
- In office March 4, 1893 – March 13, 1896 (seated March 4, 1895)
- Preceded by: Louis Washington Turpin
- Succeeded by: William F. Aldrich
- In office March 4, 1899 – March 8, 1900
- Preceded by: William F. Aldrich
- Succeeded by: William F. Aldrich

Personal details
- Born: Gaston Ahi Robbins; September 26, 1858 Goldsboro, North Carolina, US
- Died: February 22, 1902 (aged 43) Manhattan, New York City, US
- Party: Democratic
- Relations: William M. Robbins (uncle); Lucius Quintus Cincinnatus Lamar I (cousin); Mirabeau B. Lamar (cousin); Lucius Quintus Cincinnatus Lamar (cousin); Joseph Rucker Lamar (cousin); Henry Alford
- Occupation: Politician, lawyer

Gaston Ahi Robbins (erroneously Gaston Alexander Robbins; September 26, 1858 – February 22, 1902) was an American politician and lawyer. A Democrat, he was a member of the United States House of Representatives from Alabama.

Born in Goldsboro, North Carolina, Robbins graduated from the University of North Carolina at Chapel Hill. Beginning in 1880, he practiced law. He served in the House from 1893 to 1896, and again from 1899 to 1900, both times being unseated. He died in a hotel fire in New York City.

== Early life ==
Robbins was born on September 26, 1858, in Goldsboro, North Carolina, the son of Julius Alexander Robbins and author Mrs. Alford. Thomas William Herringshaw erroneously claims he was born in Alabama.

Robbins was the nephew of William M. Robbins, the third cousin twice removed of Lucius Quintus Cincinnatus Lamar I and Mirabeau B. Lamar, and the fourth cousin once removed of Lucius Quintus Cincinnatus Lamar and Joseph Rucker Lamar. Through his mother, he was descendent of Henry Alford.

Robbins later moved to Randolph County. He studied at Trinity College and the University of North Carolina at Chapel Hill, attending the latter from 1877 to 1879. He read law under Robert P. Dick and John H. Dillard, being admitted to the bar in 1880, after which he commenced practice in Selma, Alabama. In 1881, he became editor of the Southern Argus newspaper.

== Politics ==
Robbins was a Democrat. He was a Presidential elector in the 1884 election, as which he voted for Grover Cleveland and Thomas A. Hendricks. He served in the United States House of Representatives from March 4, 1893, to March 13, 1896, though was not seated until March 4, 1895. He served a second, nonconsecutive term, from March 4, 1899, to March 8, 1900. Both times he was unseated by the majority Republican Congress, then defeated by William F. Aldrich in the election. While in Congress, he pushed for construction of a railroad from Selma to Pensacola, Florida. Politically, he was liberal.

== Personal life and death ==
Around 1901, Robbins moved to New York City to practice law. He married once, to Mrs. Alexander, who died within ten days after their wedding. He was a member of the Freemasons.

Robbins died on February 22, 1902, aged 43, after jumping six stories from a burning hotel on Park Avenue, Manhattan. Though, a newspaper claims he suffocated in a hallway. A newspaper claims that he died while attempting to save some women inside the hotel. Herringshaw erroneously claims he died in Selma. He was buried at Oakwood Cemetery, in Statesville, North Carolina. An archive of his papers is held by the University of North Carolina at Chapel Hill.

U.S. House of Representatives
Preceded by Louis W. Turpin	Member of the U.S. House of Representatives from Alabama's 4th congressional district March 4, 1893 - March 13, 1896	Succeeded by William F. Aldrich
Preceded by William F. Aldrich	Member of the U.S. House of Representatives from Alabama's 4th congressional district March 4, 1899 - March 8, 1900	Succeeded by William F. Aldrich
