= Matilda Joslyn Gage =

American abolitionist, author (1826–1898)

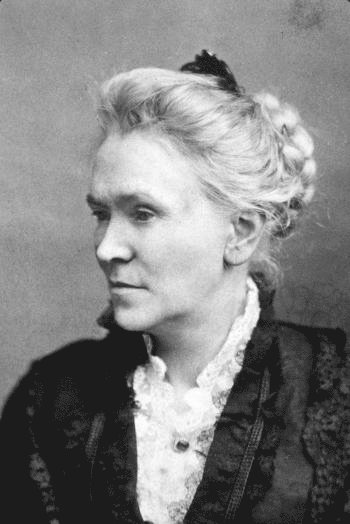
- "A Woman of the Century"
- Born: Matilda Electa Joslyn; March 24, 1826; Cicero, New York, U.S.
- Died: March 18, 1898 (aged 71); Chicago, Illinois, U.S.
- Occupations: Feminist, Abolitionist, free thinker, author
- Spouse: Henry Hill Gage (m. 1845; died 1884)
- Children: 5, including Maud
- Parent: Hezekiah Joslyn (father)
- Relatives: L. Frank Baum (son-in-law)
- Writing career
- Notable works: Author, with Anthony and Stanton, of first three volumes of History of Woman Suffrage

Signature
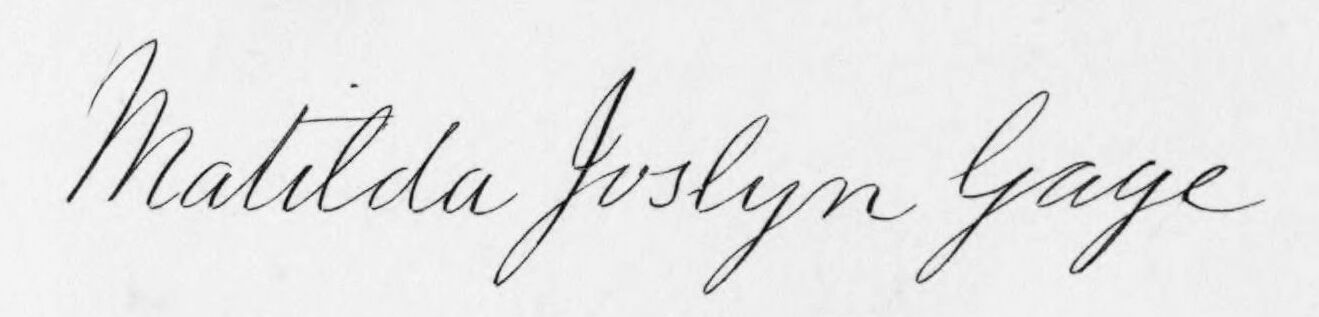

Matilda Joslyn Gage (née Joslyn; March 24, 1826 – March 18, 1898) was an American writer and activist. She is mainly known for her contributions to women's suffrage in the United States, but also campaigned for Native American rights, abolitionism, and freethought. She is the eponym for the Matilda effect, which describes the tendency to deny women credit for scientific invention. She influenced her son-in-law L. Frank Baum, the author of The Wonderful Wizard of Oz.

She was the youngest speaker at the 1852 National Women's Rights Convention held in Syracuse, New York. Along with Susan B. Anthony and Elizabeth Cady Stanton, Gage helped found the National Woman's Suffrage Association in 1869. During 1878–1881, she published and edited the National Citizen, a paper devoted to the cause of women. With Elizabeth Cady Stanton and Susan B. Anthony, she was for years in the forefront of the suffrage movement, and collaborated with them in writing the first three volumes of History of Woman Suffrage (1881–1887). She was the author of the Woman's Rights Catechism (1868); Woman as Inventor (1870); Who Planned the Tennessee Campaign (1880); and Woman, Church and State (1893).

For many years, she was associated with the National Woman Suffrage Association, but when her views on suffrage and feminism became too radical for many of its members, she founded the Woman's National Liberal Union, whose objects were: To assert woman's natural right to self-government; to show the cause of delay in the recognition of her demand; to preserve the principles of civil and religious liberty; to arouse public opinion to the danger of a union of church and state through an amendment to the constitution, and to denounce the doctrine of woman's inferiority. She served as president of this union from its inception in 1890 until her death in Chicago in 1898.

== Family background and education ==
Matilda Electa Joslyn was born in Cicero, New York, March 24, 1826. Her parents were Dr. Hezekiah and Helen (Leslie) Joslyn. Her father, of New England and revolutionary ancestry, was a liberal thinker and an early abolitionist. From her mother, who was a member of the Leslie family of Scotland, Gage inherited her fondness for historic research. Their home was a station of the Underground Railroad, a place of safety for escaped slaves.

Her early education was received from her parents, and the intellectual atmosphere of her home had an influence on her career. She attended Clinton Liberal Institute, in Clinton, Oneida County, New York.

== Marriage and early activism ==
On January 6, 1845, at the age of 18, she married Henry H. Gage, a merchant of Cicero, making their permanent home at Fayetteville, New York. She faced prison for her actions associated with the Underground Railroad under the Fugitive Slave Law of 1850, which criminalized assistance to escaped slaves. Gage became involved in the women's rights movement in 1852 when she decided to speak at the National Women's Rights Convention in Syracuse, New York.

== Writer and editor ==
=== Newspapers ===
Gage was well-educated and a prolific writer—the most gifted and educated woman of her age, claimed her devoted son-in-law, L. Frank Baum. She corresponded with numerous newspapers, reporting on developments in the woman suffrage movement. In 1878, she bought the Ballot Box, the monthly journal of a Toledo, Ohio, suffrage association, when its editor, Sarah R. L. Williams, decided to retire. Gage turned it into The National Citizen and Ballot Box, explaining her intentions for the paper thus:

Its especial object will be to secure national protection to women citizens in the exercise of their rights to vote ... it will oppose Class Legislation of whatever form ... Women of every class, condition, rank and name will find this paper their friend.

— Matilda Joslyn Gage, "Prospectus"

Gage became its primary editor for the next three years (until 1881), writing and publishing essays on a wide range of issues. Each edition bore the words 'The Pen Is Mightier Than The Sword', and included regular columns about prominent women in history and female inventors. Gage wrote clearly, logically, and often with a dry wit and a well-honed sense of irony. Writing about laws which allowed a man to will his children to a guardian unrelated to their mother, Gage observed:

It is sometimes better to be a dead man than a live woman.

— Matilda Joslyn Gage, "All The Rights I Want"

=== Women inventors ===
In 1870, Gage published a pamphlet called Woman as an Inventor. The pamphlet was described as 'Woman Suffrage Tracts – No. 1' and was published by the New York State Woman Suffrage Association, which Gage helped to found. In 1883, Gage published a similar essay called Woman as an Inventor in the North American Review. In both pamphlets, Gage argued that women were already competent inventors and supported her argument by citing examples of women inventors.

Gage mentioned Sarah Mather, the inventor of the deep-sea telescope; Maggie Knight, who invented a machine that created satchel-bottom bags; Barbara Uthmann, who invented pillow lace; and Angelique du Coudray, who invented a stuffed mannequin to practice midwifery. Gage also cited goddesses like Minerva, Isis, Mama Ocllo, and Leizu as example of female inventiveness. Relying on the ideas of Diodorus Siculus, an ancient Greek historian, Gage believed that goddesses began as real women who were deified because of the benefit from their inventions. Gage argued that ancient Egypt was a matriarchal society, an idea which historians today disagree with.

Gage's most controversial claim was that Catherine Greene invented the cotton gin instead of Eli Whitney. Gage also argued that a woman was responsible for the Burden horse-shoe machine.

Gage also articulated the barriers to women becoming inventors and receiving patents. Gage argued that society disapproved of women who invent, prompting them to suppress their talents, not seek out mechanical education, and patent their inventions under the names of husbands or other men to avoid ridicule. Gage also criticized laws that limit women's control over the patents they received. In 1883, she wrote:

In not a single State of the Union is a married woman held to possess a right to her earnings within the family; and in not one-half of them has she a right to their control in business entered upon outside of the household. Should such a woman be successful in obtaining a patent, what then! Would she be free to do as she pleased with it? Not at all. She would hold no right, title, or power over this work of her own brain.

In response to the 1883 article, The New York Times published an article, saying Gage "squarely answered" the "common reproach with which ambitious women are met, that they possess no inventive or mechanical genius." Kara Swanson argues that Gage's efforts helped to change public opinion around women inventors, though they did not convince men that women should vote.

=== Woman, Church, and State ===
In 1893, Gage published Woman, Church, and State, a book that argued the church was responsible for women's oppression throughout history. Gage believed that the church's resistance to women's equality was foundational to other church beliefs and that the church gained power through influencing marriage and education laws. Like her pamphlets about inventions, in Woman, Church, and State Gage argues for the presence of an ancient matriarchy that disappeared because of Christianity.

Mary Corey argues that Gage's book is the only historical monograph written by a suffragist that proposes a thesis and supports it with evidence.

Gage's attack on the church was considered especially radical after the 1890 creation of the more conservative National American Woman Suffrage Association (NAWSA). The NAWSA officially repudiated Woman, Church, and State in 1913 and it was banned under the Comstock laws.

== Activism ==
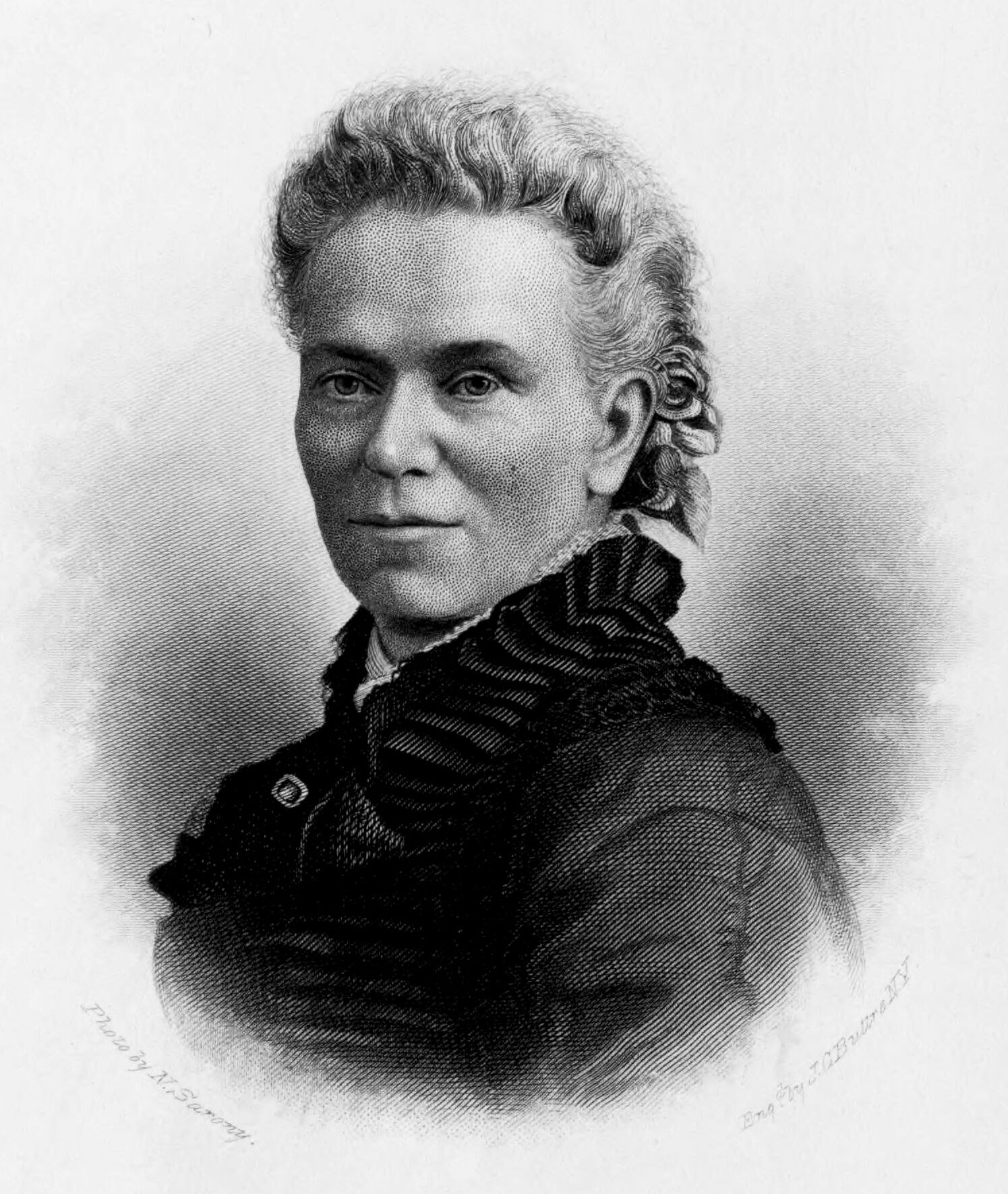
Engraving of Gage by John Chester Buttre after photo by Napoleon Sarony

Gage described herself as "born with a hatred of oppression."

=== Women's suffrage ===
Even though she was beset by both financial and physical (cardiac) problems throughout her life, her work for women's rights was extensive, practical, and often brilliantly executed. Gage was considered to be more radical than either Susan B. Anthony or Elizabeth Cady Stanton (with whom she wrote History of Woman Suffrage, and Declaration of the Rights of Women).

She served as president of the National Woman Suffrage Association (NWSA) from 1875 to 1876 and served as either Chair of the Executive Committee or Vice President for over twenty years. During the 1876 convention, she successfully argued against a group of police who claimed the association was holding an illegal assembly; they left without pressing charges. She was a delegate from the NWSA to the 1880 Republican National Convention, the 1880 Democratic National Convention and that of the Greenback Party. Gage also served as president of the New York State Suffrage Association for five years.

As a result of the campaigning of the New York State Woman Suffrage Association under Gage, the state allowed women to elect members of the school boards. Gage ensured that every woman in her area (Fayetteville, New York) had the opportunity to vote, by writing letters making them aware of their rights, and sitting at the polls making sure nobody was turned away. In 1871, Gage was part of a group of 10 women who attempted to vote. Reportedly, she stood by and argued with the polling officials on behalf of each individual woman. She supported Victoria Woodhull and (later) Ulysses S. Grant in the 1872 presidential election. In 1873 she defended Susan B. Anthony when Anthony was placed on trial for having voted in that election, making compelling legal and moral arguments. In 1884, Gage was an Elector-at-Large for Belva Lockwood and the Equal Rights Party.

Gage unsuccessfully tried to prevent the conservative takeover of the women's suffrage movement. Susan B. Anthony, who had helped to found the NWSA, was primarily concerned with gaining the vote, an outlook which Gage found too narrow. Conservative suffragists were drawn into the movement believing that women's vote would achieve temperance (the banning of alcohol) and Christian political goals, but not supporting more general social reform. This conservative wing of the movement was represented by the American Woman Suffrage Association (AWSA). The merger of the two organizations, pushed through by Lucy Stone, Alice Stone Blackwell and Anthony, produced the National American Woman Suffrage Association (NAWSA) in 1890.

Stanton and Gage maintained their radical positions and opposed this merger, because they believed it was a threat to separation of church and state. That year, Gage established the Woman's National Liberal Union (WNLU), of which she was president until her death in 1898, and editor of its official journal, The Liberal Thinker; the other initial officers were Josephine Cables Aldrich, vice-president; Mary Emily Bates Coues, secretary; and William F. Aldrich, treasurer. The WNLU became the platform for radical and liberal ideas of the time.

=== Religion ===
Along with Stanton, she was a vocal critic of the Christian Church, which put her at odds with conservative suffragists such as Frances Willard and the Woman's Christian Temperance Union. Rather than arguing that women deserved the vote because their feminine morality would then properly influence legislation (as the WCTU did), she argued that they deserved suffrage as a 'natural right'. Despite her opposition to the Church, Gage was in her own way deeply religious, and she joined Stanton's Revising Committee to write The Woman's Bible.

Gage was an avid opponent of the Christian church as controlled by men, having analyzed centuries of Christian practices as degrading and oppressive to women. She saw the Christian church as central to the process of men subjugating women, a process in which church doctrine and authority were used to portray women as morally inferior and inherently sinful (see Biblical patriarchy). She strongly supported the separation of church and state, believing "that the greatest injury to women arose from theological laws that subjugated woman to man." She wrote in October 1881:

Believing this country to be a political and not a religious organisation ... the editor of the National Citizen will use all her influence of voice and pen against "Sabbath Laws", the uses of the "Bible in School", and pre-eminently against an amendment which shall introduce "God in the Constitution"

— God in the Constitution, page 2

In 1893, she published Woman, Church and State, a book that outlined the variety of ways in which Christianity had oppressed women and reinforced patriarchal systems. It was wide-ranging and built extensively upon arguments and ideas she had previously put forth in speeches (and in a chapter of History of Woman Suffrage which bore the same name). Gage became a Theosophist, and the last two years of her life, her thoughts were concentrated upon metaphysical subjects, and the phenomena and philosophy of Spiritualism and Theosophical studies. During her critical illness in 1896, she experienced some illuminations that intensified her interest in psychical research. She had great interest in the occult mysteries of Theosophy and other Eastern speculations as to reincarnation and the illimitable creative power of humanity.

=== Witch trials ===
Gage also strongly criticized the witch hunts that took place throughout the 1600s, interpreting them as a church-supported means of dominating and intentionally killing women. Gage uses her book Woman, Church & State: The Original Exposé of Male Collaboration Against the Female Sex to highlight the connections between the church's core beliefs, restriction of women by both the church and state, and the extremes of the witch trials. She highlights this connection by arguing that one is able to understand the oppression of women that stemmed from the church on a deeper level if the term women is substituted for witches. Gage also asserted that educated women who opposed the patriarchy were viewed as a threat to the church and thus more likely to be accused of witchcraft. In 1893, she wrote:

The witch was in reality the profoundest thinker, the most advanced scientist of those ages. The persecution which for ages waged against witches was in reality an attack upon science at the hands of the church. As knowledge has ever been power, the church feared its use in woman's hands, and leveled its deadliest blows at her.

— Woman, Church and State, p. 105

Gage also advocated against ageism, claiming that elderly women deserve the Christian Church to be held accountable for the extreme violence they faced throughout the seventeenth century. Gage used exaggerated numbers to further her arguments that older women were so commonly accused of witchcraft that they did not receive the affection and attentiveness they merit, instead implying that those accused were subject to a life of humiliation and tribulation, making it rare for an elderly woman to die of old age. Although not historically accurate with numbers in her assertions, Gage used her interpretations of the witch hunts to denounce the Christian Church's treatment of women and advocated for justice.

=== Abortion ===
Like many other suffragists, Gage considered abortion a regrettable tragedy, although her views on the subject were more complex than simple opposition. In 1868, she wrote a letter to The Revolution (a women's rights paper edited by Elizabeth Cady Stanton and Parker Pillsbury), supporting the view that abortion was an institution supported, dominated and furthered by men. Gage opposed abortion on principle, blaming it on the "selfish desire" of husbands to maintain their wealth by reducing their offspring:

The short article on "Child Murder" in your paper of March 12 that touched a subject which lies deeper down in woman's wrongs than any other. This is the denial of the right to herself ... nowhere has the marital union of the sexes been one in which woman has had control over her own body. Enforced motherhood is a crime against the body of the mother and the soul of the child. ... But the crime of abortion is not one in which the guilt lies solely or even chiefly with the woman. ... I hesitate not to assert that most of this crime of "child murder", "abortion", "infanticide", lies at the door of the male sex. Many a woman has laughed a silent, derisive laugh at the decisions of eminent medical and legal authorities, in cases of crimes committed against her as a woman. Never, until she sits as juror on such trials, will or can just decisions be rendered.

— Matilda Joslyn Gage, Is Woman Her Own?

=== Divorce ===
Gage was quite concerned with the rights of a woman over her own life and body. In 1881 she wrote, on the subject of divorce:

When they preach as does Rev. Crummell, of 'the hidden mystery of generation, the wondrous secret of propagated life, committed to the trust of woman,' they bring up a self-evident fact of nature which needs no other inspiration, to show the world that the mother, and not the father, is the true head of the family, and that she should be able to free herself from the adulterous husband, keeping her own body a holy temple for its divine-human uses, of which as priestess and holder of the altar she alone should have control.

— Matilda Joslyn Gage, A Sermon Against Woman

Other feminists of the period referred to "voluntary motherhood," achieved through consensual nonprocreative sexual practices, periodic or permanent sexual abstinence, or (most importantly) the right of a woman (especially a wife) to refuse sex. (This was before the concept of marital rape had been codified in the United States.)

=== Native American rights ===
Gage was influenced by the works of Lewis Henry Morgan and Henry Rowe Schoolcraft about Native Americans in the United States, and used her speeches and writings to decry their brutal treatment. She was angered that the federal government attempted to impose citizenship upon them, thereby negating their status as a separate nation and their treaty privileges.

She wrote in 1878:

That the Indians have been oppressed – are now, is true, but the United States has treaties with them, recognising them as distinct political communities, and duty towards them demands not an enforced citizenship but a faithful living up to its obligations on the part of the government.

— Matilda Joslyn Gage, "Indian Citizenship"

In her 1893 work, Woman, Church and State, she cited the Iroquois society, among others, as a 'matriarchate' in which women had true power, noting that a system of descent through the female line (matrilineality) and female property rights led to a more equal relationship between men and women. Gage spent time among the Iroquois and received the name Karonienhawi – 'she who holds the sky' – upon her initiation into the Wolf Clan. She was admitted into the Iroquois Council of Matrons.

== Family ==
Gage, who lived at 210 E. Genesee St., Fayetteville, New York, for the majority of her life, had five children with her husband: Charles Henry (who died in infancy), Helen Leslie, Thomas Clarkson, Julia Louise, and Maud.

Maud, by ten years the youngest of the family, initially horrified her mother when she announced her intention to marry L. Frank Baum, then merely a struggling actor with only a handful of plays to his writing credit. However, a few minutes later, Gage started laughing, apparently realizing that her emphasis on all individuals making up their own minds was not lost on her headstrong daughter, who gave up a chance at a law career when such opportunities for women were rare. Gage spent six months of every year with Maud and Frank, who grew to respect her greatly; his best-known works, the series beginning with The Wonderful Wizard of Oz, are thought by scholars to show her political influence.

Gage's only son and his wife Sophia had a daughter named Dorothy Louise Gage, who was born in Bloomington, Illinois, on June 11, 1898. The baby's aunt Maud, who had longed for a daughter, doted on her. The infant died in November, only five months old, and the death so upset Maud that she required medical attention. To honor his wife's grief, Baum named the protagonist of his next book Dorothy Gale. In 1996, Dr. Sally Roesch Wagner, a biographer of Matilda Joslyn Gage, located young Dorothy's grave in Bloomington. A memorial was erected in the child's memory at her gravesite on May 21, 1997. This child is often mistaken for her cousin of the same name, Dorothy Louise Gage (1883–1889), the daughter of Matilda Gage's eldest surviving child, Helen.

Gage died in the Baum home in Chicago in 1898. Although she was cremated, there is a memorial stone at Fayetteville Cemetery that bears her slogan "There is a word sweeter than Mother, Home or Heaven. That word is Liberty."

Her great-granddaughter was the U.S. Senator from North Dakota, Jocelyn Burdick.

== Legacy ==
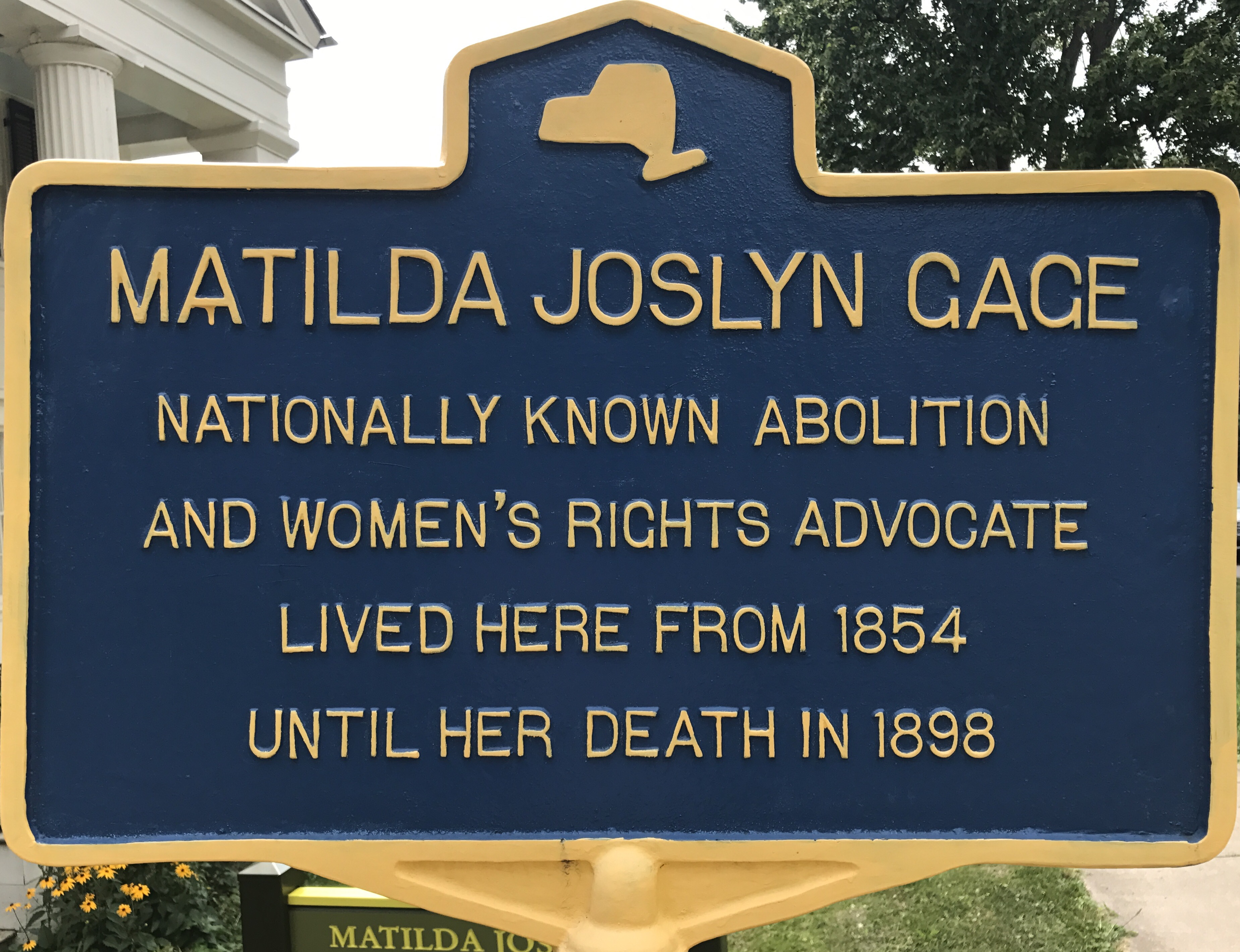
A plaque commemorating Matilda Joslyn Gage outside of the Gage home in Fayetteville

In the teleplay The Dreamer of Oz (1990), Matilda Gage is played by Rue McClanahan. Her interactions with son-in-law "Frank" are portrayed as more hostile than in reality.

In 1993, scientific historian Margaret W. Rossiter coined the term Matilda effect after Matilda Gage, to identify the social situation where woman scientists inaccurately receive less credit for their scientific work than an objective examination of their actual effort would reveal. The Matilda effect is the opposite of the Matthew effect, in which scientists already famous are over-credited with new discoveries. Gage's legacy was detailed in biographies published by Sally Roesch Wagner and Charlotte M. Shapiro.

In 1995, Gage was inducted into the National Women's Hall of Fame.

In 2022, a National Votes for Women Trail marker was unveiled in Saratoga Springs, to commemorate Gage and how she helped start the New York State Women Suffrage Association in Saratoga Springs.

A plaque commemorating Gage is outside of the Gage home in Fayetteville.

The Gage home in Fayetteville houses the Matilda Joslyn Gage Foundation, and is open to the public as a historic house museum.

== Selected works ==
Gage was editor of The National Citizen and Ballot Box (May 1878 – October 1881; available on microfilm) and as editor of The Liberal Thinker, from 1890 onwards. These publications offered her the opportunity to publish essays and opinion pieces. The following is a partial list.

- "Is Woman Her Own?", published in The Revolution, April 9, 1868, ed. Elizabeth Cady Stanton, Parker Pillsbury. pp 215–216.
- "Prospectus", published in The National Citizen and Ballot Box, ed. Matilda E. J. Gage. May 1878 p. 1.
- "Indian Citizenship", published in The National Citizen and Ballot Box, ed. Matilda E. J. Gage. May 1878 p. 2.
- "All The Rights I Want", published in The National Citizen and Ballot Box, ed. Matilda E. J. Gage. January 1879 p. 2.
- "A Sermon Against Woman", published in The National Citizen and Ballot Box, ed. Matilda E. J. Gage. September 1881 p. 2.
- "God in the Constitution", published in The National Citizen and Ballot Box, ed. Matilda E. J. Gage. October 1881 p. 2.
- "What the government exacts", published in The National Citizen and Ballot Box, ed. Matilda E. J. Gage. October 1881 p. 2.
- "Working women", published in The National Citizen and Ballot Box, ed. Matilda E. J. Gage. October 1881 p. 3.
- Woman As Inventor, 1870, Fayetteville, NY: F.A. Darling
- History of Woman Suffrage, 1881, Chapters by Cady Stanton, E., Anthony, S.B., Gage, M. E. J., Harper, I.H. (published again in 1985 by Salem NH: Ayer Company)
- The Aberdeen Saturday Pioneer, 14 and 21 March 1891, editor and editorials. It is possible she wrote some previous unsigned editorials, rather than L. Frank Baum, for whom she completed the paper's run.
- Woman, Church and State, 1893 (published again in 1980 by Watertowne MA: Persephone Press)
