= J. V. McDuffie =

American politician (1841–1896)

Member of the U.S. House of Representatives from Alabama's 4th district
- In office June 4, 1890 – March 3, 1891
- Preceded by: Louis Washington Turpin
- Succeeded by: Louis Washington Turpin

Personal details
- Born: John Van Patter McDuffie; May 16, 1841 Addison, New York
- Died: November 18, 1896 (aged 55) Hayneville, Alabama
- Party: Republican

John Van Patter McDuffie (May 16, 1841 – November 18, 1896) was a U.S. representative from Alabama.

Born in Addison, New York, McDuffie attended the common schools. He moved with his parents to Bureau County, Illinois, in 1855. He attended Luther College (Iowa). In July 1861, he enlisted in Company B, 2nd Iowa Cavalry and served through the American Civil War. He became a sergeant major. He settled in Lowndes County, Alabama, and became a planter. He studied law and was admitted to the bar and commenced practice in Hayneville, Alabama.

McDuffie was elected judge of probate in 1868. He was reelected in 1874 and served until 1880. He served as delegate to the Republican National Convention in 1872 and 1876. He was the 7th Chairman of the Alabama Republican Party assuming office in 1878. He was an unsuccessful Republican candidate for election in 1886 to the Fiftieth Congress. He successfully contested the election of Louis W. Turpin to the Fifty-first Congress and served from June 4, 1890, until March 3, 1891. He unsuccessfully contested the election of Louis W. Turpin to the Fifty-second Congress. He engaged in mercantile pursuits and continued as a planter. He died in Hayneville, Alabama, on November 18, 1896. He was interred in Pines Cemetery.

U.S. House of Representatives
Preceded by Louis W. Turpin	Member of the U.S. House of Representatives from Alabama's 4th congressional district 1890–1891	Succeeded by Louis W. Turpin
