= Aldrich Coal Mine Museum =

- Location: 137 Highway 203, Montevallo, AL 35115
- Type: Local history museum

Montevallo Coal Mine Company Store
- Location within Alabama
- 33.1078°N 86.8939°W
- Location: Montevallo, Alabama

History
- Founded: 1928

Alabama Register of Landmarks and Heritage
- Official name: Montevallo Coal Mine Company Store
- Designated: August 5, 2010

The Aldrich Coal Mine Museum is a historical museum located in the former company store of Montevallo, Alabama. Aldrich was once a coal mining town, but is now a part of Montevallo. The museum contains historical photographs, artifacts, and displays from Aldrich's coal mine, churches, school, prison, stores, and post office. The only coal mining monument in Alabama, built in 1997, is on display outside of the museum.

== History ==
Aldrich's coal mining history dates back as far as 1839. The museum is housed in the former Montevallo Mine Company commissary, documented by the Historic American Engineering Record as part of the Birmingham District. The Montevallo Coal Mine Company Store is listed on the Alabama Register of Landmarks and Heritage. The Montevallo Coal Mine Company was owned by two brothers, Truman and William Farrington Aldrich. The store closed on July 5, 1942.

After the store's closure, the building was purchased by a local history enthusiast and former mine worker, Henry Emfinger, who used the store, as well as another building owned by the brothers - Farrington Hall - to house his collection of coal mining artefacts.

== Collections ==
The museum aims to recreate the company store and commissary from the mine as they were in the 1940s, featuring the original cash register and sales counter. It is also home to a simulated coal mine.

The collection features items from the coal mines, churches, school, stores, post office, and prison in Aldrich, and also details what life was like for African American citizens living and working there.

== Gallery ==
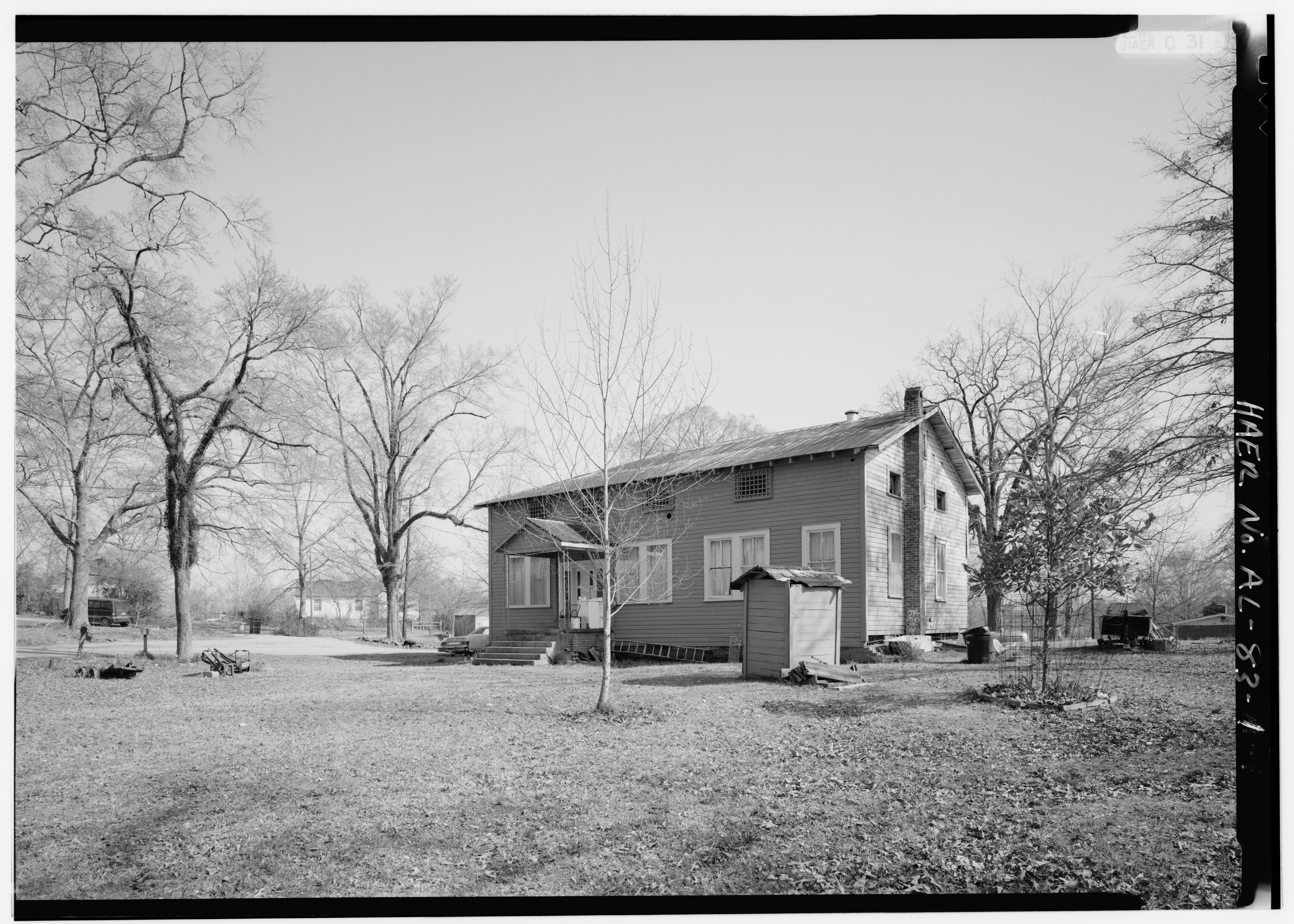
Aldrich Commissary

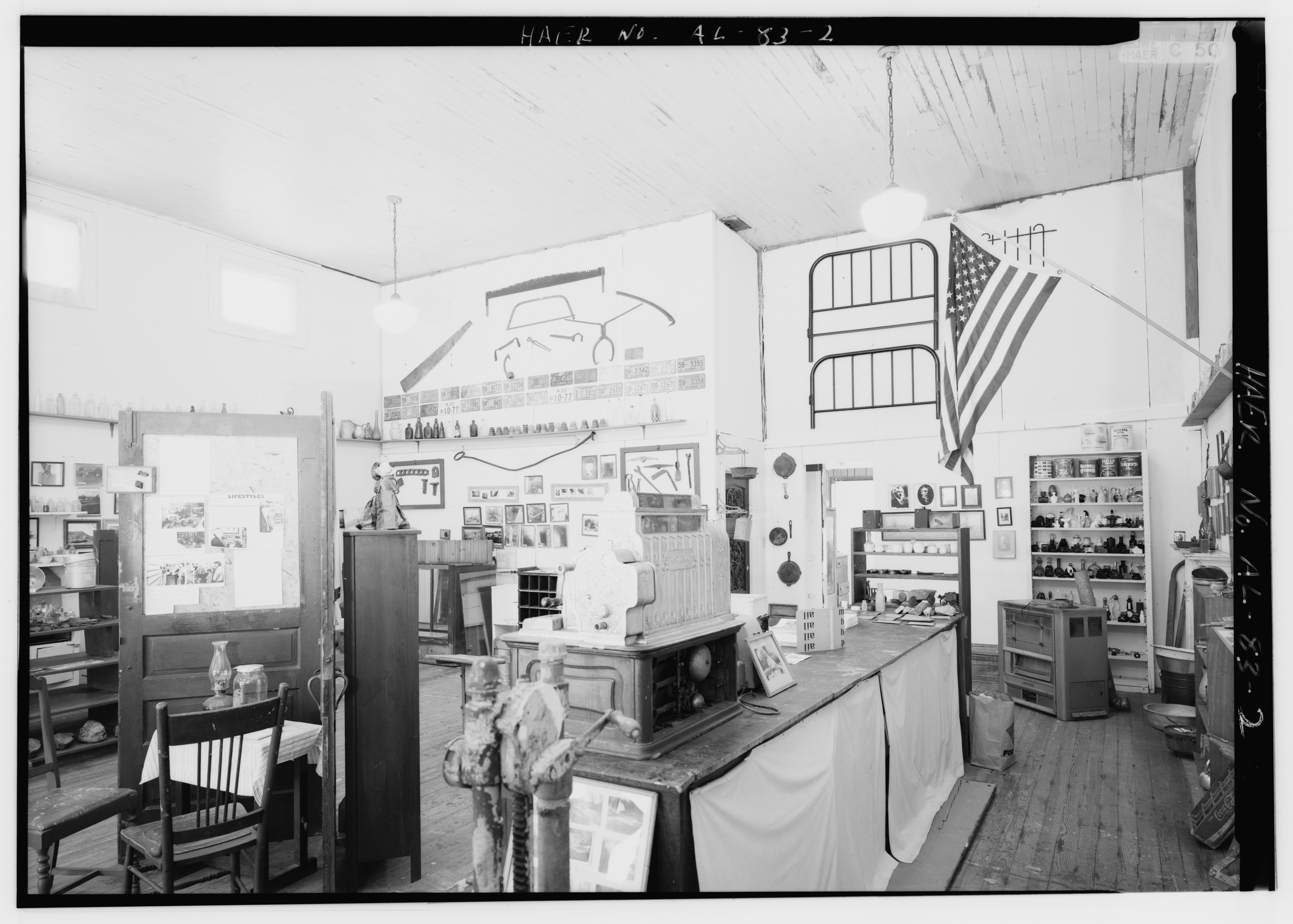
Commissary interior
