= Aldrich, Alabama =

- Unincorporated community
- Location within Alabama Location within the United States
- Coordinates: 33°06′27″N 86°53′28″W
- Country: United States
- State: Alabama
- County: Shelby
- Elevation: 456 ft (139 m)
- Time zone: UTC-6 (Central (CST))
  - Summer (DST): UTC-5 (CDT)
- Area codes: 205, 659
- GNIS feature ID: 112976

Aldrich is an unincorporated community in Shelby County, Alabama, United States, that is now part of Montevallo.

== History ==
Coal was mined in the area around Aldrich beginning in 1839. In 1875, Truman H. Aldrich purchased the town surrounding the mines and named it Aldrich. He leased the mining operations to his younger brother, William F. Aldrich, who was married to Josephine Cables Aldrich, spiritualist, Theosophist, editor, and publisher. Convict labor was employed at some time during the operation of Aldrich's coal mines, and is mentioned in Douglas Blackmon's Slavery By Another Name. A prison was built to house the convicts, and the convict cemetery is located near where the prison once stood. The community was once home to churches, a school, and houses that were all built by the operators of the mines. A post office was established in 1883, with William Aldrich as the first postmaster, and was in use until it was closed in 1965. From 1895 to 1902, Aldrich had a locally published newspaper, The Alabama time-piece. The mines were closed on July 5, 1942. Today, Aldrich is home to the Aldrich Coal Mine Museum.

== Demographics ==
Aldrich never reported a population figure separately on the U.S. Census as an unincorporated community on the U.S. Census according to the census returns from 1850-2010. It has since been annexed into Montevallo.

== Gallery ==
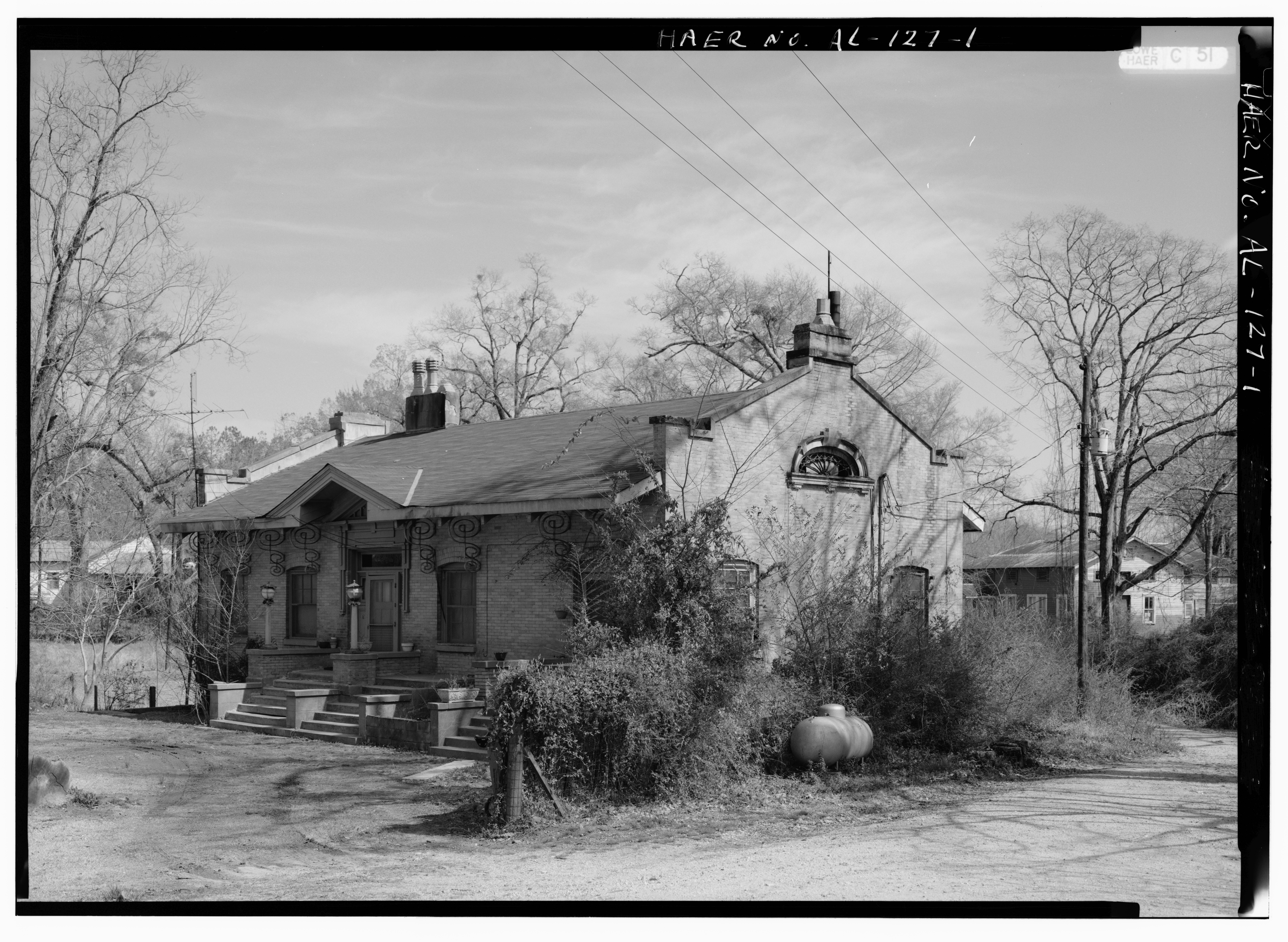
Farrington Hall

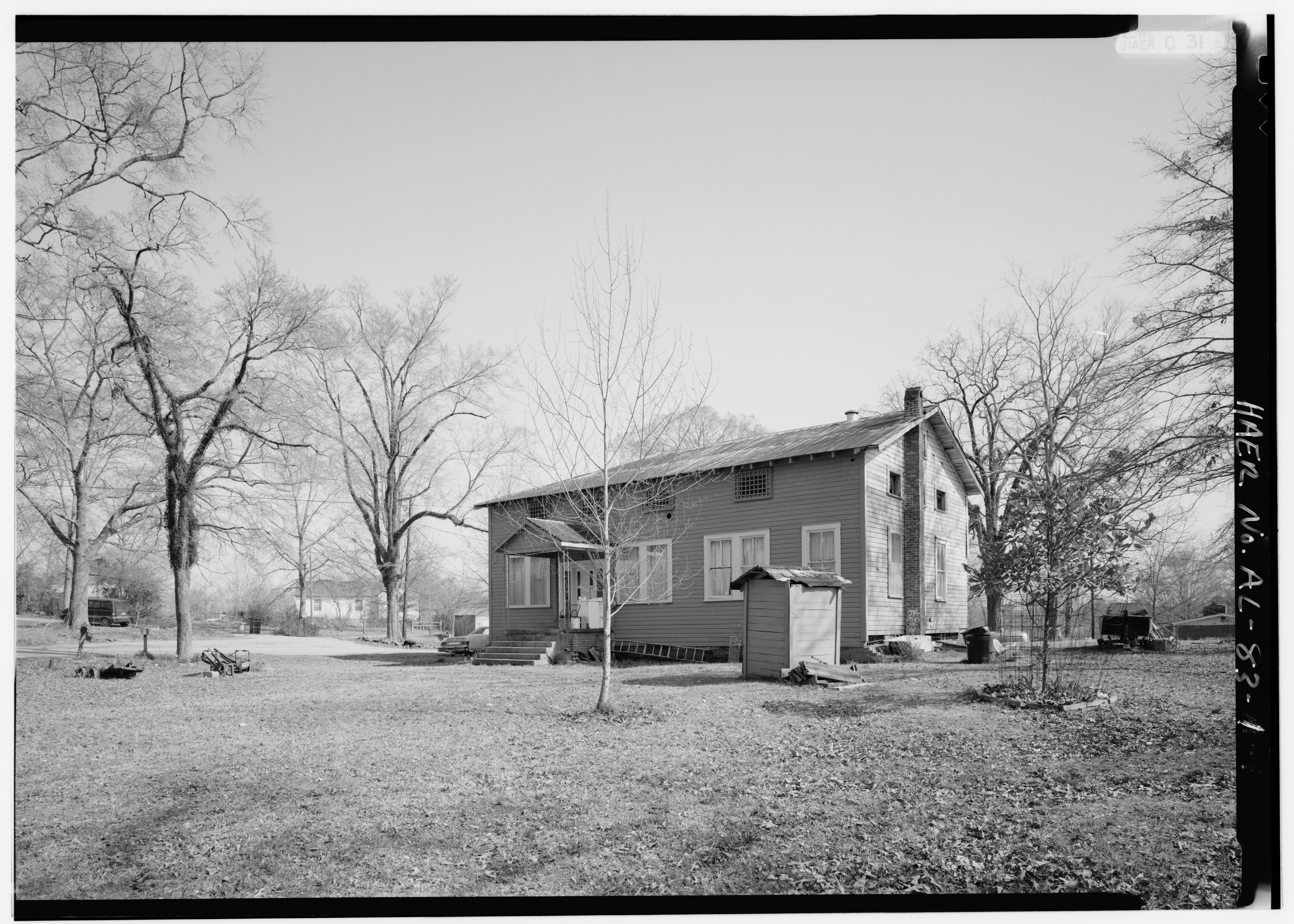
Aldrich Commissary

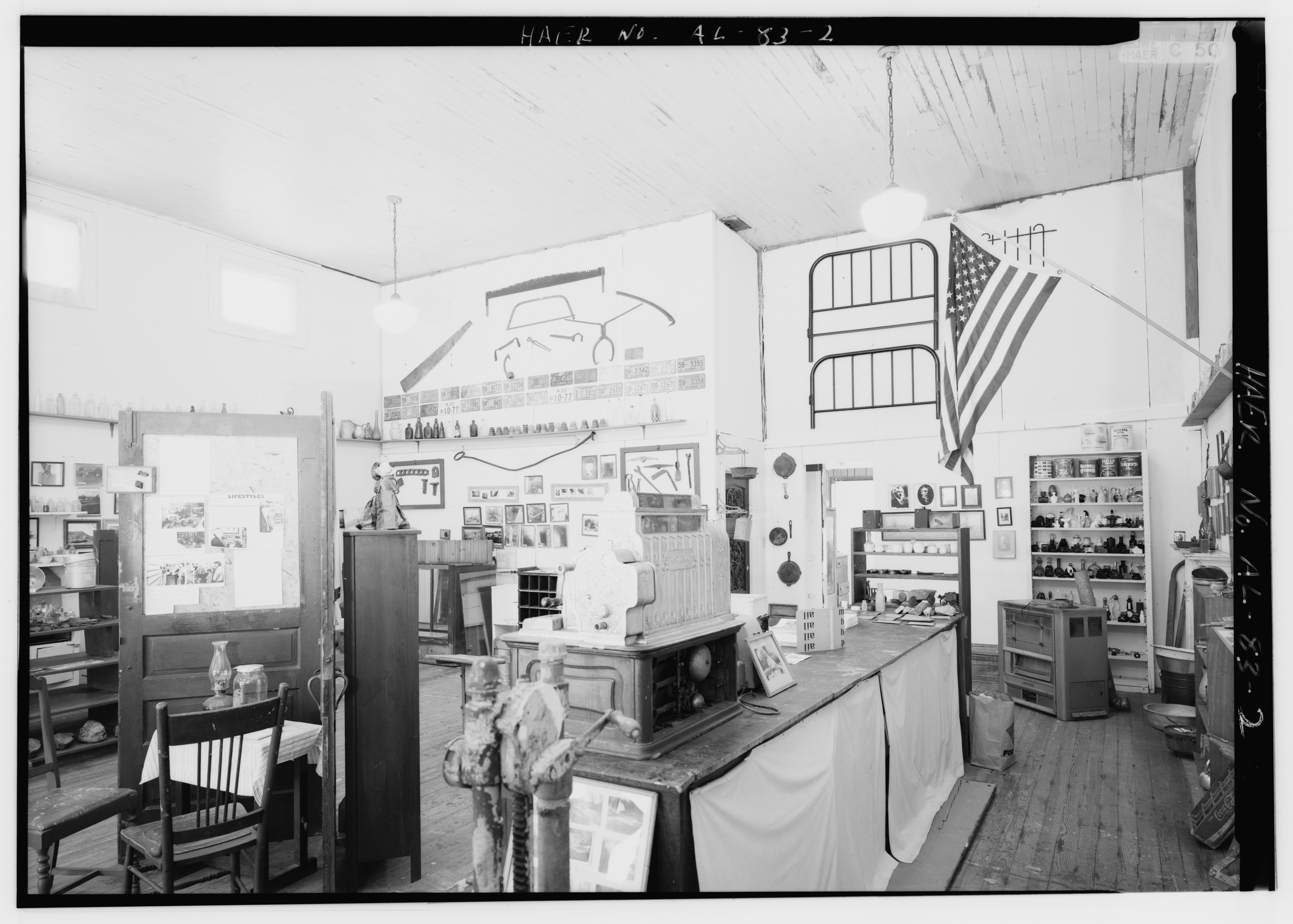
Artifact collection located in commissary

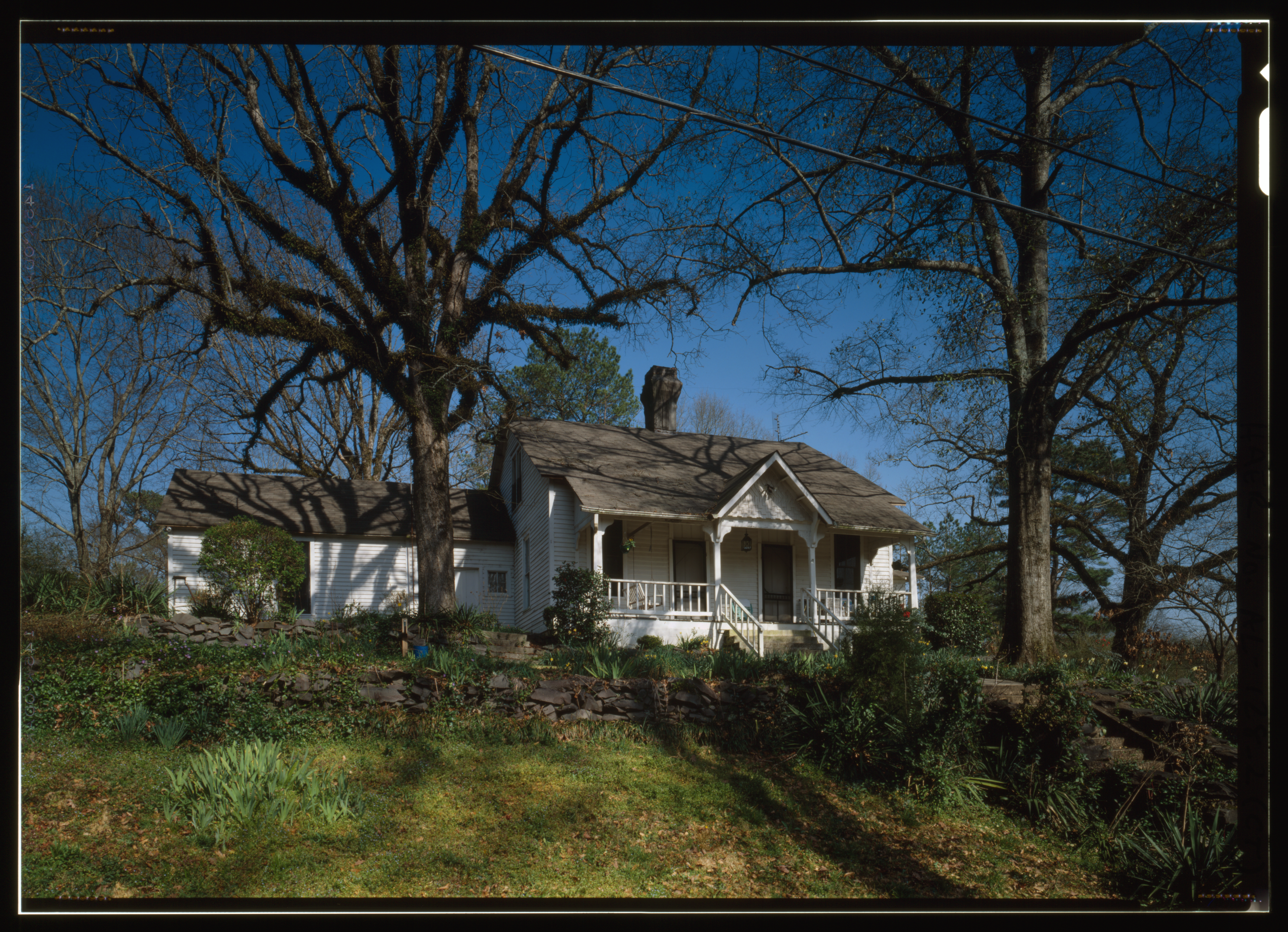
Superintendent's House (colorized from original photograph)
