= Stephen C. Minkin Paleozoic Footprint Site =

Alabama fossil site

Steven C. Minkin Paleozoic Footprint Site, formerly the Union Chapel Mine, is a former coal mine east of Jasper, Alabama in Walker County, Alabama, that became an important fossil site in Alabama after an Oneonta High School science teacher discovered fossil tracks in the rocks at the site in 1999 while preparing for a school field trip. The mine belonged to a family member of one of the children in his class. Since then, the site has yielded thousands of vertebrate and invertebrate trace fossils, and is considered as one of the richest Carboniferous tracksites in the world.

The Minkin Site was once part of a "swampy tropical forest adjacent to a tidal flat during the Coal Age or Carboniferous Period more than 300 million years ago. That fecund strand of sand and mud at the ocean’s edge teemed with the earth’s earliest reptiles as well as amphibians, fish, horseshoe crabs, spiders, jumping insects, and other fascinating organisms."

The site is Paleozoic and yields tetrapod trackways on monthly trips organized by the Alabama Paleontological Society. The site is one of the most abundant sources of trackways of its age.

Invertebrate traces, including Treptichnus and Arenicolites, are common.

The 2016 book Footprints in Stone by Ronald J. Buta and David C. Kopaska-Merkel is about the site and its discovery. In 2012 they wrote a guidebook for the site.

Digs open to the public have been held at the site. Ichnofossils including various Kouphichnium have been found at the site.

Alabama Public Television aired a Discovering Alabama episode on fossiling and fossil sites in Alabama including this one.
