= William F. Aldrich =

American politician (1853–1925)

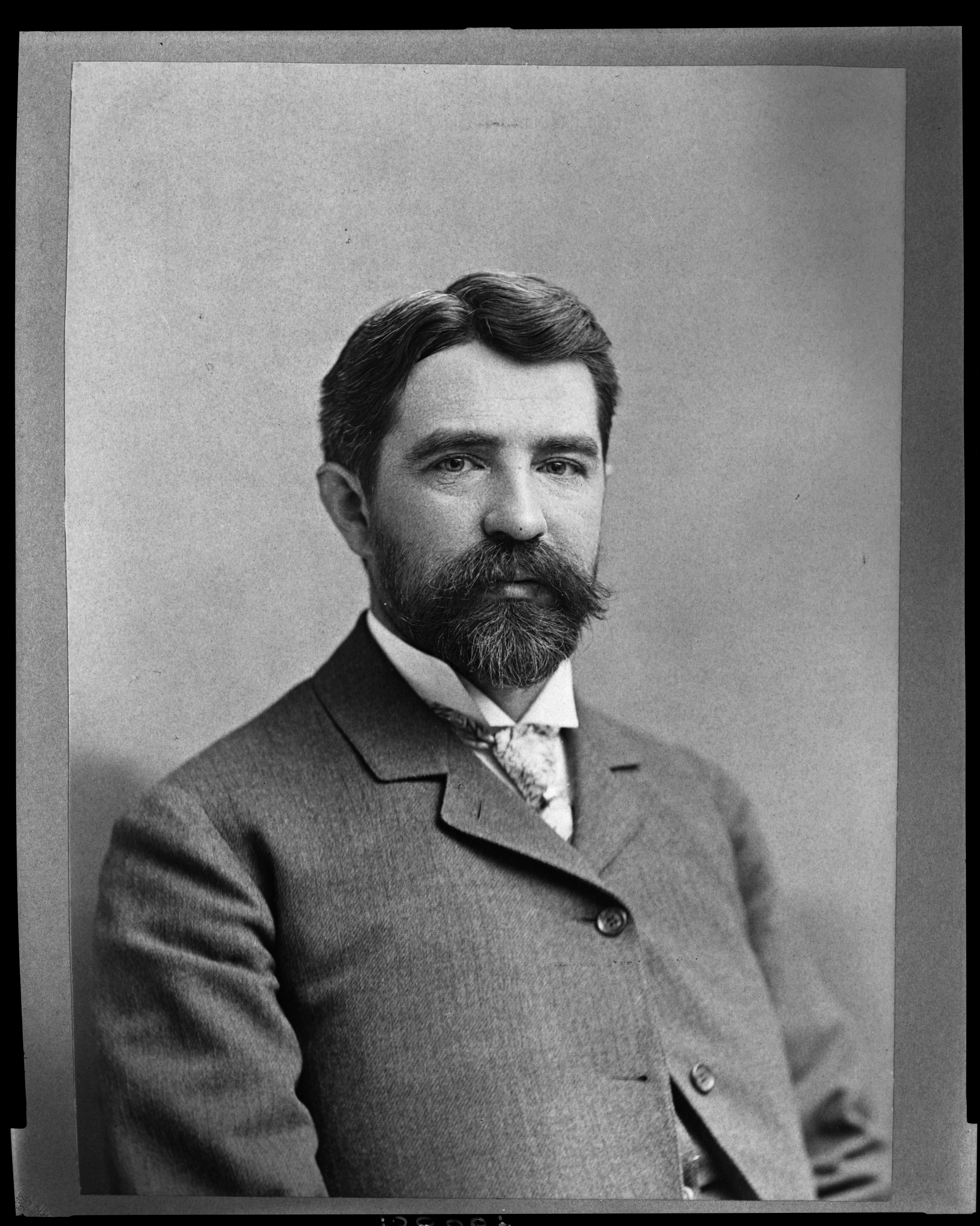
- Congressman William F. Aldrich (R-AL), 1896

Member of the U.S. House of Representatives from Alabama's 4th district
- In office March 13, 1896 – March 3, 1897
- Preceded by: Gaston A. Robbins
- Succeeded by: Thomas S. Plowman
- In office February 9, 1898 – March 3, 1899
- Preceded by: Thomas S. Plowman
- Succeeded by: Gaston A. Robbins
- In office March 8, 1900 – March 3, 1901
- Preceded by: Gaston A. Robbins
- Succeeded by: Sydney J. Bowie

Personal details
- Born: William Farrington Aldrich; March 11, 1853 Palmyra, New York, U.S.
- Died: October 30, 1925 (aged 72) Birmingham, Alabama, U.S.
- Resting place: Rock Creek Cemetery; Washington, D.C., U.S.
- Party: Republican
- Spouse(s): Josephine Cables Aldrich, Fannie Spire Aldrich
- Education: Warren's Military Academy
- Profession: Politician, manufacturer, editor, publisher

William Farrington Aldrich (March 11, 1853 – October 30, 1925) was an American businessman and politician who served three non-consecutive stints as a U.S. representative from Alabama around the turn of the 20th century.

He was brother of Truman Heminway Aldrich and great-great-grandfather of William J. Edwards.

He was the last Republican that Alabama sent to congress until 1965, part of the Jim Crow era dominance of the south by the Democratic Party.

== Biography ==
One of four siblings, William Aldrich was born in Palmyra, New York on March 11, 1853, he was the son of William Farrington and Louisa Maria (Klapp) Aldrich.

He attended public schools, and moved with his father to New York City in 1865, where he attended several schools and graduated from Warren's Military Academy in Poughkeepsie, New York, in 1873 after studying civil engineering. Aldrich moved to Alabama in 1874.

He leased the coal mines in Aldrich, Alabama from his brother Truman, who was prospecting for new coal seams in the area. The brothers became extremely successful and gained great wealth and prominence in the Alabama business community.

He was married on April 16, 1889, to writer and editor Josephine Cables, who died in 1917. He married Fannie Spire on July 15, 1920.

== Congress ==
William Aldrich served as postmaster of the town that would bear his family name.

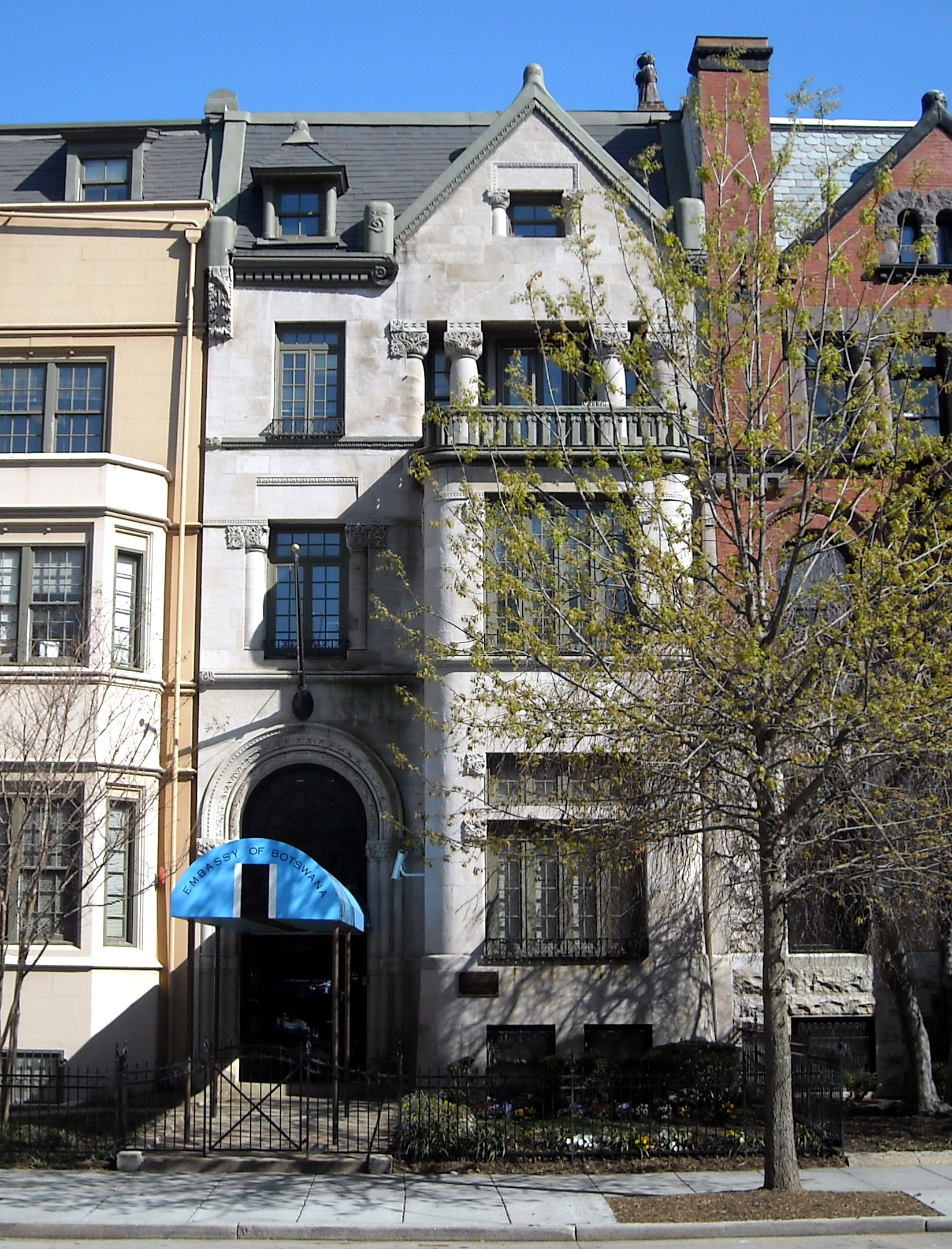
Former Residence of William F. Aldrich in Washington, D.C.

Later, he was elected as a Republican to the Fifty-fourth Congress, defeating Gaston A. Robbins in a hard-fought race that needed to be confirmed by the U.S. House of Representatives. He supported business issues and gained the political support of the Birmingham business community. Despite this connection, Aldrich campaigned in favor of the silver coinage standard, rather than the gold standard favored by Republicans. This helped Aldrich win the support of some Populist voters in the district, which may have made the difference in the close race. He reversed his position once elected, also voting in favor of key Republican issues such as private ownership of the nation's railways.

He was also elected to the Fifty-fifth Congress, defeating Thomas S. Plowman, and the Fifty-sixth Congress, again defeating Robbins. In all, Aldrich served from March 13, 1896, to March 3, 1901.

He served as a delegate to the 1900 Republican National Convention that renominated President William McKinley and his new vice presidential nominee, Theodore Roosevelt.

== Later career and death ==
Declining to run for reelection in 1900, Aldrich was involved in mining and manufacturing and built up the town that bears his name. He was editor, owner and publisher of the Birmingham (Alabama) Times. He was a delegate to the Republican National Convention at Chicago in 1904, although he was critical of President Roosevelt in writings and editorials, claiming the president was too liberal for a Republican.

He engaged in the development of mineral lands until his death in Birmingham on October 30, 1925.

He was cremated and his ashes are interred in the family vault located in Rock Creek Cemetery, Washington, D.C.

== Legacy ==
William F. Aldrich was the last Republican to represent Alabama in Congress until 1965. His great-grandson William J. (Jack) Edwards represented Alabama in Congress from 1965 to 1985 as a Republican.

U.S. House of Representatives
Preceded by Gaston A. Robbins	Member of the U.S. House of Representatives from Alabama's 4th congressional district 1896–1897	Succeeded by Thomas S. Plowman
Preceded by Thomas S. Plowman	Member of the U.S. House of Representatives from Alabama's 4th congressional district 1898–1899	Succeeded by Gaston A. Robbins
Preceded by Gaston A. Robbins	Member of the U.S. House of Representatives from Alabama's 4th congressional district 1901–1901	Succeeded by Sydney J. Bowie
