= George Packer bibliography =

List of the published work of George Packer, American journalist, novelist, and playwright.

== Books ==
- Packer, George (1988). The village of waiting. New York: Vintage Books.
- — (1991). The half man. New York: Random House.
- — (1998). Central Square : a novel. Saint Paul, Minn.: Graywolf Press.]
- — (2000). Blood of the liberals. New York: Farrar, Straus and Giroux.
- —, ed. (2003). The fight is for democracy: winning the war of ideas in America and the world. New York: Harper Perennial.
- — (2005). The Assassins' Gate: America in Iraq. New York: Farrar, Straus and Giroux.
- — (2008). Betrayed : a play. New York: Faber & Faber.
- — (2009). Interesting times : writings from a turbulent decade. New York: Farrar, Straus and Giroux.
- — (2011). The photographs of Arthur Rothstein. London: Giles in association with the Library of Congress.
- — (2013). The unwinding : an inner history of the new America. New York: Farrar, Straus and Giroux.
- — (2019). Our Man: Richard Holbrooke and the End of the American Century. New York: Alfred A. Knopf.
- — (2021). Last Best Hope: America in Crisis and Renewal. New York: Farrar, Straus and Giroux.

Reprints

- Packer, George (2001). The village of waiting. New York: Farrar, Straus and Giroux.

== Essays and reporting ==
- Packer, George (February 11–18, 2013). "Long engagements". The Talk of the Town. Comment. The New Yorker. 89 (1): 31–32. Hillary Clinton stepping down as Secretary of State.
- — (April 29, 2013). "A place in history". The Talk of the Town. Comment. The New Yorker. 89 (11): 17–18. Boston Marathon bombing
- — (April 29, 2013). "Don't look down : the new Depression journalism". The Critics. A Critic at Large. The New Yorker. 89 (11): 70–75.
- — (July 22, 2013). "Conflicting interests". The Talk of the Town. Comment. The New Yorker. 89 (21): 21–22.
- — (September 30, 2013). "Negotiating Syria". The Talk of the Town. Comment. The New Yorker. 89 (30): 21–22.
- — (October 28, 2013). "Business as usual". The Talk of the Town. Comment. The New Yorker. 89 (34): 21–22.
- — (March 31, 2014). "Terms of crisis". The Talk of the Town. Comment. The New Yorker. 90 (6): 17–18.
- — (August 25, 2014). "The common enemy". The Talk of the Town. Comment. The New Yorker. 90 (24): 17–18.
- — (October 20, 2014). "The holder of secrets : Laura Poitras's closeup view of Edward Snowden". Profiles. The New Yorker. 90 (32): 50–59.
- — (April 13, 2015). "Mute button". The Talk of the Town. Comment. The New Yorker. 91 (8): 19–20.
- — (July 20, 2015). "Dark hours : violence in the age of the war on terror". The Critics. Books. The New Yorker. 91 (20): 72–75.
- — (November 23, 2015). "Still standing". The Talk of the Town. Comment. The New Yorker. 91 (37): 35–36.
- — (February 22, 2016). "Turned around : why do leftists move to the right?". The Critics. Books. The New Yorker. 92 (2): 69–73.
- — (March 7, 2016). "Can you keep a secret? The former C.I.A. chief Michael Hayden on torture and transparency". The Critics. Books. The New Yorker. 92 (4): 67–69.
- — (February 27, 2017). "Official duties". The Talk of the Town. Comment. The New Yorker. 93 (2): 21–22.
- — (May 2019). "Elegy for the American Century". The Atlantic. 323 (11).
- — (July 2019). "George Orwell's unheeded warning". The Culture File. Books. The Atlantic. 324 (1): 40–42.
