= Jeff Connaughton =

American political aide (born 1959)

- Education: University of Alabama B.S., University of Chicago Booth School of Business MBA, Stanford Law School J.D.
- Known for: Aide to Joe Biden
- Political party: Democratic

Jeff Connaughton is an American former political aide and lobbyist. Known for being a longtime aide to Joe Biden, he served as Chief of Staff to Senator Ted Kaufman from 2009 to 2010 and previously cofounded Quinn Gillespie & Associates.

== Early life and education ==
Connaughton was raised in Alabama and studied business at the University of Alabama, graduating in 1981. He then earned an MBA from Chicago Booth in 1983.

In 1991, he returned to school and enrolled at Stanford Law School, graduating in 1994 and was hired to clerk for Chief Judge Abner Mikva at the DC Circuit.

== Career ==
He began working for Biden in 1987 during his 1988 presidential campaign under Ted Kaufman and went on to work in his Senate office following the campaign.

When Mikva became White House Counsel in 1994, Connaughton joined him. After leaving the Clinton administration, Connaughton moved to K Street to work for Covington & Burling then Arnold & Porter. Following the Clinton administration, he was a founder of Quinn Gillespie & Associates where he became vice chairman and worked for 12 years.

He returned to Capitol Hill in 2009 to serve as chief of staff to Kaufman who was appointed to fill the remainder of Biden's term. At the time, some saw the move as a step toward a potential return to the White House under President Obama, who had a policy prohibiting lobbyists from being hired within two years of their lobbying work. As chief of staff, he played a key role in the unsuccessful push for the Brown–Kaufman amendment which he has said "radicalized" him.

== Books ==
In 2012, Connaughton's book, The Payoff: Why Wall Street Always Wins, recounting his role in the failed effort to pass the Brown–Kaufman amendment was published. In it, he argued that big banks held too much power over U.S. politics. He is one of the four primary subjects featured in George Packer’s 2013 book, The Unwinding.
