= The Dive from Clausen's Pier =

The Dive from Clausen's Pier may refer to:

- The Dive from Clausen's Pier (novel), a 2002 novel by Ann Packer
- The Dive from Clausen's Pier (film), a 2005 film, based on the novel
