= Herbert Packer =

Herbert Packer may refer to:

- Herbert Annesley Packer (1894–1962), British Royal Navy admiral
- Herbert L. Packer (1925–1972), American criminologist
