= Tax and spend =

Political term for policies that increase public spending by increasing taxation

"Tax and spend" is a term used in politics meaning government policy to increase or collect taxes for the purpose of increasing public spending. The term is commonly used as criticism; some have embraced the label.

The 1936 United States Supreme Court case United States v. Butler grappled with the question of the constitutionality of tax and spend policy in the United States, with the Court majority concluding that "the power to tax and spend includes the power to relieve a nationwide economic maladjustment by conditional gifts of money".

== History ==
The term, in the form "taxing and spending", is attested from 1928. It was used, in the form "spend and tax", in the 18 October 1938 edition of The New York Times, in a profile of Franklin D. Roosevelt's advisor Harry Hopkins, the administrator of the Works Progress Administration (WPA), a key agency of Roosevelt's New Deal program, written by Arthur Krock, with the subheading "Spend and Tax, [Hopkins'] Motto". The term appeared again in a later 1938 report in The New York Times, written by Krock, quoting Hopkins. He wrote that "[Hopkins] met a criticism of this sinister combination by saying: 'We will spend and spend, and tax and tax, and elect and elect.'" According to Krock, the "sinister combination" was Roosevelt, Hopkins, United States Postmaster General James Farley, and New Jersey Democratic political boss Frank Hague.

Two weeks later, Hopkins and Krock argued the point in duelling letters to the editor of The New York Times. First Hopkins flatly denied he had ever laid out the "tax, spend, elect" formulation, but Krock asserted that "I used and printed the quotation after careful verification because, while it fitted completely into Mr. Hopkins's political philosophy as I have understood it, I wanted to be certain of the language." Krock also revealed that he had spoken with witnesses who claimed to have heard Hopkins make the comment at the Empire Race Track in Yonkers, New York, including a "reputable citizen" who was "in lighter hours, a playmate of Mr. Hopkins".

== Use of tax and spend policies ==
Tax and spend is an umbrella term that can refer to various government policies or programs which raise revenues in order to fund government programs. For example, many local jurisdictions, particularly in the raise revenues for specific programs through financial referendums to voters. Referendums on tax and spend programs often raise revenues in the United States through property or sales tax to fund public education, or public works projects, such as transportation infrastructure, housing, or public safety programs.

== Political discourse ==
Throughout the Great Depression, opponents of Roosevelt's New Deal tax and spend programs criticized the agenda. The 1936 case United States v. Butler ultimately gave Roosevelt authority to tax and spend under the Taxing and Spending Clause of the United States Constitution.

In a 1989 opinion column for The New York Times, then-chairman of the National Republican Congressional Committee, Guy Vander Jagt, wrote that "Tax-and-Spend Democrats Never Learn", citing George H. W. Bush's "no new taxes" slogan to critique tax and spend policies advocated by some Democrats. A 2019 article in The Washington Times quotes Jim Manley, a Democratic strategist, as saying that "Democrats used to be scared of [tax and spend], but not anymore", with the author adding that "Democrats are convinced that the Reagan-era epithet 'tax-and-spend liberals' is no longer a candidate killer."

The term is used similarly in the United Kingdom, as well as in Australia.
