= Safe banking act =

Safe banking act can refer to one of the following:

- Brown–Kaufman amendment, proposed legislation of 2010 concerning regulation of large banks
- SAFE Banking Act, proposed legislation of 2019 concerning cannabis and federally regulated banks
