= David Hoppe =

David Hoppe may refer to:

- John David Hoppe (born 1951), known as Dave, Capitol Hill politician and lobbyist
- David Heinrich Hoppe (1760–1846), German pharmacist, botanist, entomologist and physician
