= The Dive from Clausen's Pier (novel) =

2002 novel by Ann Packer

- Author: Ann Packer
- Language: English
- Publication date: 2002

The Dive from Clausen's Pier is the bestselling debut novel of American author Ann Packer. It was first published in 2002 by Alfred A. Knopf.

Told through first person narration, the novel centers on Carrie Bell's response to her fiancé's paralysis and through her reactions, questions the obligations and loyalty people have to those in their life. The novel is divided into three parts which detail the transitions of Carrie's life.

== Plot ==
The story begins with a group of close friends from small town Madison, Wisconsin who head to Clausen's Pier to celebrate Memorial Day. Carrie Bell has been thinking, for a long time, of how her longtime relationship with fiancé Mike Mayer is wilting away. As everyone has noticed her withdrawal from Mike, Mike decides to win back her attention by taking a daring dive off of the pier into the shallow waters below. As a result of this dive, he breaks his neck and becomes paralyzed. While all of the friends do their best to help him adapt to the situation, Carrie finds herself under too much pressure to stay in the situation, and impulsively moves to New York City.

In New York, Carrie attempts to come to terms with who she is as a person. She faces the guilt of leaving behind her life and paraplegic fiancé. She finds herself in love with a new man, Killroy, who helps her find herself. Carrie, being exposed to the fast-paced and electric city life, finds her release in fashion.

However, the guilt becomes too much for Carrie and she is drawn back to the Midwest. She finds that the bonds are still strong and that while New York was an escape for her, her life is truly in Madison. She returns to her hometown and makes strong efforts to rebuild her relationships not only with Mike, but with her friends, family, and herself.

== General facts ==
Setting: Madison, Washington and Manhattan, New York in modern day, 21st century
Narration: First Person Narrator, Carrie Bell
Conflict Type: Internal Conflict
Conflict Kind: Psychological, Classical
Main Characters: Carrie Bell, Mike Mayer, Killroy
Secondary Characters: Mrs. Bell, Mrs. Mayer, Simon, Jamie, Rooster

== Reception ==
The novel was named as one of the Best Books of the Year by Entertainment Weekly, Newsday, San Francisco Chronicle, and San Jose Mercury News. In 2005, the novel was adapted into a television movie for the Lifetime network and starred Michelle Trachtenberg as Carrie Bell and Will Estes as Mike Mayer.
