= The Village of Waiting =

- Author: George Packer
- Language: English
- Publisher: Farrar, Straus and Giroux
- Publication date: 1984
- Publication place: United States
- Media type: Print (Hardback & Paperback)
- ISBN: 9780394757544

After serving with the Peace Corps in Togo in 1982–1983, George Packer wrote The Village of Waiting about his experiences there. The book chronicles Packer's time as an English teacher in the small village of Lavie (meaning "wait a little longer"), as well as his visits to the capital Lomé and several other African countries. Packer mixes anecdotes about the people he met in Togo with political observations (notably harsh criticisms of Togolese President Gnassingbé Eyadéma) and many of the lessons he learned while serving. In an afterword to the most recent (2001) edition, Packer follows up with many of the characters from the original version and reflects upon the changes Togo has experienced since his time there. Packer was an early termination from the Peace Corps, leaving Togo six months prior to the end of his contracted period of service. He chose not to mention this fact in the book, however.
