= Nancy Huddleston Packer =

American writer (1925–2025)

Nancy Huddleston Packer

Nancy Huddleston Packer (May 2, 1925 – April 1, 2025) was an American writer of short fiction and memoir, who was the Melvin and Bill Lane Professor in the Humanities at Stanford University.

== Early life and education ==
Packer was born on May 2, 1925 in Washington, D.C., where her father, George Huddleston, was a member of the U.S. House of Representatives, representing Alabama’s 9th congressional district. She was one of five children, and as a child lived in both Washington and Birmingham, Alabama. She graduated from Birmingham–Southern College in 1945, and gained a master's degree in theology from the University of Chicago in 1947. She then studied creative writing with Hudson Strode at the University of Alabama.

== Career ==
Packer's first published work appeared in Harper's in 1953, and other work appeared in Dude. In 1957, she married Herbert L. Packer, and moved to California with him when he was appointed to Stanford University as a professor of law. She was awarded a fellowship at Stanford University's creative writing center for 1959-60, and studied writing with Wallace Stegner, before joining the faculty in 1961 as a professor of English and creative writing. Her short stories appeared in the O. Henry Award Prize Stories in 1969 and 1981. From 1989-1993 she directed the Stanford University program in creative writing. Among her students were Michael Cunningham and Ethan Canin. She served as fiction jury chair for the 2002 Pulitzer Prize, and continued to teach creative writing through Stanford Continuing Studies.

== Personal life and death ==
Packer's literary accomplishments include three short story collections and a memoir, published between 1976 and 1997. She retired from Stanford University in 1993, having served as the director of the Creative Writing Program and held the esteemed Melvin and Bill Lane Professorship in the Humanities. She resided in Palo Alto, California. Her children George Packer and Ann Packer also pursue writing careers. Her husband died in 1972.

Packer died from Alzheimer's disease on April 1, 2025, at the age of 99.

In the October 2026 issue of [[The Atlantic]], an article by son, George, entitled "Sons and Mothers" was a candid portrait and paean to his mother Nancy who "devoted her life to teaching writers. Becoming one meant escaping the story she had written for me." And among Nancy Packer's final words to George as she lay dying were, "I love you. I'm proud of you. Now go on about your business."

== Bibliography ==
- 1976 The Short Story: An Introduction (with Wilfred Stone and Robert Hoopes)
- 1976 Small Moments
- 1986 Writing Worth Reading: A Practical Guide (with John Timpane)
- 1988 In My Father's House: Tales of an Unconformable Man
- 1989 The Women Who Walk
- 1997 Jealous-Hearted Me
- 2012 Old Ladies
