= Paul Ryan =

American politician (born 1970)

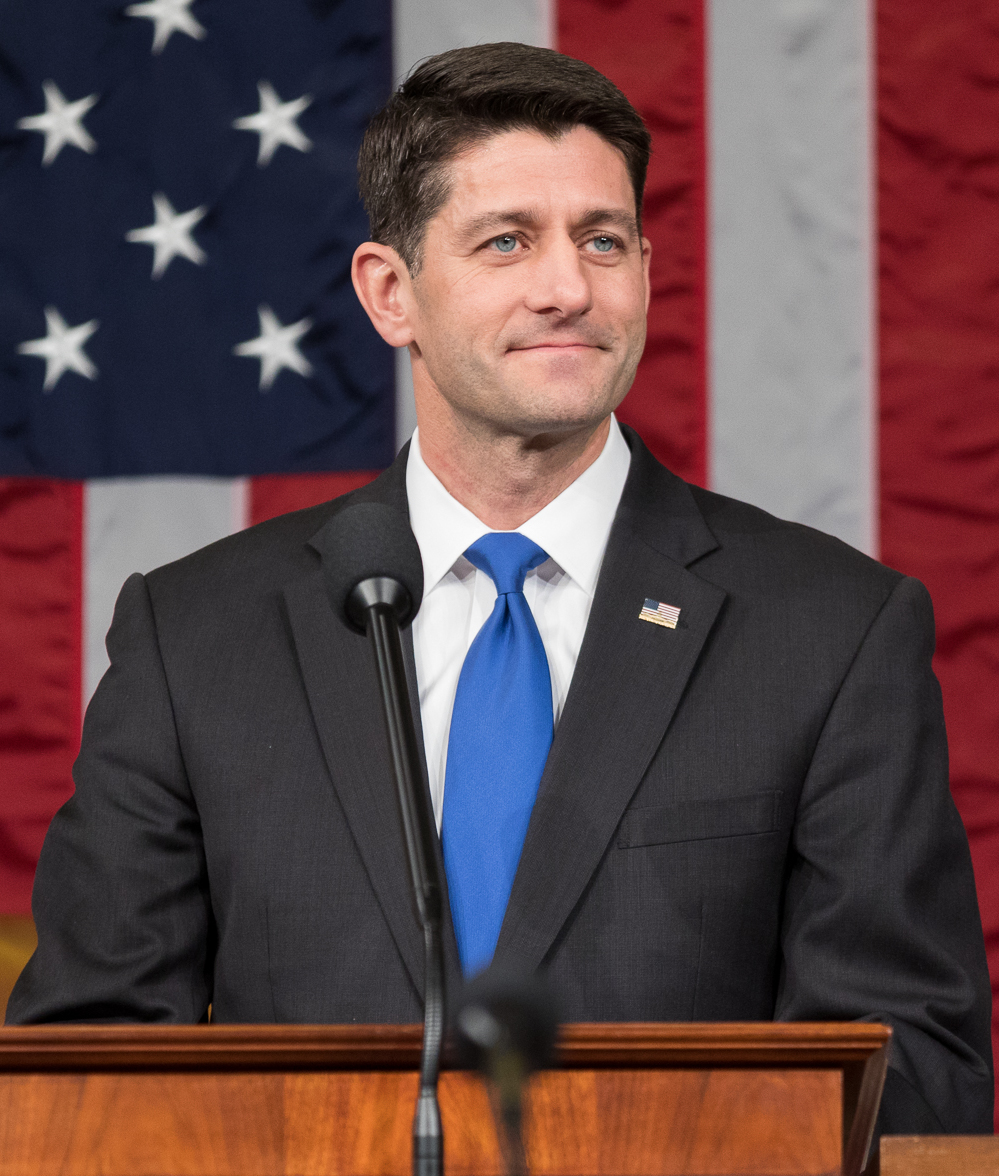
- Official portrait, 2017

54th Speaker of the United States House of Representatives
- In office October 29, 2015 – January 3, 2019
- Preceded by: John Boehner
- Succeeded by: Nancy Pelosi
House positions
Leader of the House Republican Conference
In office October 29, 2015 – January 3, 2019
Deputy	Kevin McCarthy
Preceded by	John Boehner
Succeeded by	Kevin McCarthy
Chair of the House Ways and Means Committee
In office January 3, 2015 – October 29, 2015
Preceded by	Dave Camp
Succeeded by	Sam Johnson (acting)
Chair of the House Budget Committee
In office January 3, 2011 – January 3, 2015
Preceded by	John Spratt
Succeeded by	Tom Price

Member of the U.S. House of Representatives from Wisconsin's 1st district
- In office January 3, 1999 – January 3, 2019
- Preceded by: Mark Neumann
- Succeeded by: Bryan Steil

Personal details
- Born: Paul Davis Ryan; January 29, 1970 (age 56) Janesville, Wisconsin, U.S.
- Party: Republican
- Spouse: Janna Little (m. 2000)
- Children: 3
- Education: Miami University (BA)
- Awards: Department of Defense Medal for Distinguished Public Service
- Ryan's voice Ryan supporting the Foundations for Evidence-Based Policymaking Act; Recorded November 15, 2017

Paul Davis Ryan (born January 29, 1970) is an American former politician who served as the 54th speaker of the United States House of Representatives from 2015 to 2019. He represented Wisconsin's 1st congressional district in the U.S. House of Representatives from 1999 to 2019. A member of the Republican Party, he was the party's vice presidential nominee in the 2012 presidential election, running alongside presidential nominee Mitt Romney.

Ryan was born in Janesville, Wisconsin, and graduated from Miami University in 1992. He spent five years working in Washington, D.C., becoming a speechwriter and legislative director, then returned to Wisconsin in 1997 to work at his family's construction company. He was elected to Congress to represent Wisconsin's 1st congressional district the following year, replacing Mark Neumann, who had vacated the seat to run for U.S. Senate. Ryan went on to represent the district for 20 years. He chaired the House Budget Committee from 2011 to 2015, and briefly chaired the House Ways and Means Committee in 2015.

A self-proclaimed deficit hawk, Ryan was a major proponent of Social Security privatization in the mid-2000s. During the 2010s, two proposals heavily influenced by Ryan—"The Path to Prosperity" and "A Better Way"—became part of the national dialogue advocating for the privatization of Medicare, the conversion of Medicaid into a block grant program, the repeal of the Affordable Care Act, and significant federal tax cuts. He was selected by Mitt Romney as the Republican vice presidential candidate in 2012, but the ticket ultimately lost to incumbents Barack Obama and Joe Biden in the presidential election.

Ryan was elected Speaker of the House after John Boehner's resignation in 2015. During his speakership, he played a key role in the passage of the Tax Cuts and Jobs Act of 2017 and the Economic Growth, Regulatory Relief and Consumer Protection Act in 2018, which partially repealed the Dodd–Frank Act. Ryan declined to run for re-election in the 2018 midterm elections. With the Democratic Party taking control of the House of Representatives, Nancy Pelosi succeeded Ryan as Speaker of the House.

== Early life and education ==
Paul Davis Ryan was born on January 29, 1970, in Janesville, Wisconsin, the youngest of four children of Elizabeth "Betty" Ann, who later became an interior designer, and Paul Murray Ryan, a lawyer. He is a fifth-generation Wisconsinite. His father was of Irish ancestry and his mother of German and English descent. One of Ryan's paternal ancestors settled in Wisconsin prior to the Civil War. His great-grandfather, Patrick William Ryan, founded an earthmoving company in 1884, which later became P. W. Ryan and Sons and is now known as Ryan Incorporated Central. Ryan's grandfather, Stanley M. Ryan, was appointed United States attorney for the Western District of Wisconsin. In 2018, while filming a segment for the PBS series Finding Your Roots, Ryan learned that his DNA results included 3 percent Ashkenazi Jewish ancestry.

Ryan attended St. Mary's Catholic School in Janesville, then attended Joseph A. Craig High School, where he was elected president of his junior class, and thus became prom king. As class president Ryan was a representative of the student body on the school board. Following his second year, Ryan took a job working the grill at McDonald's. He was on his high school's ski, track, and varsity soccer teams and played basketball in a Catholic recreational league. He participated in several academic and social clubs including the Model United Nations. Ryan and his family often went on hiking and skiing trips to the Colorado Rocky Mountains.

Although Ryan's father was not a lifelong heavy drinker, staying sober for nearly twenty years after his first stint in rehabilitation, he had become an alcoholic by the time Ryan was a teenager. Ryan later commented on his relationship with his father, whom he revered as a young child, stating that "[alcohol] made him more distant, irritable and stressed ... whiskey had washed away some of the best parts of the man I knew." When he was 16, Ryan found his 55-year-old father lying dead in bed of a heart attack, something Ryan later partially attributed to heavy alcohol consumption. Following the death of his father, Ryan's grandmother moved in with the family. As she had Alzheimer's, Ryan helped care for her while his mother commuted to college in Madison, Wisconsin. From the time of his father's death until his 18th birthday, Ryan received Social Security survivors benefits which were saved for his college education. His mother later married widower Bruce Douglas.

Ryan has a bachelor's degree in economics and political science from Miami University in Oxford, Ohio, where he became interested in the writings of Friedrich Hayek, Ludwig von Mises, and Milton Friedman. He often visited the office of libertarian professor Richard Hart to discuss the theories of these economists and of Ayn Rand. Hart introduced Ryan to National Review, and with Hart's recommendation Ryan began an internship in the D.C. office of Wisconsin U.S. Senator Bob Kasten, where he worked with Kasten's foreign affairs adviser.

Ryan attended the Washington Semester program at American University. He worked summers as a salesman for Oscar Mayer and once got to drive the Wienermobile. Ryan was a member of the College Republicans, and volunteered for the congressional campaign of John Boehner. He was a member of the Delta Tau Delta social fraternity.

== Early career ==
Betty Ryan reportedly urged her son to accept a congressional position as a legislative aide in Senator Kasten's office, which he did after graduating in 1992. In his early years working on Capitol Hill, Ryan supplemented his income by working as a waiter, as a fitness trainer, and at other jobs.

A few months after Kasten lost to Democrat Russ Feingold in the 1992 election, Ryan became a speechwriter for Empower America (which later became FreedomWorks), a conservative advocacy group founded by Jack Kemp, Jeane Kirkpatrick, and William Bennett.

Ryan later worked as a speechwriter for Kemp, the Republican vice presidential candidate in the 1996 United States presidential election. Kemp became Ryan's mentor, and Ryan has said he had a "huge influence".

In 1995, Ryan became the legislative director for then-U.S. congressman Sam Brownback of Kansas. In 1997 he returned to Wisconsin and worked for a year as a marketing consultant for the construction company Ryan Incorporated Central, owned by his relatives.

== U.S. House of Representatives ==
=== Elections ===
Ryan was first elected to the House in 1998, winning the 1st District seat of Republican Mark Neumann, a two-term incumbent who had vacated his seat to make an unsuccessful bid for the U.S. Senate. 28-year-old Ryan won the Republican primary over 29-year-old pianist Michael J. Logan of Twin Lakes, and the general election against Democrat Lydia Spottswood. This made him the second-youngest member of the House.

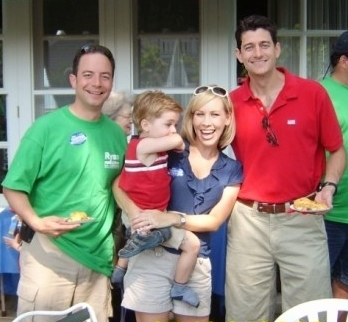
Paul Ryan with Chairman of the Republican Party of Wisconsin Reince Priebus (who later became to White House Chief of Staff) and Priebus' wife, Sally in 2008

Reelected eight times, Ryan never received less than 55 percent of the vote in a congressional election. He defeated Democratic challenger Jeffrey C. Thomas in the 2000, 2002, 2004, and 2006 elections. In the 2008 election, Ryan defeated Democrat Marge Krupp.

In the 2010 general election, he defeated Democrat John Heckenlively and Libertarian Joseph Kexel. In 2012, under Wisconsin election law, Ryan was allowed to run concurrently for vice president and for Congress and was not allowed to remove his name from the Congressional ballot after being nominated for the vice presidency. He faced Democratic nominee Rob Zerban. As of July 25, 2012, Ryan had over $5.4 million in his congressional campaign account, more than any other House member. He was reelected with 55 percent of his district's vote and 44 percent of the vote in his hometown, Janesville.

Zerban again challenged Ryan in the 2014 House election. Ryan won with 63 percent of his district's vote.

In the 2016 Republican primary election, Ryan faced businessman Paul Nehlen, who had been endorsed by Sarah Palin. Because of Nehlen's support for Trump, Trump publicly thanked him on Twitter and later told The Washington Post that Nehlen was "running a very good campaign", even though he did not endorse him. On August 5, 2016, Trump endorsed Ryan's re-election after pressure from fellow Republican leaders. In the primary election on August 9, 2016, Ryan overwhelmingly defeated Nehlen, taking over 84 percent of the vote. In the November general election, Ryan faced Democrat Rebecca Solen and won with 65 percent of his district's vote.

Committee assignments

As Speaker of the House of Representatives, Ryan was not a chair or a member of any committee. Prior to his speakership, Ryan held the following assignments:

- Committee on Ways and Means (Chairman)
  - Subcommittee on Health

Caucus memberships

- House Republican Caucus
- Caucus of House Conservatives Republican Study Committee
- United States Congressional International Conservation Caucus
- Middle East Economic Partnership Caucus
- Prayer Caucus
- Sportsmen's Caucus (Co-Chair)
- Congressional Western Caucus

=== Pre-Speaker congressional tenure (1999–2015) ===
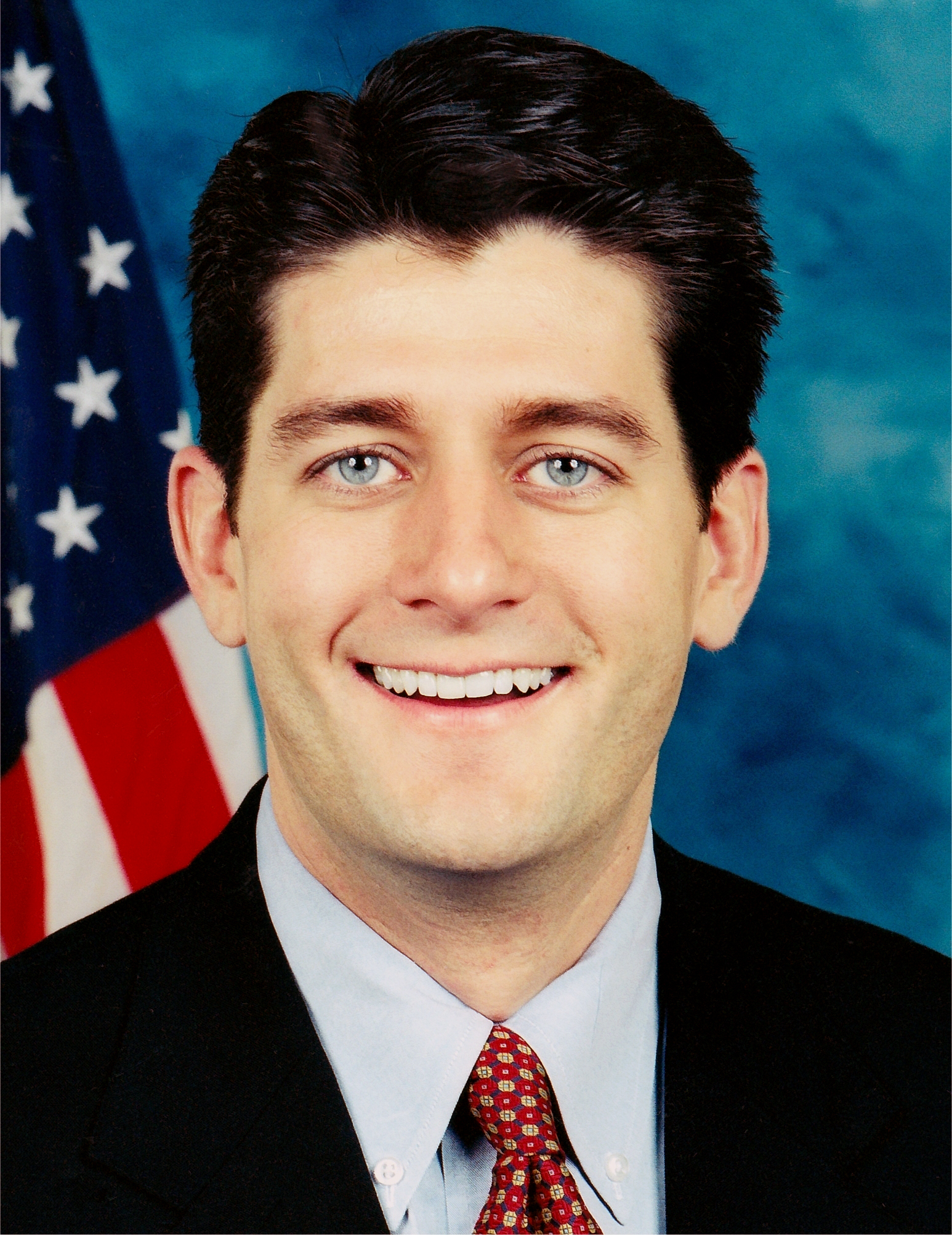
Official U.S. Congress portrait of Ryan in 2001

Ryan became the ranking Republican member of the House Budget Committee in 2007 and became chairman of the committee in 2011 after Republicans took control of the House. That same year, he was selected to deliver the Republican response to the State of the Union address. As of August 2012, Ryan had been the primary sponsor of more than 70 bills or amendments, and only two of those bills had become law. One, passed in July 2000, renamed a post office in Ryan's district; the other, passed in December 2008, lowered the excise tax on arrow shafts. As of August 2012, Ryan had also co-sponsored 975 bills, of which 176 had passed; 22% of these bills were originally sponsored by a Democrat.

Ryan was a "reliable supporter of the [George W. Bush] administration's foreign policy priorities" who voted for the 2002 Iraq Resolution, authorizing the 2003 invasion of Iraq.

In 2010, Ryan was a member of the bipartisan National Commission on Fiscal Responsibility and Reform (Bowles-Simpson Commission), which was tasked with developing a plan to reduce the federal deficit. He voted against the final report of the commission. In 2012, Ryan accused the nation's top military leaders of using "smoke and mirrors" to remain under budget limits passed by Congress. Ryan later said that he misspoke on the issue and called General Martin Dempsey, the chairman of the Joint Chiefs of Staff, to apologize for his comments.

== 2012 vice presidential campaign ==
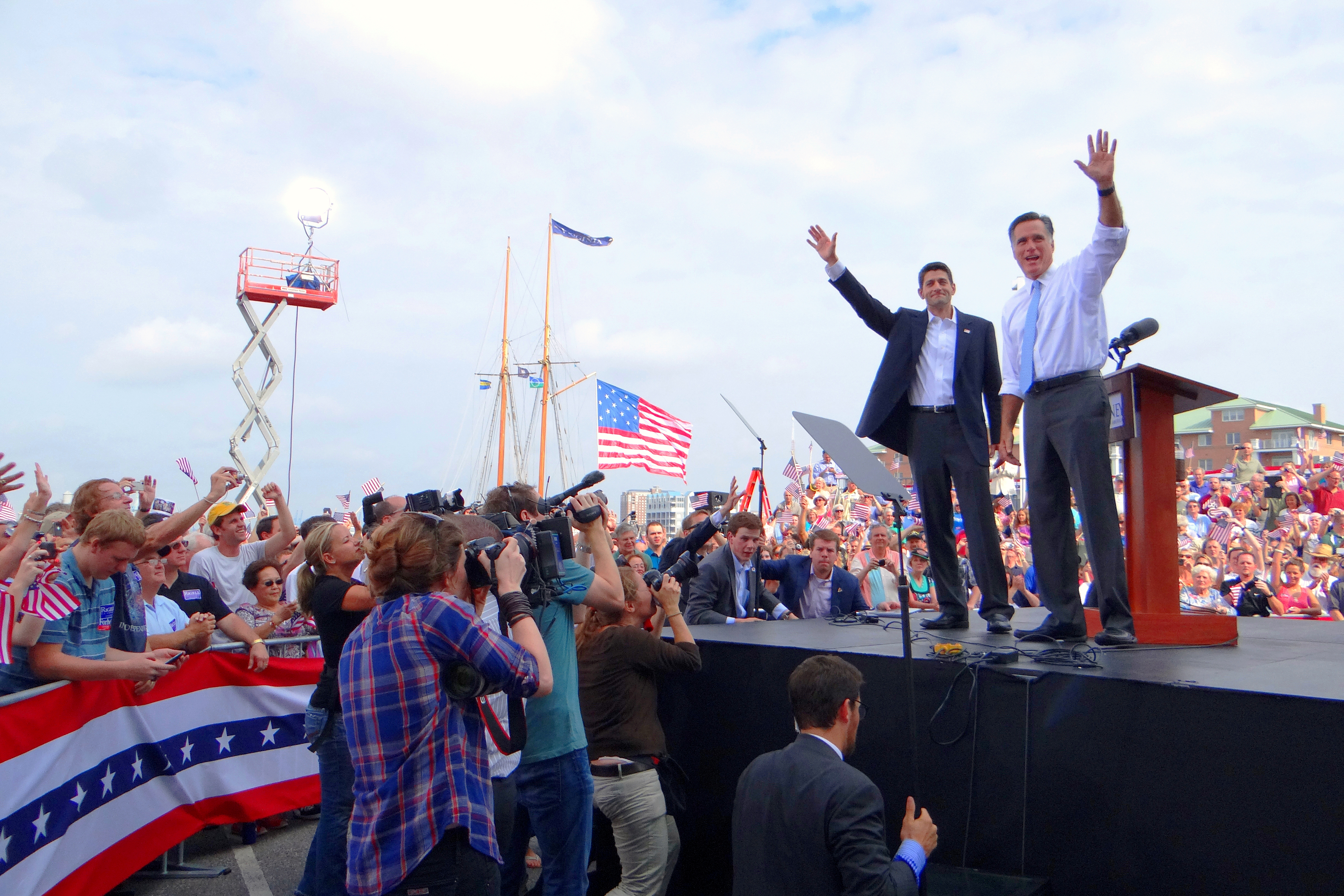
Mitt Romney with Paul Ryan after introducing him as his running mate, for the 2012 presidential election, in Norfolk, Virginia, on August 11, 2012

Dan Balz of The Washington Post wrote that Ryan was promoted as a candidate for vice president "by major elements of the conservative opinion makers, including The Wall Street Journal editorial page, the Weekly Standard and the editor of National Review".

On August 11, 2012, the Romney campaign announced Ryan as its choice for Vice President through its "Mitt's VP" mobile app. It was reported that Romney had offered the position to Ryan on August 1, 2012, the day after returning from a foreign policy trip to the United Kingdom, Poland, and Israel. On August 11, 2012, Ryan formally accepted Romney's invitation to join his campaign as his running mate, in front of the USS Wisconsin in Norfolk. Ryan is the first individual from Wisconsin as well as the first member of Generation X to run on a major party's national ticket.

Also in August 2012, the Associated Press published a story saying that while the Tea Party movement had wanted a nominee other than Romney, it had gotten "one of its ideological heroes" in the vice presidential slot. According to the article, Ryan supports the Tea Party's belief in "individual rights, distrust of big government and an allegorical embrace of the Founding Fathers".

According to a statistical-historical analysis conducted by Nate Silver, "Ryan is the most conservative Republican member of Congress to be picked for the vice-presidential slot since at least 1900" and "is also more conservative than any Democratic nominee [for vice president who previously served in the Congress] was liberal, meaning that he is the furthest from the center" of any vice presidential candidate chosen from Congress since the turn of the 20th century.

Political scientist Eric Schickler commented that while Ryan "may well be the most conservative vice presidential nominee in decades," the NOMINATE methodology "is not suited to making claims about the relative liberalism or conservatism of politicians" over a long time span. A USA Today/Gallup poll found that 39% thought Ryan was an "excellent" or "pretty good" vice presidential choice, compared to 42% who felt he was a "fair" or "poor" choice.

Ryan formally accepted his nomination at the 2012 Republican National Convention on August 29, 2012. In his acceptance speech, he promoted Mitt Romney as the presidential candidate, supported repeal of the Patient Protection and Affordable Care Act (PPACA), said that he and Romney had a plan to generate 12 million new jobs over the ensuing four years, and promoted founding principles as a solution: "We will not duck the tough issues—we will lead. We will not spend four years blaming others—we will take responsibility. We will not try to replace our founding principles, we will reapply our founding principles."

The speech was well received by the convention audience and praised for being well-delivered. Some fact-checkers purported that there were important factual omissions and that he presented details out of context. Conservative media (including Jennifer Rubin of The Washington Post, the Investor's Business Daily, and Fox News) disputed some of the fact-checkers' findings. Of 33 of Ryan's statements which Politifact.com suspected of being false or misleading, it rated 10.5% as True, 18% as Mostly True, 21% as Half True, 36% as Mostly False, 9% as False, and 6% as Pants on Fire. On October 11, 2012, Ryan debated his Democratic counterpart, incumbent Vice President Joe Biden, in the only vice presidential debate of the 2012 election cycle.

Romney and Ryan lost the 2012 presidential election, but Ryan retained his seat in the House of Representatives.

== Speaker of the House ==
=== 114th Congress ===
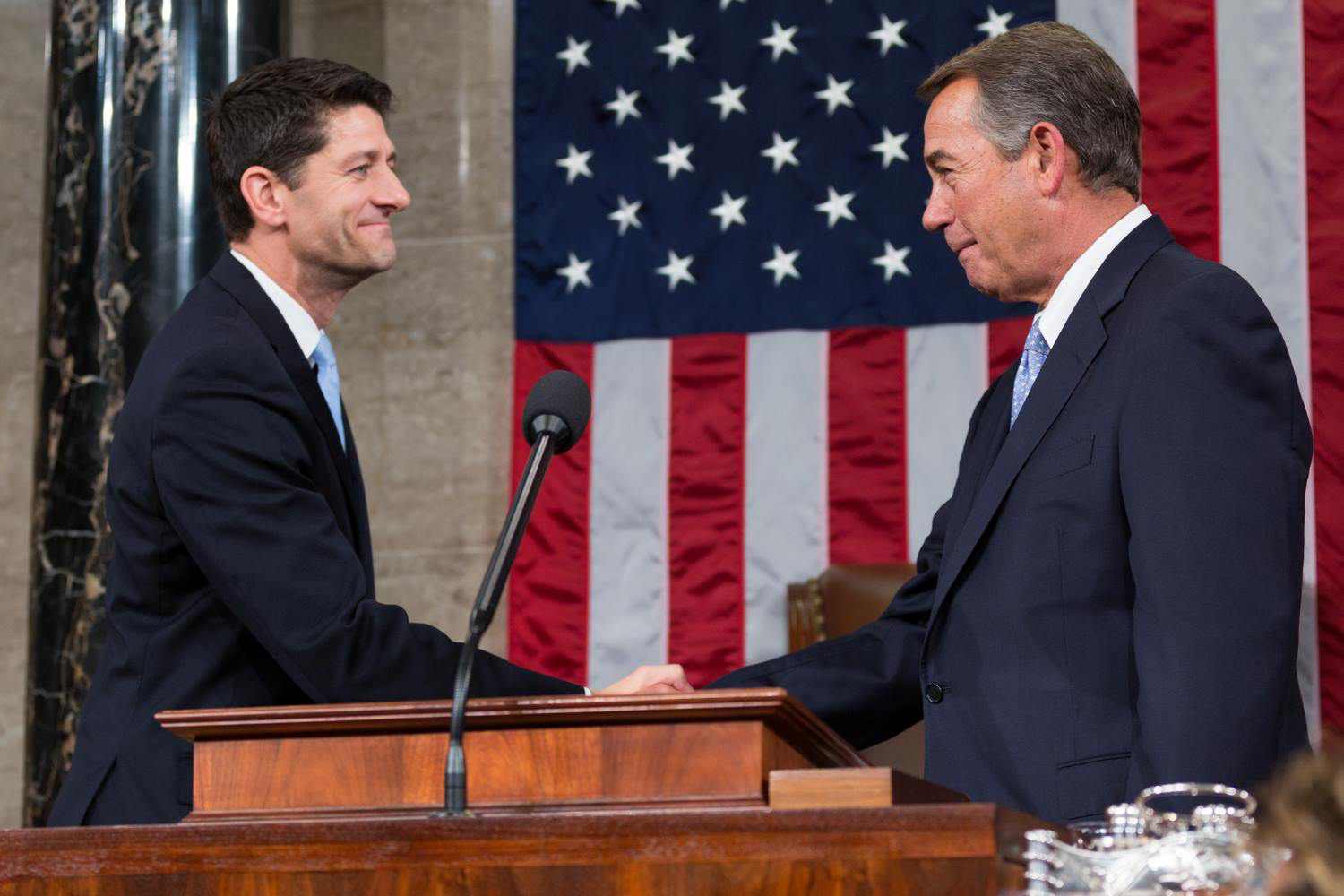
Speaker Ryan (left) shakes hands with outgoing Speaker John Boehner (right).

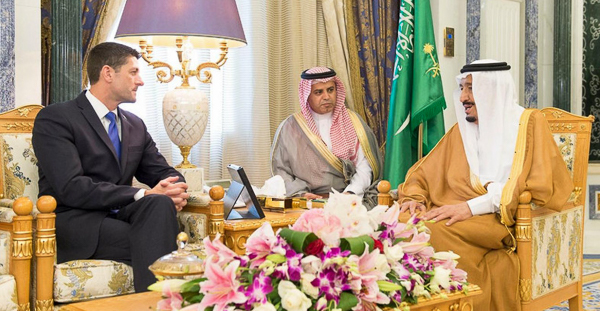
King Salman of Saudi Arabia speaks with Ryan in April 2016.

On September 25, 2015, John Boehner formally announced to House Republicans his intention to resign from the speakership and the House. Among those interested in the post, Kevin McCarthy—who had wide support among Republicans, including Boehner, and Ryan, who was set to officially nominate him—was considered the presumptive favorite. His candidacy was opposed by conservative House Republicans of the Freedom Caucus, and when it became clear that caucus members would not support his candidacy, McCarthy withdrew his name from consideration on October 8. This led many Republicans to turn to Ryan as a compromise candidate. The push included a plea from Boehner, who reportedly told Ryan that he was the only person who could unite the House Republicans at a time of turmoil. Ryan released a statement that said, "While I am grateful for the encouragement I've received, I will not be a candidate." The next day however, close aides of Ryan's confirmed that Ryan had re-evaluated the situation, and was considering the possibility of a run.

Ryan confirmed on October 22, that he would seek the speakership after receiving the endorsements of two factions of House Republicans, including the conservative Freedom Caucus. Ryan, upon confirming his bid for the speakership, stated, "I never thought I'd be speaker. But I pledged to you that if I could be a unifying figure, then I would serve – I would go all in. After talking with so many of you, and hearing your words of encouragement, I believe we are ready to move forward as one, united team. And I am ready and eager to be our speaker."

On October 29, Ryan was elected Speaker, receiving 236 votes, an absolute majority of the 435-member chamber. Democrat Nancy Pelosi received 184 votes, with 12 more going to others. After the vote Ryan delivered his first remarks as speaker-elect and was sworn in by John Conyers, the dean of the House, becoming, at age 45, the youngest person elected as speaker since James G. Blaine (age 39) in 1869. Later, he named lobbyist John David Hoppe as his chief of staff.

Ryan became the leader of the House Republicans upon becoming Speaker. However, by tradition, he largely stopped taking part in debate and made only a few votes from the floor. He was also not a member of any committees.

=== 2016 presidential election ===
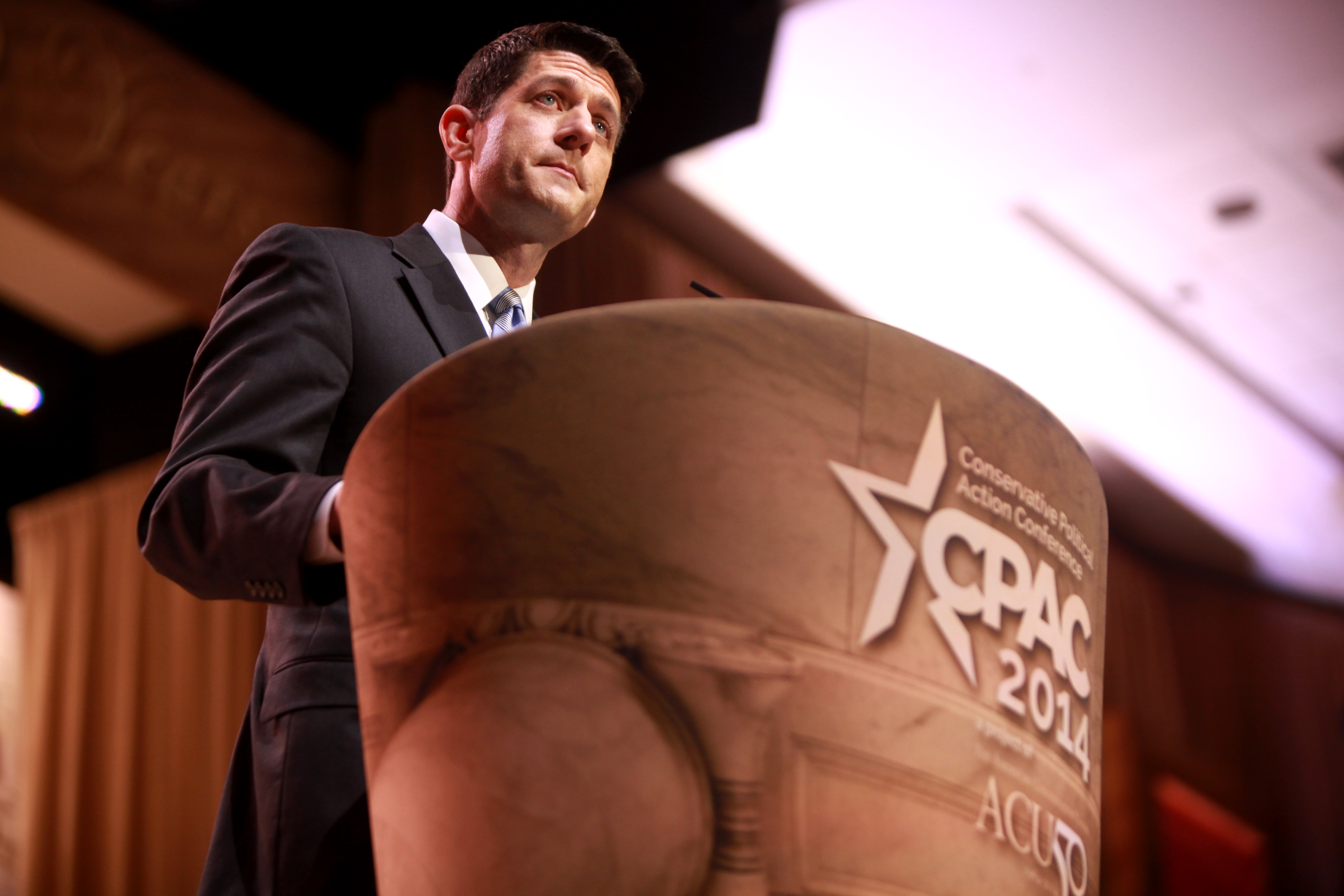
Ryan speaking at CPAC in March 2014

After Donald Trump became the presumptive Republican nominee in the 2016 presidential election on May 4, 2016, Ryan was hesitant to endorse him, stating on May 5 that he was "not ready". Ryan and Trump met in private on May 12, releasing a joint statement afterward, acknowledging their differences but stating "we recognize that there are also many important areas of common ground." On June 2, Ryan announced his support for Trump in an op-ed in The Janesville Gazette.

The following day, June 3, amid Trump's criticism of Judge Gonzalo P. Curiel, Ryan said Trump's critique "just was out of left field for my mind," and voiced disagreement with him. On June 7, Ryan disavowed Trump's comments about Curiel because he believed they were "the textbook definition of a racist comment". Nevertheless, Ryan continued to endorse Trump, believing that more Republican policies will be enacted under Donald Trump than presumptive Democratic nominee Hillary Clinton. On June 15, after Kevin McCarthy stated during a conversation among Republicans, "There's two people I think Putin pays: Rohrabacher and Trump. Swear to God", Ryan interjected, "No leaks. This is how we know we're a real family here."

On July 5, after FBI director James Comey advocated against pressing charges against Clinton for her email scandal, Ryan said Comey's decision "defies explanation" and stated that "[d]eclining to prosecute Secretary Clinton for recklessly mishandling and transmitting national security information will set a terrible precedent."

During the 2016 presidential campaign, Ryan suggested that candidate Trump should release his tax returns.

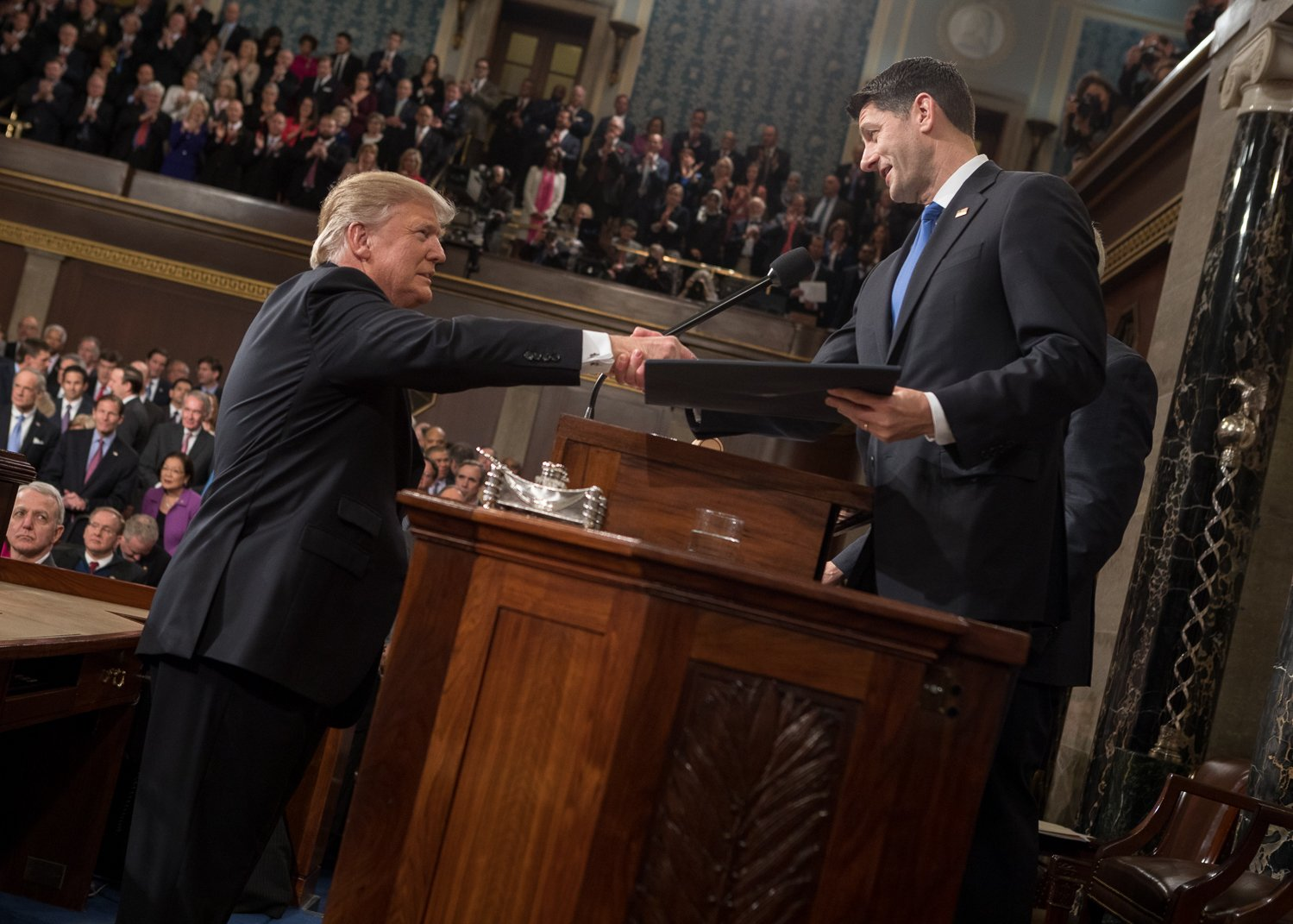
Ryan shaking hands with Donald Trump prior to his address to a joint session of Congress on February 28, 2017

In October 2016, following the Donald Trump Access Hollywood controversy, Ryan disinvited Trump from a scheduled campaign rally, and announced that he would no longer defend or support Trump's presidential campaign but would focus instead on Congressional races. He also freed down-ticket congress members to use their own judgment about Trump, saying "you all need to do what's best for you and your district." Trump then went on to attack Ryan, accusing him and other "disloyal" Republicans of deliberately undermining his candidacy as part of "a whole sinister deal".

=== 115th Congress ===
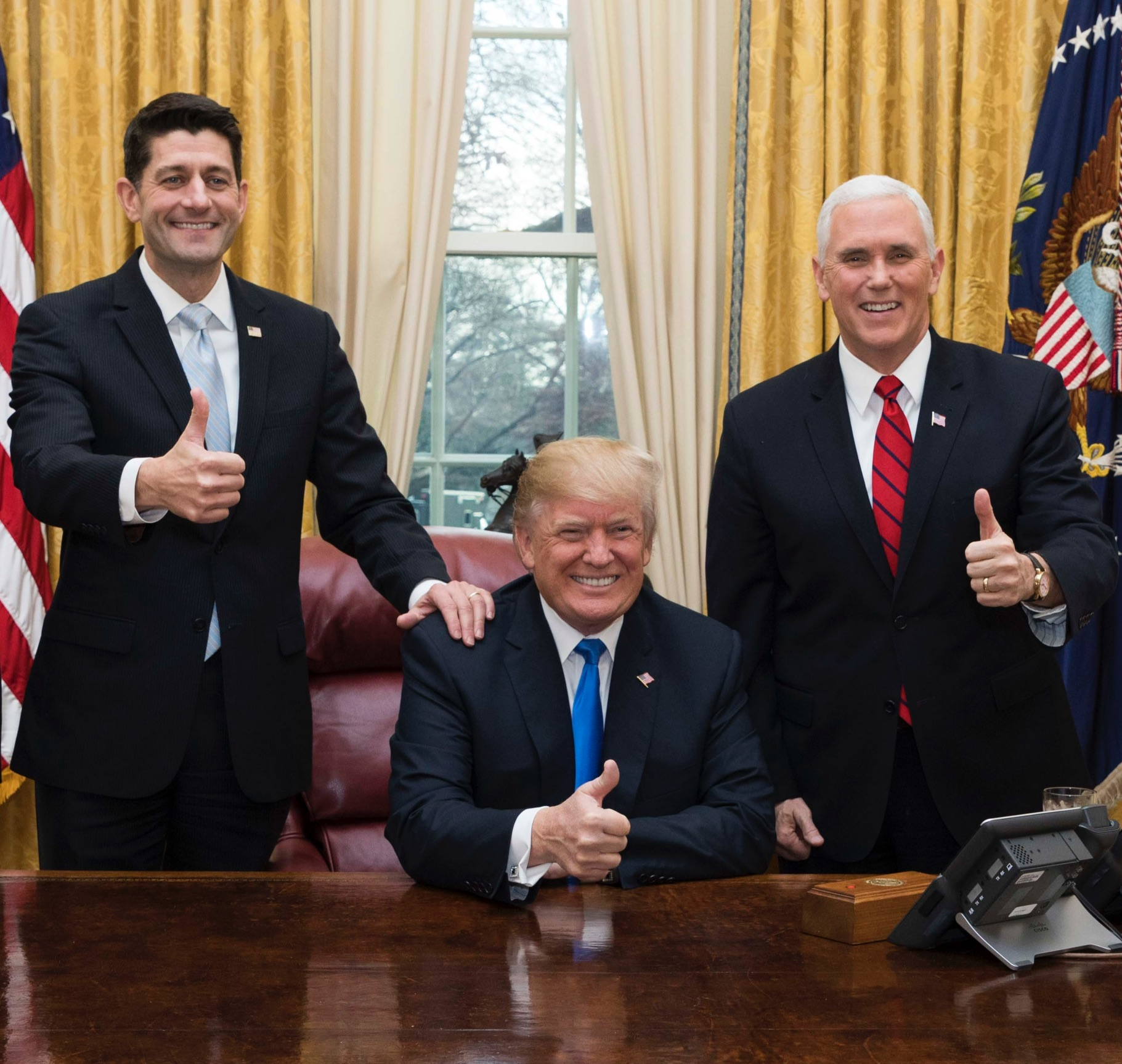
Ryan with Donald Trump and Vice President Mike Pence, December 2017

Two months after the 2016 elections, Ryan was re-elected Speaker of the House on January 3, 2017, the opening day of the 115th Congress. He received 239 votes to House Democratic Leader Pelosi's 189 votes (with 5 more going to others).

On February 7, 2017, Ryan told reporters a replacement for the Affordable Care Act (ACA) would be introduced "this year" amid speculation Donald Trump would not act toward doing so until the following year. On March 9, Ryan gave a 30-minute lecture explaining the proposed replacement for the ACA, titled the American Health Care Act (AHCA). On March 30, Ryan said that he did not intend to work with Democrats on repealing and replacing the ACA, reasoning their involvement would lead to "government running health care." On April 4, Ryan confirmed renewed discussions of an ACA replacement, but warned that a replacement was in the "conceptual" stages of its development. On May 4, the House narrowly voted for the AHCA to repeal the ACA. On May 9, Ryan said that "a month or two" would pass before the Senate would pass its own ACA repeal and replacement legislation. The Senate created several of its own versions of the act but was unable to pass any of them.

In May 2017, Ryan said Congress' goal was "calendared 2017 for tax reform" and reported progress was being made in doing so. In December 2017, both houses of Congress passed a $1.5 trillion tax bill called the Tax Cuts and Jobs Act of 2017, which Trump signed into law on December 22. The tax law is projected to add an additional $1.5 trillion to the national debt over a decade, but the nonpartisan Joint Committee on Taxation also estimated that the GDP level on average would be 0.7% higher during the same period. In the weeks leading up to his retirement announcement, Ryan also championed a $1.3 trillion government-wide spending bill that boosted military spending significantly. Politico noted that Ryan "clamored for austerity when he's been in the minority, trashing Democrats as profligate budget-busters, but he's happily busted budgets in the majority."

In June 2017, Ryan expressed support for strong sanctions on Russia in response to Russian interference in the 2016 elections and its annexation of the Crimea, saying that Russia's actions were "unacceptable". He urged Special Counsel Robert Mueller and Congressional oversight committees to "do their jobs so that we can get to the bottom of all of this." In July Congress passed a bill imposing new sanctions on Russia and giving Congress the power to overrule White House attempts to roll back sanctions. Both houses passed the bill with veto-proof majorities (98–2 in the Senate, 419–3 in the House), so Trump reluctantly signed it into law on August 2, 2017.

Ryan provided political cover for Devin Nunes, chair of the House Intelligence Committee, who many characterized as a source of the dysfunction in the committee as it investigated Russian interference in the 2016 election. Nunes accused the Obama administration of improperly "unmasking" the identities of Trump associates (which led Nunes' temporary recusal from the committee's Russia investigation), accused the FBI of misconduct, leaked the text messages of Senator Mark Warner (in an effort to misleadingly suggest impropriety on his behalf), and threatened to impeach FBI director Christopher Wray and Deputy Attorney General Rod Rosenstein. The House Intelligence Committee was one of few so-called "select" committees in Congress, which meant that it was up to Ryan to decide the chairman of the committee.

Despite having favored comprehensive immigration earlier in his congressional career, Speaker Ryan prevented immigration legislation from being advanced in the House. When President Trump ended Deferred Action for Childhood Arrivals (DACA) – which granted temporary stay for undocumented immigrants brought into the United States as minors – Ryan said DACA recipients should "rest easy" because Congress would solve the problem for them, but Ryan backed no bills to protect DACA recipients.

An article in The Washington Post described Ryan's relationship with President Trump as "friendly, if occasionally uneasy," adding that "Ryan did little to check the president or encourage oversight of his administration." Ryan supported Trump's firing of FBI Director James Comey, and did not support legislation to protect Special Counsel Robert Mueller's investigation into Russian interference in the 2016 election. Ryan said that legislation to protect Mueller's investigation was not "necessary".

On April 11, 2018, Ryan announced that he would not run for re-election in November, saying, "I like to think I've done my part, my little part in history to set us on a better course." In response, Trump tweeted, "Speaker Paul Ryan is a truly good man, and while he will not be seeking re-election, he will leave a legacy of achievement that nobody can question."

In May 2018, Ryan led the House in passing the Economic Growth, Regulatory Relief and Consumer Protection Act, which partially repealed the Dodd-Frank Act. It was signed into law by President Trump a few days later.

After Republicans lost control of the House in the 2018 midterm elections, Ryan suggested that there were irregularities about the election results in California. Ryan said that California's election system was "bizarre", "defies logic" and that "there are a lot of races there we should have won." After Ryan's remarks were reported on, Ryan's spokesperson said "The Speaker did not and does not dispute the results".

=== Assessment of Speaker tenure ===
Following Ryan's retirement announcement, an article in The Washington Post stated that Ryan was "leav[ing] behind a legacy of dramatically expanded government spending and immense deficits, a GOP president unchecked, a broken immigration system, and a party that's fast abandoning the free-trade principles that he himself championed." According to the Associated Press, Ryan "achieved one of his career goals: rewriting the tax code"; however, "on his other defining aim—balancing the budget and cutting back benefit programs like Social Security, Medicare and Medicaid—Ryan has utterly failed".

=== Constituent services ===
In fiscal year 2008, Ryan garnered $5.4 million in congressional earmarks, including $3.28 million for bus service in Wisconsin, $1.38 million for the Ice Age Trail, and $735,000 for the Janesville transit system. In 2009, he successfully advocated with the Department of Energy for stimulus funds for energy initiatives in his district.

Other home district projects he has supported include a runway extension at the Southern Wisconsin Regional Airport, an environmental study of the Kenosha Harbor, firefighting equipment for Janesville, road projects in Wisconsin, and commuter rail and streetcar projects in Kenosha. In 2008, Ryan pledged to stop seeking earmarks. Prior to that he had sought earmarks less often than other representatives. Taxpayers for Common Sense records show no earmarks supported by Ryan for fiscal years 2009 and 2010. In 2012, Ryan supported a request for $3.8 million from the Department of Transportation for a new transit center in Janesville, which city officials received in July.

Ryan was an active member of a task force established by Wisconsin governor Jim Doyle that tried unsuccessfully to persuade General Motors to keep its assembly plant in Janesville open. He made personal contact with GM executives to try to convince them to save or retool the plant, offering GM hundreds of millions of dollars of taxpayer-funded incentives. Following the closure of factories in Janesville and Kenosha, constituents expressed dissatisfaction with Ryan's voting history. During the 2011 congressional summer break, Ryan held town hall meetings by telephone with constituents. The only public meetings Ryan attended in his district required an admission fee of at least $15.

In August 2011, constituents in Kenosha and Racine protested when Ryan would not meet with them about economic and employment issues, after weeks of emailed requests from them. His Kenosha office locked its doors and filed a complaint with the police, who told the protesters that they were not allowed in Ryan's office.

Ryan maintained a mobile office to serve constituents in outlying areas.

== Congressional Leadership Fund ==
The Congressional Leadership Fund (CLF), a Super PAC, has been closely linked and aligned with Ryan. Ryan has directed major GOP donors towards the CLF.

== Political positions ==
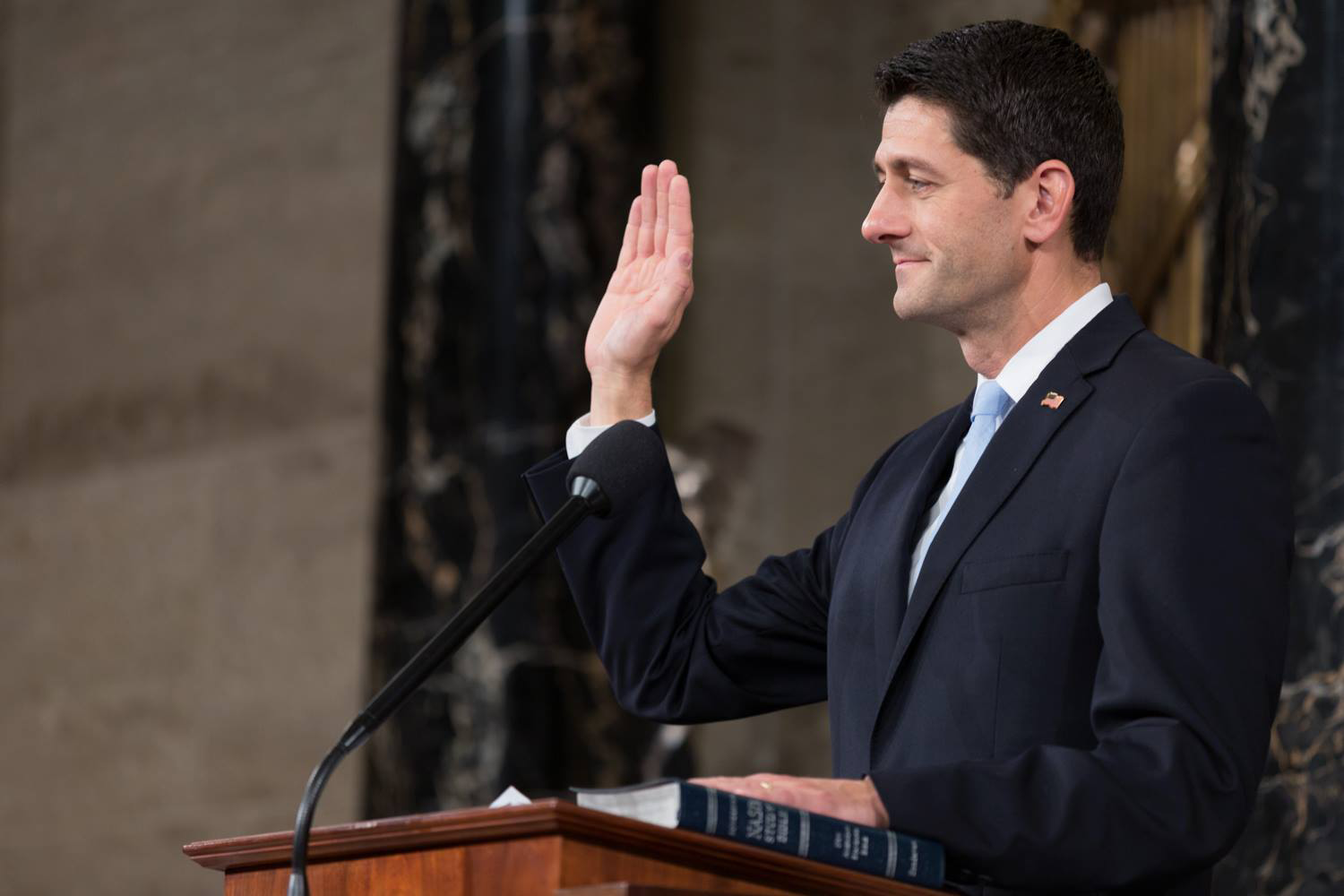
Ryan takes his oath of office following his election as Speaker on October 29, 2015.

Ryan's political positions were generally conservative, with a focus on fiscal policy. Ryan "played a central role in nearly all" the policy debates of the period 2010–2012. In 2012, Ryan voted against the Simpson–Bowles commission proposal to reduce the deficit, because the proposal raised taxes and failed to repeal the Affordable Care Act. While he was a self-proclaimed deficit hawk, Ryan's tenure of Speaker of the House saw a major expansion in government spending and a ballooning of deficits despite unified Republican control of Congress and the White House, no recession and no new foreign conflict.

Ryan subscribed to supply-side economics and supported tax cuts including eliminating the capital gains tax, the corporate income tax, the estate tax, and the Alternative Minimum Tax. Ryan supports deregulation, including the Gramm–Leach–Bliley Act of 1999, which repealed some financial regulation of banks from the Glass–Steagall Act of 1933. During the economic recovery from the Great Recession of the late 2000s, Ryan supported the Troubled Asset Relief Program (TARP), which authorized the Treasury to purchase toxic assets from banks and other financial institutions, and the auto industry bailout; Ryan opposed the Credit CARD Act of 2009, which expanded consumer protections regarding credit card plans, and the Dodd–Frank Wall Street Reform and Consumer Protection Act, which strengthened financial regulation. In 2018 as House Speaker, Ryan helped pass the Economic Growth, Regulatory Relief and Consumer Protection Act that repealed large parts of Dodd-Frank.

In 2016, Ryan rolled out a set of anti-poverty proposals that "seek to expand work requirements for those receiving federal benefits, to give states and local jurisdictions a greater role in administering those benefits, to better measure the results of federal programs for the poor, and to crack down on waste, fraud and abuse." Ryan believes federal poverty reduction programs are ineffective and he supports cuts to welfare, child care, Pell Grants, food stamps, and other federal assistance programs. Ryan supports block granting Medicaid to the states and the privatization of social security and Medicare. Ryan supported the Medicare Part D prescription drug benefit and opposes the Patient Protection and Affordable Care Act (ACA), also known as "Obamacare." Ryan supported the American Health Care Act of 2017 (AHCA), the 2017 House Republican plan to repeal and replace the ACA. In 2012, The New York Times said Ryan was "his party's most forceful spokesman for cutting entitlement spending."

Ryan's non-fiscal policy positions were subject to additional national attention with his 2012 candidacy for vice president. Ryan is pro-life and opposes abortion rights. Ryan opposed the Lilly Ledbetter Fair Pay Act of 2009, which provides that the 180-day statute of limitations for filing an equal-pay lawsuit regarding pay discrimination resets with each new paycheck affected by that discriminatory action. In 2012, Ryan supported civil unions and opposed same-sex marriage.

Ryan supported school vouchers, and supported the No Child Left Behind Act in 2001 and its repeal the Every Student Succeeds Act in 2015. Ryan is unsure, and believes climate scientists are unsure, of the impact of human activity on climate change. Ryan supported tax incentives for the petroleum industry and opposed them for renewable energy. Ryan supported gun rights and opposed stricter gun control. Ryan supported the wars in Iraq and Afghanistan.

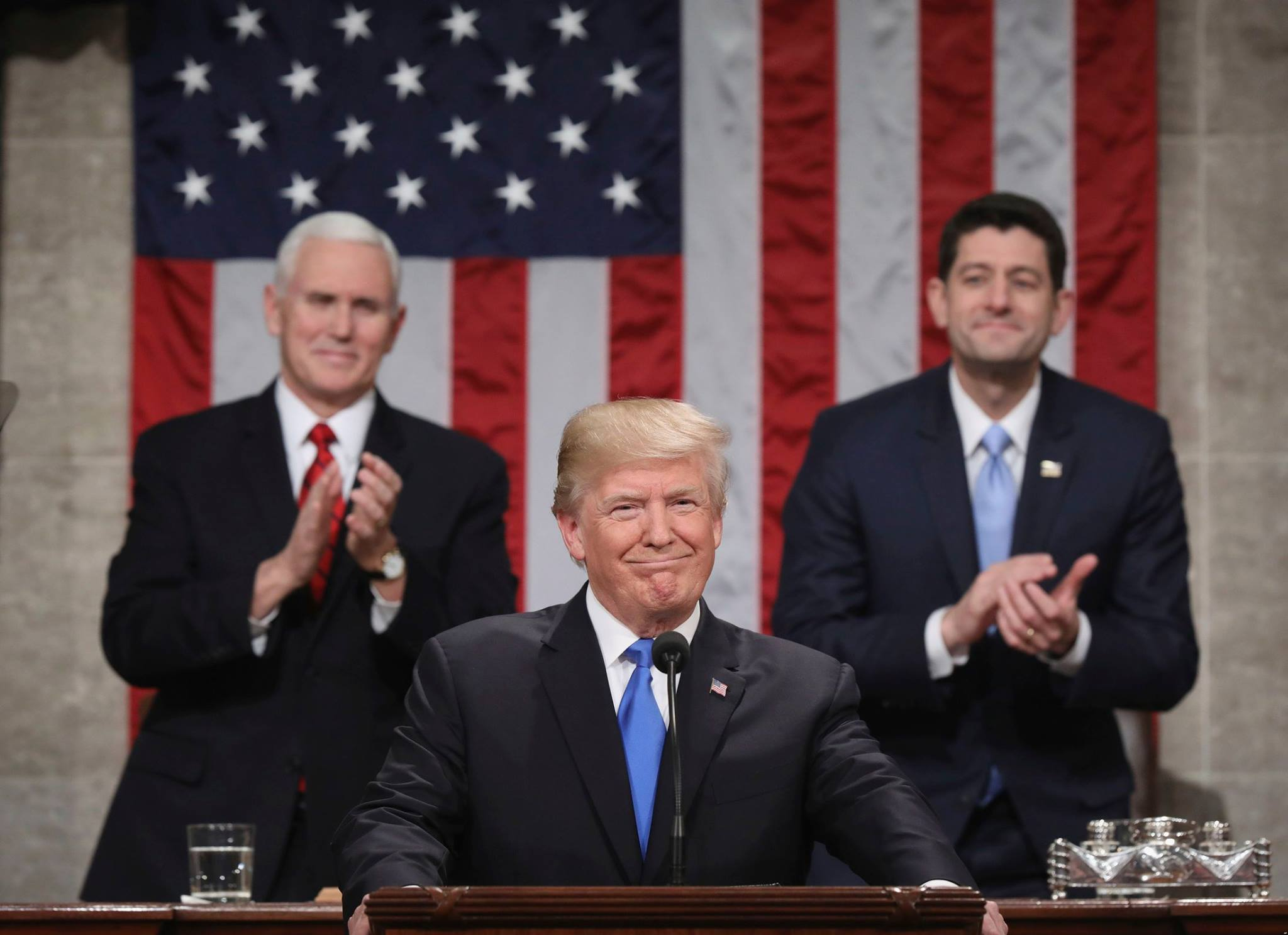
Ryan with President Donald Trump and Vice President Mike Pence, January 2018

Ryan condemned Barack Obama's decision not to block a UN resolution criticizing Israeli settlement building in the occupied Palestinian territories as "absolutely shameful". Ryan supported President Donald Trump's decision to recognize Jerusalem as Israel's capital. He stated: "Jerusalem has been, and always will be, the eternal, undivided capital of the State of Israel."

Following the 2018 Russia–United States Summit, in which Donald Trump stated that he believed Russian government did not interfere in the 2016 U.S. presidential election, Ryan confirmed his belief that Russian government interfered and advocated for more economic sanctions against Russia for the interference.

Ryan supported U.S. involvement in the Saudi-led intervention in the Yemeni civil war and used his power to block a House vote on the war in Yemen.

In a 2022 interview, Ryan described himself as a "Never-Again Trumper". While he was "proud of the accomplishments [during the Trump administration]", Ryan highlighted how under Trump, the Republican Party lost elections in 2018, 2020, and 2022, and said that the party should thus distance itself from Trump. A year later, Ryan would deride Trump as a "populist, authoritarian narcissist" and "not a conservative." In June 2024, Ryan stated he would not vote for Trump in the 2024 presidential election, instead planning to write-in another candidate because of Trump's lack of "character." Prior to the Republican primaries, Ryan privately encouraged Congressman Mike Gallagher to support Nikki Haley's presidential campaign.

=== History with Objectivism ===
At a 2005 Washington, D.C., gathering celebrating the 100th anniversary of Ayn Rand's birth, Ryan credited Rand with having inspired him to get involved in politics. In a speech that same year at The Atlas Society, he said he grew up reading Rand, and that her books taught him about his value system and beliefs. Ryan required staffers and interns in his congressional office to read Rand, and gave copies of her novel Atlas Shrugged as gifts to his staff for Christmas. In his Atlas Society speech, he also described Social Security as a "socialist-based system".

In 2009, Ryan said, "What's unique about what's happening today in government, in the world, in America, is that it's as if we're living in an Ayn Rand novel right now. I think Ayn Rand did the best job of anybody to build a moral case of capitalism, and that morality of capitalism is under assault."

In April 2012, after receiving criticism from Georgetown University faculty members on his budget plan, Ryan rejected Rand's philosophy of Objectivism as atheistic, saying it "reduces human interactions down to mere contracts". He also called the reports of his adherence to Rand's views an "urban legend" and stated that he was instead deeply influenced by his Catholic faith and by Thomas Aquinas.

== Electoral history ==
2015 election for Speaker (Special) – 114th Congress
Party	Candidate	Votes	%
Republican	Paul Ryan (WI 1)	236	54.63
Democratic	Nancy Pelosi (CA 12)	184	42.60
Republican	Dan Webster (FL 10)	9	2.08
Democratic	Jim Cooper (TN 5)	1	0.23
Democratic	John Lewis (GA 5)	1	0.23
Republican	Colin Powell	1	0.23
Total votes		432	100
Votes necessary		217	>50

2017 election for Speaker – 115th Congress * denotes incumbent
Party	Candidate	Votes	%
Republican	Paul Ryan* (WI 1)	239	55.19
Democratic	Nancy Pelosi (CA 12)	189	43.65
Democratic	Tim Ryan (OH 13)	2	0.47
Democratic	Jim Cooper (TN 5)	1	0.23
Democratic	John Lewis (GA 5)	1	0.23
Republican	Dan Webster (FL 10)	1	0.23
Total votes		433	100
Votes necessary		217	>50

== Post-congressional life ==
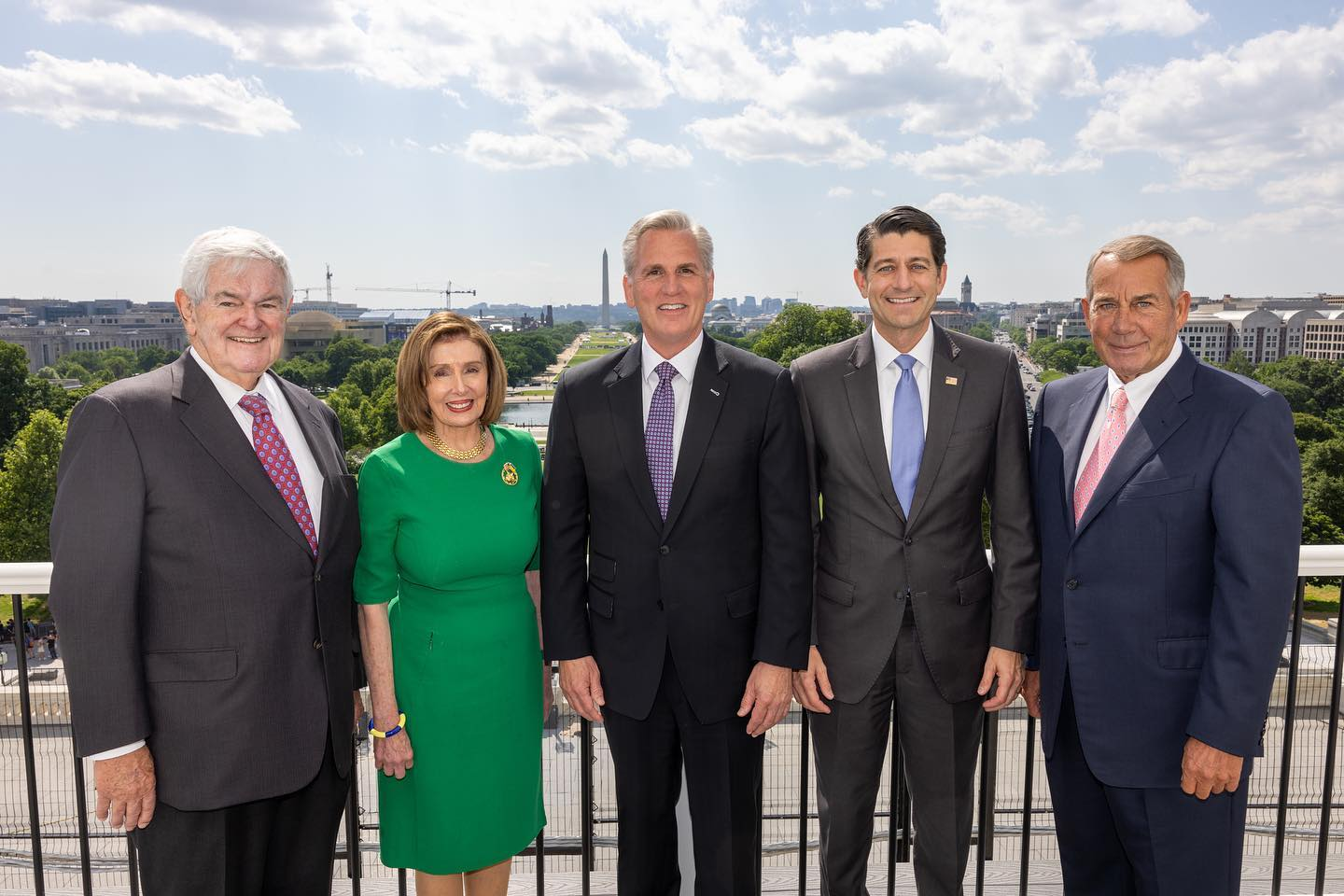
Ryan with speakers in 2023

In March 2019, Ryan joined the board of directors of Fox Corporation, the owner of Fox News Channel and the Fox broadcast network. In August 2019, he joined the board of SHINE Medical Technologies. He was a guest lecturer in political science and economics at the University of Notre Dame for the 2019–2020 academic year. In April 2019, Ryan was nominated as the delegation leader to represent President Trump in a visit to Taipei. With Taiwanese President Tsai Ing-wen, he attended the 40th-anniversary ceremony of the Taiwan Relations Act. In October 2019, Ryan launched a non-profit called American Idea Foundation.

In October 2020, Ryan joined the public relations and advisory company Teneo as a senior advisor. In February 2021 he became a partner in the Boston private equity investment firm Solamere Capital.

On May 17, 2023, Ryan unveiled his official portrait at the U.S. Capitol during a ceremony in Statuary Hall. During his speech, he said, "Only in America would it be possible for a kid from Janesville to go from an intern to the Speaker of the House."

== Personal life ==
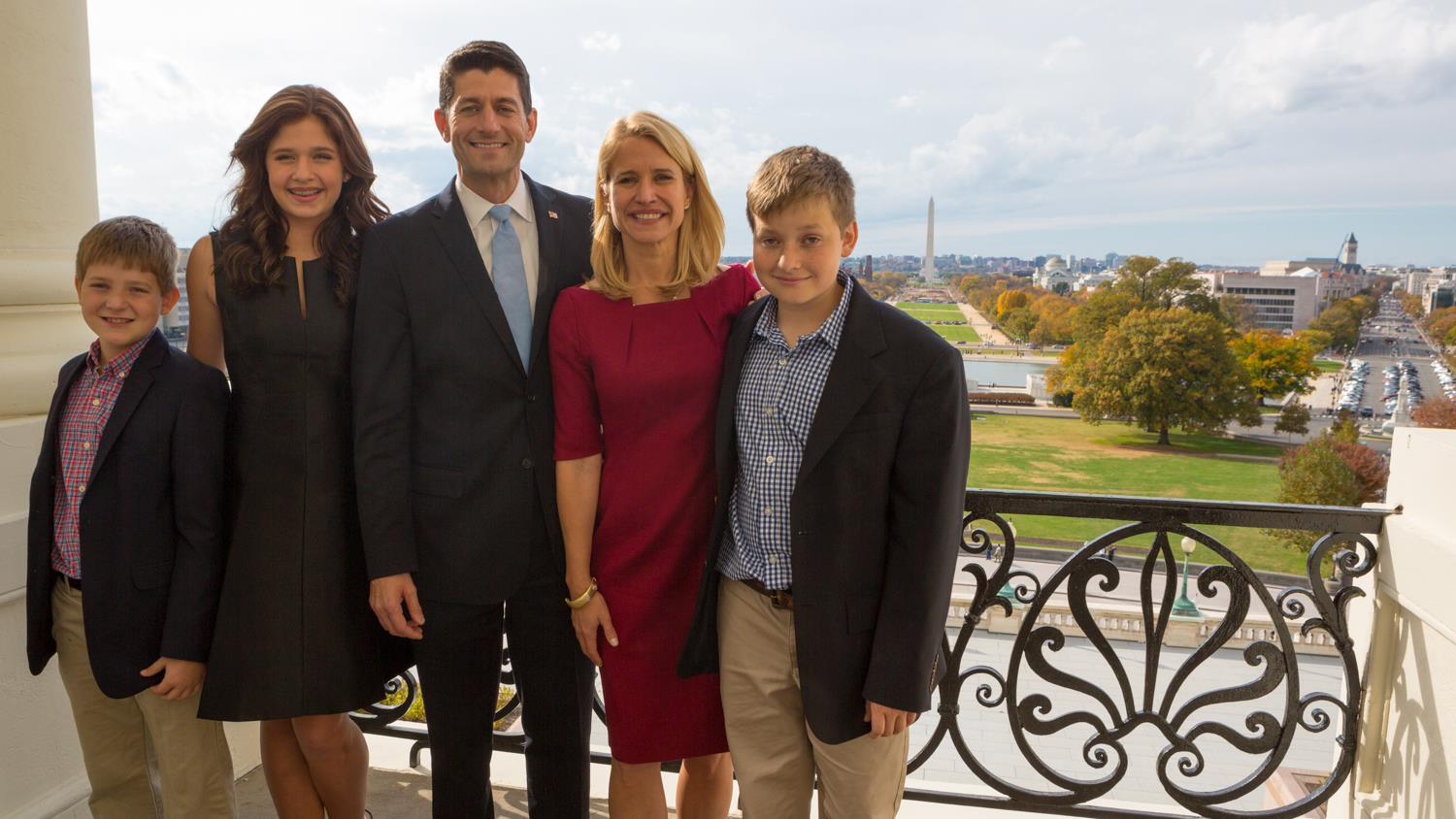
Ryan with his wife and family on the Speaker's balcony at the U.S. Capitol, following his election in October 2015

In December 2000, Ryan married Janna Christine Little who is a tax attorney. Janna Ryan is a native of Madill, Oklahoma, and a graduate of both Wellesley College and George Washington University Law School. The Ryans live in the Courthouse Hill Historic District of Janesville, Wisconsin. They have three children: Elizabeth "Liza" Anne, Charles Wilson, and Samuel Lowery. Ryan is a member of St. John Vianney Catholic Church in Janesville.

Janna is a cousin of former Democratic Representative Dan Boren (D-OK). She is also a granddaughter of Reuel Little, who helped found the American Party to support the 1968 presidential campaign of George Wallace. Through his marriage, Ryan is related to Supreme Court justice Ketanji Brown Jackson.

Due to a family history of fatal heart attacks before age 60, Ryan is involved in an intense cross-training fitness program called P90X. He has always been a fitness enthusiast and was a personal trainer after graduating from college. Speaking of P90X he said, "It works because it's called muscle confusion. It hits your body in many different ways. Pull-ups, push-ups, sit-ups, lots of cardio, karate, jump training. It has results, it works. It's a good workout."

In a 2010 Politico interview he stated that he weighed 163 pounds and maintained his body fat percentage between 6% and 8%. Tony Horton, creator of P90X, who has personally trained Ryan many times, reiterated the claim saying, "He is very, very, very lean. I know what 6 to 8 percent body fat looks like, and there's no fat anywhere on the man. I'm around 9 percent and he's much leaner than I am. He's easily 6 to 8 percent body fat. You just have to eat right and exercise every day, and that’s what he does."

During a 2012 radio interview, Ryan claimed he had once run a marathon in under three hours; he later said he forgot his actual time and was just trying to give what he thought was a normal time. His one official marathon time is recorded as slightly over four hours.

== Awards and honors ==
- 2004, 2010 – Guardian of Small Business Award, National Federation of Independent Business
- 2008 – Defending the American Dream Award, Americans for Prosperity, Wisconsin chapter
- 2009 – Manufacturing Legislative Excellence Award, National Association of Manufacturers
- 2009 – Honorary Degree, Miami University
- 2010 – Legislator of the Year Award, International Franchise Association
- 2011 – Statesmanship Award, Claremont Institute
- 2011 – Fiscy Award for responsible financial stewardship and fiscal discipline in government.
- 2011 – Leadership Award, Jack Kemp Foundation
- 2011 – Freedom and Prosperity Award, Mason Contractors Association of America
- 2012 – Chair, Honorary Board of the Archery Trade Association
- 2014 – Alexander Hamilton Award, Manhattan Institute for Policy Research
- 2018 – Department of Defense Medal for Distinguished Public Service

U.S. House of Representatives
Preceded by Mark Neumann	Member of the U.S. House of Representatives from Wisconsin's 1st congressional district 1999–2019	Succeeded by Bryan Steil
Preceded by John Spratt	Ranking Member of the House Budget Committee; 2007–2011	Succeeded by Chris Van Hollen
Preceded by John Spratt	Chair of the House Budget Committee; 2011–2015	Succeeded by Tom Price
Preceded by Dave Camp	Chair of the House Ways and Means Committee; 2015	Succeeded by Sam Johnson; Acting
Preceded by Ron Wyden	Chair of the Joint Taxation Committee; 2015	Succeeded by Sam Johnson; Acting
Party political offices
Preceded by Bob McDonnell	Response to the State of the Union address 2011	Succeeded by Mitch Daniels
Preceded by Sarah Palin	Republican nominee for Vice President of the United States; 2012	Succeeded by Mike Pence
Preceded by John Boehner	House Republican Leader; 2015–2019	Succeeded by Kevin McCarthy
Political offices
Preceded by John Boehner	Speaker of the U.S. House of Representatives; 2015–2019	Succeeded by Nancy Pelosi
U.S. order of precedence (ceremonial)
Preceded by John Boehner as Former Speaker of the U.S. House of Representatives	Order of precedence of the United States as Former Speaker of the U.S. House of Representatives	Succeeded by Kevin McCarthy as Former Speaker of the U.S. House of Representatives
