= Some Bright Nowhere =

2025 novel by American author Ann Packer

- Author: Ann Packer
- Language: English
- Genre: Literary fiction, domestic drama
- Publisher: Harper
- Publication date: November 11, 2025
- Media type: Print (hardcover), audiobook, e‑book
- Pages: 256
- ISBN: 9780063421493

Some Bright Nowhere is a 2025 novel by American author Ann Packer. Published by Harper, the book was selected as Oprah Winfrey's 120th Book Club pick in November 2025.

== Plot ==
The novel opens with Claire, a woman in her sixties, attending her final appointment with her oncologist after eight years of treatment for terminal cancer. The story is told from the perspective of her husband, Eliot, who has cared for her throughout her illness. When Claire's two best friends, Holly and Michelle, come to visit, she reveals a dying wish: she wants them to care for her during her final weeks, and she asks Eliot to move out of their home. Eliot agrees, though he is shocked and hurt by the request. He continues to visit daily and handle many caregiving tasks, but the emotional distance between the couple widens.

The narrative follows the shifting dynamics among Eliot, Claire, and her friends as Claire's condition deteriorates. Eliot struggles with uncertainty about how much time his wife has left, repeatedly contacting hospice nurses for answers they cannot provide. Claire, meanwhile, maintains that her decision has nothing to do with her love for her husband. Their adult children, Josh and Abby, observe from the sidelines as the family navigates the final stages of Claire's illness.

== Themes ==
The novel examines end‑of‑life care, the nature of marriage, and the difference between spousal and friendship bonds. It explores questions of agency and control at the end of life, as Claire seeks to shape her final days on her own terms. The story also considers the emotional toll of caregiving and the ways in which terminal illness reshapes long‑established relationships.

== Publication ==
Some Bright Nowhere was published on November 11, 2025, by Harper, an imprint of HarperCollins Publishers. The book was released in hardcover, audiobook, and e‑book formats.

The novel was selected as Oprah Winfrey's 120th Book Club pick, announced on CBS Mornings in November 2025. Winfrey described it as "a beautifully written story" that would prompt readers to consider "one of the most significant of questions: How do you want to spend your last days?".

== Reception ==
Kirkus Reviews called the novel "harrowing, but brilliant," praising Packer's "diamond‑hard dissections of tangled personal relations" and noting that the final pages are "as deliberately unresolved as the rest of the novel."

The New York Times described the book as "slyly solemn and skillfully surprising," highlighting the narrative's reliance on the actions of the dying patient rather than flashbacks or buried secrets. The Star Tribune characterized the novel as "infuriating, and it's supposed to be," noting Packer's gift for depicting the undercurrents of emotion in long‑term relationships. NPR's Mary Louise Kelly interviewed Packer about the novel, discussing Claire's request and its implications for the couple's marriage.
