= The Unwinding =

2013 non-fiction book by the American journalist George Packer

The Unwinding: An Inner History of the New America
- Author: George Packer
- Language: English
- Published: 2013 (Farrar, Straus and Giroux)
- Publication place: United States
- Pages: 448 pp (first edition)
- Awards: National Book Award for Nonfiction
- ISBN: 978-0374102418

The Unwinding: An Inner History of the New America is a 2013 non-fiction book by the American journalist George Packer. The book uses biographies of individual Americans as a means of discussing important forces in American history from 1978 to 2012, including the subprime mortgage crisis, the decline of American manufacturing, and the influence of money on politics. The Unwinding includes lengthy profiles of five subjects: a Youngstown, Ohio factory worker turned community organizer, a biodiesel entrepreneur from North Carolina, a Washington lobbyist and Congressional staffer, the Silicon Valley entrepreneur Peter Thiel, and people involved in the distressed housing market in Tampa, Florida. Interspersed with these longer accounts are ten briefer biographical sketches of famous Americans such as the rapper Jay-Z, the politician Newt Gingrich, and the restaurateur and food activist Alice Waters.

In an interview with PBS NewsHour, Packer defined the book's theme as the unraveling of

"a contract that said if you work hard, if you essentially are a good citizen, there will be a place for you, not only an economic place, you will have a secure life, your kids will have a chance to have a better life, but you will sort of be recognized as part of the national fabric."

The Unwinding follows the decline of a number of American institutions that Packer believes underpinned this contract, including locally owned businesses, unions, and public schools. According to Packer, the "void" left by the decline of these institutions "was filled by the default force in American life, organized money."

The book's format and style were inspired by John Dos Passos' U.S.A. trilogy, a series of novels published in the 1930s. Like The Unwinding, the U.S.A. trilogy combined longer narrative accounts of its main characters with short biographies of influential figures of the time period and collections of newspaper headlines and song lyrics.

The Unwinding won the 2013 National Book Award for Nonfiction and was a finalist for the 2013 National Book Critics Circle Award.

== Contents ==
=== Jeff Connaughton ===
Jeff Connaughton began a decades-long affiliation with Senator Joe Biden in 1979 when, as a student at the University of Alabama, he invited the Senator to speak to a campus group. Connaughton was so impressed by Biden that he committed to working for Biden if the Senator ever ran for president. After earning an M.B.A. degree and working for a few years in the financial industry, Connaughton joined Biden's 1988 presidential campaign as a fundraiser. After the campaign imploded, Connaughton found a job on the staff of the Senate Judiciary Committee. He later worked for Abner Mikva in the White House Counsel's office during the Clinton administration. Although Connaughton was identified in Washington as a "Biden guy" he was deeply disappointed with what he perceived as ingratitude by Biden – for instance, the Senator refused to call Mikva to recommend Connaughton. Still, after leaving the White House, Connaughton parlayed his connections into a career as a lobbyist for the firm Quinn Gillespie & Associates, representing clients such as Laurent Gbagbo, the President of the Ivory Coast. Connaughton held frequent fundraisers for politicians in order to gain access to their offices.

When Biden became vice president and Ted Kaufman, Biden's former Chief of Staff was appointed to fill Biden's Senate seat, Connaughton went to work for Kaufman. Together, Kaufman and Connaughton worked on reform of the financial services industry in the wake of the Great Recession. They encouraged criminal prosecution of financial fraud cases as well as limits to the size of banks, but met with limited success. Connaughton found that the lobbyists he used to work with had better information and more input on financial reform regulation than he had as a Senate aide. Connaughton believed that advocates for U.S. financial system reform, such as the group Americans for Financial Reform, were being overwhelmed by industry lobbyists. After Kaufman's term ended, Connaughton, disillusioned with Obama/Biden and Washington, moved to Savannah, Georgia and published a memoir of his experiences, The Payoff: Why Wall Street Always Wins.

A version of this section of The Unwinding was published in The New Yorker, where Packer is a staff writer.

=== Dean Price ===
Dean Price came from a family of tobacco farmers in the Piedmont Triad region of North Carolina. A devotee of the self-help books of Napoleon Hill, Price opened a number of fast-food restaurants, convenience stores and gas stations along U.S. Route 220. Price witnessed the decline in the 1990s of all three of the region's important industries: tobacco, textiles and furniture. After Hurricane Katrina led to diesel shortages, Price became enamored with the idea of biodiesel. He believed that biodiesel, made from locally-grown crops, could help struggling local farmers while also avoiding what he believed would be the catastrophic consequences of peak oil. With partners, Price founded a business that would refine locally-grown canola into biodiesel, which was then sold at Price's gas stations. This was the first establishment of its kind in the country and it attracted the attention of the local Congressman, Tom Perriello and the Obama Administration. However, Price's restaurants and gas stations failed amidst the Great Recession and Price lost control of the biodiesel company. After these failures, Price began a new venture: using used cooking oil from restaurants to provide fuel for local school buses.

=== Tammy Thomas ===
Tammy Thomas is an African American woman from Youngstown, Ohio. The child of a heroin addict, she was raised by her great-grandmother, a maid. Thomas witnessed the dramatic consequences of the collapse of Youngstown's steel industry in the late 1970s and early 1980s. The city's population declined from 140,000 in 1970 to 95,000 in 1990 (it was about 67,000 in 2010) and crime increased precipitously. Despite becoming a mother as a teenager, Thomas was the first member of her family to graduate from high school. Determined not to become dependent on welfare, in 1988 she got a union job at a Packard Electric plant that made automotive parts for General Motors. The job enabled Thomas to become a homeowner and send her three children to college. In 2006 Packard Electric's successor company, Delphi Automotive, announced that it would close most of its American plants, including those in Youngstown, as it shifted production to Mexican maquiladoras. Thomas took a buyout offer from Delphi. Thomas found a new job as a community organizer in Youngstown, recruiting local residents to advocate for neighborhood improvement and mapping the city's many abandoned properties.

=== Shorter biographical sketches ===
In addition to the longer portraits of ordinary Americans, The Unwinding also includes shorter biographical sketches of the following influential figures:

- Newt Gingrich
- Oprah Winfrey
- Raymond Carver
- Sam Walton
- Colin Powell
- Alice Waters
- Robert Rubin
- Jay-Z
- Andrew Breitbart
- Peter Thiel
- Elizabeth Warren

== Reception ==
Writing in The New York Times Book Review, columnist David Brooks praised the book's narratives as "beautifully reported" and "vivid snapshots of people who have experienced a loss of faith", but criticized Packer's lack of analysis. According to Brooks, the book's "lack of a foundational theory of history undermines the explanatory power of The Unwinding".

== Bibliography ==
- Packer, George (2013). The Unwinding: An Inner History of the New America (first ed.). New York: Farrar, Straus and Giroux. ISBN 978-0374102418.
