= Ann Packer (author) =

American novelist and short story writer (born 1959)

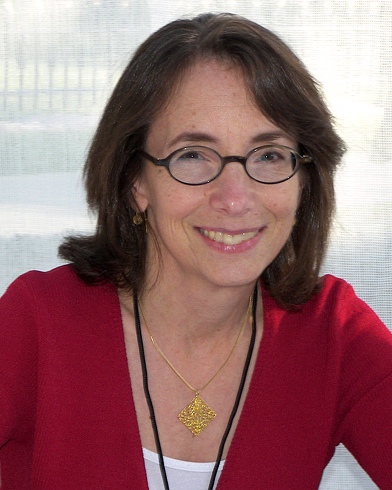
- Ann Packer at the 2008 Texas Book Festival
- Born: 1959 (age 66–67); Stanford, California, U.S.
- Occupations: Novelist, short story writer
- Website: www.annpacker.com

Ann Packer (born 1959) is an American novelist and short story writer. She is the recipient of a James Michener Award and a National Endowment for the Arts fellowship.

== Personal life ==
Packer was born in Stanford, California. She is the daughter of Stanford University professors Herbert L. Packer and Nancy Huddleston Packer.

Her mother was a student of the historian/novelist Wallace Stegner at the Stanford Writing Program; Nancy Packer later joined the Stanford faculty as professor of English and creative writing. Her father was on the faculty of Stanford Law School, where he highlighted the tensions between Due Process and Crime Control. In 1969, when Ann was 10 years old, he suffered a stroke that paralyzed the right side of his body. He died by suicide three years later.

Her uncle, George Huddleston, Jr., and her grandfather, George Huddleston, Sr., were congressmen from Alabama. Her brother, George Packer, is a novelist, journalist, and playwright. Her father was Jewish and her mother was from a Christian background.

== Career ==
Packer was an English major at Yale University, but only began writing fiction during her senior year. She moved to New York after college and took a job writing paperback cover copy at Ballantine Books. She attended the Iowa Writers' Workshop from 1986 to 1988, selling her first short story to The New Yorker a few weeks before receiving her M.F.A. degree.

In 1988 Packer moved to Madison, Wisconsin as a fellow at the Wisconsin Institute for Creative Writing. During her two years in Wisconsin she published stories in literary magazines, including the story "Babies", which was included in the 1992 O. Henry Award prize stories collection. The New Yorker story, "Mendocino", became the title story of her first book, Mendocino and Other Stories, published by Chronicle Books in 1994.

Packer spent almost 10 years writing The Dive From Clausen's Pier. Geri Thoma of the Elaine Markson Agency agreed to take on the book and sold it almost immediately to the editor Jordan Pavlin at Alfred A. Knopf. It was the first selection of the Good Morning America “Read This!” book club and received a Great Lakes Book Award, an American Library Association Award, and the Kate Chopin Literary Award. Packer’s next two books were also published by Knopf: a novel, Songs Without Words (2007), and a collection of short fiction, Swim Back to Me (2011). "Things Said or Done," one of the stories in Swim Back to Me, was included in the 2012 O. Henry Award prize stories collection. The Children's Crusade was published by Scribner in 2015 and was named one of the ten best books of 2015 by People Magazine.

In addition to fiction, Packer has written essays for The Washington Post'', Vogue, Real Simple and O, The Oprah Magazine.

The Dive from Clausen's Pier was adapted into a cable television film.

== Books ==
- Mendocino and other Stories (1994) Chronicle Books; (2003) Vintage Books
- The Dive From Clausen's Pier (2002) Alfred A. Knopf
- Songs Without Words (2007) Alfred A. Knopf
- Swim Back to Me (2011) Alfred A. Knopf
- The Children's Crusade (2015) Scribner
- Some Bright Nowhere (2025)

== Essays ==
This list is taken from Ann Packer's official website.

- "Between Books," published in the Author's Note of The New York Times Book Review May 29, 2016
- "5 Writing Tips," published in Publishers Weekly, April 10, 2015
- "Thanks For The Ride," Published in the Life Lessons feature of Real Simple, June 2011
- "Bag Lady" published in Plenty, December, January 2008.
- “My Life in Food,” published in Death by Pad Thai and Other Unforgettable Meals, Douglas Bauer, editor. This essay was also published, in an abridged form, in the Life Lessons feature of Real Simple, November, 2006.
- “Out in the World,” published in the Writing Life feature of The Washington Post, October 31, 2004.
- “The Preppy Look,” published in the Nostalgia feature of Vogue, November, 2004.
