= Herbert L. Packer =

American criminologist

Herbert Leslie Packer (1925 – December 6, 1972) was an American law professor and criminologist. His key work is the book The Limits of the Criminal Sanction (1968), which proposed two models of the criminal justice system, the crime control model and the due process model. These models were extremely influential in criminology and criminal policy debates and are still included in undergraduate textbooks on criminology.

== Life and career ==
Packer was born in Jersey City, New Jersey. He earned a B.A. in government and international relations in 1944 from Yale University and was admitted to Phi Beta Kappa. He earned an LL.B. in 1949 from Yale Law School and was article editor of the Yale Law Journal.

Packer was a law clerk for Judge Thomas Walter Swan from 1949 to 1950. After working for the law firm of Cox, Langford, Stoddard & Cutler, he became a law professor at Stanford in 1956. He married Nancy Huddleston Packer, author and daughter of U.S. Representative George Huddleston, in 1958. They are the parents of authors Ann Packer and George Packer. He was Vice Provost for Academic Planning and Programs at Stanford from 1967 to 1969. He suffered a serious stroke in 1969 but returned to Stanford later that year. He became the Jackson Eli Reynolds Professor of Law in 1971.

In 1969, Packer suffered a stroke that partially paralyzed him. Three years later, he committed suicide at the age of 46 in San Francisco. He did not finish a planned biography of Learned Hand.

His first book, Ex-Communist Witnesses: Four Studies in Fact Finding (1962), discussed the testimony of four individuals involved in legal investigations into Communism in the United States: Whittaker Chambers, Elizabeth Bentley, Louis Budenz, and John Lautner. The Limits of the Criminal Sanction was awarded the Coif Book Award in 1970 by the Order of the Coif, an honor society for law school graduates.

In an article in The Nation called "A Measure of Achievement" (1964), Packer concluded that the Warren Commission did a "conscientious and at times brilliant job" compiling the Warren Report and concurred that it proved "beyond a reasonable doubt" that U.S. President John F. Kennedy was assassinated by Lee Harvey Oswald.
