= Jim Manley (strategist) =

American Democratic Party political strategist

Jim Manley is an American political strategist known for working for various Democratic Party politicians. He worked at Quinn Gillespie & Associates from 2011 - 2017 as a senior director in their Communications and Government Affairs groups. After the firm dissolved, he has been on his own, advising clients quietly on a wide variety of issues.

== Career in Washington ==
Manley has worked on Capitol Hill for over two decades, including as a top leadership aide and communications director for former Nevada Senator Harry Reid when Reid was the Senate Majority Leader. Previously, he worked as an aide to Massachusetts Senator Ted Kennedy for eleven years, starting in 1993. Before that, he worked for Maine Senator George J. Mitchell.
