= John David Hoppe =

American politician and lobbyist

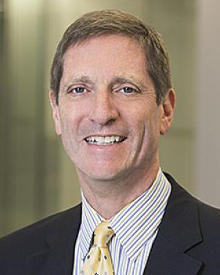

Chief of Staff to the Speaker of the United States House of Representatives
- In office October 29, 2015 – January 3, 2019
- Leader: Paul Ryan
- Preceded by: Mike Sommers
- Succeeded by: TBA

Personal details
- Born: August 25, 1951 (age 75)
- Party: Republican
- Spouse: Karen Davis
- Children: Katherine Hoppe; Geoffrey Hoppe; Gregory Hoppe
- Parent(s): John Andrew Hoppe († 2001); Mary Carol Field Hoppe († 2009)
- Education: University of Notre Dame (BA); Johns Hopkins University (MA)
- Profession: Politician; Lobbyist
- Website: Hoppe Strategies; David Hoppe on Twitter

John David Hoppe (born August 25, 1951) is an American politician and lobbyist who served as Chief of Staff for U.S. Speaker of the House Paul Ryan.

== Education ==
Hoppe earned a B.A. in Government from the University of Notre Dame and a M.A. in International Relations from the School of Advanced International Studies at Johns Hopkins University.

== Career ==
=== Reagan Administration ===
Hoppe was involved in crafting several of Ronald Reagan's tax cuts, including the Economic Recovery Tax Act of 1981, which was the biggest tax cut of the 1968–2006 period, the Omnibus Budget Reconciliation Act of 1981, and the Tax Reform Act of 1986, which is noted for reducing the top individual tax rate to 28% and lowered corporation income taxes to 34%, and is cited for having increased income inequality between 1984–1989, where the top one percent of income earners received 8.4% of national income, while in 1989, it increased to 13.5%.

=== Quinn Gillespie & Associates ===
From June 2003–October 2011, Hoppe worked for the lobbying powerhouse group, Quinn Gillespie & Associates, having ended serving as President.

=== Chief of Staff to the Senate Republican Whip ===
From October 2011–January 2013, Hoppe served as the Chief of Staff to the Senate Republican Whip, Jon Kyl.

=== Bipartisan Policy Center ===
Since April 2013, Hoppe has served as the Senior Advisor to Bipartisan Policy Center.

=== Hoppe Strategies ===
Registered on April 25, 2013, and operating since July 2013, Hoppe has owned his own firm, Hoppe Strategies, based out of Virginia, in which he serves as President. His firm has lobbied on behalf of Ford Motor Company since it began in 2013, and has lobbied on behalf of Delta Air Lines and MarkLogic Corporation since 2015.

== Lobbying ==
Hoppe has a history of government lobbying, which has called into question whether the choice of a lobbyist as Paul Ryan's Chief of Staff is another move toward the K Street Project, and has resulted in a petition against hiring corporate lobbyists into office.

Hoppe represented Sheldon Adelson, a billionaire casino business magnate, on behalf of the Coalition to Stop Internet Gambling. The coalition was launched by Sheldon Adelson after his own company failed in its online gambling endeavor, causing Adelson to claim that his "moral standard compels" him to take a stand against internet gambling.
