= The Assassins' Gate: America in Iraq =

2005 non-fiction book by George Packer

- Author: George Packer
- Language: English
- Genre: Non-fiction
- Publisher: Farrar, Straus & Giroux
- Publication date: 2005
- Publication place: United States
- Media type: Hardback

The Assassins' Gate: America in Iraq is a non-fiction book detailing the 2003 U.S. invasion of Iraq and its aftermath by American journalist George Packer, otherwise best known for his writings in The New Yorker. He published the work through Farrar, Straus & Giroux in 2005. Packer argued that the whole project became a bungled mess with American officials in the George W. Bush administration cherry-picking intelligence to support their positions, as well as being unable to respond to military issues such as insufficient troops, armor, and supplies.

Favorable reviews appeared in a variety of publications such as the New York Times and the San Francisco Chronicle, and the Overseas Press Club recommended it. The book was also a finalist for the 2006 Pulitzer Prize and won the New York Public Library's Helen Bernstein Book Award for Excellence in Journalism.

== Background and contents ==
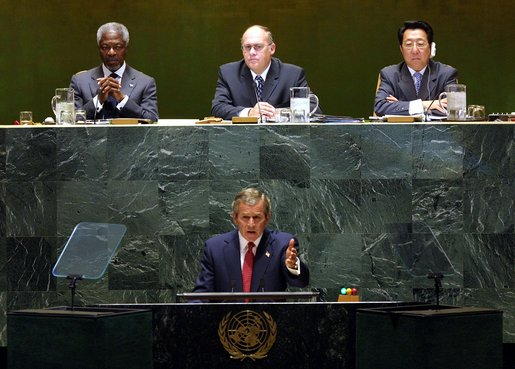
George W. Bush addressing the General Assembly of the United Nations in September 2002 to outline the complaints of the U.S. government against the Iraqi government

Packer describes his own socio-political views as being that of an "ambivalently pro-war liberal". He states that he "wanted to see a homicidal dictator removed from power before he committed mass murder again", having also agreed with the overall cause of promoting democracy and free societies worldwide articulated by George W. Bush and his supporters. He later told NPR that he feared the "administration would not be able to do this" and also worried "about the regional reaction... the inevitable consequences of war."

The book describes rationales for the invasion of Iraq in the context of the war on terror, detailing that Saddam Hussein's supposed ties to al-Qaeda and other issues played far less of a role than usually understood. Instead, Packer reports that a small clique of policy people in key administration positions, primarily Defense Secretary Donald Rumsfeld and his deputy Paul Wolfowitz, sought to fundamentally alter the future of the Middle East. They reportedly planned a grand realignment in favor of the West and its ideas using a democratic national outpost in the region.

Packer writes that planning in various agencies such as U.S. State Department and the National Security Council proved both very right, in terms of the actual military invasion against Hussein's forces that proceeded rapidly with few casualties, and very wrong, in terms of the following occupation and post-war reconstruction. According to the book, figures from Rumsfeld to Vice President Dick Cheney and others refused to consider U.S. involvement in what they viewed as unnecessary "nation-building" for ideological reasons, expecting to only have 30,000 Americans in Iraq by September 2003. Packer describes their ideology as frankly delusional due to the challenges faced. Packer argues, "Where it mattered and could have made a difference, the advice of experts was unwelcome."

Richard N. Haass, a former director of policy planning at the U.S. State Department, is quoted in the book as saying that he will go to his grave not knowing why the administration chose to invade Iraq. Muddled thinking, according to Packer, in the high offices of the U.S. government as to their mission and goals led to a tone deaf response to responsible, pointed criticism by lower-level people about Iraqi border security issues, problems in Iraqi police and army expansion, corruption in funding of Iraqi government programs, and other such areas. Packer views the whole enterprise of re-building Iraq as suffering from "criminal negligence".

Besides telling about the American leaders, the book also contains many accounts of individual Iraqis caught in the war. The stories of nationalistic dreamers, housewives, sectarians, businessmen, exiles, military men, educators, former prisoners, and countless others are recorded. Equal attention is given to Kurds, Sunnis, and Shiites and to urban and rural residents. Also, the account of one American, the father of a soldier killed in the war, delves into the consequences of war for those Americans without a voice in national politics.

The author concludes having panned the overall job of the administration. "Swaddled in abstract ideas," he writes, "convinced of their own righteousness, incapable of self-criticism, indifferent to accountability, they turned a difficult undertaking into a needlessly deadly one" so that when "things went wrong, they found other people to blame." He also argues, "The Iraq War was always winnable; it still is. For this very reason, the recklessness of its authors is all the harder to forgive."

== Reviews and response ==
The New York Times published praise from literary critic Michiko Kakutani, who lauded the book's "wide-angled, overarching take on the Iraq war". She referred to what she saw as "Mr. Packer's lucid ability to pull together information from earlier books and integrate it with his own reporting from Washington and Iraq." She also called the work an "authoritative and tough-minded new book".

Fareed Zakaria wrote for The New York Times Book Review that "Packer provides page after page of vivid description of the haphazard, poorly planned and almost criminally executed occupation of Iraq." Zakaria also remarked, "In reading him we see the staggering gap between abstract ideas and concrete reality." Praise also appeared in the San Francisco Chronicle. Reviewer Yonatan Lupu called it a "book that is not only relevant but discerning and provocative", and he lauded it for having "vivid detail and balanced analysis".

The book won the New York Public Library’s Helen Bernstein Book Award.

== See also ==
=== See also ===
- Foreign policy of the George W. Bush administration
- Invasion of Iraq
- Iraqi civil war

=== Related books ===
- Imperial Hubris
- Plan of Attack
- State of Denial: Bush at War, Part III
