= The Dive from Clausen's Pier (film) =

2005 Lifetime original film based on the Ann Packer novel

- Based on: The Dive from Clausen's Pier by Ann Packer
- Screenplay by: John Wierick
- Directed by: Harry Winer
- Starring: Michelle Trachtenberg; Will Estes; Sean Maher
- Country of origin: United States
- Original language: English

Production
- Running time: 96 minutes
- Production company: Miramax

Original release
- Network: Lifetime
- Release: July 25, 2005

The Dive from Clausen's Pier is a 2005 Lifetime original film based on an Ann Packer novel directed by Harry Winer and starring Will Estes, Michelle Trachtenberg, and Sean Maher. It premiered on July 25, 2005, on Lifetime.

Mike is a quadriplegic after suffering a major diving accident. His fiancée, Carrie, is not in love with him anymore and is confused and lost after the accident. As a result, she decides to move to Manhattan and away from her small-town life. Along the way she meets a handsome, older man who has problems of his own. Carrie tries to figure out where her place in the world is in a journey of self-discovery.

Many of the characters in the film are in their late teens or early twenties, while in the source novel they are much older. The film also ends on a slightly more optimistic tone than the novel.

The film received a nomination for Outstanding Music Composition for a Miniseries, Movie or a Special (Original Dramatic Score) at the 58th Primetime Emmy Awards in 2006.

== Cast ==
- Michelle Trachtenberg as Carrie Beal
- Matthew Edison as Simon
- Will Estes as Mike Mayer
- Kristin Fairlie as Jamie
- Sean Maher as Kilroy
- Dylan Taylor as Rooster
- Nathan Weldon as Skateboard Kid Extra
- Susan Counsel as Christine

== Filming location ==
- Halifax, Nova Scotia, Canada
