= Brown–Kaufman amendment =

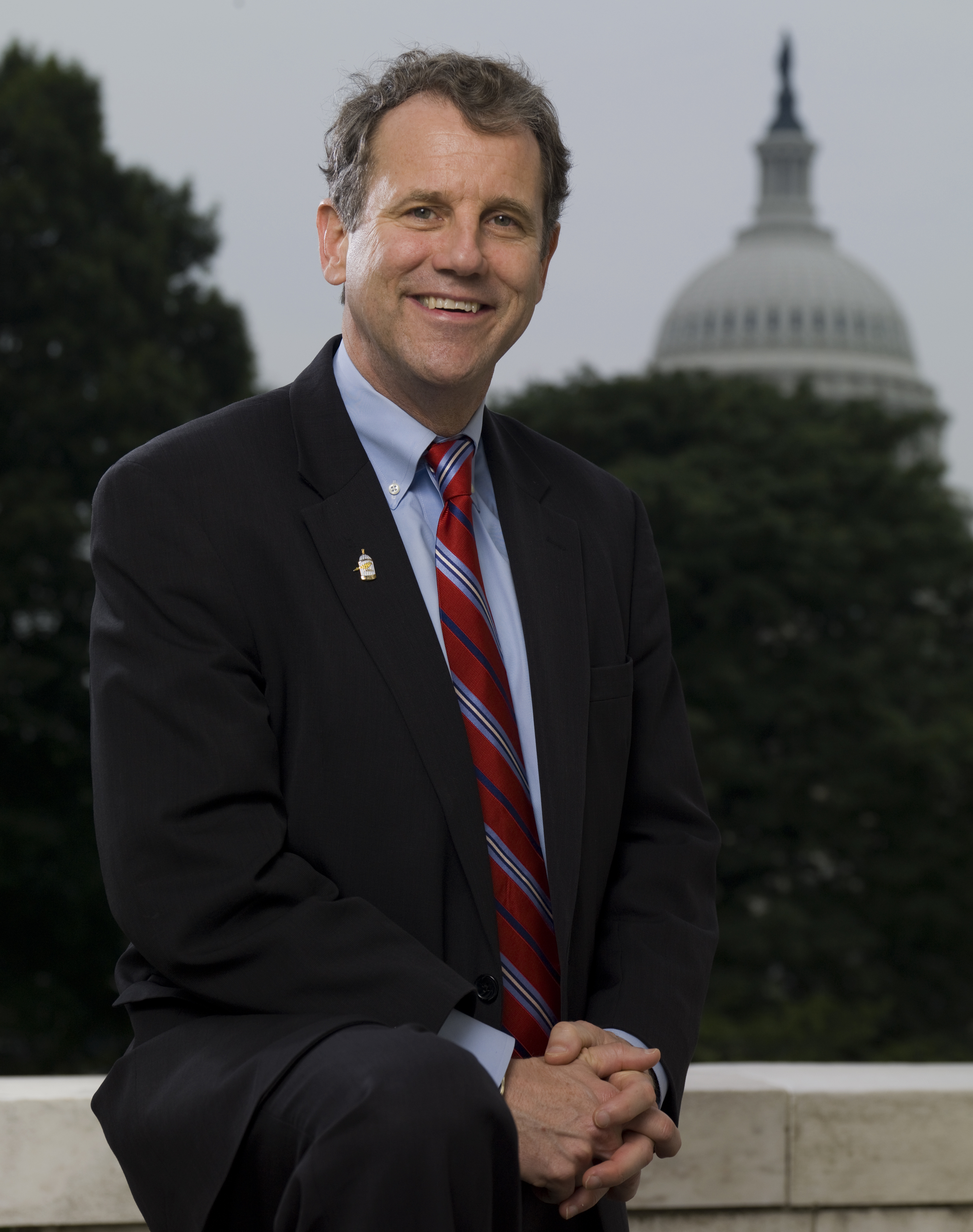
Brown

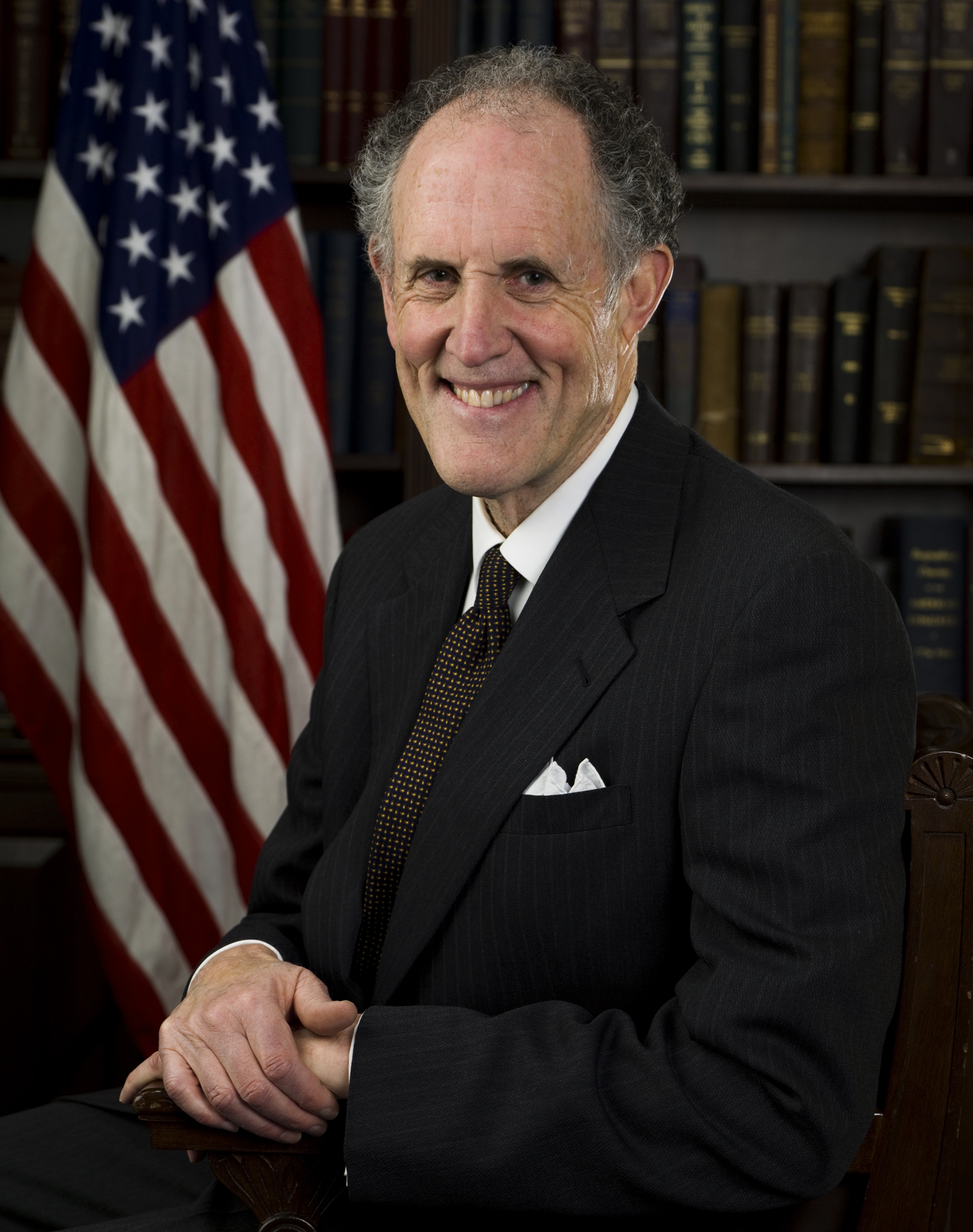
Kaufman

The Brown–Kaufman amendment (or the SAFE Banking Act) was a failed 2010 amendment proposed in the United States Senate to be part of the Dodd–Frank bill by Democratic Senators Sherrod Brown (OH) and Ted Kaufman (DE). It sought to address the moral hazard of too big to fail by breaking up the largest banks with limits on the size of financial institutions. The Christian Science Monitor said the amendment was based on the idea that "too big to fail is too big to exist." The New York Times called it a liberal initiative with pure "populist appeal".

The proposal failed on the Senate floor by a vote of 33 to 61 on May 6, 2010. Economist Simon Johnson emphasized that only a handful of Republicans voted for the bill and that the Obama administration opposed the amendment. After the vote, The American Prospect said the 33 "Yea" votes represented a "fascinating coalition – liberals and conservatives, Democratic leadership and three Republican conservatives." The New York Times said the amendment was strongly opposed by Wall Street; supporters included The New York Times' editorial page, the editorial board of The Christian Science Monitor, and Simon Johnson.

To The Christian Science Monitor, former Federal Reserve chairman Alan Greenspan hinted at support for the idea behind the amendment with his statement that "If they’re too big to fail, they're too big." Related legislation was passed in the Bank Holding Act of 1970, which gave regulatory powers to the Federal Reserve to cap bank sizes, but it was weakly enforced. A previous (1994) law limited a bank's total deposits to less than 10% of the nation's total, but waivers were issued to JPMorgan Chase, Wells Fargo, and Bank of America.

The amendment would have capped deposits and other liabilities and restricted bank assets to 10% of US GDP. At the time of the Senate vote, three banks, JPMorgan Chase, Wells Fargo, and Bank of America, exceeded that proposed amount. Any one bank's non-deposit liabilities would have been capped at 2% of GDP and for non-bank financial firms, the amount would have been 3%.

== See also ==
- Volcker Rule
