= Quinn Gillespie & Associates =

American lobbying and communications firm

- Industry: Lobbying and Communications
- Founded: 2000; 26 years ago
- Founder: Ed Gillespie; Jack Quinn
- Defunct: December 2017
- Fate: Acquired by WPP
- Key people: Jack Quinn, Co-founder and Chairman; John David "Dave" Hoppe, President

Quinn Gillespie & Associates (QGA, later QGA Public Affairs) was an American lobbying and communications firm founded in January 2000 by Republican political strategist Ed Gillespie and Democratic operative Jack Quinn. Within two years it ranked among the ten largest lobbying firms in Washington. WPP acquired the firm in December 2003, and it ceased operations in 2017.

== History ==
=== Founding and early growth ===
Quinn and Gillespie opened the firm in January 2000 with nine employees. Quinn had served as White House Counsel and as chief of staff to Vice President Al Gore before returning to the law firm Arnold & Porter; Gillespie had been communications director of the Republican National Committee and a senior adviser to the Bush-Cheney campaign. The pairing of a Democratic and a Republican principal was marketed as a single point of access to both parties.

Staffing reached roughly thirty by late 2001, and lobbying fee income for the first half of that year came to nearly $5.1 million, an increase of 42 percent over the same months of 2000. The firm entered the top ten of National Journal's midyear ranking of Washington lobbying shops for the first time, placing tenth, with an average billing per client of about $162,000 — the highest average among the ten. Roll Call placed the firm twelfth in its 2002 survey, by which point clients were paying an average of roughly $255,000 a year. According to an analysis of federal disclosure filings by the consumer group Public Citizen, the firm took in $27.4 million in lobbying fees between its founding and the end of 2002.

Gillespie told an interviewer in late 2001 that expansion had outpaced the partners' own projections and that a growth rate of around ten percent would be a more realistic target for the following year.

=== Marc Rich pardon ===
In January 2001, weeks after the firm's first anniversary, Quinn became the subject of national attention over his role in securing a presidential pardon for Marc Rich, a commodities trader who had fled the United States in 1983 rather than face charges of tax evasion. Quinn had joined Rich's legal team in 1999 and was widely credited with persuading Bill Clinton to include him among the pardons issued on the president's final day in office. Quinn gave extensive testimony to congressional committees examining the matter.

Quinn maintained that Rich had never been a client of Quinn Gillespie, but rather a holdover from his years at Arnold & Porter, and that he had represented him in a judicial rather than a lobbying capacity. A federal judge who reviewed the pardons concluded that Rich's lawyers had functioned principally as lobbyists, observing that Quinn's value to the client lay in his access to the president rather than in his legal draftsmanship.

Contemporary reporting found that the episode did not cost the firm business. Clients stayed, new ones signed during the months the controversy was at its height, and colleagues in the lobbying trade were divided – some faulting Quinn's judgment in approaching a former client in the White House, others defending the representation as ordinary advocacy. Gillespie said the affair had at no point threatened the partnership.

=== Acquisition by WPP ===
The British communications group WPP announced on 9 December 2003 that it had bought the business and assets of the firm. At the time of the sale the firm had 25 employees, revenues of $12.5 million for the year ending 31 December 2002, and net assets of $2.5 million. The founders retained their roles, but no longer owned the name; Quinn later remarked that it had been sold along with the business.

In 2005 the firm joined with its WPP sister company Burson-Marsteller to form 360Advantage, a joint venture combining advocacy work with political advertising.

=== Peak and decline ===
Revenue reached its height in 2006 and 2007 at approximately $18 million a year, according to disclosure filings compiled by the Center for Responsive Politics. By 2007 the same figures placed the firm ninth among the highest-earning lobbying operations in Washington. A broadcast report that year put cumulative earnings since the founding at more than $85 million. In Washingtonian's 2007 survey of the city's fifty leading lobbyists, Quinn placed fourth and Gillespie eighth.

Gillespie left in 2007 to become counselor to President George W. Bush, ending seven years with the firm. Dave Hoppe, who had joined in 2003, served as president from 2007 to 2011 before returning briefly to the Senate. Around 2012 two further senior lobbyists, Marc Lampkin and Manuel Ortiz, departed to lead the Washington office of Brownstein Hyatt Farber Schreck. The firm was later renamed QGA Public Affairs.

=== Closure ===
In 2016 Quinn was listed as a lobbyist on roughly $2.4 million of the firm's work across ten clients, among them Sony Corporation of America, State Farm and U.S. Steel. He announced early the following year that he would move to Burson-Marsteller, another WPP company, and said afterwards that he had intended to leave for some time but had been bound by a year's notice and a non-compete agreement with the parent group.

Restructuring was made public at the end of March 2017. Patrick Przybyski, Burson-Marsteller's chief operating officer, took over as acting chairman and described the changes as a reorganisation intended to serve existing clients. Republicans John Feehery, John Easton and Adam Belmar left to found EFB Advocacy, a smaller lobbying and communications practice; Jim Manley also departed. A reduced staff was expected to remain to wind down operations. Clients registered shortly before the restructuring included AT&T, 21st Century Fox, the National Association of Broadcasters, Sony and U.S. Steel. By June 2017, the business had effectively closed, and Quinn joined Manatt, Phelps & Phillips as a partner.

== Clients and lobbying ==
WPP described the firm at the time of its acquisition as having attracted clients including Hewlett-Packard, Sony, Coca-Cola, PricewaterhouseCoopers, Verizon, DirecTV, Tyson Foods and Microsoft. Later accounts listed Verizon, Bank of America, Cisco Systems, Hewlett-Packard, DaimlerChrysler and Enron among the firm's major representations.

By the measure of fees collected between 2000 and 2002, the largest accounts were the British Columbia Lumber Trade Council and the electronic trading network Instinet, each at roughly $1.78 million, followed by PricewaterhouseCoopers at $1.35 million and DirecTV and SBC Communications at $1.24 million apiece. Documented campaigns from this period include opposition to higher fuel economy standards on behalf of DaimlerChrysler, wireless spectrum work for Verizon Wireless and DirecTV, securities regulation for PricewaterhouseCoopers and Instinet, and support for tariffs sought by the Stand Up for Steel coalition. An effort to remove United States duties on Canadian softwood lumber for the British Columbia council was unsuccessful.

The firm was among several retained by Enron before the company's collapse. Public Citizen's analysis of disclosure filings put the account at $700,000 in 2001, billed at $75,000 a month, for work on the California electricity crisis and against proposals to reimpose price controls on western wholesale power markets.

Between 2005 and 2007, the firm earned about $740,000 lobbying on student lending for Nelnet, Bank of America and College Loan Corp. as Congress reconsidered subsidies paid to private lenders under the federally guaranteed loan programme. The legislation the clients opposed, which redirected those subsidies toward grants and lower interest rates, was enacted. Responding to criticism of this work during Gillespie's 2017 campaign for governor of Virginia, a campaign spokesman said Gillespie had not taken part in the student lending account and that the firm had registered him for most of its clients as a precaution, since lobbying without registration is an offence while registering without lobbying is not.

The firm also represented Tenet Healthcare from 2006, registering on Medicare payment matters and receiving at least $480,000 over a period when the company was contesting federal allegations of improper billing.

== Staff ==
Management

- Jack Quinn, co-founder and chairman, former counsel to President Bill Clinton and former chief of staff to Vice President Al Gore
- Ed Gillespie, former RNC Chairman, White House Communications Director and candidate for senator and governor in Virginia.
- John David "Dave" Hoppe, president, former chief of staff to then-Senate Majority Leader, U.S. Senator Trent Lott (R-MS)
- John Feehery, former spokesman for Speaker of the House Dennis Hastert, Rep. Tom Delay and Rep. Bob Michel, and former SVP of communications and public policy at the MPAA
- Jim Manley, senior director, Communications and Government Affairs

Democrats

- Michael Hussey, Served as chief of staff and chief federal lobbyist for the American Resort Development Association
- Bonnie Hogue Duffy, former legislative assistant to Senator Jack Reed (D-RI) and Senior Health Policy Advisor to the Senate Democratic Policy Committee
- Ambassador Ralph R. Johnson (ret.)
- Kevin Kayes, former chief counsel to Senate Majority Leader Harry Reid (D-NV)
- Nick Maduros, worked as an attorney in Arnold & Porter's Public Policy Practice Group
- Manuel Ortiz, national finance vice chairman and co-chair of the Hispanic Steering Committee for Senator John Kerry's presidential campaign
- Rick Shapiro, Formerly executive vice president of public affairs for CEMEX's U.S. operations
- Stephanie Sutton, Served as New York finance director for then-Congresswoman Kirsten Gillibrand (NY-20)
- Patrick Von Bargen, former chief of staff to Senator Jeff Bingaman (D-NM) and managing executive for policy and staff for Chairman William H. Donaldson (R-NY) at the Securities & Exchange Commission

Republicans

- Drew Cole
- Elizabeth Hogan, previously worked for the Bush administration and the Republican National Committee
- Marc Lampkin, previously served in a variety of roles with the Bush for President campaign and was formerly the general counsel to then-House Republican Conference chairman John Boehner (later House Majority Leader)
- David R. Lugar, former director of congressional affairs for the U.S. Chamber of Commerce
- Harriet James Melvin, Previously served as vice president for federal government affairs for Circuit City Stores and CarMax

Communications

- Susan Garman Kranias, former managing director and member of the public affairs leadership team at Burson-Marsteller
- Virginia Hume, former managing director at BMSG Worldwide
- Pat McMurray, worked as a writer-producer on a political talk show at MSNBC, a news editor and writer at The NewsHour with Jim Lehrer, and a news writer at CNN's Washington bureau
- Matthew Dornic, Vice President at CNN
- Christopher Brown, former journalist and producer of FOX's America's Most Wanted
- Ashley Prime, previously worked for the Republican National Committee
