= George Packer =

American journalist and writer (born 1960)

- Packer at the 2026 Texas Book Festival
- Born: 1960 (age 65–66); Santa Clara, California, U.S.
- Education: Yale University (BA)
- Occupations: Journalist; novelist; playwright
- Spouse(s): Michele Millon; Laura Secor (present)
- Writing career
- Notable work: The Assassins' Gate: America in Iraq
- Notable awards: National Book Award for Nonfiction in November 2013 for The Unwinding

George Packer (born August 13, 1960) is an American journalist, novelist, and playwright.

He is best known for his writings about U.S. foreign policy for The New Yorker and The Atlantic and for his book The Assassins' Gate: America in Iraq.

Packer also wrote The Unwinding: An Inner History of the New America, covering the history of the US from 1978 to 2012. In November 2013, The Unwinding received the National Book Award for Nonfiction.

His award-winning biography, Our Man: Richard Holbrooke and the End of the American Century, was released in May 2019. His latest book, The Emergency, was released in November 2025.

== Early life and education ==
Packer was born in California around 1960. His parents taught at Stanford University: his mother, Nancy Packer (née Huddleston), was a Wallace Stegner Fellow in the Creative Writing Program and later professor of English, and his father, Herbert L. Packer, was a distinguished professor of law, and the author of numerous books and articles. Packer's maternal grandfather, George Huddleston, Sr., served eleven successive terms (1915–1937) representing Alabama's ninth congressional district in the U.S. House of Representatives. His uncle, George Huddleston, Jr., was later elected to Congress in the same district, serving from 1954 to 1964. Packer's sister, Ann Packer, is also a writer. Their father's background was Jewish and their mother's Christian. In a 2022 talk for House of SpeakEasy's Seriously Entertaining program, Packer shared that his father took his own life when Packer was twelve years old, calling it "the big event of my childhood."

Packer graduated from Yale University in 1982, where he resided at Calhoun College (now called Grace Hopper College). He served in the Peace Corps in Togo.

Packer is married to writer and editor Laura Secor. He was previously married to Michele Millon.

== Career ==
His essays and articles have appeared in Boston Review, The Nation, World Affairs, Harper's, The New York Times, and The New Yorker, among other publications. Packer was a columnist for Mother Jones and was a staff writer for The New Yorker from 2003 to 2018. He now writes for The Atlantic.

Packer was a Holtzbrinck Fellow Class of Fall 2009 at the American Academy in Berlin.

His 2005 book The Assassins' Gate: America in Iraq analyzes the events that led to the 2003 invasion of Iraq and reports on subsequent developments in that country, largely based on interviews with ordinary Iraqis. He was a supporter of the Iraq war. He was a finalist for the 2004 Michael Kelly Award.

Packer wrote the play Betrayed, which premiered Off-Broadway in February 2008 at the Culture Project in New York City.

In July 2013 the New Yorker Festival released a video entitled Geoffrey Canada on Giving Voice to the Have-nots, of a panel that was moderated by George Packer. Along with Canada, the panelists included Abhijit Banerjee, Katherine Boo, and Jose Antonio Vargas.

The Unwinding: An Inner History of the New America focuses on the ways that America changed in the years between 1978 and 2012. The book achieves this mainly by tracing the lives of various individuals from different backgrounds through the years. Interspersed are capsule biographies of influential figures of the time such as Colin Powell, Newt Gingrich, Elizabeth Warren, Jay-Z, and Raymond Carver.

In 2019, Packer released Our Man: Richard Holbrooke and the End of the American Century, a biography of Richard Holbrooke, one of the most influential U.S. diplomats of the late twentieth century. Our Man was a finalist for the 2020 Pulitzer Prize in Biography.

His 2021 book Last Best Hope: America in Crisis and Renewal describes the fragmentation of American society in recent decades into four mutually antagonistic "four Americas": "Free America" (economically liberal), "Smart America" (educated, affluent and socially liberal), "Real America" (white rural precariat) and "Just America" (urban, progressive and economically disadvantaged).

== Awards and honors ==
- 2001 – RFK Book Award for Blood of the Liberals
- 2005 – Cornelius Ryan Award for The Assassin's Gate
- 2006 – Pulitzer Prize finalist in General Nonfiction for The Assassins' Gate: America in Iraq
- 2006 – Helen Bernstein Book Award for Excellence in Journalism for The Assassins' Gate: America in Iraq
- 2008 – Lucille Lortel Award for Outstanding Play for Betrayed
- 2013 – National Book Award for Nonfiction for The Unwinding
- 2013 – National Book Critics Circle Award (Nonfiction) shortlist for The Unwinding
- 2017 – Whiting Creative Nonfiction Grant to complete Richard Holbrooke and the End of the American Century
- 2019 – Hitchens Prize for Our Man: Richard Holbrooke and the End of the American Century
- 2019 – Los Angeles Times Book Prize (biography) for Our Man: Richard Holbrooke and the End of the American Century
- 2020 – Pulitzer Prize finalist in Biography for Our Man: Richard Holbrooke and the End of the American Century
