= 1914 United States Senate election in Alabama =

- November 3, 1914
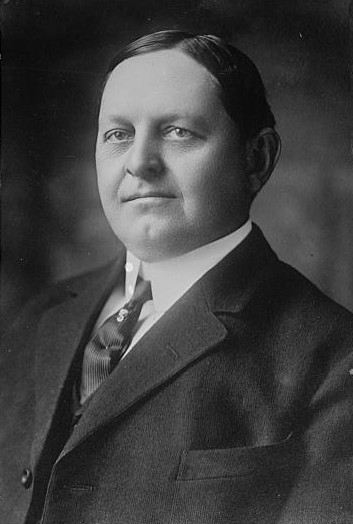

Nominee	Oscar Underwood	Alex C. Birch
Party	Democratic	Republican
Popular vote	63,389	12,320
Percentage	78.13%	15.18%
- County results Underwood: 40–50% 50–60% 60–70% 70–80% 80–90% >90% Birch: 40–50% 60–70% Longshore: 50–60%
U.S. senator before election
Frank White
Democratic
Elected U.S. Senator
Oscar Underwood
Democratic

The 1914 United States Senate election in Alabama was held on November 3, 1914. Incumbent U.S. Senator Frank White, who had been elected in a May 11, 1914, special election to fill the remaining months of Senator Joseph F. Johnston's term, did not run for re-election. U.S. Representative Oscar Underwood, the House Majority Leader, won the Democratic primary over fellow Representative Richmond P. Hobson. In the general election, he defeated Republican nominee Alex C. Birch in a landslide.

== Democratic primary ==
=== Candidates ===
- Oscar Underwood, U.S. Representative from Alabama's 9th congressional district, House Majority Leader
- Richmond P. Hobson, U.S. Representative from Alabama's 6th congressional district

=== Results ===
Democratic primary results
Party	Candidate	Votes	%
Democratic	Oscar Underwood	89,740	62.11%
Democratic	Richmond P. Hobson	54,738	37.89%
Total votes		144,478	100.00%

== General election ==
=== Results ===
1914 United States Senate election in Alabama
Party	Candidate	Votes	%	±%
Democratic	Oscar Underwood	63,389	78.13%	−21.87%
Republican	Alex C. Birch	12,320	15.18%	—
Progressive	Adolphus P. Longshore	4,263	5.25%	—
Socialist	S. F. Hinton	1,159	1.43%	—
Write-in		2	0.00%	—
Majority		51,069	62.94%	−37.06%
Total votes		81,133	100.00%	
Democratic hold				

== See also ==
- 1914 United States Senate elections

== Sources ==
Owen, Thomas M.; Alabama Department of Archives and History (1915). Alabama Official and Statistical Register 1915.
