= Birmingham Post-Herald =

Defunct daily newspaper in Birmingham, Alabama

- Type: Daily newspaper
- Owner: Scripps (1950–2005)
- Founder(s): Age: John Cantley; Herald: Rufus N. Rhodes; Post: Ed Leech
- Founded: 1850
- Ceased publication: September 23, 2005
- Language: English
- Headquarters: Birmingham, Alabama
- ISSN: 1040-1571
- OCLC number: 7208782

The Birmingham Post-Herald was a daily newspaper in Birmingham, Alabama, with roots dating back to 1850, before the founding of Birmingham. The final edition was published on September 23, 2005. In its last full year, its average daily circulation was 7,544, down from 8,948 the previous year.

== History ==
In 1850 John Cantley, a merchant from Tuscaloosa, established the Elyton Herald, Jefferson County's first newspaper. The early years of the newspaper were marked by frequent changes of name and ownership. In the 1860s, Cantley sold the weekly paper to Henry A. Hale. In 1871, the year that the new industrial center of Birmingham was incorporated, Hale sold the business to R. H. Henley, who was also Birmingham's first mayor. Henley renamed the paper the Birmingham Sun and published it himself for the first six months, before selling it to Thomas McLaughlin and James Matthews, who again changed the name to The Jefferson Independent. The Independent lasted for two years before it was bought by Willis Roberts and Frank M. Grace, who again changed the name, this time to The Weekly Iron Age.

In 1881, the paper again changed hands. The new owners, W. C. Garrett and R. H. Thornton, again changed the name to The Daily Birmingham Age and began daily publication for the first time. With the addition of national and world news items from the Associated Press the Age reached a peak of success, ranking second only to The Atlanta Constitution in the Southern market in advertising dollars.

In 1887 Rufus N. Rhodes founded a rival newspaper, The Daily Herald appeared on the streets of Birmingham. After a year as competitors, the two papers merged on November 8, 1888, to form The Birmingham Age-Herald. This combined paper was sold in 1896 to an upstart rival, The Daily State. For two years it was published under the Daily State Herald masthead before controlling interest was sold to E. W. Barrett and the Age-Herald name restored.

During this time, E. W. Barrett died and his widow sold the Age-Herald to Frederick I. Thompson, Donald Comer and B. B. Comer. In 1927 the paper was sold to another rival, Victor Henry Hanson, publisher of The Birmingham News. Hanson published both papers simultaneously, the Age-Herald in the morning and The Birmingham News in the evenings. On Sundays, a joint Birmingham News Age-Herald edition was distributed.

Another merger occurred in 1950 when the Age-Herald joined with the Scripps-Howard-owned Birmingham Post, which had grown to a large circulation since its founding in 1921 by Ed Leech. By the terms of the merger, the News and Post-Herald became independent papers published under a joint operating agreement. Circulation, advertising and printing were provided by The Birmingham News Company. The Post-Herald published on weekday mornings while the News became the sole evening and Sunday paper.

The Post-Herald figured in several episodes of the Civil Rights Movement. Post-Herald photographer Tommy Langston's 1961 image of Ku Klux Klan members attacking Freedom Riders attracted national attention because it showed FBI informant Gary Thomas Rowe in the violent mob. Langston himself was badly beaten after making the picture. In 1962, Post-Herald editor Jimmy Mills was arrested for publishing an election-day editorial suggesting how citizens should vote. Mills fought his conviction all the way to the U.S. Supreme Court, which held in Mills v. Alabama that the state could not prohibit campaigning on election day.

== Decline ==
In 1996, the News Company instigated a switch between the morning and evening publications, again creating a joint weekend edition (distributed on Saturdays). This move reinforced The News' pre-eminent role in a time when morning papers are the norm. Toward the end of its existence, the Post-Herald adopted a niche of emphasizing more detailed local stories and featuring well-known local columnists, including Paul Finebaum.

The long-expected closure was announced to staffers and then to the public by E. W. Scripps executives on the morning of September 22, 2005, the day before the final edition. The announcement said that the Birmingham market could simply no longer support two newspapers, thus continuing a trend of big-city afternoon newspapers either folding or merging with morning newspapers. Writer Clarke Stallworth held the distinction of writing the lead story for the front page of both the first and last editions of the Post-Herald.
