= 1914 United States Senate special election in Alabama =

- May 11, 1914
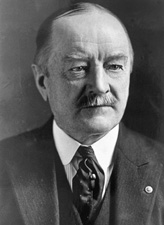
Nominee	Frank White
Party	Democratic
Popular vote	84,720
Percentage	99.93%
U.S. senator before election
Joseph F. Johnston
Democratic
Elected U.S. senator
Frank White
Democratic

The 1914 United States Senate special election in Alabama took place on May 11, 1914. U.S. Senator Joseph F. Johnston died on August 8, 1913, and a special election was held to fill the remainder of his term until the regular election on November 3, 1914. The Democratic primary took place on April 6, 1914, and Birmingham attorney Frank White won the Democratic primary in a landslide over Montgomery attorney Ray Ruston and State Senator Watt T. Brown. White was unopposed in the general election, and was elected as such. He did not run in the regular election.

== Democratic primary ==
=== Candidates ===
- Frank White, Birmingham attorney, former Mississippi State Representative
- Ray Rushton, Montgomery attorney
- Watt T. Brown, State Senator

=== Results ===
Democratic primary results
Party	Candidate	Votes	%
Democratic	Frank White	81,482	59.75%
Democratic	Ray Rushton	43,949	32.23%
Democratic	Watt T. Brown	10,931	8.02%
Total votes		136,362	100.00%

== General election ==
1914 United States Senate special election in Alabama
Party	Candidate	Votes	%
Democratic	Frank White	84,720	99.93%
Write-in		58	0.07%
Total votes		84,778	100.00%
Democratic hold			

== Sources ==
Owen, Thomas M.; Alabama Department of Archives and History (1915). Alabama Official and Statistical Register 1915.
