= Richmond P. Hobson =

American politician (1870–1937)

Richmond Hobson
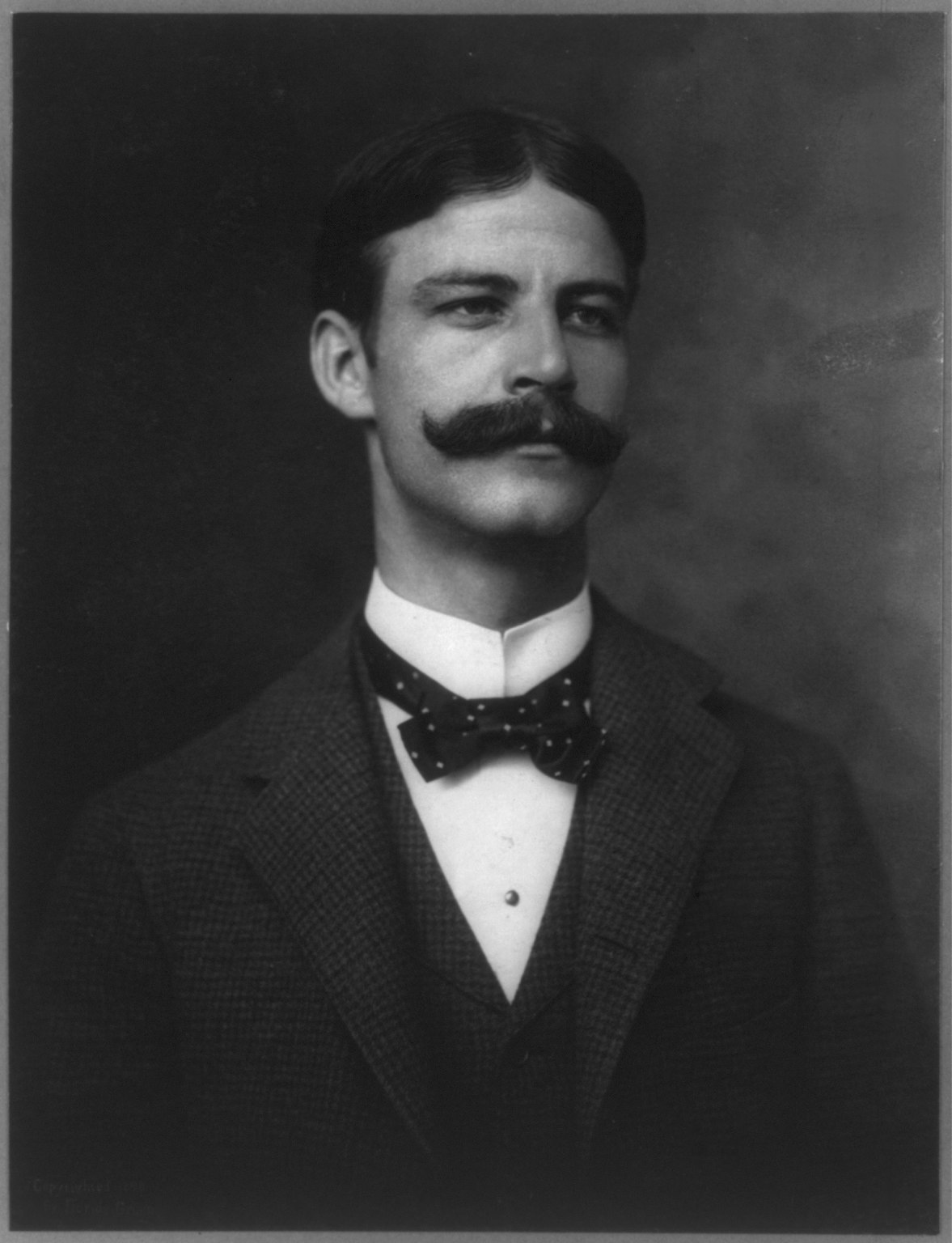

Member of the U.S. House of Representatives from Alabama's 6th district
- In office March 4, 1907 – March 3, 1915
- Preceded by: John H. Bankhead
- Succeeded by: William B. Oliver

Personal details
- Born: Richmond Pearson Hobson; August 17, 1870 Greensboro, Alabama U.S.
- Died: March 16, 1937 (aged 66) New York City, New York, U.S.
- Party: Democratic
- Education: United States Naval Academy (BS)

Military service
- Allegiance: United States
- Branch/service: United States Navy
- Years of service: 1889–1903
- Rank: Rear Admiral
- Battles/wars: Spanish–American War • Sinking of the Merrimac
- Awards: Medal of Honor

Richmond Pearson Hobson (August 17, 1870 – March 16, 1937) was a United States Navy rear admiral who served from 1907 to 1915 as a U.S. representative from Alabama. A veteran of the Spanish–American War, he received the Medal of Honor years later for his part in that conflict. He later became a leading proponent of Prohibition in the United States.

== Early life and career ==
He was born at Magnolia Grove in Greensboro in Hale County in the western Black Belt of Alabama. He was the son of Sarah Pearson and James M. Hobson. He was the nephew of Richmond Pearson (1852–1923) and the grandson of Justice Richmond Mumford Pearson (1805–1878). He graduated from the United States Naval Academy in 1889. He was ostracized by his fellow midshipmen for his total abstinence from alcohol and tobacco. He maintained a superb academic record, graduating first in his class and became the highest ranking midshipman: cadet battalion commander (today's brigade commander). After duty in Chicago, he underwent additional training and was appointed assistant Naval Constructor in 1891. Hobson then served at various navy yards and facilities, including a tour of duty as instructor at the Naval Academy.

== Spanish–American War ==
In the early days of the Spanish–American War, he was with Admiral William T. Sampson in New York, and arrived off Santiago on June 1, 1898. In order to bottle up the Spanish Navy squadron of Admiral Pascual Cervera y Topete during the Battle of Santiago de Cuba, Hobson took temporary command of the collier Merrimac, which he would attempt to sink as an obstruction in the channel leading to Santiago Harbor, Cuba. The attempt was made early June 3, under heavy Spanish fire, which disabled the steering gear of the collier. Hobson did sink Merrimac, but was unable to place her in the shallowest part of the channel. With his crew of six, he was picked up by Admiral Cervera himself and treated quite chivalrously.

Hobson became a hero of the American press while he was a prisoner of war in Cuba. His portrait appeared in hundreds of newspapers with embellished stories of his bravery in volunteering for what was perceived as a suicide mission. A fund was raised to aid his parents in avoiding foreclosure of their mortgage. When Hobson was released during a prisoner exchange on July 6, 1898, hundreds of American troops snapped to attention, then burst into cheers as he passed. He was deluged with speaking invitations when he returned to the United States. After dining with President William McKinley, Hobson traveled west by train en route to San Francisco and the Philippines. Crowds greeted his train at many stations, and his enthusiasm for kissing admiring young women made him a sex symbol of the Victorian age. He became a sort of celebrity during the rise of popular journalism at the turn of the century and was referred to as "the most kissed man in America."

Hobson authored a book, published in 1899, about the events surrounding the sinking of Merrimac.

== Postwar career ==
Hobson was advanced ten numbers in grade after the war and was promoted to naval constructor with the rank of lieutenant to date from June 23, 1898. Following the end of the war, he helped repair and refit captured Spanish cruisers at Cavite and at various Navy shore stations. In 1899 he became a Veteran Companion of the Pennsylvania Commandery of the Military Order of Foreign Wars. He was also a Companion of the New York Commandery of the Naval and Military Order of the Spanish War.

As of January 1, 1902 Hobson had been promoted to captain with date of rank of June 23, 1898. After an unsuccessful attempt to retire, he resigned from the Navy in 1903. His resignation prompted Secretary of the Navy William Henry Moody to reconsider and allow him to retire.

In 1933, he was awarded the Medal of Honor for his attempt to block the channel. He was the only Navy officer to receive the Medal of Honor for heroism during the Spanish–American War.

== Political career ==
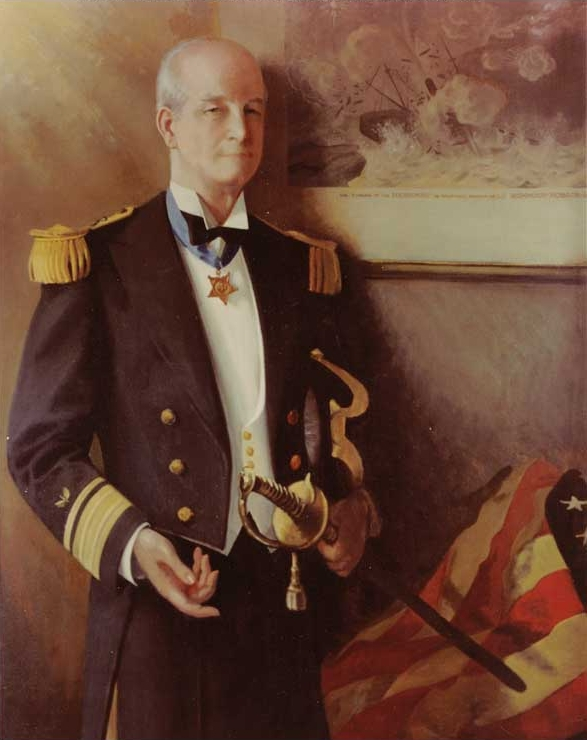
Painting of Rear Admiral Richmond P. Hobson (Retired), dated 1937. He is depicted wearing his Medal of Honor and standing before an artwork of the sinking of the USS Merrimac.

After resigning from active duty in 1903, Hobson was elected to the U.S. House of Representatives from Alabama's 6th congressional district in 1906 and was re-elected in 1908, 1910, and 1912. During his congressional service, he remained a staunch supporter of the Navy. In 1914, he opted to run for the United States Senate rather than seek re-election, but was defeated in the Democratic primary by fellow Congressman Oscar W. Underwood, the House Majority Leader. During the 1915 lame duck session, Hobson was the only congressman from the Deep South to vote for the (failed) women's suffrage bill.

In 1934, by special act of the United States Congress, he was advanced to naval constructor with a rank of rear admiral and placed on the retired list. He died on March 16, 1937, in New York City and is interred in Arlington National Cemetery in Virginia.

== Role in American drug policy ==
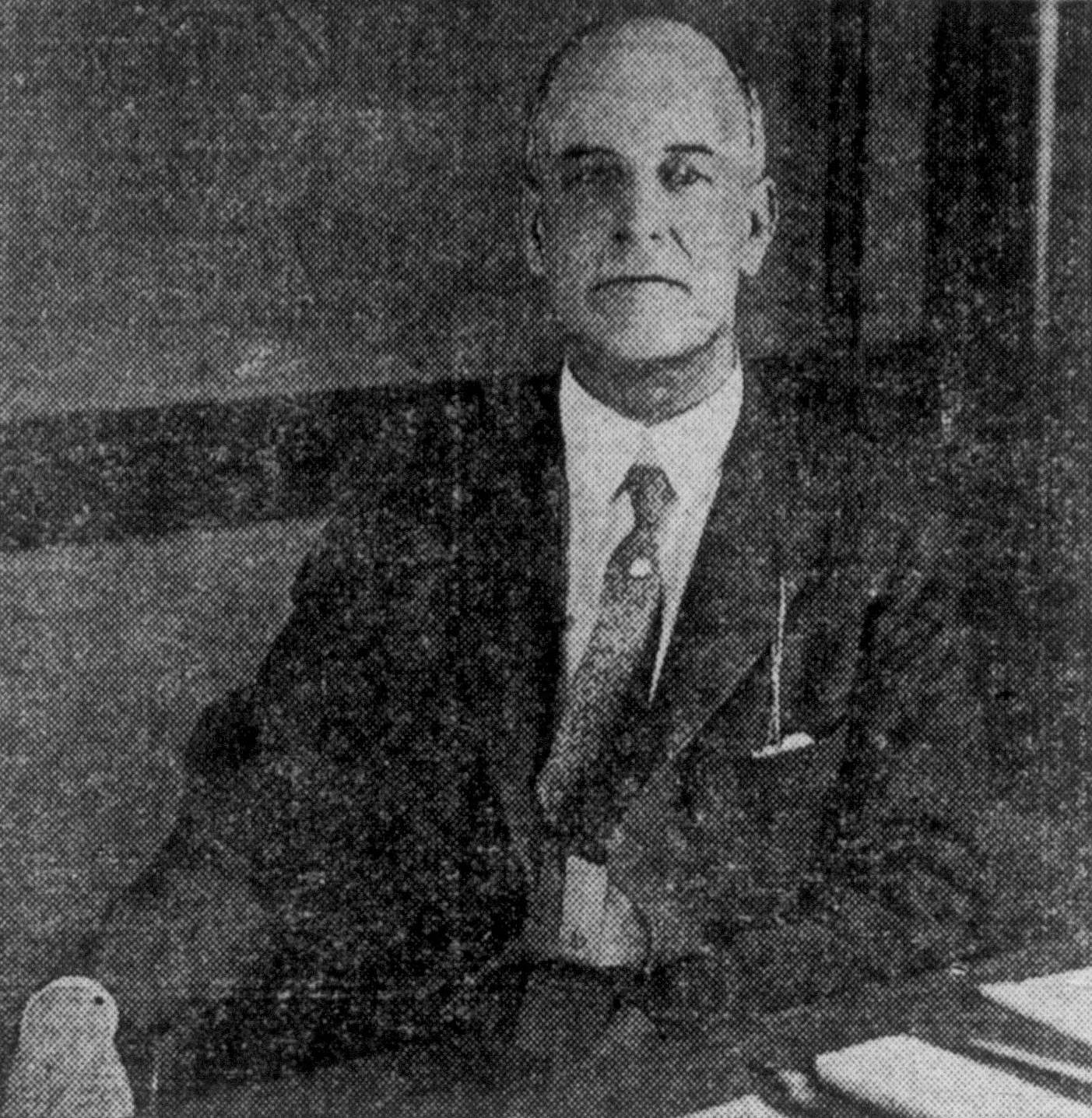
Hobson leading narcotic fight, 1923

After leaving Congress, Hobson became very active in the cause of banning drugs and alcohol, earning the nickname "The Father of American Prohibition". Hobson first became involved in the issue during the Philippine–American War when he lobbied Congress to take a tougher stand against the illegal drug trade in the Philippines. Hobson eventually came to view alcohol to be as dangerous as narcotics. In 1913, he led a major Anti-Saloon League and Women's Christian Temperance Union demonstration in Washington D.C. for a federal prohibition of alcohol in the United States. Along with Morris Sheppard, he introduced a constitutional amendment to do so in 1914, which was ratified in 1919 as the 18th Amendment. Hobson was a prolific author on this subject, writing the books Narcotic Peril (1925), The Modern Pirates-Exterminate Them (1931) and Drug Addiction: A Malignant Racial Cancer (1933), speaking on radio programs and in front of civic groups, founding the International Narcotic Education Association and lobbying his former Congressional colleagues in favor of anti-drug laws. During the 1920s and '30s, Hobson was the Anti-Saloon League's highest-paid special speaker.

== Personal life and legacy ==
In 1905, Hobson married Grizelda Houston Hull, cousin of U.S. Army General Joseph Wheeler, in Tuxedo Park, New York. The couple's son, Richmond P. "Rich" Hobson, Jr., became a rancher in Canada and wrote several popular memoirs of his time there. Hobson's nephew, James Hobson Morrison, Sr., was the Democratic congressman from the Baton Rouge-centered Sixth Congressional District of Louisiana from 1943 to 1967.

One of Hobson's close friends was the inventor Nikola Tesla. Tesla served as the best man in Hobson's wedding. In later years, Hobson was the only person who was able to persuade Tesla to interrupt his intellectual pursuits for a movie gathering.

The destroyer USS Hobson (DD-464) was named in his honor. A small town in south Texas was renamed from Castine to Hobson after he spoke there on a railroad tour. A small town in north-central Alabama, Hobson City, Alabama, also took his name.

== Medal of Honor citation ==
RADM Richmond P. Hobson receives Medal of Honor from President Franklin D. Roosevelt at the White House, 1933

Rank and organization: Lieutenant, U.S. Navy. Born: 17 August 1870, Greensboro, Ala. Accredited to: New York. (Medal presented by President, 29 April 1933.)

Citation:

In connection with the sinking of the U.S.S. Merrimac at the entrance to the fortified harbor of Santiago de Cuba, 3 June 1898. Despite persistent fire from the enemy fleet and fortifications on shore, Lt. Hobson distinguished himself by extraordinary courage and carried out this operation at the risk of his own personal safety.

== See also ==
- List of Medal of Honor recipients for the Spanish–American War

U.S. House of Representatives
Preceded by John H. Bankhead	Member of the U.S. House of Representatives from Alabama's 6th congressional district 1907–1915	Succeeded by William B. Oliver
