= Elmwood Cemetery (Birmingham, Alabama) =

Cemetery in Jefferson County, Alabama

Elmwood Cemetery and Mausoleum
- Interactive map of Elmwood Cemetery and Mausoleum

Details
- Established: 1900
- Location: Birmingham, Alabama
- Country: US
- Coordinates: 33°29′16″N 86°50′42″W
- Type: public
- Owned by: Dignity Memorial
- Size: 326 acres (1.32 km^{2})
- No. of graves: Around 140,000
- Website: Official website
- Find a Grave: Elmwood Cemetery and Mausoleum
- The Political Graveyard: Elmwood Cemetery and Mausoleum

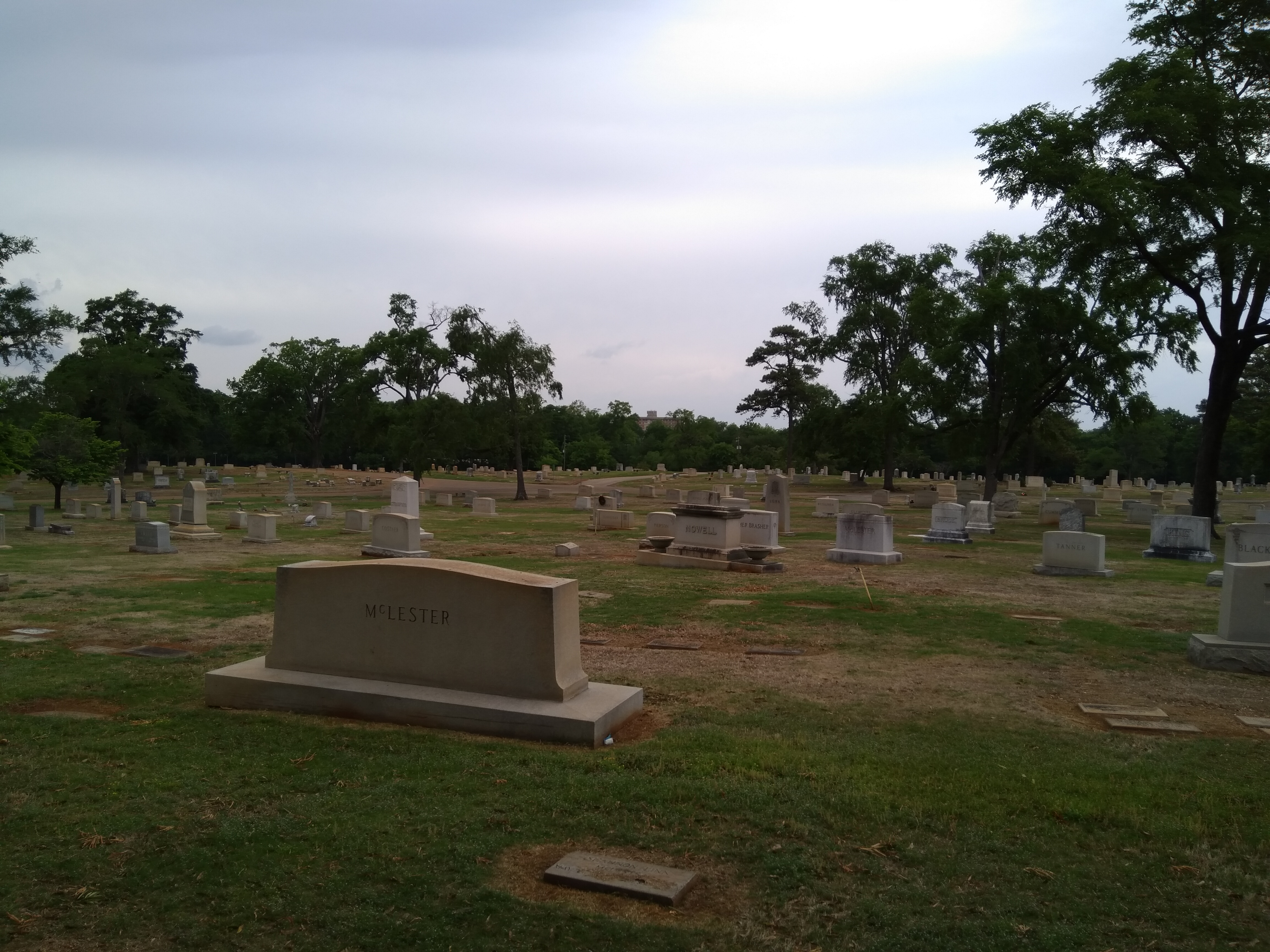
A view across some of the older burials, dating from the early 1900s

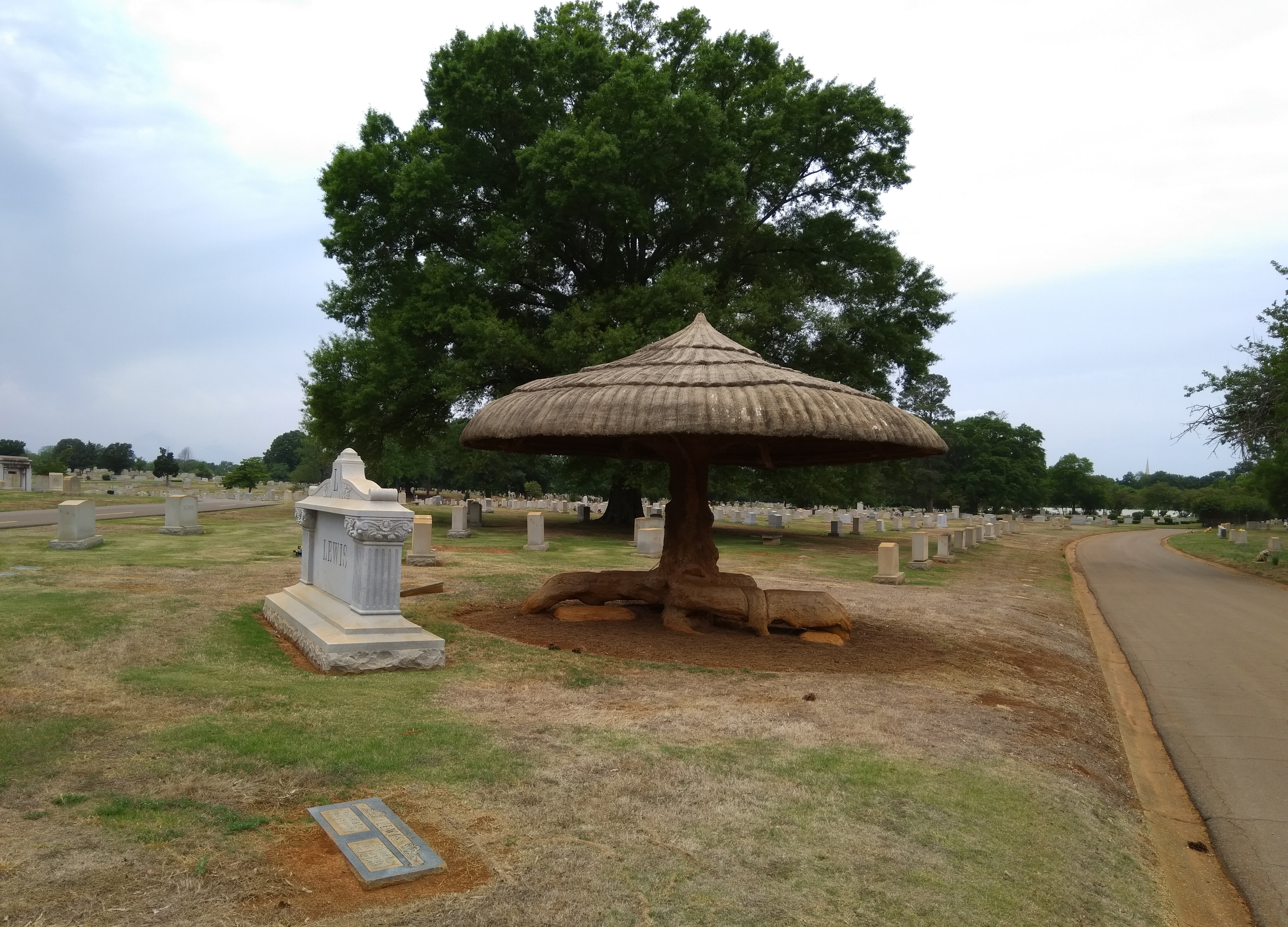
This mushroom shade is one of several concrete sculptures made by artist Dionicio Rodriguez in the 1930s that are found at Elmwood.

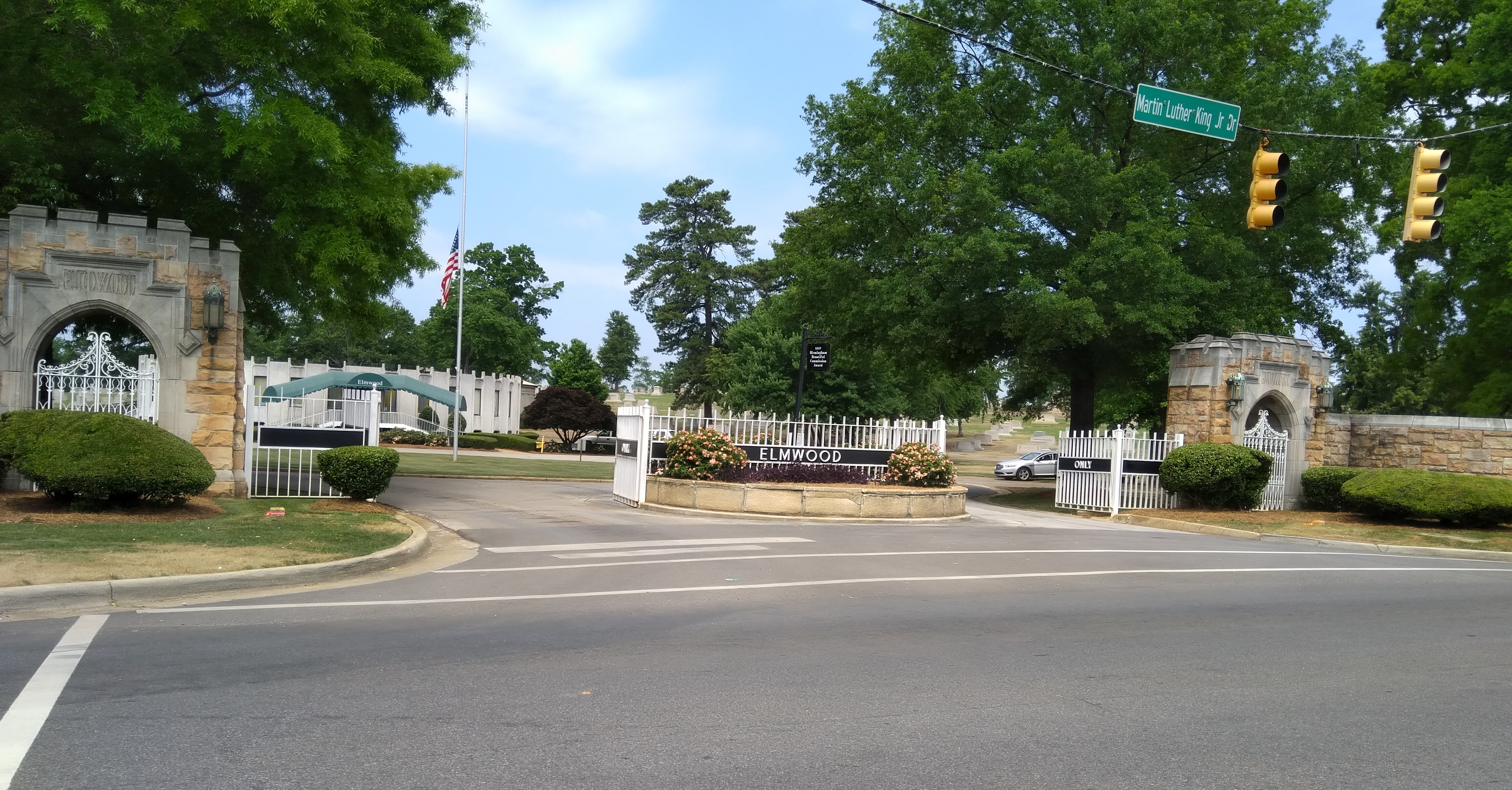

Elmwood Cemetery and Mausoleum (also known as Elm Leaf Cemetery) is a 326 acres (132 ha) cemetery established in 1900 (as Elm Leaf Cemetery) in Birmingham, Alabama northwest of Homewood by a group of fraternal organizations. It was renamed in 1906 and gradually eclipsed Oak Hill Cemetery as the most prominent burial place in the city. In 1900 it consisted of 40 acres, adding 40 more acres in 1904, 80 more acres in 1909, 80 more acres in 1910, 43 acres in 1924, and reached 286 acres in 1928.

== Background ==
In the late 1930s, Mexican sculptor Dionicio Rodriguez created a number of large concrete sculptures for the cemetery, including a palm tree, a bridge, and a fallen log 'carved' into a bench.

This cemetery was whites only until 1970 when the family of a black soldier who died in Vietnam won a lawsuit in federal court to force the cemetery to allow their son to be buried there.

Its funeral home was established in 1962 by the Lackey family for Johns-Ridout's Mortuary. This cemetery is part of the Dignity Memorial chain.

This cemetery is roughly bounded by Martin Luther King, Jr. Drive, Dennison Avenue Southwest, 14th Place Southwest, and railroad tracks. The main entrance is directly across from 6th Avenue Southwest. There is a secondary entrance on Martin Luther King Drive just behind the Johns-Ridout's Mortuary.

It is made up of about fifty large blocks, of varying shapes and sizes, each of which contains up to several hundred lots; each lot contains as many as eight or ten burial plots. As of early 2017, the cemetery contained about 130,000 burials. Notable sections include at least two areas dedicated to newborns and infants, with brass plaques that say "BABYLAND" on them. There are also four mausoleums.

Elmwood's mausoleum chapel was used for closed-casket funerals if a body had not been embalmed. Its funeral home chapel was used for open-casket funerals or closed-casket funerals whenever a body has been embalmed for both the visitation and service.

The body of 16th Street Baptist Church bombing victim, Denise McNair was exhumed from Shadow Lawn Memorial Park to this cemetery by her parents in August 2007.

== Notable burials ==
- Truman H. Aldrich (1848–1932) – U. S. Representative 1896–1897
- William W. Allen (1835–1894) – Confederate Major General
- Mary Anderson (1866–1953) – inventor of the windshield wiper
- Donald Beatty (1900–1980) – aviator, explorer and inventor
- Sydney J. Bowie (1865–1928) – U. S. Representative 1901–1907
- Paul W. "Bear" Bryant (1913–1983) – University of Alabama football coach
- Anna Lee "Boots" Carroll (1930–2017) – American theater, film & television actress
- Ben Chapman (1908–1993) – Major League baseball player and manager
- Claudette Colvin (1939-2026), Civil rights activist
- B. B. Comer (1848–1927) – Governor of Alabama 1907–1911, U. S. Senator 1920
- Father James Coyle (1873–1921) – assassinated priest of St. Paul's church
- George Gordon Crawford (1869–1936) – Industrialist and second graduate of Georgia Tech
- Russell McWhortor Cunningham (1855–1921) – Governor of Alabama 1904–1905
- Spud Davis (1904–1984) – professional baseball player and manager
- Henry T. DeBardeleben (1874–1948) – Coal magnate
- William Henry Denson (1846–1906) – U. S. Representative 1893–1895
- Eddie Dent (1887–1974) – professional baseball player
- Joe Domnanovich (1919–2009) – professional football player
- Henry Eugene "Red" Erwin, Sr. (1921–2002) – World War II veteran – Medal of Honor recipient
- William Dudley Geer (1922–2003) – first Dean of the School of Business at Samford University
- Milton L. Grafman (1907–1995) – Former Rabbi of Temple Emanuel and civil rights figure
- John Grenier (1930–2007) – Alabama Republican Party chairman
- Sam Hairston (1920–1997) – Major League baseball player
- Albert Hall (1958-2025) - Major league baseball player
- Art Hanes (1916–1997) – Mayor of Birmingham 1961–1963
- Lum Harris (1915–1996) – professional baseball manager (Houston Astros & Atlanta Braves)
- Erskine Hawkins (1914–1993) – Musician, trumpeter, composer
- Cliff Holman (1929–2008) – Birmingham television celebrity
- George Huddleston (1869–1960) – U. S. Representative 1915–1937
- George Huddleston, Jr. (1920–1971) – U. S. Representative 1955–1965
- Patti Ruffner Jacobs (1875–1935) – social reformer
- Elizabeth Johnston Evans Johnston (1851-1934) - philanthropist, social worker, and clubwoman
- Joseph Forney Johnston (1843–1913) – Governor of Alabama 1896–1900, U. S. Senator 1907–1913
- Eddie Kendricks (1939–1992) – singer, co-founder of The Temptations
- Larry Langford (1946–2019) – Alabama politician
- Dee Miles (1909–1976) – Major League baseball player
- John P. Newsome (1893–1961) – U. S. Representative 1943–1945
- Louise O. Charlton (1889–1967) – Federal Commissioner and judge, 1924–1965
- Luther Patrick (1894–1957) – U. S. Representative 1937–1943
- John C. Persons (1888-1974) - lawyer and U.S. Major General
- Sun Ra (1914–1993) – Jazz musician
- Erskine Ramsay (1864–1953) – Inventor, engineer, philanthropist
- Rufus N. Rhodes (1856–1910) – founder of the Birmingham News
- Bo Russell (1916–1997) – professional football player
- Ed Salem (1928–2001) – professional football player and restaurateur
- Albert Lee Smith, Jr. (1931–1997) – U.S. representative from Alabama's 6th congressional district from 1981 to 1983
- Fred Sington (1910–1998) – professional football player
- Jesse F. Stallings (1856–1928) – U. S. Representative 1893–1901
- Pat Sullivan (American football) (1950-2019) - Auburn football player and coach. His ashes were sprinkled in this cemetery's cremation garden.
- Oscar Underwood (1862–1929) – U. S. Senator 1915–1927
- Dixie Walker (1887–1965), Fred "Dixie" Walker's father
- Dixie Walker (1911–1982) – Major League baseball player
- Frank S. White (1847–1922) – U. S. Senator 1914–1915
- Abraham Woods (1928–2008) – minister and civil rights activist
- Yam Yaryan (1892–1964) – Major League baseball player
