= George Huddleston =

American politician

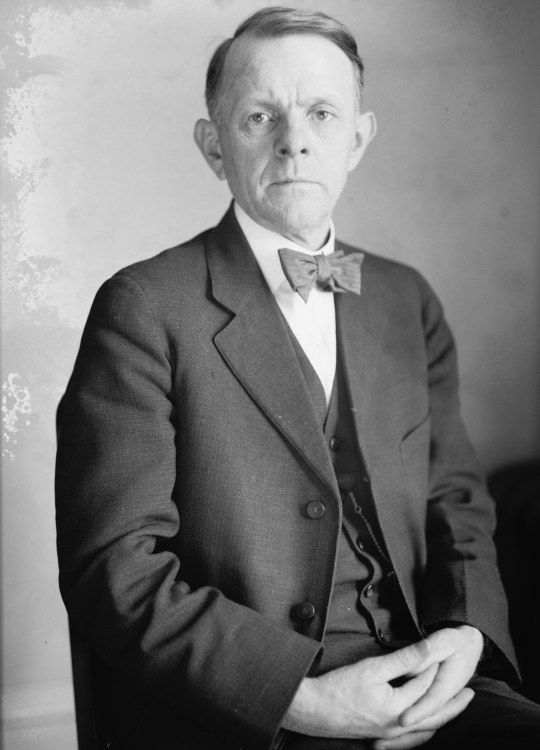
- Huddleston in 1921

Member of the U.S. House of Representatives from Alabama's 9th district
- In office March 4, 1915 – January 3, 1937
- Preceded by: Oscar W. Underwood
- Succeeded by: Luther Patrick

Personal details
- Born: November 11, 1869 Lebanon, Tennessee
- Died: February 29, 1960 (aged 90) Birmingham, Alabama
- Resting place: Elmwood Cemetery
- Party: Democratic
- Children: Nancy Huddleston Packer; George Huddleston Jr.
- Education: Cumberland School of Law
- Profession: Attorney

George Huddleston (November 11, 1869 – February 29, 1960) was a U.S. representative from Alabama, father of George Huddleston, Jr.

== Life and career ==
Huddleston was born on a farm near Lebanon, Tennessee, the son of Nancy Emeline (Sherrill) and Joseph Franklin Huddleston. Huddleston attended the common schools. He studied law at Cumberland School of Law at Cumberland University, Lebanon, Tennessee. He was admitted to the bar in 1891 and practiced in Birmingham, Alabama, until 1911, when he retired from practice.

During the Spanish–American War, Huddleston served as a private in the First Regiment, Alabama Volunteer Infantry.

Huddleston was elected as a Democrat to the Sixty-Fourth and to the ten succeeding Congresses (March 4, 1915 - January 3, 1937), representing Alabama's 9th congressional district. He generally championed progressive laws and measures. In March 1932, Huddleston addressed a committee of the United States Senate on the subject of the condition of sharecroppers, stating "Any thought that there has been no starvation, that no man has starved and no man will starve, is the rankest nonsense. Men are actually starving in their thousands today..." However, in spite of his opposition to the Ku Klux Klan and race-based violence, he did not support the Dyer Anti-Lynching Bill, fearing for how his majority-white constituency would view him if he voted for it.

Huddleston was an unsuccessful candidate for renomination in 1936, as he lost support among his constituents for opposing bills regarding public services and energy legislation. As early as Wendell Willkie in 1940, Huddleston began supporting Republican nominees for President, although he did support Strom Thurmond in 1948 when he ran under the “Democratic” label in Alabama.

Huddleston died in Birmingham on February 29, 1960, and was interred in Elmwood Cemetery.

He is the father of Nancy Packer (author), Jane Aaron, Mary Chiles, George Huddleston, and John Huddleston. He is a grandfather of the writers George Packer and Ann Packer, the children of his daughter Nancy.

== Quotes ==
- "In a time like this...it takes a lion-hearted courage for a man to stand up on his feet and dare to speak for peace." (Spoken during attempts to throw people in jail for speaking for non-intervention during World War I.)

U.S. House of Representatives
Preceded by Oscar W. Underwood	Member of the U.S. House of Representatives from Alabama's 9th congressional district 1915-1937	Succeeded by Luther Patrick
