= Brett Blackledge =

American journalist

Brett J. Blackledge (born 1963) is former editor of The Daily Advertiser in Lafayette, Louisiana. He previously worked as Regional Investigations Editor for USA Today Network in Florida and as Investigations Editor at the Naples Daily News in Florida. Before joining the Naples paper in October 2014, Blackledge was Public Service and Investigations Editor at The News Journal in Wilmington, Del. He worked as a reporter for 26 years before joining the Delaware newspaper, including working as a reporter for The Associated Press in Washington D.C. While working for The Birmingham News, he won the 2007 Pulitzer Prize for investigative reporting for a series on alleged nepotism and cronyism in Alabama's two-year college system.

Blackledge was born in Baton Rouge, Louisiana and is a 1986 alumnus of Louisiana State University. He began his career that year with the Associated Press, and later worked for The Journal Newspapers in suburban Washington, D.C., Education Daily and The Mobile Register. He went to work for The Birmingham News in 1998.

While with the News, Blackledge contributed to Alabama AP Managing Editors Association Award-winning stories on the 2003 conviction of Bobby Frank Cherry for the 1963 16th Street Baptist Church bombing.

Blackledge's multi-part investigative series on the two-year colleges delved deeply into financial records kept by the system, exposing a number of elected lawmakers on the system's payroll without clear duties. The system's chancellor was fired, federal and state investigations opened, and new safeguards for public accountability promised in the wake of the exposé. The series earned Blackledge a 2006 Alabama Associated Press Association Award. The newspaper entered the multi-part special report for the 2007 Pulitzer Prize for Public Service, and it was named a finalist in that category before the committee awarded it the prize for investigative reporting instead.
