= Victor Henry Hanson =

American publisher

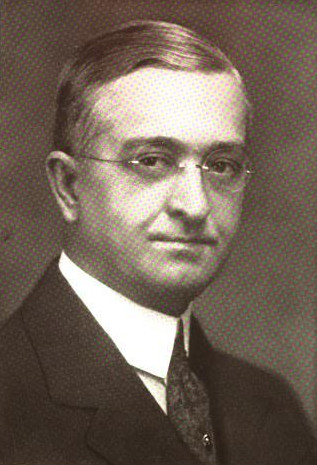
Victor Henry Hanson

Victor Henry Hanson (1876-1945) was an American publisher.

== Biography ==
Hanson was born on January 16, 1876, in Barnesville, Georgia, to Henry Clay Hanson and Anna O. (Bloodworth) Hanson. His father was a newspaperman who for years he owned and edited The Macon Telegraph and The Columbus Enquirer-Sun. Hanson attended public schools in Macon and Columbus, Georgia, and for a short while attended the Gordon Institute in Barnesville, Georgia.

When he was in primary school, Hanson founded a Saturday paper called The City Item. It was first a single-page paper, and he produced the entire paper, from typesetting to delivery. When Hanson moved from Macon to Columbus, he enlarged the paper to many times its original size, changed its name to The Columbus Times, and built up a circulation of 2,500 subscribers. Hanson employed a printer in his father's office to set the type, but solicited the advertisements, wrote the news stories, and made deliveries on horseback. When he was 15 years old, he sold his paper and its equipment for more than US$2,000 (equivalent to $71,667 in 2025).

In 1892, at the age of 16, he became advertising solicitor for Nichols & Holliday, the advertising managers for the Atlanta Constitution; he continued to work there until 1895 when he went to work for the Baltimore World as a solicitor in the classified advertising department. In June 1896 he went to work for The Montgomery Advertiser as a solicitor in the circulation department. Within three months, he was transferred to the advertising department as a solicitor, and in less than six months was in charge of the department, and by the end of the year was advertising manager in of both local and foreign advertising.

Hanson was employed continuously The Montgomery Advertiser until February 15, 1909, when he moved to Birmingham, the advertising receipts of that paper having increased through his efforts 500 percent. Upon going to Birmingham he purchased a third interest in The Birmingham News from the owner and editor, Rufus N. Rhodes, becoming with his newly acquired interests, vice-president and general manager of the paper. On March 1, 1910, shortly after Rhodes' death, Hanson purchased from his widow a majority of the interest in the paper and became its president and publisher. On September 12, 1912, a Sunday edition was launched.

Soon after his move to Birmingham, Hanson was joined by his former employer, Frank P. Glass, who purchased stock in The News and became its editor, retaining for a while his interest in The Montgomery Advertiser. This partnership was severed in 1920, when Hanson purchased Glass's interest in The News. Shortly thereafter negotiations were undertaken for the purchase of The Birmingham Ledger, which, on April 19, was formally absorbed by The News.

On January 4, 1920, Hanson announced that The Birmingham News would give a $500 loving cup each year, beginning with 1920, to that citizen of Birmingham who had during the year best served his city. In February 1921, the coal operators and striking miners composed their differences, Hanson securing from each an agreement to abide by a decision to be made by Governor Kilby.

Hanson was a Democrat but never sought office. He was a member and deacon in the Independent Presbyterian church of Birmingham, a Mason, and a Shriner.

Hanson married Weenona W. Hanson on 1897 in Uniontown. They resided in Birmingham.

Hanson died on March 7, 1945, in Birmingham, Alabama.
