= Alabama's 9th congressional district =

Former congressional district

Coordinates: 33°29′11.17″N 86°52′47.58″W

- Obsolete district
- Population (1950): 558,928
- Created: 1890
- Eliminated: 1960
- Years active: 1893–1963

Alabama's 9th congressional district was formerly apportioned to portions of central and western Alabama from 1893 until 1963 when the seat was lost due to reapportionment after the 1960 United States census.

== Highlights ==
Formed in 1893, the district was first represented by Louis Washington Turpin, a self-educated tax assessor from Hale County. The district was represented by Democrats during the whole of its existence except from 1896–1897 when Truman Heminway Aldrich, a Republican, unseated Oscar W. Underwood in a post-election contest.

The 1960 United States census and the subsequent reapportionment decreased Alabama's representation in the United States Congress.

== History ==
=== Population disparity ===
By the early 1940s the 9th district had a population of 459,930.

== List of members representing the district ==
Member	Party	Years	Cong ress	Electoral history	Counties represented
District created March 4, 1893
Louis W. Turpin (Newbern)	Democratic	March 4, 1893 – March 3, 1895	53rd	Elected in 1892. Lost renomination.	1893–1915:
Oscar W. Underwood (Birmingham)	Democratic	March 4, 1895 – June 9, 1896	54th	Elected in 1894. Lost election contest.	1893–1915:
Truman Heminway Aldrich (Birmingham)	Republican	June 9, 1896 – March 3, 1897	54th	Won election contest. Retired.	1893–1915:
Oscar W. Underwood (Birmingham)	Democratic	March 4, 1897 – March 3, 1915	55th 56th 57th 58th 59th 60th 61st 62nd 63rd	Elected in 1896. Re-elected in 1898. Re-elected in 1900. Re-elected in 1902. Re-elected in 1904. Re-elected in 1906. Re-elected in 1908. Re-elected in 1910. Re-elected in 1912. Retired to run for U.S. Senator.	1893–1915:
Oscar W. Underwood (Birmingham)	Democratic	March 4, 1897 – March 3, 1915	55th 56th 57th 58th 59th 60th 61st 62nd 63rd	Elected in 1896. Re-elected in 1898. Re-elected in 1900. Re-elected in 1902. Re-elected in 1904. Re-elected in 1906. Re-elected in 1908. Re-elected in 1910. Re-elected in 1912. Retired to run for U.S. Senator.	1903–1917:
George Huddleston (Birmingham)	Democratic	March 4, 1915 – January 3, 1937	64th 65th 66th 67th 68th 69th 70th 71st 72nd 73rd 74th	Elected in 1914. Re-elected in 1916. Re-elected in 1918. Re-elected in 1920. Re-elected in 1922. Re-elected in 1924. Re-elected in 1926. Re-elected in 1928. Re-elected in 1930. Re-elected in 1932. Re-elected in 1934. Lost renomination.	1903–1917:
George Huddleston (Birmingham)	Democratic	March 4, 1915 – January 3, 1937	64th 65th 66th 67th 68th 69th 70th 71st 72nd 73rd 74th	Elected in 1914. Re-elected in 1916. Re-elected in 1918. Re-elected in 1920. Re-elected in 1922. Re-elected in 1924. Re-elected in 1926. Re-elected in 1928. Re-elected in 1930. Re-elected in 1932. Re-elected in 1934. Lost renomination.	1917–1963:
Luther Patrick (Birmingham)	Democratic	January 3, 1937 – January 3, 1943	75th 76th 77th	Elected in 1936. Re-elected in 1938. Re-elected in 1940. Lost renomination.	1917–1963:
John P. Newsome (Birmingham)	Democratic	January 3, 1943 – January 3, 1945	78th	Elected in 1942. Lost renomination.	1917–1963:
Luther Patrick (Birmingham)	Democratic	January 3, 1945 – January 3, 1947	79th	Elected in 1944. Lost renomination.	1917–1963:
Laurie C. Battle (Birmingham)	Democratic	January 3, 1947 – January 3, 1955	80th 81st 82nd 83rd	Elected in 1946. Re-elected in 1948. Re-elected in 1950. Re-elected in 1952. Retired.	1917–1963:
George Huddleston Jr. (Birmingham)	Democratic	January 3, 1955 – January 3, 1963	84th 85th 86th 87th	Elected in 1954. Re-elected in 1956. Re-elected in 1958. Re-elected in 1960. Redistricted to the at-large district.	1917–1963:
District eliminated January 3, 1963

== Historical boundaries ==
Census year	Population	Counties
1890	181,085	Bibb, Blount, Hale, Jefferson, Perry
1900	213,820	Bibb, Blount, Jefferson, Perry
1910	226,476	Jefferson
1920	310,054	Jefferson
1930	431,493	Jefferson
1940	459,930	Jefferson
1950	558,928	Jefferson
