= 1898 Alabama gubernatorial election =

- August 1, 1898
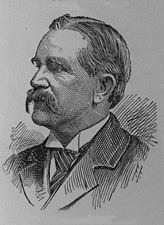

Nominee	Joseph F. Johnston	Gilbert B. Dean
Party	Democratic	Populist
Popular vote	110,551	50,052
Percentage	66.98%	30.32%
- County results Johnston: 40–50% 50–60% 60–70% 70–80% 80–90% >90% Dean: 40–50% 50–60% 60–70% No Data
Governor before election
Joseph F. Johnston
Democratic
Elected Governor
Joseph F. Johnston
Democratic

The 1898 Alabama gubernatorial election took place on August 1, 1898, in order to elect the governor of Alabama. Incumbent Democrat Joseph F. Johnston ran for a second term in office.

== Results ==
1898 Alabama gubernatorial election
Party	Candidate	Votes	%
Democratic	Joseph F. Johnston (incumbent)	110,551	66.98
Populist	Gilbert B. Dean	50,052	30.32
Colored Republican	Andrew J. Warner	3,084	1.90
Prohibition	W. B. Witherspoon	1,327	0.80
Total votes		165,014	100.00
Democratic hold			
