= George Huddleston Jr. =

American politician

George Huddleston
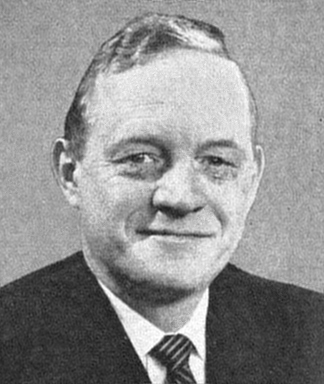

Member of the U.S House of Representatives from Alabama
- In office January 3, 1955 – January 3, 1965
- Preceded by: Laurie C. Battle
- Succeeded by: John Buchanan (redistricting)
- Constituency: 9th district (1955-1963); At-large (1963-1965)

Personal details
- Born: March 19, 1920 Birmingham, Alabama, U.S.
- Died: September 14, 1971 (aged 51)
- Party: Democratic
- Relations: George Huddleston (father)
- Education: Birmingham–Southern College (BA); University of Alabama (LLB)

Military service
- Branch/service: United States Navy
- Years of service: 1942–1946

George Huddleston Jr. (March 19, 1920 – September 14, 1971) was an American lawyer and politician who served as a member of the United States House of Representatives from Alabama.

== Early life and education ==
Huddleston was born in Birmingham, Alabama. He was the son of George Huddleston, who represented the Birmingham area in Congress from 1915 to 1937. The younger Huddleston attended George Washington University for one year before transferring to Birmingham–Southern College, from which he graduated in 1941. After serving in the United States Navy from 1942 to 1946, he earned his law degree from the University of Alabama School of Law in 1948.

== Career ==
Huddleston served as deputy circuit solicitor for Alabama's 10th circuit from 1949 to 1952, then served as an assistant United States attorney before entering private practice.

Huddleston was elected to his father's old congressional seat in 1954, and was reelected four times. Having signed the 1956 Southern Manifesto that opposed the desegregation of public schools ordered by the Supreme Court in Brown v. Board of Education, he voted against the Civil Rights Act of 1957. In 1964, he was defeated by Republican John Buchanan, losing by a 21-point margin.

Huddleston remained in the capital as a senior officer with North American Rockwell until his death in 1971. He is buried in Birmingham's Elmwood Cemetery.

U.S. House of Representatives
Preceded by Laurie C. Battle	Member of the U.S. House of Representatives from Alabama's 9th congressional district 1955-1963	Succeeded by District inactive
Preceded by District inactive	Member of the U.S. House of Representatives from Alabama's at-large congressional district 1963-1965	Succeeded by District inactive
