= Laurie C. Battle =

American politician (1912–2000)

Laurie Calvin Battle
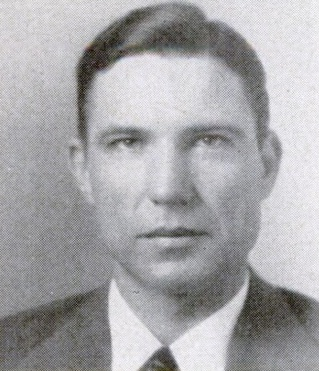
- Battle, c. 1953

Member of the U.S. House of Representatives from Alabama's 9th district
- In office January 3, 1947 – January 3, 1955
- Preceded by: Luther Patrick
- Succeeded by: George Huddleston Jr.

Personal details
- Born: May 10, 1912 Wilsonville, Alabama, U.S.
- Died: May 2, 2000 (aged 87) Bethesda, Maryland, U.S.
- Education: Birmingham–Southern College; Vanderbilt University; Scarritt College; Ohio State University

Laurie Calvin Battle (May 10, 1912 – May 2, 2000) was a U.S. representative from Alabama. He was in the United States Army Air Forces and served in the Asiatic-Pacific Theater during World War II.

== Biography ==
Born in Wilsonville, Alabama, Battle graduated from Deshler High School in Tuscumbia, Alabama in 1930.

He received his Bachelor of Arts from Birmingham–Southern College, Birmingham, Alabama, 1934. He attended Vanderbilt University, Nashville, Tennessee, and Scarritt College, Nashville, Tennessee, 1934 and 1935. He received a Master of Arts in sociology from Ohio State University, Columbus, Ohio, in 1939.

He attended the University of Alabama in 1946. He was in the United States Army Air Forces from February 19, 1942, to March 6, 1946, and served in the Asiatic-Pacific Theater during World War II. He was in the United States Air Force Reserve from 1946 to 1972 and retired as a colonel. He worked as a farm laborer, as a professor at Ohio State University in Columbus, Ohio in 1940, as an insurance agent, and as a professional advocate.

Battle was elected as a Democrat to the 80th, ousting the incumbent Democrat, and to the three succeeding Congresses, serving from January 3, 1947, to January 3, 1955. He was not a candidate for renomination in 1954, but was an unsuccessful candidate for the Democratic nomination for the United States Senate. He served as staff director and counsel of the House Rules Committee, hired by Chair Howard Smith from 1966 to 1976. In 1968 he unsuccessfully sought the Democratic nomination from Smith's old district. His legislative record included an enactment to block the United States from giving aid to countries that shipped goods “of primary strategic significance” to Soviet-dominated countries. That gave him the rare distinction of having his name associated with a statute – the Battle Act. He served as special adviser to the United States League of Savings Associations in Washington, D.C. from 1976 to 1988.

He died on May 2, 2000, in Bethesda, Maryland, and is interred in Arlington National Cemetery in Arlington, Virginia.

U.S. House of Representatives
Preceded by Luther Patrick	Member of the U.S. House of Representatives from Alabama's 9th congressional district 1947-1955	Succeeded by George Huddleston, Jr.
