= Luther Patrick =

American politician (1894–1957)

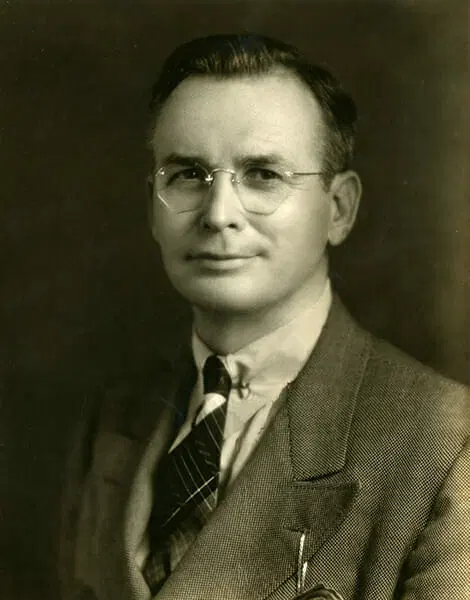

Member of the U.S. House of Representatives from Alabama's 9th district
- In office January 3, 1945 – January 3, 1947
- Preceded by: John P. Newsome
- Succeeded by: Laurie C. Battle
- In office January 3, 1937 – January 3, 1943
- Preceded by: George Huddleston
- Succeeded by: John P. Newsome

Personal details
- Born: January 23, 1894 near Decatur, Alabama, U.S.
- Died: May 26, 1957 (aged 63) Birmingham, Alabama, U.S.
- Resting place: Elmwood Cemetery
- Party: Democratic
- Education: University of Alabama at Tuscaloosa, law degree

Military service
- Allegiance: United States
- Branch/service: United States Army
- Unit: Central Officers' Training School
- Battles/wars: World War I

Luther Patrick (January 23, 1894 – May 26, 1957) was a U.S. representative from Alabama.

== Early life ==
Born near Decatur, Alabama, Patrick attended the local public schools, Louisiana State University at Baton Rouge, and Purdue University, Lafayette, Indiana. He graduated from the law department of the University of Alabama at Tuscaloosa in 1918. During the First World War, Patrick served as a private. He was assigned to the Army training detachment and to the Central Officers' Training School, from June 14, 1918, to December 4, 1918. He was admitted to the bar in 1919 and commenced practice in Fairfield, Alabama. He was author of many poems and books.

He served as the city attorney of Fairfield from 1920 until 1922. He began a career as a radio commentator in 1925. He served as assistant attorney general of Alabama 1927–1929. He served as assistant United States district attorney of the northern Alabama district in 1933 and 1934.

== Political career ==
Patrick was elected as a Democrat to the Seventy-fifth. He ran in the Democratic primary that constituted the competitive contest in Alabama at the time on a platform that ardently supported President Roosevelt's New Deal. He successfully defeated incumbent Congressman George Huddleston on this platform in 1936 in a hard-fought campaign that saw Congressman Huddleston strike Patrick with a sauce bottle in a restaurant after a heated argument.

He was reelected to the Seventy-sixth and Seventy-seventh Congresses. He was an unsuccessful candidate for renomination in 1942, and served as a consultant to the War Production Board in 1943 and 1944, before winning back his seat in the Seventy-ninth Congress (January 3, 1945 – January 3, 1947). He was an unsuccessful candidate for renomination in 1946 and resumed law practice in Birmingham, Alabama. He served as delegate to the Democratic National Convention in 1956.

According to Variety: "Patrick, running as a radio wit and debunker, astonished seasoned politicians when he ran without a platform, without professing to know anything about complex economic problems and without promising anybody anything."

== Death ==
His death occurred in Birmingham, Alabama. He was interred in Elmwood Cemetery.

U.S. House of Representatives
Preceded by George Huddleston	Member of the U.S. House of Representatives from Alabama's 9th congressional district 1937-1943	Succeeded by John P. Newsome
Preceded by John P. Newsome	Member of the U.S. House of Representatives from Alabama's 9th congressional district 1945-1947	Succeeded by Laurie C. Battle
