= William Dudley Geer =

American academic administrator (1922–2003)

Dr. William Dudley "Billy" Geer (December 25, 1922 - October 3, 2003), also known as W. D. Geer, was a Christian educator who served as the first Dean of the School of Business at Samford University in Birmingham, Alabama. His research interests focused on finance, insurance, applied economic analysis, real estate, and economic history.

== Early life ==
Geer was born on December 25, 1922, in Augusta, Georgia, to William Frederick Geer and Ida Gilmore Fuller; he was the eldest of four children. He graduated from the Richmond Academy in 1941. Geer's first job was as an office boy at The Augusta Chronicle, and later worked for the Citizens & Southern National Bank as a utility clerk, general ledger bookkeeper and teller. While working at the bank, he was assigned to the 45th Infantry Division of the U.S. Army Signal Corps as a code clerk during World War II (February 1943 - November 1945).

After returning from the war, Geer attended Stetson University for his Bachelor of Science in General Business (1949) and Master of Arts in Economics (1950). He was married in 1950 to Lucy Elizabeth Durner, a fellow Stentson graduate. Geer then completed his Doctorate of Business Administration in Finance in 1964 at the Indiana University Bloomington in Indiana. Geer was also a Chartered Life Underwriter (CLU) of The American College.

== Teaching career ==
Geer started his teaching career at Mars Hill College, located in Mars Hill, North Carolina in 1951. In 1953, he became an Associate Professor of Business and Economics at Mississippi College, in Clinton, Mississippi. In 1956, he returned to his alma mater, Stetson University where he served as Assistant Professor of Economics in 1956. He joined the faculty of Samford University in 1959 as an Associate Professor of Economics, becoming a full professor in 1963. He also became chairman of the Division of Business in 1964 and the first Dean when the division was elevated to school status in 1966.

He also served as a visiting faculty member of the School of Banking of the South at Louisiana State University in Baton Rouge during the summers of 1968 to 1972 and became the first holder of the Margaret Gage Bush Professorship at Samford University in 1986. He was a member of Alpha Kappa Psi Professional Business Fraternity, and the honor societies of Beta Gamma Sigma, Phi Alpha Theta, Phi Kappa Phi and Phi Eta Sigma. In 1962 he received the designation Chartered Life Underwriter from the American College of Life Underwriters.

He was a member of the Southern Business Administration Association, serving as president 1971–72; the Council of Business School Deans for the Alabama Commission on Higher Education; the Alabama Academy of Science, serving as vice-president of the Economics and Industry Section; Alabama Council on Economic Education Board of Directors; the Southern Risk and Insurance Association; American Finance Association; Financial Management Association; Southwestern Finance Association; Eastern Finance Association; American Risk and Insurance Association; American Society of Chartered Life Underwriters, Birmingham Chapter of the American Society of Chartered Life Underwriters, American Economic Association; and the Southern Economic Association. Professionally, he contributed extensively to a number of journals and publications published throughout Alabama and other parts of the U.S.

He served as trustee and chairman of the executive committee of the Annuity Board of the Southern Baptist Convention; chairman of the Birmingham Consumer Advisory Council; a member of the Board of Management - Five Points YMCA; trustee of the Birmingham Fabricating Company - Birmingham Bolt Company Bargaining Unit Employees Pension Fund; a member of the Education Committee of the Alabama Real Estate Committee; the Research Committee of the Birmingham Area Chamber of Commerce and the Alabama Post Secondary 1202 Commission - Task force III.

== Personal life ==
He married Lucy “Elizabeth” Durner on December 18, 1949, in DeLand, Florida, with whom he later had three children.

He was a volunteer with the American Red Cross, the Downtown Firehouse Mission, Rotary Club, United Way and Miles College Accounting Advisory Council.

He was active throughout his life in the Southern Baptist Convention and was elected Deacon in 1964 at Southside Baptist Church in Birmingham. He continued his service at the First Baptist Church of Birmingham until his death on October 3, 2003. He was buried in Elmwood Cemetery, Birmingham.

== List of publications and research ==
"Forecast 1975: An Economic Outlook," with Dr. Fred N. Hendon, Dixie Contractor, January 3, 1975.

== References and related sources ==
- http://alabamaacademyofscience.org/
