= John P. Newsome =

American politician

John Parks Newsome
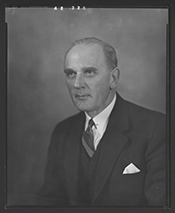

Member of the U.S. House of Representatives from Alabama's 9th district
- In office January 3, 1943 – January 3, 1945
- Preceded by: Luther Patrick
- Succeeded by: Luther Patrick

Personal details
- Born: February 13, 1893 Memphis, Tennessee, U.S.
- Died: November 10, 1961 (aged 68) Birmingham, Alabama, U.S.
- Resting place: Elmwood Cemetery
- Party: Democratic

John Parks Newsome (February 13, 1893 – November 10, 1961) was a U.S. representative from Alabama.

== Biography ==
Newsome was born in Memphis, Tennessee. He spent his youth in Thompsons Station, Tennessee. He attended school there, and later attended Battle Ground Academy in nearby Franklin.

Following graduation Newsome worked in a wholesale hardware company, beginning in 1912. He became a salesman for the company the following year (1913), and remained in that capacity until leaving to serve in World War I. He received a commission as first lieutenant in the US Army on 27 November 1917, and was promoted to Infantry Captain (Fifth Division), where he served until April 29, 1919. He returned to his sales position and remained there until 1920, when he became president and treasurer of an electrical company.

== World War II ==
After World War II broke out Newsome served as Chair of Appeals Board 2, State of Alabama Selective Service System. He was in that position in 1942–1943. He was elected on the Democratic ticket to the Seventy-eighth Congress in November 1942. He served from January 3, 1943, until January 3, 1945, having made an unsuccessful bid for re-election in November 1944.

Newsome served as president of Associated Industries of Alabama (1953–1955). He also served as a director of Exchange Security Bank, and Alabama Gas Corporation.

Newsome died in Birmingham, Alabama, on November 10, 1961. He was interred in Elmwood Cemetery in that city.

U.S. House of Representatives
Preceded by Luther Patrick	Member of the U.S. House of Representatives from Alabama's 9th congressional district 1943-1945	Succeeded by Luther Patrick
