= Frank White (Alabama politician) =

Democratic U.S. Senator from Alabama

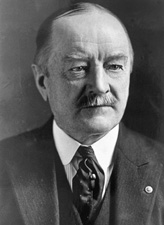

United States Senator from Alabama
- In office May 11, 1914 – March 3, 1915
- Preceded by: Joseph F. Johnston
- Succeeded by: Oscar Underwood

Member of the Mississippi House of Representatives
- In office 1875; 1882-1883

Personal details
- Born: March 13, 1847 Prairie Point, Mississippi
- Died: August 1, 1922 (aged 75) Birmingham, Alabama
- Party: Democratic

Military service
- Allegiance: Confederate States of America
- Branch/service: Confederate States Army
- Rank: Private
- Unit: Company F, First Mississippi Cavalry
- Battles/wars: American Civil War

Francis Shelley White (March 13, 1847 – August 1, 1922) was a U.S. senator from the state of Alabama. Born in Noxubee County, Mississippi, he became a lawyer and served in the Civil War. He was elected to the Mississippi House of Representatives and then moved to Birmingham, Alabama to practice law. In 1914, he was elected to the U.S. Senate in a special election to fill the term left by the death of Joseph F. Johnston and served from May 11, 1914, to March 4, 1915. He did not run for reelection. His interment was located in Birmingham's Elmwood Cemetery.

Party political offices
First	Democratic nominee for U.S. Senator from Alabama (Class 3); 1914 (sp)	Succeeded by Oscar Underwood
U.S. Senate
Preceded by Joseph F. Johnston	U.S. senator (Class 3) from Alabama; 11 May 1914 – 4 March 1915; Served alongside: John H. Bankhead	Succeeded by Oscar Underwood
