= The Birmingham News =

Newspaper published in Birmingham, Alabama

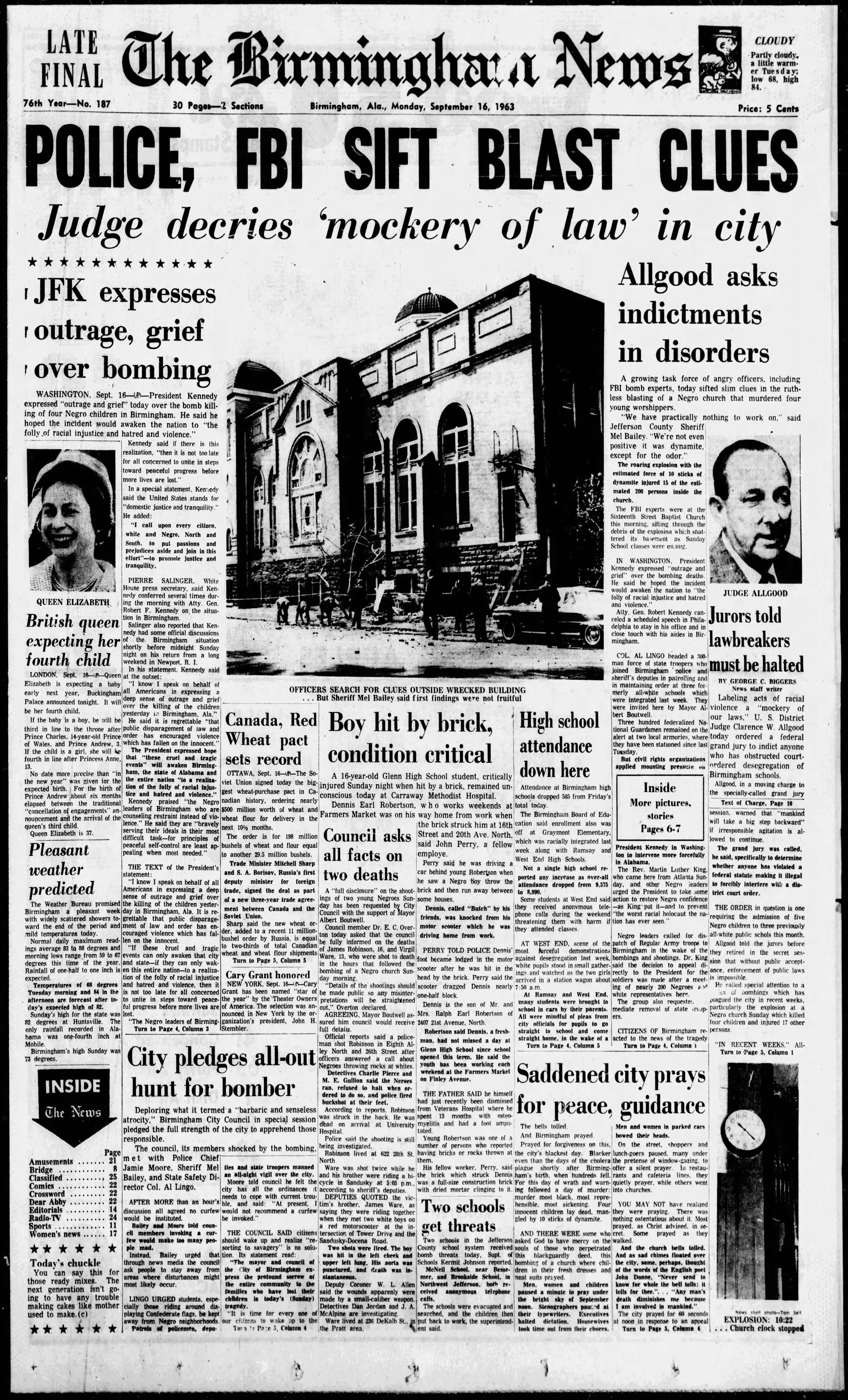
- Front page on September 16, 1963, after the 16th Street Baptist Church bombing
- Type: Daily newspaper (1888–2012); Sunday-Wednesday-Friday (September 2012–February 2023)
- Format: Broadsheet
- Owner: Advance Publications
- Founded: "The News": (unknown); The Evening News: 1888; The Daily News: 1889; The Birmingham News: 1895
- Ceased publication: February 26, 2023
- Headquarters: 1725 1st Avenue North; Birmingham, Alabama 35203; US
- Circulation: 30,000 (est.)
- Sister newspapers: The Huntsville Times; Press-Register (Mobile)
- ISSN: 0899-0050
- Website: al.com/birmingham

The Birmingham News was the principal newspaper for Birmingham, Alabama, United States in the latter half of the 20th century and the first quarter of the 21st. The paper was owned by Advance Publications and was a daily newspaper from its founding through September 30, 2012. After that day, the News and its two sister Alabama newspapers, the Press-Register in Mobile and The Huntsville Times, moved to a thrice-weekly print-edition publication schedule (Sundays, Wednesdays and Fridays).

The News and its sister newspapers published their final print edition on February 26, 2023, after almost 135 years of publication. Their digital operation, AL.com, survives.

== History ==
The Birmingham News was launched on March 14, 1888, by Rufus N. Rhodes as The Evening News, a four-page paper with two reporters and $800 of operating capital. At the time, the city of Birmingham was only 17 years old, but was an already booming industrial city and a beacon of the "New South" still recovering from the aftermath of the American Civil War and Reconstruction. Newspapers joined with industrial tycoons, academics and real-estate speculators in relentless boosterism of the new city. Prior to starting the paper, Rhodes worked as editor of the city's Daily Herald. However, he and the publisher had a falling out over a proposed public works project. Rhodes supported construction of a viaduct across "Railroad Reservation" dividing north and south Birmingham. The Herald's publisher opposed the project. The dispute ended with Rhodes leaving to launch the News with the slogan "Great is Birmingham and The News is its Prophet!" The "News Bridge" (21st Street Viaduct) was dedicated on July 4, 1891, which Rhodes' paper hailed as the "grandest of all municipal achievements of great and glorious Birmingham."

The News circulation grew from 628 in 1888 to more than 7,000 in 1891, when it became the largest daily in Alabama and won the contract to publish the General Laws of Alabama. The name changed first to The Evening News, then The Daily News, and, in 1895, The Birmingham News. The newspaper continued to grow, reaching a circulation of 17,000 in 1909.

Staunchly progressive in its political stance, the News supported a straight-ticket Democrat platform in election seasons and championed progressive causes such as prohibition. The News led the drumbeat for the "Greater Birmingham" movement to annex suburban communities. The successful campaign caused the population of the City of Birmingham to grow from 40,000 in 1900 to 138,685 in 1910, at which time Birmingham was the third largest city in the South. That same year, Rhodes died and was succeeded by his vice-president and general manager, Victor H. Hanson (1876–1945).

Hanson, only 33 years old, was already an accomplished newspaperman, having at age 11 founded the City Item in Macon, Georgia, which he sold four years later for $2,500. Hanson helped modernize the newspaper's format, tone and operations and oversaw an increase in subscriptions from 18,000 in 1910 to 40,000 in 1914, when he boldly claimed the title of "The South's Greatest Newspaper". In 1912, the evening paper launched a Sunday edition in direct competition with the morning Age-Herald. By 1920, the News dominated the lucrative Sunday market. Its edition had a circulation of 48,055, compared to 29,795 for the Age-Herald.

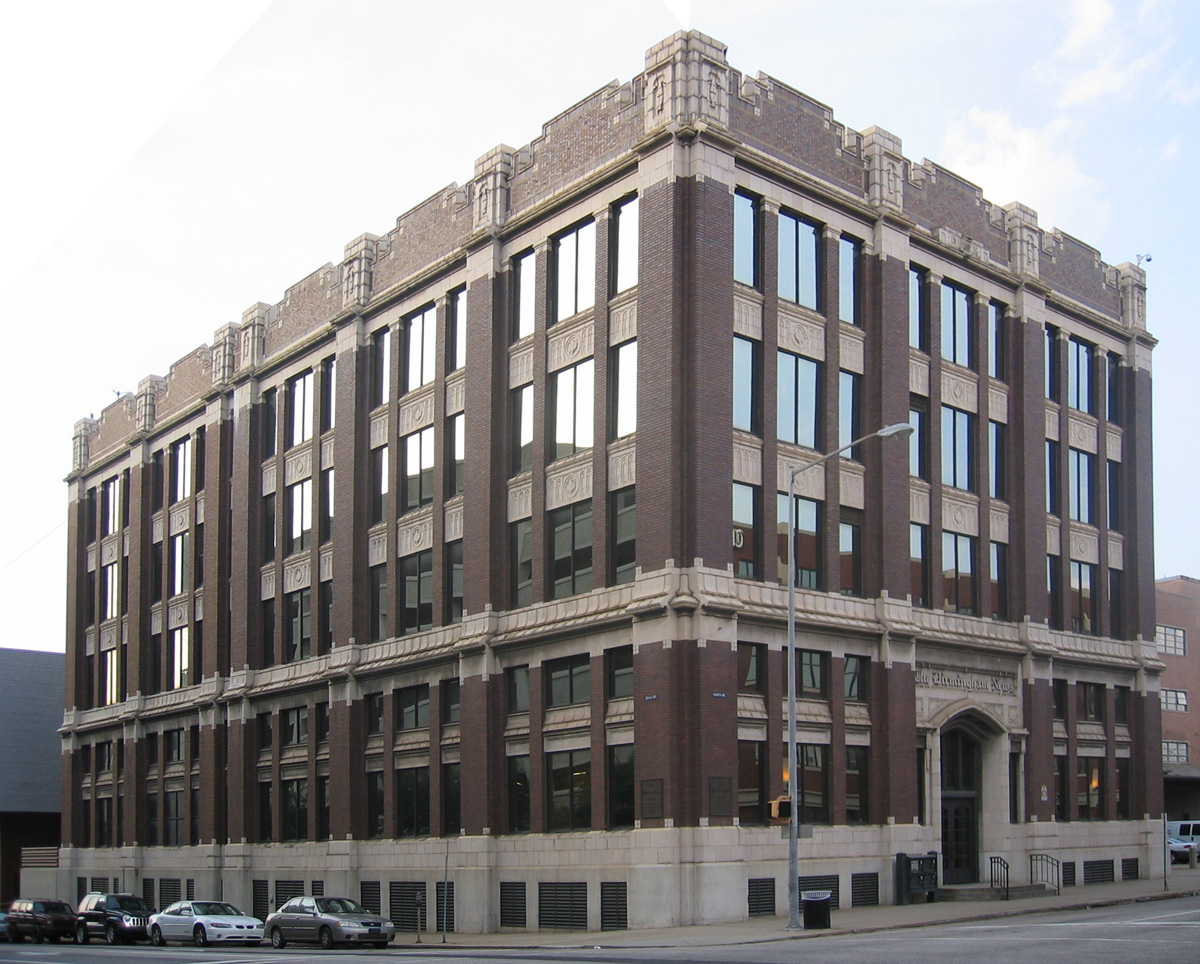
The 1917 Birmingham News building, vacated in 2006 and demolished in 2008

In 1917 the News moved to a new six-story Jacobean-style office building on the corner of 4th Avenue North and 22nd Street. At the time of the move, the News published this opinion: "The News is proud of its new home and believes it to be the handsomest and best equipped in the entire South. Publishers from other cities have been kind enough to say that nowhere in the land was there a more adequate, convenient and efficient newspaper plant. Many thousands of dollars have been expended with that end in view."

=== Acquisitions ===
A year later the paper made good use of its new space by purchasing the rival Birmingham Ledger, increasing the size of its staff to 748 and its circulation to 60,000.

In 1927 the Birmingham Age-Herald was sold to Hanson, who continued publishing both papers. In 1950 Scripps-Howard, which already owned the Birmingham Post, bought the Age-Herald but entered into a joint-operating agreement that moved the new Birmingham Post-Herald into the Birmingham News building. The News press printed both papers and handled advertising and subscriptions sales while the editorial and reporting staffs remained independent. The agreement lasted until the Post-Herald ceased publication in September 2005, leaving the News as Birmingham's only daily newspaper.

=== Sale ===
In 1956, the Hanson family sold the News to S. I. Newhouse Sr.'s Advance Publications in New York for $18 million, the largest sum that had been paid at the time for a daily newspaper. The privately held Advance continues to own the News as well as The Huntsville Times and Mobile's Press-Register, the three largest newspapers in Alabama, as well as their shared website, al.com.

In 1997, the News Company switched the morning and evening publications, making the News the morning paper and the Post-Herald the evening paper. This move reinforced the News's preeminent role as morning papers were the norm.

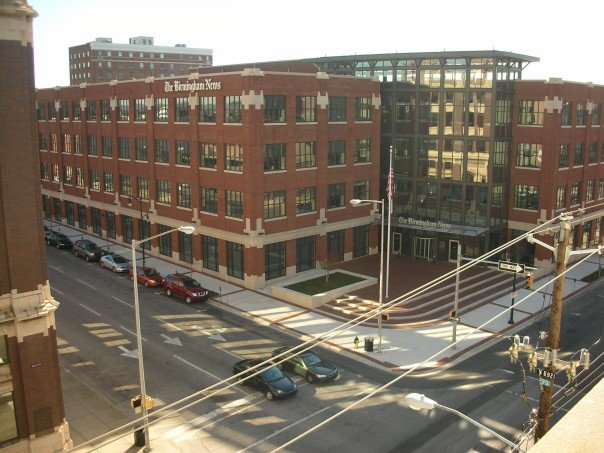
Building built for The Birmingham News in 2006, but put on the market and vacated by The News in 2014 after Alabama Media Group could no longer afford the building.

On August 10, 2006, the News cut the ribbon on their new headquarters building across 4th Avenue from their 1917 plant. The $25 million, 4-story, 110,000-square-foot (10,000 m^{2}) brick and limestone building, designed by Williams-Blackstock Architects, borrows several details from the older building and is dramatically bisected by a glass atrium. The 1917 building was demolished in 2008 in order to make room for a surface parking lot serving employees of the paper. The lot is between the new office building and the facility that houses The Birmingham News presses. On January 22, 2013, Alabama Media Group announced it was selling the building, saying the high-tech, modern and open facility was not conducive to its digital-first, print-last operations.

In 2009, Advance Publications' three Alabama newspapers were organized into the Advance Alabama Group, headed by Ricky Mathews, publisher of the Mobile newspaper. Although Advance had owned the News since 1956, the Hanson family continued to run the business until December 1, 2009, when Victor H. Hanson III (1956–), retired at the age of 52. Hanson was replaced by Pam Siddall, previously the publisher of The Wichita Eagle and The Columbus Ledger-Enquirer.

In 2011, the News acquired Birmingham magazine from the Birmingham Business Alliance.

The Birmingham News maintained bureaus in Montgomery and Washington, D.C. The Washington bureau was closed in September 2012.

The Birmingham News moved out of its 2006 building in 2014, after its owners cut back publication and could no longer afford to occupy the large building. The News moved into a renovated old warehouse a few blocks away, with the 2006 building on the market. In 2015, Infinity Property & Casualty Corp. purchased the old News building for $20 million.

=== Statistics and facts ===
The Birmingham News in 1888 cost on average $5 a year and 25 cents for three months, compared to 2013, when it costs $35 for thirteen weeks. Between 1888 and 1895 it jumped from just 18,000 subscribers to 40,000. This leap was due to not only a booming city, but also a rise in literacy rates and a middle class that was growing with increasing numbers of blue-collar jobs with increasing development of resources such as coal and cotton.

At its peak, The Birmingham News reached more than 215,000 readers a week.

=== Print-edition cutbacks ===
On May 24, 2012, Advance Publications announced that its three Alabama newspapers would do away with print editions on Mondays, Tuesdays, Thursdays and Saturdays. The move was a result of the continuing decline in advertising revenue and circulation for its traditional print products. The move places increased emphasis on their website, al.com, and reorganizes the Alabama properties into two companies: Alabama Media Group, the editorial and advertising side; and Advance Central Services Alabama, which handles production, distribution and back-office services.

The changes took effect on October 1, 2012, making Birmingham the second-largest city in the United States to not be served by a daily newspaper; New Orleans became the largest that same day. New Orleans lost that dubious distinction when Baton Rouge's daily newspaper, The Advocate, began publication of a daily edition in New Orleans; further, on June 24, 2013, The Times-Picayune resumed daily publication with a tabloid edition called "TP Street" sold only through newsstands and retailers. The owners of The Advocate bought The Times-Picayune in 2019 and merged the two into one daily newspaper.

With the changes in New Orleans, Birmingham became the largest city in the country without its own daily newspaper and remained so until the Pittsburgh Post-Gazette reduced publication from daily to five editions per week in 2018, then to twice a week in 2021.

On November 3, 2022, Advance management announced that the News, as well as its sister newspapers in Huntsville and Mobile, would discontinue its print edition on February 26, 2023, and convert to an all-digital operation.

=== Editorial stance ===
According to the paper in 2017, when offering a political endorsement, it generally skews toward the Republican Party with a few exceptions. The paper endorsed Democrat Hillary Clinton in the 2016 United States presidential election, and on November 18, 2017, it endorsed Democrat Doug Jones in the 2017 U.S. Senate special election in Alabama.

== Honors ==
Former Birmingham News reporter Victor Gold was in 1964 an aide to U.S. Senator Barry Goldwater and subsequently the press secretary to Vice President Spiro T. Agnew. He was also affiliated with President George H. W. Bush.

In 1991, Ron Casey, Harold Jackson and Joey Kennedy received a Pulitzer Prize for Editorial Writing for their editorial campaign analyzing inequities in Alabama's tax system and proposing needed reforms.

In 2006, staff photographer Bernard Troncale took top honors at the Society of Professional Journalists' Green Eyeshade Awards for his work on a series about AIDS in Africa.

In 2006 the News editorial staff were finalists for another Pulitzer for Editorial Writing for a series of editorials reversing the paper's longstanding support of the death penalty. That same year the paper won two Awards of Excellence from the Society for News Design for the paper's overall graphic layout.

In 2007, reporter Brett Blackledge won the Pulitzer Prize for Investigative Reporting for his series of articles exposing corruption in Alabama's two-year college system.

In 2018, columnist John Archibald won the Pulitzer Prize for Commentary for his columns about former governor Robert J. Bentley, former Alabama Chief Justice Roy Moore and corruption in state politics.

In 2023, the newspaper won two Pulitzer Prizes. John Archibald, Ashley Remkus, Ramsey Archibald, and Challen Stephens won the 2023 Pulitzer Prize for Local Reporting for a series on a scandal in Brookside, Alabama where police officers had engaged on a rampant campaign of fining and towing motorists to corruptly keep the proceeds on fabricated charges. The team included a father-son duo in the two Archibalds. Kyle Whitmire won the Pulitzer Prize for Commentary for a series called "State of Denial" on the legacy of the Confederacy in Alabama, and how it harmed and stunted the state.

== Notable staff ==
- Jeanne Appleton Voltz

== See also ==
- List of newspapers in Alabama
