= Oscar Underwood =

American politician (1862–1929)

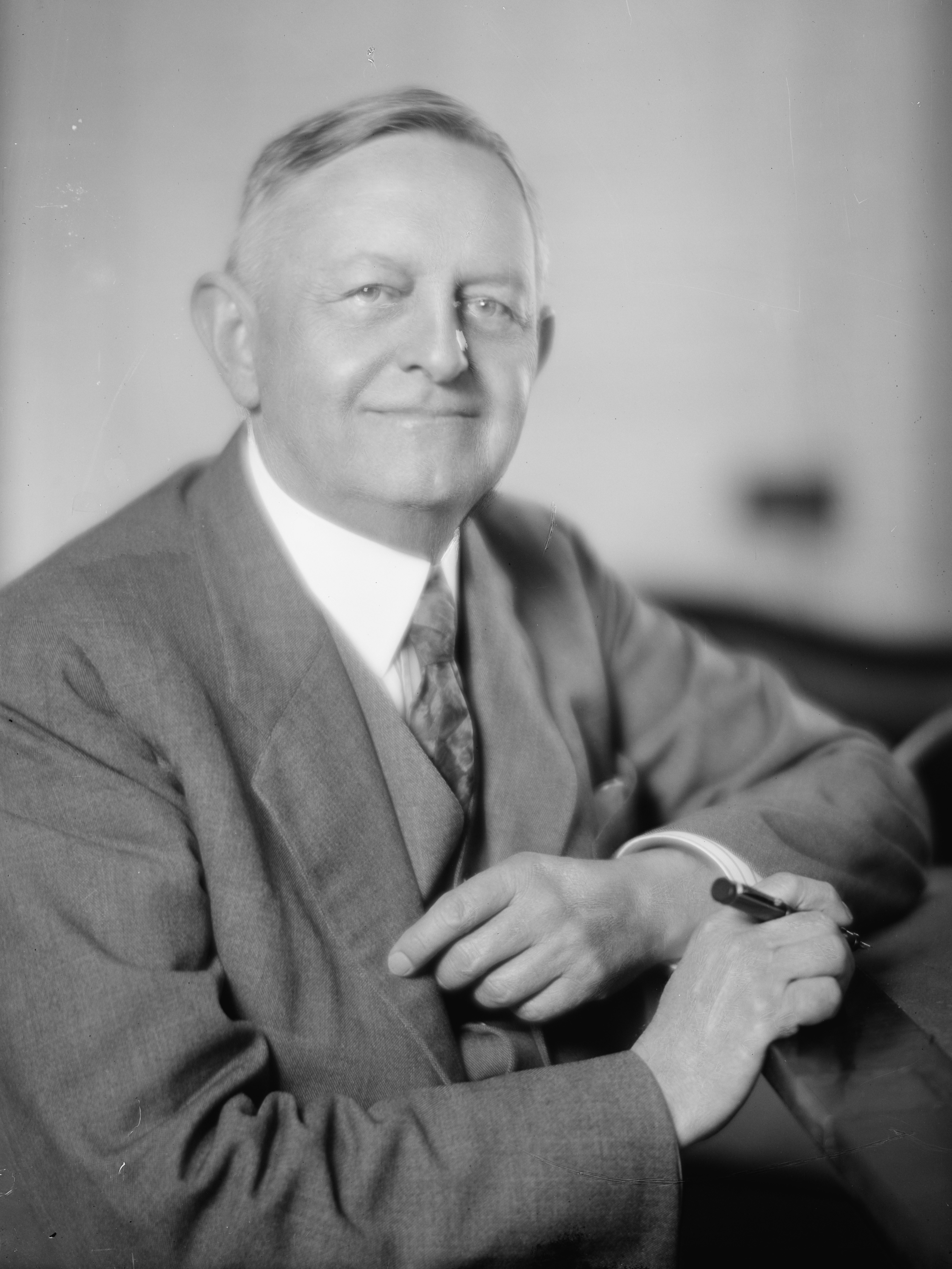
- Portrait by Harris & Ewing c. 1920s

United States Senator from Alabama
- In office March 4, 1915 – March 3, 1927
- Preceded by: Francis S. White
- Succeeded by: Hugo Black
Senate positions
Senate Minority Leader
In office April 27, 1920 – December 3, 1923
Deputy	Peter G. Gerry
Preceded by	Office established
Succeeded by	Joseph Taylor Robinson
Chairman of the Senate Democratic Caucus
In office April 27, 1920 – December 3, 1923
Preceded by	Gilbert Hitchcock (acting)
Succeeded by	Joseph Taylor Robinson

Member of the U.S. House of Representatives from Alabama's 9th district
- In office March 4, 1897 – March 3, 1915
- Preceded by: Truman H. Aldrich
- Succeeded by: George Huddleston
- In office March 4, 1895 – June 9, 1896
- Preceded by: Louis W. Turpin
- Succeeded by: Truman H. Aldrich
House positions
House Majority Leader
In office March 4, 1911 – March 3, 1915
Preceded by	Sereno E. Payne
Succeeded by	Claude Kitchin
Chair of the House Ways and Means Committee
In office March 4, 1911 – March 4, 1915
Preceded by	Sereno E. Payne
Succeeded by	Claude Kitchin
House Minority Whip
In office March 4, 1899 – March 3, 1901
Leader	James D. Richardson
Preceded by	Office established
Succeeded by	James T. Lloyd

Personal details
- Born: Oscar Wilder Underwood; May 6, 1862 Louisville, Kentucky, U.S.
- Died: January 25, 1929 (aged 66) Accotink, Virginia, U.S.
- Party: Democratic
- Spouses: Eugenia Massie (m. 1885; died 1900) Bertha Woodward (m. 1904)
- Education: University of Virginia, Charlottesville

Oscar Wilder Underwood (May 6, 1862 – January 25, 1929) was an American lawyer and politician from Alabama, and also a candidate for President of the United States in 1912 and 1924. He was the first formally designated floor leader in the United States Senate, and the only individual to serve as the Democratic leader in both the Senate and the United States House of Representatives.

Born in Louisville, Kentucky, Underwood began a legal career in Minnesota after graduating from the University of Virginia. He moved his legal practice to Birmingham, Alabama, in 1884 and won election to the House of Representatives in 1894. Underwood served as House Majority Leader from 1911 to 1915, and was a strong supporter of President Woodrow Wilson's progressive agenda and a prominent advocate of a reduction in the tariff. He sponsored the Revenue Act of 1913, also known as the Underwood Tariff, which lowered tariff rates and imposed a federal income tax. He won election to the Senate in 1914 and served as Senate Minority Leader from 1920 to 1923. He unsuccessfully opposed federal Prohibition, arguing that state and local governments should regulate alcohol.

Underwood sought the presidential nomination at the 1912 Democratic National Convention, but the convention selected Woodrow Wilson after forty-six ballots. He declined the vice presidential nomination, which instead went to Thomas R. Marshall. Underwood ran for president again in 1924, entering the 1924 Democratic National Convention as a prominent conservative opponent of the Ku Klux Klan. One of the few prominent anti-Klan politicians in the South at the time, Underwood and his supporters narrowly failed to win adoption of a Democratic resolution condemning the Klan. He experienced a boomlet of support on the 101st presidential ballot of the convention, but the Democrats nominated John W. Davis as a compromise candidate. Underwood declined to run for re-election in 1926 and retired to his Woodlawn plantation in Fairfax County, Virginia, where he died in 1929.

== Early and family life ==
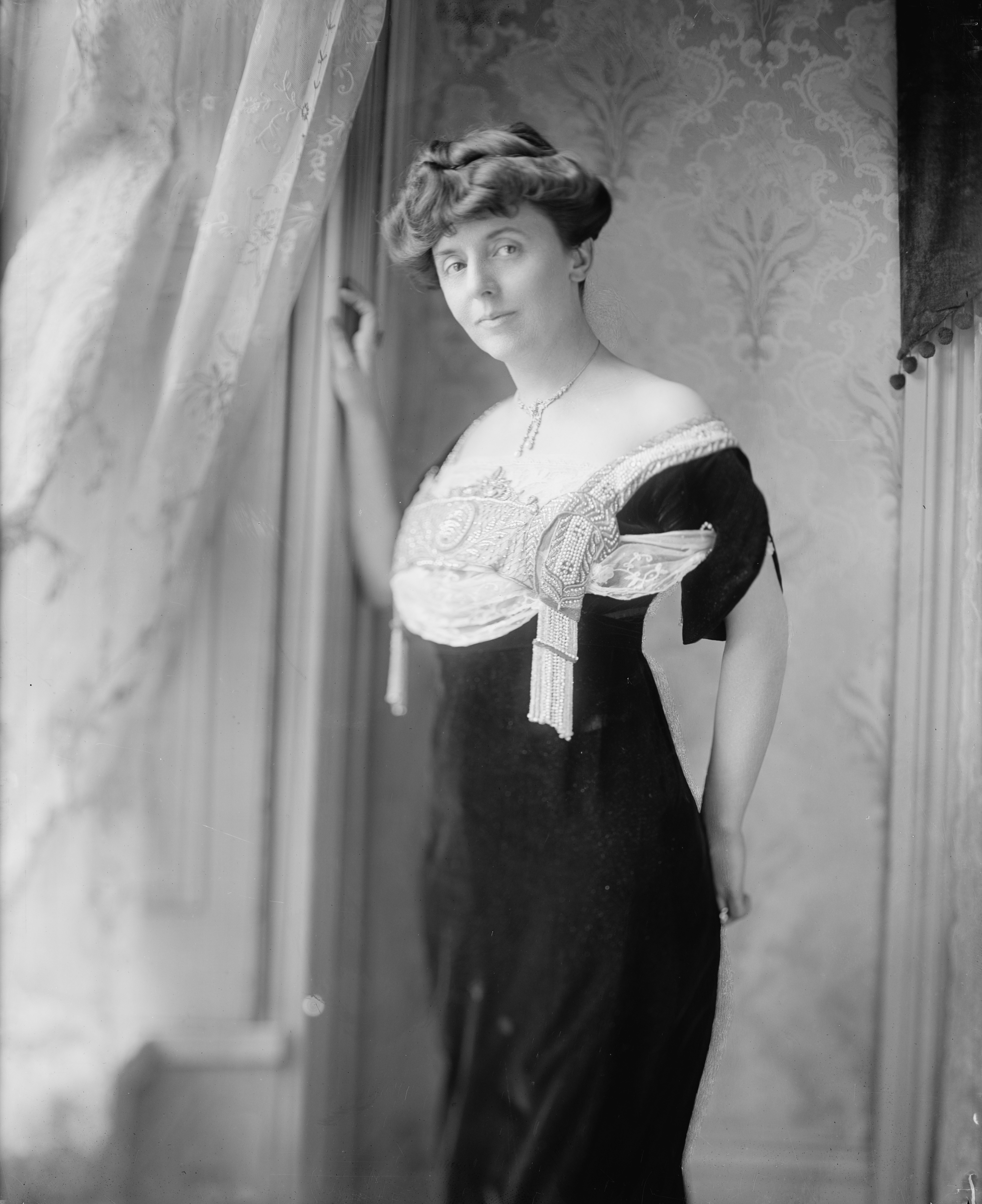
Portrait of Underwood's second wife Bertha by Harris & Ewing c. 1910s

Underwood was born in Louisville, Kentucky, on May 6, 1862, the eldest of three sons of lawyer and planter Eugene Underwood and his second wife, Frederica Virginia Wilder. Eugene Underwood also had three sons with his first wife before her death in 1857. His paternal grandfather, Joseph R. Underwood, served as U.S. Representative and Senator from Kentucky, as well as on the Kentucky Supreme Court. His maternal grandfather, cotton merchant Jabez Smith, once served as mayor of Petersburg, Virginia.

In 1865, the Underwood family moved to St. Paul, Minnesota, hoping the climate would help Oscar's chronic bronchitis, as well as his mother's health. After ten years, the family moved back to Louisville, where Oscar graduated from the Rugby University School, an exclusive private school, in 1879. He then attended the University of Virginia at Charlottesville, where he was president of the Jefferson Society, as well as excelled in debate. He also received the honorary degree of LL.D. from Columbia University in 1912 and Harvard University in 1922. He served as president of the University of Virginia Alumni Association in 1913 and 1914.

Oscar Underwood married twice, the first time in Charlottesville on October 8, 1885, to Eugenia Massie, daughter of Dr. Thomas Eugene Massie. They had two sons before she died in 1900: John Lewis Underwood (1888–1973) and Oscar Wilder Underwood Jr. (1890–1962). Underwood remarried on September 10, 1904, to Bertha Woodward (1870–1948), daughter of Union Army veteran Joseph Hershey Woodward (1843–1917) of the Woodward Iron Company and his wife Martha Burt (both of Ohio County in what became West Virginia), who survived him.

== Career ==
After graduation, Underwood returned to Minnesota to begin his legal career. However, his older half brother William soon convinced him of better opportunities awaiting in Birmingham, Alabama. There, he moved in September 1884 and established a successful legal practice, working for a decade, including with James J. Garrett.

== Political career ==
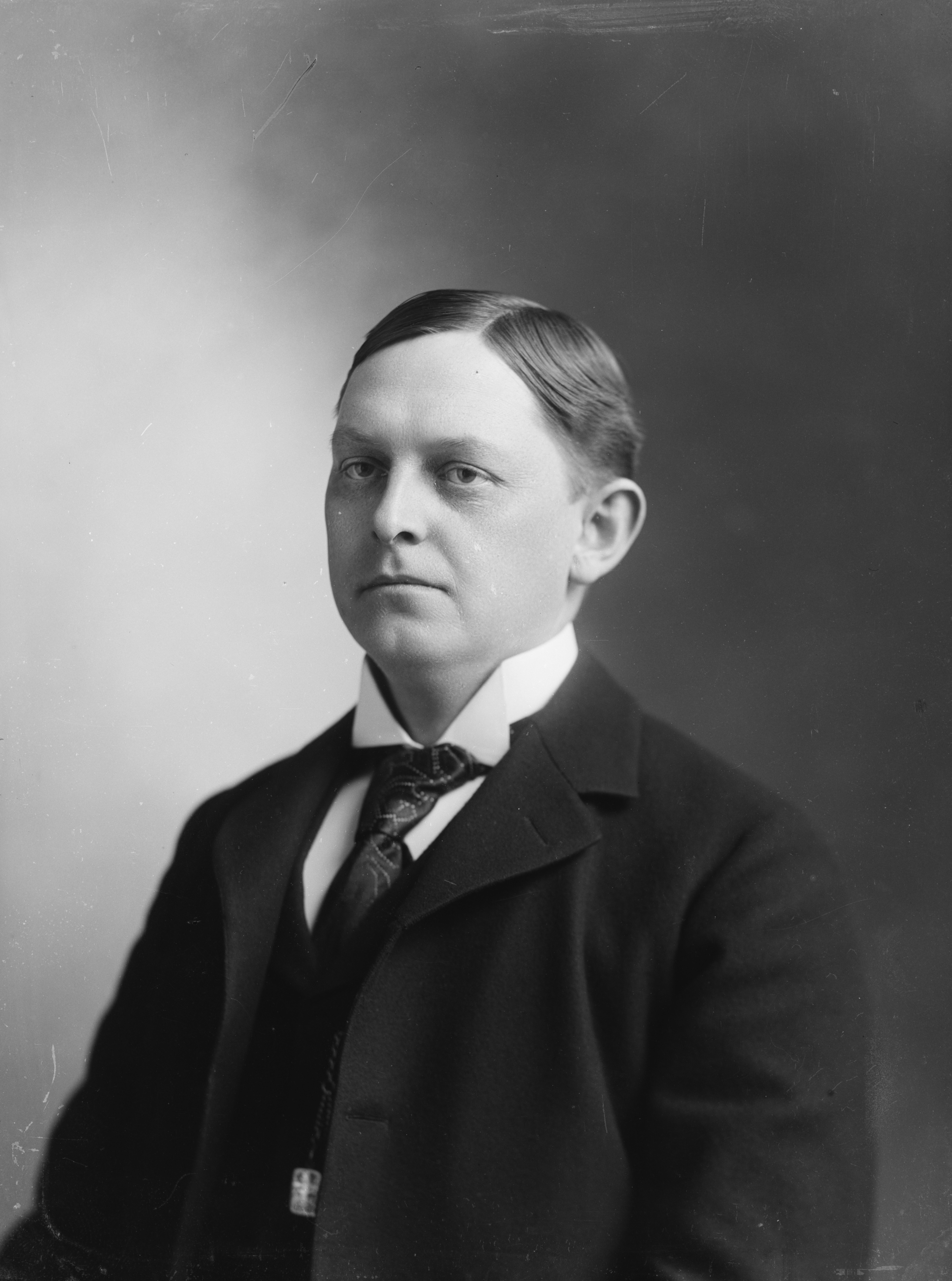
Portrait by C. M. Bell c. 1895–1901

Alabama earned an additional seat after the census of 1890, and Underwood became chairman of the new 9th District's Democratic Committee in 1892. Two years later, voters elected him as a Democrat to the United States House of Representatives. However, Truman H. Aldrich successfully challenged that election result, forcing Underwood to resign in the middle of the term, on June 9, 1896.

However, Underwood persisted, and campaigned for tariff reform. He won the seat again in the election at year's end, then re-election numerous times, serving nine terms (from 1897 to 1915). Underwood became as the first Democratic House Minority Whip, serving from about 1900 to 1901. He then became House Majority Leader from 1911 to 1915.

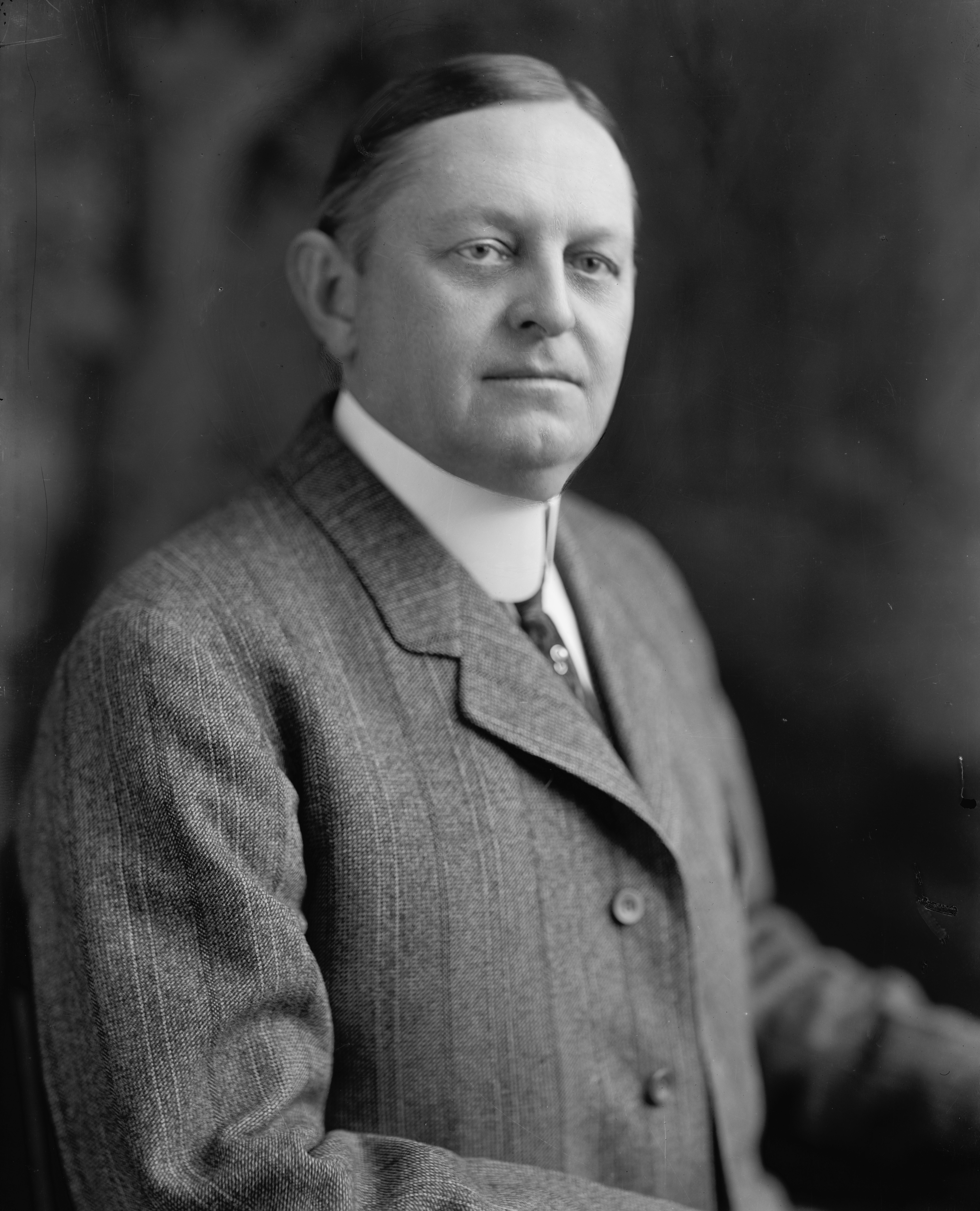
Portrait by Harris & Ewing c. 1910s

He was a candidate for the Democratic presidential nomination in 1912 and had some strength at the national convention among southern delegates but could not compete with Champ Clark and Woodrow Wilson. At the convention that year in Baltimore, Wilson's managers offered Underwood the vice-presidential nomination, which he declined. Following the election, Underwood supported the progressive reforms of Wilson's first term, using his position as Chairman of the House Ways and Means Committee to manage legislation and maintain party discipline. In return, Wilson granted him considerable control over patronage and appointed Albert S. Burleson Postmaster-General upon Underwood's recommendation. The Revenue Act of 1913 is also known as the Underwood Tariff Act or Underwood-Simmons Act in recognition of Underwood's role in writing and managing the bill as Chairman of the House Ways and Means Committee. He stood with a small minority of House members in opposition to the President when he voted to maintain an exemption from Panama Canal tolls for American ships traveling between American ports, despite British protests that the policy violated the Hay–Pauncefote Treaty.

Underwood twice won election to the United States Senate, in 1914 and 1920, and served there from March 4, 1915, to March 3, 1927. He was Senate minority leader from 1920 to 1923. Underwood was part of the four-person American delegation at the 1921-22 Washington Naval Conference. There, he helped negotiate the Five-Power Treaty limiting American, British, Japanese, French, and Italian naval armament.

He opposed federal Prohibition as "an attempt to rob the states of their jurisdiction over police matters" and advocated local control of liquor regulation because "the improved conditions which we may naturally expect to find in the lives of the men and women who practice Temperance are not found to predominate in the state where Prohibition laws have been on the statute books for years as compared to those states where liquor is sold under a license system or where Temperance laws are controlled by the sentiment of the local communities."

Underwood led the anti-Ku Klux Klan forces at the 1924 Democratic National Convention. He was a longtime opponent of the Klan. In 1924, when the Klan organized a parade in Birmingham during that year's Democratic National Convention, Underwood called it an effort "to intimidate me, the Alabama delegation and the Democratic Party....It will not succeed....I maintain that the organization is a national menace....It is either the Ku Klux Klan or the United States of America. Both cannot survive. Between the two, I choose my country." By 1924 Underwood was one of very few anti-Klan officeholders left in the South.

He blamed the Klan's opposition to his candidacy for his loss in the Georgia presidential primary to former Secretary of the Treasury William Gibbs McAdoo. He then determined to embarrass McAdoo by putting the party on record against the Klan. Even before the Convention considered its platform, the speech nominating Underwood called for the condemnation of the Klan and produced a lengthy floor demonstration. The attempt to modify the platform to condemn the Klan by name produced rousing demonstrations and speeches, many, including that of William Jennings Bryan, interrupted by the anti-Klan crowds that filled the galleries. The convention's final vote, though contested, defeated the minority proposal naming the Klan by a vote of 542 3/20 to 541 3/20. The fight proved a polarizing battle that made each of the convention's two major candidates unacceptable to large segments of the party, without enhancing Underwood's chances in the least.

The convention was marked by a deadlock between the supporters of the Irish Catholic New York Governor Al Smith and McAdoo, while the convention's rules required a two-thirds vote to secure the nomination. Several delegations declined to support either of the leading candidates and persisted in voting for their state's "favorite son" instead. Like the other favorite son candidates, Underwood resisted efforts to remove the convention's two-thirds rule. As the Convention labored through 103 ballots, Alabama, as the first state alphabetically, cast its votes first. The delegation's leader, Governor William W. Brandon, reported the state's unanimous vote tally each time without variation: "Alabama casts 24 votes for Oscar W. Underwood." Underwood became a symbol of the convention's deadlock. His vote totals were meager, fewer than 50, until the deadlock broke and on the 101st ballot he won 229.5, but his anti-prohibition, anti-Klan stances made him a most unlikely compromise candidate and the Convention turned to John W. Davis of West Virginia, whose work as a Wall Street lawyer proved less of a political hurdle for the delegates.

Underwood declined to run for reelection to the Senate in 1926. His anti-Klan stance had upset some in his own party and as well as from the Klan, and Hugo Black was a formidable candidate.

In 1927, Underwood was appointed to an international peace commission. In 1928, Underwood supported New York Governor Al Smith for president.

== Later life ==
In retirement, he and his second wife lived at Woodlawn plantation, a historic house associated with George Washington near Alexandria, Virginia. There, Underwood wrote his only published book, an analysis of the transformation of American government in the 20th century, Drifting Sands of Party Politics, which appeared in 1928. He decried federal legislation aimed at regulating morality, government by commissions, and excessive American engagement in foreign affairs.

== Death and legacy ==
Underwood suffered two disabling strokes in the winter of 1928–29. He died on January 25, 1929, at Woodlawn plantation. Pursuant to his wishes, his corpse was returned to Alabama, and buried beside his first wife in Birmingham's Elmwood Cemetery. His second wife was later buried with him, as was his son John Lewis Underwood (1888–1973). His son Oscar Wilder Underwood Jr. (1890–1962), who served with distinction as a U.S. Army Captain in World War I, later became a law professor at the University of Virginia.

Most of Underwood's papers are held by the Alabama Department of Archives and History, with some made available free online. Some of the family's papers are also held by his alma mater, the University of Virginia.

For Underwood's stand against the Klan, future President John F. Kennedy mentioned Underwood in his book Profiles in Courage, and the TV series of the same name, based on the book, featured Underwood in its first episode.

Underwood's former home in Washington, D.C., the Oscar W. Underwood House, was designated a National Historic Landmark in 1976. Woodlawn plantation was named to the National Register of Historic Places in 1970, and designated a national landmark in 1998. In 1990, Underwood was inducted into the Alabama Men's Hall of Fame.

== Sources ==
- United States Congress. "Oscar Underwood (id: U000013)". Biographical Directory of the United States Congress.
- James S. Fleming, "Oscar W. Underwood: The First Modern House Leader, 1911–1915," in Raymond W Smock and Susan W Hammond, eds. Masters of the House: Congressional Leadership Over Two Centuries (1998), 91–118
- James S. Fleming, "Re-establishing Leadership in the House of Representatives: The Case of Oscar W. Underwood," in Joel H. Silbey, The United States Congress in a Nation Transformed, 1896–1963, vol. 1 (Carlson, 1991), 235–252
- Evans C. Johnson. Oscar W. Underwood: A Political Biography (Louisiana State University Press, 1980).
- Robert K. Murray, The 103rd Ballot: Democrats and the Disaster in Madison Square Garden (NY: Harper & Row, 1976)

U.S. House of Representatives
Preceded by Louis W. Turpin	Member from Alabama's 2nd congressional district 1895–1896	Succeeded by Truman H. Aldrich
Preceded by Truman H. Aldrich	Member from Alabama's 9th congressional district 1897–1915	Succeeded by George Huddleston
New office	House Minority Whip; 1899–1901	Succeeded by James T. Lloyd
Preceded by Sereno E. Payne	House Majority Leader; 1911–1915	Succeeded by Claude Kitchin
Preceded by Sereno E. Payne	Chair of the House Ways and Means Committee; 1911–1915	Succeeded by Claude Kitchin
Party political offices
New office	House Democratic Deputy Leader; 1899–1901	Succeeded by James T. Lloyd
Vacant Title last held by James T. Lloyd	House Democratic Deputy Leader; 1911–1915	Vacant Title next held by William Allan Oldfield
Preceded by Francis S. White	Democratic nominee for U.S. Senator from Alabama (Class 3); 1914, 1920	Succeeded by Hugo Black
Preceded by Gilbert Hitchcock as Acting Chair of the Senate Democratic Caucus	Senate Democratic Leader; 1920–1923	Succeeded by Joseph T. Robinson
U.S. Senate
Preceded by Francis S. White	U.S. Senator (Class 3) from Alabama; 1915–1927; Served alongside: John H. Bankhead, B. B. Comer, J. Thomas Heflin	Succeeded by Hugo Black
Preceded by Joseph L. Bristow	Chair of the Senate Cuban Relations Committee; 1916–1919	Succeeded by Hiram Johnson
New office	Senate Minority Leader; 1920–1923	Succeeded by Joseph T. Robinson
