= Rufus N. Rhodes =

American journalist

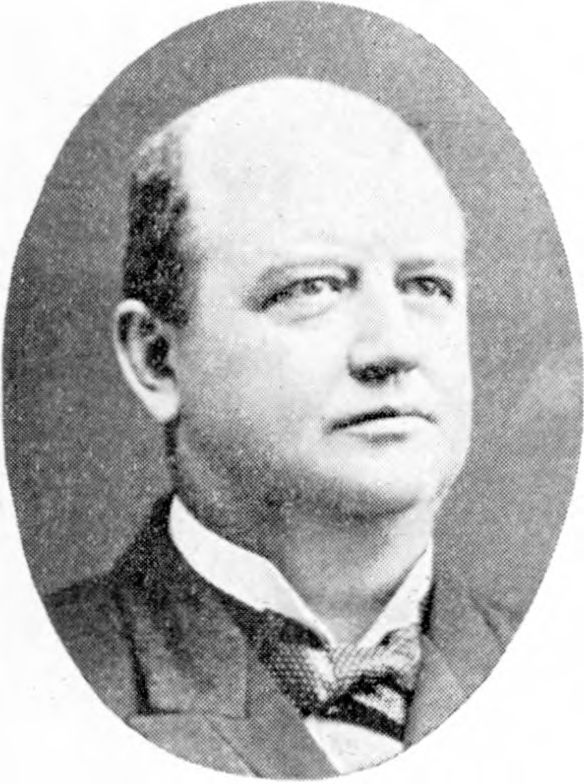
Rufus Napoleon Rhodes

Rufus Napoleon Rhodes (June 5, 1856– January 12, 1910) was the founder, publisher, and managing editor of the Birmingham News in Alabama from 1888 until his death.

== Early life and education ==
Rhodes was born in Mississippi. He was a lawyer by profession.

== Career ==
Rhodes practiced law in Clarksville, Tennessee, for four years. For a time, he was a private secretary to United States Senator James E. Bailey of Tennessee, and served for one term in the Tennessee House of Representatives. He later practiced law for four years in Chicago, Illinois.

He then moved to Birmingham, Alabama. Rhodes launched The Evening News, later renamed the Birmingham News, on March 14, 1888. He also served as a director of the Associated Press.

Rhodes was a delegate to the Democratic National Conventions of 1892 and 1904, and served as a brigadier general in the Alabama National Guard in 1898. He was the first editor to endorse Grover Cleveland as president.

== Death ==
He died in Birmingham, Alabama, and is buried in Birmingham's Elmwood Cemetery and Mausoleum.
