= Joseph F. Johnston =

Democratic governor of and U.S. Senator from Alabama

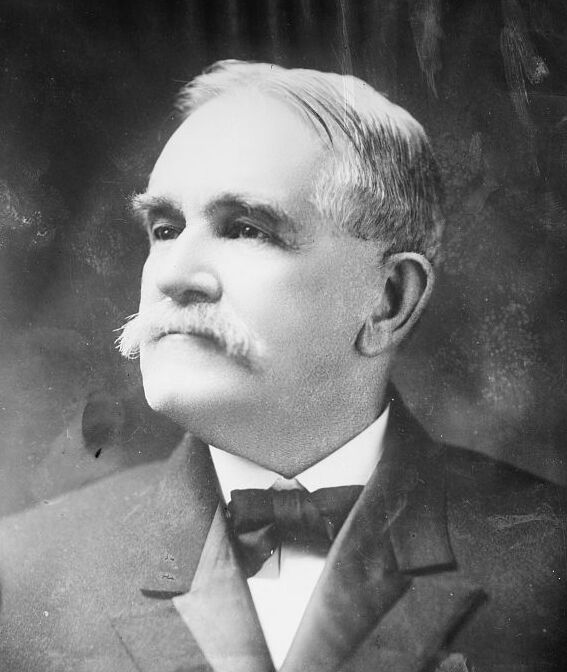

United States Senator from Alabama
- In office August 6, 1907 – August 8, 1913
- Preceded by: Edmund Pettus
- Succeeded by: Francis S. White

30th Governor of Alabama
- In office December 1, 1896 – December 1, 1900
- Preceded by: William C. Oates
- Succeeded by: William J. Samford

Personal details
- Born: March 23, 1843 Lincoln County, North Carolina, US
- Died: August 8, 1913 (aged 70) Washington, D.C., US
- Resting place: Elmwood Cemetery (Birmingham, Alabama)
- Party: Democratic
- Children: 3

Military service
- Allegiance: Confederate States of America
- Branch/service: Confederate States Army
- Rank: Captain
- Unit: 12th North Carolina Infantry
- Battles/wars: American Civil War

Joseph Forney Johnston (March 23, 1843 – August 8, 1913) was an American Democratic politician and businessman who was the 30th governor of Alabama from 1896 to 1900. He later served in the United States Senate from August 6, 1907, to his death on August 8, 1913. As a senator, he was chair of the U.S. Senate Committee to Establish a University of the United States.

== Biography ==
Born in Lincoln County, North Carolina, on March 23, 1843, Johnston attended the rural public schools in North Carolina during his youth. Johnston moved to Talladega, Alabama, at the age of seventeen and attended a military academy. At the outbreak of the American Civil War, Johnston enlisted as a private in the Confederate States Army. Johnston served through the duration of the war, receiving wounds at Chickamauga, Spotsylvania, New Market, and Petersburg. By the war's end, he attained the rank of captain.

After returning from the war, Johnston studied law under William H. Forney and was admitted to the bar. He practiced law in Selma, Alabama, eventually moving to Birmingham to become president of the Alabama National Bank. In 1887, Johnston became president of the Sloss Iron & Steel company, an industry thriving in Alabama.

Johnston first entered the political arena in 1890, when he ran for Alabama governor but lost to Thomas G. Jones. In 1896, he again ran for governor. He succeeded, serving two consecutive two-year terms as Governor of Alabama. Johnston's achievements during his tenure as governor include tax reform, creation of the Alabama Department of Insurance, and the establishment of a state mine inspector.

Johnston decided not to seek another term as governor in 1900 and challenged John Tyler Morgan in that year's Senate election. Morgan defeated Johnston, and in 1902, Johnston sought a third term as governor against incumbent William D. Jelks. The revelation of several scandals involving Sloss Iron & Steel and misconduct in the prison system hurt Johnston, and he would ultimately lose the election.

However, Johnston attained political office again by being elected to complete Senator Edmund Pettus's term after Pettus had died in office in 1907. Johnston was re-elected in 1909 and served in the Senate until his death from pneumonia in 1913.

Johnston was married to Theresa Virginia Hooper of South Carolina. They had three children, including Birmingham attorney and civic leader Forney Johnston. He is buried in Birmingham's Elmwood Cemetery.

== See also ==
- List of members of the United States Congress who died in office (1900–1949)

Party political offices
Preceded by William C. Oates	Democratic nominee for Governor of Alabama; 1896, 1898	Succeeded by William J. Samford
Political offices
Preceded by William C. Oates	Governor of Alabama; 1896–1900	Succeeded by William J. Samford
U.S. Senate
Preceded by Edmund Pettus	U.S. Senator from Alabama; 1907–1913	Succeeded by Francis S. White
