= List of governors of Alabama =

The governor of Alabama is the chief executive officer and commander in chief of the national guard of the U.S. state of Alabama. The governor is the head of the executive branch of Alabama's state government and is charged with enforcing state laws.

There have officially been 54 governors of the state of Alabama; this official numbering skips acting and military governors. The first governor, William W. Bibb, served as the only governor of the Alabama Territory. Five people have served as acting governor, bringing the total number of people serving as governor to 59, spread over 63 distinct terms. Four governors have served multiple non-consecutive terms: Bibb Graves, Jim Folsom, and Fob James each served two, and George Wallace served three non-consecutive periods. Officially, these non-consecutive terms are numbered only with the number of their first term. William D. Jelks also served non-consecutive terms, but his first term was in an acting capacity.

The longest-serving governor was George Wallace, who served 16 years over four terms. The shortest term for a non-acting governor was that of Hugh McVay, who served four and a half months after replacing the resigning Clement Comer Clay. Lurleen Wallace, the first wife of George Wallace, was the first woman to serve as governor of Alabama, and the third woman to serve as governor of any state. The current governor is Republican Kay Ivey.

== Governors ==
=== Territory of Alabama ===
Alabama Territory was formed on March 3, 1817, from Mississippi Territory. It had only one governor appointed by the President of the United States before it became a state; he became the first state governor.

Governor of the Territory of Alabama
Governor	Term in office	Appointed by
William W. Bibb (1781–1820)	September 25, 1817 (Note: Bibb was appointed on September 25, 1817, during a Senate recess; nominated on December 12; and confirmed by the Senate on December 15.) – November 9, 1819 (776 days; elected state governor)	James Monroe

=== State of Alabama ===
Seal for use by the governor-elect

Governor's flag before 1939

Alabama was admitted to the Union on December 14, 1819. It seceded from the Union on January 11, 1861, and was a founding member of the Confederate States of America on February 8, 1861. Following the end of the American Civil War, Alabama during Reconstruction was part of the Third Military District, which exerted some control over governor appointments and elections. Alabama was readmitted to the Union on July 14, 1868.

The first Alabama Constitution, ratified in 1819, provided that a governor be elected every two years, limited to serve no more than 4 out of every 6 years. This limit remained in place until the constitution of 1868, which simply allowed governors to serve terms of two years. The current constitution of 1901 increased terms to four years, but prohibited governors from succeeding themselves. An amendment in 1968 allowed governors to succeed themselves once; a governor serving two consecutive terms can run again after waiting out the next term. The constitution had no set date for the commencement of a governor's term until 1901, when it was set at the first Monday after the second Tuesday in the January following an election. However, the Alabama Supreme Court ruled in 1911 that a governor's term ends at midnight at the end of Monday, and the next governor's term begins the next day, regardless of if they were sworn in on Monday.

The office of lieutenant governor was created in 1868, abolished in 1875, and recreated in 1901. According to the current constitution, should the governor be out of the state for more than 20 days, the lieutenant governor becomes acting governor, and if the office of governor becomes vacant the lieutenant governor ascends to the governorship. The governor and the lieutenant governor are elected at the same time but not on the same ticket.

Alabama was a strongly Democratic state before the Civil War, electing only candidates from the Democratic-Republican and Democratic parties. It had two Republican governors following Reconstruction, but after the Democratic Party re-established control, 112 years passed before voters chose another Republican. Since 2002, the state has continuously elected Republicans to the governorship.

Governors of the State of Alabama
No.	Governor	Term in office	Party	Election	Lt. Governor (Note: The office of lieutenant governor was created in 1868, abolished in 1875, and recreated in 1901.) (Note: Lieutenant governors represented the same party as their governor unless noted.)
1	William W. Bibb (1781–1820)	November 9, 1819 – July 10, 1820 (245 days; died in office)	Democratic- Republican	1819	Office did not exist
2	Thomas Bibb (1783–1839)	July 10, 1820 (Note: William Wyatt Bibb died on July 10, 1820. Multiple sources state that Thomas Bibb did not succeed him until either July 15 or July 25. It is unknown if this was the formal inauguration, or if a vacancy existed in the office; it is assumed that succession was automatic, as per the constitution, and that Thomas Bibb's term began on July 10.) – November 9, 1821 (488 days; retired)	Democratic- Republican	Succeeded from president of the Senate	Office did not exist
3	Israel Pickens (1780–1827)	November 9, 1821 – November 25, 1825 (1478 days; term-limited) (Note: Under the 1819 constitution, governors were limited to no more than four years out of every term of six years.)	Democratic- Republican	1821	Office did not exist
3	Israel Pickens (1780–1827)	November 9, 1821 – November 25, 1825 (1478 days; term-limited)	Democratic- Republican	1823	Office did not exist
4	John Murphy (d. 1841)	November 25, 1825 – November 21, 1829 (1458 days; term-limited)	Jackson; Democrat	1825	Office did not exist
4	John Murphy (d. 1841)	November 25, 1825 – November 21, 1829 (1458 days; term-limited)	Jackson; Democrat	1827	Office did not exist
5	Gabriel Moore (1785–1844)	November 21, 1829 – March 3, 1831 (468 days; resigned) (Note: Moore resigned, having been elected to the United States Senate.)	Jackson; Democrat	1829	Office did not exist
6	Samuel B. Moore (1789–1846)	March 3, 1831 – November 26, 1831 (269 days; lost election)	Jackson; Democrat	Succeeded from president of the Senate	Office did not exist
7	John Gayle (1792–1859)	November 26, 1831 – November 21, 1835 (1457 days; term-limited)	Jackson; Democrat	1831	Office did not exist
7	John Gayle (1792–1859)	November 26, 1831 – November 21, 1835 (1457 days; term-limited)	Democratic	1833	Office did not exist
8	Clement Comer Clay (1789–1866)	November 21, 1835 – July 17, 1837 (Note: Sources disagree on the exact date McVay succeeded Clay, with the Alabama Department of Archives and History and National Governors Association mentioning both July 16, 1837, and July 17, though July 17 is used more prominently. However, the earliest contemporary news report of Clay's resignation is August 6. Clay did not take office in the Senate until September 4.) (605 days; resigned) (Note: Clay resigned, having been elected to the United States Senate.)	Democratic	1835	Office did not exist
9	Hugh McVay (1766–1851)	July 17, 1837 – November 21, 1837 (128 days; retired)	Democratic	Succeeded from president of the Senate	Office did not exist
10	Arthur P. Bagby (1794–1858)	November 21, 1837 – November 22, 1841 (1463 days; term-limited) (Note: Bagby, being term-limited, was elected to the United States Senate two days after finishing his term.)	Democratic	1837	Office did not exist
10	Arthur P. Bagby (1794–1858)	November 21, 1837 – November 22, 1841 (1463 days; term-limited)	Democratic	1839	Office did not exist
11	Benjamin Fitzpatrick (1802–1869)	November 22, 1841 – December 9, 1845 (1479 days; term-limited)	Democratic	1841	Office did not exist
11	Benjamin Fitzpatrick (1802–1869)	November 22, 1841 – December 9, 1845 (1479 days; term-limited)	Democratic	1843	Office did not exist
12	Joshua L. Martin (1799–1856)	December 9, 1845 – December 16, 1847 (738 days; retired) (Note: One contemporary source states Martin withdrew in the final days of the election, but the major sources state he simply did not run.)	Independent (Note: Sources sometimes label Martin as an "Independent Democrat".)	1845	Office did not exist
13	Reuben Chapman (1799–1882)	December 16, 1847 – December 17, 1849 (733 days; lost nomination)	Democratic	1847	Office did not exist
14	Henry W. Collier (1801–1855)	December 17, 1849 – December 20, 1853 (1465 days; term-limited)	Democratic	1849	Office did not exist
14	Henry W. Collier (1801–1855)	December 17, 1849 – December 20, 1853 (1465 days; term-limited)	Democratic	1851	Office did not exist
15	John A. Winston (1812–1871)	December 20, 1853 – December 1, 1857 (1443 days; term-limited)	Democratic	1853	Office did not exist
15	John A. Winston (1812–1871)	December 20, 1853 – December 1, 1857 (1443 days; term-limited)	Democratic	1855	Office did not exist
16	Andrew B. Moore (1807–1873)	December 1, 1857 – December 2, 1861 (1463 days; term-limited)	Democratic	1857	Office did not exist
16	Andrew B. Moore (1807–1873)	December 1, 1857 – December 2, 1861 (1463 days; term-limited)	Democratic	1859	Office did not exist
17	John Gill Shorter (1818–1872)	December 2, 1861 – December 1, 1863 (730 days; lost election)	Democratic	1861	Office did not exist
18	Thomas H. Watts (1819–1892)	December 1, 1863 – May 3, 1865 (Note: Modern sources disagree on when Watts was removed and arrested, but contemporary news sources report he was arrested on May 3, 1865.) (520 days; arrested and removed) (Note: Watts was arrested by Union forces soon after the American Civil War ended; he was released a few weeks later.)	Whig	1863	Office did not exist
—	Vacant	May 3, 1865 – June 21, 1865 (50 days)	Office vacated after civil war		Office did not exist
19	Lewis E. Parsons (1817–1895)	June 21, 1865 – December 13, 1865 (176 days; retired)	Provisional governor appointed by President		Office did not exist
20	Robert M. Patton (1809–1885)	December 13, 1865 – July 14, 1868 (Note: Sources, even contemporary reporting, disagree on when Smith succeeded Patton. Modern sources tend to say Patton left office on July 24, 1868, but older sources place it on July 12, July 13, or July 14. The journal of the Alabama Senate placed it on July 14.) (945 days; retired)	Non-partisan (Note: The 1865 election was non-partisan; politically, Patton was a Whig.)	1865	Office did not exist
—	Wager Swayne (1834–1902)	March 2, 1867 (Note: The date given for Swayne is the date of the first Reconstruction Act, which placed Alabama into the Third Military District; all references only say "March 1867" and when the Reconstruction Acts were passed.) – January 11, 1868 (316 days; removed) (Note: In December 1867, President Andrew Johnson ordered the removal of Major General Swayne. He was replaced on January 11, 1868, by Major General Julius Hayden.)	Military occupation (Note: The United States Congress stripped Patton of most of his authority in March 1867, after which time the state was effectively under the control of Major General Swayne.)		Office did not exist
21	William Hugh Smith (1826–1899)	July 14, 1868 – November 26, 1870 (Note: Lindsay was sworn into office on November 26, 1870, but Smith refused to leave his seat for two weeks, claiming Lindsay was fraudulently elected; he finally left office on December 8, when a court so ordered.) (866 days; lost election)	Republican	1868	Andrew J. Applegate (Note: The date of Applegate's inauguration is more ambiguous than Smith's, as the Senate journal doesn't even record when he was sworn in; it is possible he was sworn in on July 13.) (died August 21, 1870)
21	William Hugh Smith (1826–1899)	July 14, 1868 – November 26, 1870 (866 days; lost election)	Republican	1868	Vacant
22	Robert B. Lindsay (1824–1902)	November 26, 1870 – November 25, 1872 (731 days; retired)	Democratic	1870	Edward H. Moren
23	David P. Lewis (1820–1884)	November 25, 1872 – November 24, 1874 (730 days; lost election)	Republican	1872	Alexander McKinstry
24	George S. Houston (1811–1879)	November 24, 1874 – November 27, 1878 (1465 days; retired) (Note: Houston was instead elected to the United States Senate.)	Democratic	1874	Robert F. Ligon
24	George S. Houston (1811–1879)	November 24, 1874 – November 27, 1878 (1465 days; retired)	Democratic	1876	Office did not exist
25	Rufus W. Cobb (1829–1913)	November 27, 1878 – December 1, 1882 (1466 days; retired)	Democratic	1878	Office did not exist
25	Rufus W. Cobb (1829–1913)	November 27, 1878 – December 1, 1882 (1466 days; retired)	Democratic	1880	Office did not exist
26	Edward A. O'Neal (1818–1890)	December 1, 1882 – December 1, 1886 (1462 days; retired)	Democratic	1882	Office did not exist
26	Edward A. O'Neal (1818–1890)	December 1, 1882 – December 1, 1886 (1462 days; retired)	Democratic	1884	Office did not exist
27	Thomas Seay (1846–1896)	December 1, 1886 – December 1, 1890 (1462 days; retired) (Note: Seay instead ran unsuccessfully for the United States Senate.)	Democratic	1886	Office did not exist
27	Thomas Seay (1846–1896)	December 1, 1886 – December 1, 1890 (1462 days; retired)	Democratic	1888	Office did not exist
28	Thomas G. Jones (1844–1914)	December 1, 1890 – December 1, 1894 (1462 days; retired)	Democratic	1890	Office did not exist
28	Thomas G. Jones (1844–1914)	December 1, 1890 – December 1, 1894 (1462 days; retired)	Democratic	1892	Office did not exist
29	William C. Oates (1835–1910)	December 1, 1894 – December 1, 1896 (732 days; retired)	Democratic	1894	Office did not exist
30	Joseph F. Johnston (1843–1913)	December 1, 1896 – December 1, 1900 (1461 days; retired) (Note: Johnston instead ran unsuccessfully for the United States Senate.)	Democratic	1896	Office did not exist
30	Joseph F. Johnston (1843–1913)	December 1, 1896 – December 1, 1900 (1461 days; retired)	Democratic	1898	Office did not exist
—	William D. Jelks (1855–1931)	December 1, 1900 – December 26, 1900 (26 days; acting) (Note: Samford was ill at the start of his term on December 1, and was unable to perform his duties until December 26. President of the Senate Jelks acted as governor until he could take office, with the formal request for him to act as governor made on December 3.)	Democratic	President of the Senate acting	Office did not exist
31	William J. Samford (1844–1901)	December 1, 1900 – June 11, 1901 (193 days; died in office)	Democratic	1900	Office did not exist
32	William D. Jelks (1855–1931)	June 11, 1901 – January 14, 1907 (2044 days; term-limited) (Note: Under the 1901 constitution, governors were not eligible to succeed themselves.)	Democratic	Succeeded from president of the Senate	Office did not exist
32	William D. Jelks (1855–1931)	June 11, 1901 – January 14, 1907 (2044 days; term-limited)	Democratic	1902	Russell McWhortor Cunningham (acted as governor April 25, 1904–March 5, 1905) (Note: Jelks was out of state for medical treatment for nearly a year; Lieutenant Governor Cunningham acted as governor in his absence.)
33	B. B. Comer (1848–1927)	January 14, 1907 – January 16, 1911 (1464 days; term-limited)	Democratic	1906	Henry B. Gray
34	Emmet O'Neal (1853–1922)	January 17, 1911 (Note: The constitutional start date for 1911 was January 16, and that is when Emmet O'Neal was sworn in. However, the Supreme Court of Alabama ruled in the case of Oberhaus v. State ex rel. McNamara that, regardless of when the swearing in took place, B. B. Comer's term did not end until the end of Monday, and O'Neal's term did not begin until the first minute of the next day. This precedent appears to have quietly continued, as coverage of Robert J. Bentley's inauguration in 2011 noted he would not officially take office until midnight. Therefore, governors since 1911 that served to the end of their term are noted as leaving office on Monday, and their successor taking office on Tuesday.) – January 18, 1915 (1463 days; term-limited)	Democratic	1910	Walter D. Seed Sr.
35	Charles Henderson (1860–1937)	January 19, 1915 – January 20, 1919 (1463 days; term-limited)	Democratic	1914	Thomas Kilby
36	Thomas Kilby (1865–1943)	January 21, 1919 – January 15, 1923 (1456 days; term-limited)	Democratic	1918	Nathan Lee Miller
37	William W. Brandon (1868–1934)	January 16, 1923 – January 17, 1927 (1463 days; term-limited)	Democratic	1922	Charles S. McDowell (acted as governor July 10, 1924–July 11, 1924) (Note: Brandon was out of state for 21 days as a delegate to the 1924 Democratic National Convention; Lieutenant Governor McDowell acted as governor for two days.)
38	Bibb Graves (1873–1942)	January 18, 1927 – January 19, 1931 (1463 days; term-limited)	Democratic	1926	William C. Davis
39	Benjamin M. Miller (1864–1944)	January 20, 1931 – January 14, 1935 (1456 days; term-limited)	Democratic	1930	Hugh Davis Merrill
38	Bibb Graves (1873–1942)	January 15, 1935 – January 16, 1939 (1463 days; term-limited)	Democratic	1934	Thomas E. Knight Jr. (died May 17, 1937)
38	Bibb Graves (1873–1942)	January 15, 1935 – January 16, 1939 (1463 days; term-limited)	Democratic	1934	Vacant
40	Frank M. Dixon (1892–1965)	January 17, 1939 – January 18, 1943 (1463 days; term-limited)	Democratic	1938	Albert A. Carmichael
41	Chauncey Sparks (1884–1968)	January 19, 1943 – January 20, 1947 (1463 days; term-limited)	Democratic	1942	Leven H. Ellis
42	Jim Folsom (1908–1987)	January 21, 1947 – January 15, 1951 (1456 days; term-limited)	Democratic	1946	James C. Inzer
43	Gordon Persons (1902–1965)	January 16, 1951 – January 17, 1955 (1463 days; term-limited)	Democratic	1950	James Allen
42	Jim Folsom (1908–1987)	January 18, 1955 – January 19, 1959 (1463 days; term-limited)	Democratic	1954	William G. Hardwick
44	John M. Patterson (1921–2021)	January 20, 1959 – January 14, 1963 (1456 days; term-limited)	Democratic	1958	Albert Boutwell
45	George Wallace (1919–1998)	January 15, 1963 – January 16, 1967 (1463 days; term-limited)	Democratic	1962	James Allen
46	Lurleen Wallace (1926–1968)	January 17, 1967 – May 7, 1968 (477 days; died in office)	Democratic	1966	Albert Brewer (acted as governor July 25, 1967) (Note: Wallace was out of state for 20 days for medical treatment. Lieutenant Governor Brewer became acting governor on July 25, 1967, and Wallace returned to the state later that day.)
47	Albert Brewer (1928–2017)	May 7, 1968 – January 18, 1971 (987 days; lost nomination)	Democratic	Succeeded from lieutenant governor	Vacant
45	George Wallace (1919–1998)	January 19, 1971 – January 15, 1979 (2919 days; term-limited) (Note: Under a 1968 amendment to the constitution, governors are eligible to succeed themselves once.)	Democratic	1970	Jere Beasley (acted as governor June 5, 1972–July 7, 1972) (Note: Wallace was out of state for 52 days for medical treatment following an assassination attempt while campaigning for President of the United States; Lieutenant Governor Beasley acted as governor for 32 days.)
45	George Wallace (1919–1998)	January 19, 1971 – January 15, 1979 (2919 days; term-limited)	Democratic	1974	Jere Beasley (acted as governor June 5, 1972–July 7, 1972)
48	Fob James (b. 1934)	January 16, 1979 – January 17, 1983 (1463 days; retired)	Democratic	1978	George McMillan
45	George Wallace (1919–1998)	January 18, 1983 – January 19, 1987 (1463 days; retired)	Democratic	1982	Bill Baxley
49	H. Guy Hunt (1933–2009)	January 20, 1987 – April 22, 1993 (2285 days; removed) (Note: Hunt was convicted of illegally using campaign and inaugural funds to pay personal debts, a felony; as felons cannot serve as governor, he was removed from office, and Folsom became governor. He was later pardoned by the state parole board.)	Republican	1986	Jim Folsom Jr. (Note: Represented the Democratic Party)
49	H. Guy Hunt (1933–2009)	January 20, 1987 – April 22, 1993 (2285 days; removed)	Republican	1990	Jim Folsom Jr.
50	Jim Folsom Jr. (b. 1949)	April 22, 1993 – January 16, 1995 (635 days; lost election)	Democratic	Succeeded from lieutenant governor	Vacant
48	Fob James (b. 1934)	January 17, 1995 – January 18, 1999 (1463 days; lost election)	Republican	1994	Don Siegelman
51	Don Siegelman (b. 1946)	January 19, 1999 – January 20, 2003 (1463 days; lost election)	Democratic	1998	Steve Windom (Note: Represented the Republican Party)
52	Bob Riley (b. 1944)	January 21, 2003 – January 17, 2011 (2919 days; term-limited)	Republican	2002	Lucy Baxley
52	Bob Riley (b. 1944)	January 21, 2003 – January 17, 2011 (2919 days; term-limited)	Republican	2006	Jim Folsom Jr.
53	Robert J. Bentley (b. 1943)	January 18, 2011 – April 10, 2017 (2275 days; resigned) (Note: Bentley resigned from office as part of a plea deal involving campaign violations.)	Republican	2010	Kay Ivey
53	Robert J. Bentley (b. 1943)	January 18, 2011 – April 10, 2017 (2275 days; resigned)	Republican	2014	Kay Ivey
54	Kay Ivey (b. 1944)	April 10, 2017 – Incumbent (Note: Ivey's second full term began on January 16, 2023, and will expire on January 18, 2027; she is term-limited.) (in office 3513 days)	Republican	Succeeded from lieutenant governor	Vacant
54	Kay Ivey (b. 1944)	April 10, 2017 – Incumbent (in office 3513 days)	Republican	2018	Will Ainsworth
54	Kay Ivey (b. 1944)	April 10, 2017 – Incumbent (in office 3513 days)	Republican	2022	Will Ainsworth
55	Tommy Tuberville (b. 1954)	Governor-elect takes office January 18, 2027	Republican	2026	John Wahl

== Timeline ==
Timeline of Alabama governors

== Elections ==
Gubernatorial elections of the State of Alabama
Election date	Incumbent	Winner	Runner-up	Term start date	Term definitions		
Election date	Incumbent	Winner	Runner-up	Term start date	Length	Limit	Beginning
September 20–21 1819	new office (Note: William W. Bibb was the incumbent governor of Alabama Territory at the time of the election.)	William W. Bibb; Dem.-Rep., 53.8%	Marmaduke Williams; Unknown, 46.2%	November 9, 1819	1819 constitution		
September 20–21 1819	new office	William W. Bibb; Dem.-Rep., 53.8%	Marmaduke Williams; Unknown, 46.2%	November 9, 1819	Two years	Four out of six years	None (Note: No start date was specified in the constitution; the inauguration usually occurred within a week of the election's certification.)
August 6 1821	Thomas Bibb (Note: Thomas Bibb succeeded William W. Bibb upon his death on July 10, 1820.); Dem.-Rep., retiring	Israel Pickens; Dem.-Rep., 57.4%	Henry H. Chambers; Unknown, 42.6%	November 9, 1821	Two years	Four out of six years	None
August 4 1823	Israel Pickens; Dem.-Rep., running	Israel Pickens; Dem.-Rep., 60.1%	Henry H. Chambers; Unknown, 39.9%	November 24, 1823	Two years	Four out of six years	None
August 1 1825	Israel Pickens; Dem.-Rep., term-limited	John Murphy; Dem.-Rep., 100%	unopposed	November 25, 1825	Two years	Four out of six years	None
August 6 1827	John Murphy; Dem.-Rep., running	John Murphy; Dem.-Rep., 99.2%	unopposed	November 26, 1827	Two years	Four out of six years	None
August 3 1829	John Murphy; Dem.-Rep., term-limited	Gabriel Moore; Dem.-Rep., 100%	unopposed	November 21, 1829	Two years	Four out of six years	None
August 1 1831	Samuel B. Moore (Note: Samuel B. Moore succeeded Gabriel Moore upon his resignation on March 3, 1831.); Dem.-Rep., running	John Gayle; Dem.-Rep., 55.0%	Nicholas Davis; Nat. Rep., 31.1%	November 26, 1831	Two years	Four out of six years	None
August 5 1833	John Gayle; Dem., running	John Gayle; Dem., 100%	unopposed	November 28, 1833	Two years	Four out of six years	None
August 3 1835	John Gayle; Dem., term-limited	Clement Comer Clay; Dem., 65.6%	Enoch Parsons; Whig, 34.4%	November 21, 1835	Two years	Four out of six years	None
August 7 1837	Hugh McVay (Note: McVay succeeded Clay upon his resignation on July 17, 1837.); Dem., retiring	Arthur P. Bagby; Dem., 54.8%	Samuel W. Oliver; Anti-Van Buren Democrat, 45.2%	November 21, 1837	Two years	Four out of six years	None
August 3 1839	Arthur P. Bagby; Dem., running	Arthur P. Bagby; Dem., 92.3%	Arthur F. Hopkins; Whig, 7.7%	December 18, 1839	Two years	Four out of six years	None
August 2 1841	Arthur P. Bagby; Dem., term-limited	Benjamin Fitzpatrick; Dem., 56.9%	James White McClung; Whig, 43.1%	November 22, 1841	Two years	Four out of six years	None
August 7 1843	Benjamin Fitzpatrick; Dem., running	Benjamin Fitzpatrick; Dem., 100%	unopposed	December 8, 1843	Two years	Four out of six years	None
August 4 1845	Benjamin Fitzpatrick; Dem., term-limited	Joshua L. Martin; Ind., 53.5%	Nathaniel Terry; Dem., 45.3%	December 9, 1845	Two years	Four out of six years	None
August 2 1847	Joshua L. Martin; Ind., retiring	Reuben Chapman; Dem., 56.8%	Nicholas Davis; Whig, 43.2%	December 16, 1847	Two years	Four out of six years	None
August 6 1849	Reuben Chapman; Dem., lost nomination	Henry W. Collier; Dem., 98.2%	unopposed	December 17, 1849	Two years	Four out of six years	None
August 4 1851	Henry W. Collier; Dem., running	Henry W. Collier; Dem., 85.8%	James Shields; Whig, 13.2%	December 17, 1851	Two years	Four out of six years	None
August 1 1853	Henry W. Collier; Dem., term-limited	John A. Winston; Dem., 62.7%	William S. Earnest; Whig, 23.1%	December 20, 1853	Two years	Four out of six years	None
August 6 1855	John A. Winston; Dem., running	John A. Winston; Dem., 57.8%	George D. Shortridge; Know Nothing, 42.2%	December 20, 1855	Two years	Four out of six years	None
August 3 1857	John A. Winston; Dem., term-limited	Andrew B. Moore; Dem., 94.5%	unopposed	December 1, 1857	Two years	Four out of six years	None
August 1 1859	Andrew B. Moore; Dem., running	Andrew B. Moore; Dem., 72.8%	William F. Samford; Southern Rights Dem., 27.2%	December 1, 1859	Two years	Four out of six years	None
August 5 1861	Andrew B. Moore; Dem., term-limited	John Gill Shorter; Dem., 57.6%	Thomas H. Watts; Whig, 42.4%	December 2, 1861	Two years	Four out of six years	None
August 3 1863	John Gill Shorter; Dem., running	Thomas H. Watts; Whig, 77.8%	John Gill Shorter; Dem., 22.2%	December 1, 1863	Two years	Four out of six years	None
November 6 1865	Lewis E. Parsons (Note: Parsons was appointed provisional governor by President Andrew Johnson following the arrest and removal of Watts at the end of the American Civil War.); Appointed, retiring	Robert M. Patton; Nonpartisan, 45.2%	Michael J. Bulger; Nonpartisan, 35.9%	December 13, 1865	1865 constitution		
November 6 1865	Lewis E. Parsons; Appointed, retiring	Robert M. Patton; Nonpartisan, 45.2%	Michael J. Bulger; Nonpartisan, 35.9%	December 13, 1865	Two years	Four out of six years	None
February 4 1868	Robert M. Patton; Whig, retiring	William Hugh Smith; Rep., 100%	unopposed	July 14, 1868	1868 constitution		
February 4 1868	Robert M. Patton; Whig, retiring	William Hugh Smith; Rep., 100%	unopposed	July 14, 1868	Two years	None	None
November 8 1870	William Hugh Smith; Rep., running	Robert B. Lindsay; Dem., 50.5%	William Hugh Smith; Rep., 49.5%	November 26, 1870	Two years	None	None
November 5 1872	Robert B. Lindsay; Dem., retiring	David P. Lewis; Rep., 52.5%	Thomas H. Herndon; Dem., 47.5%	November 25, 1872	Two years	None	None
November 3 1874	David P. Lewis; Rep., running	George S. Houston; Dem., 53.3%	David P. Lewis; Rep., 46.7%	November 24, 1874	Two years	None	None
August 7 1876	George S. Houston; Dem., running	George S. Houston; Dem., 63.4%	Noadiah Woodruff; Rep., 36.6%	November 25, 1876	1875 constitution		
August 7 1876	George S. Houston; Dem., running	George S. Houston; Dem., 63.4%	Noadiah Woodruff; Rep., 36.6%	November 25, 1876	Two years	None	None
August 5 1878	George S. Houston; Dem., retiring	Rufus W. Cobb; Dem., 100%	unopposed	November 27, 1878	Two years	None	None
August 2 1880	Rufus W. Cobb; Dem., running	Rufus W. Cobb; Dem., 76.1%	James Madison Pickens; Greenback, 23.9%	November 30, 1880	Two years	None	None
August 7 1882	Rufus W. Cobb; Dem., retiring	Edward A. O'Neal; Dem., 68.7%	James L. Sheffield; Rep., 31.3%	December 1, 1882	Two years	None	None
August 4 1884	Edward A. O'Neal; Dem., running	Edward A. O'Neal; Dem., 99.7%	unopposed	December 1, 1884	Two years	None	None
August 2 1886	Edward A. O'Neal; Dem., retiring	Thomas Seay; Dem., 79.4%	Arthur Bingham; Rep., 20.1%	December 1, 1886	Two years	None	None
August 6 1888	Thomas Seay; Dem., running	Thomas Seay; Dem., 77.6%	W. T. Ewing; Rep., 22.2%	December 1, 1888	Two years	None	None
August 4 1890	Thomas Seay; Dem., retiring	Thomas G. Jones; Dem., 76.1%	Benjamin M. Long; Rep., 23.1%	December 1, 1890	Two years	None	None
August 1 1892	Thomas G. Jones; Dem., running	Thomas G. Jones; Dem., 52.2%	Reuben Kolb; Ind. Dem. , 47.5%	December 1, 1892	Two years	None	None
August 6 1894	Thomas G. Jones; Dem., retiring	William C. Oates; Dem., 57.1%	Reuben Kolb; Pop., 42.9%	December 1, 1894	Two years	None	None
August 3 1896	William C. Oates; Dem., retiring	Joseph F. Johnston; Dem., 59.0%	Albert T. Goodwyn; Pop., 41.0%	December 1, 1896	Two years	None	None
August 1 1898	Joseph F. Johnston; Dem., running	Joseph F. Johnston; Dem., 67.0%	Albert T. Goodwyn; Pop., 30.3%	December 1, 1898	Two years	None	None
August 6 1900	Joseph F. Johnston; Dem., retiring	William J. Samford; Dem., 71.0%	John A. Steele; Rep., 17.4%	December 1, 1900	Two years	None	None
November 2 1902	William D. Jelks (Note: Jelks succeeded Samford upon his death on June 11, 1901.); Dem., running	William D. Jelks; Dem., 73.7%	John A. W. Smith; Rep., 26.3%	January 19, 1903	1901 constitution		
November 2 1902	William D. Jelks; Dem., running	William D. Jelks; Dem., 73.7%	John A. W. Smith; Rep., 26.3%	January 19, 1903	Four years	Cannot succeed self	First Monday after second Tuesday in January
November 6 1906	William D. Jelks; Dem., term-limited	B. B. Comer; Dem., 85.5%	Asa E. Stratton; Rep., 13.9%	January 14, 1907	Four years	Cannot succeed self	First Monday after second Tuesday in January
November 8 1910	B. B. Comer; Dem., term-limited	Emmet O'Neal; Dem., 78.7%	Joseph Oswalt Thompson; Rep., 19.4%	January 17, 1911	Four years	Cannot succeed self	First Monday after second Tuesday in January
November 3 1914	Emmet O'Neal; Dem., term-limited	Charles Henderson; Dem., 78.7%	John B. Shields; Rep., 15.1%	January 19, 1915	Four years	Cannot succeed self	First Monday after second Tuesday in January
November 2 1918	Charles Henderson; Dem., term-limited	Thomas Kilby; Dem., 80.2%	Dallas B. Smith; Ind., 19.8%	January 21, 1919	Four years	Cannot succeed self	First Monday after second Tuesday in January
November 7 1922	Thomas Kilby; Dem., term-limited	William W. Brandon; Dem., 77.6%	Oliver D. Street; Rep., 21.3%	January 16, 1923	Four years	Cannot succeed self	First Monday after second Tuesday in January
November 2 1926	William W. Brandon; Dem., term-limited	Bibb Graves; Dem., 81.2%	J. A. Bingham; Rep., 18.8%	January 18, 1927	Four years	Cannot succeed self	First Monday after second Tuesday in January
November 4 1930	Bibb Graves; Dem., term-limited	Benjamin M. Miller; Dem., 61.8%	Hugh A. Locke; Ind., 38.2%	January 20, 1931	Four years	Cannot succeed self	First Monday after second Tuesday in January
November 2 1934	Benjamin M. Miller; Dem., term-limited	Bibb Graves; Dem., 86.9%	Edmund H. Dryer; Rep., 12.7%	January 15, 1935	Four years	Cannot succeed self	First Monday after second Tuesday in January
November 8 1938	Bibb Graves; Dem., retiring	Frank M. Dixon; Dem., 87.4%	W. A. Clardy; Rep., 12.5%	January 17, 1939	Four years	Cannot succeed self	First Monday after second Tuesday in January
November 3 1942	Frank M. Dixon; Dem., term-limited	Chauncey Sparks; Dem., 89.0%	Hugh McEniry; Rep., 10.5%	January 19, 1943	Four years	Cannot succeed self	First Monday after second Tuesday in January
November 5 1946	Chauncey Sparks; Dem., term-limited	Jim Folsom; Dem., 88.7%	Lyman Ward; Rep., 11.3%	January 21, 1947	Four years	Cannot succeed self	First Monday after second Tuesday in January
November 7 1950	Jim Folsom; Dem., term-limited	Gordon Persons; Dem., 91.1%	John S. Crowder; Rep., 8.9%	January 16, 1951	Four years	Cannot succeed self	First Monday after second Tuesday in January
November 2 1954	Gordon Persons; Dem., term-limited	Jim Folsom; Dem., 73.4%	Tom Abernathy; Rep., 26.6%	January 18, 1955	Four years	Cannot succeed self	First Monday after second Tuesday in January
November 4 1958	Jim Folsom; Dem., term-limited	John M. Patterson; Dem., 88.4%	William Longshore; Rep., 11.2%	January 20, 1959	Four years	Cannot succeed self	First Monday after second Tuesday in January
November 6 1962	John M. Patterson; Dem., term-limited	George Wallace; Dem., 96.3%	Frank P. Walls; Ind., 3.7%	January 15, 1963	Four years	Cannot succeed self	First Monday after second Tuesday in January
November 8 1966	George Wallace; Dem., term-limited	Lurleen Wallace; Dem., 63.4%	James D. Martin; Rep., 31.0%	January 17, 1967	Four years	Cannot succeed self	First Monday after second Tuesday in January
November 3 1970	Albert Brewer (Note: Brewer succeeded Wallace upon her death on May 7, 1868.); Dem., lost nomination	George Wallace; Dem., 74.5%	John L. Cashin Jr. Nat. Dem., 14.7%	January 19, 1971	Four years	1968 amendment	First Monday after second Tuesday in January
November 3 1970	Albert Brewer; Dem., lost nomination	George Wallace; Dem., 74.5%	John L. Cashin Jr. Nat. Dem., 14.7%	January 19, 1971	Four years	Can succeed self once	First Monday after second Tuesday in January
November 5 1974	George Wallace; Dem., running	George Wallace; Dem., 83.2%	Elvin McCary; Rep., 14.8%	January 21, 1975	Four years	Can succeed self once	First Monday after second Tuesday in January
November 7 1978	George Wallace; Dem., term-limited	Fob James; Dem., 72.6%	H. Guy Hunt; Rep., 25.9%	January 16, 1979	Four years	Can succeed self once	First Monday after second Tuesday in January
November 2 1982	Fob James; Dem., retiring	George Wallace; Dem., 57.6%	Emory Folmar; Rep., 39.1%	January 18, 1983	Four years	Can succeed self once	First Monday after second Tuesday in January
November 4 1986	George Wallace; Dem., retiring	H. Guy Hunt; Rep., 56.4%	Bill Baxley; Dem., 43.6%	January 20, 1987	Four years	Can succeed self once	First Monday after second Tuesday in January
November 6 1990	H. Guy Hunt; Rep., running	H. Guy Hunt; Rep., 52.1%	Paul Hubbert; Dem., 47.9%	January 15, 1991	Four years	Can succeed self once	First Monday after second Tuesday in January
November 8 1994	Jim Folsom Jr. (Note: Folsom succeeded Hunt upon his removal on April 22, 1993.); Dem., running	Fob James; Rep., 50.4%	Jim Folsom Jr. Dem., 49.6%	January 17, 1995	Four years	Can succeed self once	First Monday after second Tuesday in January
November 3 1998	Fob James; Rep., running	Don Siegelman; Dem., 57.8%	Fob James; Rep., 42.2%	January 19, 1999	Four years	Can succeed self once	First Monday after second Tuesday in January
November 5 2002	Don Siegelman; Dem., running	Bob Riley; Rep., 49.2%	Don Siegelman; Dem., 48.9%	January 21, 2003	Four years	Can succeed self once	First Monday after second Tuesday in January
November 7 2006	Bob Riley; Rep., running	Bob Riley; Rep., 57.4%	Lucy Baxley; Dem., 41.6%	January 16, 2007	Four years	Can succeed self once	First Monday after second Tuesday in January
November 2 2010	Bob Riley; Rep., term-limited	Robert J. Bentley; Rep., 57.6%	Ron Sparks; Dem., 41.9%	January 18, 2011	Four years	Can succeed self once	First Monday after second Tuesday in January
November 4 2014	Robert J. Bentley; Rep., running	Robert J. Bentley; Rep., 63.6%	Parker Griffith; Dem., 36.2%	January 20, 2015	Four years	Can succeed self once	First Monday after second Tuesday in January
November 6 2018	Kay Ivey (Note: Ivey succeeded Bentley upon his resignation on April 10, 2017.); Rep., running	Kay Ivey; Rep., 59.5%	Walt Maddox; Dem., 40.4%	January 15, 2019	Four years	Can succeed self once	First Monday after second Tuesday in January
November 8 2022	Kay Ivey; Rep., running	Kay Ivey; Rep., 66.9%	Yolanda Flowers; Dem., 29.2%	January 17, 2023	Four years	Can succeed self once	First Monday after second Tuesday in January
November 3 2026	Kay Ivey; Rep., term-limited	Upcoming election; results to be determined		January 19, 2027	2022 constitution		
November 3 2026	Kay Ivey; Rep., term-limited	Upcoming election; results to be determined		January 19, 2027	Four years	Can succeed self once	First Monday after second Tuesday in January

== See also ==
- Gubernatorial lines of succession in the United States § Alabama
- First ladies and gentlemen of Alabama
- Lieutenant Governor of Alabama
- List of Alabama state legislatures

== Sources ==
- "Former Alabama Governors". National Governors Association.
- "Alabama Governors". Alabama Department of Archives and History. Archived from the original on September 6, 2026.
- "Alabama Constitution". State Democracy Research Initiative. University of Wisconsin Law School.
- Dubin, Michael J. (2003). United States Gubernatorial Elections, 1776–1860: The Official Results by State and County. McFarland. ISBN 0-7864-1439-1 – via Internet Archive.
- Glashan, Roy R. (1979). American Governors and Gubernatorial Elections, 1775-1978. Meckler Books. ISBN 0-7201-1511-6 – via Internet Archive.
- Kallenbach, Joseph E.; Kallenbach, Jessamine S. (1977). American State Governors, 1776-1976. Oceana Publications. ISBN 978-0-379-00665-0 – via Internet Archive.
- McMullin, Thomas A.; Walker, David (1984). Biographical Directory of American Territorial Governors. Meckler Publishing. ISBN 0-930466-11-X – via Internet Archive.
- Mullaney, Marie Marmo (1994). Biographical Directory of the Governors of the United States, 1988–1994. Greenwood Publishing Group. ISBN 0-313-28312-5 – via Internet Archive.
- Sobel, Robert; Raimo, John (1978). Biographical Directory of the Governors of the United States, 1789-1978. Vol. 1. Meckler Books. ISBN 0-930466-01-2 – via Internet Archive.
- Thorpe, Francis Newton, ed. (1909). The Federal and State Constitutions, Colonial Charters, and Other Organic Laws of the States, Territories, and Colonies Now or Heretofore Forming the United States of America. Vol. 1. United States Government Publishing Office – via Internet Archive.
