= 1847 Alabama gubernatorial election =

- August 2, 1847
- Turnout: 9.12%
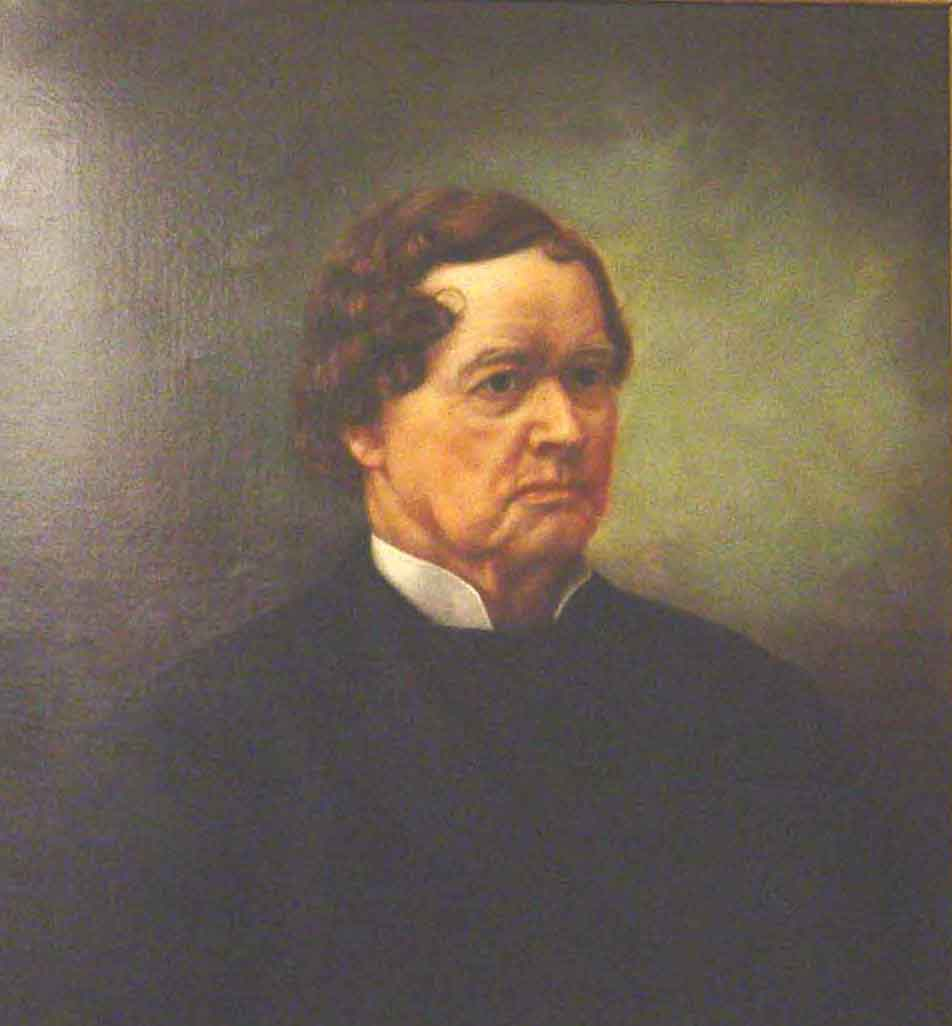

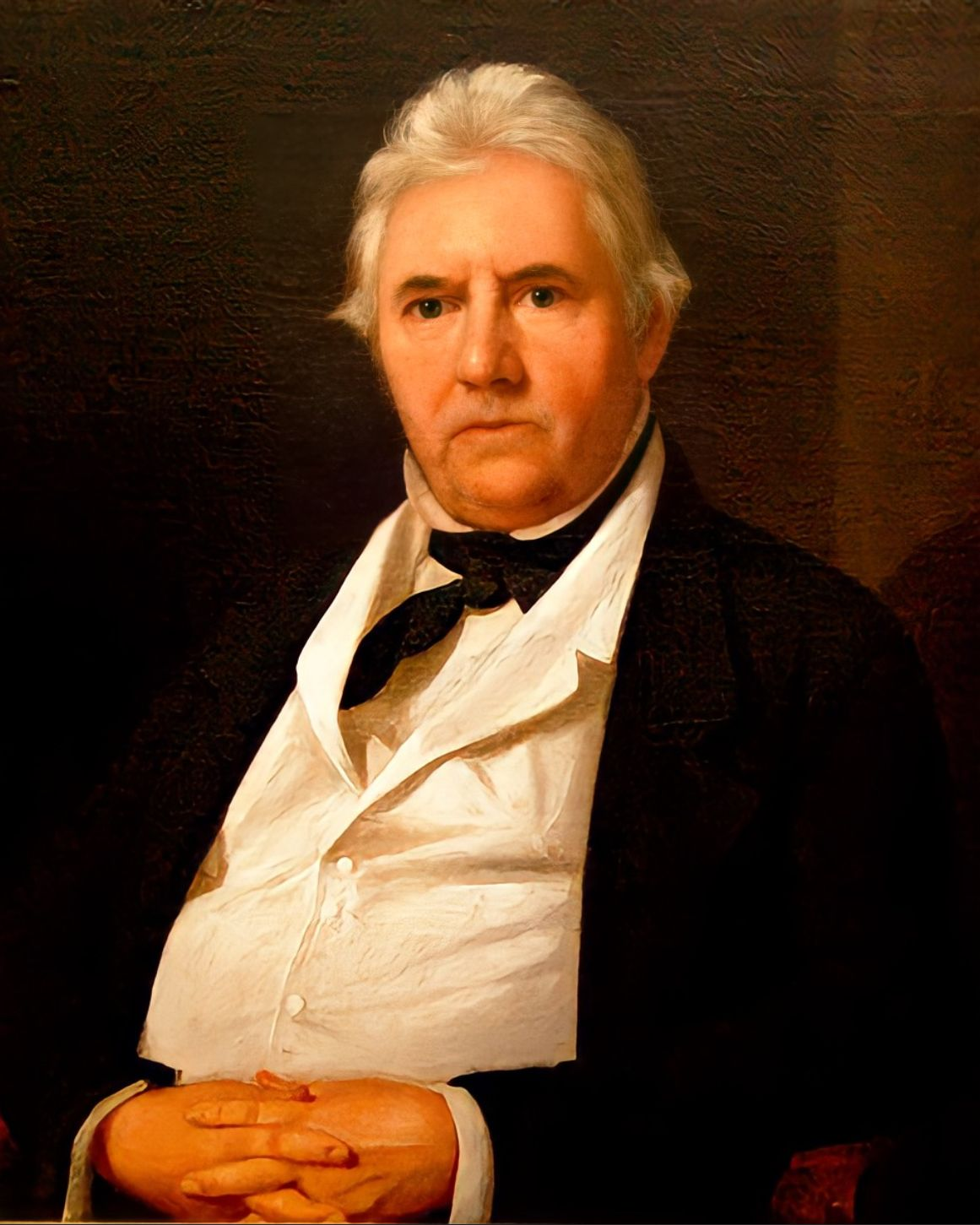
Nominee	Reuben Chapman	Nicholas Davis
Party	Democratic	Whig
Popular vote	30,622	23,247
Percentage	56.84%	43.16%
- County results Chapman: 50–60% 60–70% 70–80% 80–90% >90% Davis: 50–60% 60–70% 70–80%
Governor before election
Joshua L. Martin
Democratic
Elected Governor
Reuben Chapman
Democratic

The 1847 Alabama gubernatorial election took place on August 2, 1847, in order to elect the governor of Alabama. Democrat Reuben Chapman won his only term with a 56.84% majority.

== Candidates ==
=== Democratic Party ===
- Reuben Chapman, member of the U.S. House from 1835 to 1847.

=== Whig Party ===
- Nicholas Davis, candidate in 1831 and 1845. Member of the Alabama House of Representatives from 1819 to 1820.

== Election ==
1847 Alabama gubernatorial election
Party	Candidate	Votes	%	±%
Democratic	Reuben Chapman	30,622	56.84%	+11.56%
Whig	Nicholas Davis	23,247	43.16%	+41.98%
Total votes		53,869	100%	N/A
Democratic gain from Independent				
