= Samuel B. Moore =

American politician

6th Governor of Alabama
- In office March 3, 1831 – November 26, 1831
- Preceded by: Gabriel Moore
- Succeeded by: John Gayle

Member of the Alabama House of Representatives
- In office 1823

Member of the Alabama Senate
- In office 1828

Personal details
- Born: 1789 Beech Hill, Tennessee, US
- Died: November 7, 1846 (aged 56–57) Carrollton, Alabama, US
- Resting place: Carrollton Cemetery, Carrollton, Alabama
- Party: Democratic

Samuel B. Moore (1789 – November 7, 1846) was the sixth governor of Alabama from March 3 to November 26, 1831. He was president of the Alabama Senate when Governor Gabriel Moore was elected to the United States Senate, and so became governor when Gabriel Moore resigned to take the seat.

== Biography ==
Samuel Moore was born in Beech Hill, Tennessee, in 1789 but moved to Jackson County, Alabama, when he was still young.

His political career began in 1823 when he was elected to the Alabama House of Representatives and then elected to the Alabama Senate in 1828. He served as president of the Senate in 1831 when he succeeded Gabriel Moore.

Like his predecessor, Samuel Moore continued to survey the Coosa River through The Board of Internal Improvement, build infrastructure, and oppose nullification. Moore strongly supported the Bank of the State of Alabama.

Later, in the 1831 election, Moore was entrenched in a heated election battle against John Gayle, who eventually defeated him. After his defeat, he served as the judge of the Pickens County Court from 1835 to 1841.

He was re-elected to his State Senate post in 1834 and again served as the Senate's president in 1835. He later returned home to Pickens County, Alabama, and served on its county court from 1835 until 1841.

Moore died in 1846 at age 57 and is interred at the city cemetery in Carrollton in Pickens County. No portrait or other likeness of Moore is known to exist.

Political offices
Preceded by Gabriel Moore	Governor of Alabama; 1831	Succeeded by John Gayle
