= Arthur P. Bagby =

Democratic Governor of Alabama and U.S. Senator from Alabama

Arthur Pendleton Bagby
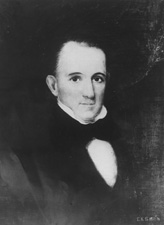

U.S. Minister to Russia
- In office January 14, 1849 – May 14, 1849
- President: James K. Polk; Zachary Taylor
- Preceded by: Ralph I. Ingersoll
- Succeeded by: Neill S. Brown

United States Senator from Alabama
- In office November 24, 1841 – June 16, 1848
- Preceded by: Clement Comer Clay
- Succeeded by: William R. King

10th Governor of Alabama
- In office November 30, 1837 – November 22, 1841
- Preceded by: Hugh McVay
- Succeeded by: Benjamin Fitzpatrick

Member of the Alabama Senate
- In office 1825

Member of the Alabama House of Representatives
- In office 1821–1822; 1824; 1834–1836

Personal details
- Born: 1794 Louisa County, Virginia, US
- Died: September 21, 1858 (aged 63–64) Mobile, Alabama, US
- Resting place: Magnolia Cemetery (Mobile, Alabama)
- Party: Democratic

Arthur Pendleton Bagby (1794 – September 21, 1858) was the tenth governor of Alabama from 1837 to 1841. He was a Democrat.

== Biography ==
Born in Louisa County, Virginia, in 1794, he studied law and was admitted to the bar in 1819, practicing in Claiborne, Alabama.

== Political career ==
=== State House and Senate ===
He was a member of the Alabama State House of Representatives in 1821, 1822, 1824, and 1834–1836, serving as the youngest-ever speaker in 1822 and 1836, and he served in the Alabama State Senate in 1825.

=== Panic of 1837 and Governorship ===
During Bagby's administration, the country was plagued by economic depression due to the Panic of 1837. Bagby introduced measures to assist the state banks, but the state legislature rejected most measures. All the state banks were closed by Bagby's successor, Governor Benjamin Fitzpatrick.

=== US Senate ===
He served in the U.S. Senate from November 21, 1841, when he was elected to fill the vacancy caused by Clement C. Clay's resignation, to June 16, 1848.

During his time in the Senate, he was chairman of the Committee on Territories, and the Committee on Indian Affairs, and a member of the Committee on Claims. As a Senator, he supported the annexation of Texas.

=== Minister of Russia ===
He then resigned to become Minister to Russia from 1848 to 1849.

== Personal life ==
Bagby's first wife, Emily Steele of Georgia, died in 1825 and is buried in Claiborne, Alabama. Bagby died in 1858 in Mobile, Alabama and he was interred in Magnolia Cemetery.

== Sources ==
- United States Congress. "Arthur P. Bagby (id: B000030)". Biographical Directory of the United States Congress. Retrieved on 2008-08-10
- Eicher, John H., and David J. Eicher, Civil War High Commands. Stanford: Stanford University Press, 2001. ISBN 0-8047-3641-3. p. 588.
- Craig H. Roell: Bagby, Arthur Pendleton from the Handbook of Texas Online. Retrieved December 23, 2008.

Party political offices
Preceded by Clement Comer Clay	Democratic nominee for Governor of Alabama; 1837, 1839	Succeeded by Benjamin Fitzpatrick
Political offices
Preceded by Hugh McVay	Governor of Alabama; 1837–1841	Succeeded by Benjamin Fitzpatrick
U.S. Senate
Preceded by Clement C. Clay	U.S. senator (Class 3) from Alabama; November 24, 1841 – June 16, 1848; Served alongside: William R. King and Dixon H. Lewis	Succeeded by William R. King
Diplomatic posts
Preceded by Ralph I. Ingersoll	United States Ambassador to Russia; June 15, 1848 – May 14, 1849	Succeeded by Neill S. Brown
