= Reuben Chapman =

American politician (1799–1882)

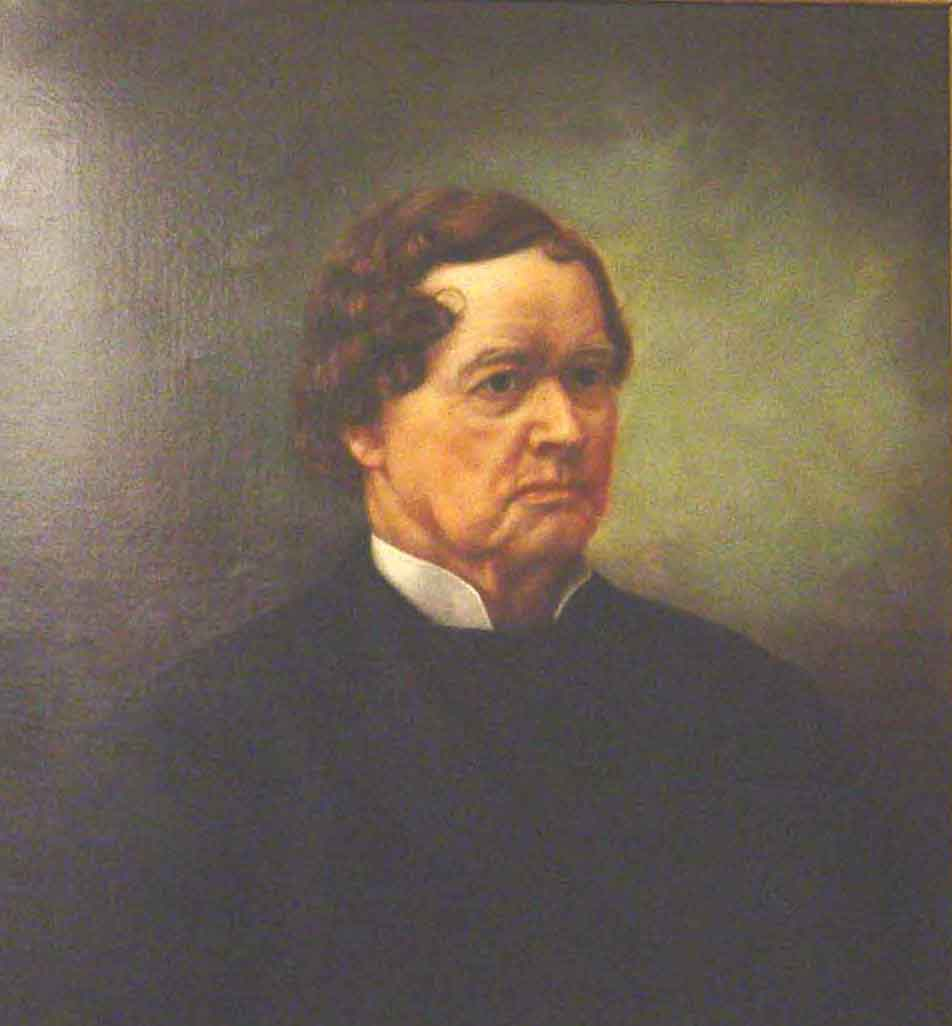

13th Governor of Alabama
- In office December 16, 1847 – December 17, 1849
- Preceded by: Joshua L. Martin
- Succeeded by: Henry W. Collier

Member of the U.S. House of Representatives from Alabama
- In office March 4, 1835 – March 3, 1847
- Preceded by: Clement Comer Clay
- Succeeded by: Williamson R. W. Cobb
- Constituency: 1st district (1835–1841); At-large district (1841–1843); 6th district (1843–1847)

Personal details
- Born: July 15, 1799 Bowling Green, Virginia, U.S.
- Died: May 17, 1882 (aged 82) Huntsville, Alabama, U.S.
- Resting place: Maple Hill Cemetery
- Party: Democratic

Reuben Chapman (July 15, 1799 – May 17, 1882) was an American lawyer and politician. He served six terms in the U.S. House of Representatives from 1835 to 1847, and as the 13th governor of Alabama from 1847 to 1849.

== Personal life ==
Born on July 15, 1799, in Bowling Green, Virginia, he moved to Alabama in 1824, where he established a law practice. He was colleagues with Thomas McElderry and the two of them would go on to serve on the Old Bank of Decatur board together in the late 1870s and early 1880s.

== Political career ==
He represented Alabama in the U.S. House of Representatives from March 4, 1835, to March 3, 1847, and served as the 13th Governor of the U.S. state of Alabama from 1847 to 1849.

Circa 1880 from left to right: Br. Gen. William B. McClellan, age 83; Capt. John T. Rather, age 87; Col. Thomas McElderry, age 90; Gov. Reuben Chapman, age 79; from Tom McElderry's families photo collection

=== Relationship with French ambassador ===
While a member of the House of Representatives, he had a very contentious relationship with the French ambassador, Louis Adolphe Aimé Fourier, comte de Bacourt. In 1844 the ambassador had made remarks towards him, and Virginia congressman George W. Hopkins, and Chapman challenged Louis Adolphe Aimé Fourier, comte de Bacourt to a duel. However, the French ambassador backed down. That same year the French ambassador also offended Virginia congressman Lewis Steenrod, though it is unknown precisely what words were exchanged. Chapman and Hopkins grew so hostile towards the French ambassador that in 1846, President James K. Polk eventually asked the French government to send Monsieur Fourier home and select a new ambassador to the United States.

== Death ==
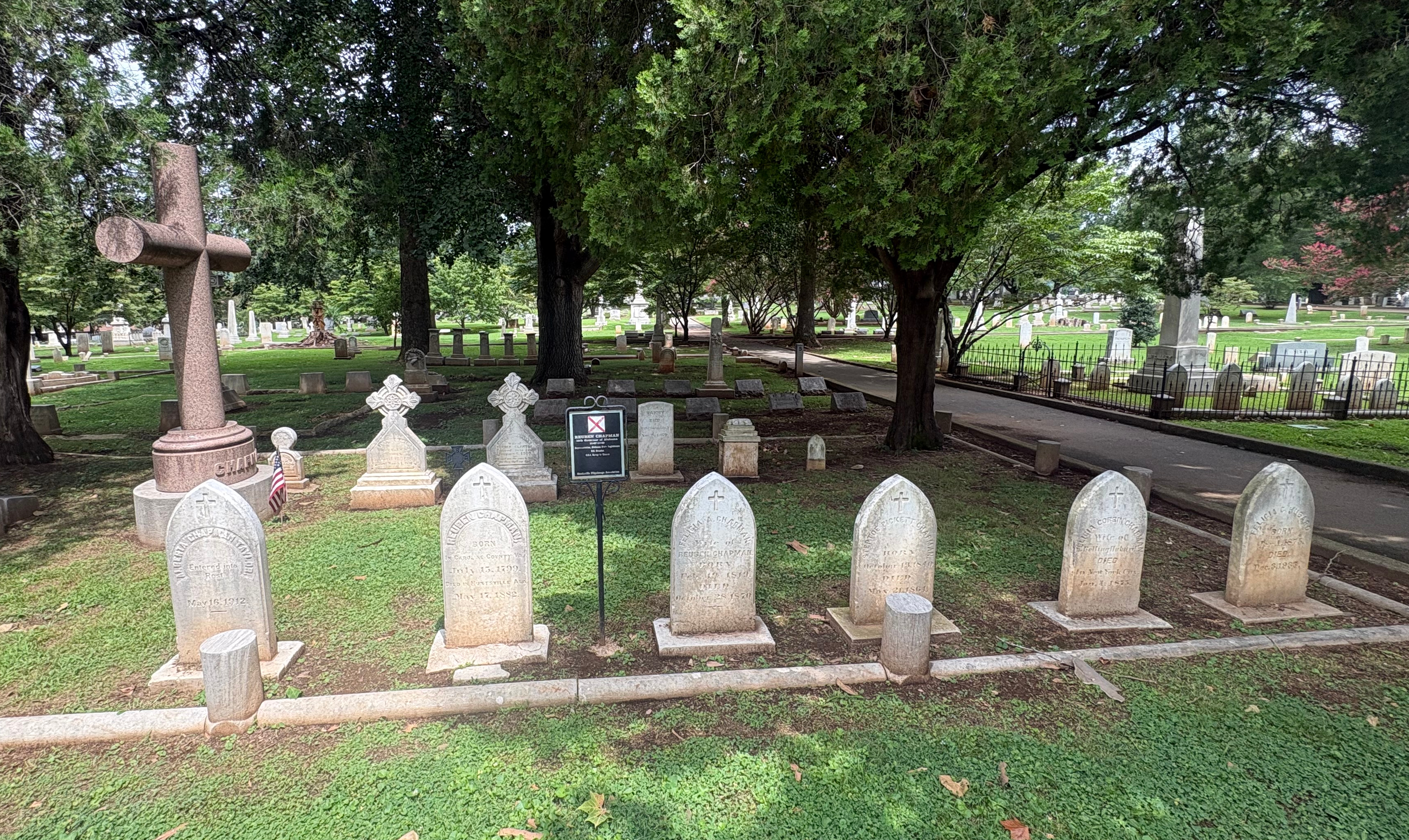
Chapman's grave (second from left) at Maple Hill Cemetery

He died in Huntsville, Alabama on May 17, 1882, and was buried at Maple Hill Cemetery.

== Sources ==
- Biographic sketch at U.S. Congress website
- Alabama Department of Archives and History
- Reuben Chapman 1847-1849- Encyclopedia of Alabama
- Governor Reuben Chapman by Thomas McAdory Owen · 1921

Party political offices
Preceded by Nathaniel Terry	Democratic nominee for Governor of Alabama; 1847	Succeeded by Henry W. Collier
U.S. House of Representatives
Preceded by Clement Comer Clay	Member of the U.S. House of Representatives from Alabama's 1st congressional district March 4, 1835 – March 3, 1841	Succeeded by District inactive
Preceded by District inactive	Member of the U.S. House of Representatives from Alabama's at-large congressional district March 4, 1841 – March 3, 1843	Succeeded by District inactive
Preceded by District created	Member of the U.S. House of Representatives from Alabama's 6th congressional district March 4, 1843 – March 3, 1847	Succeeded by Williamson Robert Winfield Cobb
Political offices
Preceded by Joshua L. Martin	Governor of Alabama; 1847–1849	Succeeded by Henry W. Collier
