= 1827 Alabama gubernatorial election =

- August 6, 1827
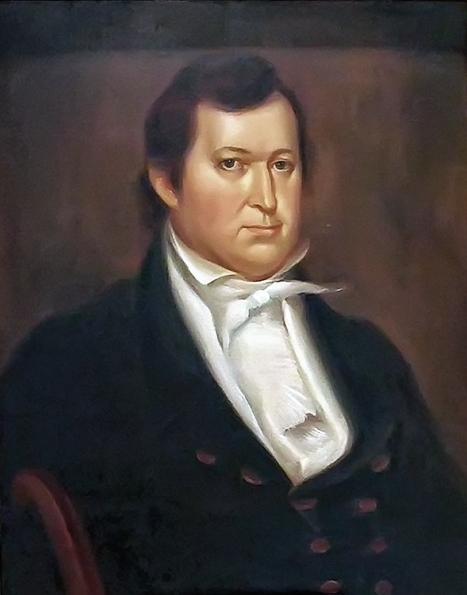
Nominee	John Murphy
Party	Jacksonian
Popular vote	9,231
Percentage	99.25%
- County results Murphy: 80–90% >90% Unknown/No Vote
Governor before election
John Murphy
Jacksonian
Elected Governor
John Murphy
Jacksonian

The 1827 Alabama gubernatorial election was an uncontested election held on August 6, 1827, to elect the governor of Alabama. Jacksonian candidate John Murphy ran unopposed and won 99.25% of the vote. Various write-in candidates made up the other 0.75%.

== General election ==
=== Candidates ===
- John Murphy, member of the Alabama House of Representatives in 1820 and the Alabama Senate in 1822, Governor of Alabama since 1825.

=== Results ===
1827 Alabama gubernatorial election
Party	Candidate	Votes	%	±%
Jacksonian	John Murphy (incumbent)	9,231	99.25%	−0.75%
Write-in		70	0.75%	+0.75%
Total votes		9,301	100%	N/A
Jacksonian hold				
