= 1825 Alabama gubernatorial election =

- August 4, 1825
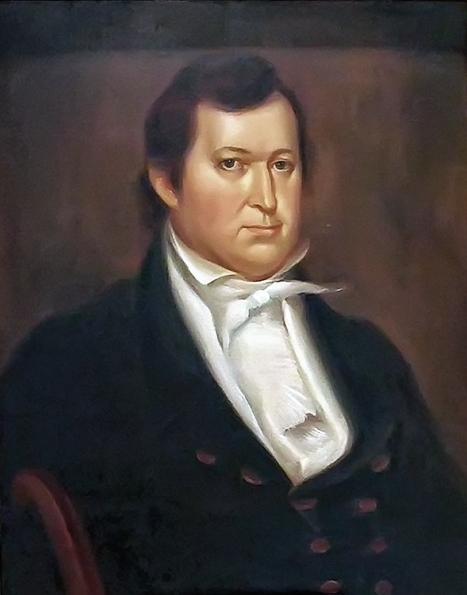
Nominee	John Murphy
Party	Jacksonian
Popular vote	12,184
Percentage	100.00%
- County results Murphy: 100% Unknown/No Vote
Governor before election
Israel Pickens
National Republican
Elected Governor
John Murphy
Jacksonian

The 1825 Alabama gubernatorial election was an uncontested election held on August 1, 1825, to elect the governor of Alabama. Jacksonian candidate John Murphy ran unopposed and so won 100% of the vote.

== General election ==
=== Candidates ===
- John Murphy, member of the Alabama House of Representatives in 1820 and the Alabama Senate in 1822, chosen successor of former governor Israel Pickens.

=== Results ===
1825 Alabama gubernatorial election
Party	Candidate	Votes	%	±%
Jacksonian	John Murphy	12,184	100%	+100.00%
Total votes		12,184	100%	N/A
Jacksonian gain from Democratic-Republican				
