= 1835 Alabama gubernatorial election =

- August 3, 1835
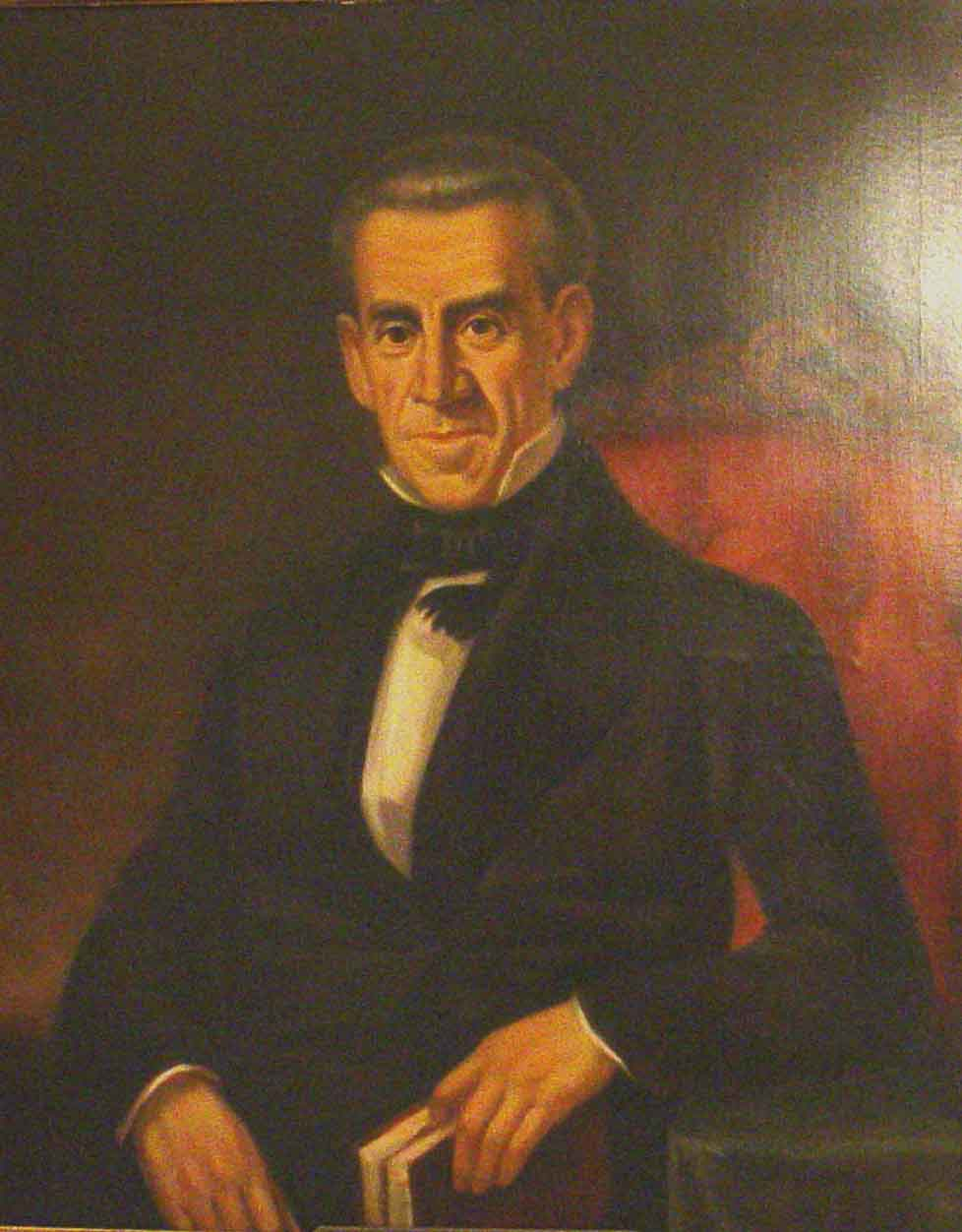

Nominee	Clement C. Clay	Enoch Parsons
Party	Democratic	Whig
Popular vote	23,279	12,209
Percentage	65.44%	34.32%
- County results Clay: 50–60% 60–70% 70–80% 80–90% >90% Parsons: 50–60% 60–70% 70–80% Unknown/No Vote
Governor before election
John Gayle
Democratic
Elected Governor
Clement C. Clay
Democratic

The 1835 Alabama gubernatorial election was an election held on August 3, 1835, to elect the governor of Alabama. Democratic candidate Clement Comer Clay beat Whig candidate Enoch Parsons with 65.44% of the vote.

== General election ==
=== Candidates ===
- Clement Comer Clay, Representative for 1st congressional district 1829–1835.
- Enoch Parsons, President of Middletown branch, Bank of America 1818–1824.

=== Results ===
1835 Alabama gubernatorial election
Party	Candidate	Votes	%	±%
Democratic	Clement Comer Clay	23,279	65.44%	−34.56%
Whig	Enoch Parsons	12,209	34.32%	+34.32%
Write-in		72	0.23%	+0.23%
Total votes		35,560	100%	N/A
Democratic hold				

==== By county ====
County results (Note: Dubin could not locate returns for Coosa and Dale counties. A total of 72 scattered write-in votes were reported.)
County	Clement C. Clay Democratic		Enoch Parsons Whig		Total Votes
County	#	%	#	%	Total Votes
Autauga	631	53.10%	557	46.90%	1,188
Baldwin	173	87.80%	24	12.20%	197
Barbour	347	58.40%	247	41.60%	594
Benton	771	93.20%	56	6.80%	827
Bibb	649	79.00%	172	21.00%	821
Blount	989	96.60%	35	3.40%	1,024
Butler	122	24.40%	378	75.60%	500
Chambers	250	65.60%	131	34.40%	381
Clarke	420	67.90%	199	32.10%	619
Conecuh	171	42.60%	234	57.40%	405
Coosa	--	--	--	--	--
Covington	90	73.80%	32	26.20%	122
Dale	--	--	--	--	--
Dallas	705	44.70%	871	55.30%	1,576
Fayette	590	92.00%	51	8.00%	641
Franklin	654	48.90%	684	51.10%	1,338
Greene	676	45.60%	807	54.40%	1,483
Henry	287	55.80%	227	44.20%	514
Jackson	2,427	92.90%	181	7.10%	2,608
Jefferson	657	78.10%	174	21.90%	831
Lauderdale	1,164	71.80%	458	28.20%	1,622
Lawrence	920	62.30%	557	37.70%	1,477
Limestone	812	48.80%	853	51.20%	1,665
Lowndes	399	47.30%	444	52.70%	843
Macon	59	38.30%	95	61.70%	154
Madison	1,984	82.90%	410	17.10%	2,394
Marengo	359	35.10%	664	64.90%	1,023
Marion	374	74.50%	138	25.50%	512
Mobile	424	48.80%	444	51.20%	868
Monroe	365	56.80%	210	32.70%	575
Montgomery	877	53.90%	751	46.10%	1,628
Morgan	986	75.30%	324	24.70%	1,310
Perry	425	35.90%	758	64.10%	1,183
Pickens	728	56.80%	554	43.20%	1,282
Pike	429	62.40%	158	37.60%	587
Randolph	83	100.00%	0	0.00%	83
Russell	41	34.20%	79	65.80%	120
St. Clair	944	90.00%	105	10.00%	1,049
Shelby	314	47.80%	343	52.20%	657
Sumter	652	61.90%	401	38.10%	1,053
Talladega	757	86.70%	116	13.30%	873
Tallapoosa	113	43.80%	145	56.20%	258
Tuscaloosa	1,106	70.30%	468	29.70%	1,574
Walker	367	91.10%	36	8.90%	403
Washington	94	31.10%	204	67.50%	298
Wilcox	276	38.40%	443	61.60%	719
Total	23,279	65.60%	12,209	34.40%	35,488
