= Gabriel Moore =

American politician and 5th Governor of Alabama

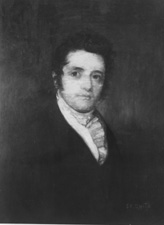

United States Senator from Alabama
- In office March 4, 1831 – March 3, 1837
- Preceded by: John McKinley
- Succeeded by: John McKinley

5th Governor of Alabama
- In office November 25, 1829 – March 3, 1831
- Preceded by: John Murphy
- Succeeded by: Samuel B. Moore

Member of the U.S. House of Representatives from Alabama
- In office March 4, 1821 – March 4, 1829
- Preceded by: John Crowell (AL); District established (1st)
- Succeeded by: District abolished (AL); Clement Clay (1st)
- Constituency: At-large district (1821-23); 1st district (1823-29)

Member of the Alabama Senate
- In office 1819–1820

Personal details
- Born: 1785 Stokes County, North Carolina
- Died: August 6, 1844 (aged 58–59) near Caddo Lake, Texas
- Resting place: Swanson Cemetery, Harrison County, Texas
- Party: Democratic-Republican, Jacksonian, National Republican
- Spouse: Mary Parham Caller
- Parents: Col. Matthew Moore (1738–1801); Letitia Dalton (1742–1838)

Gabriel Moore (1785 – August 6, 1844) was a Democratic-Republican, later Jacksonian and National Republican politician and the fifth governor of Alabama (1829–1831).

== Life and politics ==
Moore was born in Stokes County, North Carolina, of English descent and some French descent. He moved to Huntsville, Alabama, in 1810. Moore served in the territorial legislatures and was elected to the United States Congress in 1821. He was re-elected to the United States Congress in 1827.

Moore was the second Representative of the state of Alabama and the first Representative of its First Congressional District.

He served one term as representative of the at-large district of Alabama (1821–1823). Moore was one of four candidates in the running. Moore won with 67.57% of the vote. He served as Alabama's 1st district representative (1823–1829). In the 1823 election, he was the only candidate and won all 3,304 votes. In the 1825 election, he was one of two candidates, the other being Clement Comer Clay. Moore won with 71.12% of the vote.

He was elected Governor of Alabama unopposed in 1829, standing as a Jacksonian. In 1831, two years into his four-year governorship, Moore resigned to seek a Class 3 spot in the Senate. In response to his resignation, Moore was replaced as Governor by Alabama Senate President Samuel B. Moore (no relation).

Moore's Senate bid was successful, and he served for six years as Class 3 Senator alongside William R. King before losing out to John McKinley in 1837, who had preceded Moore in 1831. During his tenure in the Senate, Moore also served as chairman of the House Committee on Revolutionary Claims. In 1834, he was one of only two Anti-Jacksonian senators to vote against the censure of President Andrew Jackson.

Following his loss to McKinley, Moore moved near Caddo Lake, Texas, in 1843. He died there on August 6, 1844, and was buried on the plantation of Peter Swanson.

== Sources ==
- United States Congress. "Gabriel Moore (id: M000898)". Biographical Directory of the United States Congress.
- A New Nation Votes

U.S. House of Representatives
Preceded by John Crowell	Member of the U.S. House of Representatives from Alabama's at-large congressional district March 4, 1821 – March 3, 1823	Succeeded by Alabama split into congressional districts
New seat	Member of the U.S. House of Representatives from Alabama's 1st congressional district March 4, 1823 – March 3, 1829	Succeeded by Clement Comer Clay
Political offices
Preceded by John Murphy	Governor of Alabama; November 25, 1829 – March 4, 1831	Succeeded by Samuel B. Moore
U.S. Senate
Preceded by John McKinley	U.S. senator (Class 3) from Alabama; March 4, 1831 – March 4, 1837; Served alongside: William R. King	Succeeded by John McKinley
