= 1845 Alabama gubernatorial election =

- August 4, 1845
- Turnout: 9.57%
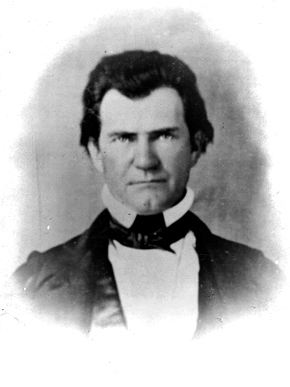

Nominee	Joshua L. Martin	Nathaniel Terry
Party	Independent Democrat	Democratic
Popular vote	30,261	25,587
Percentage	53.55%	45.28%
- Martin: 40–50% 50–60% 60–70% 70–80% 80–90% Terry: 40–50% 50–60% 60–70% 70–80% 80–90% >90% Unknown/No Vote
Governor before election
Benjamin Fitzpatrick
Democratic
Elected Governor
Joshua L. Martin
Independent Politician

The 1845 Alabama gubernatorial election took place on August 4, 1845, in order to elect the governor of Alabama. Term started on December 10, 1845. Independent Joshua L. Martin won his only term as Governor with 53.55% of the vote.

To date, it is the only election where an independent candidate won a gubernatorial election in Alabama.

== Candidates ==
=== Independent ===
- Joshua L. Martin, Member of the U.S. House of Representatives from 1835 to 1839.

=== Democratic Party ===
- Nathaniel Terry

=== Whig Party ===
- Nicholas Davis, previous candidate for this seat in 1831 and member of the Alabama House of Representatives from 1819 to 1820.

== Election ==
1845 Alabama gubernatorial election
Party	Candidate	Votes	%	±%
Independent Democrat	Joshua L. Martin	30,261	53.55%	+53.55%
Democratic	Nathaniel Terry	25,587	45.28%	−54.72%
Whig	Nicholas Davis	665	1.18%	+1.18%
Total votes		56,513	100%	N/A
Independent Democrat gain from Democratic				
