= Clement Comer Clay =

American politician (1789–1866)

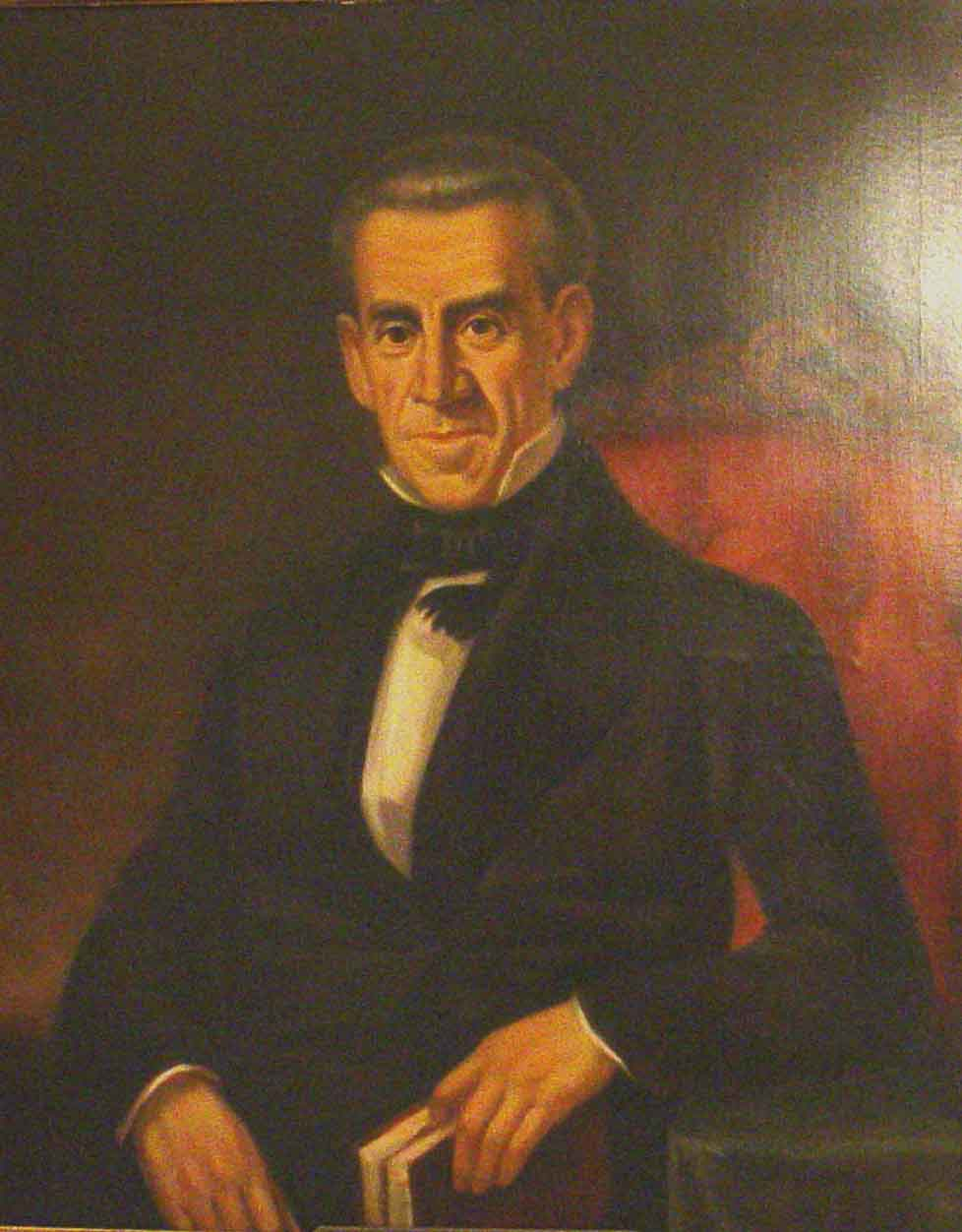

United States Senator from Alabama
- In office June 19, 1837 – November 15, 1841
- Preceded by: John McKinley
- Succeeded by: Arthur P. Bagby

8th Governor of Alabama
- In office November 21, 1835 – July 17, 1837
- Preceded by: John Gayle
- Succeeded by: Hugh McVay

Member of the U.S. House of Representatives from Alabama's 1st district
- In office March 4, 1829 – March 3, 1835
- Preceded by: Gabriel Moore
- Succeeded by: Reuben Chapman

Member of the Alabama House of Representatives
- In office 1827–1828

Personal details
- Born: December 17, 1789 Halifax County, Virginia, US
- Died: September 6, 1866 (aged 76) Huntsville, Alabama, US
- Resting place: Maple Hill Cemetery
- Party: Democratic
- Spouse: Susannah Claiborne Withers (m. 1815; died 1866)
- Children: 3, including Clement Claiborne Clay
- Education: East Tennessee University
- Occupation: Politician

Clement Comer Clay (December 17, 1789 – September 6, 1866) was the eighth governor of Alabama from 1835 to 1837. An attorney, judge, and politician, he was elected to the state legislature as well as the U.S. House of Representatives and the United States Senate.

He and his son, who also served as a U.S. senator, were among the Alabama’s most prominent enslavers, according to the Washington Post. Together the two men enslaved 87 people on four Alabama plantations as recorded in the 1860 census.

== Early life ==
Clay was born in Halifax County, Virginia, the son of Rebecca (Comer) and William Clay, an officer in the American Revolutionary War, who moved to Grainger County, Tennessee. Clay attended the local schools and graduated from East Tennessee College in 1807.

== Early career ==
Admitted to the Tennessee bar in 1809, he soon moved to Huntsville, Alabama, where he participated in wars with the Creek Native Americans, then began a law practice in 1811.

== Alabama House of Representatives ==
Clay served in the Alabama Territorial Legislature from 1817 to 1818. He was a state court judge and served in the Alabama House of Representatives.

In 1828, he was elected to the U.S. House of Representatives, serving from March 4, 1829, and through re-elections until March 3, 1835, when he started as governor of Alabama.

== Governor of Alabama ==
In 1835 Clay was elected governor. Clay's term as governor ended early when the state legislature appointed him to the United States Senate in 1837 (this was before the popular election of senators).

=== Spring Hill College ===
In 1836, Governor Clay signed a legislative act that chartered Spring Hill College in Mobile, Alabama, the third oldest Jesuit college in the United States. The charter gave it "full power to grant or confer such degree or degrees in the arts and sciences, or in any art or science as are usually granted or conferred by other seminaries of learning in the United States." The college resulted from the strong French Catholic traditions in the city, founded as a French colony.

=== Creek War of 1836 ===
Clay's term in office was dominated by the Creek War of 1836 arising from resistance to Indian Removal, which had taken place in the Southeast since 1830. During Clay's administration, the United States Army removed the Creek Indians from Southeastern Alabama under the terms of the 1832 Treaty of Cusseta. The Creek were relocated to the Indian Territory (now Oklahoma) west of the Mississippi. Confrontations between Indians and white settlers occurred.

=== Panic of 1837 ===
During the Panic of 1837, the United States suffered a financial crisis brought on by speculative fever. This crisis caused a run on the Bank of the State of Alabama. Clay ordered the bank to provide a detailed financial report, but it could not do so.

=== Slave holder ===
Clay arrived in 1811 to Huntsville owning very little money and one slave. By 1830 he enslaved 52 people and in 1834, 71. From 1840 – 1850, he sold many of those people in order to meet his debts. But by 1860 he claimed ownership of 84 enslaved people.

== United States Senate ==
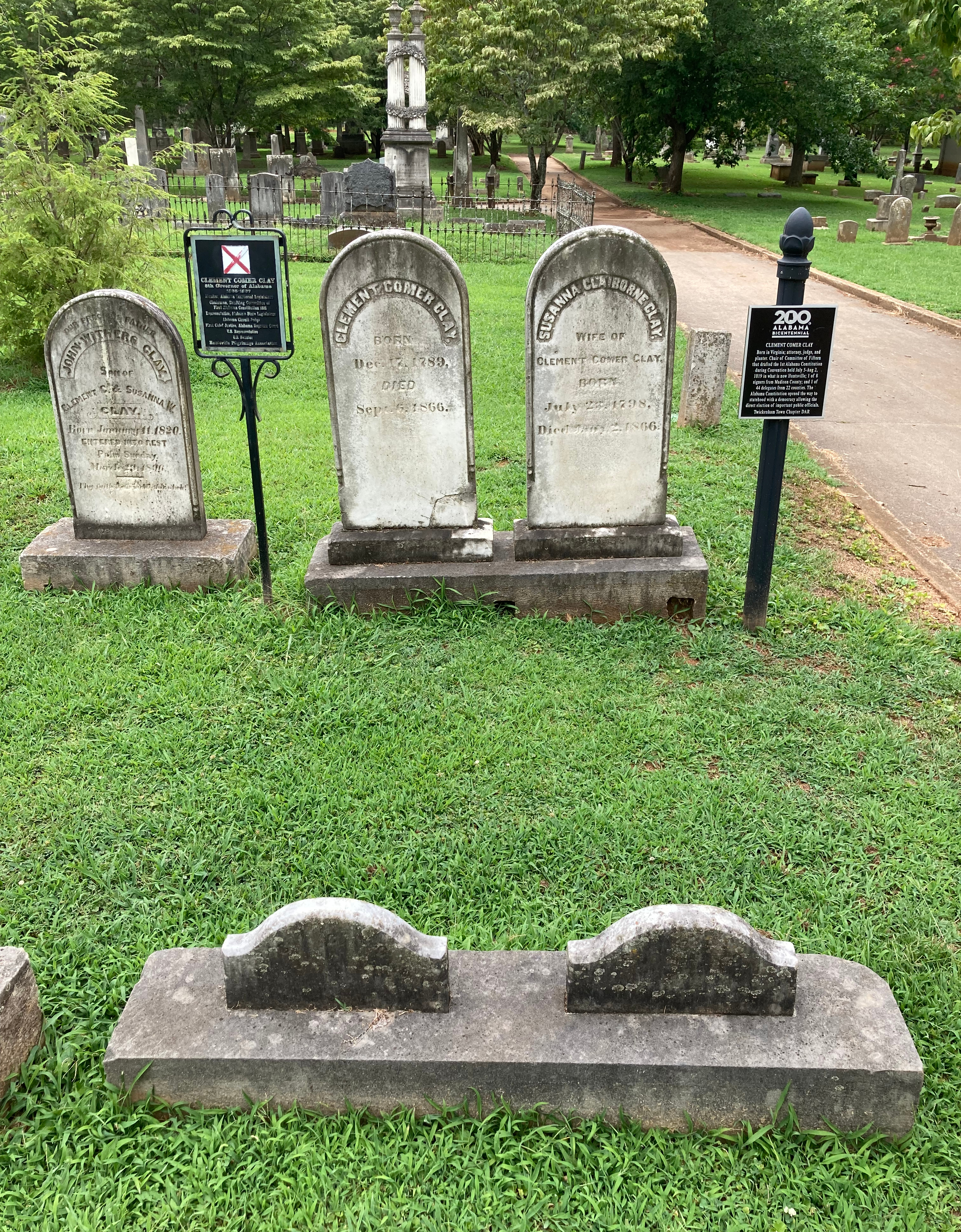
Clay's grave at Maple Hill Cemetery

After the election by the state legislature, Clay served in the United States Senate from June 19, 1837, until his resignation on November 15, 1841.

== Marriage and family ==
Clay married Susannah Claiborne Withers on April 4, 1815. They had three sons: Clement Claiborne Clay, John Withers Clay, and Hugh Lawson Clay.

== Death ==
In the year after the end of the Civil War, Clement died of natural causes in September 1866, aged 76. His wife Susanna had died earlier the same year. They were buried at Maple Hill Cemetery in Huntsville.

== Notes ==
Party political offices
Preceded by John Gayle	Democratic nominee for Governor of Alabama; 1835	Succeeded by Arthur P. Bagby
Legal offices
New title	Chief Justice of the Supreme Court of Alabama; 1820–1823	Succeeded by Abner Smith Lipscomb
U.S. House of Representatives
Preceded by Gabriel Moore	Member of the U.S. House of Representatives from Alabama's 1st congressional district March 4, 1829 – March 4, 1835	Succeeded by Reuben Chapman
Political offices
Preceded by John Gayle	Governor of Alabama; 1835–1837	Succeeded by Hugh McVay
U.S. Senate
Preceded by John McKinley	United States Senator from Alabama (Class 3); 1837–1841 with William R. King (1837–1841)	Succeeded by Arthur P. Bagby
