= 1886 Alabama gubernatorial election =

- August 2, 1886
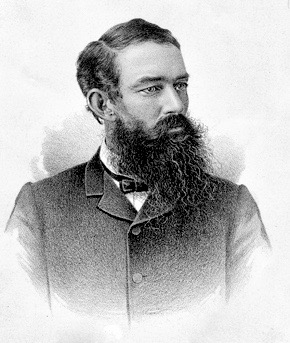

Nominee	Thomas Seay	Arthur Bingham
Party	Democratic	Republican
Popular vote	145,095	36,793
Percentage	79.43%	20.14%
- County results Seay: 50–60% 60–70% 70–80% 80–90% >90% Bingham: 50–60% 60–70% 70–80% No Data
Governor before election
Edward A. O'Neal
Democratic
Elected Governor
Thomas Seay
Democratic

The 1886 Alabama gubernatorial election took place on August 2, 1886, in order to elect the governor of Alabama.

== Results ==
1886 Alabama gubernatorial election
Party	Candidate	Votes	%
Democratic	Thomas Seay	145,095	79.43
Republican	Arthur Bingham	36,793	20.14
Prohibition	John T. Tanner	576	0.32
Other	Write-ins	204	0.11
Total votes		182,668	100.00
Democratic hold			
