= 1829 Alabama gubernatorial election =

- August 3, 1829
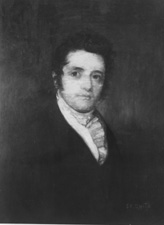
| Nominee | Gabriel Moore |
| Party | Jacksonian |
| Popular vote | 10,956 |
| Percentage | 100.00% |
- County results Moore: >90% Unknown/No Vote
Governor before election
John Murphy
Jacksonian
Elected Governor
Gabriel Moore
Jacksonian

The 1829 Alabama gubernatorial election was an uncontested election held on August 3, 1829, to elect the governor of Alabama. Jacksonian candidate Gabriel Moore ran unopposed and so won 100% of the vote.

== General election ==
=== Candidates ===
- Gabriel Moore, member of the U.S. House of Representatives for Alabama from 1821 to 1829.

=== Results ===
For reasons unknown only two counties (Conecuh and Dallas) returned results. The statewide results come from the House Journal.

1829 Alabama gubernatorial election
| Party | Candidate | Votes | % | ±% |
|---|---|---|---|---|
| Jacksonian | Gabriel Moore | 10,956 | 100% | +0.75% |
| Total votes | | 10,956 | 100% | N/A |
| Jacksonian hold | | | | |
