= 1843 Alabama gubernatorial election =

- August 7, 1843
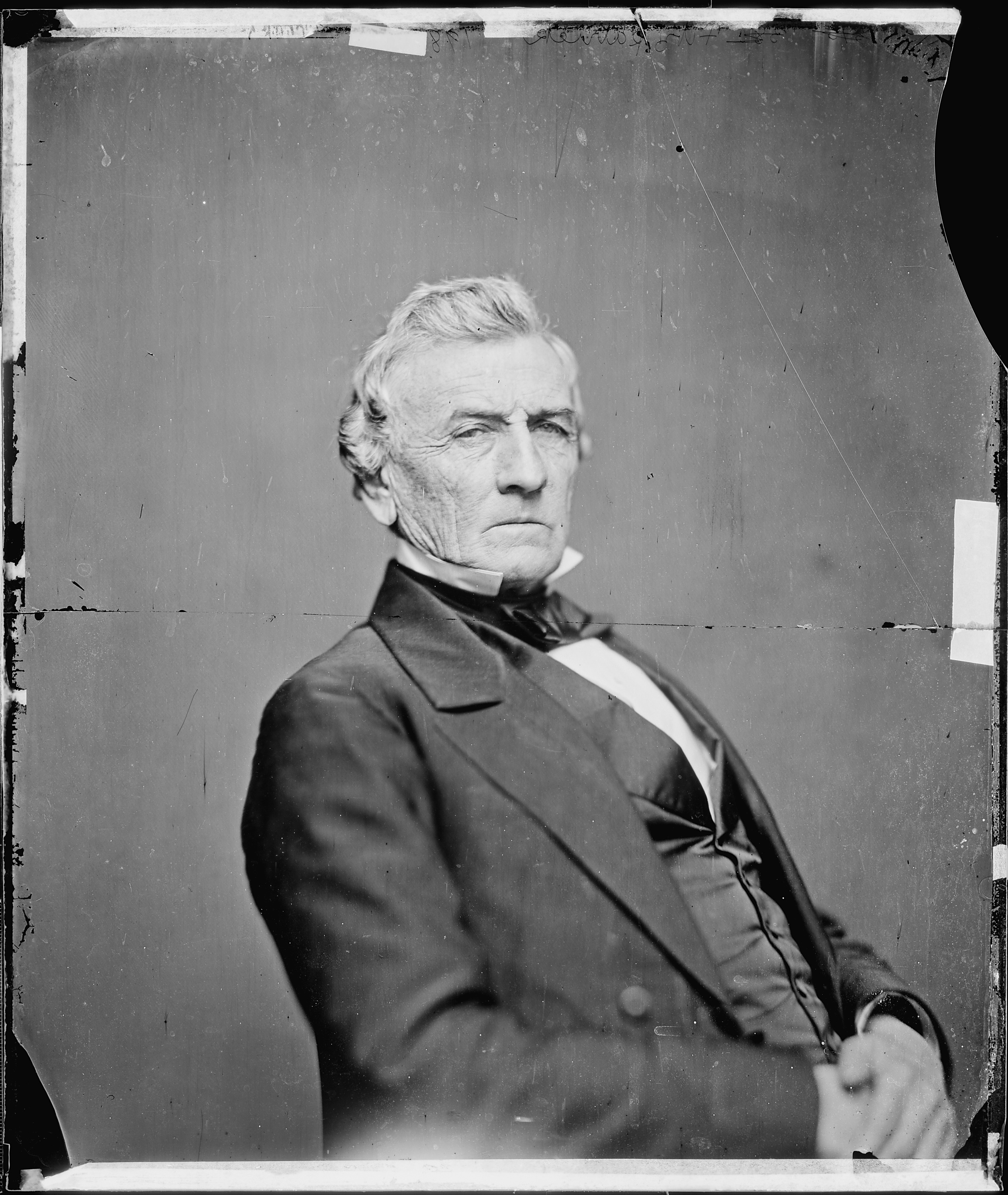
Nominee	Benjamin Fitzpatrick
Party	Democratic
Popular vote	Unknown
Percentage	100.00%
Governor before election
Benjamin Fitzpatrick
Democratic
Elected Governor
Benjamin Fitzpatrick
Democratic

The 1843 Alabama gubernatorial election was held on August 7, 1843, in order to elect the Governor of Alabama. Incumbent Democratic Governor of Alabama Benjamin Fitzpatrick won re-election as he ran unopposed. He won 100% of the vote.

== General election ==
On election day, August 7, 1843, Democratic nominee Benjamin Fitzpatrick easily won re-election as he ran unopposed. Fitzpatrick was sworn in for his 2nd term on December 1, 1843.

=== Results ===
Alabama gubernatorial election, 1843
Party	Candidate	Votes	%	±%
Democratic	Benjamin Fitzpatrick (incumbent)	Unknown	100%	+43.13%
Total votes		Unknown	100%	N/A
Democratic hold				
