= 1890 Alabama gubernatorial election =

- August 4, 1890
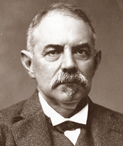

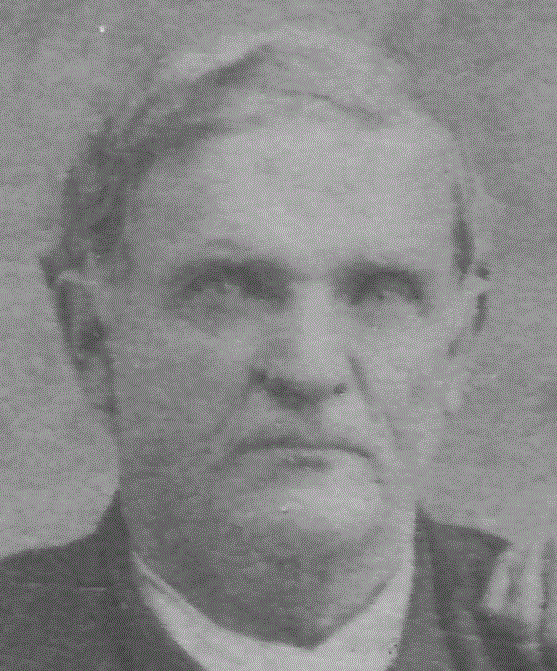
Nominee	Thomas G. Jones	Benjamin M. Long
Party	Democratic	Republican
Popular vote	139,912	42,391
Percentage	76.12%	23.06%
- County results Jones: 50–60% 60–70% 70–80% 80–90% >90% Long: 40–50% 50–60%
Governor before election
Thomas Seay
Democratic
Elected Governor
Thomas G. Jones
Democratic

The 1890 Alabama gubernatorial election took place on August 4, 1890, in order to elect the governor of Alabama.

== Results ==
1890 Alabama gubernatorial election
Party	Candidate	Votes	%
Democratic	Thomas G. Jones	139,912	76.12
Republican	Benjamin M. Long	42,391	23.06
Prohibition	L. C. Coulson	1,385	0.75
Other	Write-ins	109	0.06
Total votes		183,797	100.00
Democratic hold			
