= 1819 Alabama gubernatorial election =

- September 20–21, 1819
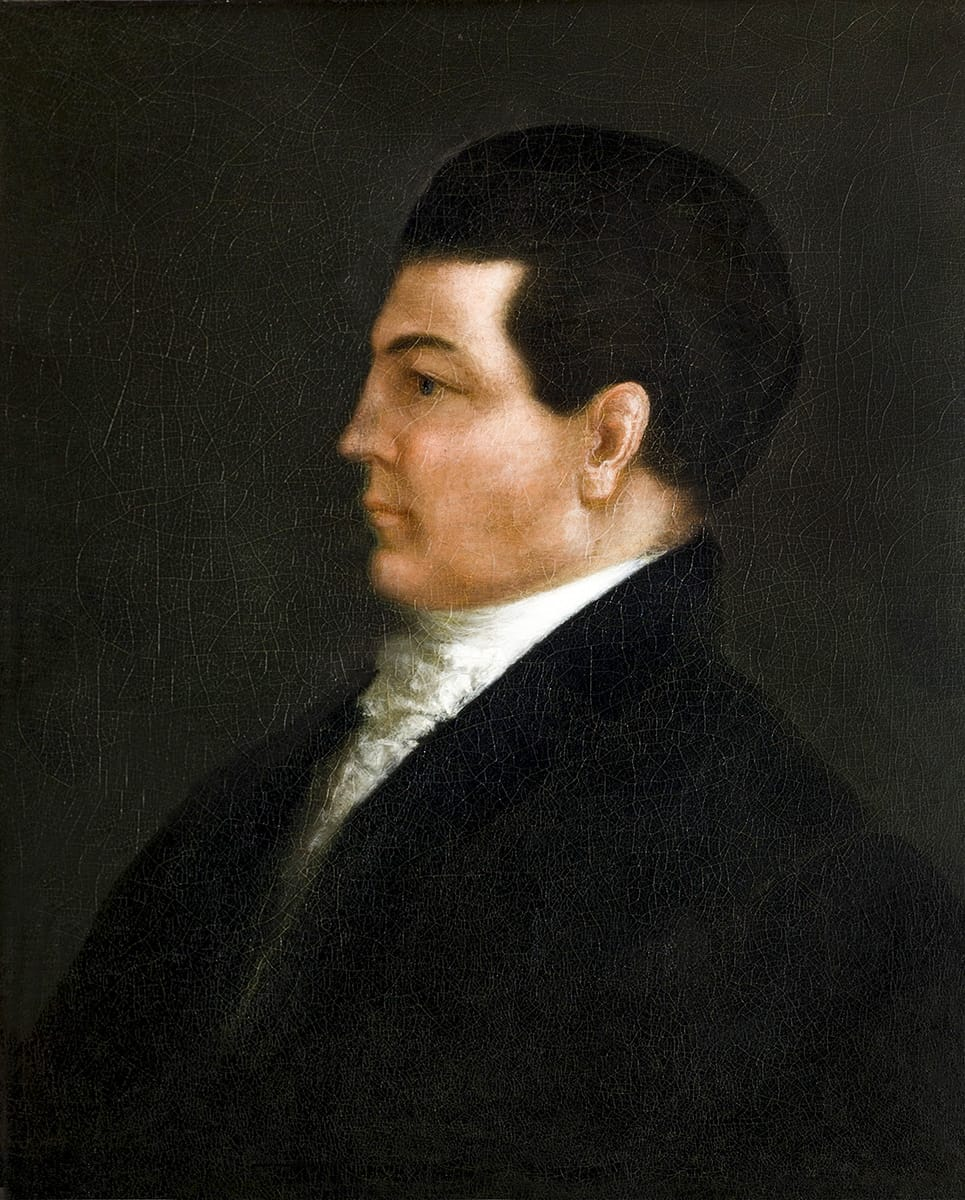

Nominee	William W. Bibb	Marmaduke Williams
Party	Democratic-Republican	Democratic-Republican
Popular vote	8,321	7,140
Percentage	53.82%	46.18%
- County results Bibb: 50–60% 60–70% 70–80% 80–90% >90% Williams: 50–60% 60–70% 70–80% 80–90% Unknown/No Vote
Elected Governor
William W. Bibb
Democratic-Republican

The 1819 Alabama gubernatorial election was held on September 20–21, 1819, to elect the first governor of Alabama. Democratic-Republican candidate William Wyatt Bibb defeated fellow Democratic-Republican candidate Marmaduke Williams with 53.82% of the vote. The debate over where Alabama's permanent capital should be was reportedly an important issue in the race - Williams supported Tuscaloosa while Bibb proposed Cahawba. After the election, Cahawba was made capital, but it was moved to Tuscaloosa in 1825.

== General election ==
=== Candidates ===
- William Wyatt Bibb, Governor of the Territory of Alabama
- Marmaduke Williams, Delegate to the Alabama Constitutional Convention and Senator for North Carolina 1803–09

=== Results ===
1819 Alabama gubernatorial election
Party	Candidate	Votes	%	±%
Democratic-Republican	William Wyatt Bibb	8,321	53.82%	N/A
Democratic-Republican	Marmaduke Williams	7,140	46.18%	N/A
Total votes		15,461	100%	N/A

==== By county ====
County	William W. Bibb Democratic-Republican		Marmaduke Williams Democratic-Republican		Total votes
County	#	%	#	%	Total votes
Autauga	440	98.7%	6	1.3%	446
Baldwin	126	92.0%	11	8.0%	137
Blount	111	13.3%	722	86.7%	833
Cahawba	335	82.1%	73	17.9%	408
Clarke	543	66.5%	274	33.5%	817
Conecuh	460	92.2%	39	7.8%	499
Cotaco	195	30.0%	454	70.0%	649
Dallas	647	84.9%	115	15.1%	762
Franklin	161	29.4%	387	70.6%	548
Lauderdale	142	28.6%	355	71.4%	497
Lawrence	493	62.4%	297	37.6%	790
Limestone	906	82.2%	196	17.8%	1,102
Madison	1,225	49.6%	1,244	50.4%	2,469
Marengo	184	31.2%	405	68.8%	589
Mobile	172	83.9%	33	16.1%	205
Monroe	650	54.9%	534	45.1%	1,184
Montgomery	440	55.7%	350	44.3%	790
St. Clair	350	66.3%	178	33.7%	528
Shelby	278	74.3%	96	25.7%	374
Tuscaloosa	123	13.0%	824	87.0%	947
Washington	257	44.4%	322	55.6%	579
Totals	8,321	53.8%	7,140	46.2%	15,461
