= 1833 Alabama gubernatorial election =

- August 5, 1833
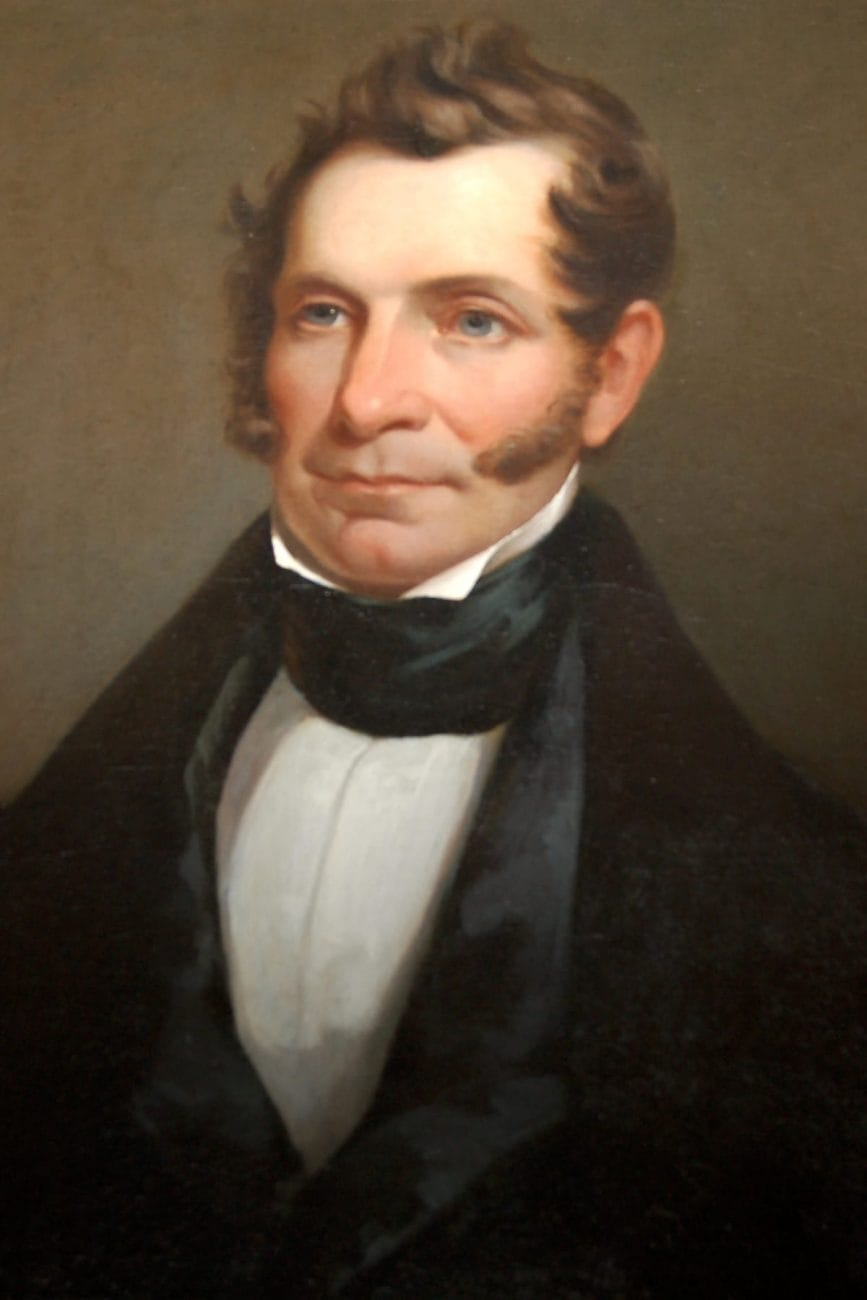
Nominee	John Gayle
Party	Democratic
Popular vote	9,750
Percentage	100.00%
Governor before election
John Gayle
Jacksonian
Elected Governor
John Gayle
Democratic

The 1833 Alabama gubernatorial election was an uncontested election held on August 5, 1833, to elect the governor of Alabama. Democratic candidate John Gayle stood unopposed and so was elected with 100% of the vote.

== General election ==
=== Candidates ===
- John Gayle, incumbent Governor since 1831.

=== Results ===
For reasons unknown no individual county results have not been located by modern historians.

1833 Alabama gubernatorial election
Party	Candidate	Votes	%	±%
Democratic	John Gayle (incumbent)	9,750	100%	+44.99%
Total votes		9,750	100%	N/A
Democratic gain from Jacksonian				
