= 1884 Alabama gubernatorial election =

- August 4, 1884
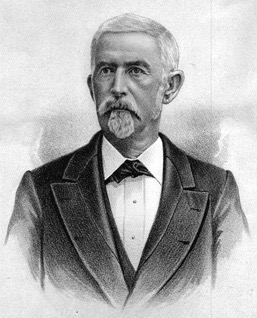
Nominee	Edward A. O'Neal
Party	Democratic
Popular vote	143,229
Percentage	99.71%
- County results O'Neal: >90% No Data
Governor before election
Edward A. O'Neal
Democratic
Elected Governor
Edward A. O'Neal
Democratic

The 1884 Alabama gubernatorial election took place on August 4, 1884, in order to elect the governor of Alabama. Incumbent Democrat Edward A. O'Neal ran unopposed.

== Results ==
1884 Alabama gubernatorial election
Party	Candidate	Votes	%
Democratic	Edward A. O'Neal (incumbent)	143,229	99.71
Other	Write-ins	415	0.29
Total votes		143,644	100.00
Democratic hold			
