= 1876 Alabama gubernatorial election =

- August 7, 1876
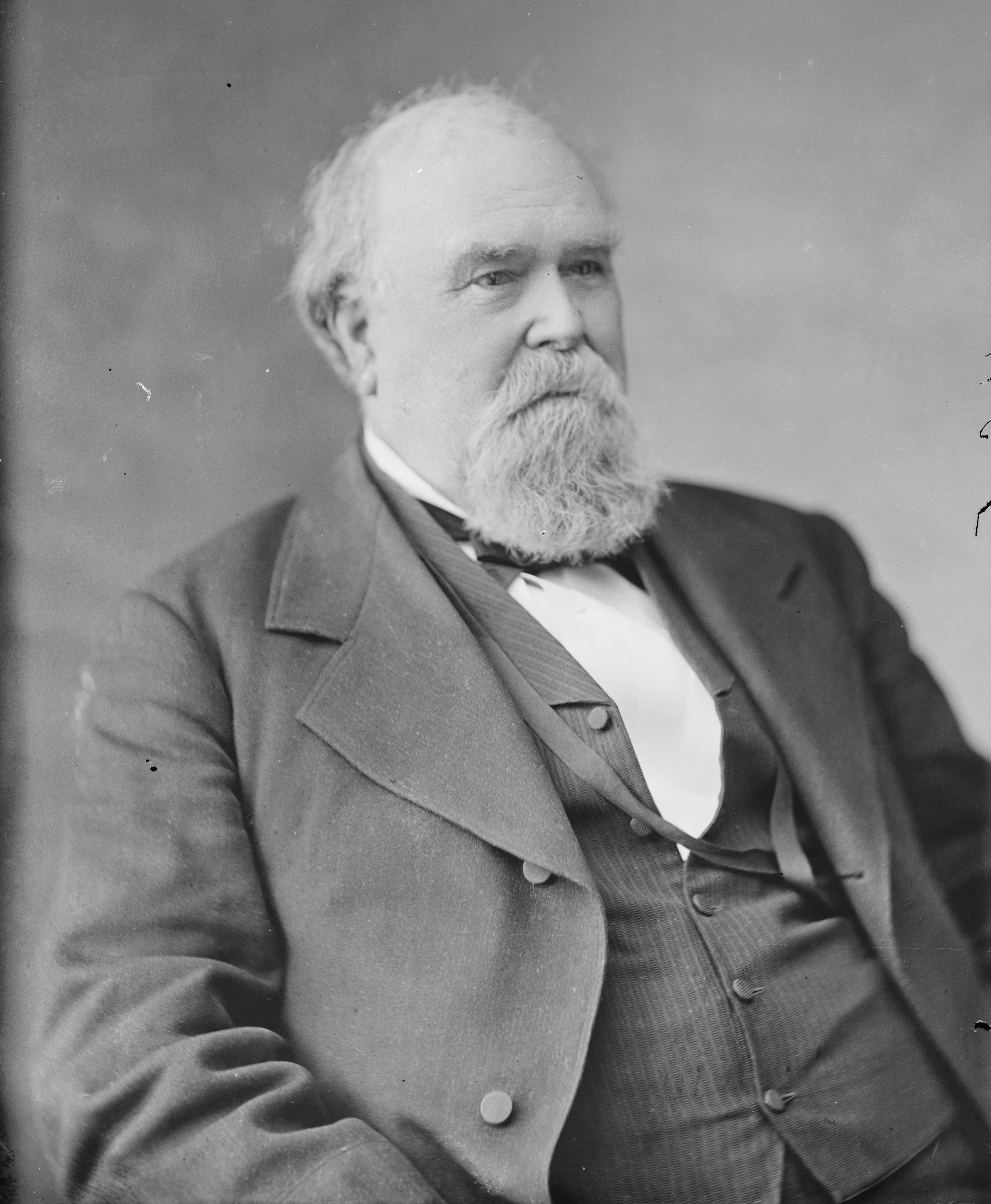

Nominee	George S. Houston	Noadiah Woodruff
Party	Democratic	Republican
Popular vote	107,118	55,682
Percentage	65.80%	34.20%
- County results Houston: 50–60% 60–70% 70–80% 80–90% >90% Woodruff: 50–60% 60–70% 70–80%
Governor before election
George S. Houston
Democratic
Elected Governor
George S. Houston
Democratic

The 1876 Alabama gubernatorial election took place on August 7, 1876, in order to elect the governor of Alabama. Incumbent Democrat George S. Houston ran for reelection to a second term.

== Results ==
1876 Alabama gubernatorial election
Party	Candidate	Votes	%
Democratic	George S. Houston (incumbent)	107,118	65.80
Republican	Noadiah Woodruff	55,682	34.20
Total votes		162,800	100.00
Democratic hold			
