= 1882 Alabama gubernatorial election =

- August 7, 1882
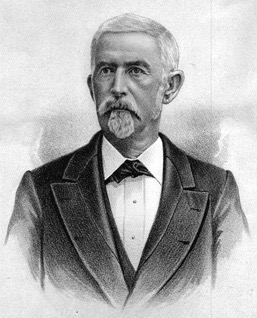

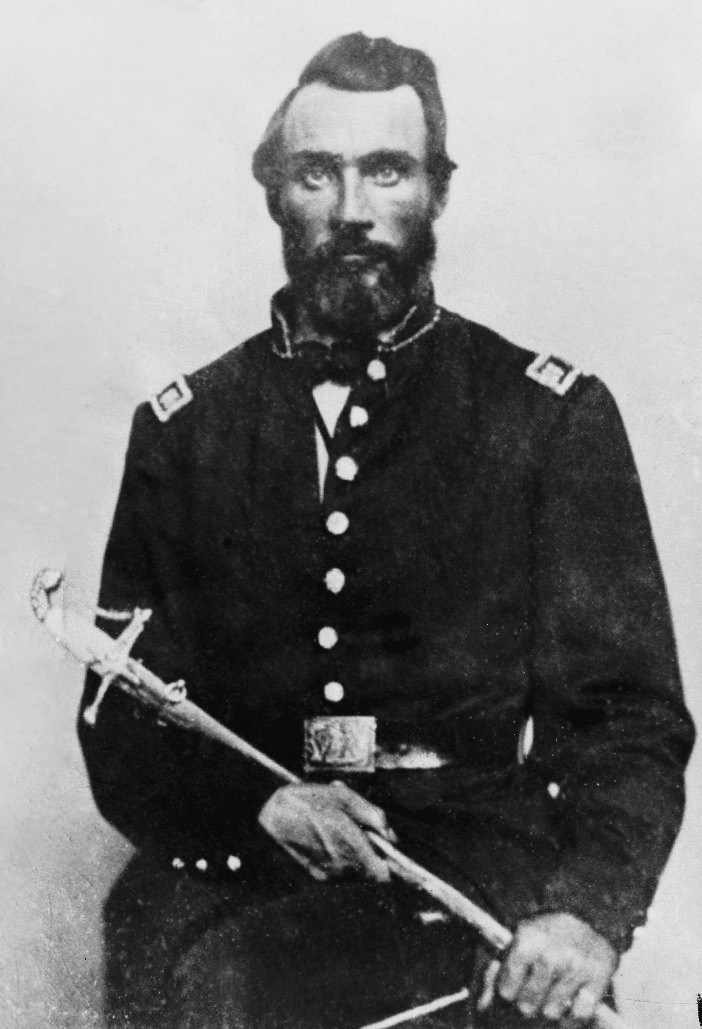
Nominee	Edward A. O'Neal	James L. Sheffield
Party	Democratic	Republican
Popular vote	102,617	46,742
Percentage	68.70%	31.30%
- County results O'Neal: 50–60% 60–70% 70–80% 80–90% >90% Sheffield: 50–60% 60–70%
Governor before election
Rufus W. Cobb
Democratic
Elected Governor
Edward A. O'Neal
Democratic

The 1882 Alabama gubernatorial election took place on August 7, 1882, in order to elect the governor of Alabama.

== Results ==
1882 Alabama gubernatorial election
Party	Candidate	Votes	%
Democratic	Edward A. O'Neal	102,617	68.70
Republican	James L. Sheffield	46,742	31.30
Other	Write-ins	2	>0.01
Total votes		149,361	100.00
Democratic hold			
