= Edward A. O'Neal =

American politician (1818–1890)

Edward Asbury O'Neal
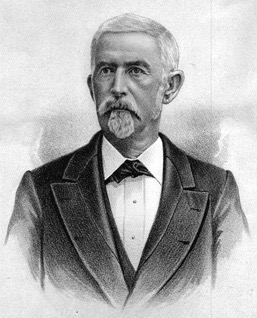

26th Governor of Alabama
- In office December 1, 1882 – December 1, 1886
- Preceded by: Rufus W. Cobb
- Succeeded by: Thomas Seay

Personal details
- Born: September 20, 1818 Madison County, Alabama, US
- Died: November 7, 1890 (aged 72) Florence, Alabama, US
- Resting place: Florence Cemetery, Florence, Alabama, US
- Party: Democratic

Military service
- Allegiance: Confederate States of America
- Branch/service: Confederate States Army
- Rank: Colonel
- Unit: 9th Regiment Alabama Infantry
- Commands: 26th Alabama Infantry
- Battles/wars: American Civil War

Edward Asbury O'Neal (September 20, 1818 – November 7, 1890) was a Confederate officer during the American Civil War and the 26th governor of Alabama.

== Early life and career ==
O'Neal was born in Madison County, Alabama, to Edward and Rebecca Wheat O'Neal. His father was a native of Ireland, and his mother was a South Carolinian of French Huguenot ancestry. O'Neal's father died when his son was three months old. After receiving an academic education, including English literature and the classics, O'Neal graduated from LaGrange College (the predecessor of the University of North Alabama) in 1836 at the top of his class with a bachelor of arts. In 1838, he married Olivia Moore, the daughter of Dr. Alfred Moore, and they had nine children. O'Neal studied law with James W. McClung and was admitted to the bar in 1840.

In 1841 O'Neal was elected to Alabama's fourth judicial circuit to fill out an unexpired term and served four years. He strongly believed in secession and advocated that Alabama should secede from the United States during the secession crisis of 1860.

== Civil War ==
In June 1861, O'Neal was commissioned as a captain and commanded three companies of soldiers. Upon reaching Richmond, he was appointed major of the 9th Regiment Alabama Infantry and was promoted to lieutenant colonel in the fall. In March 1862, he was appointed colonel of the 26th Alabama infantry; he commanded this regiment during the Peninsula Campaign. At the Battle of Seven Pines, his horse was killed under him, and a shell fragment severely wounded him. He received high praise for his performance at the Battle of Chancellorsville.

In 1863, he commanded a brigade in Maj. Gen. Robert E. Rodes's division, and led it at the Battle of Gettysburg. General Robert E. Lee became displeased with O'Neal's performance at Gettysburg and relieved him of command, putting Cullen A. Battle in his place. O'Neal returned to command of the 46th Alabama for the Bristoe Campaign and the Mine Run Campaign in the autumn and early winter.

Early in 1864, his regiment was sent back to Alabama to recruit its depleted ranks but was quickly ordered to Dalton, Georgia, where O'Neal took command of Brig. Gen. James Cantey's brigade in the Army of Tennessee. O'Neal commanded this brigade during the remainder of the Atlanta campaign. After Lt. Gen. John Bell Hood was given command of the Army of Tennessee, O'Neal was relieved and served on detached duty for the remainder of the war. He was appointed brigadier general on June 6, 1863. However, this appointment was held up by Gen. Robert E. Lee. The promotion was canceled by Confederate President Jefferson Davis.

== Postbellum career ==
After the war, O'Neal resumed his law career. In August 1875, he was elected to the Alabama Constitutional Convention and served in that convention as chairman of the Committee on Education. In 1880, O'Neal was an elector on the Winfield Scott Hancock campaign for president and made speeches throughout the state advocating Hancock's election. O'Neal served as the Democratic governor of Alabama from 1882 to 1886.

== Death and legacy ==
O'Neal died in Florence, Alabama. His son, Emmet O'Neal, followed in his footsteps and served two terms as Governor of Alabama from 1911 to 1915. The O'Neal Bridge, spanning the Tennessee River between Florence and Sheffield, Alabama, is named in his honor.

== See also ==
- List of American Civil War Generals (Acting Confederate)

== Bibliography ==
- Brown, William Garrott, and Albert James Pickett. A History of Alabama, for Use in Schools: Based as to Its Earlier Parts on the Work of Albert J. Pickett. New York: University Publishing Co., 1900. OCLC 654938664.
- Eicher, John H., and David J. Eicher, Civil War High Commands. Stanford: Stanford University Press, 2001. ISBN 978-0-8047-3641-1.
- McDonald, William Lindsey. Walk Through the Past - People and Places of Florence and Lauderdale County, Alabama. Killen, AL: Heart of Dixie Publishing, 2003. ISBN 0-9719945-6-0.
- Sifakis, Stewart. Who Was Who in the Civil War. New York: Facts On File, 1988. ISBN 978-0-8160-1055-4.
- Warner, Ezra J. (1959). Generals in Gray: Lives of the Confederate Commanders (1st ed.). Baton Rouge: Louisiana State University Press. OCLC 445052.
- White, J. T. National Cyclopaedia of American Biography. New York: J. T. White, 1900.
- National Governors Association biography

Party political offices
Preceded by Rufus W. Cobb	Democratic nominee for Governor of Alabama; 1882, 1884	Succeeded by Thomas Seay
Political offices
Preceded by Rufus W. Cobb	Governor of Alabama; 1882–1886	Succeeded by Thomas Seay
