= John Gayle (Alabama politician) =

American judge (1792–1859)

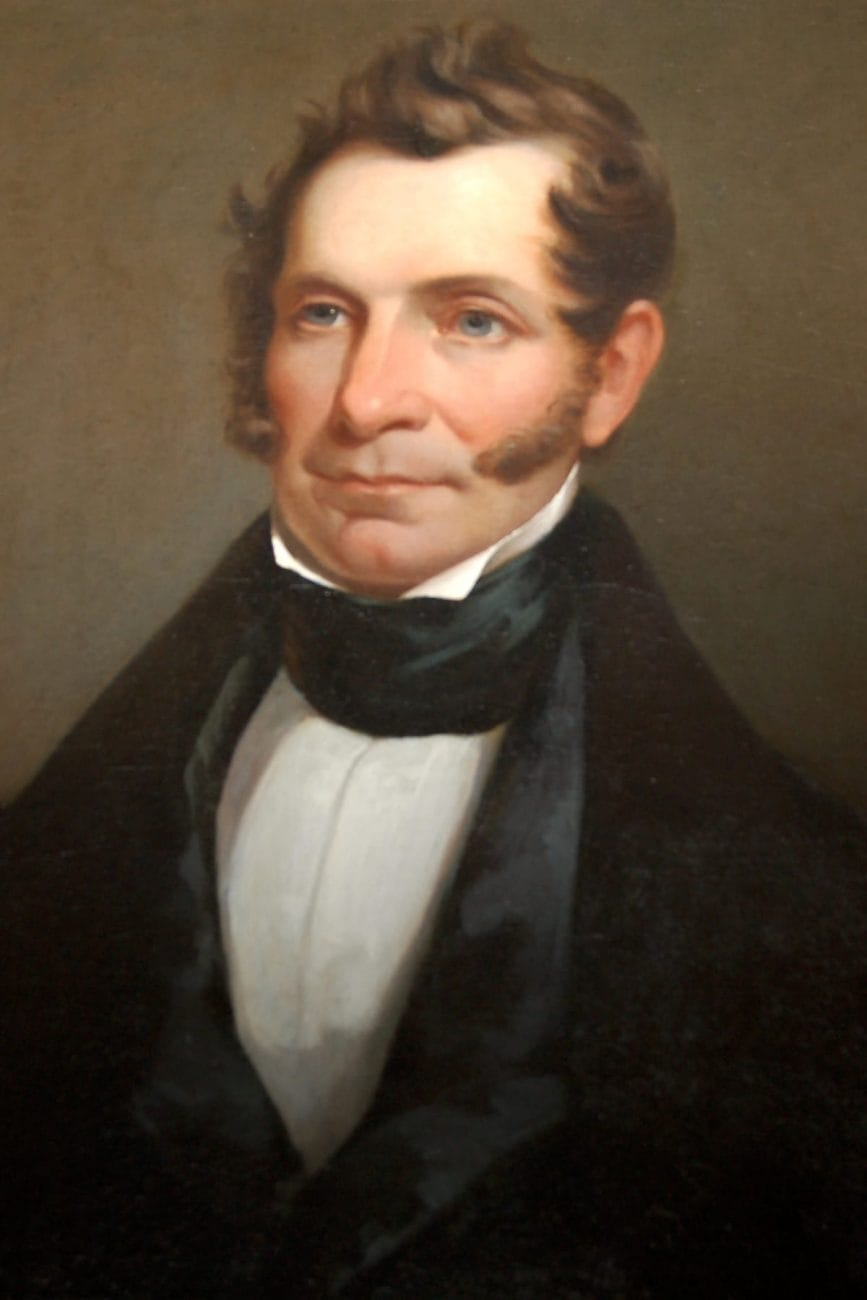

Judge of the United States District Court for the Middle District of Alabama Judge of the United States District Court for the Northern District of Alabama Judge of the United States District Court for the Southern District of Alabama
- In office March 13, 1849 – July 21, 1859
- Appointed by: Zachary Taylor
- Preceded by: William Crawford
- Succeeded by: William Giles Jones

Member of the U.S. House of Representatives from Alabama's 1st district
- In office March 4, 1847 – March 3, 1849
- Preceded by: Edmund Strother Dargan
- Succeeded by: William J. Alston

7th Governor of Alabama
- In office November 26, 1831 – November 21, 1835
- Preceded by: Samuel B. Moore
- Succeeded by: Clement Comer Clay

Personal details
- Born: John Gayle; September 11, 1792 Sumter County, South Carolina
- Died: July 21, 1859 (aged 66) Jacksonville, Alabama
- Resting place: Magnolia Cemetery (Mobile, Alabama)
- Party: Whig
- Education: University of South Carolina read law

John Gayle (September 11, 1792 – July 21, 1859) was the seventh governor of Alabama, a United States representative from Alabama, a justice of the Supreme Court of Alabama and a United States district judge of the United States District Court for the Middle District of Alabama, the United States District Court for the Northern District of Alabama and the United States District Court for the Southern District of Alabama.

== Education and career ==
Born on September 11, 1792, in Sumter County, South Carolina, Gayle pursued classical studies and graduated from South Carolina College (now the University of South Carolina) in 1813 and read law in 1818. He was President of the Clariosophic Society while at South Carolina College. He was admitted to the bar and entered private practice in St. Stephens, Alabama Territory (State of Alabama from December 14, 1819) starting in 1818. He was a member of the Legislative Council for Alabama Territory from 1818 to 1819. He was a solicitor for the First Judicial Circuit of Alabama from 1819 to 1821. He was a member of the Alabama House of Representatives from 1822 to 1823, and again from 1829 to 1830, serving as Speaker in 1829. He was a Judge of the Alabama Circuit Court for the Third Judicial Circuit from 1823 to 1825. He resumed private practice in Greene County, Alabama from 1826 to 1828. He was a justice of the Supreme Court of Alabama from 1828 to 1829. He was Governor of Alabama from 1831 to 1835. He again resumed private practice in Mobile, Alabama from 1835 to 1846. Gayle was mentioned in American Slavery As It Is, an abolitionist book published in 1839. He is given as an example of slavers who disregard marriages of enslaved African Americans. The book reprints a signed advertisement Gayle had placed in a newspaper seeking help capturing an escaped man and suggesting the fugitive could be heading to a neighboring county where the enslaved man's wife lived.

=== Notable state court case ===
During his service as a judge, Gayle presided over the Petition for Freedom of Cornelius Sinclair, a young African American child who had been kidnapped and sold into slavery in Tuscaloosa, Alabama.

=== Notable achievements as Governor ===
During Gayle's term as Governor of Alabama, the state bank was expanded, and the first railroad was completed in Alabama. The Bell Factory, the state's first textile mill, was incorporated in Madison County.

== Congressional service ==
Gayle was elected as a Whig from Alabama's 1st congressional district to the United States House of Representatives of the 30th United States Congress, serving from March 4, 1847, to March 3, 1849. He was Chairman of the Committee on Private Land Claims for the 30th United States Congress.

== Federal judicial service ==
Gayle was nominated by President Zachary Taylor on March 12, 1849, to a joint seat on the United States District Court for the Middle District of Alabama, the United States District Court for the Northern District of Alabama and the United States District Court for the Southern District of Alabama vacated by Judge William Crawford. He was confirmed by the United States Senate on March 13, 1849, and received his commission the same day. His service terminated on July 21, 1859, due to his death in Jacksonville, Alabama. He was interred in Magnolia Cemetery in Mobile.

== Family ==
Gayle was married to Sarah Ann Haynsworth, formerly a resident of South Carolina, from June 11, 1819, until she died in 1835, due to lockjaw (tetanus). They had six children. In 1837, Gayle married Clarissa Stedman Peck at Gaston, Alabama. They had four children. Gayle died of ill health and natural causes on July 21, 1859, aged 66.

During his time on Alabama Supreme Court (1828–29), John Gayle constructed his family home in Greensboro, Alabama, then a part of Greene County, now part of Hale County. There Sarah gave birth to Amelia Gayle Gorgas. She was the wife of Gen. Josiah Gorgas, Chief of Ordnance of the Confederate States of America, mother of William Crawford Gorgas, 22nd United States Surgeon General who freed the Panama Canal Zone of yellow fever.

== Sources ==
- United States Congress. "John Gayle (id: G000106)". Biographical Directory of the United States Congress.

Party political offices
First	Democratic nominee for Governor of Alabama; 1831, 1833	Succeeded by Clement Comer Clay
Political offices
Preceded by Samuel B. Moore	Governor of Alabama; 1831–1835	Succeeded by Clement Comer Clay
U.S. House of Representatives
Preceded by Edmund Strother Dargan	Member of the U.S. House of Representatives from Alabama's 1st congressional district 1847–1849	Succeeded by William J. Alston
Legal offices
Preceded by William Crawford	Judge of the United States District Court for the Middle District of Alabama; Judge of the United States District Court for the Northern District of Alabama; Judge of the United States District Court for the Southern District of Alabama; 1849–1859	Succeeded by William Giles Jones
