= John Murphy (Alabama politician) =

Governor of Alabama (1825–1829)

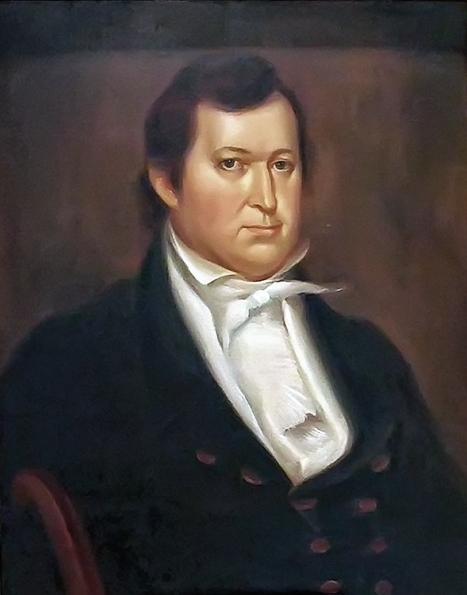

Member of the U.S. House of Representatives from Alabama's 5th district
- In office March 4, 1833 – March 3, 1835
- Preceded by: District created
- Succeeded by: Francis Strother Lyon

4th Governor of Alabama
- In office November 25, 1825 – November 25, 1829
- Preceded by: Israel Pickens
- Succeeded by: Gabriel Moore

Member of the Alabama Senate
- In office 1822

Member of the Alabama House of Representatives
- In office 1820

Personal details
- Born: 1786 Robeson County, North Carolina, U.S.
- Died: September 21, 1841 (aged 54–55) near Gosport, Clarke County, Alabama, U.S.
- Resting place: Murphy Plantation, Gosport, Alabama, U.S.
- Party: Democratic
- Spouse(s): Susannah Richardson Hails; Sarah Darrington Carter
- Education: College of South Carolina

John Murphy (1786 – September 21, 1841) was the fourth governor of Alabama, serving two terms from 1825 to 1829.

== Biography ==
=== Early life ===
John Murphy was born in 1786 in Robeson County, North Carolina.

He attended South Carolina College, now the University of South Carolina, where he was a member of the Clariosophic Society. Among his classmates at South Carolina College were John Gayle and James Dellet. Gayle also became Governor of Alabama while Dellet became a U.S. Congressman from Alabama. Murphy graduated in 1808.

=== Career ===
He became a clerk at the South Carolina Senate from 1810 until 1817. He was a trustee for the University of South Carolina from 1808 to 1818.

In 1818, he moved to Alabama and was elected to the Alabama House in 1820 and the Alabama Senate in 1822. He was elected Governor of Alabama in 1824, and in 1827 he was elected for a second term. He represented Alabama in the United States House of Representatives from 1833 to 1835.

He ran in 1830 for Alabama's 3rd district against incumbent Dixon H. Lewis. Lewis won by 15%. He ran again in 1838.

=== Personal life ===
Murphy was married twice. He married first to Susannah Richardson Hails, in South Carolina, with whom he had several children. He married a second time to Sarah Darrington Carter of Clarke County, Alabama, with whom he had several children, including the politician Duncan Murphy.

He owned a plantation in Alabama.

Under the date of April 2, 1834, John Quincy Adams records in his diary that Congressman James Blair "shot himself last evening at his lodgings ... after reading part of an affectionate letter from his wife, to Governor Murphy, of Alabama, who was alone in the chamber with him, and a fellow-lodger at the same house." Diary (New York: Longmans, Green, 1929) p. 434.

=== Death ===
He died in 1841 in Clarke County, Alabama. Murphy was buried in Gosport.

Political offices
Preceded by Israel Pickens	Governor of Alabama; 1825–1829	Succeeded by Gabriel Moore
U.S. House of Representatives
New district	Member of the U.S. House of Representatives from Alabama's 5th congressional district March 4, 1833 – March 3, 1835	Succeeded by Francis Strother Lyon
