= Joshua L. Martin =

American politician (1799–1856)

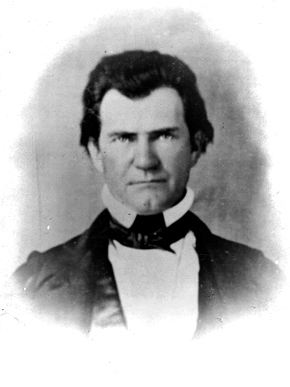

12th Governor of Alabama
- In office December 10, 1845 – December 16, 1847
- Preceded by: Benjamin Fitzpatrick
- Succeeded by: Reuben Chapman

Member of the U.S. House of Representatives from Alabama's 2nd district
- In office March 4, 1835 – March 3, 1839
- Preceded by: John McKinley
- Succeeded by: David Hubbard

Personal details
- Born: December 5, 1799 Blount County, Tennessee, US
- Died: November 2, 1856 (aged 56) Tuscaloosa, Alabama, US
- Resting place: Evergreen Cemetery, Tuscaloosa, Alabama
- Party: Jacksonian, Democratic, Independent

Joshua Lanier Martin (December 5, 1799 – November 2, 1856) was an American politician who served as the 12th governor of Alabama from 1845 to 1847 as an Independent, and is the only Independent Governor in the state's history. He had also served as a representative to the United States Congress for Alabama's 2nd district from 1835 to 1839 as a Democrat.

He was born on December 5, 1799, in Blount County, Tennessee. He taught school during his youth years and studied law in Maryville, Tennessee; then, he moved to Alabama in 1819 to continue his studies. He passed the bar and began legal practice in Athens, Alabama. He was known as an ardent Democrat. Before serving the state of Alabama as its governor, he served as a legislator, solicitor, circuit judge, and congressman. He was first elected to Congress as part of the 24th Congress and a member of the Jacksonian Party. However, he changed parties to the Democratic Party when elected to the 25th Congress. In 1845, he opposed other Democratic leaders and ran as an independent for governor, defeating the mainstream Democratic candidate, and Democrats never forgave him for his action. However, he denied the Whig Party any chance it might have had to win office that year. During his term of office, the state capitol was moved from Tuscaloosa, Alabama to its current location in Montgomery, Alabama. His tenure also saw the United States declare war on the Republic of Mexico. As governor, Martin saw the state bank's dissolution, which he had perceived as crooked. Although he initially ran for reelection in 1847, he later withdrew his name from consideration. After his term as governor, he returned to law practice in Tuscaloosa, Alabama, but did serve one more term in the state legislature in 1853. He never lost an election for public office. Martin died in 1856 in Tuscaloosa, Alabama, at 56.

U.S. House of Representatives
Preceded by John McKinley	Member of the U.S. House of Representatives from Alabama's 2nd congressional district 1835–1839	Succeeded by David Hubbard
Political offices
Preceded by Benjamin Fitzpatrick	Governor of Alabama; 1845–1847	Succeeded by Reuben Chapman
