= 1831 Alabama gubernatorial election =

- August 1, 1831
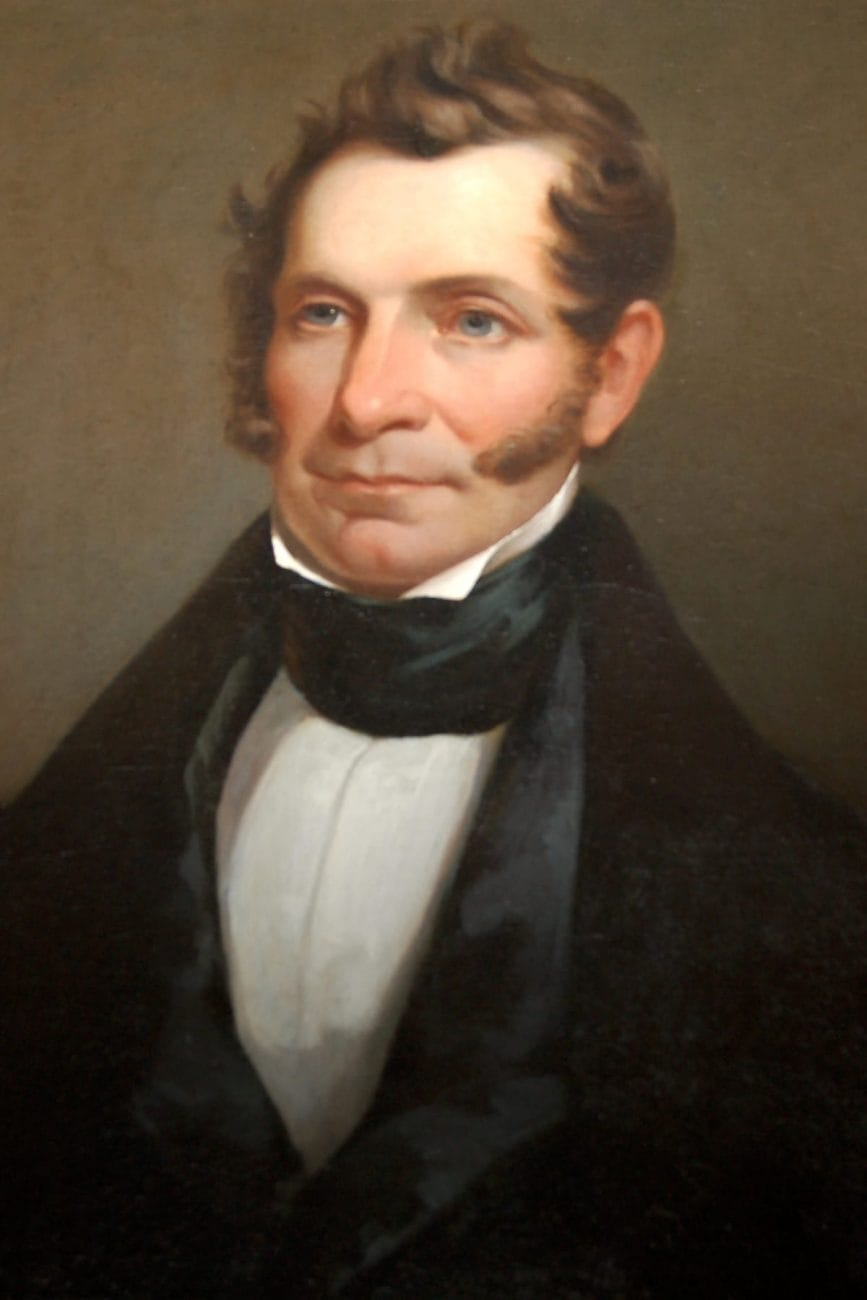

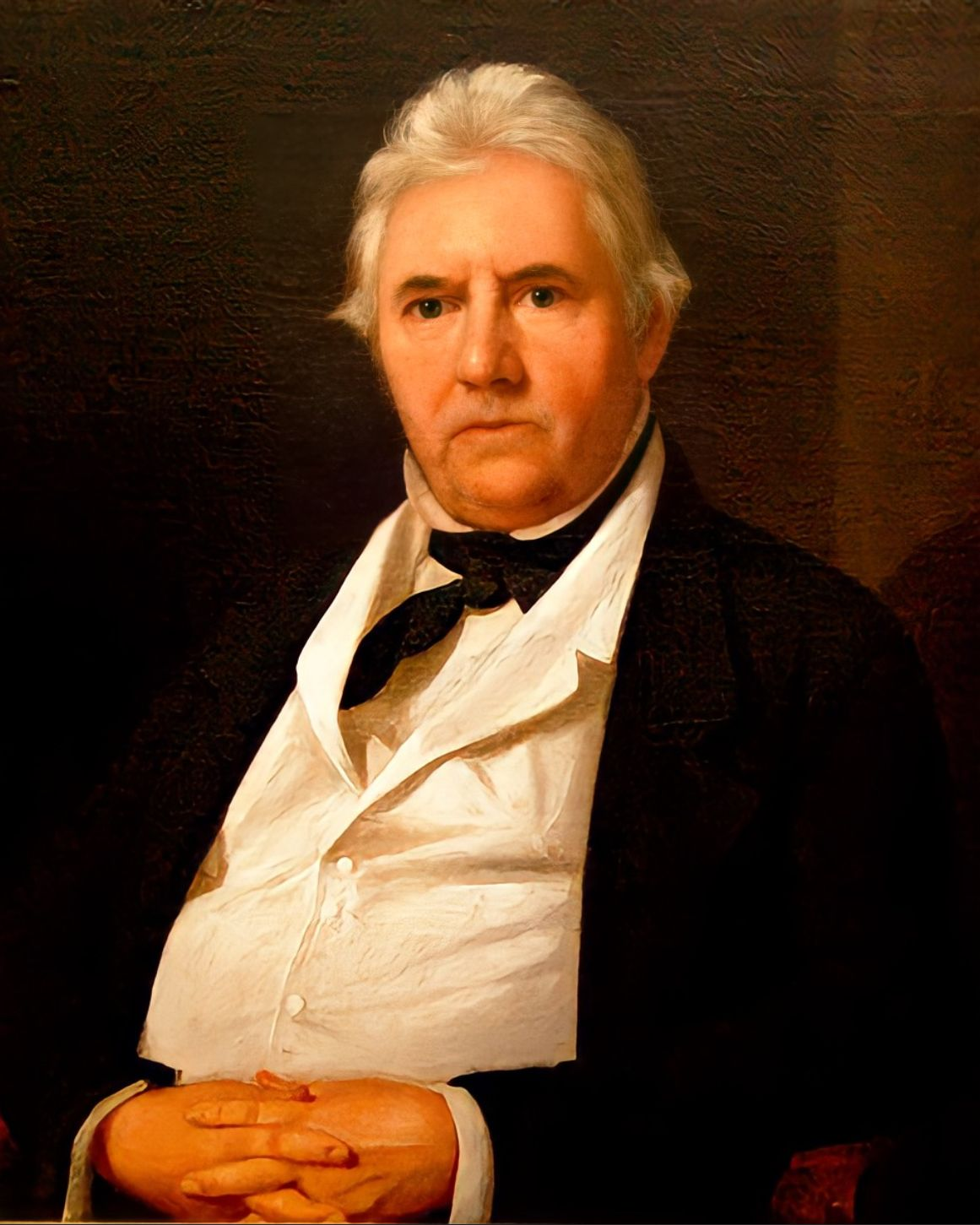

Nominee	John Gayle	Nicholas Davis	Samuel B. Moore
Party	Jacksonian	National Republican	Anti-Jacksonian Democrat
Popular vote	14,403	8,137	3,643
Percentage	55.01%	31.08%	13.91%
- County results Gayle: 50–60% 60–70% 70–80% 80–90% >90% Davis: 30–40% 40–50% 50–60% 60–70% Moore: 30–40% 40–50% 50–60% Unknown/No Vote
Governor before election
Samuel B. Moore
Jacksonian
Elected Governor
John Gayle
Jacksonian

The 1831 Alabama gubernatorial election was an election held on August 1, 1831, to elect the governor of Alabama. Jacksonian candidate John Gayle beat the incumbent Jacksonian governor Samuel B. Moore and National Republican candidate Nicholas Davis with 55.01% of the vote.

== General election ==
=== Candidates ===
- Nicholas Davis, member of the Alabama House of Representatives 1819–1820.
- John Gayle, member of the Alabama House of Representatives 1822–1823 and 1829–1830.
- Samuel B. Moore, governor of Alabama since March 1831.

=== Results ===
1831 Alabama gubernatorial election
Party	Candidate	Votes	%	±%
Jacksonian	John Gayle	14,403	55.01%	−44.99%
National Republican	Nicholas Davis	8,173	31.08%	+31.08%
Anti-Jackson Democrat	Samuel B. Moore (incumbent)	3,643	13.91%	+13.91%
Total votes		26,219	100%	N/A
Jacksonian hold				

==== By county ====
County results (Note: Dubin was unable to locate official returns for Covington, Dale, Henry, Jefferson, Lowndes, Pike, St. Clair, Walker, and Washington counties.)
County	John Gayle Jacksonian		Nicholas Davis National Republican		Samuel B. Moore Anti-Jackson Democrat		Total Votes
County	#	%	#	%	#	%	Total Votes
Autauga	631	56.00%	356	31.60%	139	12.30%	1,126
Baldwin	119	59.80%	77	38.70%	3	1.50%	199
Bibb	595	71.80%	69	8.30%	165	19.90%	829
Blount	371	71.90%	86	16.70%	59	11.40%	516
Butler	254	37.60%	330	48.80%	62	9.20%	646
Clarke	562	82.50%	82	12.00%	37	5.40%	681
Conecuh	449	66.90%	208	3.00%	14	2.10%	671
Covington	--	--	--	--	--	--	--
Dale	--	--	--	--	--	--	--
Fayette	60	15.40%	114	29.30%	215	55.30%	389
Franklin	381	38.50%	555	56.10%	53	5.40%	989
Greene	1,398	90.60%	65	4.20%	80	5.20%	1,543
Henry	--	--	--	--	--	--	--
Jackson	649	36.60%	342	19.30%	780	44.00%	1,771
Jefferson	--	--	--	--	--	--	--
Lauderdale	438	37.60%	703	60.40%	23	2.00%	1,164
Lawrence	617	45.50%	635	46.90%	103	7.60%	1,355
Limestone	449	33.30%	893	62.40%	6	0.40%	1,348
Lowndes	--	--	--	--	--	--	--
Madison	1,535	63.20%	804	33.10%	91	3.70%	2,430
Marengo	743	89.60%	64	6.40%	22	2.70%	829
Marion	161	37.90%	169	39.80%	95	22.40%	425
Mobile	533	70.60%	221	9.30%	1	0.10%	755
Monroe	503	67.20%	237	31.60%	9	1.20%	749
Montgomery	1,020	51.80%	915	28.50%	36	1.80%	1,971
Morgan	481	44.20%	555	51.00%	53	4.90%	1,089
Perry	615	61.70%	182	18.30%	199	20.00%	996
Pickens	255	29.10%	304	34.70%	316	36.10%	875
Pike	--	--	--	--	--	--	--
St. Clair	--	--	--	--	--	--	--
Shelby	429	51.30%	387	46.30%	20	2.40%	836
Tuscaloosa	441	29.20%	754	50.00%	313	20.80%	1,508
Walker	--	--	--	--	--	--	--
Washington	--	--	--	--	--	--	--
Wilcox	456	56.70%	254	31.50%	95	11.80%	805
Total	14,403	55.00%	8,137	31.10%	3,643	13.90%	26,183
