= List of people executed in Alabama (pre-1972) =

The following is a list of people executed by the U.S. state of Alabama prior to 1972, when capital punishment was briefly abolished by the Supreme Court's ruling in Furman v. Georgia. For executions after the restoration of capital punishment by the Supreme Court's ruling in Gregg v. Georgia (1976), see List of people executed in Alabama.

== Hanging ==
Slave executions

=== 1819–1829 ===
Name	Race	Age	Sex	Date of execution	County	Crime	Victim(s)	Governor
Charles Gamarra	Hispanic		M	May 19, 1820	Mobile	Accessory to murder	Diago Alvares, Hispanic (Note: de Sayas was a serial killer, confessing the murders of two men in Havana several years earlier.)	William Wyatt Bibb
Victoriano de Sayas	Hispanic		M	May 19, 1820	Mobile	Murder	Diago Alvares, Hispanic	William Wyatt Bibb
Francisco Noreago	Hispanic		M	May 30, 1822	Mobile	Murder	Juan Madina, Hispanic	Israel Pickens
Thomas Brigman	White		M	October 9, 1822	Shelby	Counterfeiting	N/A	Israel Pickens
William Nixon	White		M	October 9, 1822	Shelby	Murder	Zachariah Butler, white	Israel Pickens
Thomas Davis	White	60	M	October 11, 1822	Dallas	Counterfeiting	N/A	Israel Pickens
Horatio Wilson	White		M	November 15, 1822	Jackson	Murder	Mr. Gregg, white	Israel Pickens
Davy	Black		M	May 2, 1823	Dallas	Robbery		Israel Pickens
William Bridewell	White		M	October 24, 1823	Lawrence	Murder	Mr. Rhea, white	Israel Pickens
Edmund Lester	White		M	January 2, 1824	Madison	Murder	Female, white (wife)	Israel Pickens
Thomas Murphy	White		M	February 26, 1825	Mobile	Murder	John Kilbourn, white	Israel Pickens
Patsy	Black		F	June 10, 1825	Perry	Murder	Prior, child, black	Israel Pickens
Unknown	Black		M	1827	Washington	Murder-Rape	Winnie Caller, 15, white	John Murphy
Bob	Black		M	April 21 or 28, 1827	Tuscaloosa	Murder	Capt. Williams, white (owner)	John Murphy
John Aviles	White		M	October 5, 1827	Mobile (Federal)	Murder		John Murphy
James Hester	White		M	November 30, 1827	Tuscaloosa	Murder	Abgiail Hester, white (wife)	John Murphy
Moses	Black		M	November 30, 1827	Tuscaloosa	Rape	Female, white	John Murphy
Unknown	White		M	1828	Mobile	Murder		John Murphy

=== 1830s ===
Name	Race	Age	Sex	Date of execution	County	Crime	Victim(s)	Governor
Ben	Black		M	May 15, 1830	Pickens	Murder	Two of his children, black	Gabriel Moore
Levin	Black		M	September 1830	Dallas	Murder	John Mock, white (owner)	Gabriel Moore
Peter	Black		M	1831	Madison			? (Note: Gabriel Moore, Samuel B. Moore, or John Gayle.)
Coleman Williams	White		M	January 27, 1832	Montgomery	Murder	Silas Goree, white (constable)	John Gayle
Dick	Black		M	June 20, 1832	Fayette	Attempted rape	Female, white	John Gayle
Jack	Black		M	1833	Wilcox	Murder	Martha Hobbs, white (owner)	John Gayle
Littleton Prince	White		M	1833	Pike	Slave stealing	Two people, black	John Gayle
Unknown	Native American		M	1833	Chambers	Murder	Male, Native American	John Gayle
Horbert	Black		M	January 12, 1833	Clarke	Murder		John Gayle
Solomon	Black		M	January 12, 1833		Murder		John Gayle
Stanmore Green	White		M	May 30, 1834	Lowndes	Murder	Jack S. Green, white (uncle)	John Gayle
Jerry	Black		M	November 4, 1834	Montgomery	Rape	Margaret Gufford, white	John Gayle
Eas-Ko	Native American		M	December 12, 1834	Russell	Murder	Joe Marshall, Native American	John Gayle
Poo-Sa-La	Native American		M	December 12, 1834	Russell	Murder	Fhaslelahaku, Native American	John Gayle
Charles Boyington	White	20	M	February 20, 1835	Mobile	Murder	Nathaniel Frost, white	John Gayle
Elijah	Black		M	February 20, 1835	Franklin	Murder	Harvey L. Gholson, white	John Gayle
Charles	Black		M	February 20, 1835	Franklin	Murder	Harvey L. Gholson, white	John Gayle
Ben	Black		M	February 20, 1835	Franklin	Murder	Harvey L. Gholson, white	John Gayle
Unknown	Black		M	February 25, 1835	Fayette	Murder	Mr. Swearingen, white	John Gayle
Unknown	Black		M	February 25, 1835	Fayette	Murder	Mr. Swearingen, white	John Gayle
Unknown	Black		M	February 25, 1835	Fayette	Murder	Mr. Swearingen, white	John Gayle
Ich-Har-Se-Ne-Ha	Native American		M	August 15, 1835	Russell	Murder		John Gayle
Unknown	Black		F	January 9, 1836	Covington	Murder	Four people, white (Note: Patsy Mancill Holley, her two children, and her 12-year-old niece Ms. Jordan.)	Clement Comer Clay
Unknown	Black		F	January 9, 1836	Covington	Murder	Four people, white	Clement Comer Clay
George	Black		M	January 9, 1836	Baldwin			Clement Comer Clay
Horris	Black		M	January 9, 1836	Baldwin			Clement Comer Clay
Moses	Black		M	January 9, 1836	Dallas			Clement Comer Clay
Charles	Black		M	July 22, 1836	Madison	Murder	Willis Sanford, white	Clement Comer Clay
Dancing Rabbit	Native American		M	August 9, 1836	Madison (Federal)	Murder	Male, white	Clement Comer Clay
Chilancha	Native American		M	November 25, 1836	Russell	Murder	Male, white	Clement Comer Clay
Tus-Koo-Na Fix-A-Ko	Native American		M	November 25, 1836	Russell	Murder	A stage driver and a passenger, white	Clement Comer Clay
Unknown	Native American		M	November 25, 1836	Russell	Murder	A stage driver and a passenger, white	Clement Comer Clay
Unknown	Native American		M	November 25, 1836	Russell	Murder	A stage driver and a passenger, white	Clement Comer Clay
Unknown	Native American		M	November 25, 1836	Russell	Murder	A stage driver and a passenger, white	Clement Comer Clay
Unknown	Native American		M	November 25, 1836	Russell	Murder	A stage driver and a passenger, white	Clement Comer Clay
Unknown	Black			December 17, 1836				Clement Comer Clay
Fanny	Black		F	December 20, 1836	Perry	Attempted murder		Clement Comer Clay
Robert Norris	White		M	June 1837	Walker	Murder	Male, white (stepfather)	Clement Comer Clay
Abraham	Black		M	June 21, 1837	Tuscaloosa			Clement Comer Clay
Reuben	Black		M	June 21, 1837	Tuscaloosa			Clement Comer Clay
Jim	Black		M	June 21, 1837	Tuscaloosa	Attempted murder	Col. Dent, white	Clement Comer Clay
Clarke	Black		M	June 30, 1837	Marengo			Clement Comer Clay
Delsey	Black		F	June 30, 1837	Lauderdale			Clement Comer Clay
Ambrose	Black		M	December 23, 1837				Arthur P. Bagby
Charles	Black		M	January 5, 1839	Montgomery	Murder	Male, white (overseer)	Arthur P. Bagby
Austin	Black		M	February 2, 1839	Clarke			Arthur P. Bagby
Dick	Black		M	March 1, 1839	Dallas	Murder	John A. Russell, white (owner)	Arthur P. Bagby
John Larkin	White		M	June 21, 1839	Mobile (Federal)	Mail robbery		Arthur P. Bagby
Ransom Thornton	White		M	1839	Limestone	Murder	Mr. White, white	Arthur P. Bagby

=== 1840s ===
Name	Race	Age	Sex	Date of execution	County	Crime	Victim(s)	Governor
Dave	Black		M	July 4, 1840	Autauga	Murder	Martin H. Lary, white	Arthur P. Bagby
Jim	Black		M	July 4, 1840	Autauga	Murder	Martin H. Lary, white	Arthur P. Bagby
Lewis	Black		M	July 4, 1840	Autauga	Murder	Martin H. Lary, white	Arthur P. Bagby
Alfred	Black		M	January 27, 1840	Washington	Murder	Flavel Vivion, white (owner)	Arthur P. Bagby
Austin	Black		M	January 27, 1840	Washington	Murder	Flavel Vivion, white (owner)	Arthur P. Bagby
Charles	Black		M	January 31, 1840				Arthur P. Bagby
Anthony	Black		M	February 3, 1840				Arthur P. Bagby
Daniel	Black		M	February 5, 1840	Macon	Arson		Arthur P. Bagby
George	Black		M	February 5, 1840	Marengo	Murder	Luke M. Grigsby, white (owner)	Arthur P. Bagby
Unknown	Black		F	February 5, 1840				Arthur P. Bagby
Harry	Black		M	September 1840	Perry	Attempted rape	Rebecca Harris, white	Arthur P. Bagby
Mark Thornton	White		M	December 11, 1840	Madison (Note: Crime committed in Limestone County (see Ransom Thornton).)	Murder-Robbery	Mr. White, white	Arthur P. Bagby
Dave	Black		M	December 15, 1840	Monroe			Arthur P. Bagby
Morris	Black		M	December 15, 1840	Monroe			Arthur P. Bagby
Unknown	Black			December 15, 1840				Arthur P. Bagby
James Grimes	White		M	1841	Russell	Murder	Bush Crowder, white	Arthur P. Bagby
Unknown	Black			January 7, 1841	Montgomery			Arthur P. Bagby
Unknown	Black			January 7, 1841				Arthur P. Bagby
Unknown	Black			January 8, 1841	Tallapoosa			Arthur P. Bagby
Jesse	Black		M	January 9, 1841	Coosa			Arthur P. Bagby
Jacob	Black		M	March 1841	Tuscaloosa			Arthur P. Bagby
Dick	Black		M	April 2, 1841	Greene			Arthur P. Bagby
Sam	Black		M	April 10, 1841	Autauga			Arthur P. Bagby
Isaac Davis	White		M	November 26, 1841	Lowndes	Murder	Samuel Frost, white (girlfriend's husband)	Benjamin Fitzpatrick
James Harkins	White		M	January 3, 1842	Montgomery	Murder	Eugene Bougely, white	Benjamin Fitzpatrick
Unknown	Black		M	January 12, 1842	Mobile	Murder	Unknown, black	Benjamin Fitzpatrick
Chesley	White		M	February 1, 1842	Montgomery	Murder	Mr. Newell, white	Benjamin Fitzpatrick
Jack	Black		M	October 21, 1842	Tuscaloosa	Attempted murder	Male, white	Benjamin Fitzpatrick
Jack	Black		M	December 22, 1842	Perry	Murder		Benjamin Fitzpatrick
Nelson	Black		M	December 26, 1842	Mobile			Benjamin Fitzpatrick
Bill	Black		M	January 12, 1843	Greene			Benjamin Fitzpatrick
Emry	Black		M	January 12, 1843	Greene			Benjamin Fitzpatrick
Sam	Black		M	February 2, 1843	Marengo			Benjamin Fitzpatrick
Abel	Black		M	February 2, 1843	Perry			Benjamin Fitzpatrick
Martin	Black		M	February 2, 1843	Perry			Benjamin Fitzpatrick
Abram	Black		M	February 8, 1843				Benjamin Fitzpatrick
Biddy	Black			February 8, 1843				Benjamin Fitzpatrick
Bob	Black		M	February 8, 1843				Benjamin Fitzpatrick
Charles	Black		M	February 8, 1843				Benjamin Fitzpatrick
George	Black		M	February 8, 1843				Benjamin Fitzpatrick
Isaac	Black		M	February 8, 1843				Benjamin Fitzpatrick
Henry Eaton	White	50	M	February 11, 1843	Clarke	Rape	Female, white (daughter)	Benjamin Fitzpatrick
Andy	Black		M	February 11, 1843				Benjamin Fitzpatrick
Mary	Black		F	February 11, 1843				Benjamin Fitzpatrick
Unknown	White		M	February 11, 1843	Macon			Benjamin Fitzpatrick
Unknown	Black		M	January 15, 1844	Jefferson			Benjamin Fitzpatrick
Nancy	Black		F	March 1844	Montgomery	Attempted murder	Mary Beasley, white	Benjamin Fitzpatrick
Reuben	Black		M	September 27, 1844	Limestone	Murder		Benjamin Fitzpatrick
Simon	Black		M	September 27, 1844	Limestone	Murder		Benjamin Fitzpatrick
Free Henry	Black		M	October 1845	Conecuh	Murder	James Hawthorne, white	Benjamin Fitzpatrick
Joseph Boggs	White		M	December 5, 1845	Chambers	Murder	Female, white (daughter)	Benjamin Fitzpatrick
Martin	Black		M	April 1846	Madison	Murder		Joshua L. Martin
Charles	Black		M	December 23, 1847				Reuben Chapman
Unknown	Black			January 31, 1848				Reuben Chapman
Ben	Black		M	March 6, 1848	Madison			Reuben Chapman
Unknown	Black			May 1, 1848				Reuben Chapman
Unknown	Black			May 15, 1848				Reuben Chapman
Balaam	Black	25	M	January 1849	Dallas	Murder		Reuben Chapman
Unknown	Black			February 23, 1849	Macon			Reuben Chapman
Ben	Black	25	M	August 12, 1849	Mobile	Attempted rape	Female, white	Reuben Chapman
Anthony	Black		M	October 5, 1849	Chambers	Attempted rape	Female, white	Reuben Chapman
Stephen	Black		M	November 23, 1849	Sumter			Reuben Chapman
Pherebe	Black	25	F	December 11, 1849	Fayette	Murder	Elizabeth Yerby Shepherd, elderly, white (owner)	Reuben Chapman

=== 1850s ===
Name	Race	Age	Sex	Date of execution	County	Crime	Victim(s)	Governor
Stewart	Black		M	January 15, 1850	Marshall			Henry W. Collier
Jim	Black		M	February 6, 1850	Jackson	Attempted rape	Nancy G. Cloud, white	Henry W. Collier
Unknown	Black			February 8, 1850	Choctaw	Murder		Henry W. Collier
Unknown	Black		M	May 11, 1850	Chambers	Murder	Dr. McCantz, white (owner)	Henry W. Collier
Unknown	Black			June 1850	Butler	Murder	B. B. Boykin, white (owner)	Henry W. Collier
Newton	Black		M	October 25, 1850	Lauderdale	Murder	William Oliver, white (owner)	Henry W. Collier
Big Joe	Black		M	November 1, 1850	Greene	Murder	Capt. Peter Hamilton, white (owner)	Henry W. Collier
Little Joe	Black		M	November 1, 1850	Greene	Murder	Capt. Peter Hamilton, white (owner)	Henry W. Collier
Bill	Black		M	November 1, 1850	Greene	Murder	Capt. Peter Hamilton, white (owner)	Henry W. Collier
Unknown	Black			December 20, 1850	Marengo	Murder	Male, 35, black	Henry W. Collier
Unknown	Black			December 26, 1850	Shelby			Henry W. Collier
Unknown	Black			January 27, 1851	Pickens			Henry W. Collier
Jack	Black		M	April 26, 1851	Greene			Henry W. Collier
Dick	Black		M	May 10, 1851	Russell	Murder	Absalom Yancey, white (owner)	Henry W. Collier
Sam	Black		M	May 2, 1851	Henry	Murder		Henry W. Collier
Wade	Black		M	May 3, 1851	Wilcox	Arson		Henry W. Collier
Dave	Black		M	May 3, 1851	Wilcox	Attempted murder	Male, white (owner)	Henry W. Collier
Lewis Roberts	Black		M	May 7, 1851	Lauderdale	Murder		Henry W. Collier
Henry	Black		M	May 23, 1851	Morgan	Murder	Male, black	Henry W. Collier
George	Black		M	October 17, 1851	Butler	Attempted murder	Mrs. Glanton, white	Henry W. Collier
George	Black		M	October 24, 1851	Tuscaloosa	Attempted rape	Female, white	Henry W. Collier
Young	Black		M	October 31, 1851	Coosa	Attempted murder		Henry W. Collier
Unknown	Black			December 10, 1851	Pickens			Henry W. Collier
Unknown	Black			January 8, 1852	Greene			Henry W. Collier
Jim	Black		M	January 17, 1852	Jackson			Henry W. Collier
Newton	Black		M	February 6, 1852	Lauderdale			Henry W. Collier
Five unknowns	Black			February 10, 1852	Greene			Henry W. Collier
Jim	Black		M	April 2, 1852	Macon	Murder		Henry W. Collier
Seaborn	Black		M	April 2, 1852	Macon	Murder		Henry W. Collier
Lewis	Black		M	April 9, 1852	Lawrence	Murder	William Mullins, white (owner)	Henry W. Collier
Handy	Black		M	April 19, 1852	Jefferson			Henry W. Collier
Unknown	Black			April 26, 1852	Conecuh			Henry W. Collier
Peter	Black		M	May 18, 1852	Russell			Henry W. Collier
Tom	Black		M	May 25, 1852	Lowndes			Henry W. Collier
Nathan Crist	White		M	September 3, 1852	Mobile	Murder	Theodore Nye, white	Henry W. Collier
Lewis	Black		M	October 4, 1852	Lawrence			Henry W. Collier
Unknown	Black			November 9, 1852	Coosa			Henry W. Collier
Unknown	Black			July 25, 1853	Blount			Henry W. Collier
John Wallace	Black		M	June 17, 1853	Perry	Murder	John Rickard, elderly, white (Wallace's owner)	Henry W. Collier
George	Black		M	June 17, 1853	Perry	Murder	John Rickard, elderly, white (Wallace's owner)	Henry W. Collier
Wash	Black		M	June 17, 1853	Perry	Murder	John Rickard, elderly, white (Wallace's owner)	Henry W. Collier
Ben	Black		M	December 3, 1853	Pickens			Henry W. Collier
Dave	Black		M	January 23, 1854	Perry	Attempted murder	Mr. Cunningham, white (rental owner) (Note: Rented to Cunningham by Sarah Underwood.)	John A. Winston
Jesse	Black		M	January 25, 1854	Dale			John A. Winston
Adam	Black		M	July 7, 1854	Montgomery	Attempted murder		John A. Winston
Unknown	Black		M	October 1854	Chambers			John A. Winston
Phil	Black		M	October 1854	Butler	Attempted murder	Male, white (overseer)	John A. Winston
Joe	Black		M	November 25, 1854	Mobile	Attempted murder	E. O. Johnson, white (owner)	John A. Winston
Unknown	Black		M	January 1855	Montgomery	Murder	Male, white (owner)	John A. Winston
Unknown	Black		M	January 1855	Montgomery	Murder	Female, black (wife)	John A. Winston
Tom	Black		M	January 18, 1855	Mobile	Attempted murder		John A. Winston
Martha	Black		F	March 1855	Dallas	Arson	James E. Todd and Allen W. Coleman, white	John A. Winston
Jacob	Black		M	March 31, 1855	Madison	Murder	Mrs. Routt, white (owner)	John A. Winston
Jorge Romero	White		M	May 1, 1855	Mobile	Murder	Mr. Clark, white	John A. Winston
Unknown	Black			April 20, 1855	Dallas			John A. Winston
Unknown	Black			August 21, 1855	Montgomery			John A. Winston
Jefferson	Black		M	November 17, 1855	Mobile	Murder		John A. Winston
Jake	Black		M	December 3, 1855	Butler	Theft-Stealing	Addison Scarborough, white (owner) (Note: Stole a 25-cent piece of tobacco.)	John A. Winston
Jeff	Black		M	December 13, 1855	Dallas			John A. Winston
Unknown	Black		M	January 9, 1856				John A. Winston
John Beasley	White		M	February 1, 1856	Mobile	Murder	Willis Barbour, white	John A. Winston
Lancelot Franklin	White		M	March 21, 1856	Walker	Murder	Absalom Boone, white	John A. Winston
Nat	Black		M	March 27, 1856				John A. Winston
Unknown	Black			September 22, 1856				John A. Winston
Unknown	Black			September 26, 1856				John A. Winston
Bill	Black		M	August 12, 1856	Coffee	Murder	Benjamin Adams, white	John A. Winston
Unknown	Black			February 20, 1857	Greene			John A. Winston
Unknown	Black			March 24, 1857	Tallapoosa			John A. Winston
Unknown	Black			May 9, 1857	Dallas			John A. Winston
Unknown	Black			May 20, 1857	Chambers			John A. Winston
Unknown	Black			July 20, 1857				John A. Winston
Nat	Black		M	September or October 1857	Madison	Murder	Female, black (wife)	John A. Winston
Joe Pigeon	Mixed (Note: "Indian half-breed".)		M	November 13, 1857	Mobile	Murder	Lewis Williams, white	John A. Winston
Unknown	Black			November 24, 1857				John A. Winston
Five unknowns	Black			December 19, 1857	Sumter	Murder	R. E. Stewart, white (owner)	Andrew B. Moore
Manuel	Black		M	December 23, 1857	Montgomery	Murder	Unknown, black (child)	Andrew B. Moore
Larkin Bramlett	White		M	March 5, 1858	Calhoun (Note: Tried in Benton, then part of Cherokee County.)	Murder	Benjamin F. O'Bannon, white	Andrew B. Moore
Unknown	Black			April 27, 1858				Andrew B. Moore
Godfrey	Black	12	M	July 16, 1858	Mobile	Murder	Lawrence Gomez, 4, white	Andrew B. Moore
Unknown	Black			August 20, 1858				Andrew B. Moore
Unknown	Black			September 6, 1858				Andrew B. Moore
Ralph	Black		M	September 17, 1858	Madison	Murder	William H. Spence, white (owner)	Andrew B. Moore
Larkin	Black	18	M	September 27, 1858	Limestone	Murder	Thomas Bibb, white	Andrew B. Moore
Braddock	Black		M	November 12, 1858	Choctaw			Andrew B. Moore
Bob	Black		M	1859	Choctaw			Andrew B. Moore
Dabney	Black		M	May 27, 1859	Barbour	Attempted murder	Mr. Garland, white (owner)	Andrew B. Moore
Matt	Black		M	May 27, 1859	Barbour	Murder	Mr. Garland, white (owner)	Andrew B. Moore
Sandy	Black		M	1859 (Note: After May.)	Choctaw	Murder	Burell B. Boykin, 80, white (owner)	Andrew B. Moore
Unknown	Black			June 23, 1859				Andrew B. Moore
Unknown	Black			July 11, 1859				Andrew B. Moore
Two unknowns	Black			July 12, 1859				Andrew B. Moore
George W. Jordan	White	40	M	August 19, 1859	Mobile	Murder	Male, white	Andrew B. Moore
Unknown	Black			October 22, 1859	Barbour			Andrew B. Moore
Nancy	Black		F	November 25, 1859	Pike	Murder	Four people, white (Note: Her owner Thomas Frazell, Frazell's overseer's wife, her child, and Frazell's granddaughter.)	Andrew B. Moore
Antony	Black	45	M	December 8, 1859	Mobile	Murder	Primus, black	Andrew B. Moore

=== 1860s ===
Name	Race	Age	Sex	Date of execution	County	Crime	Victim(s)	Governor
Unknown	Black		F	1860-1865	Tallapoosa	Murder	Mrs. Jess Farmer, white	?
James Aiken	White		M	March 7, 1860	Autauga	Murder-Robbery	Mike Tibbetts, white	Andrew B. Moore
Butler	Black		M	May 11, 1860	Henry			Andrew B. Moore
William Kirby	White	31	M	June 15, 1860	Fayette	Murder	Archibald and Wade Kirby, 62 and 30, white (father and brother)	Andrew B. Moore
Adam	Black		M	July 13, 1860	Montgomery	Murder-Robbery	Alfred Jones, white (owner)	Andrew B. Moore
June	Black		F	July 13, 1860	Montgomery	Murder-Robbery	Alfred Jones, white (owner)	Andrew B. Moore
Abner Paris	White		M	August 10, 1860	Marshall	Murder	James Rose, white	Andrew B. Moore
Unknown	Black		M	October 15, 1860	Russell			Andrew B. Moore
Caesar	Black		M	October 19, 1860	Talladega	Slave revolt		Andrew B. Moore
Sam	Black		M	October 19, 1860	Talladega	Slave revolt		Andrew B. Moore
Sanford	Black		M	October 19, 1860	Talladega	Slave revolt		Andrew B. Moore
Unknown			M	1860	Monroe	Murder	Male, elderly, white (Note: Executed a month apart between January and April ("just before the civil war").)	Andrew B. Moore
Unknown			F	1860	Monroe	Murder	Male, elderly, white	Andrew B. Moore
Moses	Black		M	January 29, 1861	Perry	Murder	Mr. Oakes, white (overseer)	Andrew B. Moore
Jack	Black		M	February 25, 1861	Morgan	Murder		Andrew B. Moore
Henry	Black		M	February 28, 1861	Dallas			Andrew B. Moore
Charles	Black		M	April 29, 1861	Macon	Murder		Andrew B. Moore
Lizzie	Black		F	June 18, 1861	Montgomery			Andrew B. Moore
Scott	Black		M	June 26, 1861	Dallas (Note: Change of venue from Wilcox County.)			Andrew B. Moore
Jerry	Black		M	October 22, 1861	Jefferson			Andrew B. Moore
Gabriel	Black		M	October 23, 1861	Tuscaloosa	Attempted murder (Note: The victim apparently died shortly afterwards, but the exact cause is unclear.)	Robert Morgan, white (owner)	Andrew B. Moore
Mack	Black		M	March 26, 1862	Coosa	Rape	Mrs. Barnes, white	John Gill Shorter
Manuel	Black		M	June 30, 1862	Montgomery			John Gill Shorter
Isham	Black		M	September 11, 1862	Jefferson			John Gill Shorter
Jesse	Black		M	September 11, 1862	Calhoun			John Gill Shorter
Herman Karminsky	White		M	October 17, 1862	Coosa	Murder	Dr. Ambrose Burrows, white (penitentiary warden) (Note: Serving a life term for his involvement in the fatal poisoning of his girlfriend Nancy's owner, Thomas Frazell, along with Frazell's overseer's wife, her child, and Frazell's granddaughter. Nancy (see above) was executed for her role in the crime in 1859.)	John Gill Shorter
Daniel	Black		M	December 31, 1862	Mobile			John Gill Shorter
Henry	Black		M	February 3, 1863	Mobile			John Gill Shorter
Oliver	Black		M	February 3, 1863	Perry			John Gill Shorter
Crockett	Black		M	March 24, 1863	Pike	Murder		John Gill Shorter
Claiborne	Black		M	April 21, 1863	Wilcox			John Gill Shorter
Wilson	Black		M	November 21, 1863	Dallas			John Gill Shorter
John	Black		M	December 14, 1863				Thomas H. Watts
Ben	Black		M	February 9, 1864	Baldwin			Thomas H. Watts
Eliza	Black		F	February 17, 1864	Marengo			Thomas H. Watts
Alexander Pharris	White		M	March 1864	Mobile (Military)	Desertion	N/A	Thomas H. Watts
David McGibbon	White		M	March 11, 1864	Marengo (Military)	Espionage	N/A	Thomas H. Watts
Anthony	Black		M	May 5, 1864	Autauga			Thomas H. Watts
Cyrus	Black		M	July 12, 1864	Sumter			Thomas H. Watts
Bill	Black		M	August 8, 1864	Coffee			Thomas H. Watts
Elleck	Black		M	August 9, 1864	Monroe			Thomas H. Watts
Sam	Black		M	August 12, 1864	Wilcox			Thomas H. Watts
Jack	Black		M	September 29, 1864	Choctaw			Thomas H. Watts
John Brown	Black		M	October 7, 1864	Shelby			Thomas H. Watts
Unknown	Black			October 14, 1864	Mobile			Thomas H. Watts
John Carroll	White	34	M	November 11, 1864	Mobile (Military)	Rape		Thomas H. Watts
Lawson	Black		M	November 12, 1864				Thomas H. Watts
March	Black		M	January 6, 1865	Mobile			Thomas H. Watts
Unknown	Black			January 18, 1865				Thomas H. Watts
Henry	Black	15	M	April 20, 1866	Mobile	Murder	Mr. Mulvey, 13, white	Robert M. Patton
Abe Jacobs	Black		M	June 1, 1866	Jackson	Murder-Rape	Ms. Stone, child, white	Robert M. Patton
Isham Young	Black		M	December 1866	Wilcox	Murder	Sandy Bell, black	Robert M. Patton
Paul Taylor	Black		M	August 23, 1867	Montgomery	Murder	Male, white	Robert M. Patton
Charles Robinson	Black		M	September 27, 1867	Mobile			Robert M. Patton
Jim Richardson	Black		M	September 27, 1867	Mobile			Robert M. Patton
Grant	Black		M	September 27, 1867	Mobile			Robert M. Patton
Jacob Keener	White		M	November 1, 1867	Marshall	Murder	John White, white	Robert M. Patton
Aaron Rich	Black		M	1869	Cherokee	Murder-Robbery	Williams family, white (Note: Arthur Williams, his wife, and their two children.)	William Hugh Smith
Isaac Johnson	Mixed (Note: Mulatto.)	18	M	March 12, 1869	Mobile	Murder-Robbery	Archie McLaughlin, white (Note: Also took part in the gang rape of an elderly white woman the night before.)	William Hugh Smith
Lewis Tomlin	Black	21	M	March 12, 1869	Mobile	Murder-Robbery	Archie McLaughlin, white	William Hugh Smith

=== 1870s ===
Name	Race	Age	Sex	Date of execution	County	Crime	Victim(s)	Governor
Joe Lock	White		M	March 21, 1873	Marengo	Murder	Male, white	David P. Lewis
Jack Hartman	Black		M	January 15, 1874	Barbour	Murder		David P. Lewis
Wesley McLean	Black		M	January 15, 1874	Barbour	Murder		David P. Lewis
Unknown	Black		M	1874	Tuscaloosa			Lewis or Houston
Eugene Kelly	Black		M	August 6, 1875	Dallas	Murder-Robbery	Andrew Cunningham, black	George S. Houston
James Williams			M	November 5, 1875	Escambia	Murder		George S. Houston
James Boddie	Black		M	April 28, 1876	Colbert (Note: Change of venue from Lauderdale County.)	Rape	Artitia Little, white	George S. Houston
Nelson Walker	Black		M	July 28, 1876	Clarke	Murder	John A. Bondurant, white	George S. Houston
Henry Ezell	Black		M	July 28, 1876	Clarke	Murder	John A. Bondurant, white	George S. Houston
Unknown			M	1878	St. Clair			George S. Houston
Robert Jones	Black		M	March 10, 1878	Perry	Murder	Isaac D. Moore, white	George S. Houston
Lucius Porter	Black		M	March 10, 1878	Perry	Murder	Isaac D. Moore, white	George S. Houston
Silas Wright	Black		M	March 10, 1878	Perry	Murder	Isaac D. Moore, white	George S. Houston
Albert Young	Black		M	March 10, 1878	Perry	Murder	Isaac D. Moore, white	George S. Houston
Jerry Childs	Black		M	March 22, 1878	Henry (Note: Change of venue from Dale County.)	Murder	Rosannah Yon, white	George S. Houston
Isaac Childs	Black		M	March 22, 1878	Henry	Murder	Rosannah Yon, white	George S. Houston
Jacob Childs	Black		M	March 22, 1878	Henry	Murder	Rosannah Yon, white	George S. Houston
Glasgow Bell	Black	24	M	July 26, 1878	Butler	Murder	Sam Blair, black	George S. Houston
Robert Mitchell	Black		M	August 23, 1878	Bullock	Murder	Isabelle Hooks, black (grandmother)	George S. Houston
Henry Golden	Black		M	November 1, 1878	Escambia	Rape	Female, 18, white	George S. Houston
Sam Cooke	Black		M	January 17, 1879	Butler	Murder	Primus Caldwell, black (girlfriend's husband)	Rufus W. Cobb
Charles Rash	Black		M	April 25, 1879	Colbert	Murder	Female, black (wife)	Rufus W. Cobb

=== 1880s ===
Name	Race	Age	Sex	Date of execution	County	Crime	Victim(s)	Governor
Jim DuBose	Black		M	1880	Wilcox	Murder	C. C. Capell, white	Rufus W. Cobb
Bill Kelly	Black		M	1880	Wilcox	Murder	Male, black	Rufus W. Cobb
Robert Wells	Black		M	January 16, 1880	Marengo	Murder-Robbery	J. M. Martin, white	Rufus W. Cobb
John Mayfield	Black		M	March 12, 1880	Lauderdale	Murder	Toby Irving, black	Rufus W. Cobb
Will Reynolds	Black		M	December 9, 1880	Pike	Rape	Female, child, white	Rufus W. Cobb
Albert Williams	Black		M	June 3, 1881	Sumter	Murder	Major Hutchings, white	Rufus W. Cobb
George Griffin	Black		M	August 12, 1881	Jefferson	Rape	Emily Segars, white	Rufus W. Cobb
Ben Perkins	Black		M	August 26, 1881	Sumter	Murder	Gilbert Roberts, black	Rufus W. Cobb
Al Weisinger	Black		M	March 31, 1882	Dallas	Murder-Robbery	Jesse B. Weisinger, elderly, white	Rufus W. Cobb
Bill Ledlow	Black		M	March 31, 1882	Dallas	Murder-Robbery	Jesse B. Weisinger, elderly, white	Rufus W. Cobb
John Redd	Black	27	M	December 15, 1882	Russell	Murder	Lucy Lee, black (girlfriend)	Edward A. O'Neal
Bob Cochran	Black		M	March 9, 1883	Barbour	Murder-Robbery	M. L. Drew, white	Edward A. O'Neal
Taylor Banks	Mixed (Note: Mulatto.)	33	M	August 18, 1883	Jackson	Murder	Turner Woods, white	Edward A. O'Neal
Frank Shelton	Black		M	September 7, 1883	Hale	Murder	Lucy Shelton, black (wife)	Edward A. O'Neal
Lewellen Roberson	Black		M	June 13, 1884	Russell	Murder	Troy Allen, black	Edward A. O'Neal
Phillip Henderson	Black		M	July 18, 1884	Wilcox	Murder	Col. Robert D. Boykin, white	Edward A. O'Neal
Asbury Hughes	White	22	M	August 1, 1884	Jackson	Arson	Porter family, white (Note: 80+-year-old Mr. Porter and his 70+-year-old wife along with Ms. Standish, Mrs. Chubbuck, "orphan girl" Nannie Ramsey, and 13-year-old Hattie Large.)	Edward A. O'Neal
George Hughes	White	21	M	August 1, 1884	Jackson	Arson	Porter family, white	Edward A. O'Neal
George Smith	White	30	M	August 1, 1884	Jackson	Arson	Porter family, white	Edward A. O'Neal
John Kelley	Black		M	August 29, 1884	Wilcox	Rape	Female, 6, white	Edward A. O'Neal
Scip Holley	Black		M	August 29, 1884	Tuscaloosa	Murder	Luther Sealy, white	Edward A. O'Neal
Jim McElroy	Black		M	August 29, 1884	Dallas	Murder	Mary McElroy, black (wife)	Edward A. O'Neal
Sanford Jackson	Black		M	February 13, 1885	Dallas	Murder	Rufus Gill, black	Edward A. O'Neal
John West	Black		M	March 13, 1885	Montgomery	Murder	Claiborne Wilson, black	Edward A. O'Neal
Charley Townsend	Black		M	August 28, 1885	Madison	Murder-Robbery	Nathan M. Freeman, elderly, white	Edward A. O'Neal
Shelley Montgomery	Black		M	August 28, 1885	Talladega	Murder-Robbery	Johnson Groce, minor, black	Edward A. O'Neal
William Ward	White	51	M	March 19, 1886	Dale	Murder	Jacob Palmer, white	Edward A. O'Neal
George Davis	White		M	June 26, 1886	Russell	Murder	Archibald Reems, white (girlfriend's brother)	Edward A. O'Neal
Nathan Moseley	Black	17	M	October 8, 1886	Bullock	Rape	Mrs. Christian Gayle, 75, white	Edward A. O'Neal
Jim Miller	Black		M	January 14, 1887	Butler	Murder	Female, black (wife)	Thomas Seay
Shade Scarborough	Black		M	April 8, 1887	Barbour	Murder	Madison Caesar, elderly, black	Thomas Seay
Walter Jackson	Black		M	April 15, 1887	Walker	Murder-Robbery	Henry Pope Wooten, white (Note: Previously accused of murdering a man in Kentucky.)	Thomas Seay
Henry Robinson	Black	47	M	November 4, 1887	Bullock	Murder	Adam Owen, 80, black (girlfriend's husband)	Thomas Seay
Gus Edmundson	White		M	December 30, 1887	Morgan	Murder	Female, white (wife)	Thomas Seay
Simon Pitts	Black		M	July 20, 1888	Barbour	Murder	London Walker, 108, black	Thomas Seay
Pauline McCoy	Black	22	F	October 12, 1888	Bullock	Murder	Annie Jordan, 16, white	Thomas Seay
Levi Bruner	Black		M	November 4, 1888	Henry	Murder	Raiford Washington, black	Thomas Seay
John Holiness	Black	23	M	November 23, 1888	Perry	Murder	Celia Johnson, 15, black (girlfriend)	Thomas Seay
Jim Seams	Black		M	January 25, 1889	Greene (Note: Change of venue from Tuscaloosa County.)	Murder	James Autry, white (deputy sheriff)	Thomas Seay
Wesley Crisholm	White		M	July 1, 1889	Chambers	Murder		Thomas Seay
Charlie Johnson	Black	25	M	December 6, 1889	Etowah	Murder	D. J. Kinney, white (police officer) (Note: Serial killer. (No information on previous murders given.))	Thomas Seay

=== 1890s ===
Name	Race	Age	Sex	Date of execution	County	Crime	Victim(s)	Governor
Fred Kidd	Black		M	January 3, 1890	Clarke	Murder	Sam Walker, black	Thomas Seay
Green Braxton	Black		M	January 24, 1890	Montgomery	Murder-Burglary	Louis Pugh, 72, white	Thomas Seay
Sam Dill	Black		M	February 7, 1890	Calhoun	Murder	Joe Smith, black	Thomas Seay
Gilbert Lowe	Black	21	M	February 21, 1890	Jefferson	Murder-Robbery	J. W. Meadows, white	Thomas Seay
Henry Duncan	White		M	February 21, 1890	Dale	Murder	Dolly Duncan, white (wife)	Thomas Seay
Richard Hawes	White	33	M	February 28, 1890	Jefferson	Murder	Three people, white (Note: His wife and their two daughters, 12-year-old May and 9-year-old Irene.)	Thomas Seay
Robert Rains	White		M	March 14, 1890	Morgan	Murder	Rev. "Bones" Rains, white (brother)	Thomas Seay
Ben Elzey	Black	23	M	April 18, 1890	Jefferson	Murder-Robbery	J. W. Meadows, white (Note: Serial killer, committed more than 21 murders dating back to age 14 across Georgia, Alabama, Louisiana, and Tennessee, including that of his 70-year-old grandmother in Georgia.)	Thomas Seay
Sandy Jones	Black	22	M	May 9, 1890	Jefferson	Murder	John Manning, white (police officer)	Thomas Seay
Alfred Cooper	Black	25	M	July 11, 1890	Jefferson	Murder	Jeff Cooper, black (Note: Also suspected of another murder in Pensacola, Florida.)	Thomas Seay
Stepney Ford	Black		M	December 19, 1890	Russell	Murder	Columbus Patterson, black	Thomas G. Jones
John Johnson	Black	15	M	January 16, 1891	Lee	Murder	P. Jenkins Moore, white (justice of the peace)	Thomas G. Jones
Monk Flournoy	Black		M	May 8, 1891	Geneva	Rape	Female, white	Thomas G. Jones
Jim Davidson	Black		M	June 26, 1891	Lowndes	Murder	Mr. Shanks, white (overseer)	Thomas G. Jones
Robert Carter	Black		M	January 22, 1892	Wilcox	Murder	Julia Carter, black (wife)	Thomas G. Jones
Bob McCord	Black		M	March 19, 1892	Jackson	Murder	Nancy Ruckles McCord, black (wife)	Thomas G. Jones
Sam Maull	Black	17	M	July 8, 1892	Lowndes	Murder	Edward T. Maull, white	Thomas G. Jones
Peter Edwards	Black	19	M	July 24, 1892	Wilcox	Murder-Robbery	Conrad G. Knight, white	Thomas G. Jones
William Scroggins	White	20	M	January 27, 1893	Jefferson	Murder-Robbery	S. Shustig, white	Thomas G. Jones
Sam Smith	Black	19	M	February 2, 1893	Jefferson	Murder-Robbery	Isaac Berger, white	Thomas G. Jones
Bob Sims	Black	20	M	March 3, 1893	Jefferson	Murder	Ebur Jordan, 40, black	Thomas G. Jones
Sherman Arp	Black		M	March 10, 1893	Cherokee	Murder	George Pogue, elderly, white	Thomas G. Jones
Jim Rencher	Black		M	May 12, 1893	Greene	Murder-Robbery	R. P. Hairston, white	Thomas G. Jones
Robert Alexander	Black	18	M	May 26, 1893	Macon	Rape-Burglary	Mrs. Jesse Cox, white	Thomas G. Jones
Howard Pugh	Black	17	M	May 26, 1893	Macon	Rape-Burglary	Mrs. Jesse Cox, white	Thomas G. Jones
Louis Pugh	Black	18	M	May 26, 1893	Macon	Rape-Burglary	Mrs. Jesse Cox, white	Thomas G. Jones
Amos Hodge	Black		M	July 7, 1893	Escambia	Murder	Rose Stainback, black	Thomas G. Jones
Steptoe Green	Black	33	M	September 15, 1893	Sumter	Murder	Harriet Marr, black (mother-in-law)	Thomas G. Jones
Will Lacy	Black	21	M	October 9, 1893	Walker	Rape	Female, 60, white	Thomas G. Jones
Mitchell Wooten	Black		M	November 21, 1893	Dale	Murder-Burglary	Mr. and Mrs. Angus McSween, 67 (Mr. McSween), white	Thomas G. Jones
Will Farmer	Black	24	M	January 5, 1894	Tuscaloosa	Murder	Female, black (wife)	Thomas G. Jones
Israel Johnson	Black		M	March 30, 1894	Bullock	Murder	Wash Roberts, black	Thomas G. Jones
Jesse Jackson	Black	22	M	April 20, 1894	Covington	Murder	Green Phillips, elderly, black	Thomas G. Jones
William McNeil	Black		M	May 18, 1894	Mobile	Murder	Catherine McNeil, black (wife)	Thomas G. Jones
Armistead Rice	Black		M	May 18, 1894	Greene	Murder	Burrell Kimbro, black (Note: Serial killer, previously murdered a black woman for refusing to marry him and confessed to two other murders in Birmingham and Mississippi.)	Thomas G. Jones
Jim Calloway	Black		M	July 13, 1894	Montgomery	Murder	Ed Grant, 45, white	Thomas G. Jones
Joe Woodley	Black		M	July 13, 1894	Montgomery	Murder	Ed Grant, 45, white	Thomas G. Jones
Porter Davis	Black	23	M	July 20, 1894	Montgomery	Murder	Goodwin Jones, black (girlfriend's husband)	Thomas G. Jones
Charles Ezell	Black	30	M	July 20, 1894	Montgomery	Murder	Hester Ezell, black (wife)	Thomas G. Jones
Dan Washington	Black	27	M	July 20, 1894	Montgomery	Murder-Robbery	John D. Perkins, white	Thomas G. Jones
Wilson Woodley	Black		M	September 20, 1894	Montgomery	Murder	Ed Grant, 45, white	Thomas G. Jones
Jackson Hicks	Black		M	October 11, 1894	Bullock	Murder	Mr. Carey, white	Thomas G. Jones
Amos Tyson	Black		M	October 11, 1894	Bullock	Murder	Mr. Carey, white	Thomas G. Jones
Jim Summers	Black		M	November 16, 1894	Dale	Murder-Burglary	Mr. and Mrs. Angus McSween, 67 (Mr. McSween), white	Thomas G. Jones
Eugene Byars	White	33	M	February 8, 1895	Jefferson	Murder-Robbery	Eugene Walker, white (cousin) (Note: Serial killer, committed two previous murders but was acquitted of both.)	Joseph F. Johnston
Lee Harris	Black	23	M	June 7, 1895	Jefferson	Murder-Robbery	Pleas Meriwether, elderly, black (Note: Also previously murdered white grocer James F. Thornton.)	Joseph F. Johnston
Abe Mitchell	Black	22	M	June 7, 1895	Jefferson	Murder-Robbery	Pleas Meriwether, elderly, black	Joseph F. Johnston
Phillip Goodwin	Black		M	June 14, 1895	Mobile	Murder	John Poole, white	Joseph F. Johnston
Thomas Norville	Black		M	July 5, 1895	Mobile	Murder	Louis Coleman, black	Joseph F. Johnston
Phillip Roundtree	Black		M	August 2, 1895	Lowndes	Murder	Lou Roundtree, black (wife)	Joseph F. Johnston
Freeman Collins	Black		M	January 10, 1896	Macon	Murder	Della Collins, black (wife)	Joseph F. Johnston
Joseph Brown	Black		M	April 4, 1896	Bullock	Murder	Johnston Dalton, white	Joseph F. Johnston
Charles Burton	Black		M	April 4, 1896	Bullock	Murder	Johnston Dalton, white	Joseph F. Johnston
John Walton	Black		M	May 8, 1896	Jefferson	Murder	Jasper Thornton, white (inmate)	Joseph F. Johnston
Mike McCrea	Black		M	May 9, 1896	Dale	Murder-Burglary	Mr. and Mrs. Angus McSween, 67 (Mr. McSween), white	Joseph F. Johnston
William H. M. Gray	Black		M	August 21, 1896	Mobile	Murder-Robbery	John Lyndburgh, elderly, white	Joseph F. Johnston
Henry Dawson	Black	30	M	November 13, 1896	Macon	Murder	Female, black (wife)	Joseph F. Johnston
Jackson Young	Black		M	November 28, 1896	Russell	Murder-Rape	Female, 16, black (sister)	Joseph F. Johnston
Walter McAdams	Black	24	M	February 19, 1897	Shelby	Murder	Female, black (wife) (Note: Pregnant when murdered.)	Joseph F. Johnston
Colin Daughdrill	White	26	M	March 5, 1897	Etowah	Murder	Joseph I. Bates, white (Note: Previously murdered railroad yardmaster Armstrong Stewart and was on bond for this murder at time of crime.)	Joseph F. Johnston
John Johnson	Black	25	M	July 30, 1897	Sumter	Murder	A. F. Clark, white (overseer)	Joseph F. Johnston
Pig Newell	Black		M	July 30, 1897	Dallas	Murder	Wright Caldwell, black	Joseph F. Johnston
George Bradley	Black		M	September 17, 1897	Monroe	Murder	Richard Rumbley, white	Joseph F. Johnston
Sam Fields	Black		M	December 10, 1897	Henry (Note: Fields' crime was committed near Dothan, now in Houston County.)	Murder	Female, black (wife)	Joseph F. Johnston
Jim Glover	Black		M	December 10, 1897	Henry	Murder	Mary Jane Williamson, black	Joseph F. Johnston
Brad Beard	Black	14	M	December 17, 1897	Pickens	Rape	Female, 8, white	Joseph F. Johnston
Jefferson Knight	Black		M	January 21, 1898	Mobile	Murder	Frank Dantzler and Joe Tucker (police officer), white	Joseph F. Johnston
Bill Scott	Black		M	February 25, 1898	Hale	Murder-Burglary	Singley family, white (Note: John A. Singley, his wife, and their 10-year-old son.)	Joseph F. Johnston
Thomas Klaus	Black	30	M	September 30, 1898	Lowndes	Murder	Female, black (wife)	Joseph F. Johnston
John Hall	Black		M	January 20, 1899	Montgomery	Murder	Hugh Beiser, white	Joseph F. Johnston
Henry Hall	Black		M	January 20, 1899	Montgomery	Murder	Hugh Beiser, white	Joseph F. Johnston
Isaiah Davis	Black		M	February 3, 1899	Mobile	Murder	Thomas Jones, 58, white	Joseph F. Johnston
Major Terry	Black		M	March 17, 1899	Coffee	Murder-Rape	Mary Van Thomas, 30, white	Joseph F. Johnston
Richard Hale	White		M	March 31, 1899	Pike	Murder-Burglary	Mrs. Ira and Mrs. E. Myers, white	Joseph F. Johnston
Thomas Johnson	White		M	March 31, 1899	Pike	Murder-Burglary	Mrs. Ira and Mrs. E. Myers, white	Joseph F. Johnston
Sam Rivers	Black		M	March 31, 1899	Pike	Murder-Burglary	Mrs. Ira and Mrs. E. Myers, white	Joseph F. Johnston
Frank Cook	Black	23	M	June 30, 1899	Jefferson	Murder-Burglary	John Blackburn, white	Joseph F. Johnston
Alex Hill	Black	25	M	August 4, 1899	Bibb	Murder	Mrs. Rufus Hubbard, white	Joseph F. Johnston
Henry Gardner	Black	18	M	September 15, 1899	Mobile	Rape (Note: "Carnal knowledge.")	Female, <10, white	Joseph F. Johnston

=== 1900s ===
Name	Race	Age	Sex	Date of execution	County	Crime	Victim(s)	Governor
Bill Harris	Black		M	January 10, 1900	Russell	Murder	J. C. Smith, white	William D. Jelks
Will Golson	Black	28	M	February 9, 1900	Jefferson	Murder	Robert Warnock, 40, white (deputy sheriff)	William D. Jelks
Walter Gordon	Black		M	May 18, 1900	Greene	Murder-Robbery	Thomas Burton, white	William D. Jelks
Beauty Ingram	Black	18	M	May 18, 1900	Greene	Murder-Robbery	Thomas Burton, white	William D. Jelks
Elbert Curry	Black		M	May 18, 1900	Talladega	Murder-Robbery	James Pinckney Dobbins, white	William D. Jelks
Vincent Keith	Black		M	May 16, 1901	Talladega	Murder-Robbery	John Houston, black	William J. Sanford
Alonzo Williams	Black		M	June 28, 1901	Jefferson	Murder	John Richardson, white (inmate) (Note: Previously murdered another white inmate named Bob Callahan and was serving a life term for this murder at time of crime.)	William D. Jelks
Frank Miller	White	44	M	June 28, 1901	Jefferson	Murder	J. W. Adams, white (police officer) (Note: Shot A. J. Clayton (white) during a robbery shortly before his arrest and he later died of his injuries. Same crime as Frank Duncan (see 1904).)	William D. Jelks
Jim Brown	Black		M	September 20, 1901	St. Clair	Rape	Dell Garrett, 18, white	William D. Jelks
Will Redding	Black	26	M	December 20, 1901	Jefferson	Murder	Annie Green, black (ex-girlfriend)	William D. Jelks
Jim Winton	Black	25	M	December 20, 1901	Jefferson	Murder	Female, black (wife)	William D. Jelks
Bob Brown	Black	18	M	January 3, 1902	Barbour	Murder	Jim C. McLeod, white	William D. Jelks
Luke Sanders	Black		M	March 6, 1902	Perry	Murder	Mr. Mullins, white	William D. Jelks
Will Harris	Black		M	March 28, 1902	Dallas	Murder-Rape	Mattie Bell, 10, black (Note: Serial rapist, confessed to raping multiple young girls in Wilcox County.)	William D. Jelks
Charner Wood	Black		M	May 22, 1902	Talladega	Murder	Jack and Reuben Bird, 15 (Reuben), white	William D. Jelks
George Wood	Black		M	May 22, 1902	Talladega	Murder	Jack and Reuben Bird, 15 (Reuben), white	William D. Jelks
Walter Bailey	Black	27	M	August 22, 1902	Dallas	Murder	Robert Hunter, black	William D. Jelks
Taylor Charleston	Black	33	M	September 5, 1902	Jefferson	Murder	Will Hardy, black	William D. Jelks
John Sanders	Black		M	September 13, 1902	Perry	Murder	Mr. Mullins, white	William D. Jelks
James Webb	Black	23	M	March 13, 1903	Jefferson	Murder	William P. Walton, 56, white (Birmingham police officer)	William D. Jelks
Will Dorsey	Black	30	M	March 27, 1903	Jefferson	Robbery (Note: Shot and critically wounded victim, who later witnessed the execution.)	David McNamara, white	William D. Jelks
Tom Barsh	Black		M	April 10, 1903	Randolph	Murder	William Birdsong, black	William D. Jelks
Ed Walker	Black		M	April 24, 1903	Bibb	Murder-Rape-Robbery	Mrs. Costello, white	William D. Jelks
William Cooper	Black		M	June 12, 1903	Barbour	Murder	Three people, white and black (Note: Mr. and Mrs. Andrew Dowling (white) and a girl (black).)	William D. Jelks
Sidney King	Black	23	M	July 31, 1903	Jefferson	Murder	Ocie Byron, 18, black (inmate)	William D. Jelks
Alex Means	Black		M	July 31, 1903	Montgomery	Murder	Flem Foster, black	William D. Jelks
Will Starks	Black		M	July 31, 1903	Montgomery	Murder	Flem Foster, black	William D. Jelks
Will Hudson	Black	26	M	August 7, 1903	Jefferson	Robbery	J. B. Messer, white	William D. Jelks
Will Jones	Black		M	August 7, 1903	Jefferson	Robbery	J. B. Messer, white	William D. Jelks
Luther Tinsel	Black		M	August 21, 1903	Geneva	Murder	Mrs. John Owens, white	William D. Jelks
Sherman Stevens	Black		M	September 25, 1903	Randolph	Murder	Lee Stevens, black (father)	William D. Jelks
Felix Hall	Black	35	M	October 22, 1903	Jefferson	Murder	Norwood Clark, white	William D. Jelks
Lon Shaw	Black		M	October 30, 1903	Crenshaw	Murder	Williamson Champion, black	William D. Jelks
Jim Chambers	Black		M	October 30, 1903	Crenshaw	Murder	Williamson Champion, black	William D. Jelks
John Stringer	Black	27	M	December 17, 1903	Jefferson	Murder	Will O'Neall, white (inmate)	William D. Jelks
John Brooks	Black		M	December 31, 1903	Jefferson	Murder-Robbery	William Kinzler, black	William D. Jelks
Charles Sparks	Black		M	March 5, 1904	Lee	Murder	Jack Ingersoll, black (girlfriend's husband)	William D. Jelks
Robert Stone	Black		M	March 25, 1904	Jefferson	Murder	William Henry Thomas, white (guard)	William D. Jelks
Charles Kelly	Black		M	May 13, 1904	Escambia	Murder	Female, black (wife) (Note: Suspected serial killer, thought to have committed murders in Georgia and Florida before moving to Alabama.)	William D. Jelks
Steve Pace	Black		M	May 13, 1904	Jefferson	Murder	Jesse Simmons, black	William D. Jelks
Thomas Plant	Black		M	July 8, 1904	Baldwin	Murder	Will Thomas, black (inmate)	William D. Jelks
Ed Hudson	Black	29	M	September 8, 1904	Mobile	Murder	Minerva Williams, black (love interest)	William D. Jelks
Larkin Johnson	Black		M	September 9, 1904	Shelby	Murder	John Lawler, elderly, white	William D. Jelks
Andrew Burton	Black		M	September 9, 1904	Calhoun	Murder	William R. Richardson, black	William D. Jelks
Tony Jones	Black	20	M	September 9, 1904	Montgomery	Murder	Warren Jones, black (girlfriend's husband)	William D. Jelks
Jeff Allen	Black		M	October 21, 1904	Perry	Murder	Peter Mundin, black (father-in-law)	William D. Jelks
Frank Duncan	White	31	M	November 25, 1904	Jefferson	Murder	G. W. Kirksey, white (Birmingham police officer) (Note: Same crime as Frank Miller (see 1901).)	William D. Jelks
Ira Carter	Black		M	January 14, 1905	Washington	Murder	S. W. Askew, white	William D. Jelks
Jud Braham	Mixed (Note: "Nearly white mulatto.")	23	M	March 10, 1905	Jefferson	Murder	Minnie Crenshaw, black (girlfriend)	William D. Jelks
Alexander Robertson	Black		M	March 10, 1905	Jefferson	Murder	Female, black	William D. Jelks
George Calhoun	Black		M	March 24, 1905	Montgomery	Murder	Annie Calhoun, black (estranged wife)	William D. Jelks
Wilse Pugh	Black		M	June 15, 1905	Elmore	Murder	Female, black (wife)	William D. Jelks
John Collier	Black		M	June 16, 1905	Morgan	Murder-Rape	Belle Bloodworth, 14, white	William D. Jelks
Harvey Smith	Black		M	June 16, 1905	Morgan	Murder-Rape	Belle Bloodworth, 14, white	William D. Jelks
Will Johnson	Black		M	June 16, 1905	Morgan	Murder	E. L. Steele, white (police officer)	William D. Jelks
John Carpenter	Black		M	June 23, 1905	Tuscaloosa	Murder	Stewart Champion, white (overseer)	William D. Jelks
Dan Card	Black		M	June 29, 1905	Barbour	Murder-Robbery	Robert Arrington, white	William D. Jelks
Wesley Hale	Black		M	October 5, 1905	Jefferson	Murder-Robbery	Edgar G. Almon, white (L&N fireman) (Note: Anderson Shelton was also accused of raping two black women in a Birmingham rail yard, but was never tried on this charge.)	William D. Jelks
Anderson Shelton	Black		M	October 27, 1905	Jefferson	Murder-Robbery	Edgar G. Almon, white (L&N fireman)	William D. Jelks
Vance Garner	Black		M	December 29, 1905	Etowah	Murder-Rape	Jane Smith, white	William D. Jelks
Jack Hunter	Black		M	December 29, 1905	Etowah	Murder-Rape	Jane Smith, white	William D. Jelks
Wade Oliver	Black		M	March 2, 1906	Conecuh	Murder	Male, black	William D. Jelks
Jim Walker Jr.	Black	16	M	March 9, 1906	Jefferson	Murder-Robbery	William D. Hill, white	William D. Jelks
Will Stoudenmire	White		M	March 9, 1906	Autauga	Murder	Sim McBride, white (father-in-law)	William D. Jelks
Ed Chappell	Black		M	March 28, 1906	Randolph	Murder	Mr. Satterwhite, white (marshal)	William D. Jelks
Albert Haley	Black		M	April 6, 1906	Lowndes	Murder	Male, white	William D. Jelks
John Patton	Black		M	April 6, 1906	Lowndes	Murder	Male, white	William D. Jelks
James Coleman	Black		M	June 8, 1906	Hale	Murder	Charles Walter, black	William D. Jelks
Cap Dixon	Black		M	June 8, 1906	Marengo	Murder	Male, black	William D. Jelks
Robert Richardson	Black		M	June 29, 1906	Marengo	Murder-Robbery	Dr. Frank L. Foscue, white	William D. Jelks
Earle Fletcher	Black	23	M	August 10, 1906	Jefferson	Murder	Bob Payne, black (inmate) (Note: Serving a 15 year sentence for the previous murder of another black man, Mr. Harris, at time of crime.)	William D. Jelks
Andrew Thomas	White	28	M	March 15, 1907	Mobile	Murder	Harriet Thomas, white (wife)	B. B. Comer
Robert Watts	White		M	April 25, 1907	Marshall	Murder-Robbery	Jerry Winkle, elderly, white	B. B. Comer
Willis McClelland	Black		M	June 21, 1907	Mobile	Murder	Michael McGovern, elderly, white	B. B. Comer
Calvin Coleman	Black		M	July 26, 1907	Montgomery	Murder	J. A. Finley, white	B. B. Comer
Doss Taylor	Black		M	November 15, 1907	Hale	Rape	Ms. Johnson, child, white	B. B. Comer
Henry Thaxton	Black		M	February 10, 1908	Jefferson	Murder-Robbery	Samuel W. Hunstucker, white	B. B. Comer
Arthella DuBose	Black		M	May 1, 1908	Choctaw	Murder	John H. Hodges, 52, white (Note: Also murdered a black woman and her daughter shortly afterwards for having witnessed the crime.)	B. B. Comer
George Watson	Black		M	March 31, 1909	Talladega	Robbery	Clarence Domby, white	B. B. Comer
William Stevenson	White	27	M	October 22, 1909	Crenshaw	Murder	Gertrude Vann, 18, white (stepdaughter) (Note: Serial killer, also murdered his wife during the same crime and previously served time in the state mines for another murder in Calhoun County.)	B. B. Comer
Lewis Balaam	Black	21	M	October 22, 1909	Clarke	Murder	F. L. Wainwright, white (deputy sheriff)	B. B. Comer
Tom Roberson	White		M	December 17, 1909	Franklin	Murder	Nannie Roberson and Mrs. J. W. Clark, white (wife and mother-in-law)	B. B. Comer

=== 1910s ===
Name	Race	Age	Sex	Date of execution	County	Crime	Victim(s)	Governor
Ed Howard	Black		M	February 4, 1910	Hale	Murder-Robbery	Robert W. Drake, white	B. B. Comer
Jim Powell	Black		M	March 25, 1910	Jefferson	Murder-Robbery	John Simms, black	B. B. Comer
Joe Rodgers	Black		M	March 25, 1910	Jefferson	Murder-Robbery	John Simms, black	B. B. Comer
Eugene Twitty	Black		M	May 20, 1910	Jefferson	Murder-Robbery	Samuel W. Hunstucker, white	B. B. Comer
Freeman Harrell	Black	21	M	June 9, 1910	Dallas	Murder	Nancy Toodles, 15, black (love interest)	B. B. Comer
Joe McDaniel	Black		M	June 16, 1910	Hale	Murder-Robbery	Robert W. Drake, white	B. B. Comer
Wiley Young	Black		M	June 21, 1910	Chilton	Murder	Cleave Houldrich, white	B. B. Comer
Tolley Mason	Black		M	August 13, 1910	Bibb	Murder	Richard T. Meigs, white	B. B. Comer
Bill Walker	Black		M	June 2, 1911	Mobile	Murder	Jesse Brown, white (Note: Also confessed to raping two women, one white and one black.)	Emmet O'Neal
George Lige	Black		M	July 28, 1911	Etowah	Murder	Clarence McCalley, black	Emmet O'Neal
Henry Winston	Black		M	December 22, 1911	Bibb	Rape-Burglary	Ms. Filgo, white	Emmet O'Neal
Walter Bryer	Black		M	January 12, 1912	Montgomery	Murder	Chloe Brown, elderly, black	Emmet O'Neal
J. Lawrence Odom	White		M	February 19, 1912	Mobile	Murder	Three people, white (Note: 19-year-old Charles Goland, 16-year-old David Gartham, and "aged farmer" Joseph Stokes.)	Emmet O'Neal
John Sims	Black		M	May 17, 1912	Bibb	Murder	Joe James and John Going, black (Note: Serial killer, serving a life term for murder at time of crime. Claimed to have a killed a dozen men.)	Emmet O'Neal
Phillip Travis	Black		M	May 31, 1912	Perry	Murder	Fox Hall, white	Emmet O'Neal
Frank Richardson	Black	29	M	July 9, 1912	Tuscaloosa	Murder	Tom Cooper, white	Emmet O'Neal
Armistead White	Black		M	August 23, 1912	Jefferson	Murder	Jim Miner, white (inmate) (Note: Serving a life term for the murder of Robert Bibb in Montgomery County at time of crime.)	Emmet O'Neal
Charles White	Black	40	M	December 13, 1912	Coosa	Murder-Robbery	Dock Maxwell, black	Emmet O'Neal
Will Wright	Mixed (Note: "Negro-Indian ancestry".)		M	January 3, 1913	DeKalb	Murder	Will Murphy, white (posse member)	Emmet O'Neal
Albert Warren	Black		M	February 14, 1913	Pike	Attempted rape	Alice Graves, white	Emmet O'Neal
William Watson	White		M	March 21, 1913	Jefferson	Murder	John Holland, black (Note: First case in Alabama's state history of a white defendant being executed for the murder of a black victim.)	Emmet O'Neal
Arthur Jones	White		M	March 21, 1913	Jefferson	Murder	John Holland, black	Emmet O'Neal
C. Walter Jones	White		M	April 4, 1913	Montgomery	Murder	Sloan Rowan, white	Emmet O'Neal
Arnold Gilmer	White		M	April 4, 1913	Montgomery	Murder	Lucille Tiplett, white (girlfriend)	Emmet O'Neal
Coleman German	Black		M	April 4, 1913	Montgomery	Murder	Pet Robinson, black (girlfriend/sister-in-law)	Emmet O'Neal
John Adams	Black		M	April 4, 1913	Montgomery	Murder	T. W. Berry, white (police officer)	Emmet O'Neal
Walter Jones	White	24	M	April 4, 1913	Jefferson	Murder	Lawrence B. Evans, white (Note: Also involved in the murder of John Holland (see his aforementioned brother, Arthur Jones) and was sentenced to life imprisonment before being tried and convicted of Evans' murder.)	Emmet O'Neal
Thomas Simon	Black		M	June 13, 1913	Hale	Murder	Female, black (wife)	Emmet O'Neal
Aaron Sharp	Black	30	M	June 27, 1913	Hale	Murder	Female, black (wife)	Emmet O'Neal
Robert Johnston	Black		M	June 27, 1913	Pickens	Murder	Sam Howard, black	Emmet O'Neal
Hill Granberry	Black		M	February 6, 1914	Lee	Murder	Maria and Ariana Aldridge, black	Emmet O'Neal
Perry Mackey	Black		M	June 26, 1914	Bibb	Murder	Will Anderson, white (inmate) (Note: Serving a life term for murder at time of crime.)	Emmet O'Neal
Walter Pryor	Black		M	June 26, 1914	Etowah	Murder	George F. Quest, white	Emmet O'Neal
John Ragland	Black		M	August 21, 1914	Morgan	Murder	Female, black (wife)	Emmet O'Neal
Henry Wright	Black		M	October 30, 1914	Tallapoosa	Murder	J. Fletcher Turner, white	Emmet O'Neal
Luther Sims	Black	18	M	October 30, 1914	Tallapoosa	Murder	J. Fletcher Turner, white	Emmet O'Neal
Benny Ward	Black		M	October 30, 1914	Jefferson	Robbery	Aaron Pollock, white	Emmet O'Neal
Wash Gray	Black		M	October 30, 1914	Jefferson	Robbery	Aaron Pollock, white	Emmet O'Neal
Lewis Johnson	Black	50	M	March 12, 1915	Montgomery	Murder	William H. Underwood, white	Charles Henderson
Syd Jones	Black		M	June 25, 1915	Jefferson	Murder	Cleave Waters, white (inmate) (Note: Serial killer, serving a life sentence for murder at time of crime and left a note confessing to 13 other murders.)	Charles Henderson
Lon Carter	Black		M	June 25, 1915	Jefferson	Murder	Female, black (wife)	Charles Henderson
Tim Sharp	White		M	June 25, 1915	Calhoun	Murder	William T. Dillard and James W. Dashwood, white (police officers)	Charles Henderson
Early Morris	Black		M	July 2, 1915	Tuscaloosa	Murder	Lizzie Morris, black (wife)	Charles Henderson
George James	White	20	M	August 6, 1915	Cullman	Murder	George Claiborne, white	Charles Henderson
Robert Watkins	Black		M	August 6, 1915	Conecuh	Murder	Mary Lasseter, white	Charles Henderson
John Salter	Black	23	M	August 6, 1915	Conecuh	Murder	Mary Lasseter, white	Charles Henderson
Millard Carpenter	Black		M	August 6, 1915	Jefferson	Murder	John T. Camp, white	Charles Henderson
Pomp Dickerson	Black		M	August 27, 1915	Lee	Murder	Female, black (wife)	Charles Henderson
Lamar Lightner	Black		M	May 12, 1916	Montgomery	Murder	Will Robinson, black (Note: Also committed another previous murder.)	Charles Henderson
Jesse White	Black		M	May 12, 1916	Jefferson	Murder	Dr. C. C. Ferrell, white	Charles Henderson
Moses Cunningham	Black		M	July 14, 1916	Mobile	Rape	Irene Richardson, white	Charles Henderson
Fisher Brooks	Black		M	August 3, 1917	Mobile	Murder-Robbery	Julia Mae Hess, white	Charles Henderson
Lige Skipper	Black	35	M	October 26, 1917	Henry	Murder-Robbery	John A. James, white	Charles Henderson
Howard Richardson	Black		M	January 4, 1918	Baldwin	Murder	William Obermark, white	Charles Henderson
Walter Hardley	Black		M	June 18, 1918	Cullman	Murder	W. T. Jones, white	Charles Henderson
Albert Sanders	Black		M	July 19, 1918	Mobile	Murder-Robbery	Julia Mae Hess, white	Charles Henderson
Lewis Russell	Black		M	August 12, 1918	Jefferson	Murder	John Holiness, black (father-in-law)	Charles Henderson
Ernest Spruill	Black		M	September 11, 1918	Pickens	Murder	George Lawrence, white	Charles Henderson
Charles Mitchell	Black		M	November 8, 1918	Lawrence	Murder	Nelson Davis, black	Charles Henderson
Lucius Carter	Black		M	November 9, 1918	Chambers	Murder	Mrs. Allen, elderly, white	Charles Henderson
Jim Tucker	Black		M	November 9, 1918	Chambers	Murder	Female, black (mother-in-law)	Charles Henderson
Dock Bigham	White		M	June 27, 1919	Tuscaloosa	Murder	Palmer M. Watts, white (sheriff) (Note: Previously convicted of murdering a black man, Sonny Pruitt, but escaped the state prison while serving time.)	Thomas Kilby
Frank Ezell	Black		M	December 19, 1919	Monroe	Murder	William H. Northrup, white	Thomas Kilby
Brown Ezell	Black		M	December 19, 1919	Monroe	Murder	William H. Northrup, white	Thomas Kilby

=== 1920s ===
Name	Race	Age	Sex	Date of execution	County	Crime	Victim(s)	Governor
Will Stover	Black		M	July 16, 1920	Jefferson	Murder-Robbery	Will Washington, elderly, black	Thomas Kilby
Edgar Caldwell	Black		M	July 30, 1920	Calhoun	Murder	Cecil Linten, white	Thomas Kilby
Robert Edwards	Black	21	M	January 21, 1921	Mobile	Murder-Robbery	Sam Block, white	Thomas Kilby
Ernest Williams	Black		M	January 21, 1921	Clarke	Murder	Travis Dawson, white	Thomas Kilby
Dan Charley	Black		M	February 4, 1921	Mobile	Murder-Robbery	Sam Block, white	Thomas Kilby
John Keith	Black	22	M	July 2, 1921	Talladega	Murder	Harriet Welch, black (aunt)	Thomas Kilby
Richard Davis	Black	72	M	August 26, 1921	Mobile	Murder	Lizzie Davis, 50, black	Thomas Kilby
John Whiteside	Black		M	August 26, 1921	Jefferson	Murder-Robbery	J. L. Bourgeoise and Lacey Murphree, 73 and 15, white	Thomas Kilby
Will Morton	Black		M	August 26, 1921	Jefferson	Robbery (Note: Shot victim, but he survived and later witnessed the execution.)	J. M. Cannon, white	Thomas Kilby
Clyde Thomas	Black	35	M	September 15, 1921	Bibb	Murder-Rape	Annie Lee Wallace, 14, white	Thomas Kilby
Henry Barnett	Black		M	December 2, 1921	Montgomery	Murder-Robbery	Davis Anderson, white	Thomas Kilby
Willie Williams	Black		M	December 2, 1921	Montgomery	Murder-Robbery	Davis Anderson, white	Thomas Kilby
Teague Cunningham	Black		M	June 16, 1922	Talladega	Murder	Eugene Hobbs, white (police officer)	Thomas Kilby
George Howze	Black	23	M	June 23, 1922	Pike	Murder	R. L. Corbitt, white (Coast Line detective)	Thomas Kilby
Forrest Scott	Black		M	July 14, 1922	Mobile	Murder	Female, black (wife)	Thomas Kilby
Walter Delaney	Black		M	July 14, 1922	Mobile	Murder-Robbery	Sam Block, white	Thomas Kilby
Ephriam High	Black		M	September 1, 1922	Bibb	Robbery	J. M. Arnold, elderly, white	Thomas Kilby
Aaron Howard	Black	19	M	November 3, 1922	Macon	Murder	Frank E. Bagby Jr., 19, white	Thomas Kilby
Willie Golson	Black	30	M	June 8, 1923	Jefferson	Rape	Two females, white (Note: Serial rapist, confessed to raping 10 women (nine white and one black) in Knoxville, Tennessee.)	William W. Brandon
Ben Moore	Black		M	June 8, 1923	Chambers	Murder-Robbery	Alexander Taylor, white	William W. Brandon
George Robertson	Black	54	M	March 7, 1924	Shelby	Murder-Robbery	William Murphy, 55, white (Note: Serial killer, confessed to eight other murders but gave no details.)	William W. Brandon
Bennie Cantelou	Black		M	March 21, 1924	Montgomery	Murder-Burglary	Susan B. Mastin, 74, white	William W. Brandon
Gordon Fincher	White	31	M	July 11, 1924	Talladega	Murder-Rape	Maybelle McCullough, 16, white	William W. Brandon
Porter Myhand	Black	25	M	August 8, 1924	Russell	Murder	Sophia Ingram, elderly, black (Note: Also murdered her husband, Henry Ingram.)	William W. Brandon
Alonzo Myhand	Black	28	M	August 8, 1924	Russell	Murder	Sophia Ingram, elderly, black	William W. Brandon
Clarence Bailey	White	26	M	February 27, 1925	Montgomery	Murder	James Culpepper, white (inmate) (Note: Murdered Culpepper in Kilby Prison while serving a life term for the murder of Francis Sudduth (white) in Speigner Prison.)	William W. Brandon
Allen Germany	Black	45	M	March 6, 1925	Jefferson	Murder	Jimmie Germany, black (wife)	William W. Brandon
Willie Green	Black		M	June 12, 1925	Jefferson	Murder	Female, black (wife)	William W. Brandon
J. C. Williams	Black		M	July 3, 1925	Pike	Murder-Rape	Rose Brown, black (Note: Serial killer, escaped from prison in Georgia while serving a life term for murder and murdered two other black women in Alabama before Brown, Magnolia Jones in Montgomery County and Mattie Mae Williams in Pike County.)	William W. Brandon
John Milton	Black	36	M	July 31, 1925	Jefferson	Murder	Mrs. Blaney Collins, white (Note: Also murdered her 8-month-old child Maedron Collins.)	William W. Brandon
Harry Mack	Black		M	August 21, 1925	Fayette	Rape	Female, 16, white	William W. Brandon
Sam Greenhill	Black	36	M	October 9, 1925	Lauderdale (Federal) (Note: Crime committed at Nitrate Plant No. 1 in Colbert County.)	Murder	Harry S. White, 38, white (security guard)	William W. Brandon
Murray Rankin	Black		M	January 22, 1926	Conecuh	Rape	Female, white	William W. Brandon
Herbert Julius	Black	27	M	March 5, 1926	Montgomery	Murder	William A. Sinreich, white	William W. Brandon
Campbell Starks	Black	29	M	June 25, 1926	Mobile	Murder	Christopher Dean, white (police officer)	William W. Brandon
Frank Owens	Black		M	September 24, 1926	Jefferson	Robbery	Richard Warner and L. M. Watkins, white	William W. Brandon

== Electrocution ==
On March 1, 1927, Alabama officially replaced local hanging with centralized electrocution. The state's new electric chair, nicknamed "Yellow Mama" for being painted bright yellow, was installed in an official execution chamber at Kilby Prison. It was built by Ed Mason, an English cabinetmaker serving a long sentence there.

Name	Race	Age	Sex	Date of execution	County	Crime	Victim(s)	Governor
Horace DeVaughn	Black	35	M	April 8, 1927	Jefferson	Murder-Robbery	Auburn B. Moore and Ruby Thornton, white (Note: Previously convicted of murdering a black woman in Virginia and served 10 years in prison there.)	Bibb Graves
William Virgil Murphy	White	37	M	April 23, 1927	Houston	Murder	Female, white (wife)	Bibb Graves
Clyde Reese Bachelor	White	26	M	July 15, 1927	Elmore	Murder	Lamar Smith, white (father-in-law)	Bibb Graves
Sam Hall	Black		M	September 9, 1927 (Note: Execution witnessed by Governor Graves.)	Autauga	Murder	Kate Hall, black (estranged wife)	Bibb Graves
Jeff Coleman	Black		M	December 16, 1927	Jefferson	Murder	A. A. Manley, white	Bibb Graves
Bob Eatman	Black		M	December 30, 1927	Hale	Murder	Three victims, black (Note: His wife, her mother, and her brother.)	Bibb Graves
Charlie Washington	Black		M	March 9, 1928	Jefferson	Murder	Louis Wallock, white (Note: Also confessed to three robberies and two burglaries. Two other men were serving prison sentences for one of the confessed burglaries.)	Bibb Graves
John Burchfield	White	25	M	March 9, 1928	Chambers	Murder	Howard Dudley, 15, white	Bibb Graves
Isiah Brooks	Black		M	April 6, 1928	Crenshaw	Murder-Robbery	I. R. Wood, white	Bibb Graves
Robert Shelton	Black		M	June 15, 1928	Mobile	Murder	Jane Shelton, black (wife)	Bibb Graves
Rodell Peoples	Black		M	July 20, 1928	Jefferson	Murder	E. T. Lewis, white (Birmingham traffic officer)	Bibb Graves
Dock Jiles	Black		M	March 15, 1929	Lee	Murder	Willie Ogletree, black	Bibb Graves
Will Carter	Black	26	M	July 26, 1929	Jefferson	Murder	Sam Harris, white	Bibb Graves
Charles Harris	Black	38	M	August 23, 1929	Barbour	Murder	Jack Hines, white	Bibb Graves
Silena Gilmore	Black	34	F	January 24, 1930	Jefferson	Murder	Horace Johnson, white (Note: Previously charged with the murder of her husband, Leroy Johnson, but was acquitted.)	Bibb Graves
Jack Jarvis	White	28	M	April 11, 1930	Mobile	Murder-Robbery	Claude D. Hurt, white (Note: Also murdered an accomplice, Willie Hansen.)	Bibb Graves
Roy Lee Miles	Black	29	M	June 20, 1930	Bullock	Murder	J. F. Barbaree, white (deputy sheriff)	Bibb Graves
Edgar Harris	Black		M	June 20, 1930	Marengo	Murder-Robbery	James Richmond Moss, 77, white	Bibb Graves
Jack Brown	Black		M	June 20, 1930	Marengo	Murder-Robbery	James Richmond Moss, 77, white	Bibb Graves
Cleveland Malone	Black		M	February 27, 1931	Talladega	Rape	Female, white	Benjamin M. Miller
Moses Daniels	Black	19	M	March 27, 1931	Montgomery	Rape	Female, white (Note: Also admitted to attacking another white woman near the state capital.)	Benjamin M. Miller
Spencer Bates	Black	27	M	May 29, 1931	Sumter	Murder	Tom McKinstry, 35, white	Benjamin M. Miller
William Stokes	Black		M	June 10, 1931	St. Clair	Murder	Vester Myers, white (Note: Also murdered two black men.)	Benjamin M. Miller
Charlie Williams	Black		M	January 15, 1932	Mobile	Rape	Female, 6, white	Benjamin M. Miller
Richard Ashe	Black	24	M	January 15, 1932	Hale	Murder	Female, black	Benjamin M. Miller
Isaac Mims	Black		M	March 11, 1932	Lowndes	Murder-Robbery	John Clark, white	Benjamin M. Miller
Percy Irvin	Black		M	March 11, 1932	Lowndes	Murder-Robbery	John Clark, white	Benjamin M. Miller
Charlie Jones	Black		M	February 3, 1933	Jefferson	Murder	Female, black	Benjamin M. Miller
Willie James Johnson	Black		M	February 3, 1933	Jefferson	Murder	Jack Hartzog, white	Benjamin M. Miller
George Meadows	Black	27	M	October 27, 1933	Montgomery	Rape-Robbery	Female, white	Benjamin M. Miller
Solomon Roper	Black	24	M	February 9, 1934	Dallas	Murder	Page Brazier, black	Benjamin M. Miller
Ernest Waller	Black	21	M	February 9, 1934	Dallas	Murder	Daisy Montgomery, black (girlfriend)	Benjamin M. Miller
Bennie Foster	Black	21	M	February 9, 1934	Dallas	Murder	Clarence Sidney McCain, 58, white	Benjamin M. Miller
Hardie White	Black	32	M	February 9, 1934	Mobile	Murder-Robbery	Luther Williams, white	Benjamin M. Miller
John Thompson	Black	38	M	February 9, 1934	Mobile	Murder	Henry Bloom, white	Benjamin M. Miller
Ed Thomas	Black		M	March 1, 1935	Hale	Murder-Robbery	Ray Johnson, white	Bibb Graves
Blake Ruff	Black		M	March 22, 1935	Clay	Murder	Four people, black (Note: His love interest, her father, her brother, and her boyfriend.)	Bibb Graves
Johnny Preston	Black	36	M	February 21, 1936	Lee	Murder-Rape	Eloise Swanson, 10, black (niece)	Bibb Graves
Robert Dudley	Black	27	M	March 20, 1936	Jefferson	Murder	Elijah Crawford, black	Bibb Graves
Eddie Roper	Black	30	M	March 20, 1936	Jefferson	Murder	John Donegan, white	Bibb Graves
Henry Peterson	Black	29	M	March 27, 1936	Montgomery	Murder	Rosa Lee Knox, black (common-law wife)	Bibb Graves
Willie E. Bynum	Black	26	M	April 17, 1936	Montgomery	Murder	Lee Mason, black (inmate) (Note: Murdered at Kilby Prison, both inmates.)	Bibb Graves
Jimmie Stewart	Black	33	M	May 15, 1936	Montgomery	Murder	Hannah Langford, black (mother-in-law)	Bibb Graves
Waddie Cosey	Black	30	M	May 15, 1936	Morgan	Murder	Otto Dilbeck, 19, white	Bibb Graves
Joseph Gast	White	37	M	June 5, 1936	Talladega	Murder	Lillie Vera Gast, white (wife)	Bibb Graves
Gabriel Waters	Black	19	M	June 12, 1936	Sumter	Murder	Lock Sheffield, white	Bibb Graves
Tyrie Harrell	Black	44	M	June 12, 1936	Elmore	Murder	Chester Estes, 29, white	Bibb Graves
Wesley Vincent	White	20	M	June 12, 1936	Jefferson	Murder	Forrest J. Harris, white (police officer)	Bibb Graves
Walter Miller	Black	38	M	June 19, 1936	Madison	Murder-Rape	Vivian Woodward, 19, white	Bibb Graves
Elmer N. Arrant	White	34	M	June 19, 1936	Lowndes	Murder	Mr. and Mrs. John E. Norman, white	Bibb Graves
Tom Perkins	Black	29	M	July 3, 1936	Monroe	Murder	Clifton McNeil, 24, white	Bibb Graves
A. B. Smiley	Black	30	M	July 10, 1936	Elmore	Murder	Pete Berry, black (inmate) (Note: Murdered at Speigner Prison, both inmates.)	Bibb Graves
Oscar Patterson	Black	24	M	July 31, 1936	Coosa	Rape	Bettie Jean Hawkins, 7, white	Bibb Graves
Ed Lee Summerville	Black	35	M	August 7, 1936	Lowndes	Murder	Bert Clarence Johnson, 40, white (chief deputy)	Bibb Graves
Edgar Prude Skelton	White	36	M	January 29, 1937	Tuscaloosa	Murder-Robbery	Rev. John Pate, white (Note: Previously charged with killing Franklin's cousin Charlie Parker, but the case was nol prossed.)	Bibb Graves
James Victor Franklin	White	31	M	February 26, 1937	Tuscaloosa	Murder-Robbery	Rev. John Pate, white	Bibb Graves
Roosevelt Collins	Black	31	M	June 11, 1937	Calhoun	Rape	Female, 25, white	Bibb Graves
Arthur Oliver	White	46	M	September 10, 1937	Elmore	Murder	Vidie Oliver, white (wife)	Bibb Graves
R. P. Vaughn	Black	20	M	January 28, 1938	Mobile	Murder-Robbery	Sam Sanne, 57, white	Bibb Graves
Frank Millhouse	Black	18	M	January 28, 1938	Mobile	Murder-Robbery	Sam Sanne, 57, white	Bibb Graves
Gary Young	Black	41	M	July 22, 1938	Mobile	Murder	Charles Emanuel, white	Bibb Graves
Mack Davidson	Black	28	M	July 22, 1938	Baldwin	Robbery (Note: Also beat the victim unconscious and left him for dead.)	T. R. Hunt, white	Bibb Graves
Willie James Whitfield	Black	17	M	August 19, 1938	Montgomery	Murder	Fred Heins, white	Bibb Graves
Curtis Cobb	Black	22	M	August 19, 1938	Jefferson	Rape	Ethel Weaver, 11, white	Bibb Graves
Jimmie Brown	Black	25	M	November 25, 1938	Jefferson	Rape-Robbery	Female, white (Note: Previously convicted of attempted rape and served time in prison.)	Bibb Graves
Conrad Vaughan	White	27	M	November 25, 1938	Jefferson	Murder	Annie Mae Adkins, white (girlfriend)	Bibb Graves
Adolph Smith	Black	23	M	December 30, 1938	Geneva	Robbery (Note: Also attempted to murder the victim by slashing his throat as he begged for his life.)	Ivy Sammons, white	Bibb Graves
Fred Ware	Black	24	M	February 17, 1939	Randolph	Rape	Female, white	Frank M. Dixon
Joe Lee Kennedy	Black	33	M	March 17, 1939	Jefferson	Murder	Leo Johnson, black	Frank M. Dixon
Edward Wimbush	Black	22	M	March 17, 1939	Jefferson	Murder-Robbery	J. O. Hall, white	Frank M. Dixon
Tom Williams	Black	28	M	April 14, 1939	Elmore	Murder	Charlie Herren, 60, white	Frank M. Dixon
Charles White	Black	51	M	June 9, 1939	Pike	Rape	Female, 20, white	Frank M. Dixon
Grady Tubbs	Black	21	M	June 9, 1939	Hale	Murder-Rape	Gola Zulla Lyles and Horace J. Nash, white	Frank M. Dixon
Joseph Frazier	Black	22	M	June 9, 1939	Marengo	Murder	Carolina Frazier, black (grandmother)	Frank M. Dixon
Ray Anderson	Black	26	M	June 9, 1939	Jefferson	Rape	Female, white	Frank M. Dixon
Robert Sanders	Black	37	M	July 7, 1939	Montgomery	Murder	Willie Frank Talley, 49, white	Frank M. Dixon
Mack Jackson	Black	23	M	August 18, 1939	Jefferson	Rape	Female, white	Frank M. Dixon
Calvin Tucker	Black	24	M	February 16, 1940	Mobile	Murder	Hercules Burage, black	Frank M. Dixon
Lonnie Avery	Black	32	M	March 15, 1940	Bibb	Murder	Female, black (estranged wife)	Frank M. Dixon
David Williams	Black	22	M	March 29, 1940	Jefferson	Murder	Newt Garrison, white	Frank M. Dixon
Mack Jackson	Black	28	M	March 29, 1940	Jefferson	Murder	Female, black (common-law wife)	Frank M. Dixon
Herman Bell	Black	23	M	March 29, 1940	Mobile	Rape	Female, 45, white	Frank M. Dixon
Judge Ragland	Black	34	M	May 3, 1940	Lee	Murder-Robbery	Robert Capps, white	Frank M. Dixon
David McGuire	Black	25	M	May 24, 1940	Jefferson	Murder-Robbery	J. O. Hall, white	Frank M. Dixon
Willie C. Williams	White	31	M	June 14, 1940	Jefferson	Murder	J. T. Moser, white (detective)	Frank M. Dixon
Willie James Brandon	Black	23	M	August 9, 1940	Coffee	Rape	Female, white	Frank M. Dixon
William Clark	Black	18	M	January 17, 1941	Limestone	Rape	Mrs. Eugene Clem, white	Frank M. Dixon
Julius Jackson	Black	29	M	July 11, 1941	Talladega	Murder-Rape-Robbery	Leamon Shields and a woman, white	Frank M. Dixon
Frank Bass	Black	22	M	August 8, 1941	Morgan	Burglary (Note: Also attempted to murder the victim by beating her with a hammer.)	Virginia Canterbury, white	Frank M. Dixon
Robert Jones	Black	24	M	August 8, 1941	Greene	Murder	Mellie Jones, black (wife)	Frank M. Dixon
Albert Dyer	White	34	M	January 9, 1942	Jefferson	Murder	A woman (estranged wife) and Dorothy Lymance, 18 and 22, white	Frank M. Dixon
Dock Powell	Black	27	M	January 23, 1942	Clay	Murder-Rape	Mary Webster Garrison, 45, white	Frank M. Dixon
Bud Phelps Herring	Black	69	M	March 13, 1942	Coffee	Murder-Rape	Eunice Peacock, 33, white	Frank M. Dixon
Esker W. Gipson	White	32	M	March 13, 1942	Mobile	Murder	Six people, white (Note: His wife Oletha (30) and their children Robert Esker (6), Huey P. Long (5), Frank O'Neal (4), Margaret (3), and Marie Elease (6 months).)	Frank M. Dixon
Ed Hayes Jr.	Black	34	M	May 1, 1942	Marengo	Murder-Robbery	Mr. and Mrs. A. T. Jackson, 47 and 39, white	Frank M. Dixon
Clarence Hardy	Black	42	M	May 1, 1942	Jefferson	Murder	E. H. Akers, 41, white (Note: Also admitted to robbing two black men, leaving one for dead and attempting to kill the other.)	Frank M. Dixon
William N. Snead	Black	34	M	June 26, 1942	Jefferson	Rape-Burglary	Female, 16, white (Note: Serial rapist, committed several other attacks.)	Frank M. Dixon
William M. Patterson	Black	25	M	June 26, 1942	Jefferson	Murder	Mattie Patterson, black (estranged wife)	Frank M. Dixon
Paul Mealer	White	39	M	July 10, 1942	Tuscaloosa	Murder	Laura Mealer, white (wife)	Frank M. Dixon
Haywood Bossie	Black	24	M	February 19, 1943	Marengo	Murder	John C. Reed, white (Faunsdale town marshal)	Chauncey Sparks
Frank Johnson	Black	24	M	June 4, 1943	Jefferson	Rape	Female, 18, white (Note: Also committed two attempted rapes.)	Chauncey Sparks
Leroy Goldsmith	Black	38	M	August 6, 1943	Montgomery	Murder	James Davis, 65, white (Note: Mistaken for Robert Smith (black), who was "his rival for the affections of a woman".)	Chauncey Sparks
Curtis Robinson	Black	20	M	August 13, 1943	Mobile	Rape	Female, white	Chauncey Sparks
Henry Daniels Jr.	Black	20	M	August 13, 1943	Mobile	Rape	Female, white	Chauncey Sparks
Lewis Mitchell	Black	28	M	March 24, 1944	Montgomery	Murder	Jesse Davis, black (love interest/ inmate) (Note: Murdered at Kilby Prison, both inmates. Mitchell was previously sentenced to death for another murder but commuted to life. They were part of a "homosexual ring" within the prison.)	Chauncey Sparks
Joe Vernon	Black	38	M	November 3, 1944	Jefferson	Murder-Robbery	Bennie Montgomery, white	Chauncey Sparks
Daniel T. Reedy	White	19	M	March 16, 1945	Jefferson	Rape-Robbery-Kidnap	Pearl Brasher, 37, white (Note: Serial rapists. Hockenberry, convicted of assaulting a woman in 1942, had escaped with Reedy from Gallinger Hospital in Washington, D.C. with a stolen car; the two went to New Orleans where they kidnapped 19-year-old Mrs. T. H. Bohler before going to Alabama through Mississippi, committing purse theft in several towns en route; Bohler was released shortly before the kidnap and assault of Brasher. Both were diagnosed with psychopathy.)	Chauncey Sparks
Joseph H. Hockenberry	White	22	M	March 16, 1945	Jefferson	Rape-Robbery-Kidnap	Pearl Brasher, 37, white	Chauncey Sparks
Ed Lucky Patton	Black	45	M	July 20, 1945	Hale	Murder	James C. Findlay and John Parker, 37 and 39, white	Chauncey Sparks
Peter Paul Hall	Black	23	M	January 18, 1946	Barbour	Murder-Rape	Ethel Luck, 17, white	Chauncey Sparks
Ernest Johnson	Black	17	M	January 25, 1946	Hale	Murder-Robbery	Jack T. Walton, 63, white	Chauncey Sparks
Richard Brown	Black	18	M	February 1, 1946	Hale	Murder-Robbery	Jack T. Walton, 63, white	Chauncey Sparks
Elbert Burns	White	65	M	March 15, 1946	Jefferson	Murder	Jake Prescott, white (Note: Previously killed Dr. W. H. Godwin with his brother and twice convicted of second-degree murder with both convictions being overturned with an ultimate manslaughter conviction with prison time served.)	Chauncey Sparks
Robert S. Pilley	White	26	M	April 19, 1946	Jefferson	Murder-Robbery	George Nolan Goatley, white	Chauncey Sparks
Fred Hicks	Black	33	M	May 24, 1946	Hale	Murder-Robbery	Fanny Webster, black	Chauncey Sparks
Lester Wingard	Black		M	May 24, 1946	Montgomery	Murder	Herbert Athey, white	Chauncey Sparks
Joe Mincey	Black	30	M	July 14, 1946	Pike	Murder-Robbery	Jimmy John Hanson, white	Chauncey Sparks
William Edgar Alston	White	41	M	August 16, 1946	Walker	Murder	Christine Alston, white (estranged wife) (Note: Previously killed Melvin Kimball with his twin brother Julian Alston and both sentenced to life but later paroled.)	Chauncey Sparks
Johnnie B. Smith	Black	24	M	December 13, 1946	Tuscaloosa	Rape	Female, middle-aged, white	Chauncey Sparks
Booker T. Brooks	Black	31	M	March 14, 1947	Chambers	Murder	Leslie Brooks, white (Note: Booker Brooks was pursuing his wife and shot Leslie Brooks after he was awakened by the fight.)	Jim Folsom
Israel Garrett	Black	45	M	May 23, 1947	Russell	Murder-Rape	Ruby Tolliver, black (Note: Previously convicted of attempted rape and of the murder of his wife and served prison terms for both crimes.)	Jim Folsom
John Henry Munson Jr.	Black	28	M	March 19, 1948	Jefferson	Murder-Robbery	Gertrude Geer, black	Jim Folsom
Noel J. Grant	White	40	M	March 19, 1948	Baldwin	Murder	Gertha Grant, white (wife)	Jim Folsom
Phillip Cobb	Black	24	M	March 11, 1949	Montgomery	Murder	Jesse Porter, black (boyfriend) (Note: Murdered at Kilby Prison, both inmates. Cobb had previously killed his wife and was sentenced to death but received a commutation to life.)	Jim Folsom
Perry Lee Haygood	Black	26	M	March 18, 1949	Jefferson	Murder-Robbery	W. J. Trotter, white	Jim Folsom
Buster Snead	Black	42	M	March 25, 1949	Bibb	Murder-Burglary	Ellen Mason, black	Jim Folsom
J. C. Winters	Black	20	M	August 12, 1949	Elmore	Murder	Clyde A. Peak Jr., 15, white (Note: Sexually assaulted Peak before killing him.)	Jim Folsom
Nehemiah Green	Black	26	M	August 12, 1949	Jefferson	Murder-Robbery	Thomas C. Solomon, white	Jim Folsom
Charlie Smith	Black	25	M	May 26, 1950	Mobile	Murder-Robbery	Monroe Young Jackson, white	Jim Folsom
Joe Keith	Black	29	M	July 21, 1950	Limestone	Murder	Queenie Clements, 80, white	Jim Folsom
Homer Garland Odom	White	23	M	July 21, 1950	Jefferson	Murder-Robbery	William Alexander McDonald, 71, white	Jim Folsom
Claude B. Sims	Black	20	M	July 21, 1950	Jefferson	Murder-Robbery	John Harden, white	Jim Folsom
Andrew Lee Smith	Black	31	M	May 2, 1952	Jefferson	Murder	Stanford R. Howton and Sam Linn, white (Graysville police chief and constable)	Gordon Persons
Cooper Drake	Black	31	M	May 2, 1952	Shelby	Murder-Rape	Female and male, 4 (male), white (Note: Adult woman raped, son killed.)	Gordon Persons
Levert Forrest	Black	27	M	May 9, 1952	Mobile	Murder	Ulysses Alberson, white	Gordon Persons
Desmond Miles	White	35	M	October 10, 1952	Covington	Murder	James Alton Hill, white	Gordon Persons
Reuben Myhand	Black	20	M	August 28, 1953	Geneva	Rape	Shelby June Edmondson, 12, white	Gordon Persons
Earle Dennison	White	54	F	September 4, 1953	Elmore	Murder	Shirley Diann Weldon, 2, white (niece) (Note: Also murdered an earlier child of the Weldons, 2-year-old Polly Ann.)	Gordon Persons
Will Hardie	Black	54	M	January 22, 1954	Tuscaloosa	Murder	J. Foster King and Homer F. Hubbard, white (Tuscaloosa city detective and patrolman) (Note: Mistaken for two black men he had fought with earlier.)	Gordon Persons
Arthur Lee Grimes	Black	23	M	April 23, 1954	Russell	Murder-Robbery	Daniel W. and Mattie Vann Pearce, 64 and 57, white	Gordon Persons
Albert Lee Jones	Black	23	M	April 23, 1954	Russell	Murder-Robbery	Daniel W. and Mattie Vann Pearce, 64 and 57, white	Gordon Persons
Jesse Frank Jackson	Black	23	M	June 4, 1954	Montgomery	Rape	Female, 25, white	Gordon Persons
Melvin Jackson	Black	20	M	September 28, 1956	Russell	Rape-Burglary	Barbara Clark, 20, white	Jim Folsom
Clarence Johnson	Black	56	M	March 22, 1957	Wilcox	Murder	Homer Smith, white (Note: Convicted and served prison time for a previous murder (no details available).)	Jim Folsom
Rhonda Belle Martin	White	50	F	October 11, 1957	Montgomery	Murder	Claude Martin, white (husband) (Note: Serial killer, murdered several other persons.)	Jim Folsom
Jeremiah Reeves	Black	22	M	March 28, 1958	Montgomery	Rape	Mabel Ann Crowder, white (Note: Suspected serial rapist, charged with the rape and attempted rape of five other white women.)	Jim Folsom
Ernest Cornell Walker	Black	25	M	December 4, 1959	Jefferson	Rape-Burglary	Female, 48, white	John M. Patterson
Edwin Ray Dockery	White	25	M	December 11, 1959	Morgan	Murder-Robbery	Willie Thelbert Heatherly, white	John M. Patterson
Columbus Boggs	Black	27	M	April 29, 1960	Dallas	Murder	M. L. Chance, white	John M. Patterson
Joe Henry Johnson	Black	19	M	November 24, 1961	Limestone	Murder-Rape	Dicie Boyd, 61, white	John M. Patterson
Wilmon Gosa	Black	43	M	August 31, 1962	Tuscaloosa	Murder	Sheila Gosa, 5, black (daughter)	John M. Patterson
James Cobern	White	40	M	September 4, 1964	Dallas	Robbery (Note: Also murdered and sexually mutilated the victim.)	Mamie Belle Walker, 45, white (ex-girlfriend)	George Wallace
William Frank Bowen Jr.	White	33	M	January 15, 1965	Madison	Murder-Attempted rape	Janice Lee Thomas, 27, white	George Wallace

== See also ==
- Capital punishment in Alabama
- Crime in Alabama
