= Governor O'Neal =

Governor O'Neal may refer to:

- Edward A. O'Neal (1818–1890), 26th Governor of Alabama
- Emmet O'Neal (1853–1922), 34th Governor of Alabama, son of Edward A. O'Neal.

== See also ==
- Governor O'Neill (disambiguation)
