= Lynda Block =

Lynda Block may refer to:

- Lynda Block (Dream Team), fictional character in the TV series Dream Team
- Lynda Lyon Block (1948–2002), American murderer
