= Governor O'Neill =

Governor O'Neill may refer to:

- Arturo O'Neill (1736–1814), 1st Spanish Governor of West Florida
- C. William O'Neill (1916–1978), 59th Governor of Ohio
- William A. O'Neill (1930–2007), 84th Governor of Connecticut

== See also ==
- Governor O'Neal (disambiguation)
