= 1910 Alabama gubernatorial election =

- November 8, 1910
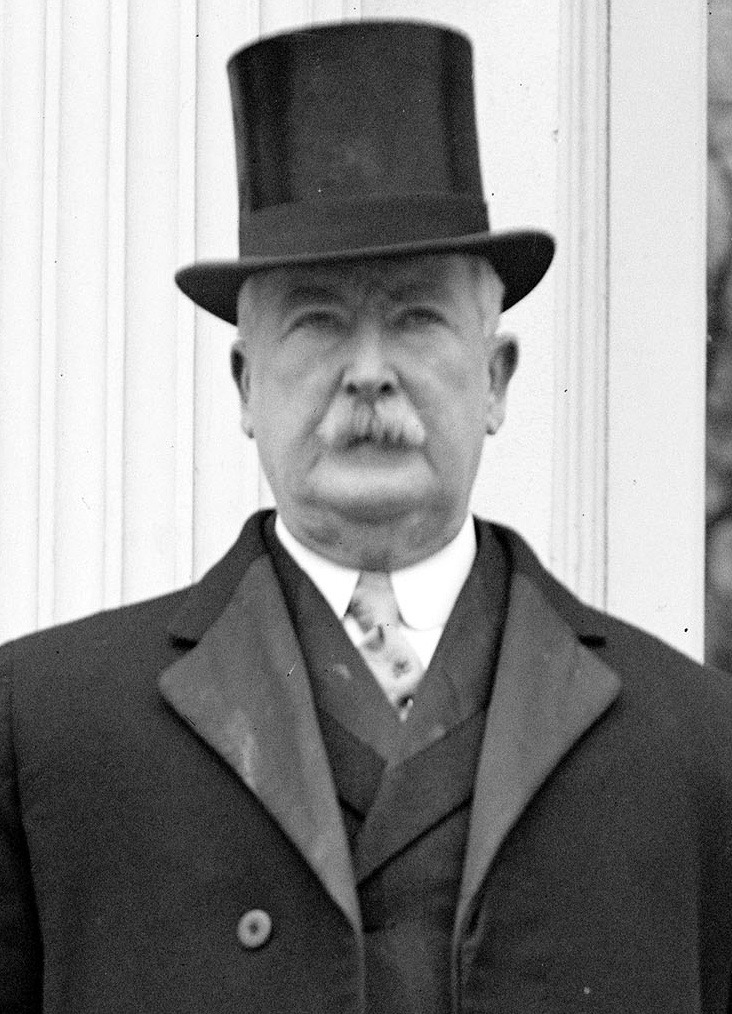

Nominee	Emmet O'Neal	Joseph Oswalt Thompson
Party	Democratic	Republican
Popular vote	77,694	19,210
Percentage	80.18%	19.82%
- County results O'Neal: 50–60% 60–70% 70–80% 80–90% >90% Thompson: 60–70% Unknown/No Vote
Governor before election
B. B. Comer
Democratic
Elected Governor
Emmet O'Neal
Democratic

The 1910 Alabama gubernatorial election took place on November 8, 1910, in order to elect the governor of Alabama. Democratic incumbent B. B. Comer was term-limited, and could not seek a second consecutive term.

== Results ==
1910 Alabama gubernatorial election
Party	Candidate	Votes	%
Democratic	Emmet O'Neal	77,694	80.18
Republican	Joseph Oswalt Thompson	19,210	19.82
Total votes		96,904	100.00
Democratic hold			
