= Joseph Oswalt Thompson =

American politician (1869–1933)

Joseph Oswalt Thompson (February 2, 1869 – 1933) served as Chairman of the Alabama Republican Party and was the Republican Party candidate in the 1910 Alabama gubernatorial election. He was also a congressional candidate in 1918. One of the largest cotton growers in the state, he also held several federal offices. He served as postmaster of Tuskegee, Alabama. and corresponded with Booker T. Washington.

Party political offices
Preceded by Asa E. Stratton	Republican nominee for Governor of Alabama; 1910	Succeeded by John B. Shields
