= Samuel Kirkman =

Samuel Kirkman may refer to

- Samuel Kirkman, Colonel, see Emmet O'Neal
- Sam Kirkman (1889-1956), English footballer for Sheffield Wednesday and Bury, see List of Bury F.C. players (1–24 appearances)
