= Yellow Mama =

Electric chair used for executions in Alabama

Coordinates: 31.134°N 87.449°W

Yellow Mama is the electric chair of the United States state of Alabama. It was used for executions from 1927 to 2002.

First installed at Kilby State Prison near Montgomery, Alabama, the chair acquired its yellow color (and from it, the nickname "Yellow Mama") when it was painted with highway-line paint from the adjacent State Highway Department lab. The chair was built by British inmate Ed Mason in 1927 and was first used to execute Horace DeVaughn in that year. Mason was rewarded for his efforts with a 30-day pass, but he absconded and was later found in a New York state penitentiary.

The last person put to death in Yellow Mama was Lynda Lyon Block, who was executed in 2002. The chair has since been stored in an attic above the execution chamber at the Holman Correctional Facility.

== History ==
=== Background ===
Before 1923, executions in Alabama were the responsibility of the individual counties, which carried them out by hanging in private gallows. In 1923, legislation provided for state-performed executions by electrocution. At Kilby Prison in Montgomery, a special room was designated for this purpose. Inmate Ed Mason, a master carpenter by trade who was serving 60 years for theft and grand larceny, built Yellow Mama. The electric chair remained there until 1970, when it was moved to Holman Prison.

=== Operations ===
The first execution by electrocution in Alabama was performed in the Yellow Mama on April 8, 1927. Between 1930 and 1976, there were 135 executions completed using Yellow Mama. In 1983, the State Senate Judiciary Committee voted in favor of using lethal injections in place of electrocutions. However, the bill failed. In 1997, a bill was discussed which would allow the condemned prisoners to be executed by the option of lethal injection.

=== Problems ===
Alabama has experienced several problematic executions involving the chair. On April 22, 1983, John Louis Evans, the first post-Furman prisoner to be executed by the state, was hit with an initial jolt of electricity, which lasted 30 seconds. Evans's body tensed up, causing the electrode on his left leg to snap off. Soon, smoke and flames were shooting out from under the hood that covered his head. When two physicians entered the death chamber they found him still alive. Ignoring Evans's lawyer's plea, a third jolt of electricity was applied, and he died. The execution took a total of 24 minutes and his body was left charred and smoldering.

In 1989, the state executed Horace Dunkins, who had an IQ of 69 and was convicted of murdering Lynn McCurry. In Dunkins's execution, the first jolt of electricity only knocked him unconscious. Charlie Jones, the warden at the time, said that because the jacks connecting the electricity to the chair had been reversed, there was not enough voltage to kill him on the first try. Therefore, it took 19 minutes for Dunkins to die.

=== Today ===
Yellow Mama is now stored in an attic above the execution chamber at the Holman Correctional Facility in Atmore, Alabama. The last execution to occur using it was that of Lynda Lyon Block on May 10, 2002. On July 1 of that year, a revision to Alabama's death penalty went into effect allowing for an inmate to choose execution by either lethal injection or electrocution. Yellow Mama remains in storage in the event a future death row inmate elects to have the death sentence carried out by electrocution.

State representative Lynn Greer sponsored legislation to return to using the electric chair if lethal injection drugs cannot be obtained. HB18 passed the Alabama House in 2015, but died in the Senate Judiciary committee.

== Notable executions ==
- Lynda Lyon Block (1948–2002) - Murderer; the last to be executed using Yellow Mama
- Horace DeVaughn (1893–1927) - Murderer; the first to be executed using Yellow Mama
- John Louis Evans and Wayne Ritter (1950 and 1954 – 1983 and 1987) - Murderers and spree criminals; the former's execution was botched
- Henry Francis Hays (1954–1997) - One of several perpetrators of the lynching of Michael Donald
- Rhonda Belle Martin (c.1907–1957) - Serial killer and family annihilator
- Jeremiah Reeves (1935–1958) - Executed for rape in a controversial case that attracted civil rights protests.

== See also ==
- Capital punishment in Alabama
- Gruesome Gertie, the nickname given to Louisiana's electric chair
- Old Smokey, the nickname given to New Jersey and Pennsylvania's electric chair
- Old Sparky, the nickname give to several states' electric chairs
- List of people executed by electrocution
