= Syd Jones =

American serial killer

- Born: Syd Jones; Unknown; Alabama, United States (presumed)
- Died: June 25, 1915; Birmingham, Alabama, United States
- Cause of death: Executed by hanging
- Conviction: First degree murder
- Penalty: Death

Details
- Victims: 13
- Span of crimes: 1900s–1914
- Country: United States
- States: Alabama, Nebraska, California, Kentucky, New Mexico, Wyoming

Syd Jones (died June 25, 1915) was a self-confessed American serial killer who admitted to 13 murders in several states, starting from sometime in the 1900s and ending in 1914. He was executed for murdering a fellow convict, while serving a life sentence for another murder.

== Crimes ==
Much of Jones' life, including his date of birth, remains a mystery. It is presumed that he was a native to Alabama, and that at one point he served for the 10th Cavalry Regiment. While stationed in Monterey, California, he shot and killed one of his victims, a deputy sheriff named W. S. Moseley. Jones was given life imprisonment for a murder.

He then proceeded to murder a fellow convict, most likely Cleave Waters, for which he was given the death penalty. On the day of his execution, he left a note in his cell, confessing to 13 murders and naming his victims as follows:

=== Dated murders ===
- 1907 - unnamed convict at Banner mines, Alabama
- 1911 - unnamed convict at Banner mines, Alabama
- May 22, 1911 - Cleave Waters, convict at Banner mines, Alabama

=== Undated murders ===
- Thomas Thompson - Crawford, Nebraska
- Charles Bennett - Crawford, Nebraska
- W. S. Moseley - deputy sheriff at Crawford, Nebraska
- Shay White - Monterey, California
- Thomas Shay - Monterey, California
- Sam Lee - Chinese man at Monterey, California
- Unknown - Unidentified brakeman for Mobile & Ohio Railroad at Bardwell, Kentucky
- Bessie Humphrey - Huntsville, Alabama
- Pattie Quiergo - Mexican woman at Fort Wingate, New Mexico
- John Little John - Native American at Sheridan, Wyoming

Jones also confessed to a failed murder attempt against a man named Richard Moore, putting the date as September 12, 1912. He expressed regret at this failure, as he apparently wanted to even out his kill count.

Syd Jones was one of three convicts hanged on June 25, 1915, in Alabama, the other two being:

- Lon Carter, hanged at Birmingham for murdering his wife
- Tim Sharpe, hanged at Anniston for murdering two policemen

== Corroboration of claims ==
After his execution, authorities from the Crawford Police Department contacted The Alliance Herald in order to clarify the circumstances for the Nebraska murders. While a trio of men was truly killed during a riot in the 10th Cavalry, they also noted that the official's name was not W. S. Moseley, but instead Art Moss. They further explained the events as follows - at the time, the 10th Cavalry had been stationed at Fort Robinson. Some of the troopers held a grudge against the Moss brothers, as they had won a race. A few weeks after winning said race, the Marshal of Crawford was called for some business out of town, and thus selected Art Moss to serve during his absence.

On a Sunday evening, several of the soldiers got drunk near the river embankments, before returning to the town and causing a disturbance. The police were called, with Moss arriving and trying to calm down the situation. At that moment, the soldiers opened fire and killed Moss, immediately fleeing afterwards. A crowd of citizens chased after them, killing one of the fugitives near a reservation and capturing another, who was hiding in a barn loft, before dragging him to the jail. In the meantime, the rest of the soldiers had gotten firearms, with the intention of shooting up the town.

Due to fears of a lynching, a guard was sent down from Fort Robinson to protect the jail, and when the soldiers arrived, they surrounded the residence. While they were on duty, a man named Phil Murphy came running along and turned towards an alley leading to the jail, which was guarded by the troopers. Unaware of their presence, they told him to halt, but Murphy became frightened and instead continued running.

The soldiers, believing he was making a run for the jail, opened fire and killed him. When the following morning came and the situation had calmed down, the captured soldier was tried, found guilty and sent off to a penitentiary. The authorities from the department suggested that Jones was among the crowd of troopers who killed Moss, as a man with that name was found to have connections to the 10th Cavalry.

== See also ==
- List of serial killers in the United States
