= Horace DeVaughn =

First person executed by electric chair in Alabama (died 1927)

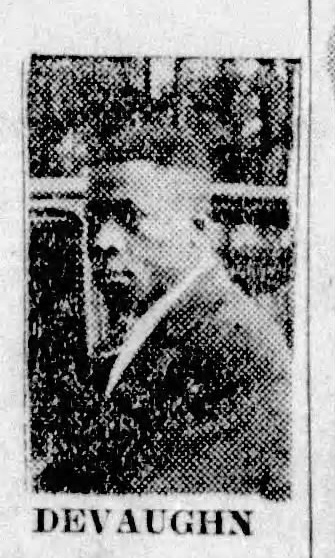
- Born: c. 1893; Alabama, U.S.
- Died: April 8, 1927 (age 34); Kilby Prison, Montgomery County, Alabama, U.S.
- Cause of death: Execution by electrocution
- Known for: First person executed in Alabama's electric chair
- Convictions: Alabama; First degree murder Virginia; Second degree murder
- Penalty: Alabama; Death; Virginia; 10 years imprisonment

Horace DeVaughn (c. 1893 – April 8, 1927) was an American man convicted of double murder, and the first person to be executed by the electric chair in Alabama. DeVaughn was convicted of the double robberies and murders of Auburn B. Moore and Mrs. Ruby Thornton, which he committed fewer than three months prior to his execution. Prior to the double murder, DeVaughn also served time in Virginia for a third murder.

== Background and murder of Ada Gaither ==
Horace DeVaughn was born in Birmingham, Alabama. DeVaughn had brothers named Latham and Owen, sisters named Ollie and Mabel, and a mother named Lucilla; his father, William, was formerly an enslaved man.

As a young adult, Horace DeVaughn moved to Virginia and, while there, went by the name Arthur DeVaughn. In 1920, he was convicted of murdering a black woman named Ada Gaither in Wise County, Virginia, and he was sentenced to 10 years in the Virginia State Penitentiary. Prior to the murder, DeVaughn had boarded with Gaither in her home for ten years. DeVaughn beat Gaither to death with a fire poker and a hatchet's handle in late January 1920, and he confessed to her murder in addition to being tied to the crime with physical evidence, including bloodstained clothes. He claimed to have killed her in self-defense after she threatened him with a knife, although investigators did not find a knife in her room and speculated that his actual motive for killing her was robbery. After his conditional parole from prison in October 1926, DeVaughn moved back to Birmingham to live with his father and found work at the Stockham Pipe and Fittings Company.

At the time of the murders of A.B. Moore and Ruby Thornton, DeVaughn was approximately 34 years old.

== Murders of A.B. Moore and Ruby Thornton ==
On January 19, 1927, Horace DeVaughn borrowed a shotgun from a family friend, black storekeeper D.B. Benion, to hunt rabbits. That evening, on his way home, he encountered 40-year-old A.B. Moore, a Chattanooga, Tennessee-based married father of several children and the Southern Railroad Superintendent of Safety and Sanitation, parked in a car alongside 35-year-old Ruby Thornton, the wife of J.C. Thornton and mother of a ten-year-old daughter. DeVaughn approached the car, and Moore exited the car; DeVaughn then shot Moore in the face with the shotgun, after which Ruby Thornton exited the car and fled. DeVaughn followed her in pursuit, caught up to her, and shot her in the back of the head with the shotgun. DeVaughn returned to Moore's body and robbed him of $22, a watch, and a chain. Both Moore and Thornton died from their wounds; Moore was decapitated from the shotgun blast. A passerby discovered their bodies the next day.

After the murders, DeVaughn went to Zion City, a black settlement, due to his apprehension about returning home; on his way there, he discarded a pocketbook containing "cards" belonging to Moore. The next day, he went to work, where he discarded Moore's watch in a toilet.

=== Investigation, confession, and trial ===
Police obtained the murder weapon on January 30, 1927, and discovered that the shotgun used in the murders made a "peculiar impression" on the caps of shells due to a broken plunger. They then arrested D.B. Benion, who they knew to be the owner of the faulty gun. On January 31, 1927, police rigorously interrogated both of DeVaughn's aged parents, two of his brothers, one of his sisters, and two additional black citizens who were affiliated with the family, including Benion. At 5:30 pm, after a full day of questioning, DeVaughn confessed to committing the murder alone, thereby exonerating his family and the additional associates. A court stenographer recorded his written confession in front of several members of his family and a group of newspaper reporters. In his confession, DeVaughn accused Moore of shouting profanity at him and approaching him before the shooting occurred, and he "stoutly maintained" that he never robbed or made contact with Thornton before or after shooting her. Following his confession, officials held him in the Jefferson County jail pending trial.

The Associated Press reported that DeVaughn's trial was "the speediest" in Jefferson County court history. Four hours and 35 minutes elapsed between the first witness's testimony and the jury's retiring to deliberate the verdict. During his trial, prosecutors subpoenaed his brother Latham to testify against him, but Latham did not show up; officials subsequently put out an "attachment order" mandating his appearance. Other than Latham, there were 22 witnesses for the prosecution and none for the defense. Horace DeVaughn was found guilty of first degree murder without recommendation of mercy, and he was sentenced to death in the electric chair, becoming the first person in Alabama's history to be condemned to die by that method.

== Execution ==
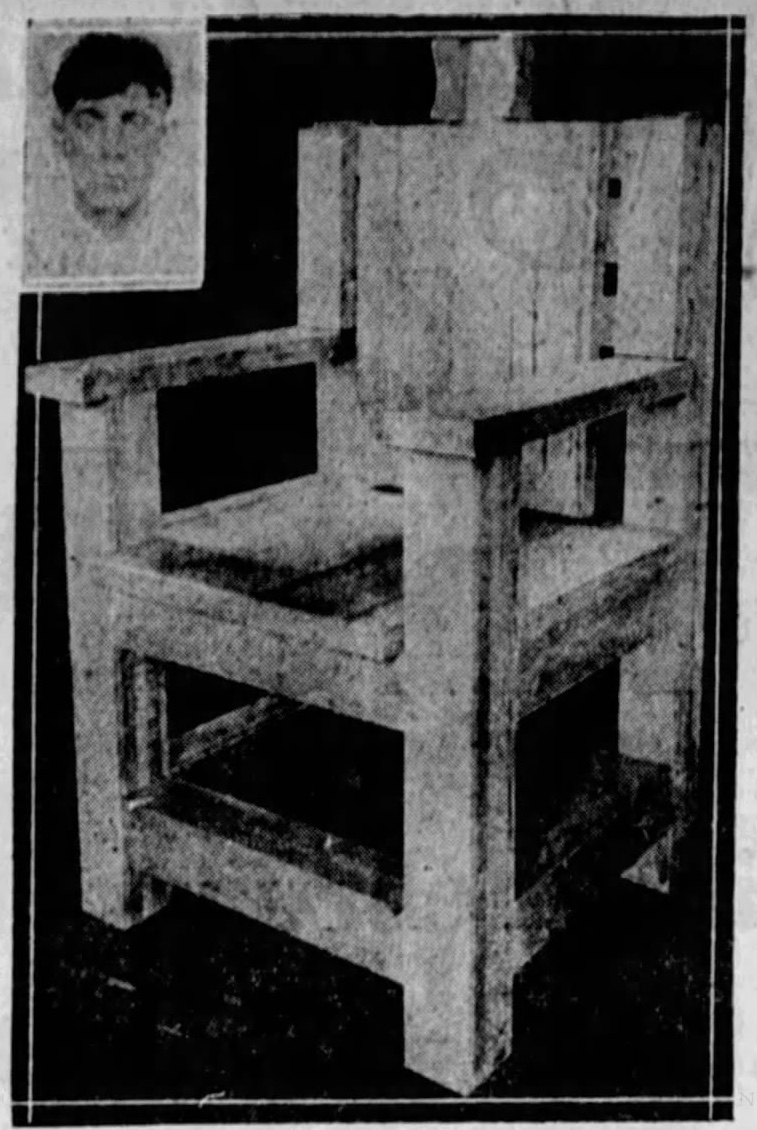
Alabama's electric chair, pictured in 1927 (with an insert [top left] of Edward "Ed" Mason, the carpenter who constructed it)

The law replacing hanging with electrocution in Alabama went into effect just weeks before DeVaughn's death. DeVaughn was put to death at Kilby Prison in the electric chair and was also the first person to be executed at Kilby Prison. While the chair would later be painted yellow with highway paint and nicknamed "Yellow Mama", the chair was actually painted white at the time of DeVaughn's execution. One of A.B. Moore's brothers, George Moore, traveled from Coffeyville, Kansas, to serve as a witness to DeVaughn's execution, with DeVaughn's permission.

DeVaughn entered the execution chamber singing hymns with three spiritual advisors who had administered last rites minutes prior. After entering the execution chamber but before sitting in the chair, he and the ministers prayed. When a warden asked him if he had a final statement, one news report said he replied, "No, sir, I don't believe I have," while another said he replied, "I don't think there is any more I can say. I have made my confession. I have made myself right with the Lord, and I am ready to go." DeVaughn's final request as he was strapped into the chair was for one of the ministers attending to him to bid his mother goodbye on his behalf; prior to being led to the chamber, he had written a letter to his mother and sister Ollie bidding them farewell.

DeVaughn underwent three 2,000-volt discharges between 12:30 am and 12:42 am. Prison officials posited that DeVaughn was unconscious after the first application of electricity but justified the additional applications by stating that DeVaughn was "a man of powerful build and physique, and of tremendous physical strength, making his resistance to the lethal current far greater than that of the average person." Witnesses to the execution observed smoke arising from DeVaughn's leg electrodes during the third application of electricity; they also reported seeing sparks and smelling the odor of burning flesh during DeVaughn's execution.

H.C. Norman, the Kilby Prison engineer, resigned from his position prior to DeVaughn's execution. While his resignation was effective May 1, almost a month after the execution, he did not participate in the preparation or events surrounding DeVaughn's execution at all, and stated that he was resigning due to his opposition to being present at condemned inmates' electrocutions.

Before the execution, his family did not make a request for his body; reporters posited that the University of Alabama's medical department would therefore take possession of his body afterwards.

== See also ==
- List of people executed in the United States in 1927
