= Rhonda Belle Martin =

American serial killer

- Born: Rhonda Belle Thomley; November 4, 1906; Alabama, U.S.
- Died: October 11, 1957 (aged 50); Kilby Correctional Facility, Alabama, U.S.
- Resting place: Montgomery Memorial Cemetery
- Occupation: Waitress
- Spouses: W. R. Alderman (m. 1922–1926) George W. Garrett (m. 1928–1939) Talmadge John Gipson (m. 1939–1939) Claude Carroll Martin (m. 1950–1951) Ronald Martin (m. 1951–1957)
- Children: 7
- Status: Executed by electrocution
- Conviction: First degree murder
- Penalty: Death

Details
- Victims: 6
- Span of crimes: 1937–1951
- Country: United States
- State: Alabama

Rhonda Belle Martin (née Thomley; November 4, 1906 – October 11, 1957) was an American serial killer who was executed by the state of Alabama for the murder of Claude Carroll Martin, her fourth husband, in 1951. Martin's method of murder was rat poison; she was also accused of poisoning and murdering her own mother, as well as five of her seven children, all of whom were below the age of 12 at their deaths. Only one of her victims, her former stepson and fifth husband, Ronald Martin, was known to have survived. Although she initially confessed to all the murders she was accused of committing, she later recanted her confession in the murders of two of her children.

Martin's execution made her the third and final woman to be electrocuted in Alabama before the Furman v. Georgia ruling, as well as the last woman put to death in the state until 2002, when Lynda Lyon Block was executed.

== Life before murders ==
Rhonda Belle Thomley was born in 1906 in Alabama. Before her arrest, she worked as a waitress. At the time of her arrest, she lived in Montgomery, Alabama.

== Murders and apprehension ==
She confessed in March 1956 to poisoning her mother, two husbands, and three of her children. She denied killing two other children. According to a LIFE Magazine article published at the time, she loved getting the get-well cards, and later the sympathy cards, that came when the victims died. She took great care to have them buried side by side in a private plot.

Her fifth husband, Ronald Martin (formerly her stepson, as he was the son of Claude Carroll Martin), was poisoned like the others. However, he survived and was left a paraplegic. It was his illness that led authorities to look into the strange deaths surrounding Martin.

Prosecutors said collecting insurance proceeds prompted her killing spree, although this is unlikely since she collected only enough to cover burial costs, and she never admitted this was the case.

Martin was arrested in March 1956.

== Trial ==
Martin was convicted of murdering fifty-one-year-old Claude Carroll Martin in 1951 by surreptitiously feeding him rat poison. Although Martin was only convicted of one murder, she admitted to committing every murder she was suspected of, except for two of the children.

== Death row and execution ==
Because Martin had a heart condition, prison officials usually withheld information from her regarding her scheduled execution dates until the dates were very near. The day before her execution, Martin had a clemency hearing that lasted for two hours, during which her defense attorney unsuccessfully attempted to stop the execution because Martin's sanity had not been adequately tested.

Martin was housed in the Jefferson County jail until late May 1957; as her execution was set for May 31, she was transferred to Kilby Prison, where Alabama's electric chair was located. When that execution date was postponed, she was sent to the Julia Tutwiler Prison for Women. Eight days before her execution, Martin gave an interview in which she said, "Well, you've never seen anybody ready to sit down in the electric chair. But if that's what it's got to be, that's what it will be." She was housed at the Julia Tutweiler Prison until approximately four hours before her execution, when she was sent back to Kilby Prison. Seven hours before her execution, Martin had a last meal consisting of a hamburger, mashed potatoes, cinnamon rolls, and coffee.

=== Execution ===
On October 11, 1957, Martin was led to Alabama's electric chair while she held a Bible in her hand. Martin was reportedly calm but quietly weeping at her execution as she recited the 23rd Psalm alongside the prison chaplain. She received the first shock at 12:10 am, and she was pronounced dead at 12:16 am and removed from the death chamber at 12:25 am. She declined to make a final statement.

Martin's execution featured a slight mishap before the time she received the first shock, as her executioners threw the switch activating the electricity before the electrodes were ready for use. Martin had to wait several minutes until the electric cycle was finished before the authorities could complete her execution.

In 1956, Martin had expressed a desire for her body to be sent to an unspecified "scientific institution" for autopsy, so scientists could analyze her and find out why she committed her crimes. After her execution, prison officials found a note expressing a similar sentiment. Martin's note read, in part, that she wanted physicians "to find out why I committed the crimes I committed. I can't understand it, for I had no reason whatsoever. There's definitely something wrong." Instead, after her execution, some family members received her body in a funeral home in Montgomery.

Martin was the last woman executed in Alabama until 2002, when Lynda Lyon Block was executed for the murder of a policeman.

== See also ==
- List of serial killers in the United States
- List of people executed in Alabama
- List of people executed in the United States in 1957

== Resources ==
- "Mother Tells 6 Killings by Poison," The Associated Press, March 14, 1956.
- "Jury Sentences Woman To Death," United Press International, June 5, 1956.
- "Rhonda Bell Martin," Mind of a Killer (DVD), Kozel Multimedia [1998].
- Shipman, Marlin (2002). "Murdered Family Members and Other Schemes". The Penalty Is Death: U.S. Newspaper Coverage of Women's Executions. University of Missouri Press. pp. 46–51. ISBN 0-8262-1386-3.
