= Lynda Lyon Block =

American murderer (1948–2002)

- Born: Lynda Cheryle Lyon; February 8, 1948; Orlando, Florida, U.S.
- Died: May 10, 2002 (aged 54); Holman Correctional Facility, Alabama, U.S.
- Status: Executed by electrocution
- Motive: Anti-police sentiment To avoid arrest
- Conviction: Capital murder
- Penalty: Death (December 21, 1994)
- Accomplice: George Sibley

Details
- Victims: 1
- Date: October 4, 1993
- Country: United States
- State: Alabama
- Weapon: 9mm Glock pistol

Lynda Cheryle Lyon Block (February 8, 1948 – May 10, 2002) was an American woman convicted of the murder of Sgt. Roger Lamar Motley Jr.

== Background ==
Lynda Cheryle Lyon was born February 8, 1948, in Orlando, Florida, to Francis Stephen "Frank" Lyon and Berylene Elisabeth Owen. Lynda and her sister Denyce (born 1952) lost their father when she was 10, when he died of heart failure. Lynda and her mother were never close, and Block claimed that her mother was both physically and mentally abusive. Block married an 80-year-old man named Karl Block (a military veteran who had lost his son in a car crash), but they divorced in December 1991.

Her second husband, George Sibley (September 8, 1942 – August 4, 2005), claimed that a constant trait of Block was charity. While living in Key West, she served as Secretary of the Humane Society and also as an animal abuse investigator. In addition to her service to the Humane Society, she was active in civic work; she served as president of the Friends of the Library in Key West for two years and served as publicity director for a mayoral candidate.

Before the crime that led to her conviction and transfer to Alabama's death row, Block published Liberatis, a political magazine.

In August 1992, Lynda Block (who kept Karl's surname) and Sibley broke into Karl's apartment, forced him to a chair, gagged him, and demanded he stop his efforts to claim their house for himself. She stabbed him once in the chest and left him behind. Neighbors found Karl, and the two attackers were charged with aggravated battery on someone older than 65. Block and Sibley pleaded no contest and a sentencing date was scheduled, but they never showed up.

== Crime ==
On October 4, 1993, Block's common-law husband George Sibley and Block's nine-year-old son were in a parked car in the parking lot of a Walmart store in Opelika, Alabama. A passer-by expressed concern for Block's son to Opelika Police Sergeant Roger Motley, saying it appeared to her as if the boy wanted help. She also believed the family could be living in the vehicle. At that time, Sibley and Block were on the run from the law in Florida after failing to appear for sentencing on an assault charge against Block's ex-husband Karl. Motley found Sibley's car, parked behind and approached it, and asked for Sibley's license.

By Sibley's own account, he was explaining to Motley his personal theory that he was not required to have one, when he observed Motley placing his hand on his gun. Sibley then drew his gun and began shooting at Motley, who returned fire, wounding Sibley. Motley took cover behind his patrol car; witnesses stated Sibley fired first. Block was at a payphone when she heard the gunfire. She drew her gun and witnesses stated that she was in a crouched position when she fired. Block claimed that she fired just as she stopped running toward Motley. As Motley turned to face Block, she fired again, hitting him in the chest. Motley, who had given his bulletproof vest to another officer, was mortally wounded.

Part of an anti-government movement, Block and Sibley had renounced their citizenship and destroyed their birth certificates, driver's licenses, and Social Security cards. They refused to cooperate with their court-appointed attorneys, maintaining that they had acted in self-defense. They also maintained that Alabama did not have the authority to try them as it was not properly re-admitted into the Union after the American Civil War. Although it could not be determined who fired the fatal shot, they were both convicted of capital murder and sentenced to death.

== Death row ==
Block, Alabama Institutional Serial #Z575, entered death row on December 21, 1994. While on death row, she was held at the Julia Tutwiler Prison for Women in Wetumpka, Alabama.

== Execution ==
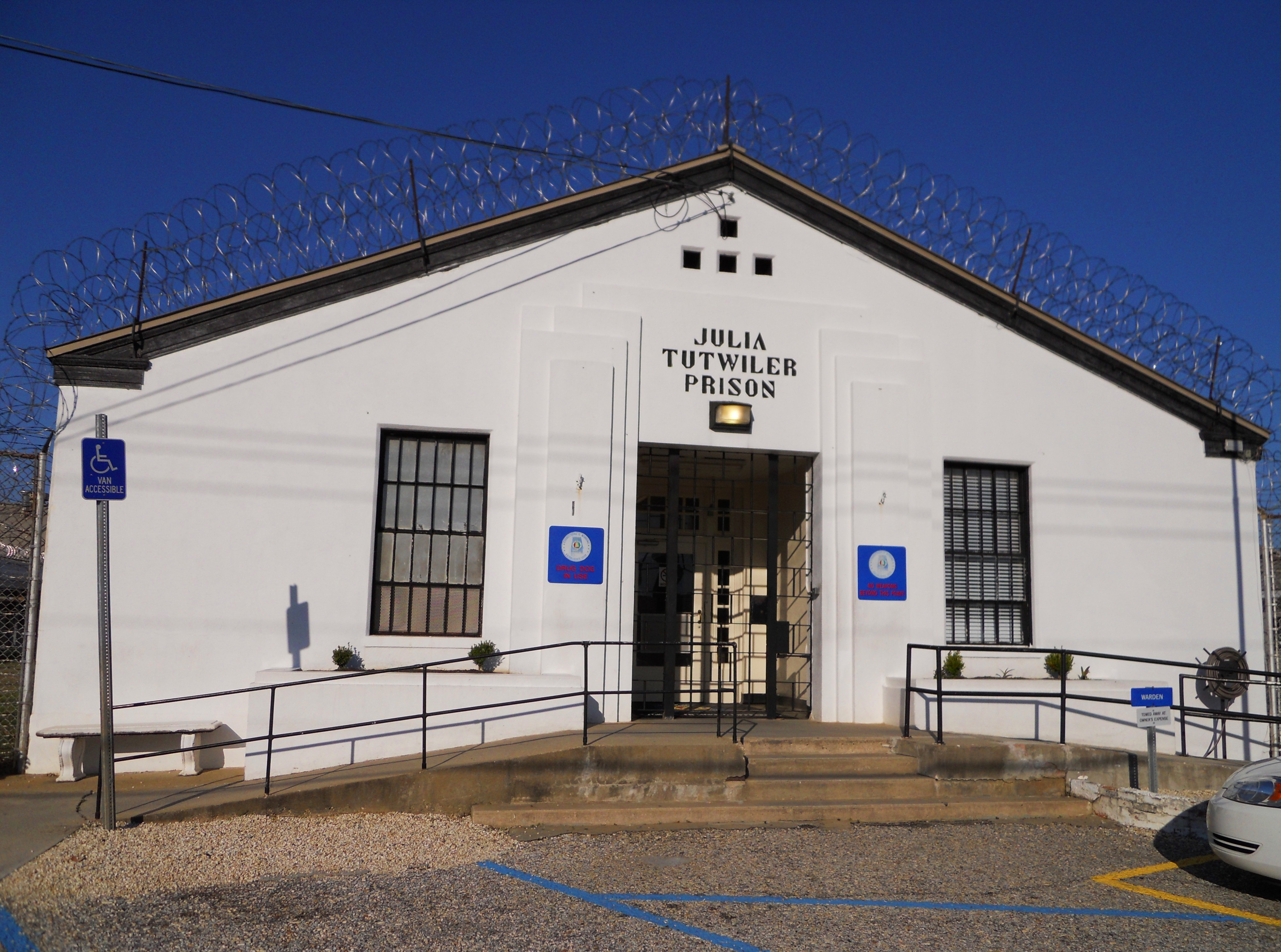
Block was held at the death row of the Julia Tutwiler Prison for Women

Block was executed on May 10, 2002. Her execution occurred at the Holman Correctional Facility near Atmore, Alabama.

Before the execution, three friends visited Block for several hours. Block also saw a spiritual adviser. She had not requested a last meal, nor did she make a final statement. At approximately 12:00 midnight, she was placed in the electric chair and at 12:01 a.m., the current was turned on. At 12:10 a.m., she was pronounced dead. She was the first woman executed in the state since Rhonda Belle Martin in 1957, the last woman in the United States to be executed by a method other than lethal injection, and the last person in the United States to be executed by electric chair without the choice of an alternative method.

Sibley filed a hand-written petition asking the Alabama Supreme Court to block his execution, claiming that Block had fired the shot that killed Motley. He was executed on August 4, 2005, by lethal injection.

== See also ==
- Capital punishment in Alabama
- Capital punishment in the United States
- List of people executed in Alabama
- List of people executed in the United States in 2002
- List of women executed in the United States since 1976
- List of people executed by electrocution

Executions carried out in Alabama
Preceded by Pernell La'sha Ford June 2, 2000	Lynda Lyon Block; May 10, 2002	Succeeded by Anthony Johnson December 12, 2002
Executions carried out in the United States
Preceded by Reginald Reeves – Texas May 9, 2002	Lynda Lyon Block – Alabama; May 10, 2002	Succeeded by Leslie Dale Martin – Louisiana May 10, 2002
Women executed in the United States
Preceded by Lois Nadean Smith – Oklahoma December 4, 2001	Lynda Lyon Block – Alabama; May 10, 2002	Succeeded by Aileen Wuornos – Florida October 9, 2002
