= Emmet O'Neal =

American politician (1853–1922)

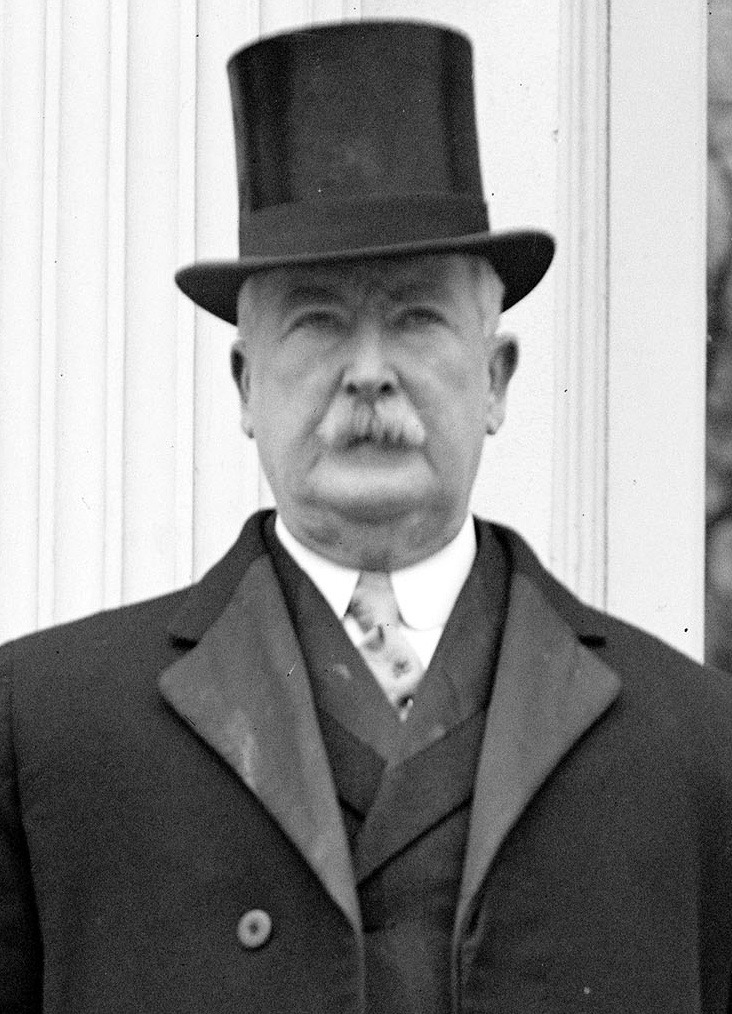
- O'Neal in 1913

34th Governor of Alabama
- In office January 17, 1911 – January 18, 1915
- Lieutenant: Walter D. Seed Sr.
- Preceded by: B. B. Comer
- Succeeded by: Charles Henderson

United States Attorney for the Northern District of Alabama
- In office 1893–1897
- President: Grover Cleveland
- Preceded by: Lewis E. Parsons Jr.
- Succeeded by: William Vaughn

Personal details
- Born: September 23, 1853 Florence, Alabama, US
- Died: September 7, 1922 (aged 68) Birmingham, Alabama, US
- Resting place: Florence Cemetery, Florence, Alabama
- Party: Democratic
- Parent: Edward A. O'Neal (father)
- Education: University of Mississippi; University of Alabama
- Occupation: Lawyer; politician

Emmet O'Neal (September 23, 1853 – September 7, 1922) was an American Democratic politician and lawyer who was the 34th governor of Alabama from 1911 to 1915. He was a reformer in the progressive mold and is best known for securing the commission form of government for the cities of Alabama.

According to one study, O’Neal was amongst a number of progressives in Alabama that personified "a whites-only economic liberalism".

== Career ==
O'Neal was born on September 23, 1853, in Florence, Alabama to Edward A. O'Neal and Olivia Moore O'Neal. His father, Edward A. O'Neal, was a lawyer who became a Confederate States Army officer during the American Civil War. A member of the Democratic Party, he was elected as Governor of Alabama, serving from 1882 to 1886 in the post-Reconstruction era. Emmet O'Neal received his early schooling in Florence and was a student at the University of Mississippi in 1870 and 1871. He received the degree of A.B. from the University of Alabama in 1873.

Reading law under the supervision of his father, he was admitted to the bar in Florence in 1876. In 1901 and 1910, he was elected and served as president of the Alabama Bar Association. In 1911 he was made a member of the governing board of the American Bar Association.

== State politics ==
O'Neal served as a presidential elector in Alabama's 8th congressional district in 1888 and was an elector at large from Alabama in 1892 and 1908. He was appointed as United States District Attorney for the Northern District of Alabama and served in that capacity from 1893 to 1897. In 1901, he served as a member at large in the Constitutional Convention of 1901, where he was a member of the committees on rules and regulations and suffrage; and chair of the committee on local legislation. He played a prominent role in framing the suffrage provisions, adding a poll tax, literacy test (administered subjectively by white officials), and property ownership requirements. These constitutional changes resulted in a "precipitous" decline in voter registration, dramatically suppressing election turnout for both Black and poor white voters. Most blacks were effectively disenfranchised until after passage of federal civil rights legislation in the mid-1960s, including the Voting Rights Act of 1965.

In the runup to the 1908 presidential election, O'Neal made an extensive speaking tour in the West campaigning for William Jennings Bryan. In 1909, he campaigned against the addition of a prohibition amendment to the Constitution of Alabama.

== Governor 1911–1915 ==
O'Neal was elected governor in 1910, began his term of service in January 1911, and served four years. Among the more important achievements of his administration was the improvement of the convict system, the impetus given to good roads, and the creation of the State Highway Commission. Enforcement of the law was achieved by calling special court terms to handle backlogs. Special counsels were appointed in both civil and criminal cases where the interests of the public and the State were concerned. Legislation was passed to establish the commission form of city government in those jurisdictions that qualified. He also worked to improve the judiciary. He actively urged a new constitutional convention, and his legal writings were published and read.

He was an active member of the Governors' conference and participated in all the debates during his term. At the Governors' conference meeting in Richmond, Virginia, he delivered an address on the importance of establishing a system for rural credit (including the availability of cooperative credit unions, cooperative land banks, and similar organizations). His work as a pioneer in that movement resulted in the Congressional passage of legislation with a Presidential signature. O'Neal was chair of the Alabama delegation at the 1912 Democratic National Convention, which nominated Woodrow Wilson for president; he was the first Southerner to be elected to the presidency since the war. At the time of the conference of Governors, Governor O'Neal served as a member of that body's executive committee.

Middle-class business and professional activists in the cities were frustrated with the old-fashioned politicized city governments. They demanded a commission form in which experts rather than politicians would very largely run municipal affairs. Governor O'Neal made the commission system his favored reform and secured its passage by the legislature in 1911. Birmingham, Montgomery, and Mobile quickly adopted the commission form.

O’Neal was also an advocate of regulating child labor; calling for a rise in the age limit of children working in mills and factories during his time as governor. As O’Neal noted in a 1915 message to the Alabama legislature:

Alabama occupies the unenviable position of being one of the three states in the Union that permits the life, the health, the intelligence of little children to be coined into money to swell the dividends of mill owners and stockholders. All over the Union the demands for social justice for the toilers in mines, in mills and factories, better hygienic and sanitary protection and safe guards, and for reasonable hours of labor have found a responsive echo in the hearts of the people.

== Other activities ==
He was a member of the Knights of Pythias, the Elks, the Presbyterian church, and the Phi Beta Kappa society. In 1915, Governor O'Neal was appointed referee in bankruptcy, with offices in the Federal building in Birmingham. After his term as governor, he also worked in manufacturing in Birmingham, serving as secretary and treasurer of the Southern Steel Works Company. Governor O'Neal frequently contributed to The North American Review and other publications. He also served as a vice-president of the American Bar Association.

He spoke at the 1919 National Conference on Lynching.

On July 21, 1891, Governor O'Neal married Elizabeth Kirkman, the daughter of Colonel Samuel Kirkman and his wife. They had three children.

Party political offices
Preceded by B. B. Comer	Democratic nominee for Governor of Alabama; 1910	Succeeded by Charles Henderson
Political offices
Preceded by B. B. Comer	Governor of Alabama; 1911–1915	Succeeded by Charles Henderson
