= 1865 Alabama gubernatorial election =

- November 6, 1865
- Turnout: 4.73%
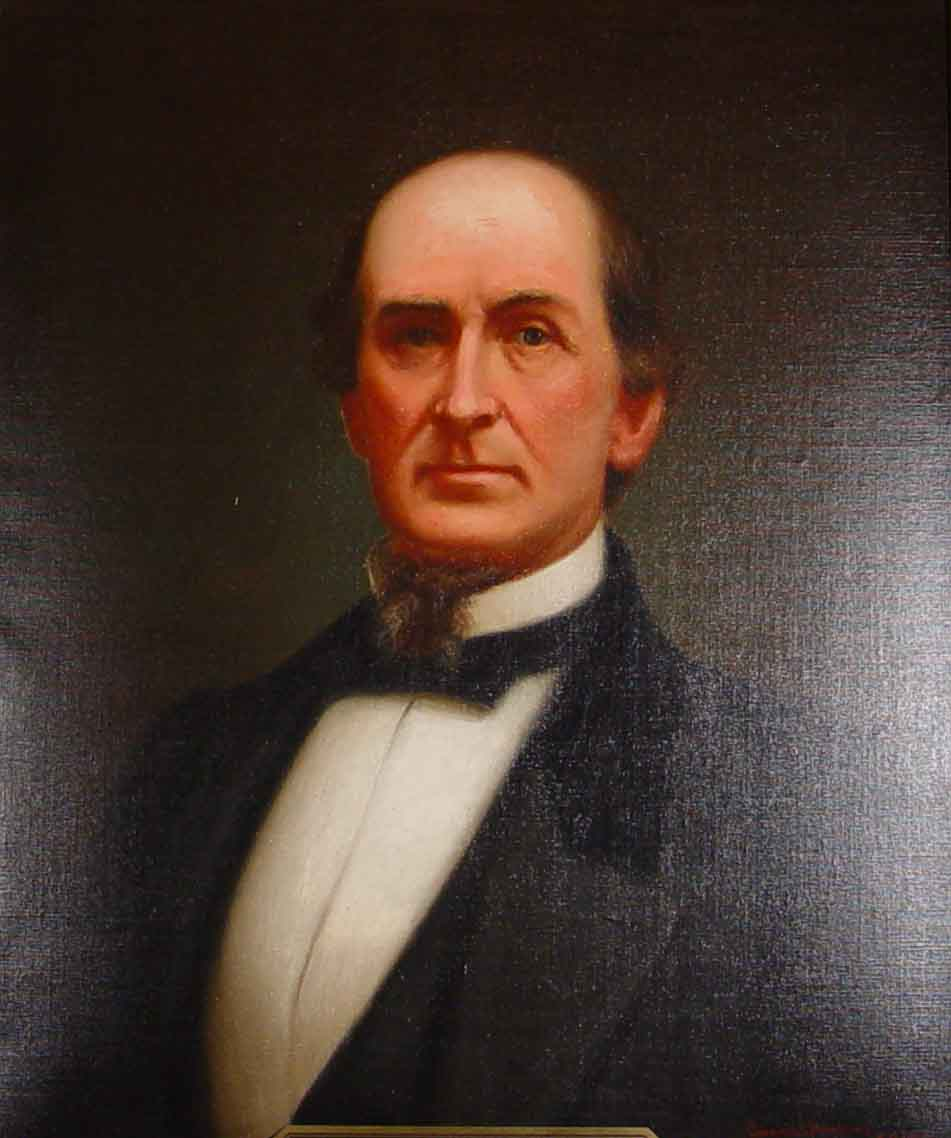

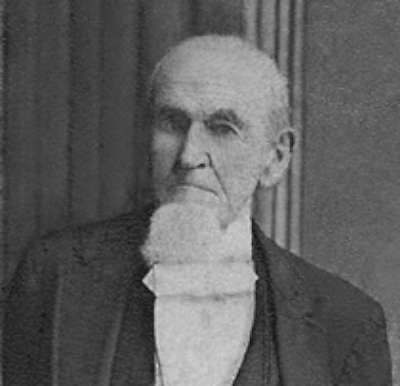

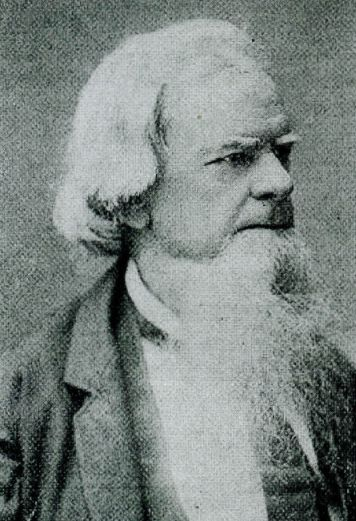
Nominee	Robert M. Patton	Michael J. Bulger	William Russell Smith
Party	Whig	Democratic	Union
Popular vote	20,611	16,380	8,557
Percentage	45.21%	35.93%	18.77%
- County results Patton: 40–50% 50–60% 60–70% 70–80% 80–90% >90% Bulger: 50–60% 60–70% 70–80% 80–90% Smith: 40–50% 50–60% 60–70% 70–80% 80–90%
Governor before election
Lewis E. Parsons
Independent
Elected Governor
Robert M. Patton
Whig

The 1865 Alabama gubernatorial election took place on November 6, 1865, in order to elect the governor of Alabama. Whig Robert M. Patton won with a narrow plurality of the votes, beating Democrat Michael J. Bulger by about 4,000 votes.

This was the last time a Whig won any election in US history.

== Election ==
1865 Alabama gubernatorial election
Party	Candidate	Votes	%
Whig	Robert M. Patton	20,611	45.21
Democratic	Michael J. Bulger	16,380	35.93
Union	William Russell Smith	8,557	18.77
Total votes		62,067	100.00
Whig gain from Independent			
