= Governor Patton =

Governor Patton may refer to:

- John M. Patton (1797–1858), Acting Governor of Virginia
- Paul E. Patton (born 1937), 59th Governor of Kentucky
- Robert M. Patton (1809–1885), 20th Governor of Alabama
