= Sydenham Moore =

American politician (1817–1862)

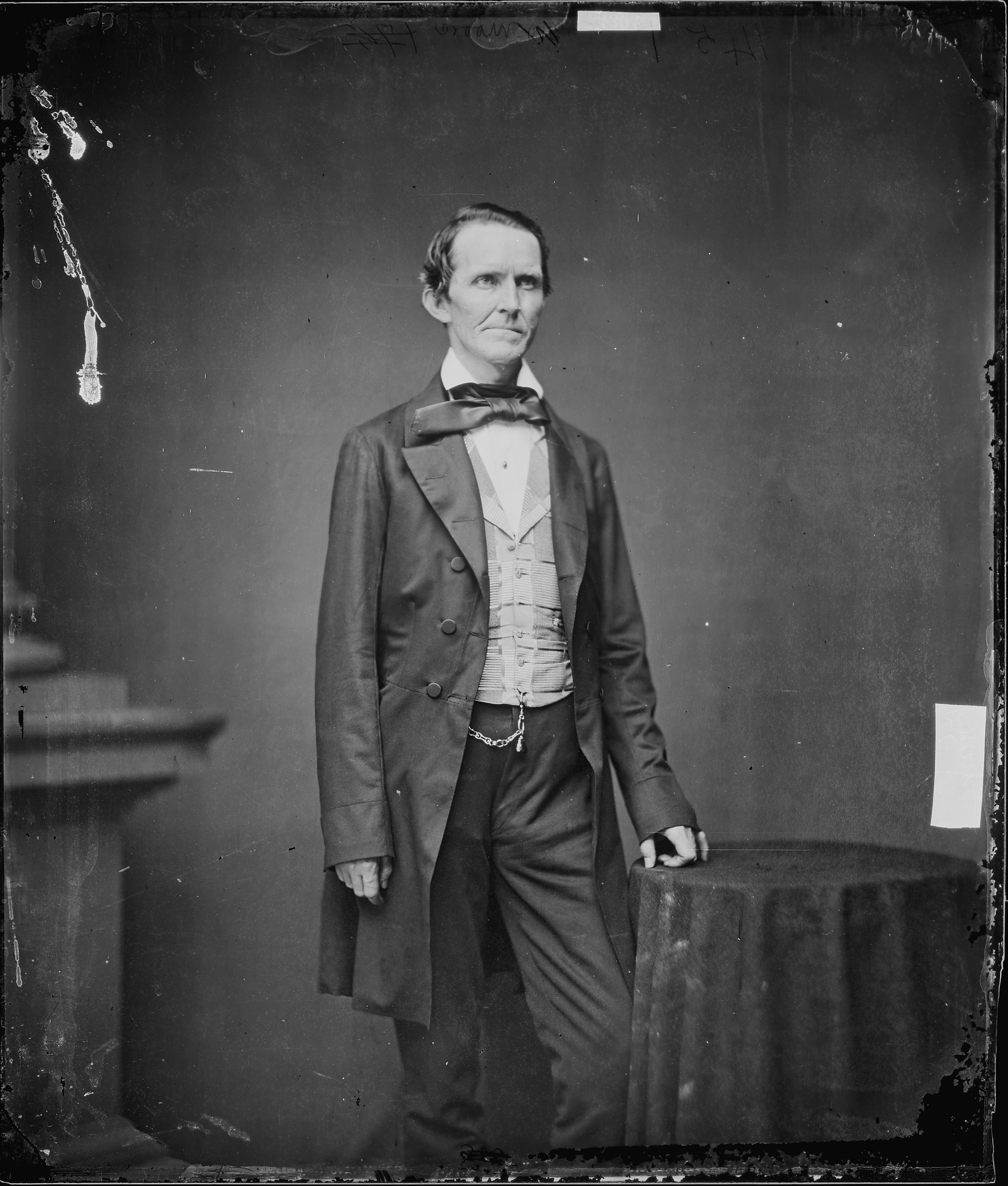
- 1860s portrait of Moore, by Mathew Brady

Member of the U.S. House of Representatives from Alabama's 4th district
- In office March 4, 1857 – January 21, 1861
- Preceded by: William R. Smith
- Succeeded by: District inactive

Personal details
- Born: May 25, 1817 Rutherford County, Tennessee, US
- Died: August 20, 1862 (aged 45) Richmond, Virginia, US
- Resting place: City Cemetery, Greensboro, Alabama
- Party: Democratic
- Education: University of Alabama at Tuscaloosa

Military service
- Allegiance: United States of America; Confederate States
- Battles/wars: Mexican–American War; American Civil War

Sydenham Moore (May 25, 1817 – August 20, 1862) was an American politician who served as a U.S. representative from Alabama.

== Biography ==
Moore was born on May 25, 1817, in Rutherford County, Tennessee. He studied law at the University of Alabama at Tuscaloosa from 1833 to 1836. He was admitted to the bar and commenced practice in Greensboro, Alabama. He owned slaves. He served as judge of Greene County court 1840-1846 and 1848-1850. He served as judge of the circuit court in 1857. He served in the war with Mexico as captain in Colonel Coffey's regiment of Alabama Infantry from June 1846 to June 1847. Moore was elected brigadier general of Alabama Militia.

A Democrat, Moore to the Thirty-fifth and Thirty-sixth Congresses and served from March 4, 1857, until January 21, 1861, when he withdrew.

During the American Civil War, Moore served as colonel of the 11th Regiment Alabama Infantry in the Confederate States Army. He died on August 20, 1862, aged 45, in Richmond, Virginia, from wounds received in the Battle of Seven Pines, May 31, 1862. He was interred in the City Cemetery, Greensboro, Alabama. Moore's journal and other personal papers remain in Montgomery, Alabama, at the Alabama Department of Archives and History.

== Notes ==
U.S. House of Representatives
Preceded by William R. Smith	Member of the U.S. House of Representatives from Alabama's 4th congressional district 1857-1861	Succeeded by District inactive
