= William Russell Smith =

American politician

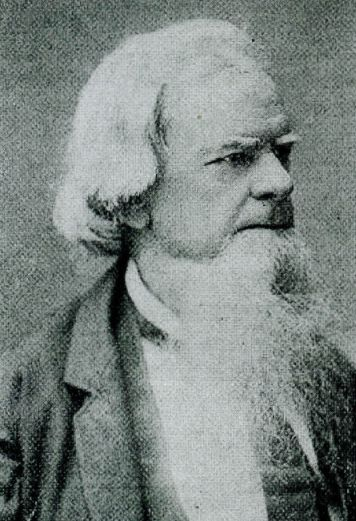

Member of the U.S. House of Representatives from Alabama's 4th district
- In office March 4, 1851 – March 3, 1857
- Preceded by: Samuel Williams Inge
- Succeeded by: Sydenham Moore

Member of the Alabama House of Representatives
- In office 1841-1843

Personal details
- Born: March 27, 1815 Logan County, Kentucky, U.S.
- Died: February 26, 1896 (aged 80) Washington, D.C., U.S.
- Resting place: Mount Olivet Cemetery; Washington, D.C., U.S.
- Party: Democratic

Military service
- Allegiance: Confederate States of America
- Branch/service: Confederate States Army
- Years of service: 1861–1862
- Rank: Colonel
- Unit: 26th Alabama Infantry Regiment

William Russell Smith (March 27, 1815 – February 26, 1896) was a prominent Alabama politician who served in both the United States Congress and the Confederate Congress.

== Biography ==
Smith was born in Logan County, Kentucky. He moved to Alabama at an early age and attended the University of Alabama. Smith was admitted to the bar in 1835.

The next year he served as a captain of state troops in the government's campaign against the Creek Indians, intended to remove most of them to Indian Territory west of the Mississippi River. He served as Mayor of Tuscaloosa in 1839 and as a member of the Alabama House of Representatives from 1841 to 1843. He later briefly served as a state judge from 1850 to 1851.

Smith was elected to four terms in the United States House of Representatives, serving from 1851 to 1857, representing the Fourth District.

At the outbreak of the American Civil War, Smith raised the 26th Alabama Infantry Regiment and was elected its colonel. He stepped down to represent Alabama in the First and the Second Confederate Congresses, from 1862 to 1865.

After the war, he resumed his law practice in Tuscaloosa. He served as president of the University of Alabama from 1869 to 1871.

He died in Washington, D.C., on February 26, 1896. He was interred at Mount Olivet Cemetery in Washington, D.C.

Party political offices
First	Union nominee for Governor of Alabama; 1865	Succeeded by None
U.S. House of Representatives
Preceded by Samuel Williams Inge	Member of the U.S. House of Representatives from Alabama's 4th congressional district 1851–1857	Succeeded by Sydenham Moore
