= Robert M. Patton =

American politician

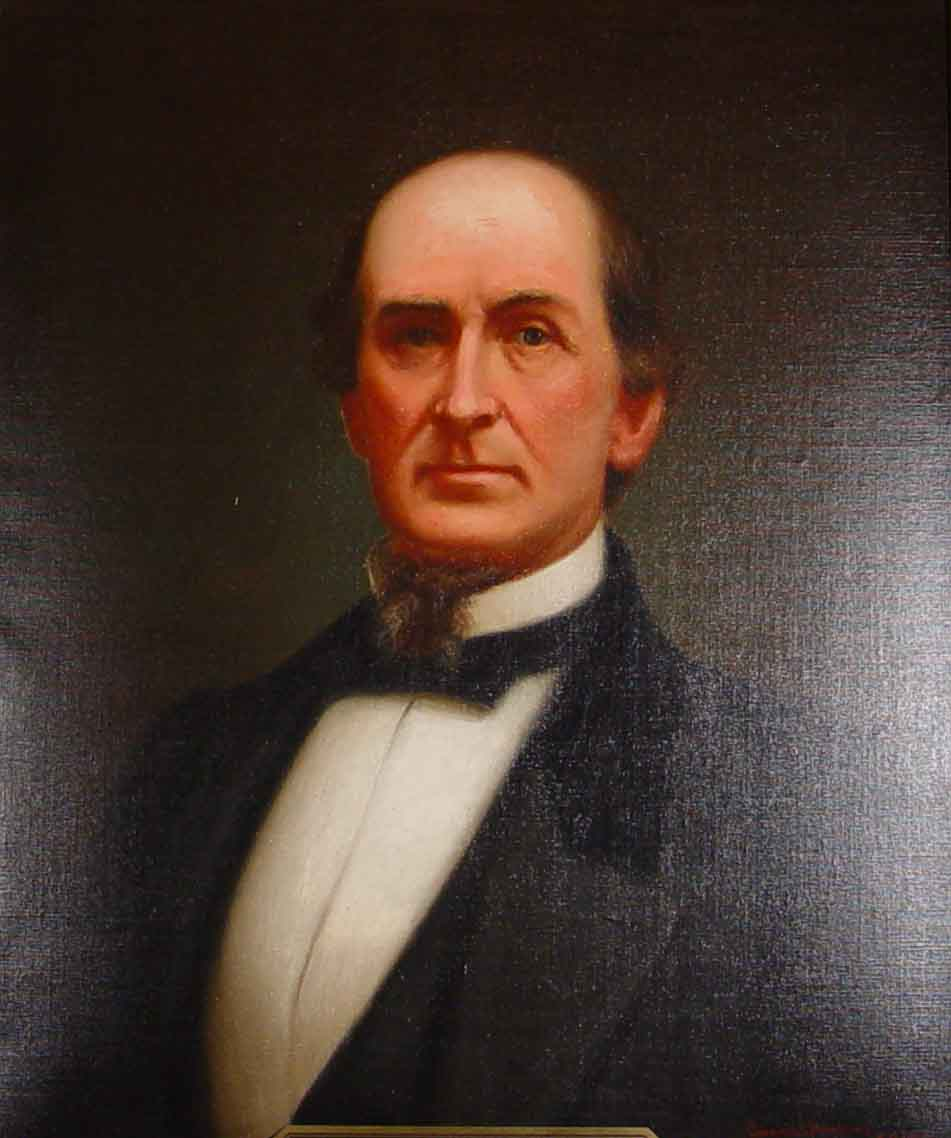

20th Governor of Alabama
- In office December 13, 1865 – July 24, 1868
- Preceded by: Lewis E. Parsons
- Succeeded by: William Hugh Smith

Personal details
- Born: Robert Miller Patton; July 10, 1809 Russell County, Virginia, US
- Died: February 28, 1885 (aged 75) Florence, Alabama, US
- Resting place: Maple Hill Cemetery
- Party: Whig

Robert Miller Patton (July 10, 1809 – February 28, 1885) was an American politician who served as the 20th governor of Alabama from 1865 to 1868. He is the last Whig to be elected to office in the United States.

== Biography ==
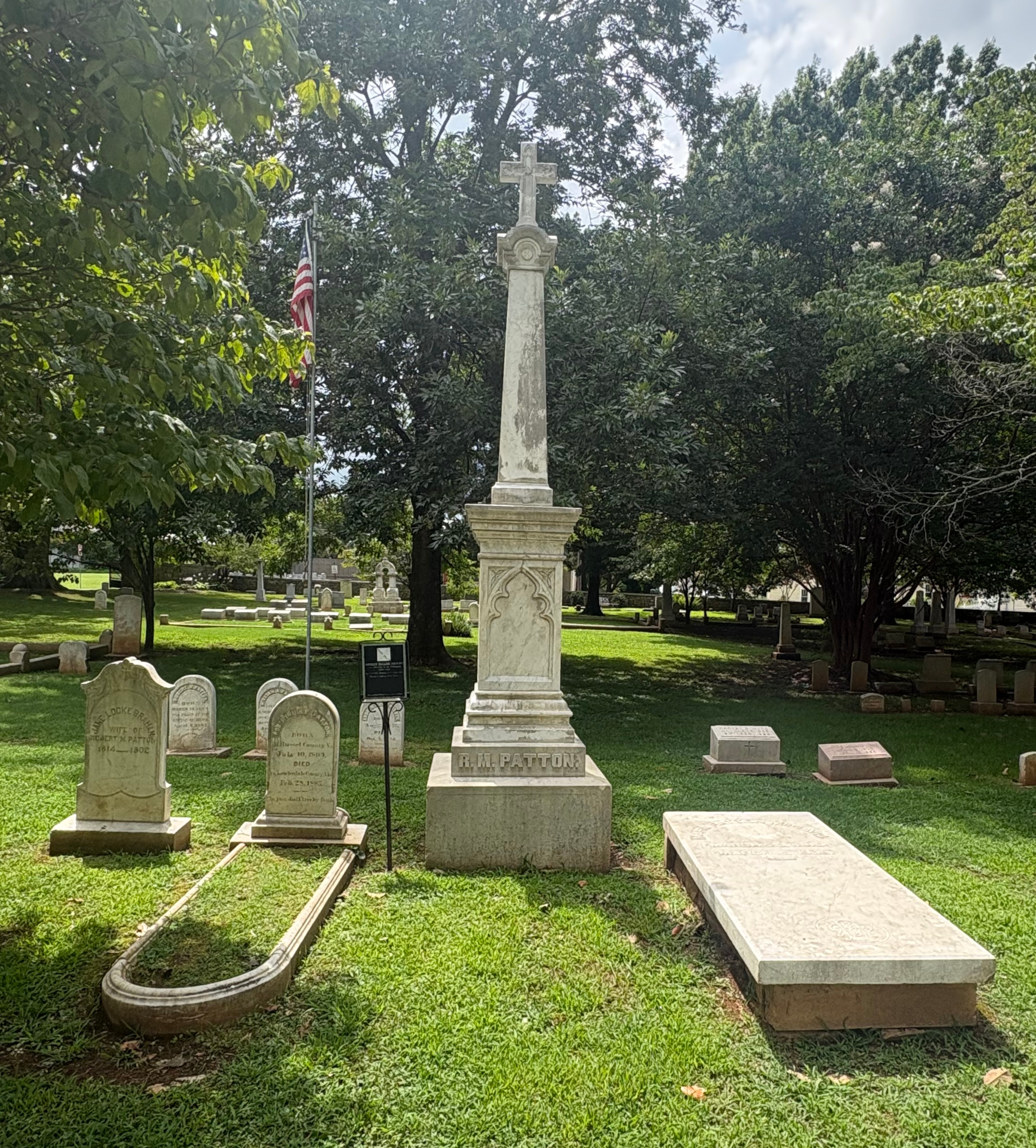
Patton's grave at Maple Hill Cemetery

He was born July 10, 1809, in Russell County, Virginia. His father, William Patton, a Presbyterian of Ulster Scots people, had been born near Derry in the northern part of Ireland and emigrated to the United States in 1791; his mother, Martha Lee (née Hays) Patton, was born in Louisa County, Virginia. In 1818 the family moved to Huntsville, Alabama in the Tennessee Valley. Patton attended Green Academy "for a few years" before beginning his professional education in the cotton business. In 1829 he moved to Florence, Alabama. He quickly established himself as a prominent merchant and cotton planter, owning 4,000 acres of land and enslaving 300 people. He married Jane Locke Braham in 1832. Their marriage produced nine children, of whom seven survived to adulthood.

Around his marriage, Patton began a political career that would continue until interrupted by the American Civil War. In 1832 he was elected to the Alabama Legislature as a Whig. He was elected a second time in 1837, serving as a member of the "special legislature" summoned to organize the state's response to the Panic of 1837. He was later elected president of the Alabama Senate on two occasions before the creation of the office of lieutenant governor.

Never strong in Alabama, the Whig Party declined nationally after 1854. While some southern ex-Whigs sought to continue the party under a new name, Patton and others, including notably U.S. Representative Alexander Stephens of Georgia, went into the Democratic Party. He was a delegate to the disastrous 1860 Democratic National Convention in Charleston, South Carolina that precipitated the party's defeat in the national election. After the convention failed to produce a candidate acceptable to all elements of the party, the Southern Fire-Eaters held a convention at which Vice President John C. Breckinridge of Kentucky was nominated on a pro-slavery platform. While Patton supported the national candidacy of Stephen A. Douglas, Alabama and ten other of the fifteen slave states voted for Breckinridge. The national election was a victory for Abraham Lincoln and the Republicans. Over the winter, Patton was elected as a convention member to consider Alabama's declared secession from the United States. While he initially spoke against secession, Patton financially supported the state's war effort and served as a commissioner in the Confederate government. Two of his sons died fighting in the Confederate Army, and his plantation house was damaged by U.S. soldiers.

After the war, Patton became a delegate to the state constitutional convention summoned under Presidential Reconstruction. The resulting constitution adopted the "white basis" for representation, reducing the influence of the plantation counties, and did not enfranchise freedmen. Patton was elected governor by the eligible white voters of the state, succeeding the provisional military governor appointed following the Confederate surrender. As a former Whig and a resident of northern Alabama, Patton reflected the ideal of the "upcountry Unionist" who President Andrew Johnson looked to rebuild the South.

As governor, Patton cooperated with Freedmen's Bureau agents to provide emergency aid to freedmen and poor whites affected by the war. Otherwise, his administration opposed extending civil or political rights to freedmen, including voting rights. While he vetoed legislation that would have strictly limited the ability of Blacks to move freely throughout the state, he signed into law the convict-leasing system that allowed freed people to be ordered into servitude as punishment for a crime. His primary focus as governor was on rebuilding Alabama's war-torn economy. He supported debt relief to slow the rate of foreclosures. He advocated repealing the federal cotton tax, financial support for public schools, and creating the Alabama Insane Hospital at Tuscaloosa. Heightened concern for the freedmen's plight in Congress led to the passage of the federal Reconstruction Acts and the creation of the Third Military District comprising Alabama, Florida, and Georgia. Most of Patton's constitutional authority passed to Major General John Pope, while Major General Wager Swayne remained as commissioner of the Freedmen's Bureau in Alabama. Patton nonetheless remained the titular head of the state government and remained in office until the election of his successor in 1868.

After his political career ended, Patton became involved in several commercial ventures to establish and build railroads in the state, notably the Alabama and Chattanooga Railroad. He also was a trustee of several schools and colleges, including the University of Alabama. He was instrumental in rebuilding the university after U.S. soldiers burned it during the war.

Patton died on February 28, 1885, at his plantation, Sweetwater, near Florence. He was buried at Maple Hill Cemetery in Huntsville.

Party political offices
Preceded by Thomas H. Watts	Whig nominee for Governor of Alabama; 1865	Succeeded by None
Political offices
Preceded by Lewis E. Parsons	Governor of Alabama; 1865–1868	Succeeded by William Hugh Smith
