= Lewis E. Parsons =

American politician (1817–1895)

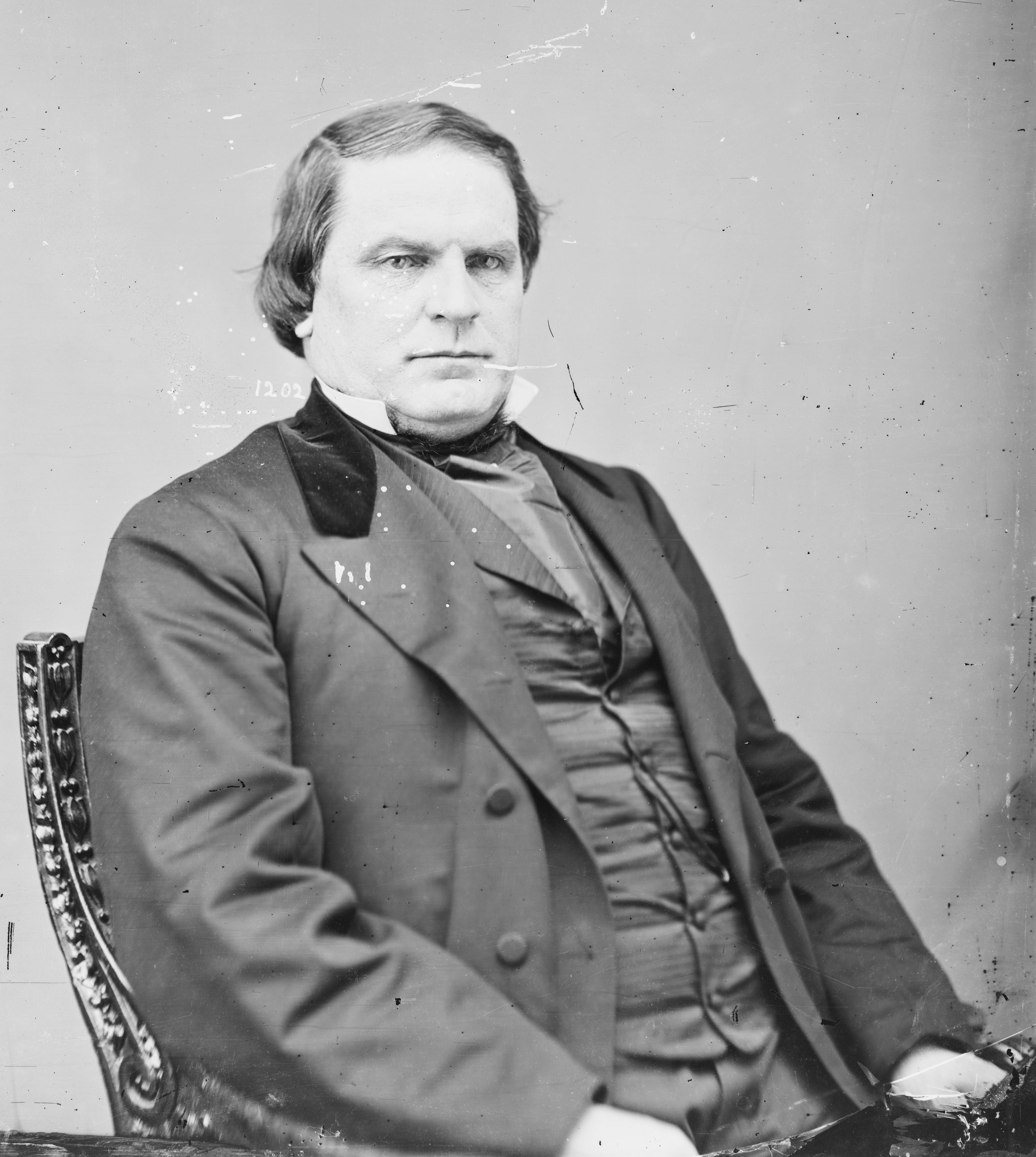
- Parsons, 1865–1880

19th Governor of Alabama
- In office June 21, 1865 – December 13, 1865
- Appointed by: Andrew Johnson
- Preceded by: Thomas H. Watts
- Succeeded by: Robert M. Patton

Personal details
- Born: Lewis Eliphalet Parsons; April 28, 1817 Lisle, New York, US
- Died: June 8, 1895 (aged 78)
- Resting place: Oak Hill Cemetery, Talladega, Alabama
- Party: Whig, Republican

Lewis Eliphalet Parsons (April 28, 1817 – June 8, 1895) was the appointed provisional and the 19th governor of Alabama from June to December 1865, following the American Civil War.

Parsons was Alabama's 19th governor. He was born in Broome County, New York, on April 28, 1817. He was educated in public schools and studied law at the Frederick Tallmadge office in New York and the G.W. Woodward offices in Pennsylvania. Parsons moved to Talladega, Alabama, in 1840 and practiced law with Alexander White. He was a presidential elector in 1856 and 1860 and a member of the Alabama House of Representatives in 1859 and 1865. Parsons fought as a Confederate lieutenant at the brief Battle of Munford near Talladega in April 1865.

In April 1865, Alabama's civil government changed drastically because of the Confederate States Army's surrender. General George H. Thomas was ordered to manage state affairs until a provisional government was appointed. President Andrew Johnson appointed Parsons provisional governor of Alabama on June 21, 1865. His first deed was to reinstate the laws of 1861, except those about slavery. He ordered the election of delegates to a constitutional convention that met on September 12, 1865. The convention repealed the ordinance of secession, renounced the state's war debts, abolished slavery, and scheduled elections to choose state officials and representatives to Congress. He attempted to purchase the panhandle of Florida for Alabama, which sparked rumors that he had access to unclaimed confederate gold. Parsons's term ended on December 13, 1865, with the inauguration of Robert M. Patton. Parsons was elected to the U.S. Senate but was refused his seat by the Republican Party. In addition, he served as U.S. District Attorney for northern Alabama.

== Memoirs of the Civil War ==
One of Parsons' most memorable lectures was made in New York after he visited the devastated city of Selma, Alabama, immediately following the war in 1865:

It happened that Gen. James H. Wilson, of Illinois, with a large force of cavalry, some seventeen thousand (sic), commenced a movement from the Tennessee River, and a point in the northwest of the State of Alabama, diagonally across the State. His troops penetrated to the centre and then radiated from Selma in every direction, through one of the most productive regions of the South. That little city of Selma had about ten thousand inhabitants. Its defenses were carried by assault on one of the first Sunday evenings in April, the sun being about an hour high. Before another sun rose, every house in the city was sacked, except two. Every woman was robbed of her watch, her earrings, her finger-rings, her jewelry of all descriptions; and the whole city was given up, for the time, to the possession of the soldiers. It was a severe discipline to the people. It was thought necessary by the commanding general, to subdue the spirit of rebellion. For one week the forces under General Wilson occupied the little town ... Indeed, after three weeks had elapsed, it was with difficulty you could travel the road from Plantersville to that city (Selma), so offensive was the atmosphere, in consequence of decaying horses and mules that lay along the road-side. Every description of ruin, except the interred dead of the human family, met the eye. I witnessed it myself. The fact is, that no description can equal the reality.

== Death and burial ==
Parsons died on June 8, 1895, and is buried in the Oak Hill Cemetery, Talladega, Alabama.

== Family ==
Parsons' son Lewis E. Parsons Jr. served as United States Attorney for the Northern District of Alabama. His grandson, James K. Parsons was a career United States Army officer who attained the rank of major general and received the Distinguished Service Cross for heroism in World War I.

== Other Sources and Online Links ==
- Sobel, Robert, and John Raimo, eds. Biographical Directory of the Governors of the United States, 1789–1978, Vol.1, Westport, Conn.; Meckler Books, 1978. 4 vols.
- Lewis E. Parsons in Civil War and Reconstruction Governors of Alabama papers at the Alabama Department of Archives and History

Political offices
Preceded by Thomas H. Watts	Governor of Alabama; 1865	Succeeded by Robert M. Patton
