= Journal of Policy History =

- Discipline: Public policy
- Language: English
- Edited by: Donald T. Critchlow; James Strickland

Publication details
- History: 1989–present
- Publisher: Cambridge University Press with Center for American Institutions, Arizona State University (United States)
- Frequency: Quarterly

Standard abbreviations
- ISO 4: J. Policy Hist.

Indexing
- CODEN: JPHIEV
- ISSN: 0898-0306 (print); 1528-4190 (web)
- LCCN: 89656507
- OCLC no.: 749151752

Links
- Journal homepage; Online access; Online archive; Project MUSE

The Journal of Policy History is a quarterly peer-reviewed academic journal of public policy.

== Overview ==
The journal is published by Cambridge University Press, in collaboration with the Center for American Institutions at Arizona State University. Its editors-in-chief are Donald T. Critchlow (Arizona State University) and James Strickland (Arizona State University).
