= Whig Party (United States) =

American political party (1833–1854)

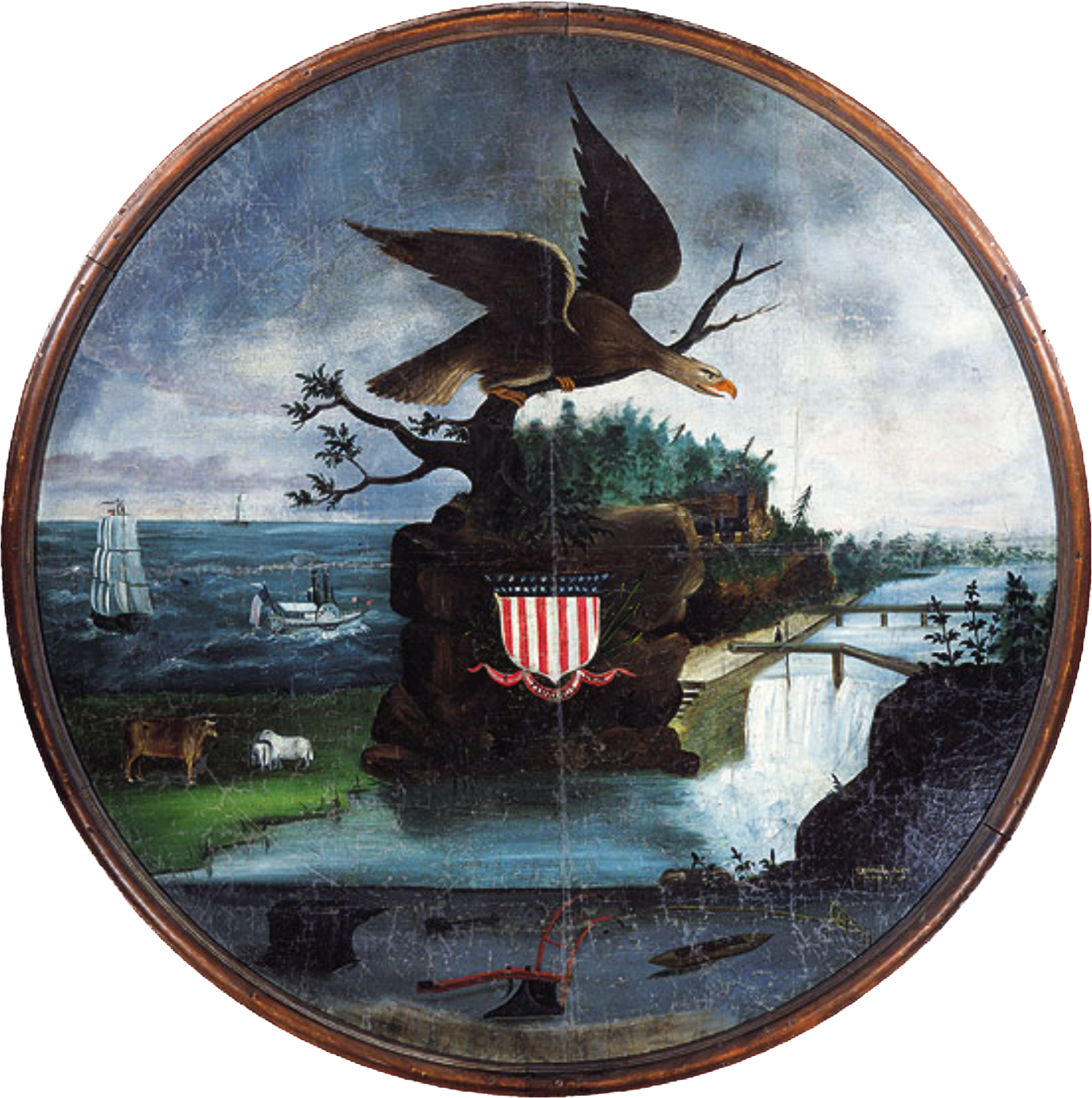
- Whig political banner by Terrence J. Kennedy
- Leader: Henry Clay; Daniel Webster; William Henry Harrison; Zachary Taylor
- Founder: Henry Clay
- Founded: 1833; 193 years ago
- Dissolved: 1856; 170 years ago (National Party); 1865; 161 years ago (Last State Party)
- Merger of: National Republican Party; Anti-Masonic Party
- Preceded by: Federalist Party; National Republican Party; Anti-Masonic Party; Nullifier Party (minority)
- Succeeded by: Republican Party; Know Nothings; Opposition Party; Constitutional Union Party
- Headquarters: Washington, D.C.
- Newspaper: The American Review
- Ideology: American nationalism; American System; Anti-expansionism; Anti-Jacksonianism; Classical liberalism; Protectionism; Parliamentarism; Traditionalist conservatism
- Senate (1841–1843): 29 / 52 (peak)
- House of Representatives (1841): 142 / 242 (peak)

The Whig Party was a political party in the United States that existed from 1833 to 1856. Alongside the Democratic Party, it was one of two major parties from the late 1830s until the early 1850s and part of the Second Party System. As well as four Whig presidents (William Henry Harrison, John Tyler, Zachary Taylor, and Millard Fillmore), other prominent members included Henry Clay, Daniel Webster, Rufus Choate, William Seward, John J. Crittenden, and John Quincy Adams (whose presidency ended prior to the formation of the Whig Party).

The Whig base of support included entrepreneurs, professionals, Protestant Christians (particularly Evangelicals), the urban middle class, and nativists. The party was hostile towards the ideology of "manifest destiny", territorial expansion into Texas and the Southwest, and the Mexican–American War. It disapproved of presidential power as exhibited by Andrew Jackson and James K. Polk, and preferred congressional dominance in governing. Members advocated modernization, meritocracy, the rule of law, protections against majority rule, and vigilance against executive tyranny.

Whigs favored an economic program known as the American System, which called for a protective tariff, federal subsidies for the construction of infrastructure, and support for a national bank. The party was active in both the Northern and Southern United States and did not take a firm stance on slavery, but Northern Whigs tended to be less supportive than their Democratic counterparts.

The Whigs emerged in the 1830s in opposition to U.S. president Andrew Jackson, pulling together former members of the National Republican Party, the Anti-Masonic Party, and disaffected Democrats. The Whigs had some weak links to the defunct Federalist Party, but the Whig Party was not a successor to that party, and many Whig leaders, including Henry Clay, had aligned with the rival Democratic-Republican Party. In the 1836 presidential election, four different Whig candidates received electoral votes, but the party failed to defeat Jackson's chosen successor, Martin Van Buren. Whig nominee William Henry Harrison unseated Van Buren in the 1840 presidential election but died one month into his term. Harrison's successor, John Tyler, a former Democrat, broke with the Whigs in 1841 after clashing with Clay and other party leaders over economic policies such as the re-establishment of a national bank.

Clay clinched his party's nomination in the 1844 presidential election but was defeated by Democrat James K. Polk, who subsequently presided over the Mexican–American War. Whig nominee Zachary Taylor won the 1848 presidential election, but Taylor died in 1850 and was succeeded by Millard Fillmore. Fillmore, Clay, Daniel Webster, and Democrat Stephen A. Douglas led the passage of the Compromise of 1850, which helped to defuse sectional tensions for a time in the aftermath of the Mexican–American War. Nonetheless, the Whigs suffered a decisive defeat in the 1852 presidential election partly due to sectional divisions within the party.

The Whigs collapsed following the passage of the Kansas–Nebraska Act in 1854, with most Northern Whigs eventually joining the anti-slavery Republican Party and most Southern Whigs joining the nativist American Party and later the Constitutional Union Party.

The last vestiges of the Whig Party faded away after the start of the American Civil War, but Whig ideas remained influential for decades. During the presidency of Abraham Lincoln, ex-Whigs dominated the Republican Party and enacted much of their American System. Presidents Abraham Lincoln, Rutherford B. Hayes, Chester A. Arthur, and Benjamin Harrison were Whigs before switching to the Republican Party, from which they were elected to office. It is considered the primary predecessor party of the 21st century Republicans.

== Background ==
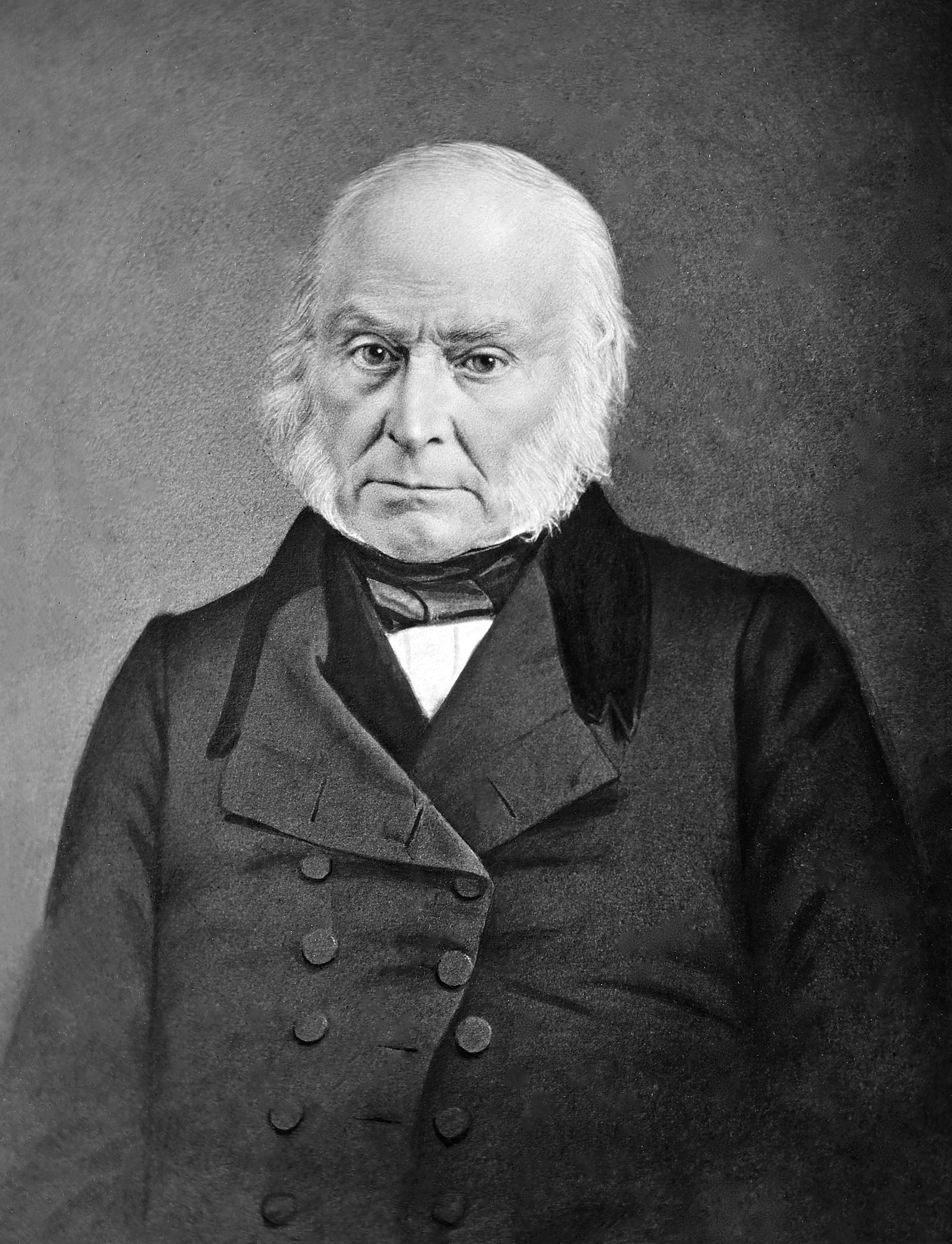
John Quincy Adams, the 6th president, became a Whig congressman later in his career.

During the 1790s, the first major U.S. parties arose in the form of the Federalist Party, led by Alexander Hamilton, and the Democratic-Republican Party, led by Thomas Jefferson. After 1815, the Democratic-Republicans emerged as the sole major party at the national level but became increasingly polarized. A nationalist wing led by Henry Clay favored policies such as the Second Bank of the United States and the implementation of a protective tariff. A second group, the Old Republicans, opposed these policies, favoring a strict interpretation of the Constitution and a weak federal government.

In the 1824 presidential election, Speaker of the House Henry Clay, Secretary of the Treasury William H. Crawford, Secretary of State John Quincy Adams, and General Andrew Jackson all sought the presidency as members of the Democratic-Republican Party. Crawford favored state sovereignty and a strict constructionist view of the Constitution, while Clay and Adams favored high tariffs and the national bank; regionalism played a central role, with Jackson strongest in the West. Jackson won a plurality of the popular and electoral vote in the 1824 election, but not a majority. The House of Representatives had to decide. Speaker Clay supported Adams, who was elected as president by the House, and Clay was appointed Secretary of State. Jackson called it a "corrupt bargain".

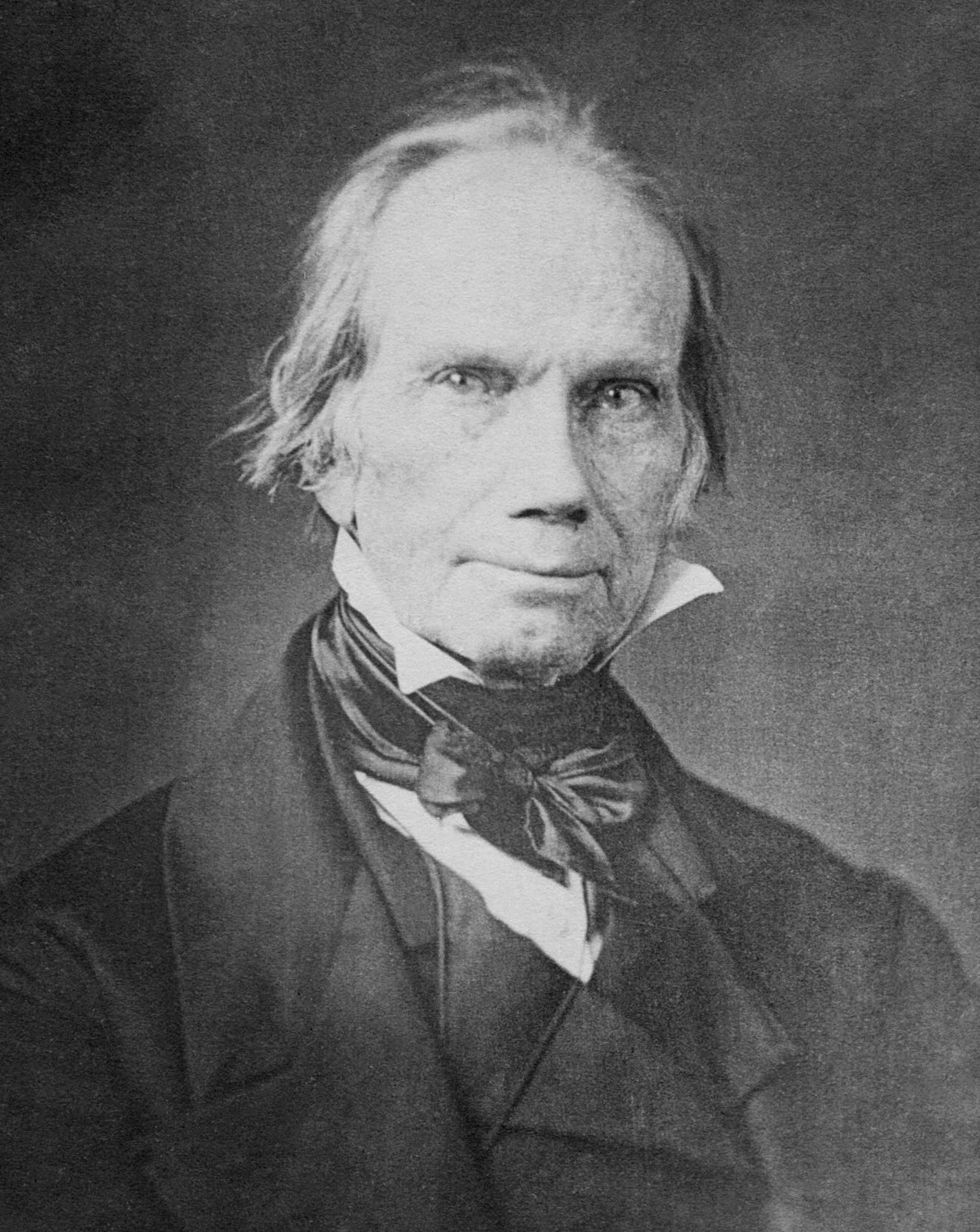
Henry Clay, a founder of the Whig Party in the 1830s and its 1844 presidential nominee

In the years following the 1824 election, former members of the Democratic-Republican Party split into hostile factions. Supporters of President Adams and Clay joined with many former Federalists such as Daniel Webster to form a group informally known as the "Adams party". Meanwhile, supporters of Jackson, Crawford, and Vice President John C. Calhoun joined in opposing the Adams administration's nationalist agenda, becoming informally known as "Jacksonians". Due in part to the superior organization (by Martin Van Buren) of the Jacksonians, Jackson defeated Adams in the 1828 presidential election, taking 56 percent of the popular vote. Clay became the leader of the National Republican Party, which opposed President Jackson. By the early 1830s, the Jacksonians organized into the new Democratic Party.

Despite Jackson's decisive victory in the 1828 election, National Republicans initially believed that Jackson's party would collapse once Jackson took office. Vice President Calhoun split from the administration in 1831. Still, differences over the tariff prevented Calhoun's followers from joining the National Republicans.

Meanwhile, the Anti-Masonic Party formed following the disappearance and possible murder of William Morgan in 1826. The Anti-Masonic movement, strongest in the Northeast, gave rise to or expanded the use of many innovations that became an accepted practice among other parties, including nominating conventions and party newspapers. Clay rejected overtures from the Anti-Masonic Party, and his attempt to convince Calhoun to serve as his running mate failed, leaving the opposition to Jackson split among different leaders when the National Republicans nominated Clay for president.

Hoping to make the national bank a key issue of the 1832 election, the National Republicans convinced Nicholas Biddle, president of the Second National Bank, to request an extension of the bank's charter, but their strategy backfired when Jackson successfully portrayed his veto of the recharter as a victory for the people against an elitist institution. Jackson won another decisive victory in the 1832 presidential election, taking 55 percent of the national popular vote and 88 percent of the popular vote in the slavery states south of Kentucky and Maryland. Clay's defeat discredited the National Republican Party, encouraging those opposed to Jackson to seek to create a more effective opposition party. Jackson, by 1832, was determined to destroy the bank, which Whigs supported.

== History ==
=== Creation, 1833–1836 ===
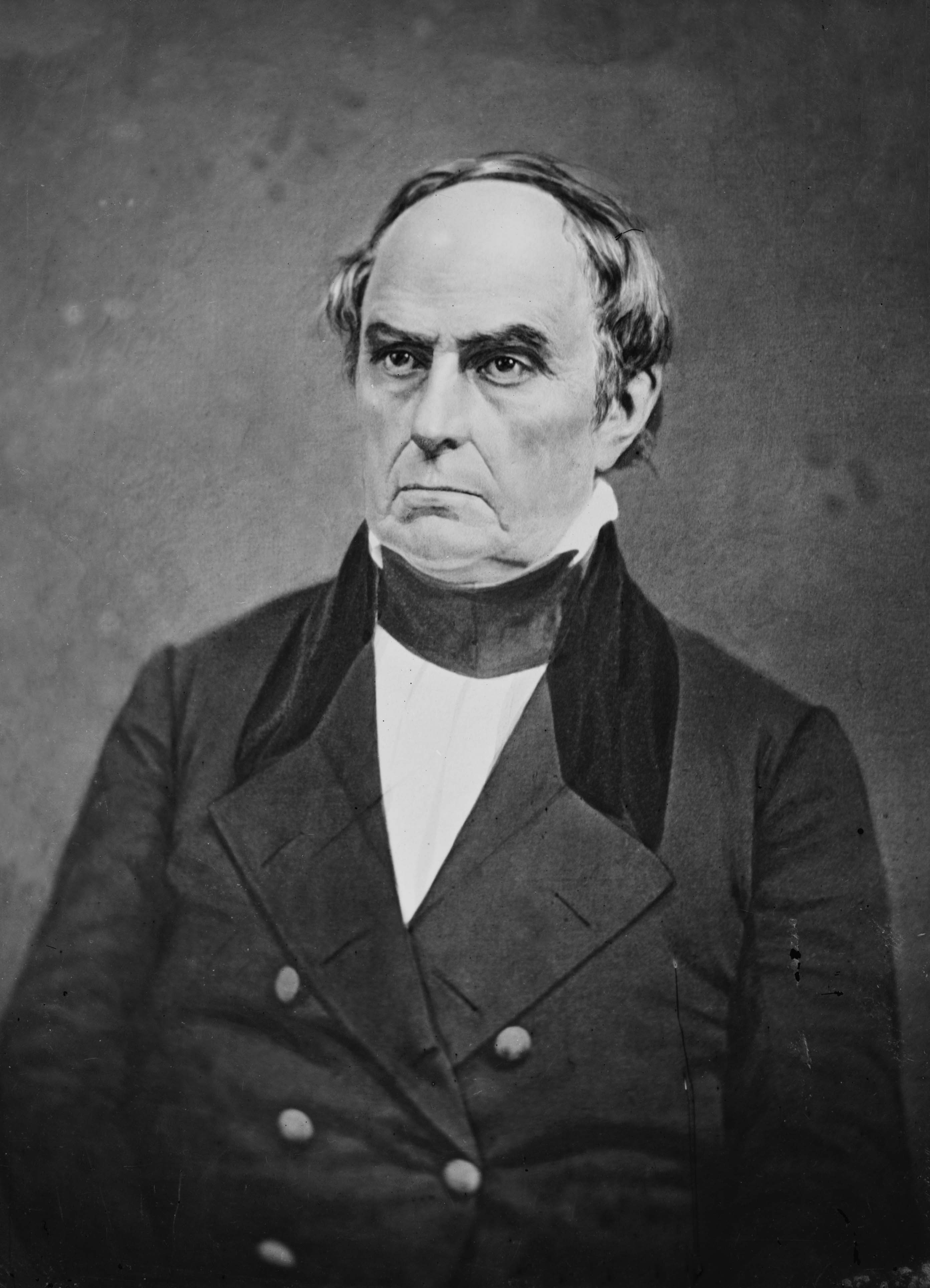
Daniel Webster, a leading Whig from New England

Shortly after Jackson's re-election, South Carolina passed a measure to "nullify" the Tariff of 1832, beginning the Nullification Crisis. Jackson strongly denied the right of South Carolina to nullify federal law, but the crisis was resolved after Congress passed the Tariff of 1833. The Nullification Crisis briefly scrambled the partisan divisions that had emerged after 1824, as many within the Jacksonian coalition opposed President Jackson's threats of force against South Carolina, while some opposition leaders like Daniel Webster supported them.

The name "Whig" was first suggested for Jackson's opponents by James Watson Webb, editor of the Courier and Enquirer of New York City. In South Carolina and other states, those opposed to Jackson began to form small "Whig" parties. The Whig label implicitly compared "King Andrew" to King George III, the King of Great Britain at the time of the American Revolution.

Jackson's decision to remove government deposits from the national bank (Note: Though Jackson had vetoed a re-charter bill, the bank still retained federal deposits at the start of his second term. The national bank's federal charter expired in 1836.) ended any possibility of a Webster-Jackson alliance and helped to solidify partisan lines. The removal of the deposits drew opposition from both pro-bank National Republicans and states' rights Southerners like Willie Person Mangum of North Carolina, the latter of whom accused Jackson of flouting the Constitution. In late 1833, Clay began to hold a series of dinners with opposition leaders to settle on a candidate to oppose Martin Van Buren, the likely Democratic nominee in the 1836 presidential election. While Jackson's opponents could not agree on a single presidential candidate, they coordinated in the Senate to oppose Jackson's initiatives. Historian Michael Holt writes that the "birth of the Whig Party" can be dated to Clay and his allies taking control of the Senate in December 1833.

The National Republicans, including Clay and Webster, formed the core of the Whig Party, but many Anti-Masons such as William H. Seward of New York and Thaddeus Stevens of Pennsylvania also joined. Several prominent Democrats defected to the Whigs, including Mangum, former Attorney General John Berrien, and John Tyler of Virginia. The Whig Party's first significant action was to censure Jackson for the removal of the national bank deposits, thereby establishing opposition to Jackson's executive power as the organizing principle of the new party.

In doing so, the Whigs were able to shed the elitist image that had persistently hindered the National Republicans. Throughout 1834 and 1835, the Whigs successfully incorporated National Republican and Anti-Masonic state-level organizations and established new state party organizations in Southern states like North Carolina and Georgia. The Anti-Masonic heritage of the Whigs included a distrust of behind-the-scenes political maneuvering by party bosses instead of encouraging direct appeals to the people through gigantic rallies, parades, and impassioned advocacy.

=== Rise, 1836–1841 ===
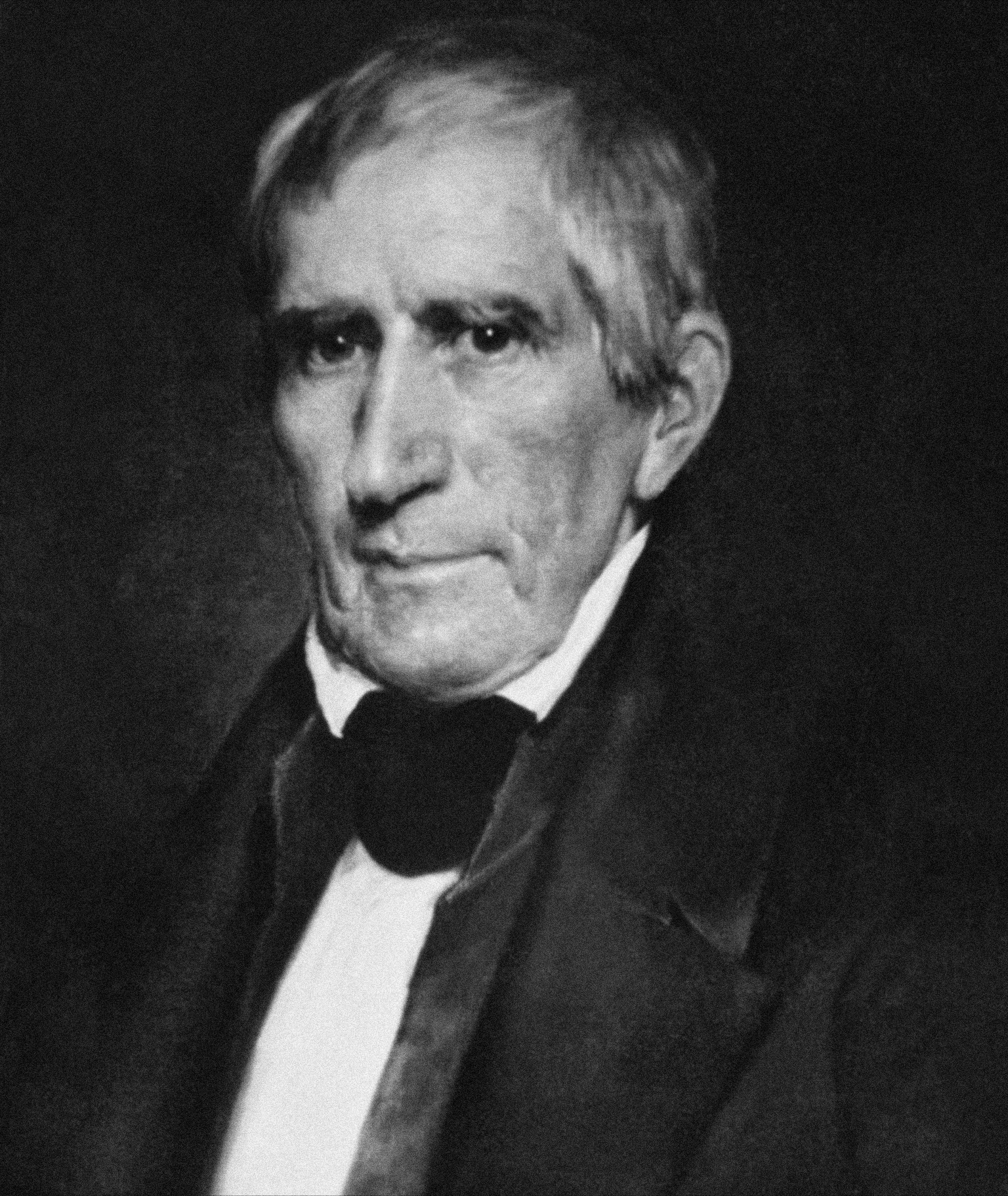
William Henry Harrison, a two-time presidential candidate who became the first Whig president in 1841 but died just one month into office

Early successes in various states made many Whigs optimistic about victory in 1836, but an improving economy bolstered Van Buren's standing ahead of the election. The Whigs also faced the difficulty of uniting former National Republicans, Anti-Masons, and states' rights Southerners around one candidate, and the party suffered an early blow when Calhoun announced that he would refuse to support any candidate opposed to the doctrine of nullification. Northern Whigs cast aside both Clay and Webster in favor of General William Henry Harrison, a former senator who had led U.S. forces in the 1811 Battle of Tippecanoe.

Though he had not previously been affiliated with the National Republicans, Harrison indicated that he shared the party's concerns over Jackson's executive power and favored federal investments in infrastructure. Southern Whigs coalesced around Senator Hugh Lawson White, a long-time Jackson ally who opposed Van Buren's candidacy. Ultimately, Van Buren won a majority of the electoral and popular vote in the 1836 election, though the Whigs improved on Clay's 1832 performance in the South and West.

Shortly after Van Buren took office, an economic crisis known as the Panic of 1837 struck the nation. Land prices plummeted, industries laid off employees, and banks failed. According to historian Daniel Walker Howe, the economic crisis of the late 1830s and early 1840s was the most severe recession in U.S. history until the Great Depression. Van Buren's economic response centered on establishing the Independent Treasury system, essentially a series of vaults that would hold government deposits. As the debate over the Independent Treasury continued, William Cabell Rives and some other Democrats who favored a more activist government defected to the Whig Party, while Calhoun and his followers joined the Democratic Party. Whig leaders agreed to hold the party's first national convention in December 1839 in order to select the Whig presidential nominee.

William Henry Harrison defeated Martin Van Buren in the 1840 presidential election, thereby becoming the first Whig president.

By early 1838, Clay had emerged as the front-runner due to his southern support and spirited opposition to Van Buren's Independent Treasury. A recovering economy convinced other Whigs to support Harrison, who was generally seen as the Whig candidate best able to win over Democrats and new voters. With the crucial support of Thaddeus Stevens of Pennsylvania and Thurlow Weed of New York, Harrison won the presidential nomination on the fifth ballot of the 1839 Whig National Convention.

For vice president, the Whigs nominated John Tyler, a former states' rights Democrat selected for the Whig ticket primarily because other Southern supporters of Clay refused to serve as Harrison's running mate. Log cabins and hard cider became the dominant symbols of the Whig campaign as the party sought to portray Harrison as a man of the people. The Whigs also assailed Van Buren's handling of the economy. They argued that traditional Whig policies, such as the restoration of a national bank and the implementation of protective tariff rates, would help to restore the economy. With the economy still in a downturn, Harrison decisively defeated Van Buren, taking a wide majority of the electoral vote and just under 53 percent of the popular vote.

=== Harrison and Tyler, 1841–1845 ===
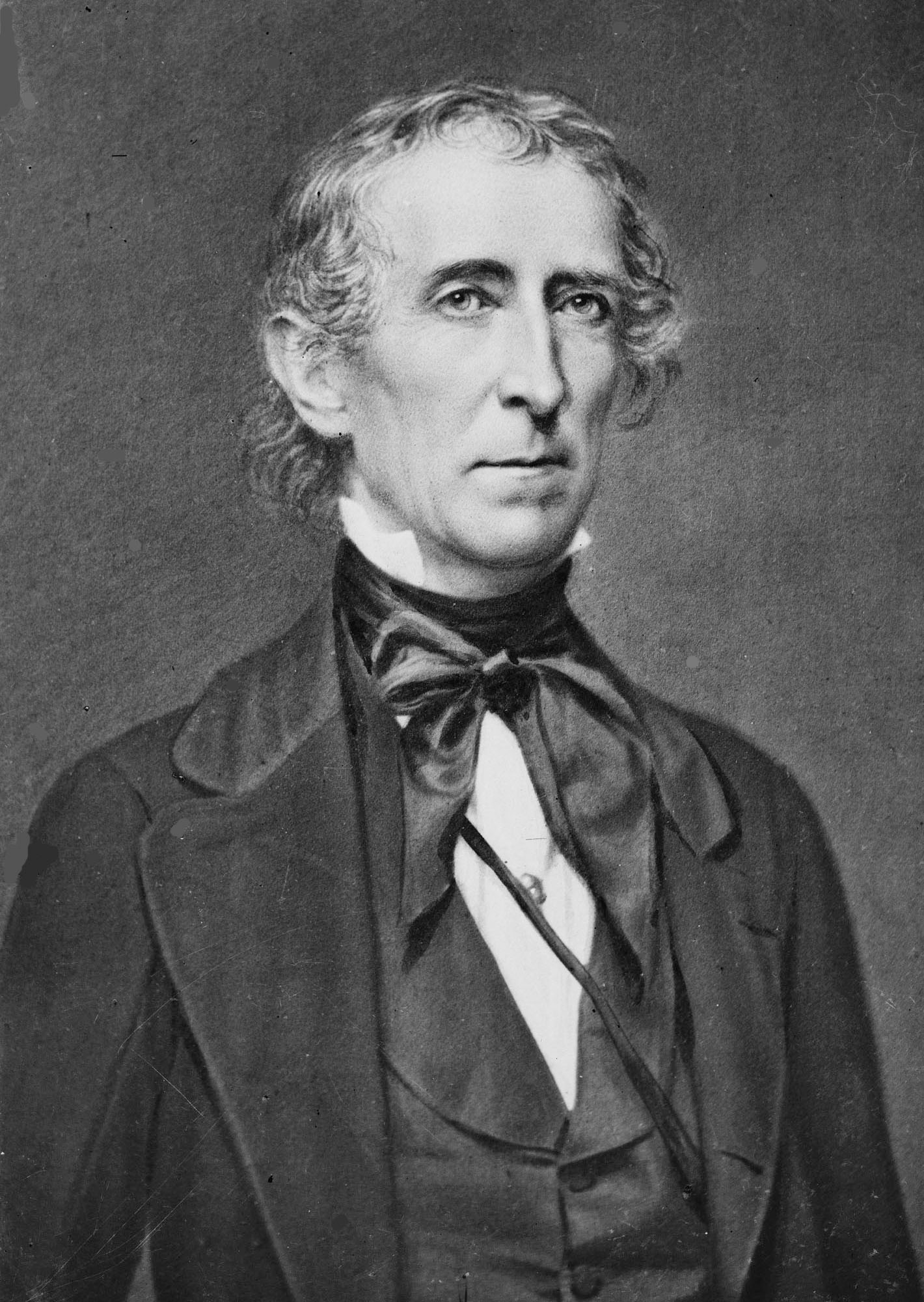
President John Tyler clashed with congressional Whigs and was expelled from the party.

With the election of the first Whig presidential administration in the party's history, Clay and his allies prepared to pass ambitious domestic policies such as the restoration of the national bank, the distribution of federal land sales revenue to the states, a national bankruptcy law, and increased tariff rates. Harrison died just one month into his term, thereby elevating Vice President Tyler to the presidency. Tyler had never accepted much of the Whig economic program and he soon clashed with Clay and other congressional Whigs. In August 1841, Tyler vetoed Clay's national bank bill, holding that the legislation was unconstitutional.

Congress passed a second bill based on an earlier proposal made by Treasury Secretary Ewing that was tailored to address Tyler's constitutional concerns, but Tyler vetoed that bill as well. In response, every Cabinet member but Webster resigned, and the Whig congressional caucus expelled Tyler from the party on September 13, 1841. The Whigs later began impeachment proceedings against Tyler, but they ultimately failed to impeach him because they believed his likely acquittal would devastate the party.

Beginning in mid-1842, Tyler increasingly began to court Democrats, appointing them to his Cabinet and other positions. At the same time, many Whig state organizations repudiated the Tyler administration and endorsed Clay as the party's candidate in the 1844 presidential election. After Webster resigned from the Cabinet in May 1843 following the conclusion of the Webster-Ashburton Treaty, Tyler made the annexation of Texas his key priority. The annexation of Texas was widely viewed as a pro-slavery initiative as it would add another slave state to the union, and most leaders of both parties opposed opening the question of annexation in 1843 due to the fear of stoking the debate over slavery. Tyler was nonetheless determined to pursue annexation because he believed that the British conspired to abolish slavery in Texas (Note: In actuality, the government of British Prime Minister Robert Peel had little interest in pushing abolitionism in Texas.) and because he saw the issue as a means to reelection, either through the Democratic Party or through a new party. In April 1844, Secretary of State John C. Calhoun reached a treaty with Texas providing for the annexation of that country.

Clay and Van Buren, the two front-runners for major-party presidential nominations in the 1844 election, both announced their opposition to annexation, and the Senate blocked the annexation treaty. To the surprise of Clay and other Whigs, the 1844 Democratic National Convention rejected Van Buren in favor of James K. Polk and established a platform calling for the acquisition of both Texas and Oregon Country. Having won the presidential nomination at the 1844 Whig National Convention unopposed, Clay and other Whigs were initially confident that they would defeat the divided Democrats and their relatively obscure candidate.

Nonetheless, Southern voters responded to Polk's calls for annexation, while in the North, Democrats benefited from the growing animosity towards the Whig Party among Catholic and foreign-born voters. Ultimately, Polk won the election, taking 49.5% of the popular vote and a majority of the electoral vote; the swing of just over one percent of the vote in New York would have given Clay the victory.

=== Polk and the Mexican–American War, 1845–1849 ===
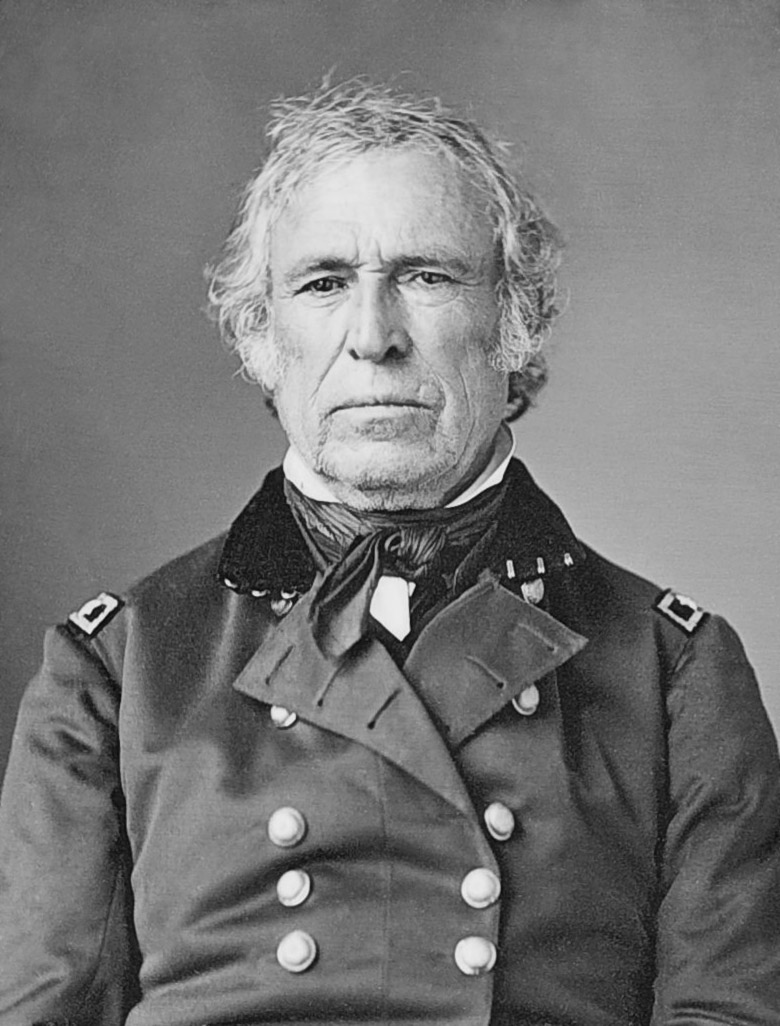
Zachary Taylor served in the Mexican–American War and later won the 1848 presidential election as the Whig nominee.

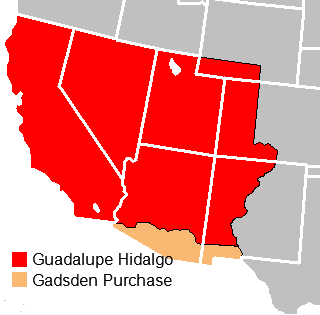
The United States settled the Texas-Mexico border and acquired portions of seven current states in the Treaty of Guadalupe Hidalgo. Portions of present-day Arizona and New Mexico were later acquired in the 1853 Gadsden Purchase.

In the final weeks of Tyler's presidency, a small group of Southern Whigs joined with congressional Democrats to pass a joint resolution providing for the annexation of Texas, and Texas subsequently became a state in 1845. Following the annexation of Texas, Polk began preparations for a potential war with Mexico, which still regarded Texas as a part of its republic and contended that Texas's true southern border was the Nueces River rather than the Rio Grande. After a skirmish known as the Thornton Affair broke out on the northern side of the Rio Grande, Polk called on Congress to declare war against Mexico, arguing that Mexico had invaded American territory by crossing the Rio Grande.

Many Whigs argued that Polk had provoked war with Mexico by sending a force under General Zachary Taylor to the Rio Grande, but only a minority of Whigs voted against the declaration of war as they feared that opposing the war would be politically unpopular. Polk received the declaration of war against Mexico and also pushed through the restoration of the Independent Treasury System and a bill that reduced tariffs; opposition to the passage of these Democratic policies helped to reunify and reinvigorate the Whigs.

In August 1846, Polk asked Congress to appropriate $2 million (~$64 million in 2025) in hopes of using that money as a down payment for the purchase of California in a treaty with Mexico. Democratic Congressman David Wilmot of Pennsylvania offered an amendment known as the Wilmot Proviso, which would ban slavery in any newly acquired lands. The Wilmot Proviso passed the House with the support of both Northern Whigs and Northern Democrats, breaking the typical pattern of partisan division in congressional votes, but it was defeated in the Senate.

Nonetheless, clear divisions remained between the two parties on territorial acquisitions, as most Democrats joined Polk in seeking to acquire vast tracts of land from Mexico, but most Whigs opposed territorial growth. In February 1848, Mexican and U.S. negotiators reached the Treaty of Guadalupe Hidalgo, which provided for the cession of Alta California and New Mexico. Despite Whig objections to the acquisition of Mexican territory, the treaty was ratified with the support of a majority of the Democratic and Whig senators; Whigs voted for the treaty largely because ratification brought the war to an immediate end.

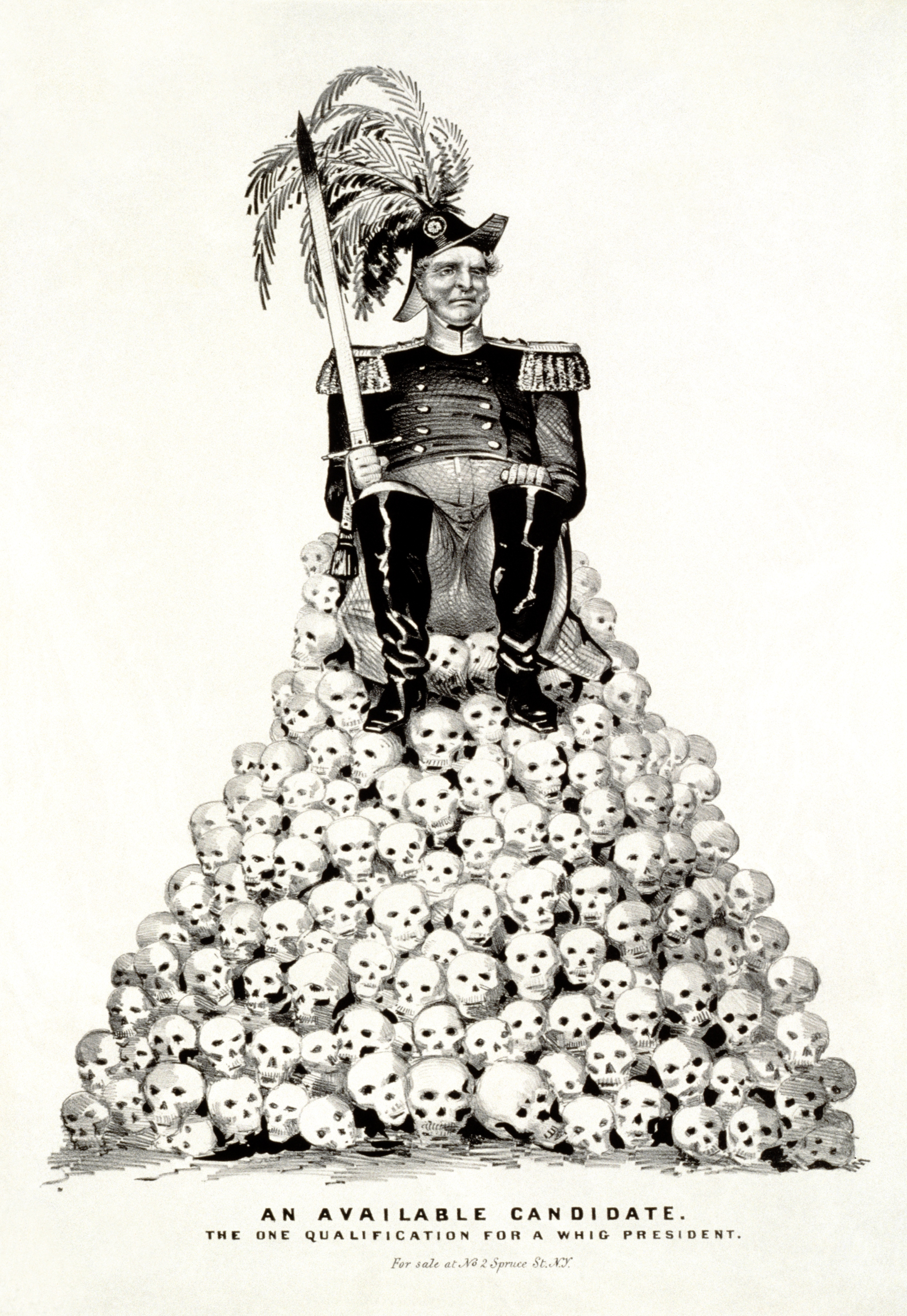
A political cartoon satirizing the candidacy of either Zachary Taylor or Winfield Scott in the 1848 presidential election

During the war, Whig leaders like John J. Crittenden of Kentucky began to look to General Taylor as a presidential candidate, hoping the party could run on Taylor's personal popularity rather than economic issues. Taylor's candidacy faced significant resistance in the Whig Party due to his lack of public commitment to Whig policies and his association with the Mexican–American War. In late 1847, Clay emerged as Taylor's main opponent for the Whig nomination, appealing especially to Northern Whigs with his opposition to the war and the acquisition of new territory.

With strong backing from slavery-state delegates, Taylor won the presidential nomination on the fourth ballot of the 1848 Whig National Convention. The Whigs nominated Millard Fillmore of New York, a pro-Clay Northerner, for vice president. Anti-slavery Northern Whigs disaffected with Taylor joined with Democratic supporters of Martin Van Buren and some members of the Liberty Party to found the new Free Soil Party; the party nominated a ticket of Van Buren and Whig Charles Francis Adams Sr. and campaigned against the spread of slavery into the territories.

The Whig campaign in the North received a boost when Taylor released a public letter in which he stated that he favored Whig principles and would defer to Congress after taking office, thereby reassuring some wavering Whigs. During the campaign, Northern Whig leaders touted traditional Whig policies like support for infrastructure spending and increased tariff rates, but Southern Whigs largely eschewed economic policy, instead emphasizing that Taylor's status as an enslaver meant that he could be trusted on the issue of slavery more so than Democratic candidate Lewis Cass of Michigan. Ultimately, Taylor won the election with a majority of the electoral vote and a plurality of the popular vote. Taylor improved on Clay's 1844 performance in the South and benefited from the defection of many Democrats to Van Buren in the North.

=== Taylor and Fillmore, 1849–1853 ===
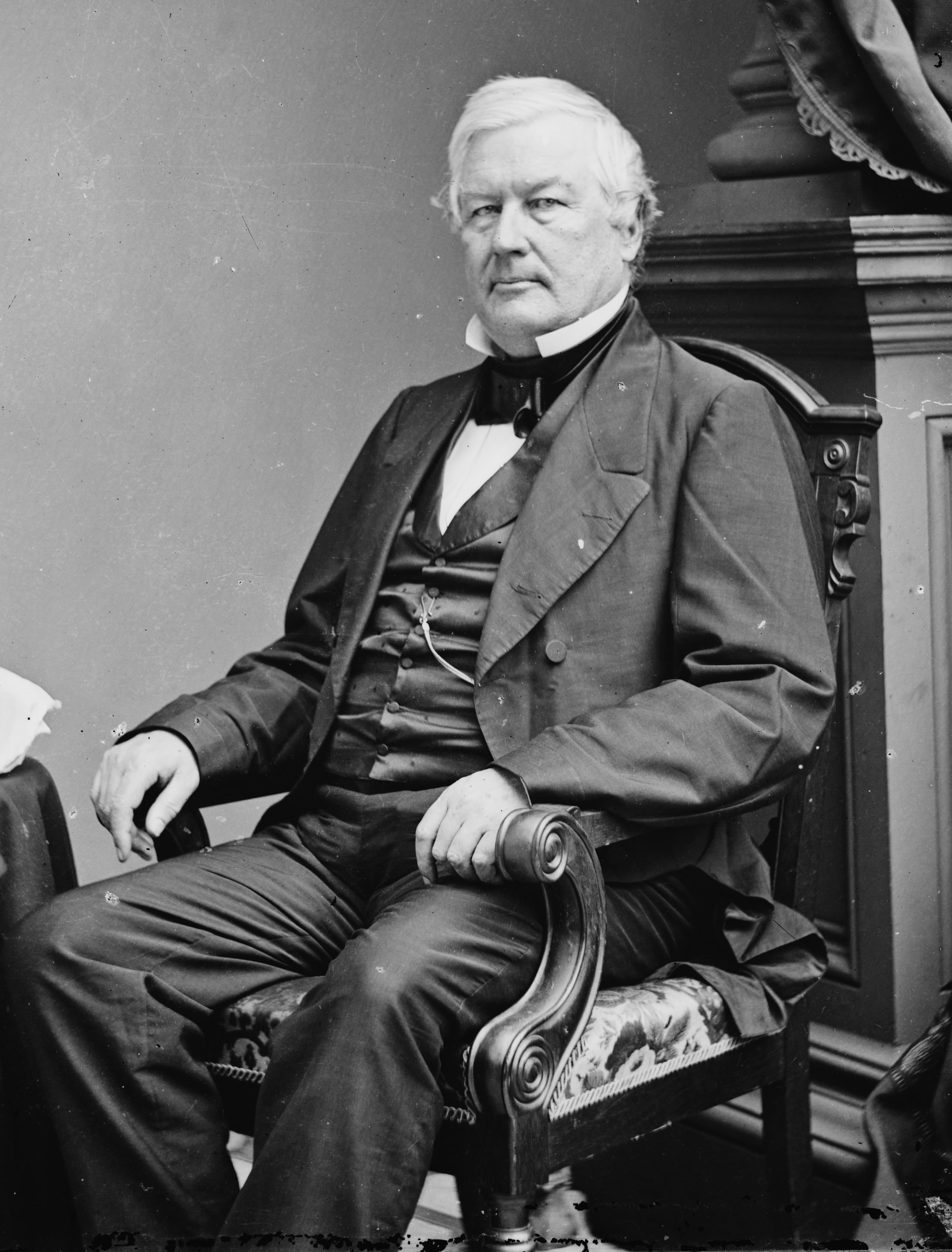
Millard Fillmore, the last Whig president

Reflecting the Taylor administration's desire to find a middle ground between traditional Whig and Democratic policies, Secretary of the Treasury William M. Meredith issued a report calling for an increase in tariff rates, but not to the levels seen under the Tariff of 1842. Even Meredith's moderate policies were not adopted, and, partly due to the strong economic growth of the late 1840s and late 1850s, traditional Whig economic stances would increasingly lose their salience after 1848. When Taylor assumed office, the organization of state and territorial governments and the status of slavery in the Mexican Cession remained the major issue facing Congress.

To sidestep the issue of the Wilmot Proviso, the Taylor administration proposed that the lands of the Mexican Cession be admitted as states without first organizing territorial governments; thus, slavery in the area would be left to the discretion of state governments rather than the federal government. In January 1850, Senator Clay introduced a separate proposal that included the admission of California as a free state, the cession by Texas of some of its northern and western territorial claims in return for debt relief, the establishment of New Mexico and Utah territories, a ban on the importation of slaves into the District of Columbia for sale, and a more stringent fugitive slave law.

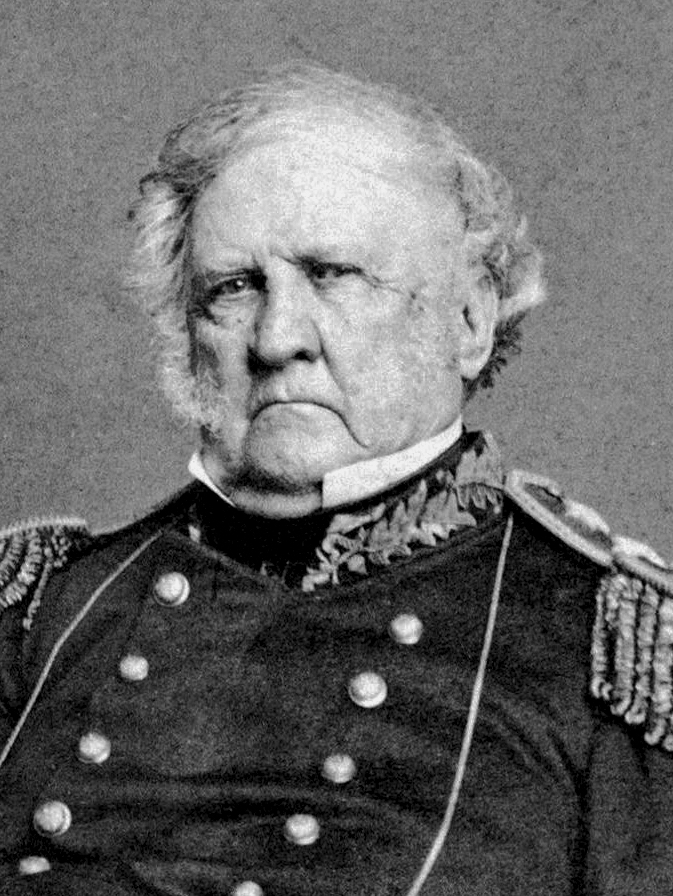
Gen. Winfield Scott, the unsuccessful Whig candidate in the 1852 presidential election

Taylor died in July 1850 and was succeeded by Vice President Fillmore. In contrast to John Tyler, Fillmore's legitimacy and authority as president were widely accepted by members of Congress and the public. Fillmore accepted the resignation of Taylor's entire Cabinet and appointed Whig leaders like Crittenden, Thomas Corwin of Ohio, and Webster, whose support for the Compromise had outraged his Massachusetts constituents. With the support of Fillmore and an impressive bipartisan and bi-sectional coalition, a Senate bill providing for a final settlement of Texas's borders won passage shortly after Fillmore took office.

The Senate quickly moved to other significant issues, passing bills that provided for the admission of California, the organization of New Mexico Territory, and the establishment of a new fugitive slave law. Passage of what became known as the Compromise of 1850 soon followed in the House of Representatives. Though the future of slavery in New Mexico, Utah, and other territories remained unclear, Fillmore himself described the Compromise of 1850 as a "final settlement" of sectional issues.

Following the passage of the Compromise of 1850, Fillmore's enforcement of the Fugitive Slave Act of 1850 became the central issue of his administration. The Whig Party became badly split between pro-Compromise Whigs like Fillmore and Webster and anti-Compromise Whigs like William Seward, who demanded the repeal of the Fugitive Slave Act.

Though Fillmore's enforcement of the Fugitive Slave Act made him unpopular among many in the North, he retained considerable support in the South. Meanwhile, Secretary Webster had long coveted the presidency and, though in poor health, planned a final attempt to gain the White House. A third candidate emerged in the form of General Winfield Scott, who won the backing of many Northerners but whose association with Senator William Seward made him unacceptable to Southern Whigs.

On the first presidential ballot of the 1852 Whig National Convention, Fillmore received 133 of the necessary 147 votes, while Scott won 131 and Webster won 29. Fillmore and Webster's supporters were unable to broker a deal to unite behind either candidate, and Scott won the nomination on the 53rd ballot. The 1852 Democratic National Convention nominated a dark horse candidate in the form of former New Hampshire senator Franklin Pierce, a Northerner sympathetic to the Southern view on slavery.

As the Whig and Democratic national conventions had approved similar platforms, the 1852 election focused largely on the personalities of Scott and Pierce. The 1852 elections proved to be disastrous for the Whig Party, as Scott was defeated by a wide margin and the Whigs lost several congressional and state elections. Scott amassed more votes than Taylor had in most Northern states, but Democrats benefited from a surge of new voters in the North and the collapse of Whig strength in much of the South.

== Collapse ==
Despite their decisive loss in the 1852 elections, most Whig leaders believed the party could recover during the Pierce presidency in much the same way that it had recovered under President Polk. The strong economy still prevented the Whig economic program from regaining salience, however, and the party failed to develop an effective platform on which to campaign. The debate over the 1854 Kansas–Nebraska Act, which effectively repealed the Missouri Compromise by allowing slavery in territories north of the 36°30′ parallel, shook up traditional partisan alignments.

Across the Northern states, opposition to the Kansas–Nebraska Act gave rise to anti-Nebraska coalitions consisting of Democrats focused on this opposition along with Free Soilers and Whigs. In Michigan and Wisconsin, these two coalitions labeled themselves as the Republican Party, but similar groups in other states initially took on different names. Like their Free Soil predecessors, Republican leaders generally did not call for the abolition of slavery but instead sought to prevent the extension of slavery into the territories.

Another political coalition appeared in the form of the nativist and anti-Catholic Know Nothing movement, which eventually organized itself into the American Party. Both the Republican Party and the Know-Nothings portrayed themselves as the natural Whig heirs in the battle against Democratic executive tyranny, but the Republicans focused on the "Slave Power" and the Know-Nothings focused on the supposed danger of mass immigration and a Catholic conspiracy. While the Republican Party almost exclusively appealed to Northerners, the Know-Nothings gathered many adherents in both the North and South; some individuals joined both groups even while they remained part of the Whig Party or the Democratic Party.

Congressional Democrats suffered huge losses in the mid-term elections of 1854, as voters supported a wide array of new parties opposed to the Democratic Party. Though several successful congressional candidates had campaigned only as Whigs, most congressional candidates who were unaffiliated with the Democratic Party had campaigned either independently of the Whig Party or in collusion with another party. As cooperation between Northern and Southern Whigs increasingly appeared impossible, leaders from both sections continued to abandon the party. Though he did not share the nativist views of the Know-Nothings, in 1855, Fillmore became a member of the Know-Nothing movement and encouraged his Whig followers to join as well. In September 1855, Seward led his faction of Whigs into the Republican Party, effectively marking the end of the Whig Party as an independent and significant political force. Thus, the 1856 presidential election became a three-sided contest between Democrats, Know-Nothings, and Republicans.

The Know Nothing National Convention nominated Fillmore for president, but disagreements over the party platform's stance on slavery caused many Northern Know-Nothings to abandon the party. Meanwhile, the 1856 Republican National Convention chose John C. Frémont as the party's presidential candidate. The defection of many Northern Know-Nothings, combined with the caning of Charles Sumner and other events that stoked sectional tensions, bolstered Republicans throughout the North. During his campaign, Fillmore minimized the issue of nativism, instead attempting to use his campaign as a platform for unionism and a revival of the Whig Party.

Seeking to rally support from Whigs who had yet to join another party, Fillmore and his allies organized the sparsely attended 1856 Whig National Convention, which nominated Fillmore for president. Ultimately, Democrat James Buchanan won the election with a majority of the electoral vote and 45 percent of the popular vote; Frémont won most of the remaining electoral votes and took 33 percent of the popular vote, while Fillmore won 22 percent of the popular vote and just eight electoral votes. Fillmore largely retained Taylor and Scott voters in the South, but most former Whigs in the North voted for Frémont rather than Fillmore.

Fillmore's American Party collapsed after the 1856 election, and many former Whigs who refused to join the Democratic Party or the Republican Party organized themselves into a loose coalition known as the Opposition Party. For the 1860 presidential election, Senator John J. Crittenden and other unionist conservatives formed the Constitutional Union Party. The party nominated a ticket consisting of John Bell, a long-time Whig senator, and Edward Everett, who had succeeded Daniel Webster as Fillmore's Secretary of State. With the nomination of two former Whigs, many regarded the Constitutional Union Party as a continuation of the Whig Party; one Southern newspaper called the new party the "ghost of the old Whig Party".

The party campaigned on preserving the union and took an official non-stance on slavery. The Constitutional Union ticket won a plurality of the vote in three states, but Bell finished in fourth place in the national popular vote behind Republican Abraham Lincoln, Democrat Stephen A. Douglas, and pro-Southern Democrat John C. Breckinridge. In the North, most former Whigs, including the vast majority of those who had voted for Fillmore in 1856, voted for Lincoln in 1860.

In the secession crisis that followed Lincoln's election, Southern Democrats generally led secession efforts, while Southern former Whigs generally opposed immediate secession. During the American Civil War, former Whigs formed the core of a "proto-party" in the Confederacy that was opposed to the Jefferson Davis administration. In the Reconstruction Era, many former Whigs tried to regroup in the South, calling themselves "conservatives" and hoping to reconnect with ex-Whigs in the North. Thus, in Virginia and elsewhere, moderate, nationalist, and economically innovative ex-Whigs used the party name "Conservative" to avoid identifying with the Democratic Party. The Conservative Party ultimately merged into the Democratic Party in the South, but ex-Whigs continued to promote modernization policies such as large-scale railroad construction and the founding of public schools.

The Whig Party vanished after the 1850s, but Whiggism, as a modernizing policy orientation, persisted for decades. It played a major role in shaping the modernizing policies of the state governments during Reconstruction. During the Lincoln Administration, ex-Whigs dominated the Republican Party and enacted much of their American System. Presidents Abraham Lincoln, Rutherford B. Hayes, Chester A. Arthur, and Benjamin Harrison were Whigs before switching to the Republican Party, from which they were elected to office. In the long run, the United States adopted Whiggish economic policies coupled with a Democratic strong presidency.

== Ideology and policies ==
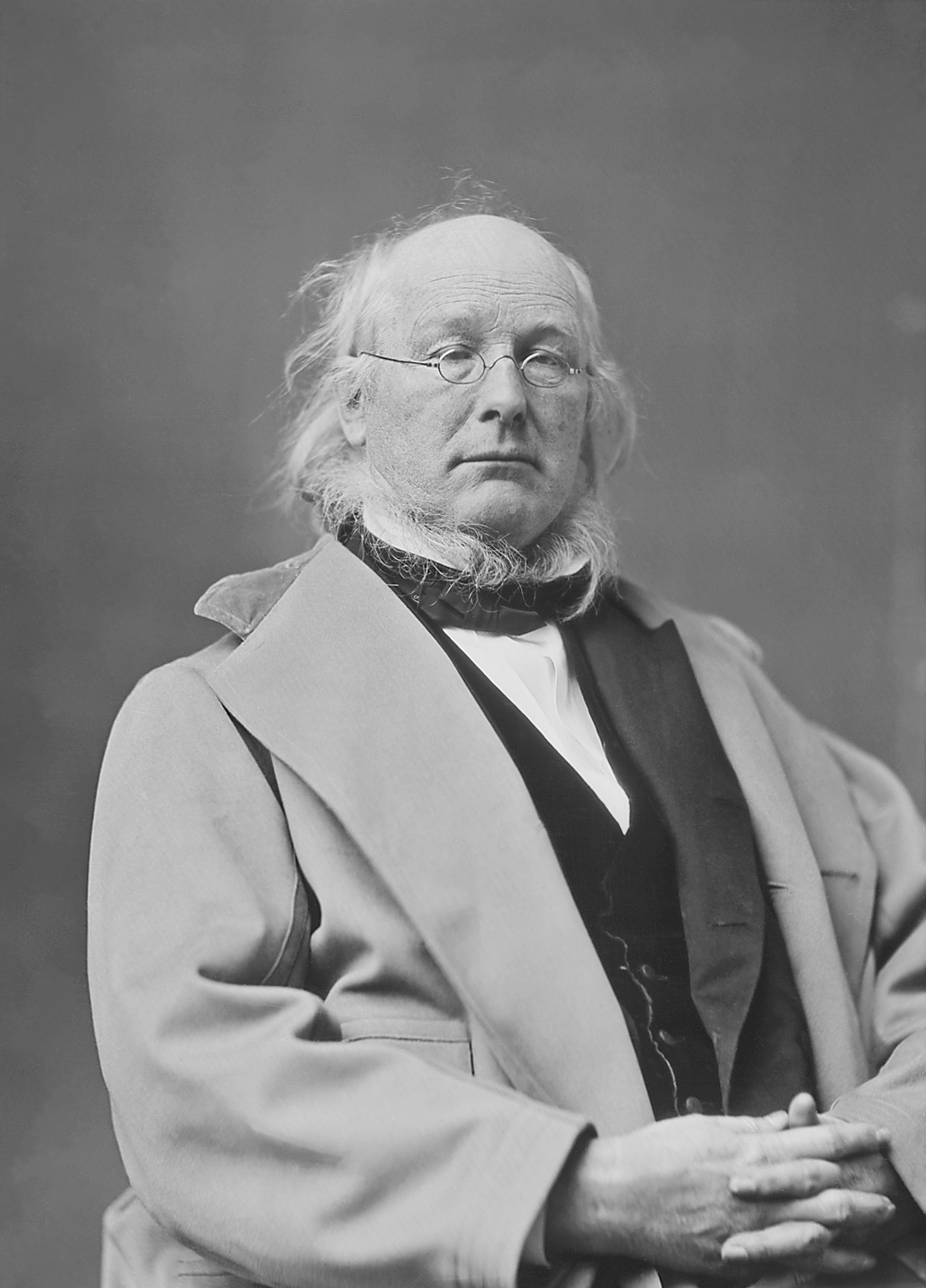
Whig journalist Horace Greeley

=== Whig thought ===
Historian Frank Towers writes that "Democrats stood for the 'sovereignty of the people' as expressed in popular demonstrations, constitutional conventions, and majority rule as a general principle of governing, whereas Whigs advocated the rule of law, written and unchanging constitutions, and protections for minority interests against majority tyranny." Historian Daniel Walker Howe argues the Whigs were modernizers, "who attached a great deal of importance to protecting property, maintaining social order, and preserving a distinct cultural heritage, three characteristic conservative concerns". The Whigs themselves adopted the word "conservative", which they associated with "'law and order', social caution, and moral restraint". Political scientists John H. Aldrich and John D. Griffin note that the labeling of Whig ideology as conservative is "somewhat [counterintuitive] for those who associate a small role for government rather than a pro-business orientation with conservatism". Others, like historian Joseph W. Pearson, note that the Whigs were "essentially middle class."

Historian John Ashworth writes that the two parties were polarized on essential questions of economic development, describing their competition as a "clash of democracy with capitalism". Whigs held that the government had a duty to promote economic prosperity for the people, especially during economic downturns. The Whigs further believed that individual regions of the country lacked the capital necessary for economic growth; thus, the federal government should subsidize large infrastructure projects and promote policies to facilitate the operations of banks and corporations.

Democrats, by contrast, argued that government action would inevitably favor the privileged few; thus, Democrats held that government should intervene in the economy as little as possible, especially at the federal level. Gregory Bowen notes that the two parties were polar opposite and highly ideological: "At the heart of Democratic ideology was a militant egalitarianism [for white men], which contrasted sharply with the Whigs' support for equality of opportunity to produce a meritocratic society." Democrats glorified individualism while Whigs said it was a dangerous impulse that must be subordinated to the greater good of an organic society; they called for individuals to restrain themselves and focus on doing their duty.

Howe characterizes the Whigs' anti-individualism as an "Aristotelian" desire to perfect human nature by subordinating animal impulses to reason and self-control. Historian John Burt expands on Howe's argument, noting that Whigs "saw unmediated expressions of popular will in roughly the same way as they saw unmediated compulsions of appetite ... [a]s a person driven by appetites is not free but the slave of the body, so a polity driven by popular will is not free but the slave of whatever urgencies drive King Numbers". The Whigs opposed President Jackson because they saw him as a demagogue recklessly exploiting the will of the majority, and they supported a strong Congress as a means of restraining that will within the bounds of a stable, constitutional framework.

Despite their differences, both parties sought to portray themselves as the true protectors of an American political tradition of equality and self-government. Though their Democratic rivals cast them as a continuation of the Federalists, the Whig Party's ideology was rooted in the agenda proposed by Clay and other nationalist Democratic-Republican Party leaders in the aftermath of the War of 1812. Many of these nationalist ideas were influenced by the economic program of Federalist leader Alexander Hamilton, but after the War of 1812, they were also supported by President James Madison, one of the founders of the Democratic-Republican Party.

Unlike their Democratic rivals, many Whigs held an aversion to party organizations that was rooted in the traditional American wariness of political parties. Whig opposition to parties waned after the 1830s, but many leading Whigs, including Webster and John Quincy Adams, never fully gave up their independence in favor of a party label. The Whigs were also deeply committed to preventing executive tyranny, which they saw as an existential threat to republican self-government.

Whig thought was typically rooted in evangelical Christianity, as expressed in the Second Great Awakening. Many Whigs would argue that the Bible was the best of Western civilization. Whigs linked moral progress and material progress—each needed the other. They supported Protestant religiosity and missions while being fearful of Catholics. Whigs believed that a higher stage of morality would be achieved when America brought wealth and opportunity to everyone. Whigs would then promote voluntary associations like churches, temperance societies, and schools. Participating in these kinds of societies made the Whigs think that people would become more virtuous. The Whigs believed the rapid business expansion was good with a focus on voluntary associations, not the moral danger Democrats warned about. This optimism for the future (when compared with the Democrat's pessimism, seeing the rising middle class as an affront to the traditional working-class man) is what the historian Joseph W. Pearson notes as the starting difference between both the Whigs' and the Democrats' economic views.

With this high degree of focus on voluntary associations, the Whigs would place a high degree of emphasis on public schooling. These public schools and Colleges would promote upward social mobility, discouraging immorality and dissipation. One Whig, Horace Mann, played a pivotal role in establishing a public school system in Massachusetts, and most states would emulate that.

=== Whig policies ===
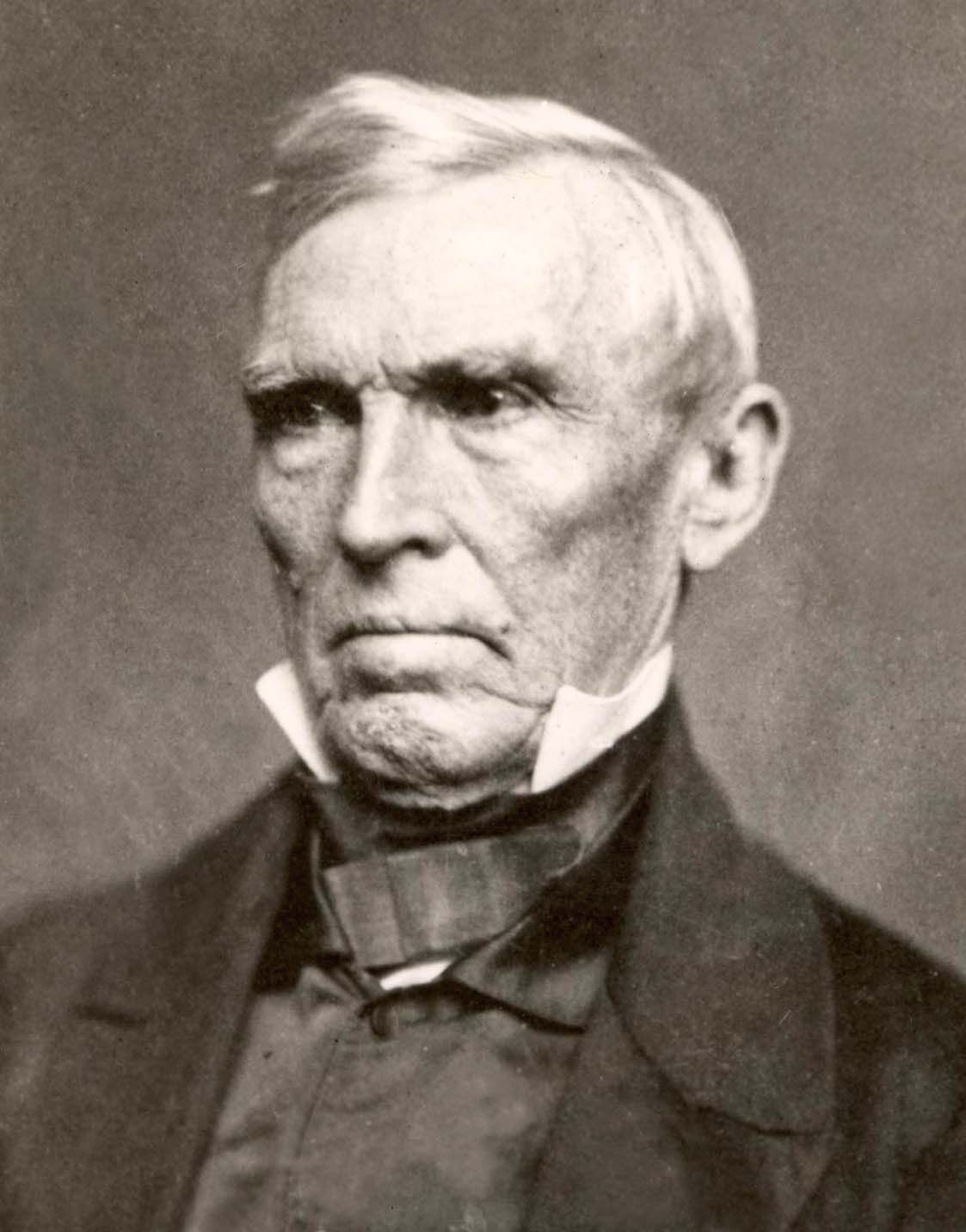
John J. Crittenden, an influential Whig leader who later established the short-lived Constitutional Union Party to contest the election of 1860

The Whigs celebrated Clay's vision of the American System, which promoted rapid economic and industrial growth in the United States through support for a national bank, high tariffs, a distribution policy, and federal funding for infrastructure projects. After the Second Bank of the United States lost its federal charter in 1836, the Whigs favored the restoration of a national bank that could provide a uniform currency, ensure a consistent supply of credit, and attract private investors. Through high tariffs, Clay and other Whigs hoped to generate revenue and encourage the establishment of domestic manufacturing, thereby freeing the United States from dependence on foreign imports.

High tariffs were also designed to prevent a negative balance of trade and stop the flow of currency and credit from the country. Whigs generally opposed Democratic efforts to reduce federal land prices, implement a "preemption" policy that would allow squatters the right to purchase land before it came to auction, and transfer ownership of western lands to the states. Instead, Whigs favored a "distribution" policy that would distribute revenues from federal land sales to the states; states could then invest that money in education, infrastructure projects, and other priorities. The Whigs supported federally financed internal improvements on the belief that only the federal government could construct the transportation system necessary for uniting the country commercially and culturally.

Aside from the Whig economic program, various other issues confronted the Whig Party. Temperance never became a purely partisan issue between Whigs and Democrats, but Whigs tended to be more favorable to state prohibition laws than were Democrats. Similarly, opinions on immigration did not break down strictly on party lines, but Whigs tended to have less favorable views towards immigration, partly because most recent immigrants aligned with the Democratic Party.

In the mid-1840s, a group of Whigs unsuccessfully pushed a bill that would have implemented new paperwork requirements for naturalization and monitored the movements of immigrants in the United States more closely. The unwillingness of Whig leaders to push for more far-reaching changes, such as an extension of the five-year naturalization period, encouraged some Whigs to join nativist third parties.

Whigs were less in favor of expansionism than their Democratic counterparts, and Whigs tended to oppose the Mexican–American War and the acquisition of new territories like Cuba. John Mack Faragher writes that Democrats sought to balance the rising power of industrialization in the United States by following "Thomas Jefferson's vision of establishing agriculture in the new territories", while Whigs were content to develop the country within its present borders and feared that expansion would cause a divisive debate over slavery in the territories.

== Base of support ==
U.S. presidential election results from 1828 to 1852. Darker shades of blue indicate states that generally voted for the Democratic Party, while darker shades of yellow/brown indicate states that generally voted for the Whig or National Republican Party.

Political scientist A. James Reichley writes that the Democrats and Whigs were "political institutions of a kind that had never existed before in history" because they commanded mass membership among voters and continued to function between elections. Both parties drew support from voters of various classes, occupations, religions, and ethnicities. Nonetheless, the Whig Party was based among middle-class conservatives. The central fault line between the parties concerned the emerging market economy, as Whigs embraced the economic and social changes caused by the market economy and Democrats rejected them.

Whigs drew strength from the economic elites in both Northern cities and Southern plantation regions, but they also attracted support from other classes in most cities. In many states, local rivalries pushed groups into one party or the other, though areas that favored internal improvements tended to favor Whigs. Catholics overwhelmingly voted Democrat, while Protestants were split between the two parties. Recent Irish and German immigrants generally supported the Democrats, but recent immigrants from England, Scotland, and Wales tended to support the Whigs.

Although the Whigs and the rival Democratic Party established party structures that were unprecedented in terms of mass membership and continued functionality, both parties were still essentially coalitions of state party organizations and lacked strong cohesion at the national level. The Whigs built on the strength of National Republicans and the Anti-Masonic Party to build up party organizations in Delaware, Maryland, and much of New England.

Appealing to voters with a mix of economic and social policies, the Whigs established capable party organizations in Northeastern states like New York and Pennsylvania. Unlike the Federalists and the National Republicans, the Whigs were competitive in the South, building strong state parties in Tennessee and Kentucky, and competitive parties in Louisiana, Georgia, and Virginia. By emphasizing their moral conservatism, the Whigs were also able to expand into the Northwest and win elections in states like Ohio and Indiana. The Whigs were generally not as competitive in Democratic strongholds like New Hampshire, Maine, Illinois, Alabama, Mississippi, Arkansas, Missouri, and Texas.

=== Party leaders ===
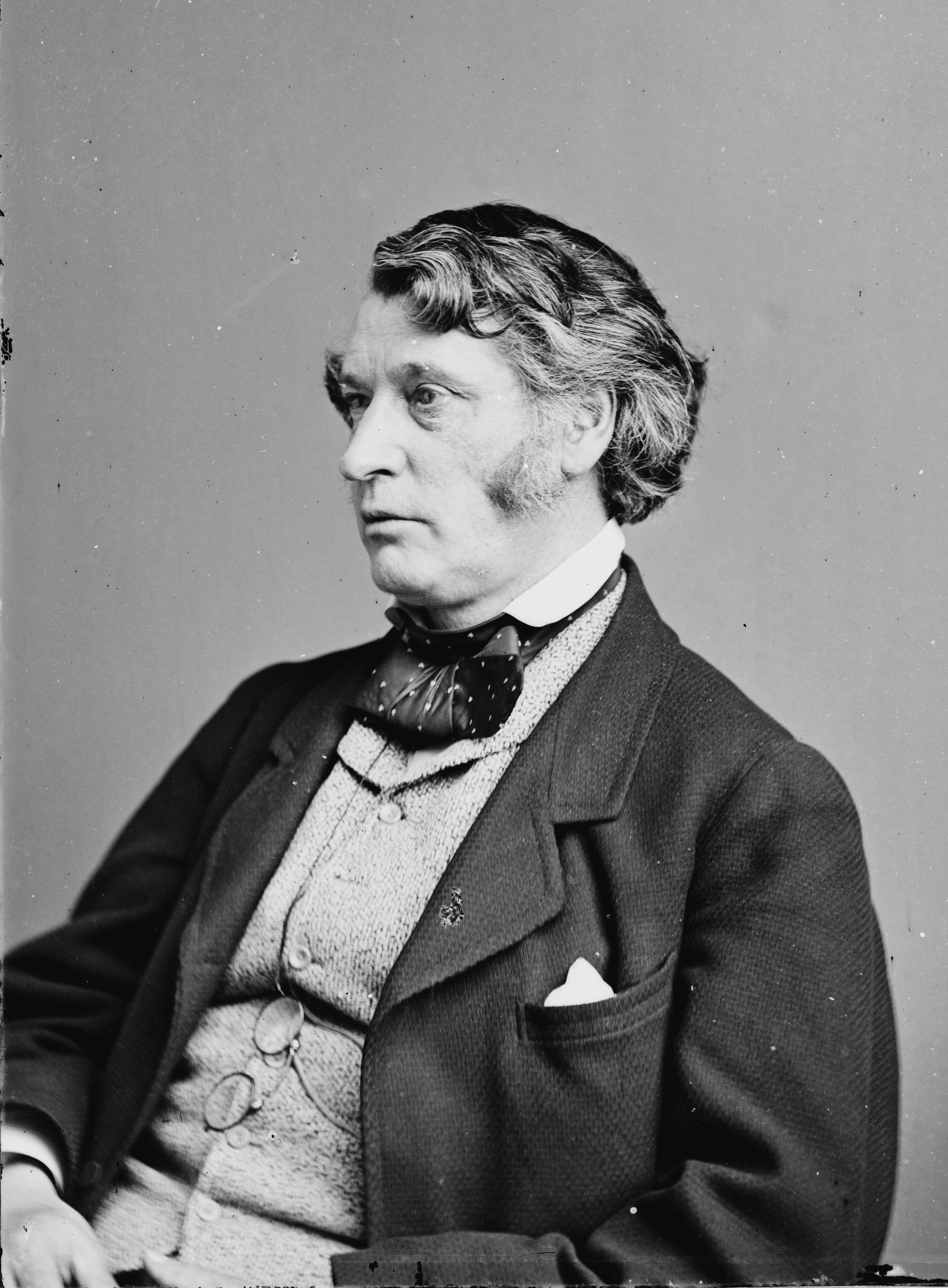
Charles Sumner, an anti-slavery "Conscience Whig" who later joined the Republican Party

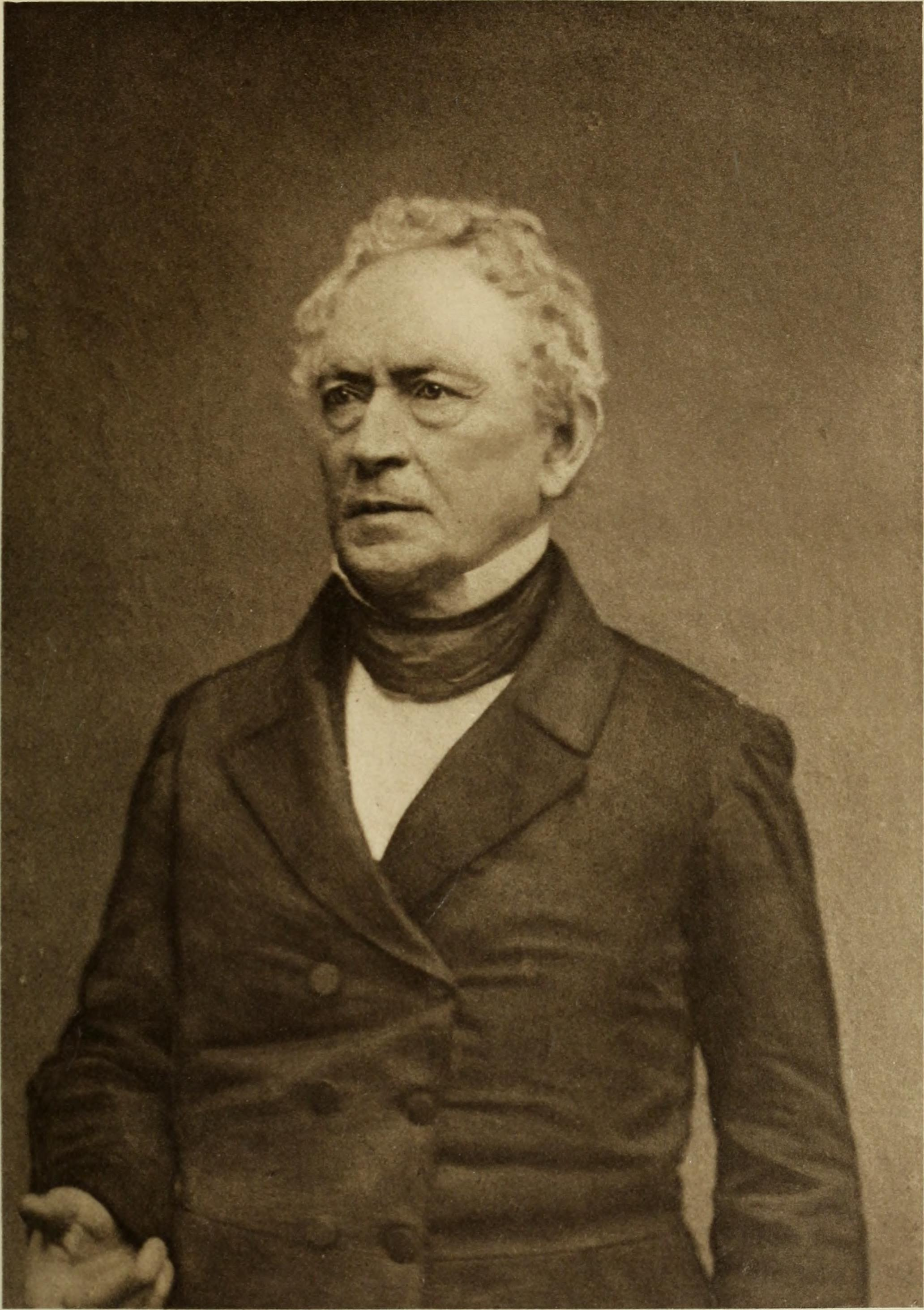
Edward Everett, a pro-South "Cotton Whig"

Henry Clay of Kentucky was the party's congressional leader from the time of its formation in 1833 until his resignation from the Senate in 1842, and he remained an important Whig leader until his death in 1852. His frequent rival for leadership of the party was Daniel Webster, who represented Massachusetts in the Senate and served as Secretary of State under three Whig presidents. Clay and Webster each repeatedly sought the Whig presidential nomination, but, excepting Clay's nomination in 1844, the Whigs consistently nominated individuals who had served as generals, specifically William Henry Harrison, Zachary Taylor, and Winfield Scott. Harrison, Taylor, John Tyler, and Millard Fillmore all served as president, though Tyler was expelled from the Whig Party shortly after taking office in 1841. Benjamin Robbins Curtis was the lone Whig to serve on the Supreme Court of the United States, though later Supreme Court justices like John Marshall Harlan affiliated with the Whig Party early in their career before joining the Court as members of another party.

During the time of the party's existence, numerous other Whig leaders emerged, including Truman Smith of Connecticut, whom Holt describes as "the Whigs' closest equivalent to a modern national party chairman" for his efforts to raise money, deliver the Whig message, and build up the party nationwide. In New York, William Seward and Thurlow Weed established an influential organization and competed with Millard Fillmore's faction of the party. John M. Clayton of Delaware and John C. Crittenden of Kentucky were important border state Whigs who were influential in the Taylor administration.

Supreme Court Justice John McLean of Ohio commanded a following in the party and was a perennial aspirant for the Whig presidential nomination, but he maintained his independence from the party and never ran for office as a Whig candidate. Thomas Corwin of Ohio emerged in the 1840s as a leading opponent of the Mexican–American War, and he later served as Fillmore's Secretary of the Treasury. William Cabell Rives of Virginia joined the Whig Party over dissatisfaction with Van Buren's handling of the Independent Treasury, and he became a prominent conservative Whig.

In Georgia, future Confederate Vice President Alexander H. Stephens and Robert Toombs competed for influence with their intra-party rival, John M. Berrien. Future Republican President Abraham Lincoln served a single term as a Whig congressman representing Illinois.

One strength of the Whigs was a superb network of newspapers—their leading editor was Horace Greeley of the powerful New-York Daily Tribune. The Boston Atlas, under the leadership of Richard Haughton and Richard Hildreth, also emerged as an important Whig paper. Influenced by the writings of Thomas Malthus and David Ricardo, Henry Charles Carey became the leading Whig economist in the 1830s. Other prominent Whig-aligned intellectuals and public figures include journalist John G. Palfrey of the North American Review, novelist John P. Kennedy, and historian William H. Prescott.

=== Factions ===
The Whigs suffered greatly from factionalism throughout their existence and weak party loyalty, which stood in contrast to the strong party discipline that was the hallmark of a tight Democratic Party organization. Forged out of opposition to Jackson's perceived executive tyranny, the early Whig Party was divided between former National Republicans who favored federal measures to promote economic development and Southern states' rights advocates who wished to keep federal intervention in the economy to a minimum. By the 1840s, Southern Whigs like John M. Berrien of Georgia and John Botts of Virginia endorsed interventionist measures, but other Southern Whigs like William Cabell Rives of Virginia actively sought to shift the party away from economic nationalism.

The Whig Party faced persistent sectional divisions regarding slavery. Northern Whigs tended to be more anti-slavery than Northern Democrats, but during the 1830s, Southern Whigs tended to be more pro-slavery than their Democratic counterparts. By the late 1840s, Southern Democrats had become more insistent regarding the expansion of slavery and more open to the prospect of secession than their Whig counterparts. Northern Whigs divided into two major factions concerning slavery: the anti-slavery Conscience Whigs and the pro-South Cotton Whigs. The "Consciences" were noted for their moral opposition to slavery — many, like John Quincy Adams, brought over their crusading fervor from their Anti-Masonic days.

The other faction was tied to the cotton-based textile industry, which depended on Southern cotton. They de-emphasized the slavery issue. In Massachusetts, notable Consciences included Charles Sumner, Henry Wilson and Charles Francis Adams while the Cottons were led by such figures as Edward Everett, Robert C. Winthrop and Abbott Lawrence. During the mid-1850s, several Conscience leaders played an important role in the founding of the Republican Party.

== Legacy ==
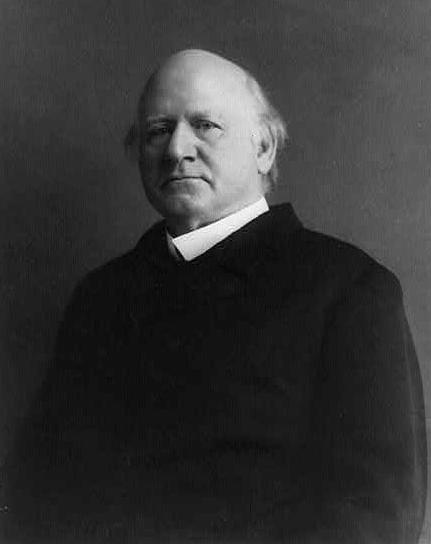
John Marshall Harlan, who began his career as a Whig officeholder, served on the Supreme Court from 1877 to 1911.

=== Historical reputation ===
Historian Allen C. Guelzo writes that "no major political movement ... has suffered more sheer dismissal, more impatient contempt at the hands of political historians than the American Whigs". Guelzo traces the start of this "dismissal" to the writings of Henry Adams, who dismissed the Whigs as bereft of ideas, and through to the writings of historian Arthur M. Schlesinger Jr., who labeled the period during which the Whigs were active as the "Age of Jackson". The Whigs' historical reputation began to recover with the publication of The Political Culture of the American Whigs by historian Daniel Walker Howe in 1979. Rather than accepting the traditional understanding of the Whigs as Eastern elitists who sought to exploit the masses, Howe cast the Whigs as "sober, industrious, thrifty people" who sought to promote industrialization and national unity.

In today's American political discourse, historians and pundits often cite the Whig Party as an example of a political party that lost its followers and reason for being, as in the expression "going the way of the Whigs", a term referred to by Donald Critchlow in his book, The Conservative Ascendancy: How the GOP Right Made Political History. Critchlow points out that the application of the term by Republicans in the Republican Party of 1974 may have been a misnomer—the old Whig party enjoyed more political support before its demise than the Republican Party in the aftermath of Nixon's resignation.

=== Namesakes ===
After the dissolution of the Whig Party, the term Whig remained part of the name of various newspapers, including the Quincy Herald-Whig. Several ephemeral small parties in the United States, including the Florida Whig Party and the "Modern Whig Party", have adopted the Whig name. In Liberia, the True Whig Party was named in direct emulation of the American Whig Party. The True Whig Party was founded in 1869 and dominated politics in Liberia from 1878 until 1980.

=== In popular culture ===
Two alternative history works depicting histories where the Confederacy won the American Civil War include a Whig Party having a major role in the postbellum world. In Ward Moore's Bring the Jubilee, a revived Whig Party is one of the two main parties of the rump United States, being the right-wing party whose platform reflects an acceptance of the United States' humbled status following its defeat in the War of Southern Independence. Conversely, in Harry Turtledove's Southern Victory Series a Whig Party emerges as the dominant political party of an independent Confederacy, representing the interests of the plantocratic elite and dominating Confederate politics until the rise of the Freedom Party following the First Great War.

== Electoral history ==
=== Presidential tickets ===
Election	Ticket		Electoral results		
Election	Presidential nominee	Running mate	Popular vote	Electoral votes	Ranking
1836	William Henry Harrison	Francis Granger	36.6%	73 / 294	2
1836	Hugh Lawson White	John Tyler	9.7%	26 / 294	3
1836	Daniel Webster	Francis Granger	2.7%	14 / 294	4
1836	Willie Person Mangum	John Tyler	0%	11 / 294	5
1840	William Henry Harrison	John Tyler	52.9%	234 / 294	1
1844	Henry Clay	Theodore Frelinghuysen	48.1%	105 / 275	2
1848	Zachary Taylor	Millard Fillmore	47.3%	163 / 290	1
1852	Winfield Scott	William Alexander Graham	43.9%	42 / 296	2
1856	Millard Fillmore (Note: Fillmore and Donelson ran on the American Party ticket in the 1856 United States presidential election, though they were also nominated by a rump group of Whigs at the 1856 Whig National Convention.)	Andrew Jackson Donelson	21.5%	8 / 296	3

=== Congressional representation ===
Congress	Years	Senate					House of Representatives					President
Congress	Years	Total	Democrats	Whigs	Others	Vacancies	Total	Democrats	Whigs	Others	Vacancies	President
25th	1837–1839	52	35	17	—	—	242	128	100	14	—	Martin Van Buren
26th	1839–1841	52	30	22	—	—	242	125	109	8	—	Martin Van Buren
27th	1841–1843	52	22	29	—	1	242	98	142	2	—	John Tyler (Note: Whig President William Henry Harrison died April 4, 1841, one month into his term, and was succeeded by John Tyler, who served for the remainder of the term. Tyler had been elected as vice president on the Whig ticket, but he became an independent after the Whigs expelled him from the party in 1841.)
28th	1843–1845	52	23	29	—	—	223	147	72	4	—	John Tyler
29th	1845–1847	58	34	22	—	2	228	142	79	7	—	James K. Polk
30th	1847–1849	60	38	21	1	—	230	110	116	4	—	James K. Polk
31st	1849–1851	62	35	25	2	—	233	113	108	11	1	Zachary Taylor (Note: President Taylor died July 9, 1850, about one year and four months into the term, and was succeeded by Millard Fillmore, who served for the remainder of the term.)
32nd	1851–1853	62	36	23	3	—	233	127	85	21	—	Millard Fillmore
33rd	1853–1855	62	38	22	2	—	234	157	71	6	—	Franklin Pierce
Congress	Years	Total	Democrats	Opposition	Others	Vacancies	Total	Democrats	Opposition	Others	Vacancies	President
34th	1855–1857	62	39	21	2	—	234	83	100	51	—	Franklin Pierce

== See also ==
- Second Party System
- American election campaigns in the 19th century
- List of political parties in the United States
- Political history in the United States
- Whig (British political faction)
