= Donald T. Critchlow =

American historian (born 1948)

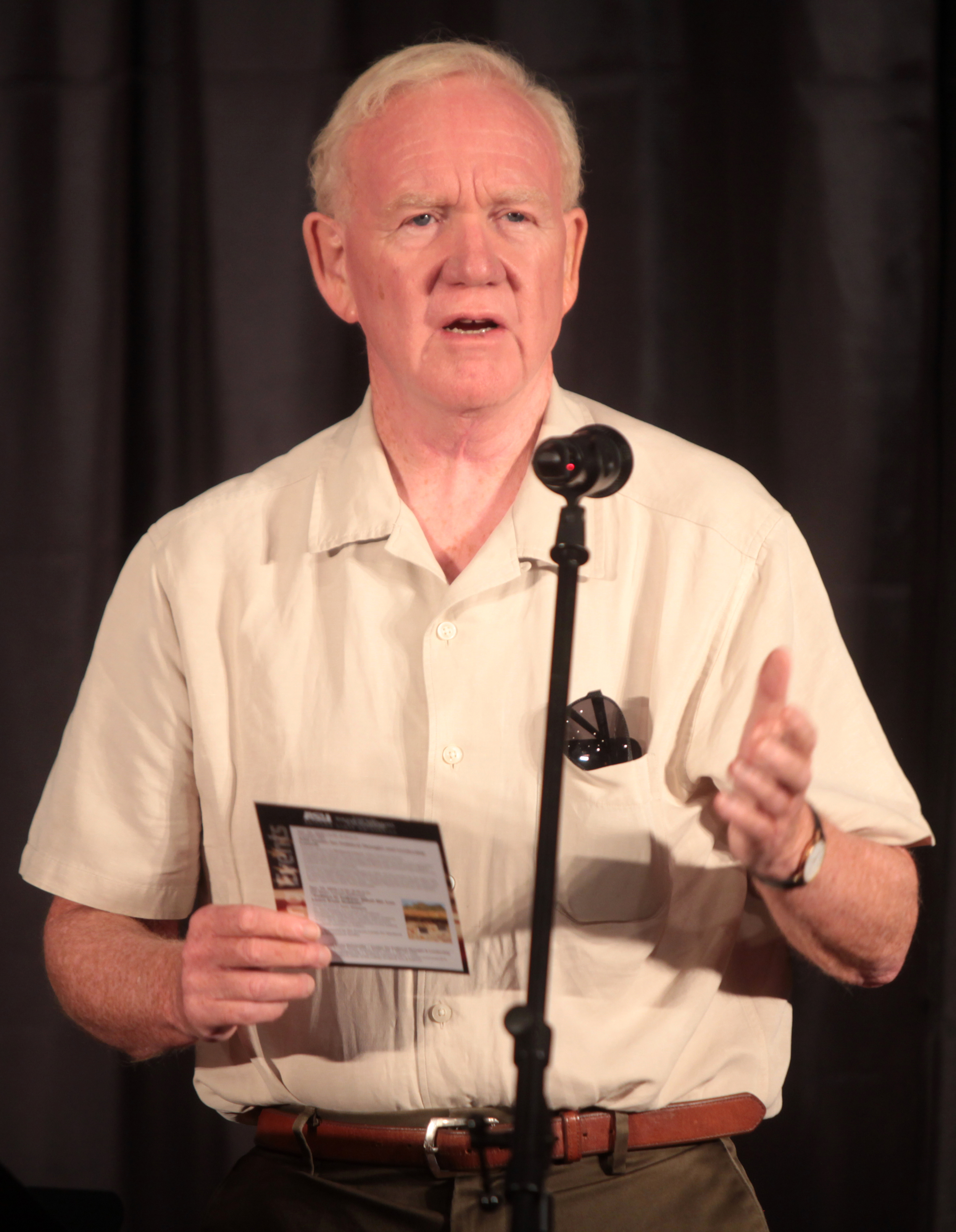
- Critchlow in 2015.
- Born: Donald Thomas Critchlow; May 18, 1948 (age 78); Pasadena, Los Angeles County, California, United States
- Education: San Francisco State University; University of California, Berkeley (MA, PhD)
- Occupation: Historian
- Title: University professor
- Political party: Republican
- Spouse: Patricia Powers Critchlow
- Children: 2

Donald Thomas Critchlow (born May 18, 1948) serves as Director for the Center for American Institutions at Arizona State University, where he is a professor in history. The Center for American Institutions, established in Fall 2023, states as its mission to strengthen and renew American institutions, political, economic, and social. He has appeared on C-SPAN, NPR, BBC World News, and many talk radio programs. He has written for The Washington Post, The New York Observer, New York Post, NewsMax and National Review, and has lectured in Europe, China, and Brazil.

He serves also as the editor-in-chief of the Journal of Policy History published by Cambridge University Press.

== Biography ==
=== Early life ===
Donald Thomas Critchlow was born on May 18, 1948, in Pasadena, California. He was educated at Maryville High School in Phoenix, Arizona. He graduated from San Francisco State University in 1968 and received his M.A. (1972) and Ph.D. (1978) from the University of California, Berkeley.

=== Career ===
He was an associate professor of history at the University of Notre Dame, before moving to Saint Louis University in St. Louis, Missouri, as a professor of history. In the fall of 2010, he accepted a professorship in history at Arizona State University and in 2016 he was named Katzin Family Professor. He serves as lead for the undergraduate certificate Program in Political History and Leadership at Arizona State University.

He is founding president on the Institute for Political History, a non-profit education foundation that sponsors the Policy History Conference, graduate travel awards, and other academic and historical projects.

He has also been a visiting professor at University of Hong Kong (1997–98) and University of Warsaw in Poland (1988–89). In addition he has been a guest scholar at the Brookings Institution, a fellow at the Woodrow Wilson International Center for Scholars, and a fellow at the Center for Philosophy and Politics. He has lectured throughout Europe and China as a State Department distinguished lecturer and as a Fulbright scholar.

His most recent books include "Revolutionary Monsters: How Five Men Turned Liberation to Tyranny," (Regnery Publishers, 2021)"In Defense of Populism" (University of Pennsylvania Pr., 2020) "Republican Character: From Nixon to Reagan" (University of Pennsylvania Pr, 2018), "Future Right: The Forging of a New Republican Majority(St. Martin's Press, 2016), American Political History: A Very Short Introduction (Oxford University Press, 2015) "When Hollywood Was Right: How Movie Starts, Movie Moguls and Big Business Remade American Politics" Cambridge University Press, 2013) The Conservative Ascendancy" (Harvard University Press, 2007; "Phyllis Schlafly and Grassroots Conservatism" (Princeton University Press, 2005), and "Intended Consequences: Birth Control, Abortion and the Federal Government in Modern America" (Oxford University Press, 1999). He is co-editor with Paula Baker of The Oxford Handbook of American Political History, co-authored a textbook on American history with Paula Baker and W. J. Rorabaugh, and edited a five-volume history of the United States published in Warsaw, Poland. In 1987, he co-founded the quarterly interdisciplinary Journal of Policy History. Published by Cambridge University Press, the Journal has published many prize-winning essays and sponsors an interdisciplinary conference.

=== Personal life ===
He is married to Patricia Powers Critchlow, and they have two daughters, Agnieszka Critchlow and Magda Critchlow.

== Bibliography ==
- The Brookings Institution: 1916–1952: Expertise in a Democratic Society (DeKalb, Illinois: Northern Illinois Press, 1984)
- Studebaker: The Life and Death of an American Corporation (Bloomington, Indiana: Indiana University Press, 1996)
- Intended Consequences: Birth Control, Abortion, and the Federal Government in Modern America (New York: Oxford University Press, 1999)
- Phyllis Schlafly and Grassroots Conservatism: A Woman's Crusade (Princeton, New Jersey: Princeton University Press, 2005)
- The Conservative Ascendancy: How the GOP Right Made Political History (Cambridge, Massachusetts: Harvard University Press, 2007; Expanded and Revised edition, Lawrence, Kansas: University Press of Kansas, 2011)
- Debating the Conservative Movement: 1945 to the Present (co-authored with Nancy MacLean) (Lantham, Maryland: Rowman and Littfield Publishers, 2009)
- When Hollywood Was Right: How Movie Stars, Studio Moguls, and Big Business Changed American Politics (New York: Cambridge University Press, 2013)
- American Political History: A Very Short Introduction (New York: Oxford University Press, 2015)
- Future Right: Forging a New Republican Majority (New York: St. Martin's Press, 2016)
- Republican Character: From Reagan to Nixon (Philadelphia: University of Pennsylvania Press, 2018)
- In Defense of Populism: Protest and American Democracy (Philadelphia: University of Pennsylvania Press, 2020)
- Revolutionary Monsters: Five Men Who Turned Liberation into Tyranny (Regnery, 2021)
