= National Register of Historic Places listings in Limestone County, Alabama =

Location of Limestone County in Alabama

This is a list of the National Register of Historic Places listings in Limestone County, Alabama.

This is intended to be a complete list of the properties and districts on the National Register of Historic Places in Limestone County, Alabama, United States. Latitude and longitude coordinates are provided for many National Register properties and districts; these locations may be seen together in a Google map.

There are 13 properties and districts listed on the National Register in the county.

This National Park Service list is complete through NPS recent listings posted January 16, 2026.

== Current listings ==
	Name on the Register	Image	Date listed	Location	City or town	Description
1	Athens Courthouse Square Commercial Historic District	Athens Courthouse Square Commercial Historic District	October 10, 1997 (#97001164)	Roughly bounded by Clinton, Hobbs, Madison, and Green Sts. 34°48′10″N 86°58′16″W	Athens	
2	Athens State College Historic District	Athens State College Historic District	February 14, 1985 (#85000254)	202-212 and 311 N. Beaty St., central Athens State University campus area roughly bounded by Beaty, Pryor, and Hobbs Sts. 34°48′20″N 86°58′00″W	Athens	
3	Belle Mina	Belle Mina	October 31, 1972 (#72000164)	South of Belle Mina on the Mooresville-Elkton Rd. 34°38′41″N 86°52′49″W	Belle Mina	
4	Blackburn House		September 20, 1984 (#84000643)	West of Athens; 34°47′32″N 87°03′16″W	Athens	
5	Cotton Hill		December 10, 2014 (#14001003)	23789 Huntsville-Brownsferry Rd., E. 34°43′49″N 86°53′51″W	Athens	
6	Robert Donnell House	Robert Donnell House	September 19, 1973 (#73000354)	601 S. Clinton St. 34°47′46″N 86°58′05″W	Athens	
7	George S. Houston Historic District	George S. Houston Historic District	July 20, 1989 (#89000943)	Roughly 2nd Ave., Jefferson St., McClellan St., Marion St., Hobbs St., Madison St., Washington St., and Houston St. 34°48′23″N 86°58′22″W	Athens	
8	Governor George Smith Houston House	Governor George Smith Houston House	May 15, 1986 (#86001043)	101 N. Houston St. 34°48′13″N 86°58′29″W	Athens	
9	Mooresville	Mooresville	April 13, 1972 (#72000165)	Off Interstate 565 (also U.S. Route 72 Alternate and State Route 20); 34°37′26″N 86°52′39″W	Mooresville	
10	Old Athens, Alabama Main Post Office	Old Athens, Alabama Main Post Office	February 18, 1982 (#82002047)	310 W. Washington St. 34°48′10″N 86°58′23″W	Athens	
11	Robert Beaty Historic District	Robert Beaty Historic District	August 30, 1984 (#84000646)	Roughly bounded by the former Louisville and Nashville railroad line and Forrest, East, and Washington Sts. 34°48′01″N 86°58′01″W	Athens	
12	Sulphur Trestle Fort Site	Sulphur Trestle Fort Site	May 8, 1973 (#73000355)	1 mile (1.6 km) south of Elkmont; 34°54′40″N 86°58′13″W	Elkmont	Boundary increase July 21, 2015
13	Woodside	Woodside	February 19, 1982 (#82002048)	Southwest of Belle Mina; 34°39′06″N 86°52′24″W	Belle Mina	Destroyed by fire in November 2022.

== Former listings ==
	Name on the Register	Image	Date listed	Date removed	Location	City or town	Description
1	Cave Place		February 19, 1982 (#82002049)	December 7, 1989	AL 20	Mooresville vicinity	

== See also ==
- List of National Historic Landmarks in Alabama
- National Register of Historic Places listings in Alabama
