= Athens Historic District =

Athens Historic District may refer to:

- Athens Courthouse Square Commercial Historic District, Athens, Alabama, listed on the National Register of Historic Places in Limestone County, Alabama
- Athens State College Historic District, Athens, Alabama, listed on the National Register of Historic Places in Limestone County, Alabama
- Athens Warehouse Historic District, Athens, Georgia, listed on the National Register of Historic Places in Clarke County, Georgia
- Downtown Athens Historic District, Athens, Georgia, listed on the National Register of Historic Places in Clarke County, Georgia
- Athens-Candler-Church Street Historic District, Winder, Georgia, listed on the National Register of Historic Places in Barrow County, Georgia
- Athens Historic District (Athens, Kentucky), listed on the National Register of Historic Places in Fayette County, Kentucky
- Athens Lower Village Historic District, Athens, New York, listed on the National Register of Historic Places in Greene County, New York
- Athens Downtown Historic District, Athens, Ohio, listed on the NRHP in Athens County, Ohio
- Athens Historic District (Athens, Pennsylvania), listed on the National Register of Historic Places in Bradford County, Pennsylvania
