= Woodside (Belle Mina, Alabama) =

Historic house in Alabama, United States

- U.S. National Register of Historic Places
- Alabama Register of Landmarks and Heritage
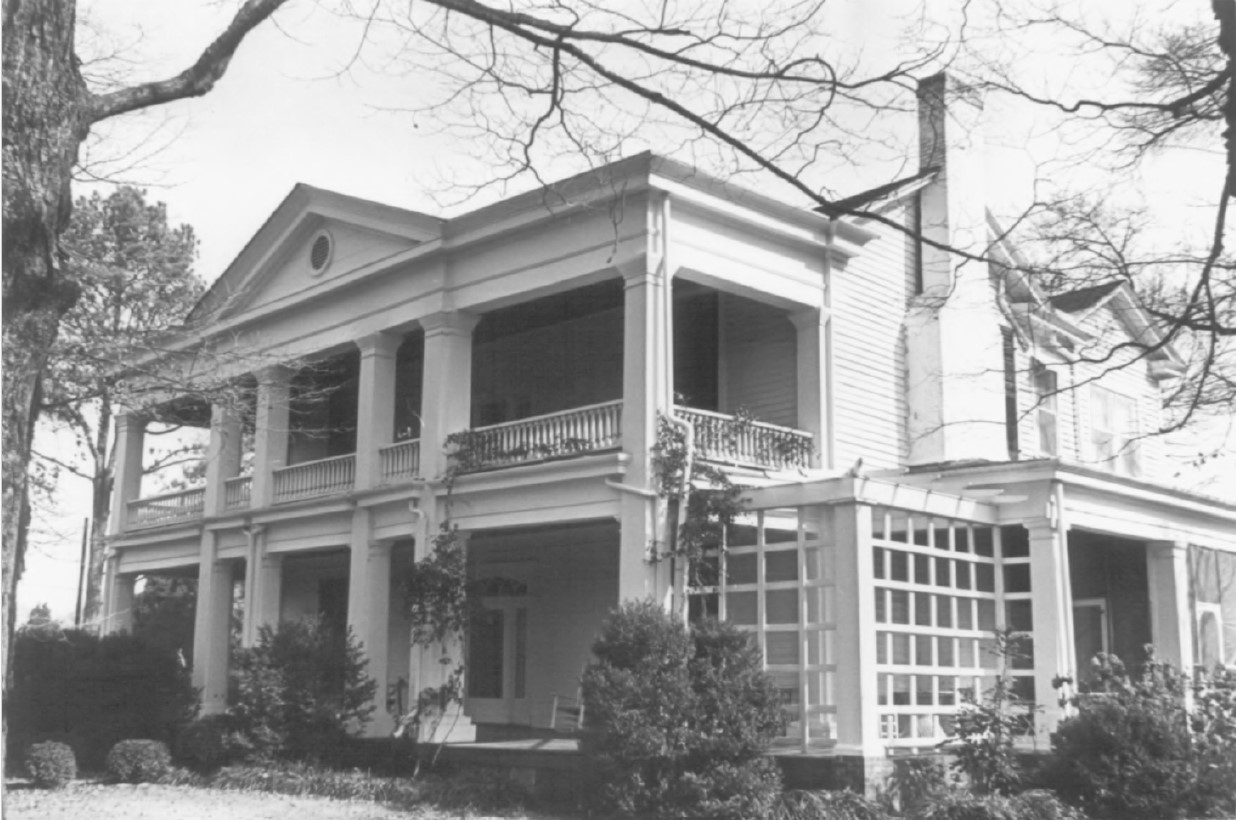
- Woodside in 1981

- Location within Alabama Location within the United States
- Nearest city: Belle Mina, Alabama
- Coordinates: 34°39′6″N 86°52′24″W
- Area: 18.5 acres (7.5 ha)
- Built: 1861
- Architectural style: Greek Revival
- NRHP reference No.: 82002048

Significant dates
- Added to NRHP: February 19, 1982
- Designated ARLH: October 19, 1979

Woodside was a historic residence in Belle Mina, Alabama. The land on which the house was built was originally part of Alabama Governor Thomas Bibb's estate, Belle Mina. Thomas' son, Porter Bibb, built Woodside in 1861 for his daughter, Mary Chambers Bibb. The two houses stood one-half mile (1 km) apart. Woodside was a two-story Greek Revival house, originally with a central, double-height portico that was extended to the full width of the façade in the early 1900s. The house has a center-hall plan, with two rooms on either side of a hallway on both floors. The rear of the house was originally a pair of one-story wings, but a second story was added in an early 20th-century renovation. Greek Revival details continued inside the house, such as mantels and architrave-framed panels in the stairwell. The house was listed on the National Register of Historic Places in 1982. Woodside was destroyed by a fire in late November 2022.
