= Senator Bibb =

Senator Bibb may refer to:

- George M. Bibb (1776–1859), U.S. Senator from Kentucky from 1829 to 1835
- Thomas Bibb (1783–1839), member of the Alabama State Senate from 1819 to 1820
- William Wyatt Bibb (1781–1820), U.S. Senator from Georgia from 1813 to 1816
