= Julia Pleasants Creswell =

American poet and novelist (1827–1886)

- Born: Julia Pamelia Pleasants; August 21, 1827; Huntsville, Alabama, U.S.
- Died: June 9, 1886 (aged 58)
- Occupation: Writer
- Spouse: David Creswell (m. 1854)
- Children: 8
- Parent: James J. Pleasants
- Relatives: Thomas Bibb (grandfather); John Hampden Pleasants; James Pleasants; William Wyatt Bibb
- Writing career
- Pen name: Adrienne; Amelia
- Genres: poetry; novels

Julia Pleasants Creswell (née Julia Pamelia Pleasants; pen names, Adrienne and Amelia; August 21, 1827 – June 9, 1886) was a poet and novelist of Southern United States literature who lived in Alabama and Louisiana. She was author of Aphelia, and Other Poems by Two Cousins of the South, in conjunction with Thomas M. Bibb Bradley, of Huntsville, published in 1854; Poems; Callamura, an allegorical novel, published 1868; posthumous volume of poems; Abracadabra, a novel which was never published; and a book of short poems which she had ready for publication but never published, dedicated to George D. Prentice in appreciation of his devotion to Southern literature.

== Early life and education ==
Julia Pamelia Pleasants was born in Huntsville, Alabama, August 21, 1827. Her parents were Col. James Jay, a commission merchant, and a native of Hanover County, Virginia, and Emily Julia (Bibb) Pleasants. Her father belonged to the Pleasants family, of Virginia, which contributed several distinguished names to the history of that State. John Hampden Pleasants, of Richmond fell in the Ritchie duel. James Pleasants was the 22nd Governor of Virginia; and there was also Hugh Rose Pleasants (1809-1870).

The Pleasants were from Norfolk, an old family of England. John Pleasants emigrated to the United States in the year 1665 and settled in Henrico County. He left two sons: the younger inherited the estate called Pickernockie, later owned by Boyd and Edmond, on the Chickahominy River. From this, his descendants were called "Pickanockies". From this younger branch of the family came the aforementioned names. Tarleton Pleasants, Julia's grandfather, was highly educated. He was ninety-four years old when he died. His means were limited, and Julia's father left his home in Hanover county at the age of sixteen to seek his own fortunes. He worked awhile in Virginia as printer's boy, and then as sub-editor. The Alabama Territory was then attracting new settlers, and he went there, landing at Huntsville, one of the earliest to do so. His manners won him popularity, and he was elected to the office of secretary of state (1822-1824), Thomas Bibb being at that time the second Governor of Alabama. Mr. Pleasants married the second daughter of Thomas Bibb.

Gov. Thomas and Pamelia (Thompson) Bibb lived at Belle Mina homestead, near Huntsville, the former of whom having succeeded his brother, William, who was the first governor of the state.

Julia was the second child of the marriage. Soon after his marriage, Mr. Pleasants abandoned politics, and engaged in mercantile life. Ex-Governor Bibb owned immense estates, and Julia was, so to speak, reared in luxury. Mr. Pleasants wrote with ease and facility, and he fostered Julia's fondness for fashioning her thoughts in rhyme. He was especially eager to secure to his children all the advantages of which, in some measure, his own youth had been deprived; and Julia was indeed fortunate in having for eight years the instruction of a very knowledgeable teacher, Miss Swift from Middleton, Vermont. Reared and educated in Huntsville, Julia graduated from a young ladies' seminary at that place.

Julia was orphaned by the simultaneous death of her parents, after which she resided several years with her grandmother, Pamelia Thompson Bibb. Here, Julia's sister, Addie, died.

== Career ==
Creswell contributed many poems to various periodicals. George D. Prentice, of the Louisville Journal, was receiving poetic contributions from a number of young women writers of merit, whom he termed his "staff of young lady poets". Among these was "Amelia", who, under his kindly criticism and fostering poetic care, became famous. Julia (using the pseudonym "Amelia"), then in her teens, and residing in Huntsville, was a leading favorite of his, and she contributed the poem, "The Youthful Pilot", written on the death of Robert A. Whyte. Prentice, in his editorial comment on publishing it, remarked that "one might not unwillingly contract to die on stipulation of such a poem in memoriam".

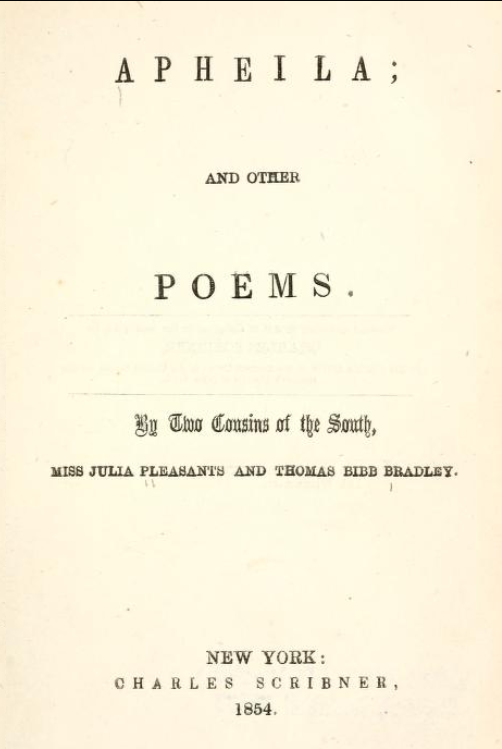
Apheila

Creswell's cousin, Thomas Bibb Bradley (1829-1855), a poet of promise, who died soon afterward, induced her to publish a selection of her poems with some of his own. The volume appeared in 1854, before her marriage, under the title Apheila, and other Poems, by two Cousins of the South (New York City, 1854).

In 1854, she married Judge David Creswell, a native of South Carolina and a district judge of Alabama. They lived in Mansfield, Louisiana, until the end of the civil war, where Judge Creswell was a wealthy planter. At the end of the war, he lost his wealth and they moved to Shreveport, Louisiana where he resumed the practice of the law. She taught for one term in a young ladies' seminary at Shreveport. Later, she conducted a private school in her home for two terms.

She published an allegorical novel entitled Callamura (Philadelphia, 1868), and left many unpublished poems to be issued in a posthumous volume.

== Personal life and death ==
On October 11, 1854, at Huntsville, she married David Cresswell, son of Robert and Mary (Davis) Cresswell, who lived at Eutaw, Alabama, the former a lawyer, whose father, a Presbyterian minister, came from Ireland. Mr. Cresswell was a graduate of Columbia Law School, South Carolina, was a district judge before the civil war, and a parish judge for eighteen years after the war. He died September, 1876. Before his marriage to Julia Pleasants, he had been married to Gertrude Thornton, by whom he had one son, Harry Thornton Cresswell, a lawyer, of San Francisco, California.

Julia and David had eight children: David Lewis, Steins, New Mexico; Adrienne, San Diego, California; Robert Paul, Tornillo, Texas; James Pleasants, Shreveport, Louisiana; Sydmore; Kenneth; Julien; Frank Lyon, Steins, New Mexico. The only daughter, Adrienne, (the nom de plume under which Creswell first published) inherited her mother's poetic temperament, dabbling in rhymes from the age of ten.

"Greenwood", the Creswell's home, was near Shreveport where she was a member of the Cumberland Presbyterian Church.

By the 1880s, Creswell had been committed to the State Lunatic Asylum (now, East Louisiana State Hospital), Jackson, Louisiana. She died there, June 9, 1886.

== Selected works ==
=== Novels ===
- Callamura, 1868

=== Poetry collections ===
- Apheila, and other Poems, by two Cousins of the South (with Thomas M. Bibb Bradley), 1854
- Poems
- a posthumous volume of poems

=== Unpublished ===
- Abracadabra (novel)
- book of short poems dedicated to George D. Prentice
