= Governor Bibb =

Governor Bibb may refer to:

- Thomas Bibb (1783–1839), 2nd Governor of Alabama
- William Wyatt Bibb (1781–1820), 1st Governor of Alabama
