= 1823 Alabama gubernatorial election =

- August 4, 1823
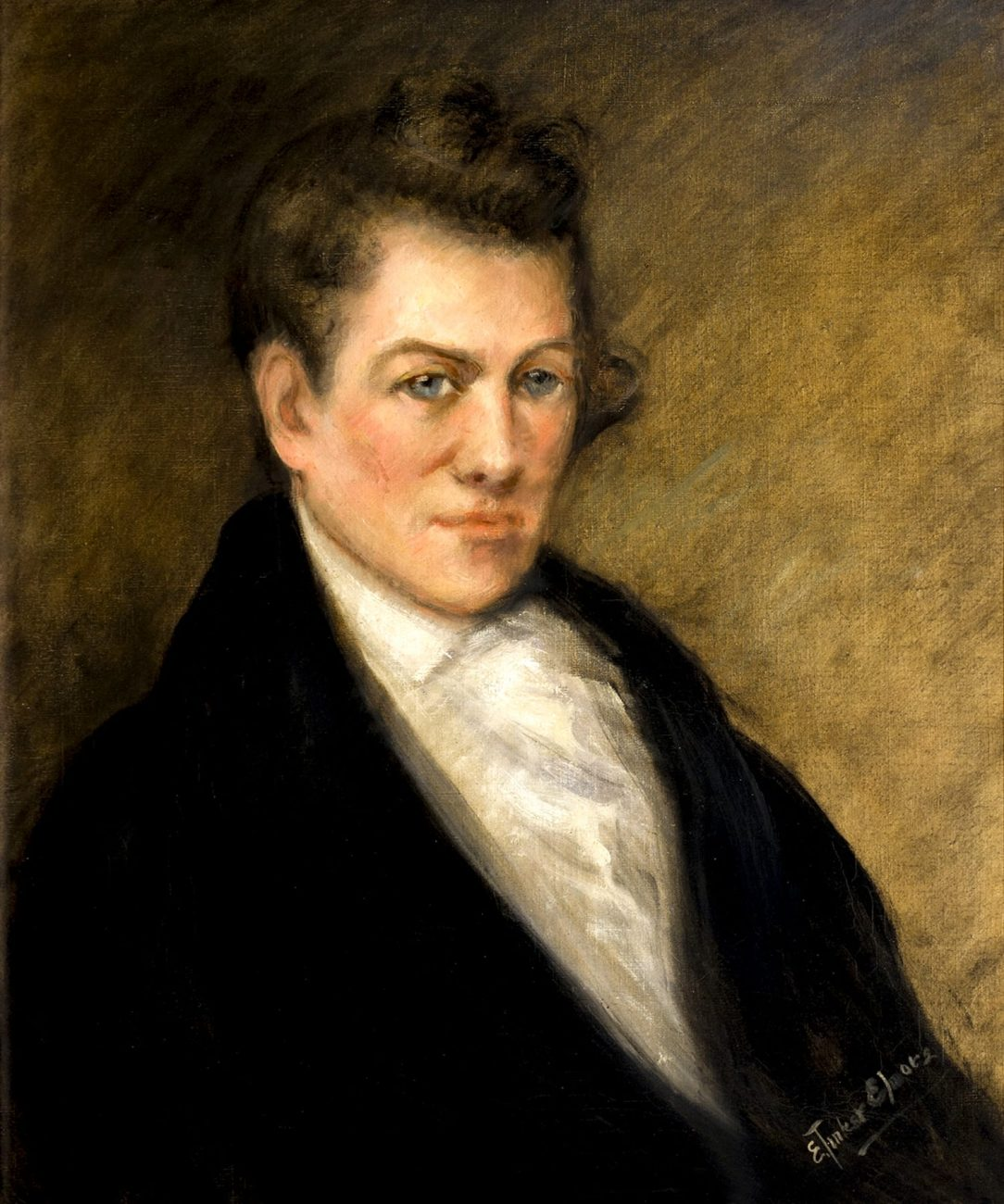

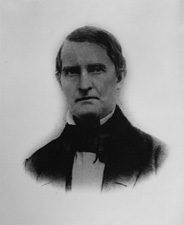
| Nominee | Israel Pickens | Henry H. Chambers |
| Party | Democratic-Republican | Democratic-Republican |
| Popular vote | 13,069 | 10,331 |
| Percentage | 55.85% | 44.15% |
- County results Pickens: 50–60% 60–70% 70–80% 80–90% >90% Chambers: 50–60% 60–70% 70–80% 80–90% Unknown/No Vote
Governor before election
Israel Pickens
Democratic-Republican
Elected Governor
Israel Pickens
National Republican

The 1823 Alabama gubernatorial election was held on August 4, 1823, to elect the governor of Alabama. Democratic-Republican incumbent Israel Pickens defeated fellow Democratic-Republican Henry H. Chambers with 55.85% of the vote. Pickens and Chambers had both contested the 1821 election as Democratic-Republicans as well.

== General election ==
=== Candidates ===
- Israel Pickens, Alabama governor since 1821, US Representative for North Carolina 1811–1817
- Henry H. Chambers, Delegate to the Alabama Constitutional Convention and Alabama House member in 1820

=== Results ===
1823 Alabama gubernatorial election
| Party | Candidate | Votes | % | ±% |
|---|---|---|---|---|
| Democratic-Republican | Israel Pickens (incumbent) | 13,069 | 55.85% | −1.58% |
| Democratic-Republican | Henry H. Chambers | 10,331 | 44.15% | +1.58% |
| Total votes | | 23,400 | 100% | N/A |
| Democratic-Republican hold | | | | |

==== By county ====
County results
| County | Israel Pickens Democratic-Republican | | Henry H. Chambers Democratic-Republican | | Total votes |
| County | # | % | # | % | Total votes |
|---|---|---|---|---|---|
| Autauga | 556 | 81.6% | 125 | 18.4% | 681 |
| Baldwin | 75 | 58.1% | 54 | 41.9% | 129 |
| Bibb | 458 | 68.6% | 210 | 31.4% | 668 |
| Blount | 165 | 31.9% | 353 | 68.1% | 518 |
| Butler | 291 | 96.4% | 11 | 3.6% | 302 |
| Chambers | 513 | 89.8% | 58 | 10.2% | 571 |
| Clarke | 513 | 89.8% | 51 | 10.2% | 564 |
| Conecuh | 479 | 71.9% | 187 | 28.1% | 666 |
| Covington | 75 | 98.7% | 1 | 1.3% | 76 |
| Dallas | 766 | 77.5% | 223 | 22.5% | 989 |
| Franklin | 209 | 72.6% | 79 | 27.4% | 288 |
| Greene | 903 | 92.6% | 72 | 7.4% | 975 |
| Henry | 178 | 60.1% | 118 | 39.9% | 296 |
| Jackson & Decatur | 438 | 36.1% | 776 | 63.9% | 1,214 |
| Jefferson | 434 | 49.2% | 449 | 50.8% | 883 |
| Lauderdale | 463 | 47.0% | 633 | 53.0% | 1,096 |
| Lawrence | 462 | 32.3% | 969 | 67.7% | 1,431 |
| Limestone | 177 | 12.7% | 1,212 | 87.3% | 1,389 |
| Madison | 849 | 35.3% | 1,554 | 64.7% | 2,403 |
| Marengo | 392 | 89.7% | 45 | 10.3% | 437 |
| Marion | 376 | 92.2% | 32 | 7.8% | 408 |
| Mobile | 239 | 65.3% | 127 | 34.7% | 366 |
| Monroe | 829 | 80.5% | 201 | 19.5% | 1,030 |
| Montgomery | 758 | 77.3% | 222 | 22.7% | 980 |
| Morgan | 197 | 21.9% | 704 | 78.1% | 901 |
| Pickens | 178 | 72.1% | 69 | 27.9% | 247 |
| Pike | 79 | 100% | 0 | 0% | 79 |
| Perry | 655 | 95.8% | 29 | 4.2% | 684 |
| St. Clair | 419 | 65.2% | 224 | 34.8% | 643 |
| Shelby | 181 | 35.5% | 329 | 64.5% | 220 |
| Tuscaloosa | 575 | 43.1% | 760 | 56.9% | 1,335 |
| Washington | 254 | 73.6% | 91 | 26.4% | 345 |
| Wilcox | 444 | 88.4% | 58 | 11.6% | 502 |
| Totals | 13,580 | 57.5% | 10,033 | 42.5% | 23,613 |
