= George S. Houston Historic District =

Historic district in Alabama, United States

- U.S. National Register of Historic Places
- U.S. Historic district
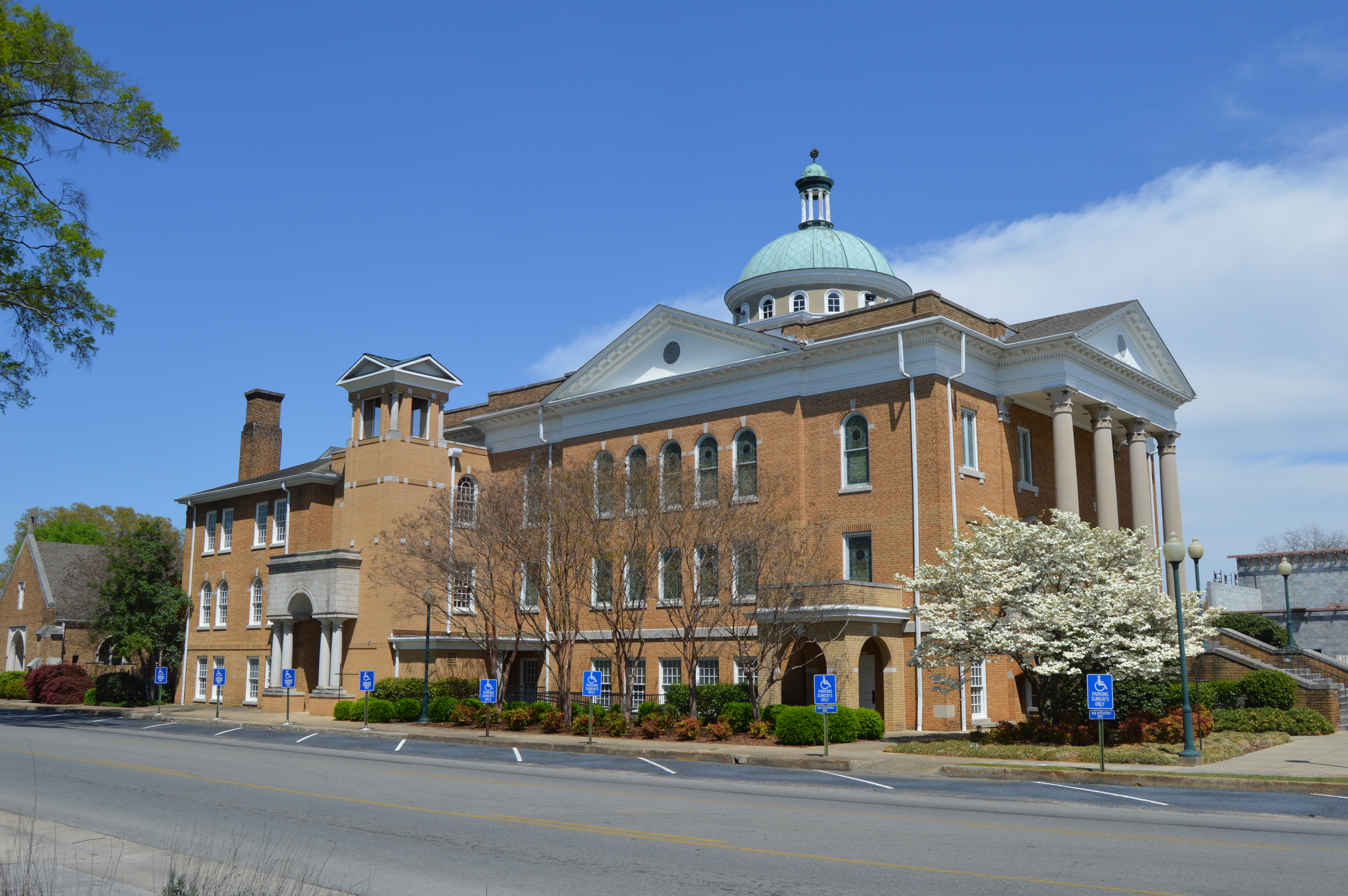
- The First Methodist Church in April 2014

- Location within Alabama Location within the United States
- Location: Roughly 2nd Ave., Jefferson St., McClellan St., Marion St., Hobbs St., Madison St., Washington St., and Houston St., Athens, Alabama
- Coordinates: 34°48′23″N 86°58′22″W
- Area: 43 acres (17 ha)
- Architectural style: Late 19th And 20th Century Revivals, Bungalow/Craftsman, Federal
- NRHP reference No.: 89000943
- Added to NRHP: July 20, 1989

The George S. Houston Historic District is a historic district in Athens, Alabama. The district lies to the west and north of the public square, and features homes of some of the town's most prominent residents. Development began in the district soon after the town was founded in 1818; there are five homes remaining from the antebellum period. The district saw moderate growth between the Civil War and the early 1900s, most of which are Queen Anne and Victorian styles. The majority of houses in the district were constructed between 1908 and 1939. As the need for housing in the town grew, larger antebellum lots were subdivided and new construction was added. Larger houses tended to be American Foursquares, while middle-class houses were bungalows and cottages, some with Tudor Revival and Colonial Revival details. The district is entirely residential, with the exception of the First Methodist Church, built in 1925 in Neoclassical style; 400 North Jefferson was built in 1935 as a hospital, but later converted to apartments. Other notable properties in the district include the George S. Houston House, which was converted into a public library. The district was listed on the National Register of Historic Places in 1989.
