= James J. Pleasants =

American politician

3rd Secretary of State of Alabama
- In office 1821–1824
- Governor: Israel Pickens
- Preceded by: Thomas A. Rodgers
- Succeeded by: James I. Thornton

Personal details
- Born: September 2, 1797
- Died: Unknown

James J. Pleasants served as the third Secretary of State of Alabama from 1821 to 1824.

He was married and had eight children, including the author, Julia Pleasants Creswell.
