= Cave Place =

Cave Place may refer to:

- Cave Place (Mooresville, Alabama), formerly listed on the National Register of Historic Places in Limestone County, Alabama
- Cave Place (Lexington, Kentucky), listed on the National Register of Historic Places in Fayette County, Kentucky
