= Thomas A. Rodgers =

American politician

2nd Secretary of State of Alabama
- In office 1819–1821
- Governor: William Wyatt Bibb; Thomas Bibb
- Preceded by: Henry Hitchcock
- Succeeded by: James J. Pleasants

Personal details
- Born: Unknown
- Died: September 28, 1821

Thomas A. Rodgers served as the second Secretary of State of Alabama from 1819 until his death on September 28, 1821.

In addition to serving as Secretary of State, he was a member of the 1819 Alabama Constitutional Convention.
