= 1821 Alabama gubernatorial election =

- August 6, 1821
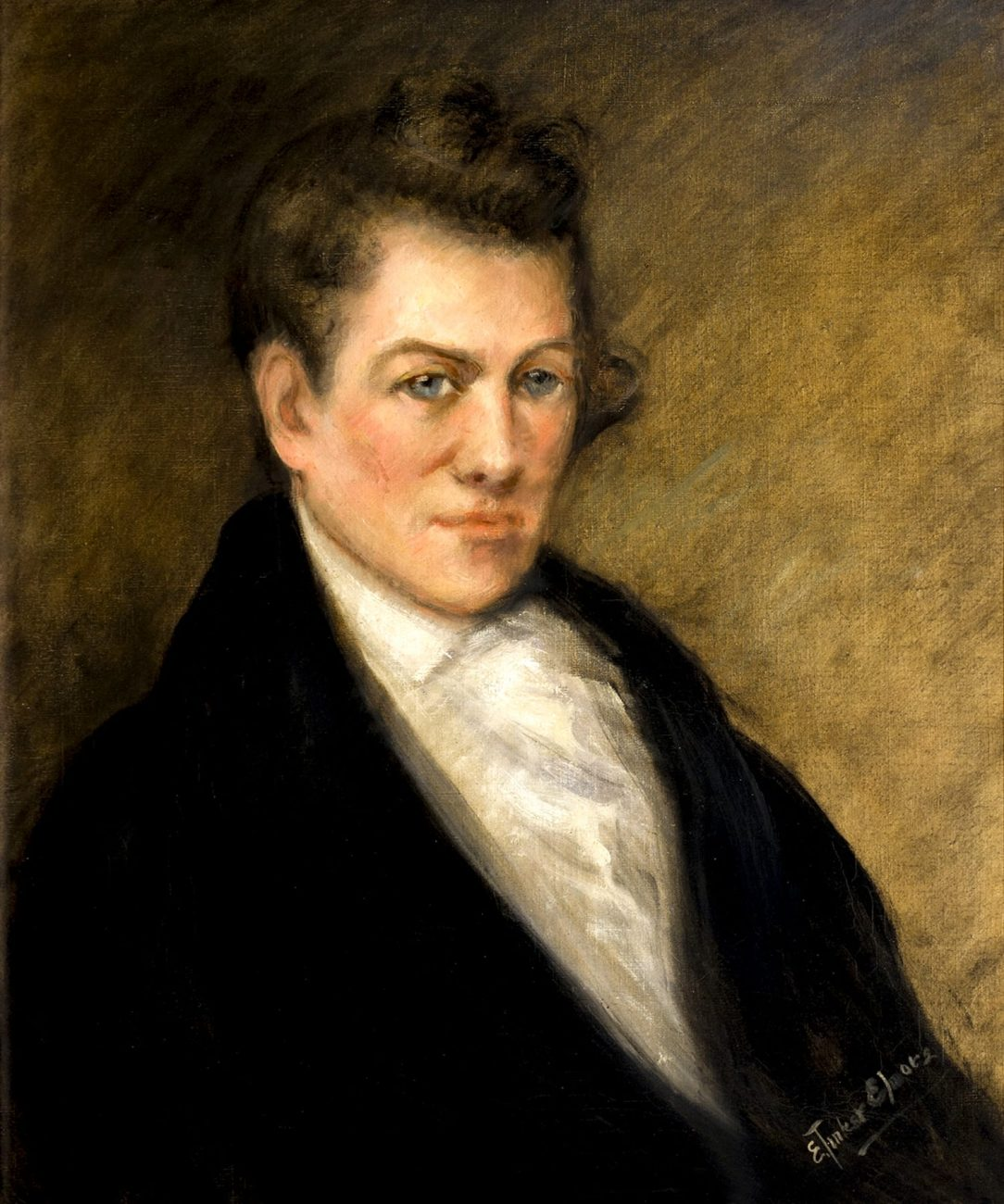

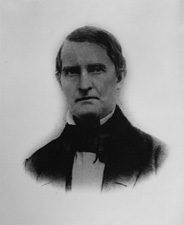
| Nominee | Israel Pickens | Henry H. Chambers |
| Party | Democratic-Republican | Democratic-Republican |
| Popular vote | 9,616 | 7,129 |
| Percentage | 57.43% | 42.57% |
- County results Pickens: 50–60% 60–70% 70–80% 80–90% >90% Chambers: 50–60% 60–70% 80–90% Unknown/No Vote
Governor before election
Thomas Bibb
Democratic-Republican
Elected Governor
Israel Pickens
Democratic-Republican

The 1821 Alabama gubernatorial election was held on August 6, 1821, to elect the third governor of Alabama. Democratic-Republican candidate Israel Pickens defeated fellow Democratic-Republican candidate Henry H. Chambers with 57.43% of the vote.

== General election ==
During the election campaign, it was alleged that Pickens had defrauded a woman in North Carolina while acting as her lawyer in a suit in Pennsylvania; the claim was refuted by accounts in letters to the Cahawba Press and Alabama Intelligencer.

=== Candidates ===
- Israel Pickens, US Representative for North Carolina 1811–1817
- Henry H. Chambers, Delegate to the Alabama Constitutional Convention and Alabama House member in 1820

=== Results ===
1821 Alabama gubernatorial election
| Party | Candidate | Votes | % | ±% |
|---|---|---|---|---|
| Democratic-Republican | Israel Pickens | 9,616 | 57.43% | 0.00% |
| Democratic-Republican | Henry H. Chambers | 7,129 | 42.57% | 0.00% |
| Total votes | | 16,745 | 100% | N/A |
| Democratic-Republican hold | | | | |

==== By county ====
County results
| County | Israel Pickens Democratic-Republican | | Henry Chambers Democratic-Republican | | Total votes |
| County | # | % | # | % | Total votes |
|---|---|---|---|---|---|
| Autagua | 330 | 64.1% | 185 | 35.9% | 515 |
| Baldwin | 98 | 51.5% | 96 | 48.5% | 194 |
| Bibb | 215 | 42.8% | 287 | 57.2% | 502 |
| Blount & Jefferson | 510 | 47.4% | 566 | 52.6% | 1,076 |
| Butler & Conecuh | 569 | 93.6% | 39 | 6.4% | 608 |
| Clarke | 569 | 93.1% | 42 | 6.9% | 611 |
| Dallas | 454 | 53.6% | 393 | 46.4% | 847 |
| Franklin | 329 | 56.5% | 253 | 43.5% | 612 |
| Greene & Marengo | 713 | 89.2% | 86 | 10.8% | 799 |
| Jackson | 392 | 38.5% | 625 | 61.5% | 1,017 |
| Lauderdale | 308 | 54.4% | 258 | 45.6% | 566 |
| Lawrence | 516 | 51.8% | 481 | 48.2% | 997 |
| Limestone | 169 | 16.0% | 886 | 84.0% | 1,055 |
| Madison | 948 | 44.8% | 1,168 | 55.2% | 2,116 |
| Marion | 158 | 90.8% | 16 | 9.2% | 174 |
| Mobile | 89 | 48.9% | 93 | 51.1% | 182 |
| Monroe | 931 | 89.8% | 106 | 10.2% | 1,037 |
| Montgomery | 531 | 71.1% | 216 | 28.9% | 747 |
| Morgan | 408 | 52.7% | 316 | 47.3% | 724 |
| Perry | 314 | 84.9% | 56 | 15.1% | 370 |
| St. Clair | 359 | 68.5% | 165 | 31.5% | 524 |
| Shelby | 59 | 19.0% | 251 | 81.0% | 310 |
| Tuscaloosa | 716 | 65.5% | 377 | 34.5% | 1,093 |
| Washington | 245 | 52.5% | 222 | 47.5% | 467 |
| Totals (Note: Dubin notes that three newly created counties (Henry, Pickens, and Wilcox) do not have any returned ballots. It is possible that those returns were included in the returns of their neighboring counties.) | 9,616 | 57.4% | 7,129 | 42.6% | 16,745 |
