= Henry H. Chambers =

American politician (1790–1826)

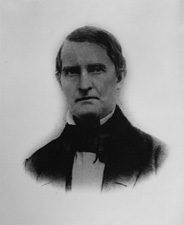

United States Senator from Alabama
- In office March 4, 1825 – January 24, 1826
- Preceded by: William Kelly
- Succeeded by: Israel Pickens

Personal details
- Born: October 1, 1790 Kenbridge, Virginia
- Died: January 24, 1826 (aged 35) Kenbridge, Virginia
- Party: Democratic-Republican, Jacksonian
- Education: College of William & Mary; University of Pennsylvania

Henry H. Chambers (October 1, 1790 – January 24, 1826) was an American politician, who served as the Jacksonian U.S. senator from the state of Alabama from March 4, 1825 until his death. He was replaced by Israel Pickens until a replacement, John McKinley, could be elected.

== Biography ==
Henry Chambers was born on October 1, 1790, in Lunenburg County, Virginia. He attended and graduated from the College of William & Mary in 1808 and from the University of Pennsylvania School of Medicine in Philadelphia in 1811. Chambers moved to Madison, Alabama and began practicing medicine. After serving in the American Indian Wars as a surgeon, he returned to Alabama, settling in Huntsville. He served as a member of the Alabama Constitutional Convention in 1819 and in the Alabama House of Representatives in 1820.

After unsuccessfully running for Governor of Alabama in 1821 and 1823, Chambers was elected as a Jacksonian to represent the state in the United States Senate. He assumed office on March 4, 1825, until his death. He died on January 24, 1826, at Flat Rock near Kenbridge, Virginia, while en route to Washington, D.C. Chambers was interred in the family burial ground at Flat Rock.

== See also ==
- List of members of the United States Congress who died in office (1790–1899)

U.S. Senate
| Preceded by William Kelly | U.S. senator (Class 3) from Alabama; 1825–1826; Served alongside: William R. King | Succeeded by Israel Pickens |
