= Robert Beaty Historic District =

Historic district in Alabama

- U.S. National Register of Historic Places
- U.S. Historic district
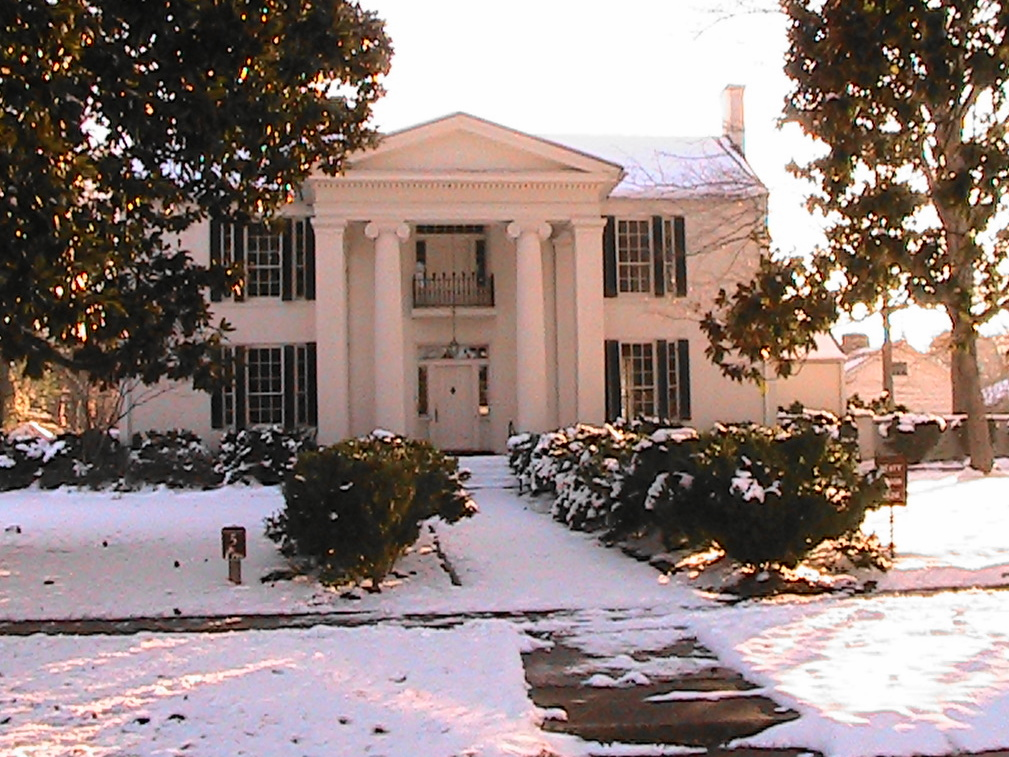
- The Beaty-Mason House in January 2010

- Location within Alabama Location within the United States
- Location: Roughly bounded by Louisville and Nashville RR, Forrest, East, and Washington Sts., Athens, Alabama
- Coordinates: 34°48′1″N 86°58′1″W
- Area: 43.4 acres (17.6 ha)
- Built: 1818
- Architectural style: Mid 19th Century Revival, Federal, Late Victorian
- NRHP reference No.: 84000646
- Added to NRHP: August 30, 1984

The Robert Beaty Historic District is a historic district in Athens, Alabama. Robert Beaty was one of the original founders of Athens. An Irish immigrant who settled in Virginia, Beaty and his associates purchased 160 acres (65 ha) around a spring, and began subdividing the land for sale in 1818. A small village of log structures had formed by 1826, and began to be replaced by permanent homes over the next decade. Beaty's own house was completed in Federal style in 1826. William Richardson, whose son William, Jr., served in the U.S. House of Representatives, completed his home the following year. The district contains 86 contributing properties representing architectural styles including Federal, Greek Revival, Italianate, Eastlake, Victorian, and Spanish Colonial Revival. The district was listed on the National Register of Historic Places in 1984.
