= Robert Donnell House =

Historic house in Alabama, United States

- U.S. National Register of Historic Places
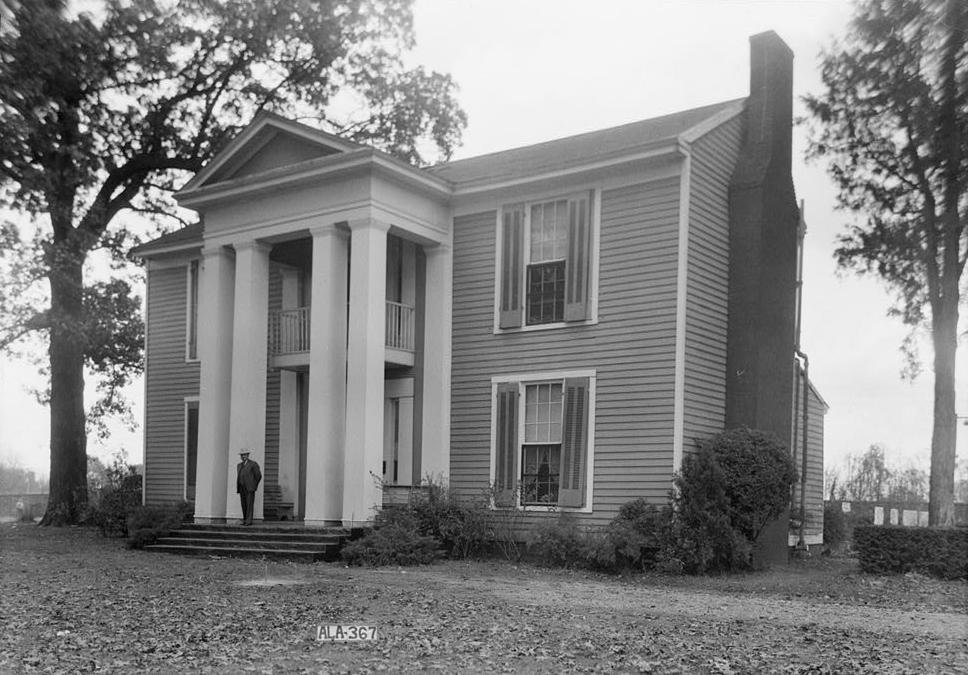
- The house in October 1935

- Location within Alabama Location within the United States
- Location: 601 S. Clinton St., Athens, Alabama
- Coordinates: 34°47′46″N 86°58′5″W
- Area: less than one acre
- Built: 1840
- NRHP reference No.: 73000354
- Added to NRHP: September 19, 1973

The Robert Donnell House (also known as the City Superintendent's House) is a historic house located at 601 South Clinton Street in Athens, Alabama.

== Description and history ==
The house was built in 1840 by Robert Donnell, a minister who had come to Athens in the 1820s to establish a Presbyterian church. After his death in 1855, the house passed to his son, James. It was purchased in 1869 by Joshua P. Coman in order to establish the Athens Male College, beginning the house's association with education. In 1879, it was purchased by the city and became part of the public school campus, and sold ten years later to the North Alabama Experiment Station and Agricultural School. The house returned to city ownership in 1936, and is today part of the campus of Athens Elementary School (formerly Athens Middle School). The house is a two-story frame structure clad in clapboard. A double-height portico with paired square columns covers the entry. The main block has a center-hall plan, with a two-story, gable roofed wing off the rear.

The house was listed on the National Register of Historic Places on September 19, 1973.
