= Athens Downtown Historic District =

Historic district in Ohio, United States

- U.S. National Register of Historic Places
- U.S. Historic district
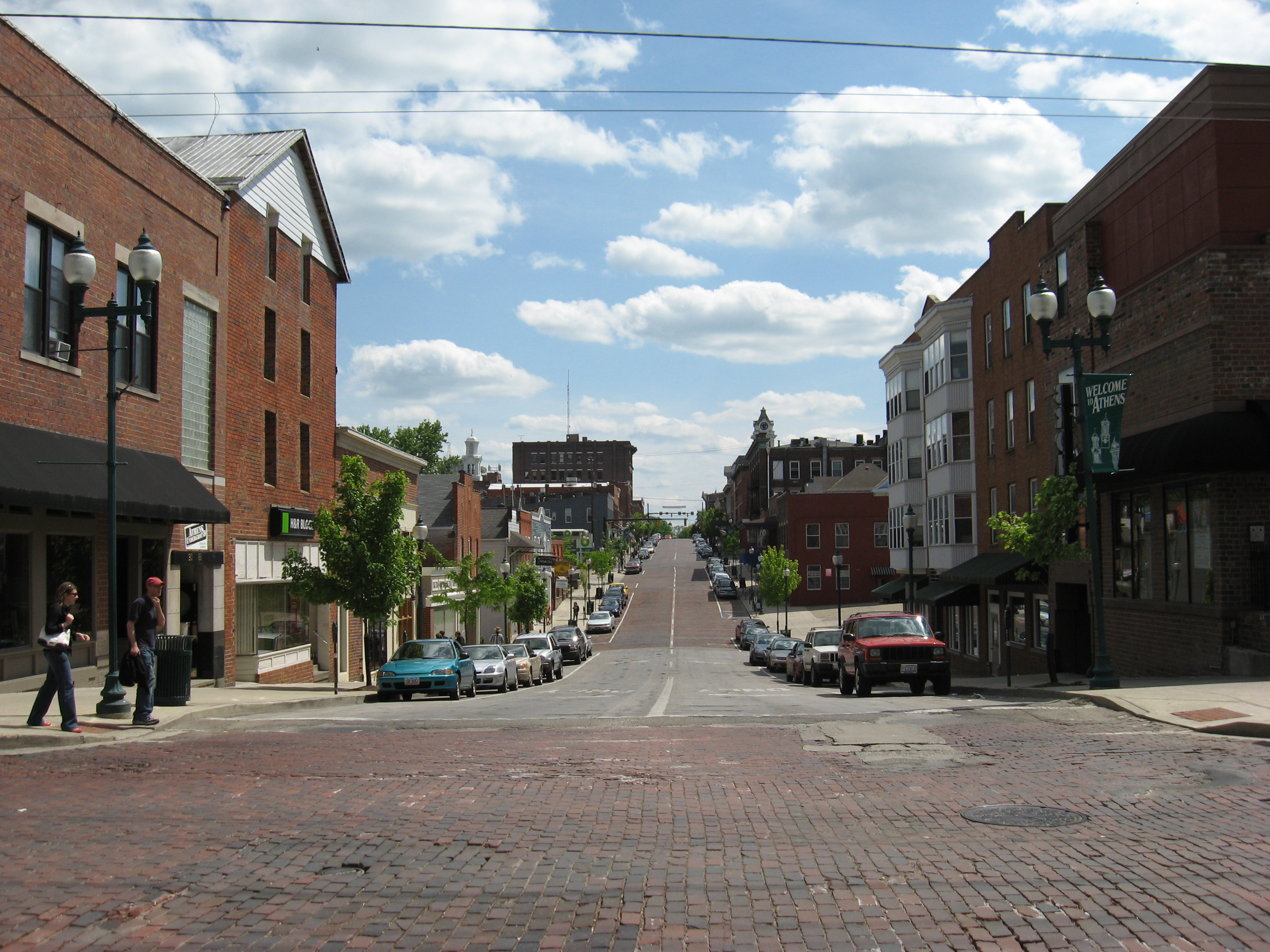
- North Court Street between Washington and Carpenter Streets

- Location within Ohio Location within the United States
- Location: N. Court St. between Carpenter and Union Sts. and Congress and College Sts., Athens, Ohio
- Coordinates: 39°19′48″N 82°6′5″W
- Area: 215 acres (0.87 km^{2})
- Architectural style: Late Victorian
- NRHP reference No.: 82003541
- Added to NRHP: September 30, 1982

Athens Downtown Historic District is a registered historic district in Athens, Ohio, United States, listed in the National Register on September 30, 1982. It contains 88 contributing buildings, made from an assortment of materials.

The architecture is in the style of Late Victorian with periods of significance from 1900 to 1924, 1875–1899, and 1850–1874. The downtown district is currently being used for Commerce / Trade, Domestic, Education, and Government.

The district has a number of contiguous contributing buildings, many with brick facades, bracketed cornices, and decorative arched stone lintels.

== Historic uses ==
- College
- Manufacturing Facility
- Extractive Facility
