= Israel Pickens =

Democratic governor of and U.S. Senator from Alabama

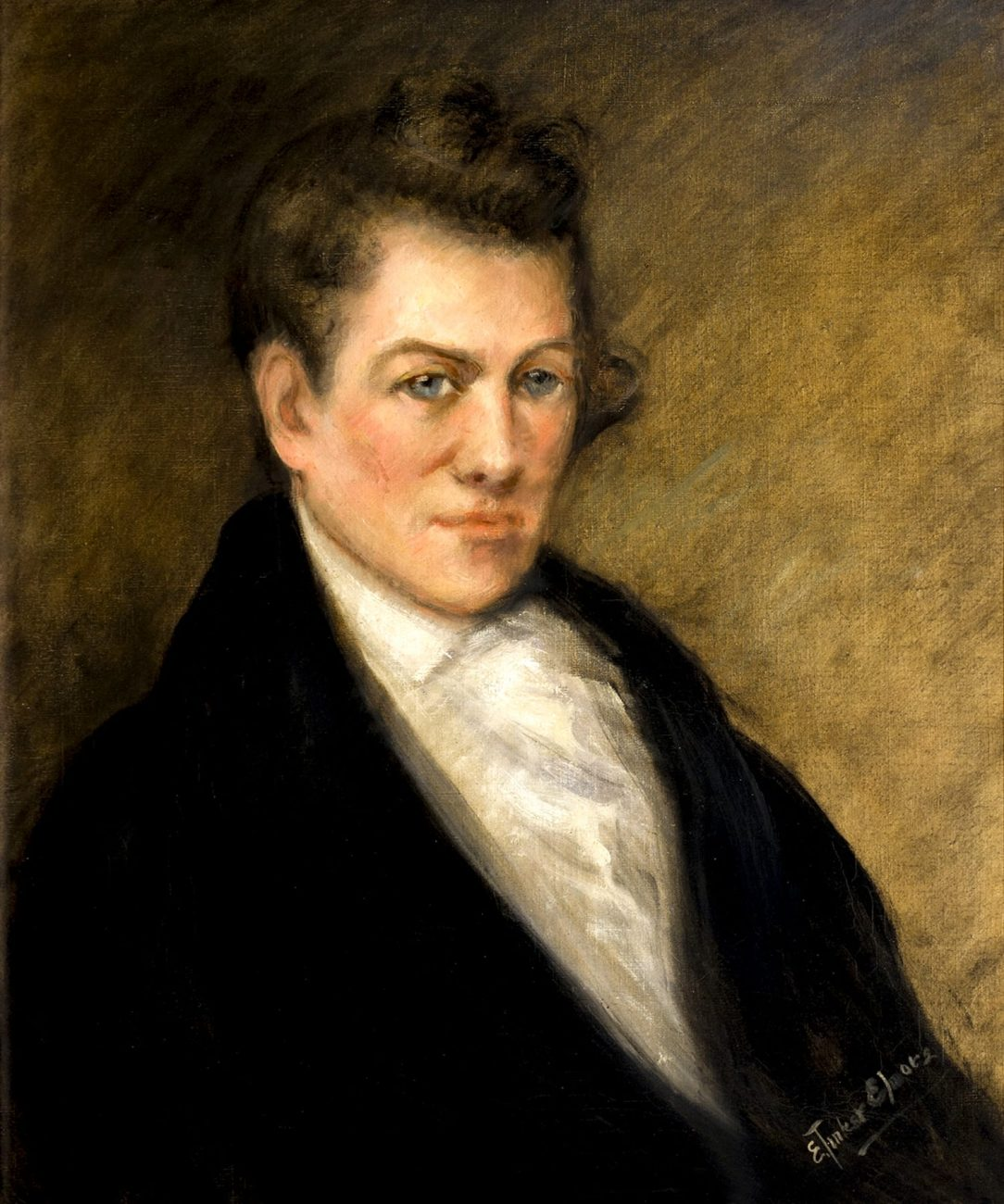
- Posthumous portrait, c. 1930

United States Senator from Alabama
- In office February 17, 1826 – November 27, 1826
- Appointed by: John Murphy
- Preceded by: Henry H. Chambers
- Succeeded by: John McKinley

3rd Governor of Alabama
- In office November 9, 1821 – November 25, 1825
- Preceded by: Thomas Bibb
- Succeeded by: John Murphy

Member of the U.S. House of Representatives from North Carolina
- In office March 4, 1811 – March 3, 1817
- Preceded by: James Holland (11th); Meshack Franklin (12th)
- Succeeded by: Peter Forney (11th); Felix Walker (12th)
- Constituency: 11th district (1811–1813); 12th district (1813–17)

Member of the North Carolina Senate
- In office 1808–1810

Personal details
- Born: January 30, 1780 Concord, North Carolina, US
- Died: April 24, 1827 (aged 47) Matanzas, Cuba
- Resting place: Greensboro Cemetery, Greensboro, Alabama
- Party: Democratic
- Other political affiliations: Democratic-Republican
- Education: Jefferson College
- Profession: Lawyer

Israel Pickens (January 30, 1780 – April 24, 1827) was an American politician and lawyer, the third governor of Alabama from 1821 to 1825, member of the North Carolina Senate from 1808 to 1810, and a member of the United States House of Representatives from 1811 to 1817 for North Carolina.

== Biography ==
Born in Concord, North Carolina, Pickens graduated from Jefferson College (now Washington & Jefferson College) in 1802, studied law, and was admitted to the bar. Pickens was a native of North Carolina and represented the "North Carolina Faction" in early Alabama politics, like fellow North Carolina Representative William R. King, with whom he served Congress during the early 1810s. The main opposition to the "North Carolina Faction" was the "Georgia Faction", which many new settlers to the state viewed as too aristocratic and elitist. At the same time, Pickens was seen as the "spokesman for the have-nots." Pickens married Martha Lenoir in 1814, the daughter of North Carolina statesman William Lenoir. In both 1821 and 1823, Pickens beat Dr. Henry Chambers by a vote of 9,114 to 7,129 and 6,942 to 4,604, respectively.

After serving as governor and being succeeded by his handpicked man John Murphy, Pickens was appointed to the United States Senate to fill the vacancy left by the death of Henry H. Chambers, whom he beat twice for the governorship. He only served from February 17 to November 27, 1826, when the elected successor, John McKinley, took office.

In addition to politics, Pickens participated in the American Colonization Society and was interested in scientific research. He invented a lunar dial.

Pickens died in Matanzas, Cuba, in 1827. He was originally buried in a family graveyard, but his remains were later moved to City Cemetery, Greensboro, Alabama.

U.S. House of Representatives
Preceded by James Holland	Member of the U.S. House of Representatives from North Carolina's 11th congressional district 1811–1813	Succeeded by Peter Forney
Preceded by Meshack Franklin	Member of the U.S. House of Representatives from North Carolina's 12th congressional district 1813–1817	Succeeded by Felix Walker
Political offices
Preceded by Thomas Bibb	Governor of Alabama; 1821–1825	Succeeded by John Murphy
U.S. Senate
Preceded by Henry H. Chambers	U.S. senator (Class 3) from Alabama; 1826; Served alongside: William R. King	Succeeded by John McKinley
