= Old Athens, Alabama Main Post Office =

- U.S. National Register of Historic Places
- U.S. Historic district – Contributing property
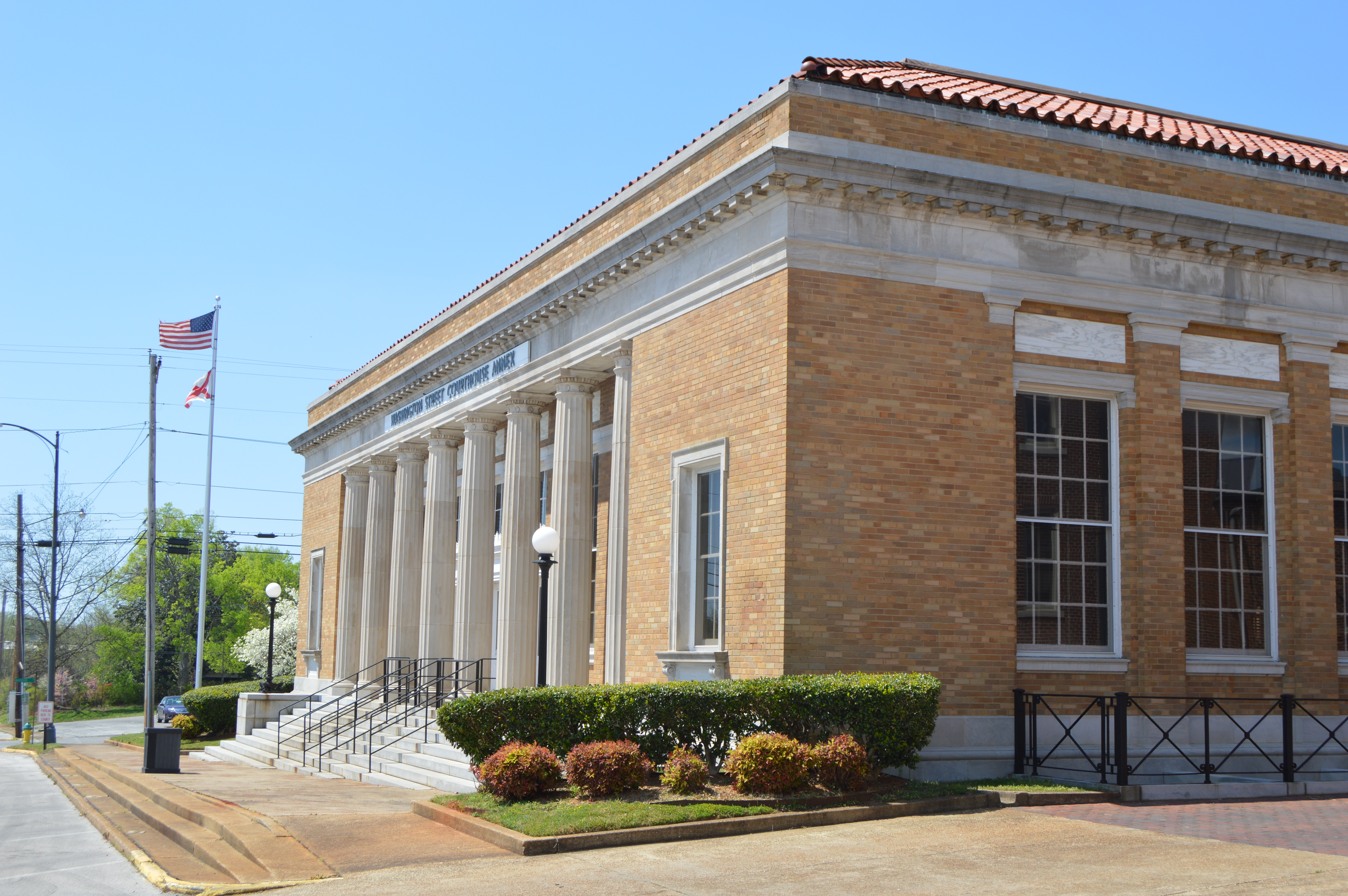
- Front of the post office

- Location within Alabama Location within the United States
- Location: 310 W. Washington St., Athens, Alabama
- Coordinates: 34°48′9″N 86°58′22″W
- Area: less than one acre
- Built: 1933
- Architect: Britt Alderman
- Architectural style: Classical Revival
- Part of: Athens Courthouse Square Commercial Historic District (ID97001164)
- NRHP reference No.: 82002047

Significant dates
- Added to NRHP: February 18, 1982
- Designated CP: October 10, 1997

The Old Main Post Office in Athens, Alabama, also known as Washington Street Courthouse Annex, was built in 1933. Located one block from the Courthouse Square, the Neoclassical Revival building was constructed by the Works Progress Administration. It was added to the National Register of Historic Places in 1982.

== History ==
With the assistance of Congressman Edward B. Almon, the U.S. Congress authorized $70,000 through the Works Progress Administration to purchase a site and build a new post office for Athens, Alabama. The Athens Post office was built starting on September 15, 1932 to in Athens, Alabama, one block from Courthouse Square. It officially opened on November 1, 1933 and was dedicated on December 18, 1933 by Congressman Archibald H. Carmichael. Its first post master was C. W. Sarver, a former mayor of Athens who had worked to get funding for the post office.

In the 1970s, the U.S. Postal Service relocated the post office to a new location. The Limestone County Commission purchased the former post office in February 1979 for $103,500. The former post office was converted to a Washington Street Courthouse Annex in 1979. The county's archives were housed in the building's basement from 1980 to 2004.

It was listed on the National Register of Historic Places on February 18, 1982. It is also a contributing property to the Athens Courthouse Square Commercial Historic District, established on October 10, 1997.

== Architecture ==
The Athens Main Post Office was designed in the Neoclassical Revival style by Atlanta architect Britt Alderman. It was built by W. B. Smith of El Dorado, Arkansas.

It is a one-story brick building. Its front is a colonnade divided by eight limestone Doric columns. Granite stairs flanked by original cast iron lamps lead to three sets of doors in the center bays. The lobby features marble floors, wainscoting, pilasters, and door trim.

== See also ==
- List of United States post offices
