= Houston Memorial Library =

Historic house in Alabama, United States

- Governor George Smith Houston House
- U.S. National Register of Historic Places
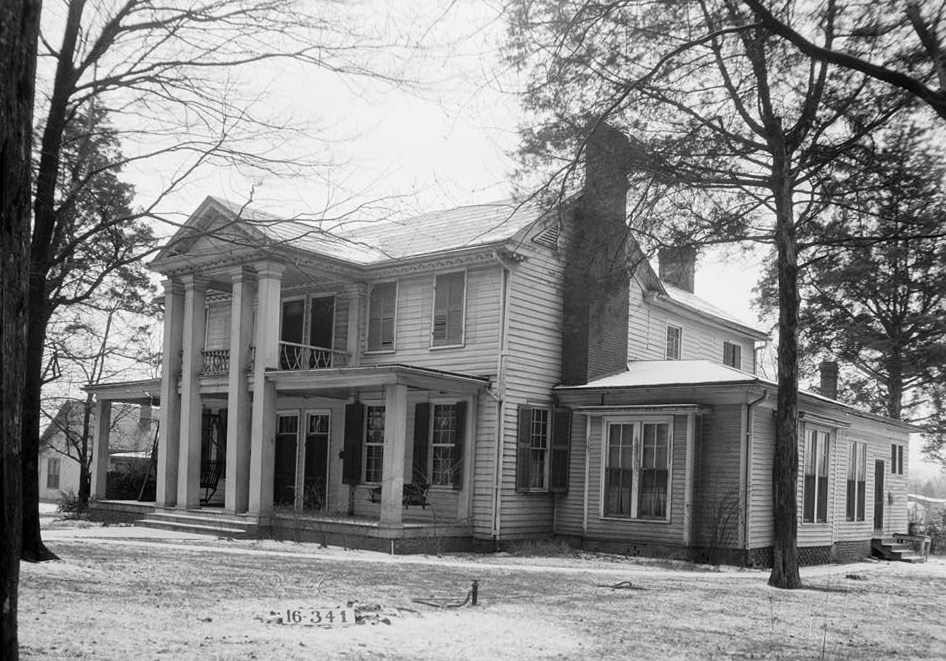
- Governor George S. Houston House in 1934

- Location within Alabama Location within the United States
- Location: 101 N. Houston St., Athens, Alabama
- Coordinates: 34°48′13″N 86°58′29″W
- Area: less than one acre
- Built: 1835
- Architectural style: Federal
- NRHP reference No.: 86001043
- Added to NRHP: May 15, 1986

The Houston Memorial Library, previously the Governor George Smith Houston House, is a historic residence in Athens, Alabama. It was built in Federal style in 1835. The house was listed on the National Register of Historic Places in 1986.

== History ==
The land on which the house stands was purchased in 1818, and passed between several owners before being purchased by Micajah Thomas. Thomas is believed to have built the house in the 1830s, although the exact date of construction is not known, and it may have been built around an earlier log structure. Then-U.S. Congressman George Smith Houston moved to Athens from Lauderdale County and purchased the house in 1845. He served in Congress from 1841 until 1849, and again from 1851 until 1861. Following Reconstruction, Houston was elected Governor of Alabama, serving from 1874 until 1878. He was elected to the U.S. Senate in 1878, serving until his death on December 31, 1879. His widow, Ellen, lived in the house until her death in 1909. The house was later rented by the Kiwanis Club, and in 1938, the Houston family donated the house to the city to be used as a public library.

== Architecture ==
The Houston House is a two-story, wooden house built in the Federal style. Four square columns support a two-story portico and second floor balcony. The balcony extended across the entire front of the house by Ellen Houston, but was truncated after her death. Side-by-side front doors open into separate rooms, a layout repeated on the upper balcony. A dining room was added on the north side of the house in the late 19th century.
