= Belle Mina =

- U.S. National Register of Historic Places
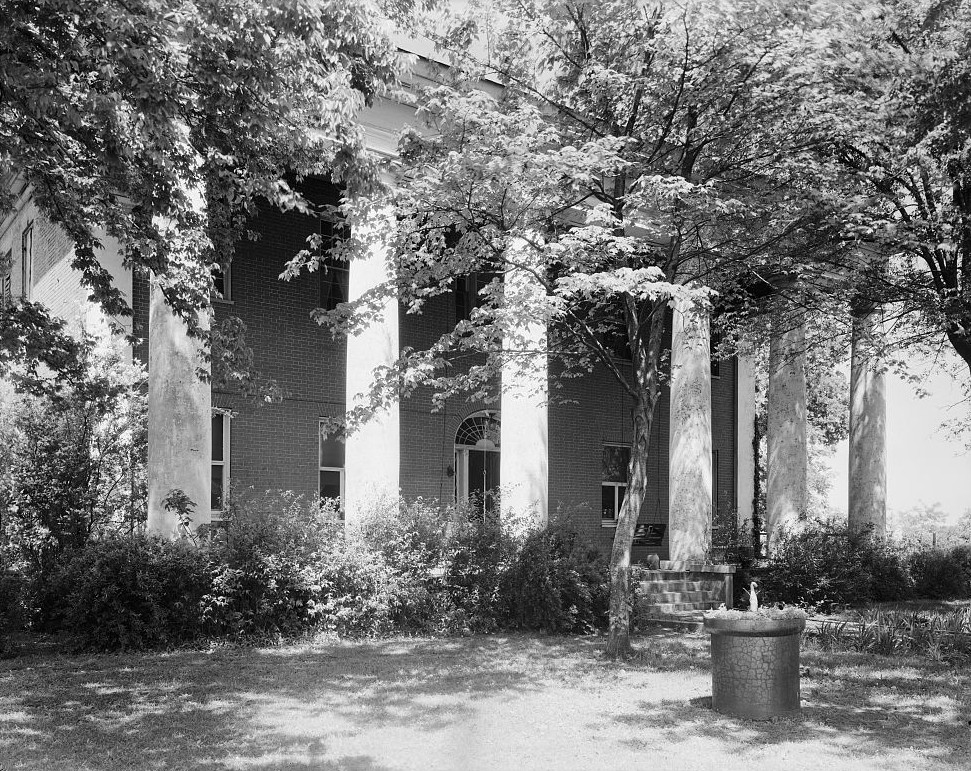
- The main house in 1939

- Location within Alabama Location within the United States
- Location: Belle Mina, Alabama
- Coordinates: 34°38′41″N 86°52′49″W
- Area: 9 acres (3.6 ha)
- Built: 1826
- Architectural style: Late Georgian
- NRHP reference No.: 72000164
- Added to NRHP: October 31, 1972

Belle Mina, known as Belmina during the 19th century, is a historic forced-labor farm and plantation house in Belle Mina, Alabama, United States. Completed in 1826, the Late Georgian-style house was built for Alabama's second governor, Thomas Bibb.

Originally located at the center of a 2,500-acre (10 km^{2}) agricultural forced-labor complex, the red brick main house is one of the earliest Alabama examples of a stereotypical columned plantation house. The house and surrounding 9 acres (3.6 ha) were added to the National Register of Historic Places on October 31, 1972.

== History ==
As the area was still being converted from a frontier, there was no sawed lumber or ready-made brick available when Bibb set out to build the house. So he used the profits from crops grown by enslaved people to raise a sawmill and build a brick kiln. Bibb enslaved skilled artisans to produce the construction materials and build the house. It took him several years to find and enslave a highly skilled mason and an expert carpenter. The house was basically complete by 1826, although work on various buildings of the plantation complex continued up to 1835.

Bibb died in 1839, but the plantation remained in his family until 1941. At that time it was purchased by Dr. and Mrs. Berthold Kennedy, who renovated the mansion shortly afterwards. Another renovation was completed in 1967. At that time a kitchen wing and garage were built and some minor interior modifications were done.

Another plantation home, Woodside, was built on the estate one half-mile from the main house. This wedding gift for Bibb's daughter, built in 1860–61, was completely destroyed in a fire on November 18, 2022.

== Architecture ==
The two-story brick structure features exterior walls that are 3 feet (0.91 m) thick, laid in Flemish bond. The front (east) elevation of the house is dominated by a monumental Tuscan hexastyle portico that spans the entire five-bay, 60-foot (18 m) wide front facade. The floor of the stylobate and the columns are brick. The portico shelters the main front entrance with its delicate fanlight and sidelights in the central bay. A three-part window is centered above the front entrance. The remaining bays are defined by rectangular twelve-over-twelve sash windows on both levels. A hip roof, originally crowned by a balustrade, covers both the portico and main structure. An original one-story, semi-detached brick service wing with three rooms is located towards the rear of the house, on the south side.

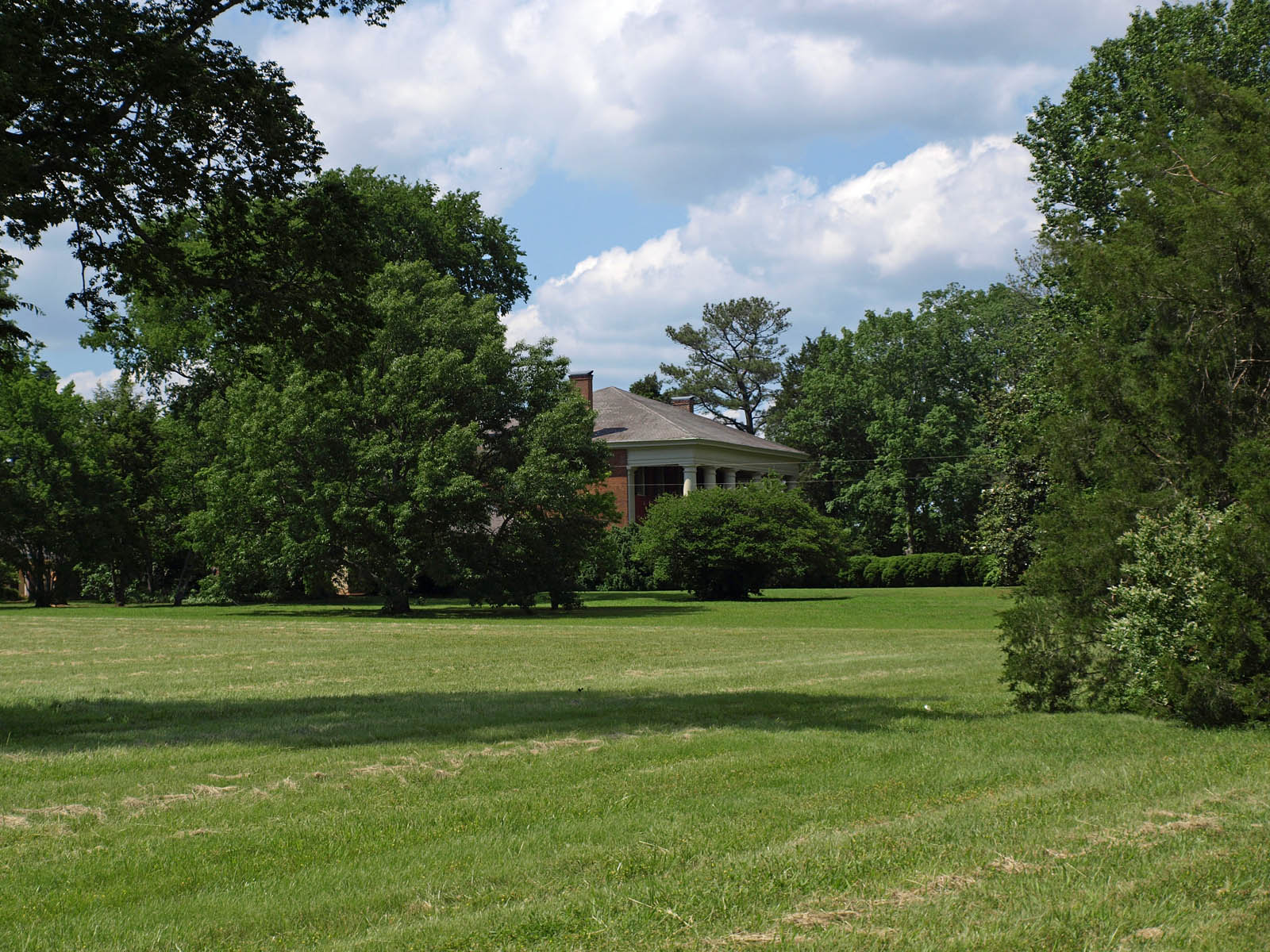
The main house and grounds of Belle Mina in 2011.

The house and grounds were originally surrounded by a 5-foot (1.5 m) high brick wall. It was demolished during the Civil War. The rooftop deck and balustrade were destroyed in a tornado on July 16, 1875.

The interior of the house features Federal-style woodwork, Adam-style fireplace mantels, and a spiral primary stairway. The floor plan is based on the center-hall prototype, with two large primary rooms to either side of a 15-by-60-foot (4.6 m × 18.3 m) hallway. The first floor also features a side hall and a secondary stairway.

== See also ==
- List of plantations in Alabama
