= Belle Mina, Alabama =

Unincorporated community in Alabama, United States

- Unincorporated community
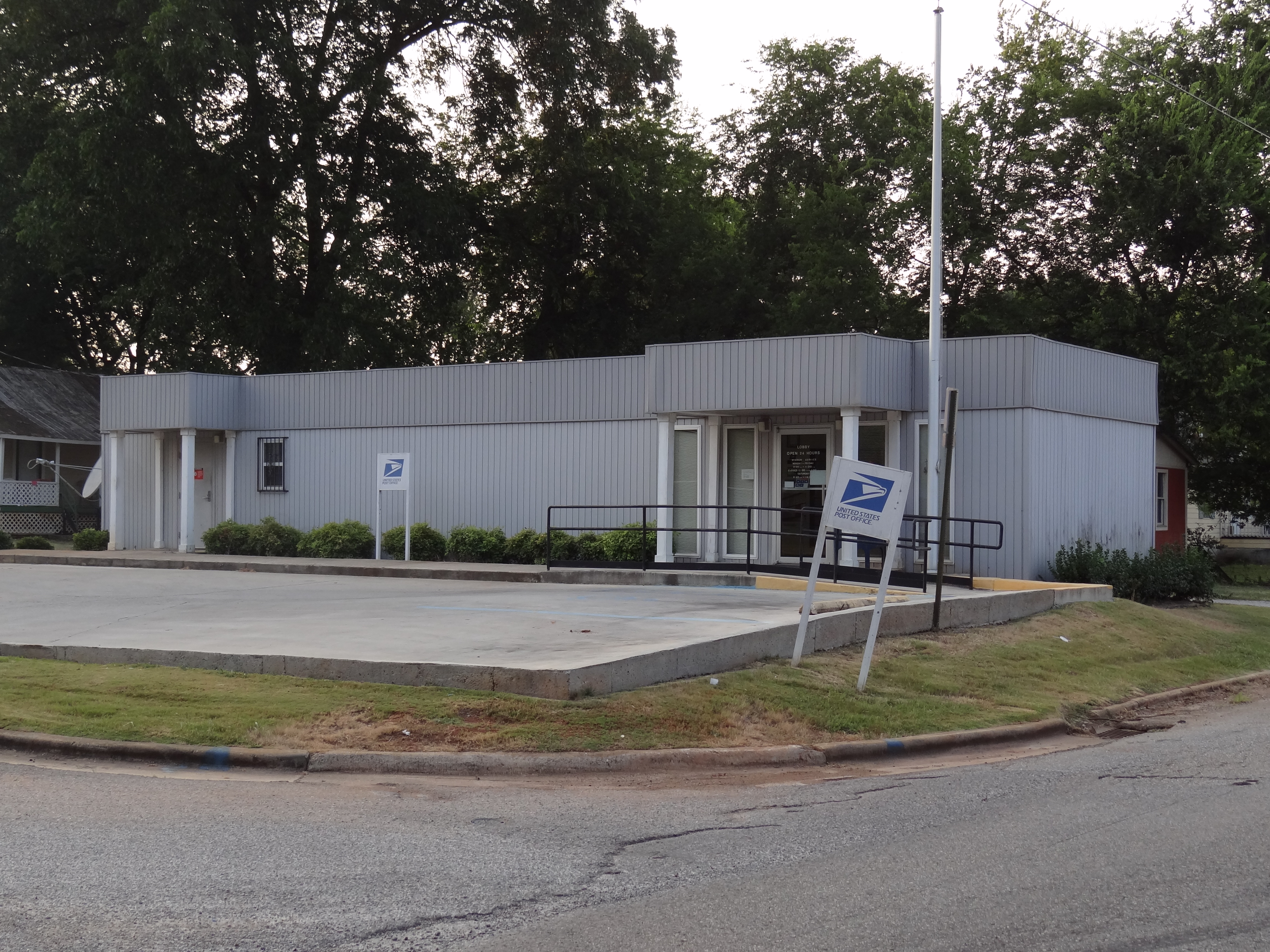
- Post office in Belle Mina

- Location within Alabama Location within the United States
- Coordinates: 34°39′23″N 86°52′36″W
- Country: United States
- State: Alabama
- County: Limestone
- Elevation: 600 ft (180 m)

Population (2020 estimate)
  - Total: 113
- Time zone: UTC-6 (Central (CST))
  - Summer (DST): UTC-5 (CDT)
- ZIP code: 35615
- Area code: 256
- GNIS feature ID: 151675

Belle Mina is an unincorporated community in southeastern Limestone County, Alabama, United States. As of 2020 the population was estimated to be around 113 people. The town center is approximately one mile away from Mazda Toyota Manufacturing, U.S.A., Inc.

The city has many residences, a volunteer fire department, and a post office, and is home to the South Limestone Cotton Mill.

== History ==
The community of Belle Mina was named for the plantation of the same name that belonged to Governor Thomas Bibb, the second governor of the state of Alabama. It was originally called "Belle Manor", but because of southern pronunciation, the spelling changed over time. The name is derived from the French word "belle", meaning "beautiful". The plantation was situated along the Southern Railroad, and there was a station at or near the plantation. A post office was established in Belle Mina in 1878. The community served as the rail stop for Mooresville.

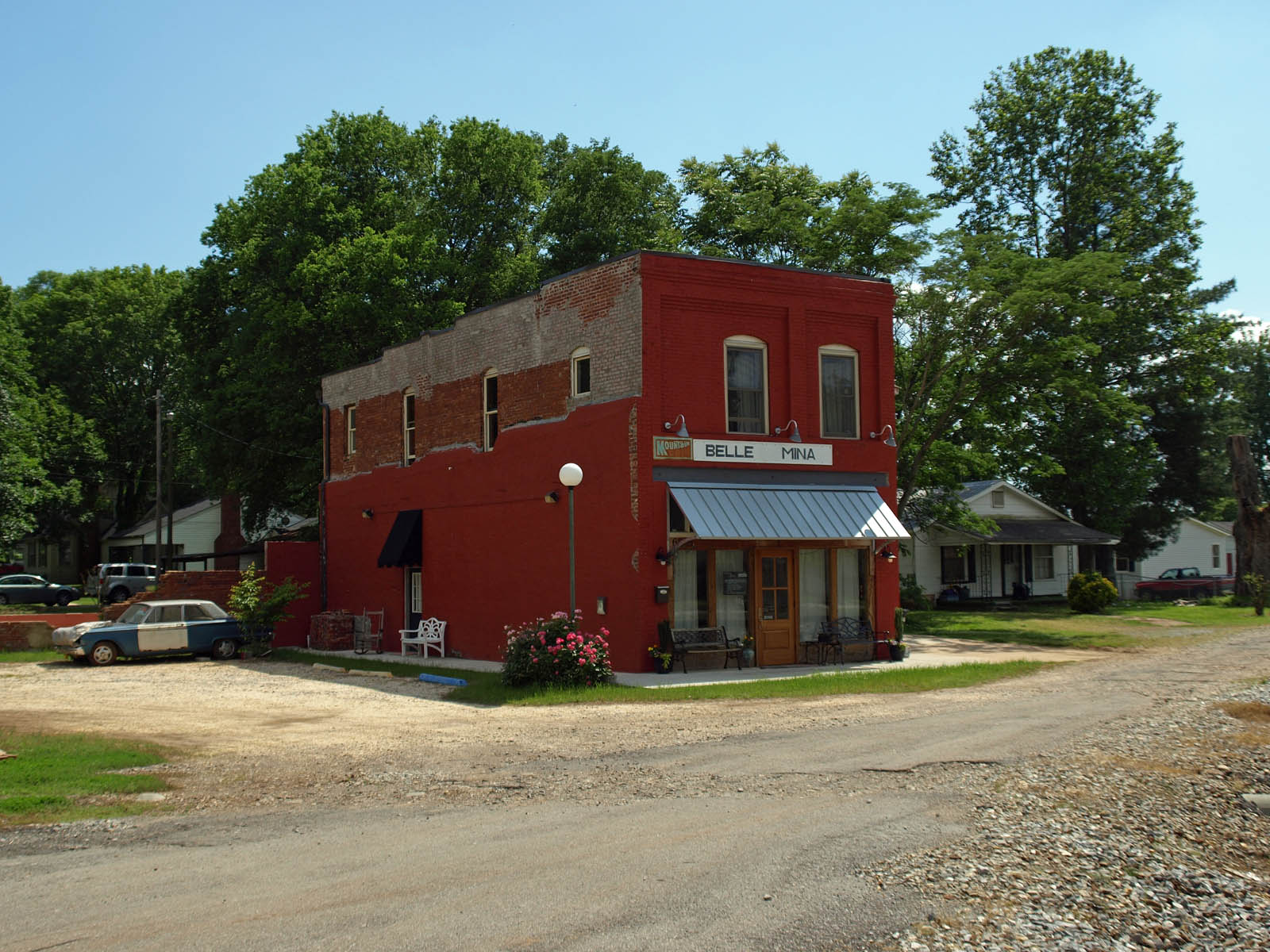
Store in Bella Mina

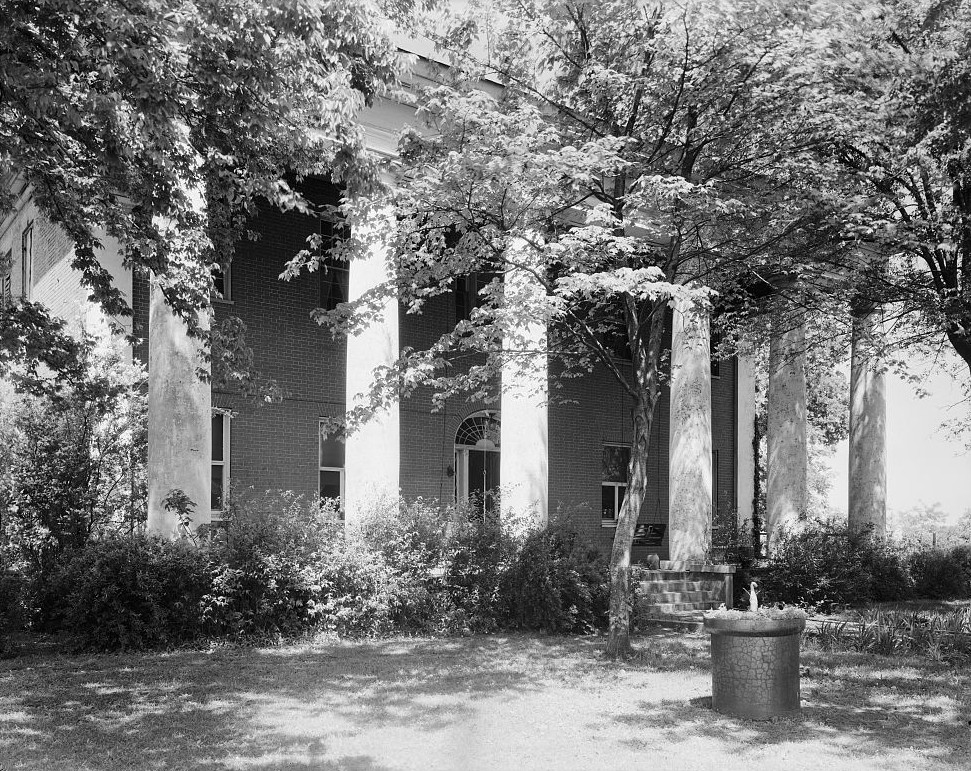
Gov. Thomas Bibb House
