= Athens Courthouse Square Commercial Historic District =

Historic district in Alabama, United States

- U.S. National Register of Historic Places
- U.S. Historic district
- Alabama Register of Landmarks and Heritage
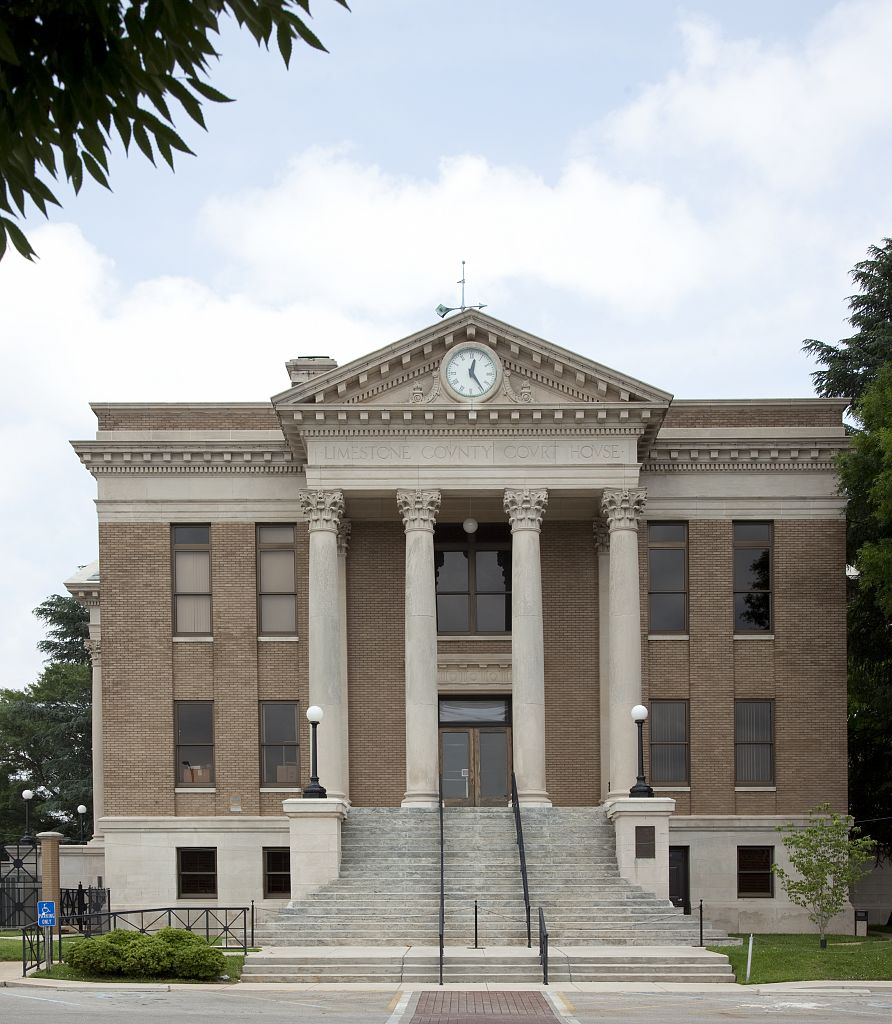
- The Limestone County Courthouse in 2010

- Location within Alabama Location within the United States
- Location: Roughly bounded by Clinton, Hobbs, Madison, and Green Sts., Athens, Alabama
- Coordinates: 34°48′10″N 86°58′16″W
- Area: 14 acres (5.7 ha)
- Architect: Multiple
- Architectural style: Late Gothic Revival, Classical Revival, Greek Revival
- NRHP reference No.: 97001164

Significant dates
- Added to NRHP: October 10, 1997
- Designated ARLH: August 23, 2012

The Athens Courthouse Square Commercial Historic District is a historic district in Athens, Alabama. Athens was founded in 1818 when Robert Beaty and John D. Carroll began selling tracts of land. The following year, the town was chosen as the county seat of the newly formed Limestone County. Commercial development around the courthouse square was swift, aided by the strong cotton market. The town and courthouse suffered heavy damage during the Civil War in the Battle of Sulphur Creek Trestle. Athens' revival was slowed by major fires in 1882, 1894, and 1897, as well as the Panic of 1893. Redevelopment was spurred again in the 1910s and 1920s by a diversified economy with increased manufacturing, and in the 1930s by electricity provided by the Tennessee Valley Authority. Notable buildings in the district are the Limestone County Courthouse, built in 1919 in Neoclassical style with Palladian influences. The Old Post Office building was completed in 1933. The district was listed on the National Register of Historic Places in 1997 and the Alabama Register of Landmarks and Heritage in 2012.
