= William W. Bibb =

American politician and 1st Governor of Alabama

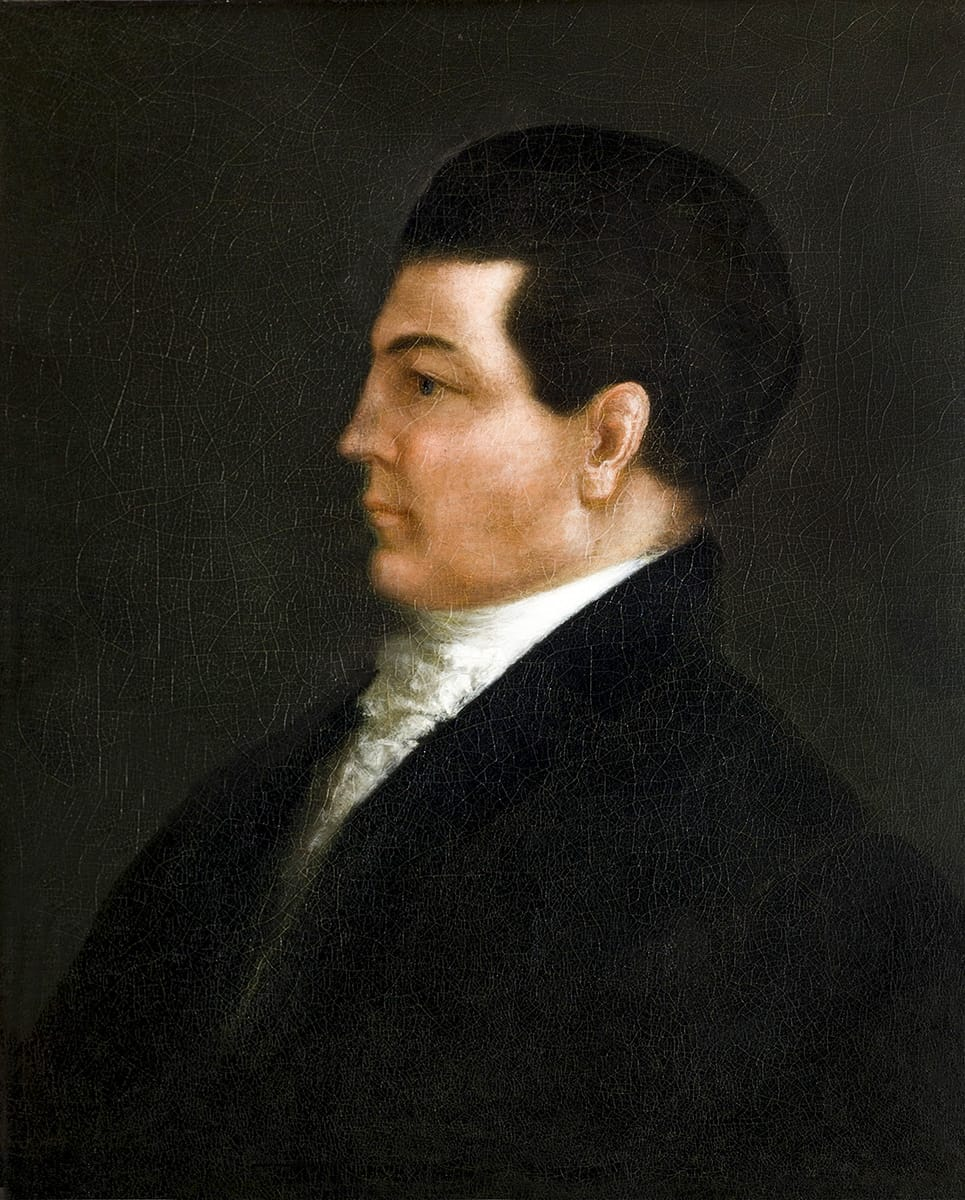
- Portrait, c. 1819

1st Governor of Alabama
- In office December 14, 1819 – July 10, 1820
- Preceded by: Position established
- Succeeded by: Thomas Bibb

1st Territorial Governor of Alabama
- In office March 6, 1817 – December 14, 1819
- Appointed by: James Monroe
- Preceded by: Position established
- Succeeded by: Himself as Governor

United States Senator from Georgia
- In office November 6, 1813 – November 9, 1816
- Preceded by: William B. Bulloch
- Succeeded by: George Troup

Member of the U.S. House of Representatives from Georgia's at-large district
- In office January 26, 1807 – November 6, 1813
- Preceded by: Thomas Spalding
- Succeeded by: Alfred Cuthbert

Member of the Georgia House of Representatives from Elbert County
- In office 1803–1805

Personal details
- Born: William Wyatt Bibb; October 2, 1781 Amelia County, Virginia
- Died: July 10, 1820 (aged 38) Elmore County, Alabama
- Resting place: Bibb Family Cemetery, Coosada, Alabama
- Party: Democratic-Republican
- Spouse: Mary Freeman (m. 1803)
- Education: College of William & Mary; University of Pennsylvania
- Profession: Physician

William Wyatt Bibb (October 2, 1781 – July 10, 1820) was a United States senator from Georgia, the first and only governor of the Alabama Territory, and the first governor of the U.S. state of Alabama. Bibb was a member of the Democratic-Republican Party and served as governor of Alabama until his death on July 10, 1820, from a horse riding accident. He is the first of only three people in U.S. history to be elected a U.S. Senator from one state and the governor of another. Bibb County, Alabama, and Bibb County, Georgia, are named for him.

== Early life ==
William Wyatt Bibb was born on October 2, 1781, in Amelia County, Virginia, to Captain William Bibb, an officer in the Continental Army during the American Revolutionary War (1775–1783) and a member of the state legislature, the General Assembly of the newly independent Commonwealth of Virginia, and his wife, Sally (Wyatt) Bibb.

Around 1784, Bibb Sr. moved with his family south to Georgia with a large number of Virginians who accompanied General George Mathews, hero of the Battle of Brandywine in Pennsylvania. Most of the general's followers were also veterans and, with their families, took advantage of the new nation's offer of land bounties in lieu of pay for former soldiers. They established tobacco farms on the rich lands around the confluence of the Broad and Savannah Rivers in newly developing northeastern Georgia. The Bibbs are recorded as one of the earliest pioneer families in Elbert County.

Bibb was probably privately educated before he went to the College of William & Mary in Williamsburg, Virginia, and the University of Pennsylvania School of Medicine in Philadelphia. He was awarded a Doctor of Medicine (M.D.) degree in 1801, returned to Georgia, and began to practice medicine in Petersburg. In 1803, he married Mary Freeman, the only daughter of Colonel Holman Freeman.

== Early political career ==
Bibb was elected to the Georgia House of Representatives in 1802 as a member at the age of 21. He took office in 1803 and served one two-year term. In 1806 he was elected as a Democratic-Republican to the Ninth session of the United States Congress to fill a vacancy caused by the resignation of Thomas Spalding, and was re-elected four times, serving until November 6, 1813.

As was then the practice, he was elected at that time by the state legislature to the US Senate to fill a vacancy created by the resignation of William H. Crawford, a nationally known presidential candidate. Bibb served until November 9, 1816.

As a Senator in 1816, Bibb opposed the first attempt to abolish the Electoral College and elect the president by popular vote, speaking very forthrightly about the advantages slave states derived from the Electoral College. He stated on the Senate floor that with Popular Vote, these states "would lose the privilege the Constitution now allows them, of votes upon three-fifths of their population other than freemen. It would be deeply injurious to them."

== Governor of Alabama ==
US President James Monroe appointed Bibb as the governor of the newly formed Alabama Territory (from the larger previous Mississippi Territory) in 1817. Alabama became the 22nd state on December 14, 1819. Governor Bibb was elected to continue as governor thereby becoming the first governor of the State of Alabama.

Bibb's primary duties were establishing the state government. Huntsville was designated to be the site of the constitutional convention. Bibb was elected governor by defeating Marmaduke Williams and receiving 8,342 votes to Williams's 7,140 votes. The capital was chosen to be the newly created town of Cahawba in 1820 on the Alabama frontier but moved to Tuscaloosa in 1826 and finally to the central city of Montgomery in 1846.

During Bibb's tenure, the Alabama state militia was established, and the beginnings of the state judicial system, along with the organization of and appointments to the Supreme Court of Alabama, were accomplished.

Henry Hitchcock was elected the first Attorney General of Alabama and initially held the position of Secretary of State of Alabama as well. However, shortly afterward, Thomas A. Rodgers was elected as the second Secretary of State of Alabama. The first session of the Alabama state legislature was held from October 25, 1819, to December 17, 1819. William R. King and John W. Walker were chosen as the state's first US Senators.

To date, Bibb is one of only three individuals to have served as governor of a state and as a US senator from a different state. The others are Sam Houston, who (among his other political offices) served as the sixth Governor of Tennessee and a US Senator from Texas (a state, like Alabama, which also had not existed when he held his governorship), and Mitt Romney, who served as the seventieth Governor of Massachusetts and a US Senator from Utah.

== Death ==
On July 10, 1820, Bibb was thrown from his horse during a violent thunderstorm, and died from internal injuries. He was 38 years old. His brother, Thomas Bibb, was president of the State Senate and filled out his term as governor.

William Bibb is buried in Coosada, Alabama. His likeness appears on the Alabama Centennial half dollar minted in 1921.

== See also ==
- George M. Bibb, relative of William

U.S. House of Representatives
Preceded by Thomas Spalding	Member of the U.S. House of Representatives from Georgia's at-large congressional district January 26, 1807 – November 6, 1813	Succeeded by Alfred Cuthbert
U.S. Senate
Preceded by William B. Bulloch	U.S. senator (Class 2) from Georgia; November 6, 1813 – November 9, 1816; Served alongside: Charles Tait	Succeeded by George Troup
Political offices
Preceded by (none)	Territorial Governor of Alabama; 1817–1819	Succeeded by Governor of Alabama
Preceded by Position established	Governor of Alabama; 1819–1820	Succeeded by Thomas Bibb
