= Thomas Bibb =

American politician (1783–1839)

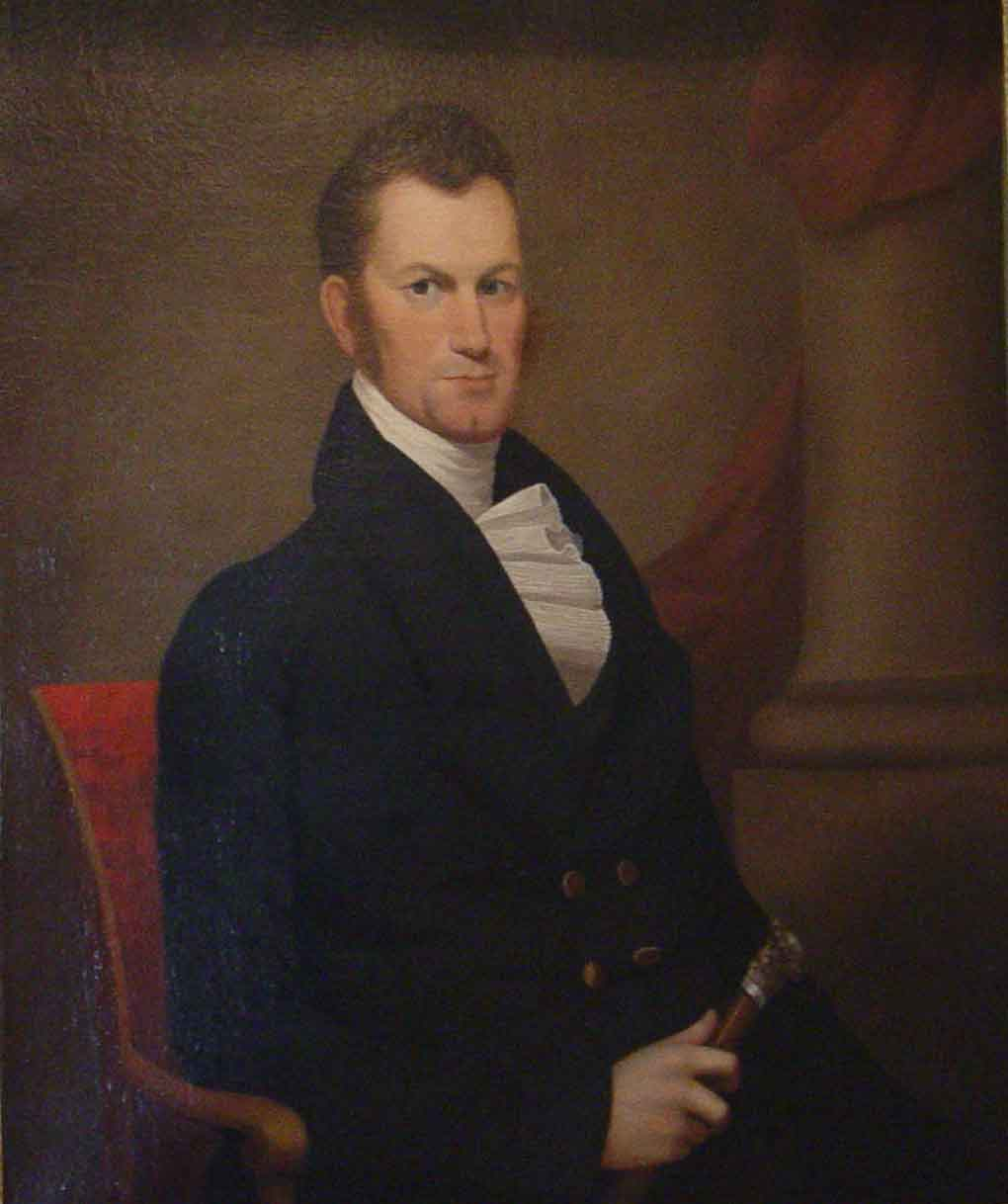

Member of the Alabama House of Representatives
- In office 1828–1830

2nd Governor of Alabama
- In office July 10, 1820 – November 9, 1821
- Preceded by: William Wyatt Bibb
- Succeeded by: Israel Pickens

President of the Alabama Senate
- In office 1819 – July 10, 1820

Alabama Senate
- In office 1819-July 10, 1820

Personal details
- Born: May 8, 1783 Amelia County, Virginia, US
- Died: September 20, 1839 (aged 56) Mobile, Alabama, US
- Resting place: Maple Hill Cemetery (Huntsville, Alabama)
- Party: Democratic-Republican
- Spouse: Parmelia Thompson
- Children: 11
- Profession: Politician

Thomas Bibb (May 8, 1783 – September 20, 1839) was the second governor of Alabama and served from 1820 to 1821.

He was the president of the Alabama Senate when his brother, Governor William Wyatt Bibb, died in office on July 10, 1820, as a result of a fall from a horse. By his senatorial office and under the state constitution, Thomas Bibb took over as governor for the remainder of his brother's term. He did not seek election as governor but later served in the Alabama House of Representatives.

He was born in Amelia County, Virginia, in 1783. He grew up in Georgia before he moved to what later became Alabama. He was married to Parmelia Thompson from 1809 to his death on September 20, 1839.

Bibb owned Belle Mina, a slave-labor farm and plantation house in Belle Mina, Alabama.

Political offices
Preceded by William Wyatt Bibb	Governor of Alabama; 1820–1821	Succeeded by Israel Pickens
