= Hugh McElderry =

Alabama lawyer and politician

Hugh Lawson White McElderry
- Portrait of Hugh McElderry, circa 1920

Mayor of Talladega, Alabama
- In office 1923–1925

President of the Talladega National Bank
- In office 1908–1918

Personal details
- Born: June 29, 1859 McElderry Station, Alabama, United States
- Died: November 4, 1931 (aged 72) Talladega, Alabama, United States
- Spouse: Ruthe Van Ausdal
- Parent: Thomas McElderry
- Occupation: Banker; Lawyer; Politician

Hugh Lawson White McElderry (June 29, 1859 – November 4, 1931) was an American banker, lawyer, and politician, who was mayor of Talladega, Alabama in the early 1920s. He was the son of Thomas McElderry, the founder of McElderry Station, Alabama. He was the President of the Talladega National Bank which later became the Regions Financial Corporation.

== Life and legacy ==
Hugh Lawson White McElderry was born in 1859 to Thomas McElderry and Martha-Ann Dozier. His father named him after Hugh Lawson White, a Tennessee politician. He was a lawyer and banker, living in Talladega, Alabama and he was also mayor of the town in the early 1920s. His profession as a banker led him to be the President of the Talladega National Bank which later became the Regions Financial Corporation. He died at his home in Talladega on November 4, 1931, aged 72. His house in the town, the McElderry-Malone Home which he and his wife built in 1905, still stands.
