= John T. Rather =

American politician, banker, and soldier

John Taylor Rather
- Portrait of Capt. John Rather, circa 1870; from family photo collection

Delegate from Morgan County to the Alabama Reconstruction Convention
- In office 1865–1865

Member of the Alabama State Senate
- In office 1835–1836

Board member of the State Bank of Alabama in Decatur
- In office 1833–1845

Member of the Alabama House of Representatives
- In office 1820–1835

Personal details
- Born: 14 March 1792 Prince Edward County, Virginia, United States
- Died: 3 January 1881 (aged 88) Tuscumbia, Colbert County, Alabama, United States
- Resting place: Somerville, Morgan County, Alabama
- Spouses: Barbra McClellan (1800–1826); Susan Roberts (1805–1854)
- Children: at least 1
- Occupation: Military Officer; Politician; Banker; Farmer

Military service
- Rank: Captain; Lieutenant
- Battles/wars: War of 1812; Creek War; Second Creek War; American Civil War

Captain John Taylor Rather (1792-1881) was an American politician, Banker, and soldier, who served in several conflicts during the nineteenth century. He also was a member of the Alabama State Senate and the Alabama House of Representatives.

== Early life and career ==
John Taylor Rather was born in 1792 in Virginia, to Daniel Rather (1763–1824) and Frances Taylor (1767–1822). He immigrated to the Territory of Alabama where he served as a local militia Captain in the War of 1812 and the Creek War. He later served in the Second Creek War and the American Civil War, all in local militia capacities.

== Later life and Legacy ==
Rather served in the Alabama House of Representatives, the Alabama State Senate, and the Alabama Reconstruction Convention. He also was a board member of the State Bank of Alabama in Decatur. He died in 1881 aged 88.

Circa 1880 from left to right: Br. Gen. William B. McClellan, age 83; Capt. John T. Rather, age 87; Col. Thomas McElderry, age 90; Gov. Reuben Chapman, age 79; from McElderry's families photo collection
