= Thomas McElderry =

American military officer and veteran of multiple U.S. wars

Col. Thomas McElderry
- Portrait of Col. Thomas McElderry, circa 1850; from family photo collection

Board member of the State Bank of Alabama in Decatur
- In office 1833–1845

Member of the Alabama House of Representatives From Morgan County
- In office Nov. 17, 1828 – Jan. 20, 1830
- Preceded by: John T. Rather
- Succeeded by: Daniel E. Hickman

Clerk of Court for Cotaco County
- In office 1826–1827
- In office 1819–1821

Overseer of the Poor for Cotaco County
- In office 1822–1823

Personal details
- Born: 18 January 1790 Leesburg, Loudoun County, Virginia, United States
- Died: 16 July 1883 (aged 93) McElderry Station, Talladega County, Alabama, United States
- Resting place: McElderry Family Cemetery, Talladega County, Alabama
- Citizenship: United States (1790–1861, 1865–1883); Confederate States (1861–1865)
- Party: Whig Party (United States), Democratic Party (United States)
- Spouses: Eliza Boteler (1804–1829); Frances Turner (1815–1846); Marth-Ann Dozier (1824–1906)
- Children: 12, including George McElderry, Capt. John S. McElderry, and Hugh McElderry
- Occupation: Politician; Military Officer; Lawyer; Colonist; Farmer
- Nickname: "Tom"

Military service
- Allegiance: United States of America; Tennessee; Alabama; Confederate States of America; Alabama
- Branch/service: Tenn. State Milita; United States Army; Alabama State Milita; Alabama Home Guard
- Years of service: 1812–1815; 1836–1837; 1861–1865
- Rank: Lieutenant (Tennessee State Militia); Captain (US Army); Lt. Colonel (Alabama Militia); Colonel (Confederate Home Guard)
- Unit: John Chile's Company, East Tennessee Militia Mounted Gunmen Jackson's Brigade United States Army, Reuben Tipton's Company, Tennessee Militia Mounted Gunmen, Coffee's Brigade United States Army; McClellan's Milita Company, Talladega Brigade, 25th Alabama Infantry Regiment, Confederate Home Guard
- Battles/wars: War of 1812; Tennessee and Natchez Trace Campaigns; Battle of Pensacola (1814); American Indian Wars; Creek War; Battle of Tallushatchee; Battle of Talladega; Battle of Horseshoe Bend (Tohopeka); Second Creek War; Destruction of Choccolocco & Tallasseehatchee Creek Indian Villages; American Civil War; Confederate Home Guard Defense of Alabama; Talladega Camp of Instruction

Colonel Thomas McElderry (1790-1883) was an American military officer, frontiersman, and politician whose lifetime spanned the early American republic through the Reconstruction era. He served alongside General Andrew Jackson and Brigadier General John Coffee, he was also one of the first white settlers in Talladega, Alabama and helped with the Indian Removal that occurred in Alabama during the 1810s through the 1830s. He served in several conflicts, including the War of 1812, The Creek War, and the American Civil War, receiving a pardon from Andrew Johnson. McElderry Station, Alabama is named for him.

Born in Virginia, he did what many men of that generation did and moved into the southwest of the United States into what is now Tennessee and Alabama during the early 19th century. The reason for this move was because of many factors, mainly the abundance of fertile soil and cheap land out west, as well as a population boom had made Virginia crowded for the time.

== Ancestry ==
He was born to American Revolutionary War veteran John McElderry and his wife Anna Sinclair. His father John was from Chester County Pennsylvania being born there in 1754. Thomas's paternal grandfather John McElderry born 1721, immigrated to Chester Pennsylvania from Ballymoney Ireland. His mother Ann was born in Loudoun Virginia in 1759 to John Sinclair and Sarah McDowell, the two of them being of English and Irish ancestry. He was a 4th great-grandson of Samuel Curtis (mayor) (1595–1653), an English gentlemen from Tenterden who was Mayor of Tenterden at various points during the early 17th Century.

== Military service ==
=== War of 1812 ===
McElderry served in the War of 1812 as a lieutenant in Captain Chile's company of the East Tennessee Militia mounted gunmen, as well as Captain Tipton's, joining in that same year. With the militia company, he conducted frontier fort garrison duties, supply wagon escorts, patrols, and support roles in larger main battle contingents against hostile Indians on the American frontier. Places he would have been during this time would include Fort Strother, Fort Armstrong (Alabama), and the Natchez Trace. After the Battle of Horseshoe Bend, Tipton and Chile's companies were moved to the Florida Panhandle to support the Battle of Pensacola (1814), and McElderry was with the company in that time.

=== The Creek War ===
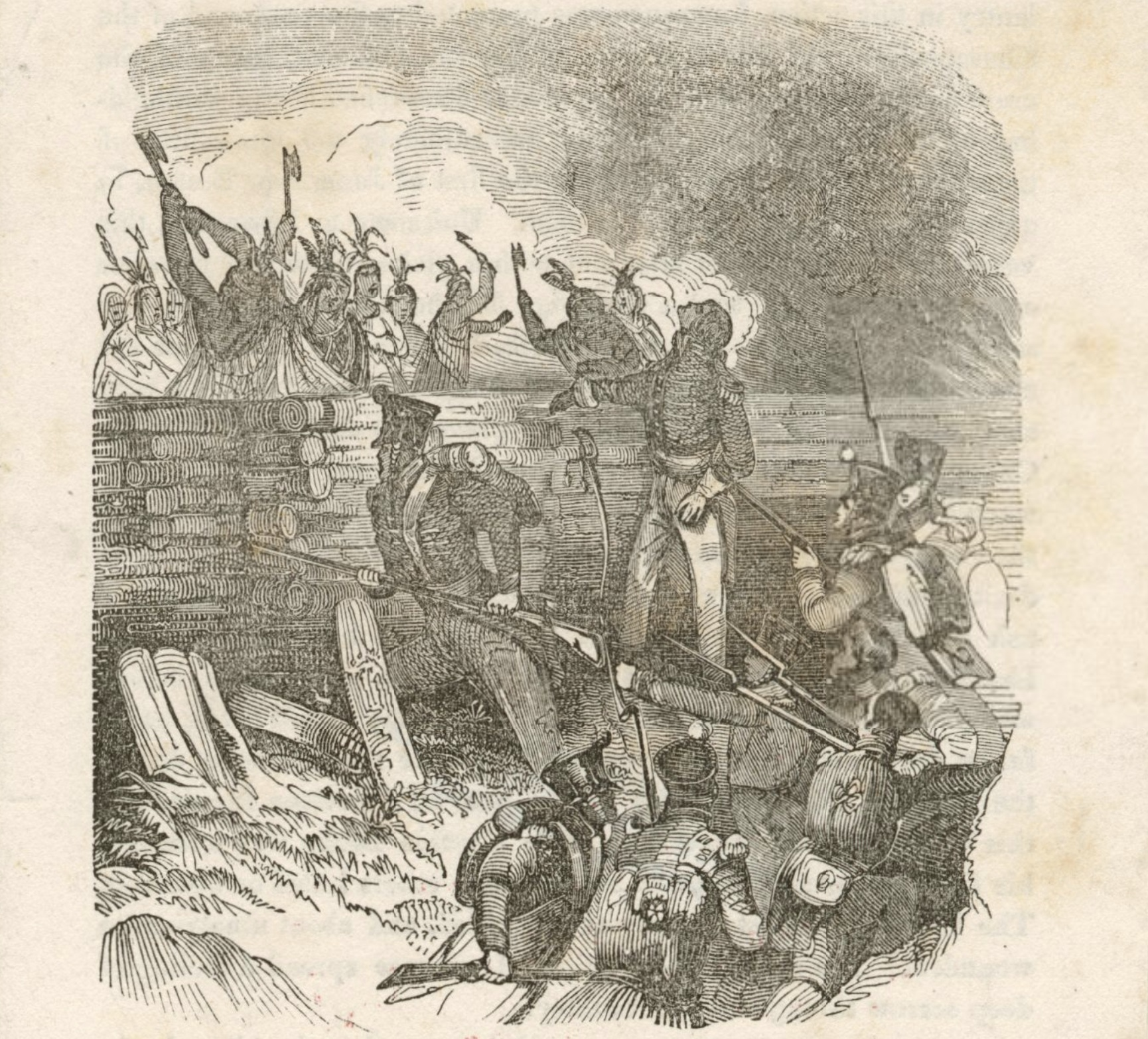
Battle of Horseshoe Bend, 1814

He fought in the Creek War against the Creek Nation and the Red Sticks where he served under then Major General Andrew Jackson and Gen. John Coffee. He fought at the Battle of Tallushatchee and the Battle of Talladega with Chile's unit of East Tennessee mounted gunmen and the Battle of Horseshoe Bend with Tipton's unit of Tennessee mounted gunmen. At the last two battles, his units were used by General Jackson in a wide envelopment of the enemy Creek forces, flanking them from behind and routing them, whereas at Tallushatchee, the cavalry gunmen McElderry was a part of completely surrounded a village and burned it to the ground, killing around 150 natives, Davy Crockett was also present for this battle. After the Battle of Horseshoe Bend Jackson's troops began to make bridle reins from the human skin taken off Indian corpses. They also conducted a body count by cutting off the tips of their noses. In all of this McElderry was present. For his service in the military, he became a Lt. Colonel in the army, and for his time spent with Andrew Jackson, McElderry received government sanctioned land, taken directly, and seceded by Selocta Chinnabby.

=== The Second Creek War ===
By the 1830's, McElderry was a senior local militia figure in his area of rural Alabama. Signing on as a Major, he participated in the final expulsion of the Creek Nation from Alabama from 1836 to 1837. He organized and commanded local militia units to enforce security and ensure protection of the community during the conflict. When General Winfield Scott arrived to expel the Creek once and for all, along side Opothleyahola and the loyalist Creeks, McElderry assisted the arriving U.S. troops in putting down any Creek resistance in the local area. This included the burning of the Creek villages in Choccolocco and Tallasseehatchee Creek.

=== The American Civil War ===
Circa 1880 Thomas McElderry; from family photo collection

In 1861 at the age of 71, Thomas McElderry came out of retirement and served as a Colonel for the Confederate States, commanding local reserve forces in Talladega and the surrounding areas under Brig. Gen. William Blount McClellan. In this role he worked with local militia which operated as part of the Confederate Home Guard. He also worked at the Talladega Camp of Instruction where he trained recruits. Several of his sons served along side him in the Confederate Army in the Army of Tennessee under General Joseph Wheeler. One of his sons, Capt. John S. McElderry, fell in the Battle of Varnell's Station in Georgia, on May 9, 1864, being shot trying to aide a wounded sergeant. After the American Civil War, he applied to President Abraham Lincoln for a pardon but the pardon was not received back until after Lincoln's death and President Andrew Johnson was in office.

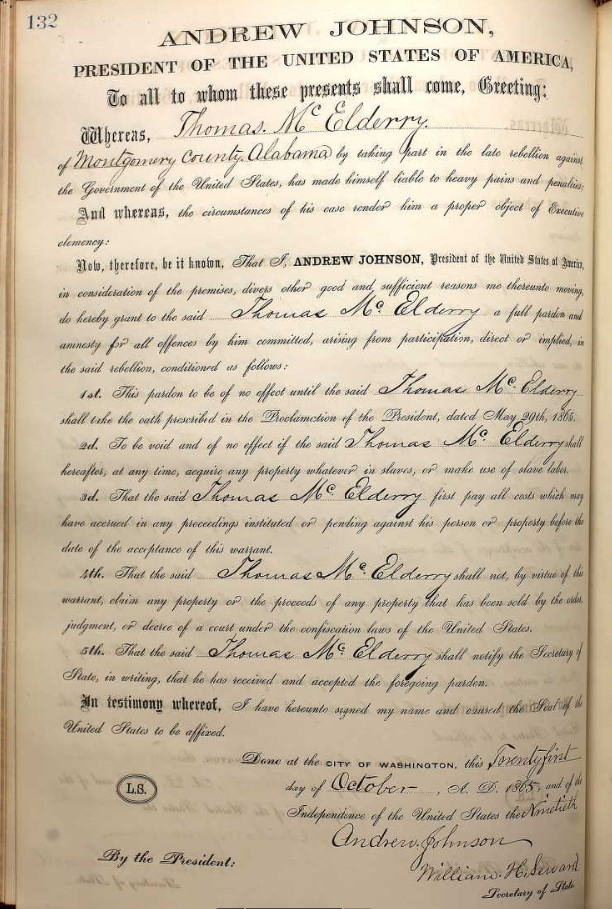
McElderry's Pardon from Andrew Johnson

== Political career ==
=== State House Representative ===
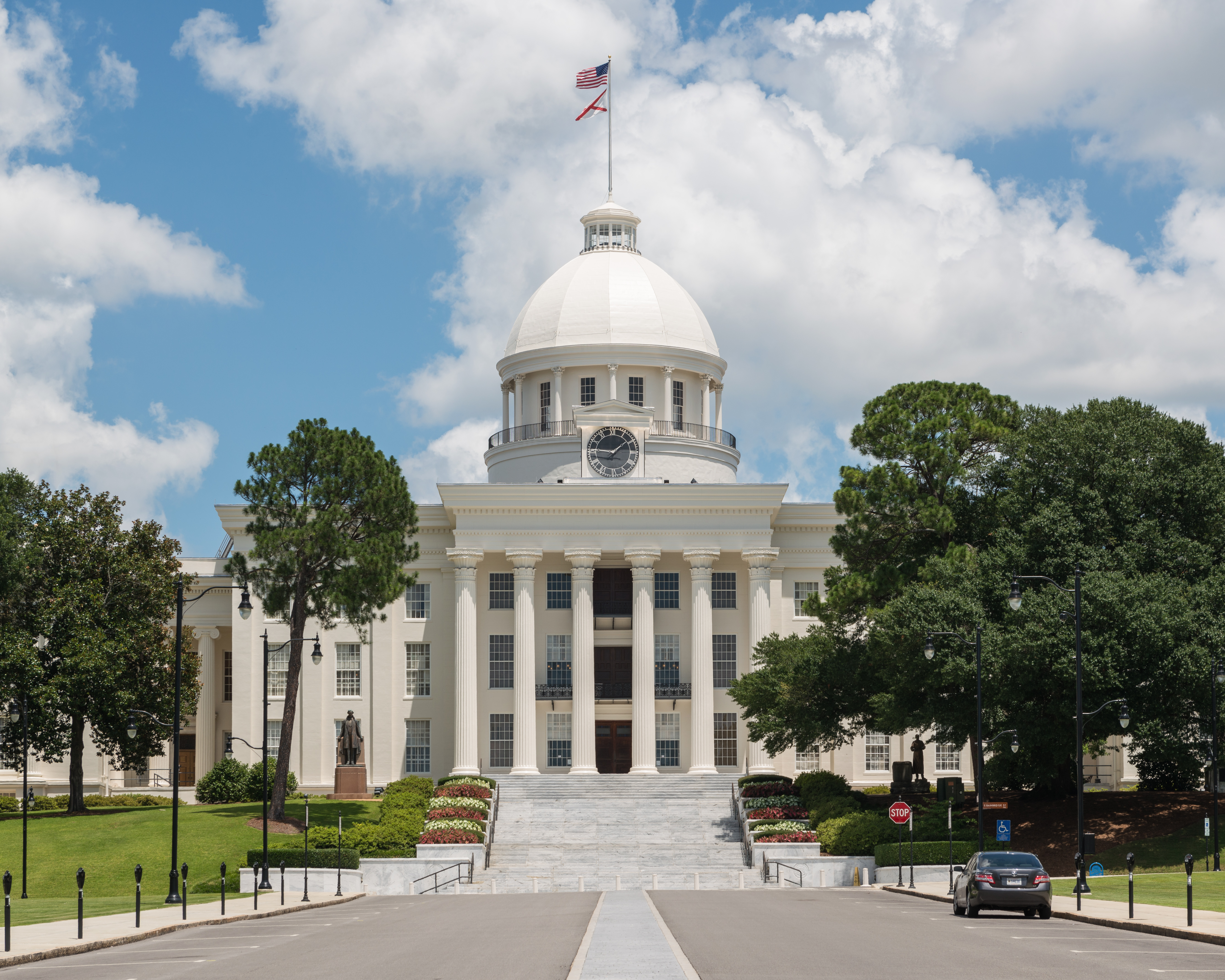
Alabama State Capitol Building

His first role was as Overseer of the Poor in Cotaco County, Alabama, and then he practiced law briefly and worked as a circuit clerk for the state in 1819 and 1826 before running for office the next year. Winning election, McElderry served as a state representative for Morgan County, Alabama, from 1828 to 1829. His friends and associates John T. Rather and Reuben Chapman also served with him in state government at this time. In his time as a representative in the state house, he helped oversee the state authority over native Creek land and saw the development of infrastructure as well as the building of the state capitol. Also, in his time in office, large parts of the State of Alabama were created from things like its modern county set up, its local judicial system and layout, and its state income tax system that it used to fund things like river navigation and government operations. He served at the same time as Governor John Murphy, Governor Samuel B. Moore, and James Innes Thornton.

== Later life and career ==
Circa 1880 from left to right: Br. Gen. William B. McClellan, age 83; Capt. John T. Rather, age 87; Col. Thomas McElderry, age 90; Gov. Reuben Chapman, age 79; from family photo collection

After the Creek War, McElderry settled in Chinnabee, a Creek town in present-day Talladega County, Alabama. He acquired land from Chief Chinnabee (Selocta Chinnabby), allowing the chief to continue residing in his log cabin on the property. In that time in the 1820s, he began a legal career and befriended then Alabama lawyer, Reuben Chapman and John T. Rather. They would go on to have a friendship and partnership spanning over 50 years and would support each other in their legal practices and careers. The three of them had in common that they were both men who had come to Alabama from the East and settled it, becoming among the first generation of the states local representatives. Also these men served as the board for the Old State Bank in Decatur Alabama as show in the picture above. His commanding officer, W.B. McClellan served with McElderry, Rather, and Chapman too. Returning home to Talladega he worked on his Plantation as well as attended veterans meetings as shown in the picture above. The land was later renamed from Chinnabee to McElderry. He died at age 93, having had 12 children with three wives (Eliza Boteler 1804–1829, Frances Turner 1815–1846, and Martha-Ann Dozier 1824–1906).
