= George Plowman =

George Plowman may refer to:

- George Plowman (architect) (1832–1903), American architect active in Philadelphia
- George H. Plowman (1840–1921), American Civil War soldier and recipient of the Medal of Honor
- George Paris Plowman (1808–1878), American politician and judge from Alabama
