= George McElderry =

American politician

George Thomas McElderry
- Portrait of George McElderry, circa 1880, from family photo collection

Delegate to the Alabama State Farmers Union
- In office 1910

Member of the Alabama House of Representatives
- In office 1888-1889

Personal details
- Born: 22 May 1854 Talladega County, Alabama
- Died: 29 November 1946 (aged 92) Talladega, Alabama
- Spouse: Mary Irion
- Children: 9
- Parent: Thomas McElderry
- Relatives: McElderry Family
- Occupation: Politician, Farmer, Business Owner

George Thomas McElderry was an American politician and business owner who served in the Alabama House of Representatives in the nineteenth century. He was the son of Thomas McElderry, an officer who served under General Andrew Jackson.

== Early life ==
George Thomas McElderry was born in 1854 to Thomas McElderry and his third wife, Martha Dozier. He married his wife, Mary Irion, in 1878, and the two had 9 children together.

== Career ==
George McElderry was a prominent local businessman, being involved with Stock breeding, Fertilizer, and owning a warehouse with a ginnery. He served as a representative to the Alabama House of Representatives in 1888 and later went on to be a delegate to the Alabama State Farmers Union. He also argued a case, (Isbell & Co. v. Lewis & Co., 98 Ala. 550), in the Alabama Supreme Court.

== Later life and death ==
George McElderry lived out his life in Talladega, Alabama, until his death in 1946.
