= AIDB =

AIDB may refer to:

- Alabama Institute for the Deaf and Blind
- Accountancy Investigation & Discipline Board
