= Silk Stockings (disambiguation) =

Silk Stockings is a 1955 stage musical.

Silk Stockings may also refer to:

- Silk Stockings (1920 film), a silent film with Keene Thompson
- Silk Stockings (1927 film), an American comedy film
- Silk Stockings (1957 film), a film adaptation of the 1955 musical
- Stockings made of silk.

== See also ==
- Silk Stalkings, a 1990s American TV crime series
- Silk Stocking District, a former nickname for the Upper East Side of Manhattan, New York City
- Silk Stocking District (Talladega), a neighborhood on the National Register of Historic Places listings in Talladega County, Alabama
- Silk Stocking Sal, a 1924 film directed by Tod Browning
