= William B. McClellan =

American banker and military officer (1798–1881)

William Blount McClellan
- Portrait of Brig. Gen. William B. McClellan, circa 1850; from family photo collection

Board Member & Director of the State Bank of Alabama in Decatur
- In office 1833–1845

Personal details
- Born: 22 January 1798
- Died: 11 October 1881 (aged 83) Talladega, Talladega County, Alabama, United States
- Resting place: Oak Hill Cemetery, Talladega County, Alabama
- Spouses: Martha Roby (1809-1858); Mary Stout (1820–1904)
- Children: 14
- Education: West Point
- Occupation: Military Officer; Lawyer; Banker; Farmer

Military service
- Rank: Lieutenant Colonel; Colonel (CSA Army); Brigadier General (Militia)
- Battles/wars: Second Creek War; American Civil War; Battle of Shiloh; Battle of Murfreesboro; Battle of Chickamauga; Battle of Atlanta; Battle of Bentonville

William Blount McClellan (1798–1881) was an American banker, military officer, and farmer who served in the American Civil War. McClellan was a Brigadier General in Alabama, commanding local militia in Talladega County, Alabama.

== Life and career ==
William McClellan was born in 1798 to Col. John McClellan (1768–1842) and Mary Wallace (1774–1857). He was an early settler of Alabama and was a founder, board member, and Director of the State Bank of Alabama in Decatur. He was a graduate of West Point in the 1810s. He commanded local militia units during the Second Creek War and during the American Civil War. McClellan also served as a Lieutenant Colonel for the 25th Alabama Infantry, seeing several battles. In his life, McClellan held several personal relationships with other local bankers and military leaders, such as Thomas McElderry, John T. Rather, and Reuben Chapman.

Circa 1880 from left to right: Br. Gen. William B. McClellan, age 83; Capt. John T. Rather, age 87; Col. Thomas McElderry, age 90; Gov. Reuben Chapman, age 79; from McElderry's families photo collection

== Death and legacy ==
McClellan died in 1881, aged 83, leaving behind 14 children, and his historic home, Ildewild Plantation which is listed on the U.S. National Register of Historic Places.
