= East Alabama Masonic Female Institute =

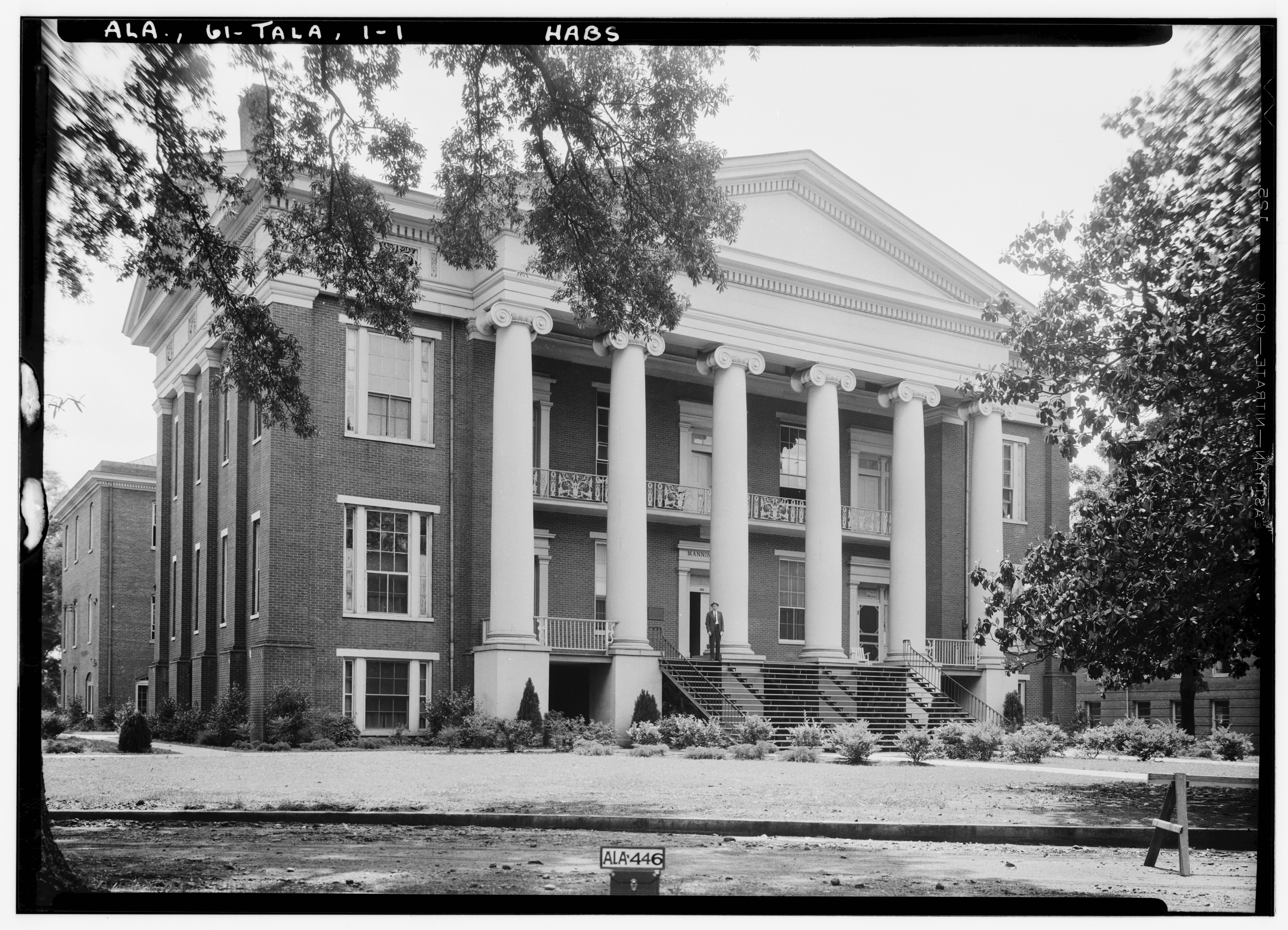
East Alabama Masonic Female Institute (1935)

East Alabama Masonic Female Institute was an American girls' school in Talladega, Alabama. It was established in February 1851 by Freemasons. By 1858, it had ceased to exist, its building having been rented to the Alabama Institute for the Deaf and Blind.

== History ==
This institution was founded under the auspices of Clinton Lodge, No. 38, aided by the liberality of Brethren of sister Lodges, and others, not of the Fraternity, but friendly to the mission. It was essentially a Masonic undertaking. Its President and Board of Trustees were required to be Master Masons, and its friends looked mainly to the Masonic Fraternity for the support necessary to sustain it. W. C. Hill, Esq., served as the initial Secretary of the board of trustees.

The first term commenced in February 1851.

== Grounds and architecture ==
The institution was located at 205 East South Street, Talladega, Talladega County, Alabama. Nearly US$20,000 were expended on the edifice and grounds, the principal part of which sum was contributed by Clinton Lodge, and members of the Fraternity. The edifice was a large brick building, having 27 rooms. It was situated on an eminence commanding a view of varied landscape. The grounds were spacious, affording ample room for exercise in either riding or walking.

== Instruction ==
There were Primary and Collegiate departments. The board of instruction consisted of a President (who was the Professor of ancient and modern languages); a professor of natural and moral science, and mathematics; an instructor in the preparatory department; a professor of music, with a female assistant; and a female teacher in drawing, painting, and ornamental needlework. Competent lecturers on chemistry and electro-magnetism, were also employed.
