= Old State Bank (Decatur, Alabama) =

- State Bank Building, Decatur Branch
- U.S. National Register of Historic Places
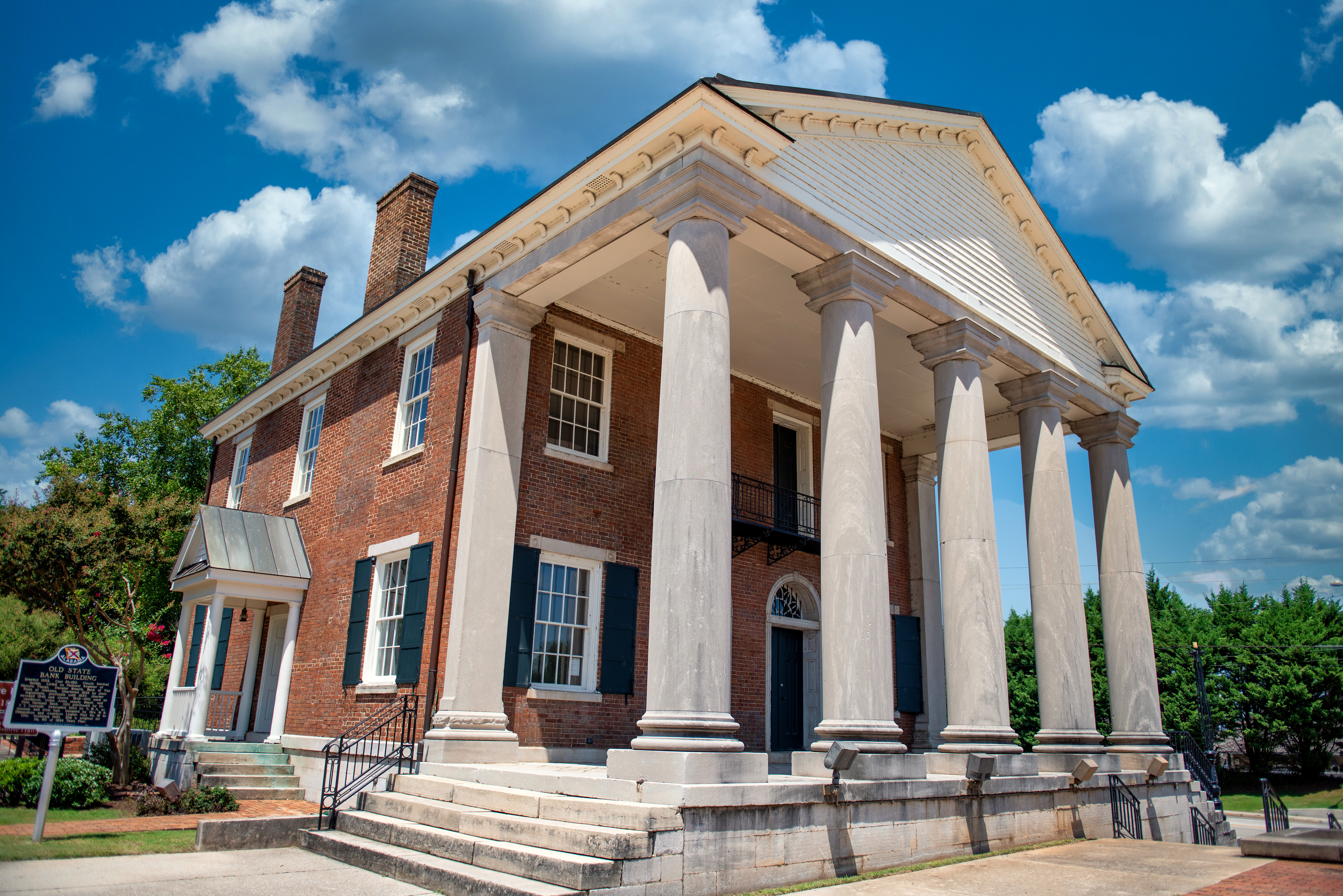
- Location: 925 Bank St., NE, Decatur, Alabama
- Coordinates: 34°36′52″N 86°59′1″W
- Built: 1833
- Architect: unknown
- Architectural style: Jeffersonian
- NRHP reference No.: 72000176
- Added to NRHP: March 24, 1972

The State Bank Building, Decatur Branch, commonly known as the Old State Bank, is a historic Jeffersonian-style bank building in Decatur, Alabama, United States. It was recorded by the Historic American Buildings Survey in 1934 and 1935. It was added to the National Register of Historic Places on March 24, 1972, due to its architectural significance.

== History ==
Former Board Members of the Bank, gathered for a picture on the front steps of the building, Circa 1880 from left to right: Br. Gen. William B. McClellan, age 83; Capt. John T. Rather, age 87; Col. Thomas McElderry, age 90; Gov. Reuben Chapman, age 79; from Tom McElderry's families photo collection

The Decatur branch of the Alabama State Bank opened its doors on July 29, 1833. It was authorized by the Alabama General Assembly in 1830 to be one of three branches of the Alabama State Bank. After outstanding debts of over $1 million were unable to be reformed the Decatur branch franchise was revoked. The building remained vacant until the 1860s when it was one of four buildings that survived the Civil War in Decatur, Alabama. During the Battle of Decatur, the bank was used as headquarters for the Union forces in the area and was also used as a hospital while battles raged outside.

In 1881, the First National Bank opened its doors in the Old State Bank building. But, when First National Bank completed its new office in 1902, the bank building was used as a residence and office by J. Y. Cantwell. After signs of deterioration began to show themselves, Cantwell's grand niece, W. B. Edmundson, deeded the building over to the City of Decatur in 1933. Management of the structure was vested in an eight-member Board of Governors. The petition for restoration was presented to the Civil Works Administration and restoration commenced. Being one of only a handful of local buildings to survive the destruction of the American Civil War, and after going through the many changes over the years, the Old State Bank has become a symbol of historical significance.

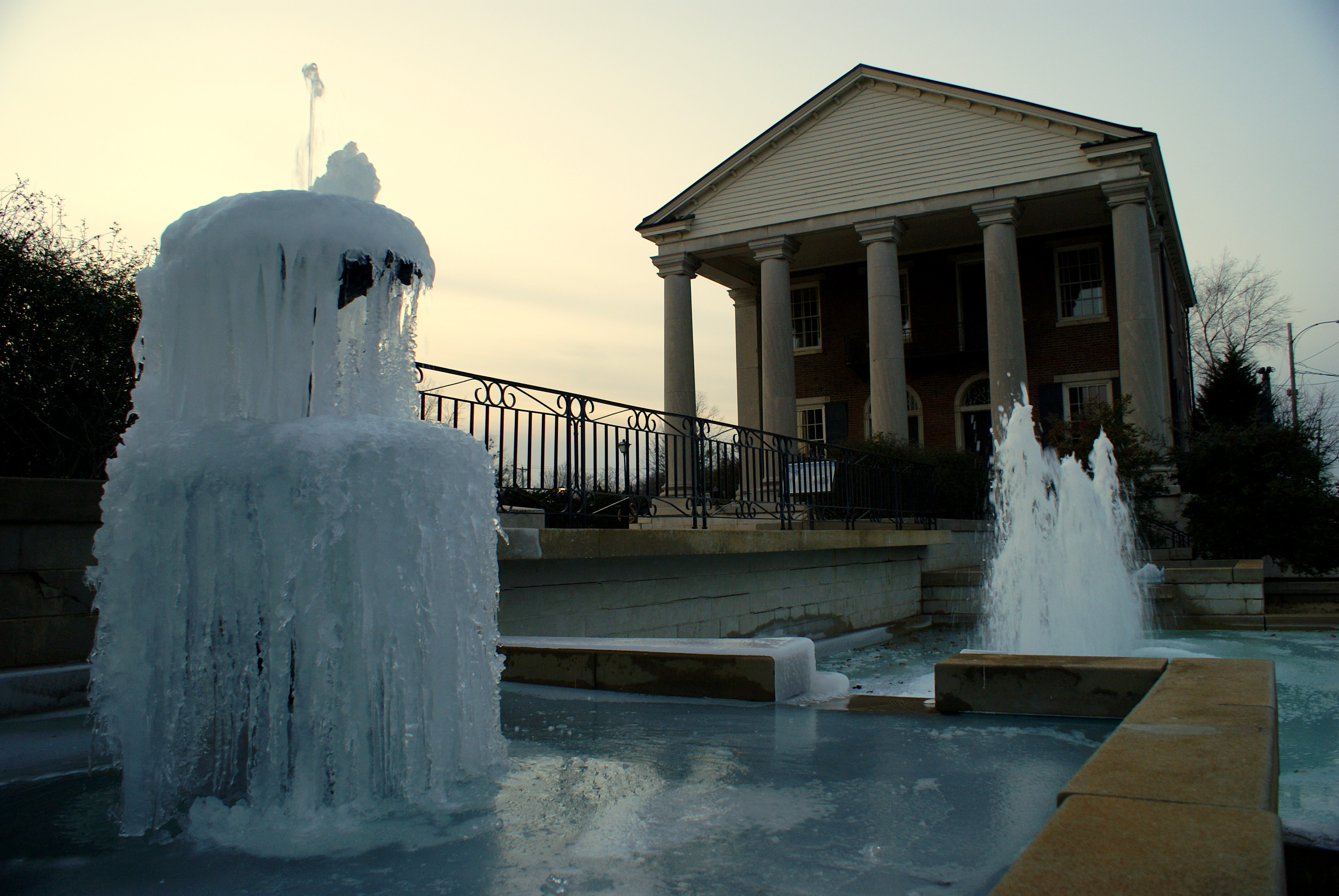
The fountains in front of the Old State Bank frozen in winter 2008.

In 1972, the Old State Bank was named to the National Register of Historical Places at the age of 139 years. Three years later, in 1975, the American Legion, Post No. 15, donated the Old State Bank building to the City of Decatur. Plans for restoration were put together in the year 1976, as the bank turned 143 years old, and was put under the control of the Old Bank Board members. Restoration of the bank was finished in the year 1983, at the age of 150. In 1984, a curator was appointed, and daily tours were implemented. The second wave of detailed restoration was undertaken in the years of 1995-1996 and was led by noted preservation architect, Harvie Jones. Funding was provided by the Alabama Historical Commission, the City of Decatur, and the Old Bank Board of Directors. The City of Decatur commemorated the bank's 175th anniversary in 2008.

== Architecture ==
The architecture of the bank shows the influence of Thomas Jefferson's fusion of Palladianism with Roman temple forms. The five limestone columns across the front weigh 100-150 tons each and were mined in nearby Trinity. The pentastyle portico is highly unusual.

== See also ==
- National Register of Historic Places listings in Morgan County, Alabama
