= Idlewild (Talladega County, Alabama) =

Historic house in Alabama, United States

- U.S. National Register of Historic Places
- U.S. Historic district
- Alabama Register of Landmarks and Heritage
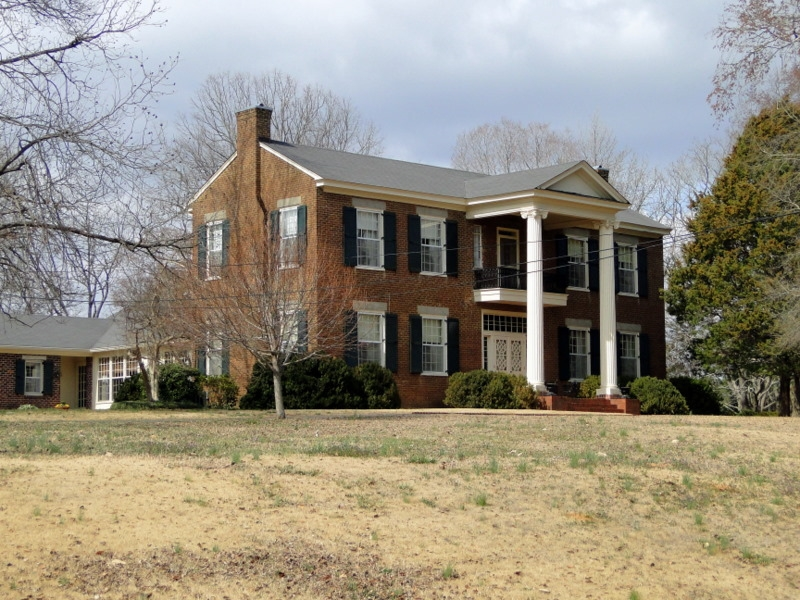
- Idlewild in 2010

- Location within Alabama Location within the United States
- Nearest city: Talladega, Alabama
- Coordinates: 33°28′15″N 86°2′53″W
- Area: 14 acres (5.7 ha)
- Built: 1843
- Architectural style: Greek Revival
- NRHP reference No.: 93001012

Significant dates
- Added to NRHP: October 15, 1993
- Designated ARLH: March 19, 1993

Idlewild is a historic Greek Revival plantation house and historic district just east of Talladega, Alabama, United States, built by William B. McClellan. The property was added to the Alabama Register of Landmarks and Heritage and the National Register of Historic Places in 1993, due to its architectural significance.

== History ==
After settling with his family in Talladega County, just east of the city of Talladega, William B. McClellan established the plantation of Idlewild and built the house that stands today in 1829. The 1860 United States census records him as having 46 African slaves.

William B. McClellan was born on January 22, 1798, in Knox County, Tennessee, and died on October 11, 1881, in Talladega County, Alabama. He married Martha Thompson Roby (b. November 18, 1809, Georgia, d. January 30, 1858, Talladega County, Alabama) on June 30, 1825, and together they had 16 children. William B. McClellan was a graduate of West Point, a brigadier-general of local Alabama militia, and later a colonel in the Confederate States Army.

In 1945, the Turner Jones family bought the property and updated it for modern use, preserving its important features.

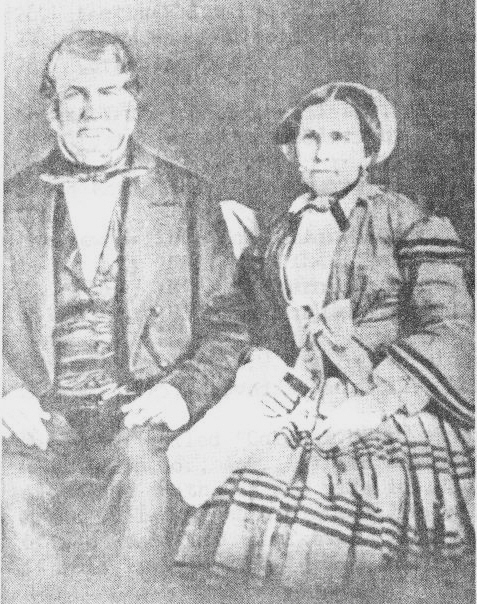
William B. McClellan and wife Martha, plantation owners
