= Samuel Curtis (mayor) =

English mayor and gentlement

Magistrate in Kent
- In office 1630–1653

Mayor & Bailiff of Tenterden
- In office 1648–1648
- In office 1637–1637
- In office 1627–1627

Personal details
- Born: 1595 Tenterden, England
- Died: 1653 (aged 57–58) Tenterden, England
- Spouse: Martha Porter
- Children: 3
- Occupation: Gentlemen; Mayor; Magistrate

Samuel Curtis was an English merchant and Mayor in Tenterden, England during the seventeenth century. He was also a Juror for the town, as well as a magistrate in Kent.

== Life & Legacy ==
Samuel Curtis or Curteis was born in 1595 to Stephen Curtis (1560–1643) and Elizabeth Short (1575–1643) in Tenterden. His father was also mayor of Tenterden, as well as his grandfather, William Curtis. He served several roles in Kent during his lifetime, including Mayor, Bailiff, Juror, Magistrate, and as a gentlemen merchant. He died in 1653 at age 57–58. His 4th great-grandson is Thomas McElderry.
