= Miss Willie's House =

Historic house in Alabama, United States

- Dr. Samuel Welch House
- U.S. Historic district – Contributing property
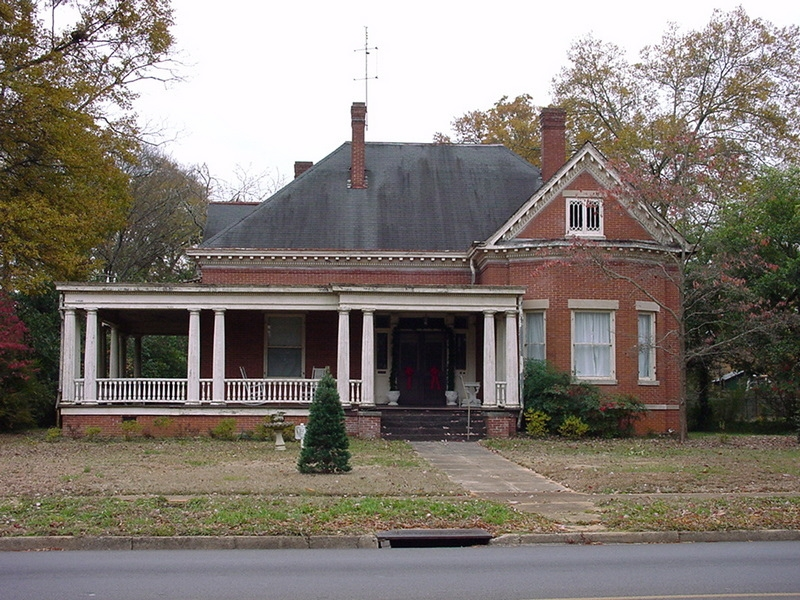
- Welch House in 2011

- Location within Alabama
- Location: Talladega, Alabama
- Coordinates: 33°25′54″N 86°5′54″W
- Built: 1907
- Architectural style: Queen Anne
- Part of: Silk Stocking District (Talladega) (ID79000403)

Miss Willie's House, also known as the Dr. Samuel Welch House, is a historic brick Queen Anne-style house in Talladega, Alabama, USA. It was built by Dr. Samuel W. Welch and his wife, Ethel, in 1907. Upon the deaths of Dr. Welch and his wife, the house passed to their daughter, Miss Willie Wallace Welch, who lived in the house until her death in 1997. The house is a contributing property to the "Silk Stocking District", a historic district designated in 1979 by the National Register of Historic Places in Talladega County.

== History ==
The house was designed by renowned architect Frank Lockwood of Montgomery, Alabama, and built by contractor Robert S. West, of Talladega. This duo collaborated on many of Talladega's historic homes and buildings. Dr. Welch served as the State Health Officer for Alabama and spent much of his career addressing health and medical issues across the State. He was also a Mason and an Odd Fellow. Miss Willie Welch was a lifelong bachelorette, a local historian, and was employed by the Talladega Public Library for over 30 years.

== Description ==
The Welch Home is one of only three solid brick houses in Talladega County, the walls being double-brick (8" thick). It features three bay windows and 17 Grecian columns along the wraparound porch. Although the house is a single-story house, the roof was built tall and steep in case the attic was ever converted to living space. The floor plan is divided by a wide central hallway with rooms on each side. The extra-wide hallway was built to accommodate a staircase at the rear for access to the attic. Two of the four interior fireplaces feature French enameled mantles.

At the time of construction, neither gas nor electric lines had been installed in the neighborhood, so the house was both wired for electric lighting and piped for gas lighting. Electric lines reached the neighborhood first, so electric light fixtures were purchased for the house. The gas pipes and fittings can still be seen in each room today.
