= J. L. M. Curry House =

Historic house in Alabama, United States

- U.S. National Register of Historic Places
- U.S. National Historic Landmark
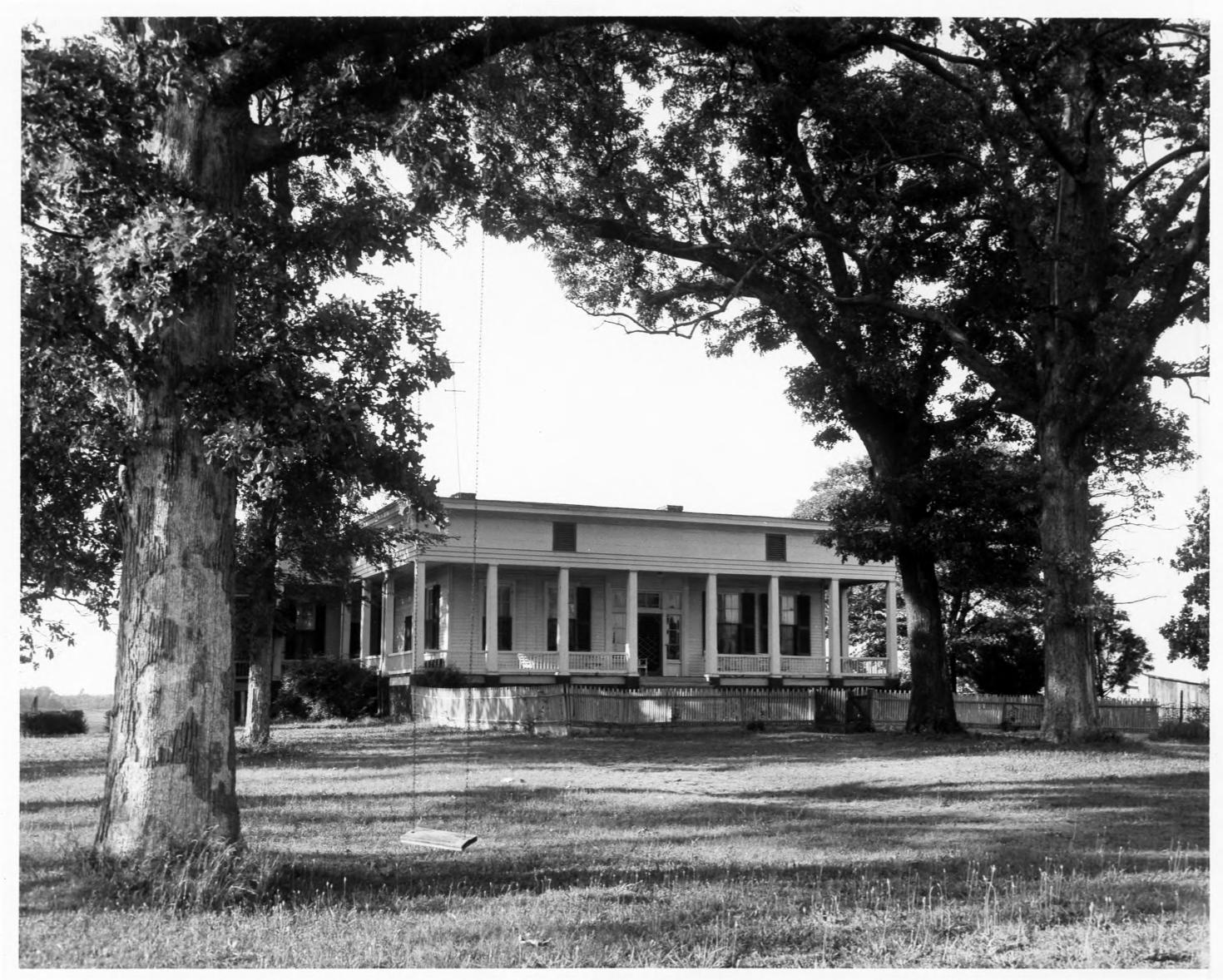
- The J. L. M. Curry House near Talladega.

- Location within Alabama Location within the United States
- Location: Talladega, Alabama
- Coordinates: 33°27′17″N 86°3′6″W
- Area: 760.5 acres (307.8 ha)
- Built: c. 1850
- Built by: Jackson Curry
- Architectural style: Greek Revival
- NRHP reference No.: 66000154

Significant dates
- Added to NRHP: October 15, 1966
- Designated NHL: December 21, 1965

The J. L. M. Curry House is a historic house and farm property near Talladega, Alabama. It was the home of Jabez Lamar Monroe Curry (1825–1903), a lawyer, politician, and educator who "did more than any one other man to encourage the expansion and improvement of the public school system and the establishment of training schools for teachers throughout the south. He was also largely responsible for convincing Southern legislators of the states' responsibility for public education." The house and surrounding farm was declared a National Historic Landmark in 1965.

== Description and history ==
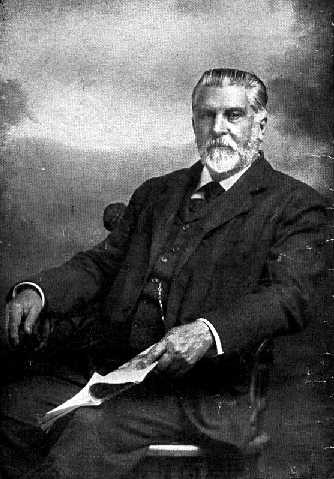
Jabez Lamar Monroe Curry

The J.L.M. Curry House is located about 3 miles (4.8 km) east of the center of Talladega, on the east side of Alabama State Route 21. It is a single-story wood-frame structure, roughly T-shaped, with wings extending to the sides and rear. Its front is defined by a full-width porch topped by a boxy parapet that obscures the gabled roof. The interior is simply finished, with modest vernacular trim. One room, which served as J.L.M. Curry's office, is lined with bookshelves.

The exact date of construction of the house is unknown. It was moved to this location about 1850, after Jabez Curry purchased it from his brother Jackson, the likely builder. The farm, then about 1,100 acres (450 ha) (now reduced to about 760 acres (310 ha)), served as Curry's home until 1865. Curry, a Georgia native educated at Harvard Law School, served in the state legislature and Congress prior to the American Civil War, during which he served in the Confederate Army. In 1881 he was chosen to serve as the southern agent for the Peabody Education Fund and in 1889 as an agent for the Slater Fund. Both of these charitable funds were established for the purpose of improving educational resources in the South during the post-Civil War period. As their agent, Curry was instrumental in the establishment of normal schools for teacher training, and for the establishment of new school networks across the south.

The former Curry property is privately owned.

== See also ==
- List of National Historic Landmarks in Alabama
- National Register of Historic Places listings in Talladega County, Alabama
