= Alabama Institute for the Deaf and Blind =

Coordinates: 33°25′26″N 86°7′18″W

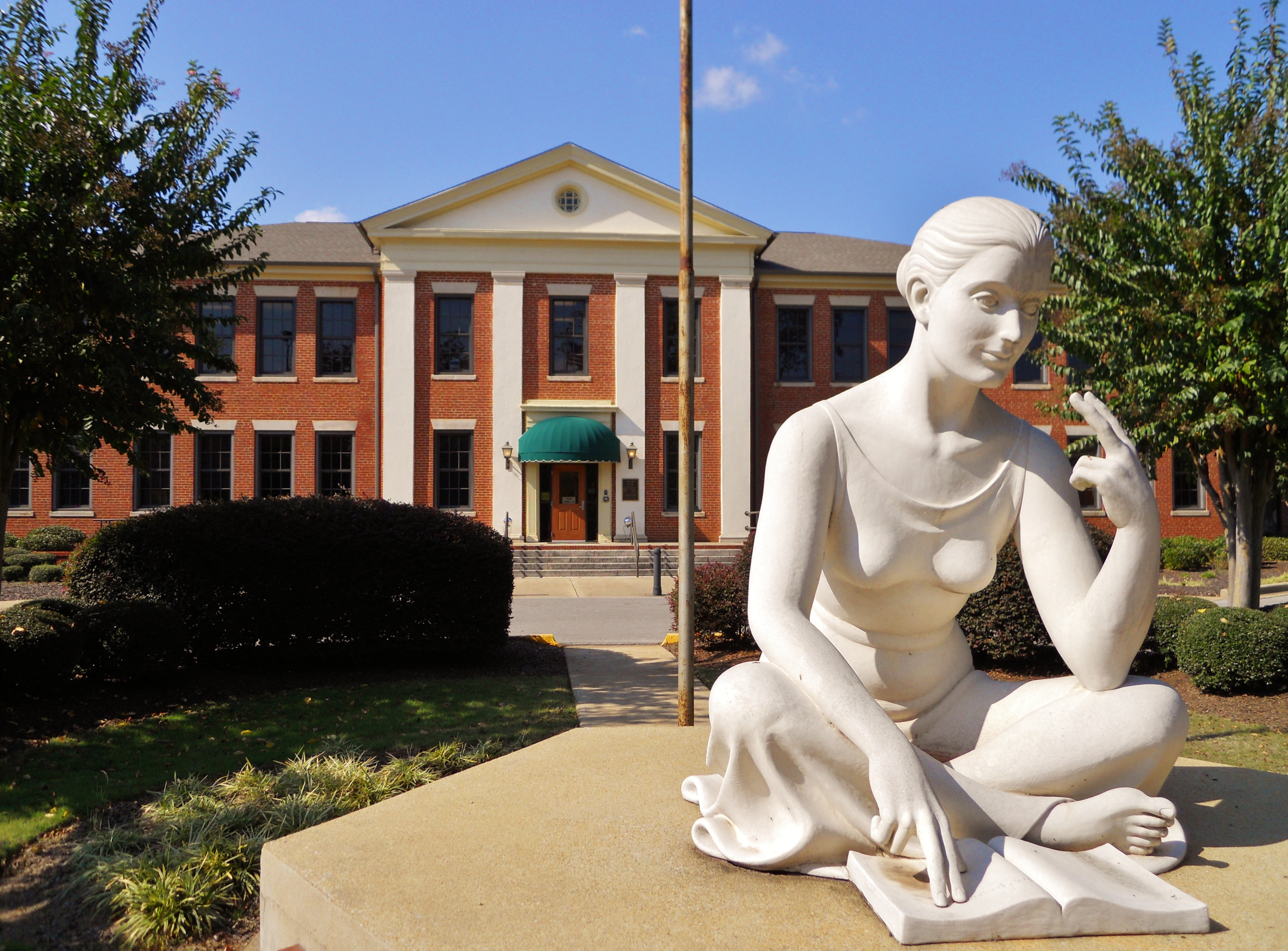

Location
- 205 South St E Talladega, Alabama; United States

Information
- Established: 1858
- President: Dennis Gilliam, Ed.D.
- Colors: Red and White
- Mascot: The School for the Deaf - "Silent Warriors"; The School for the Blind - "Red Wolves"; Helen Keller School of Alabama - "Eagles"
- Website: www.aidb.org

The Alabama Institute for Deaf and Blind (AIDB) is a school for those who are deaf, blind, deafblind, and multidisabled. It is operated by the U.S. state of Alabama in the city of Talladega. The current institution includes the Alabama School for the Deaf, the Alabama School for the Blind, and the Helen Keller School of Alabama, named for Alabamian Helen Keller, which serves children who are both deaf and blind. E. H. Gentry Facility provides vocational training for adult students, and the institution offers employment through its Alabama Industries for the Blind facilities in Talladega and Birmingham. AIDB has regional centers in Birmingham, Decatur, Dothan, Huntsville, Mobile, Montgomery, Opelika, the Shoals, Talladega, and Tuscaloosa. AIDB currently serves over 36,000 residents from all 67 counties of the state.

== History ==
The institution was formed at the suggestion of Joseph Henry Johnson, a former instructor at the Georgia School for the Deaf in Cave Spring. He left that school in 1858 and corresponded with Alabama Governor Andrew B. Moore and State Superintendent of Education William Perry about opening a similar facility in the neighboring state. He purchased the East Alabama Masonic Female Institute property in Talladega and opened the Alabama School for the Deaf on October 4 of that same year. The state purchased the property from him in 1860, but kept him on as president.

In April 1867, Johnson's brother-in-law, Reuben Rogers Asbury, who had suffered an eye injury during the American Civil War, lobbied the state's Reconstruction legislature for funds to add a school for the blind, with himself as teacher. The funding was approved in 1870, and the combined institutions were renamed the Alabama Institute for the Deaf, Dumb and Blind. The school then served about 70 students. As it grew, it was split again into separate schools in 1887. Josiah Graves took over the Alabama Academy for the Blind and Johnson stayed on as head of the School for the Deaf. In 1892, Alabama founded the Alabama School for Negro Deaf-Mutes (later the Alabama School for the Negro Deaf and Blind) nearby, with Graves serving as principal.

The schools taught music, math, religion and home economics as well as vocational programs such as farming and trades. Athletic programs in baseball, basketball, and American football were also offered, with the deaf teams going by the name "Silent Warriors". In the late 1870s, a student-run newspaper, The Messenger, published its first edition. The Gospel group, The Blind Boys of Alabama, got their start at the Institute for Negro Blind in 1939.

Johnson's son, Henry Jr., took over at his death. Under his tenure a bakery, model farm and hospital were added, as well as programs for adults with visual impairments. Eugene A. McBride took over as president in 1955 and opened the Helen Keller school (which educated the first deaf and blind student to receive a General Equivalency Diploma). He oversaw the construction of much of the present campus and expanded the institute's outreach to adults, culminating in the vocational center named for his successor, Euel H. Gentry. The Alabama Industries for the Blind has been the sole supplier of neck ties for the United States Armed Forces since the 1960s. In 2006 it also began producing combat helmet covers and ink jet printer cartridges.

The parallel schools were integrated in 1968 following the lawsuit Christine Archie v. AIDB. Under President Jack Hawkins in the 1980s, an AIDB Foundation was created to provide additional financial support for the growing institution. A grant from the W. K. Kellogg Foundation helped underwrite the creation of regional centers around the state. The current president is Dennis Gilliam, Ed.D.

== Campus ==
The Helen Keller School has Horton Hall with separate wings for female and male students, Elliott Cottages for older students, and Alfa-Daniels and the Independent Living House and Apartments for the oldest female and male students, respectively. As of 2020 Alfa-Daniels, built in 2006, was the newest constructed dormitory.
