= Reconstruction in Alabama =

Period of U.S. military occupation and government of Alabama (1863-1877)

During the Reconstruction era, Alabama was put under U.S. military rule. A constitutional convention was held. Enslavement of African Americans ended and the federal Reconstruction Acts enshrined their basic civil and political rights. African Americans were elected to state and local offices and others were appointed to public offices. Public school systems were established including schools and colleges for African Americans.

There were hardships after the war for both Whites and Blacks. Economic disruption and social change led to unrest in various parts of the state. Many Confederate soldiers and their supporters sought the restoration of White supremacy and Democratic Party rule. For many within Deep South Alabama, the time of reconstruction was a time of civil unrest and political battles leading up to and following the reunification of Alabama into the Union.

== Background to the American Civil War ==
Differences over the acceptability of human slavery as well differences over various political matters in the United States eventually led to the American Civil War. An ethical and religious awakening caused many people in the North to campaign against slavery. Many believed enslaving people was Christian hypocrisy and thought it hindered the spread of Christianity. While northern Republicans fought for ideals including abolition, equality under the law, and democracy, southern Whites in the Confederacy fought to protect their way of life, as many of their economic and social systems were built upon the institution of slavery.

The North, with better access to resources due to a manufacturing economy, eventually succeeded in occupying the South and winning the Civil War. It also benefitted from the some 200,000 freed Blacks who joined the Union Army.

When the North and South reunified into a single Union, legislative measures were taken to end slavery and give rights of citizenship and franchise to former-slaves or Freedmen. This is often referred to as Reconstruction and was focused on creating and keeping African Americans' legal rights, specifically in the South. Like the other formerly confederate states, Alabama was forced to adopt Reconstruction. The government and people of Alabama faced unique challenges associated with deeply rooted prejudice and new national law.

== Policy ==
=== National Policy ===
Leading up to the end of the Civil War, the United States passed three amendments to end slavery and grant basic rights of citizenship to African Americans. The thirteenth amendment made slavery and involuntary servitude (with the exception of legal punishment) illegal. The fourteenth amendment defined the terms of citizenship as anyone being born in the United States, therefore extending citizenship to former-slaves. The fifteenth amendment extended the franchise to all, making it illegal to withhold the vote from anyone on the basis of race. While these amendments aimed to create greater equality among men, they failed to alleviate gender discrimination and inequality.

The Civil War was fought almost entirely in the South and the southern states of the Confederacy were faced with the difficulties of rebuilding a war-devastated economic, political, and social landscape. Many people in South (along with some federal political leaders) expected life after reunification to be relatively the same as before the war. Andrew Johnson, who was sympathetic to this mindset, was impeached from the presidency due to his failure to act progressively for the rights of Blacks. Following his impeachment, the northern-run United States passed a series of legislations designed to integrate Blacks and give them political rights and standing. This time period is generally known as Reconstruction and lasted between the end of 1863 and 1877.

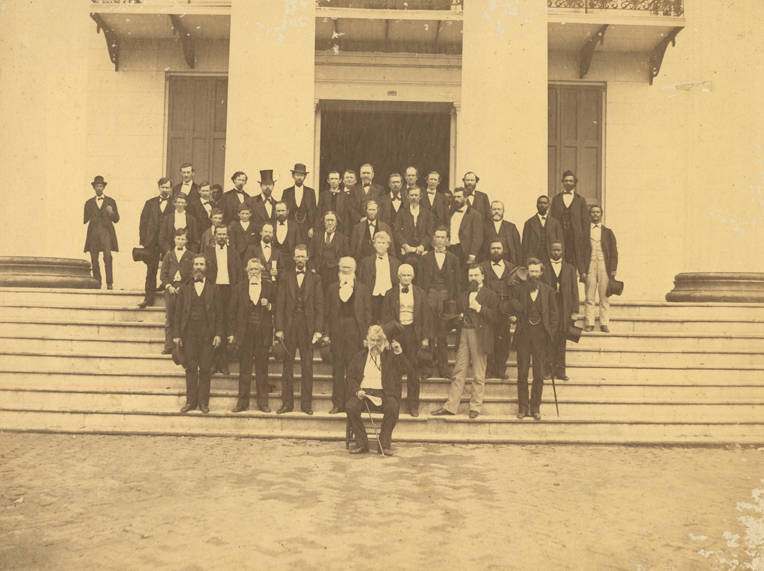
Alabama State Legislature following Reconstruction

=== State Policy ===
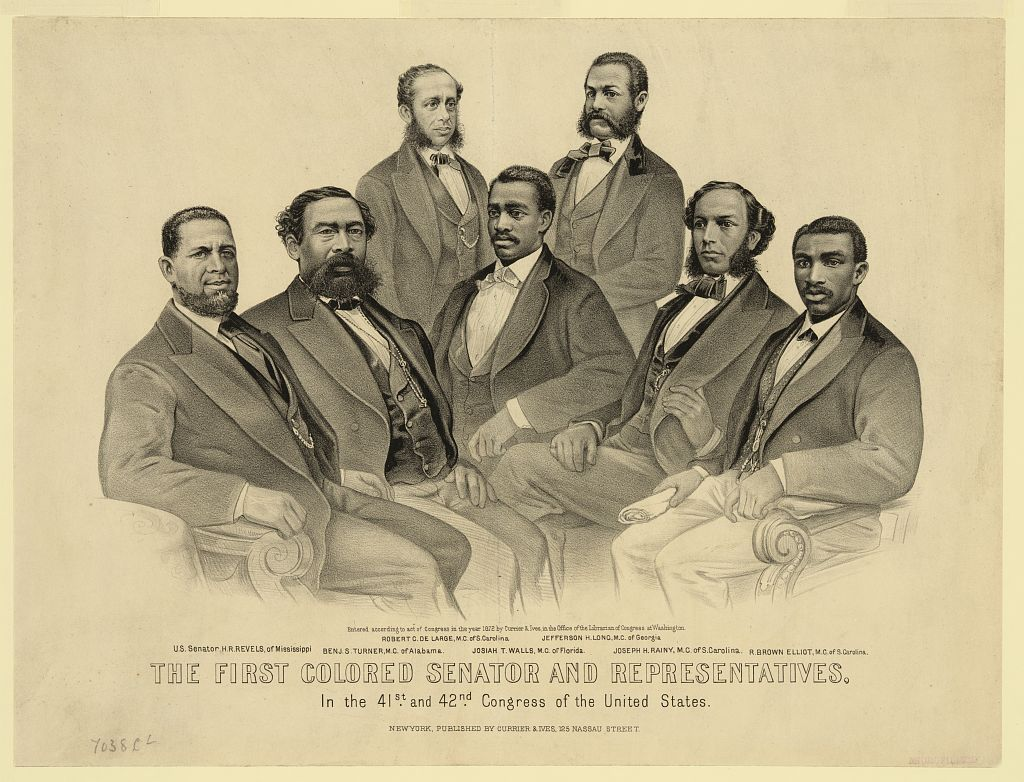
Black Senators elected during Reconstruction including Benjamin S. Turner of Alabama seated second from left

In order to be readmitted into the Union, and to comply with Reconstruction, Alabama needed to submit an oath of allegiances and modify the state constitution. This updated constitution mirrors language found in the Declaration of Independence, stating: “That all men are created equal; that they are endowed by their Creator with certain inalienable rights; that among these are life, liberty, and the pursuit of happiness.” Furthermore, the state grants “That all persons resident in this state, born in the United States, or naturalized, or who shall have legally declared their intention to become citizens of the United States, are hereby declared citizens of the State of Alabama, possessing equal civil and political rights and public privileges.” However, despite this change in the wording of their legal documents, Alabama, along with the other southern states, found it difficult to legitimately apply the changes.

== Reconstruction era ==
For the Black community, reconstruction consisted of new opportunities as well as backlash from the White supremacists in society. Violence and oppression caused many in the Black community to fear for their lives. Efforts to restrict their voting caused many Black Americans to organize and unite around their religious institutions in the fight for their rights. Voting restrictions and other discriminatory laws and social institutions laced with prejudice were designed to keep them subservient. For the White community however, reconstruction was a time of fear for their traditions and their sociological hierarchy. For poorer Whites, the idea of the Black community coming in and taking their jobs caused greater segregation throughout the state and community. As the Black community unified over the struggles for personal rights, many in the White community bonded over their desire to keep White supremacist social norms in place.

During the era of Reconstruction in Alabama the greatest tool used to persuade and inform citizens was church meetings. During these meetings, preachers, both White and Black, spoke out about what was happening around the country as well as in their own back yards. As W.E.B. Du Bois stated in The Souls of Black Folk, the Black preacher was "A leader, a politician, an orator, a ‘boss,’ an intriguer, an idealist” all rolled into one." Preachers influenced how people saw reconstruction and violence throughout Alabama. Newspapers were also used alongside church meetings to get information out to people. Papers were as divided as the people were during this time. There were White supremacist newspapers that promoted the idea of Whites controlling and putting stricter restrictions on the Black population. The papers for African Americans spoke out about equality, both politically and socially, as well as informing citizens about the violence happening throughout Alabama. Through church meetings and newspapers, Alabama was a state divided on ideas and principles throughout Reconstruction. However, in 1901 the new state Constitution put an end to Reconstruction debates throughout the state by providing clarity and stricter language regarding the equality of all men.

== Racism ==
=== Ku Klux Klan ===
As reconstruction grew in the Deep south of Alabama, the Ku Klux Klan, also known as the KKK, started to become more and more violent. Violent acts included setting houses on fire in Black communities, committing night rides where they raided homes and lynched many in society. Support for the KKK and other White supremacy groups started to decrease with time as the Black community unified for security. Large numbers of Blacks moved into close communities that outnumbered those of the White communities close to them. This provided security and safety from the KKK. Although racism and segregation remained high in Deep South Alabama, the burning of houses and lynchings started to decrease with time. Many in the White community still believed in the ideals of the confederacy, such as that Blacks should be slaves and believing that Black suffrage was an abomination, thus ruining the state of Alabama.

=== White supremacy ===
As the KKK started to decrease throughout Alabama thanks to the large number of Blacks coming together for safety, a new form of White supremacy started to emerge in different forms. One way White supremacy groups tried to limit the freedoms of Blacks was through politics. Many Whites wanted to distance themselves from Black voters and many Black voters believed that no White could be trusted. These ideals lead to split political parties and party battles regarding reconstruction issues. White supremacy groups banded together in order to divide Black unity in voting and pass more restrictive laws in Alabama. Another issue that White supremacy groups took interest in was the workforce. Following the Civil War, many Whites believed that the workforce would remain the same with Blacks doing the majority of the work while receiving low wages. Whites were given social and economic advantages by unionizing to enforce discrimination and preserve better jobs and working conditions. With this in mind, many Whites denied Blacks their rights in the workforce, forcing many Blacks into relocation to secure more freedom and preserve family unity. For many Blacks during reconstruction in Alabama, the biggest issue was not the KKK but White supremacist groups who desired to keep things as they had been.

== Jim Crow ==
Although the new constitution included guarantees of voting and other rights to all, regardless of race, it was difficult to enforce these measures. Over time, the legislation surrounding Reconstruction was loosened or unenforced. Andrew Johnson and other presidents gave the South more leniency in creating and enforcing laws that supported or created segregation and took rights away from Blacks. In 1874 an ex-confederate governor, George S. Houston, was elected to office and he, along with many other elected White supremacists, overturned the Reconstruction era in Alabama during a time period known as Redemption. As the Democratic party gained more control, the anti-slavery, pro-equal-rights Republican Party fractured and waned. During the Constitutional Convention of 1901 multiple measures were written into law to segregate and disenfranchise African Americans. In addition to written laws, Black segregation was reinforced by the long-time prejudices of the people. Geographically, cities and spaces (including individual buildings) were often designed with specifically segregated spaces. Overall, these policies and social practices acted as a buffer between Blacks and their Constitutional rights through the Civil Rights movement and beyond.

== See also ==
- Bibliography of the Reconstruction era
