= McElderry Station, Alabama =

- Unincorporated community
- McElderry Station depot in 1918

- Location within Alabama Location within the United States
- Coordinates: 33°29′11″N 85°57′49″W
- Country: United States
- State: Alabama
- County: Talladega
- Elevation: 577 ft (176 m)
- Time zone: UTC-6 (Central (CST))
  - Summer (DST): UTC-5 (CDT)
- Area codes: 256 & 938
- GNIS feature ID: 160072

McElderry Station otherwise known as McElderry, is an unincorporated community and historic train station located in Talladega County, Alabama. The community is named after Thomas McElderry, an officer in Andrew Jackson's army during the creek war. It was associated with the Louisville and Nashville Railroad and the Alabama Mineral Division. The community also played a local role in passenger and freight service in the late 19th and early 20th centuries.

== History ==
Native Muscogee Indians lived in the area, having many villages and settlements. In the 1810s and 1820s Thomas McElderry received land from Selocta Chinnabee for his service at the Battle of Talladega. This land became his plantation which quickly became the center for a small agricultural community in the area. The train station was built in the later nineteenth century and named after him. The station was part of the Louisville & Nashville Railroad (L&N) system, specifically on the Alabama Mineral Division. This division incorporated a series of multiple former local rail routes in the Alabama region that connected urban centers, with rural communities. At McElderry Station, trains would have served both passenger and freight traffic, moving local agricultural goods toward larger rail centers such as Talladega and Anniston. In the greater region, the Anniston and Atlantic Railroad, later absorbed into L&N, was one of the most important railroads running through Talladega connecting Anniston, and Sylacauga before becoming part of the standard‑gauge Alabama Mineral Railroad.

A post office operated under the name McElderry from 1884 to 1918.
