= Silk Stocking District (Talladega) =

- U.S. National Register of Historic Places
- U.S. Historic district
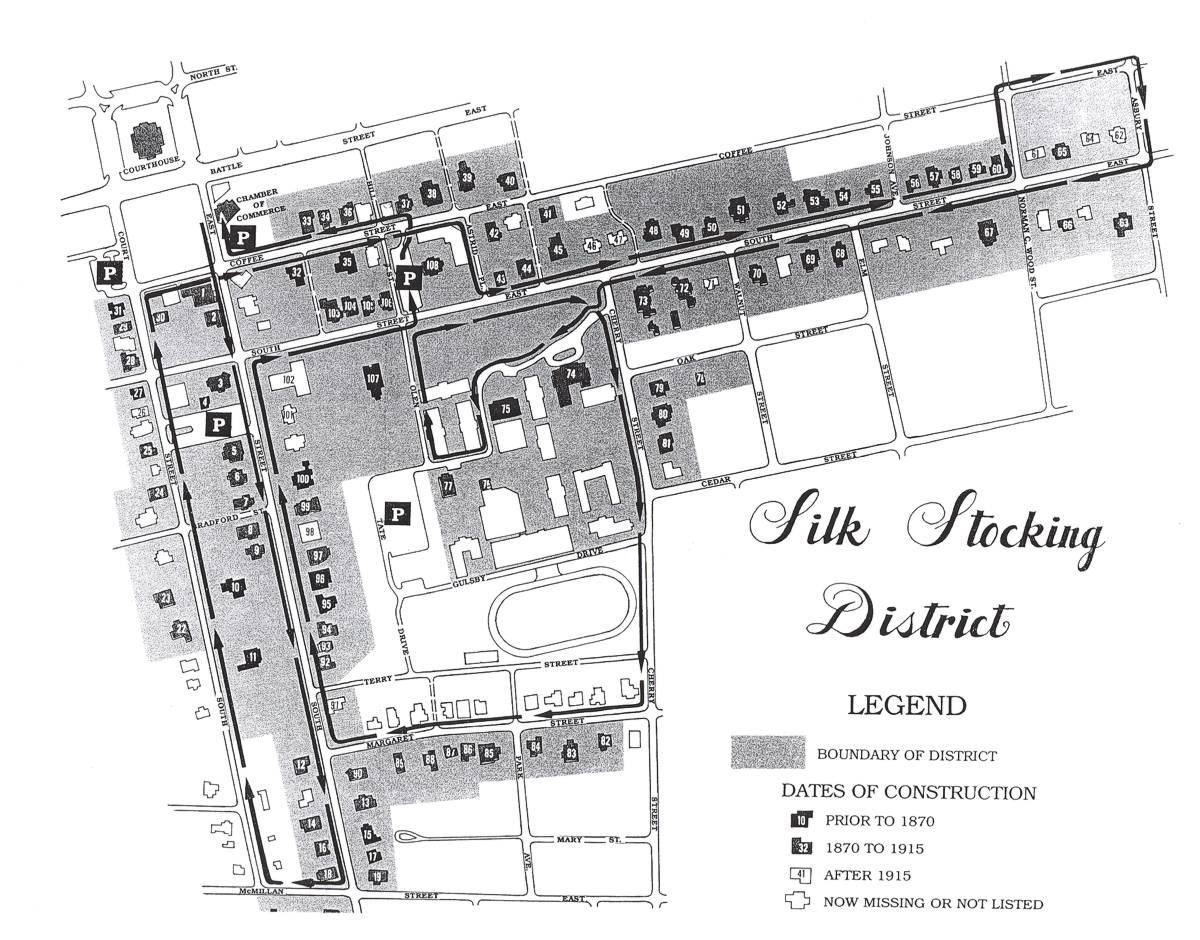
- Location: Roughly Bounded by Coffee, 2nd, McMillan, and Court Sts., Talladega, Alabama
- Coordinates: 33°25′54″N 86°5′54″W
- Area: 113 acres (46 ha)
- Architectural style: Colonial Revival, Classical Revival, Queen Anne, late Victorian
- NRHP reference No.: 79000403
- Added to NRHP: December 13, 1979

The Silk Stocking District is a historic district in the city of Talladega, Alabama, US. It was listed on the National Register of Historic Places on December 13, 1979. Architectural styles include Queen Anne, Classical Revival, Colonial Revival, American Craftsman, and other late Victorian types. The district covers 113 acres (46 ha) and contained 120 contributing properties when first listed.

Contributing Properties to the Silk Stocking District
Name	Image	Date completed	Description
Miss Willie's House		1907	Built by Dr. Samuel W. Welch and his wife Ethel in 1907. Dr. Welch served as the Alabama State Medical Officer for most of career. Upon the deaths of Dr. and Mrs Welch, the house passed to their daughter, Miss Willie Wallace Welch, who lived in the house until her death in 1997. It was designed by Frank Lockwood of Montgomery and built by contractor Robert S. West of Talladega.
Jemison-Rew Home			
Joe Cowan Home			
Talladega's First Service Station		c.1920	
Jemison-Carnegie Public Library		c.1906	Mrs. Lou McElderry Jemison donated the land and $10,000 towards building Talladega's Public Library in 1906. The building was built by local contractor Robert S. West. The Jemison-Carnegie library is one of only four remaining Carnegie-affiliated buildings in Alabama. The building now serves as the home to the Heritage Hall Museum for local history and the arts.
Whitwood		c.1836	The heart of Whitwood is two log cabins that were moved close together to form the first part of this house. This is only one of two remaining log cabins from the first years of Talladega. The remaining ones have been torn down over the years. Over the years, the Whitson family improved on the original structure to build this home. It still remains in the Whitson family to this day.
Judge Vandiver House		c.1912	Judge Jehu Wellington Vandiver build this dark brick house on the lot directly behind his father's house, Dr. John Vandiver. Judge Vandiver was a lawyer, editor, writer, lecturer, and served as mayor of Talladega.
Corner House		c.1890	This Queen Anne cottage was built in the 1890s and has traditionally been called the Corner House because the entrance faces the corner of the lot
Plowman House		c.1848	This imposing mansion was built by George Paris Plowman. He moved his family to Talladega in 1833, immediately after the founding of the town. George Plowman was elected mayor of Talladega and served as a member of the Alabama Legislature.
Wedgewood		c.1890	
Grant House		c.1890	
Thorton-Lee House		c.1888	
Robbs House		c.1840	This home was purchased by Ida Wallis Elliott in 1920 and extensively remodeled. Mrs. Elliot, the founder of the second largest travel agency in the U.S., added a marble porch and interior marble staircase, among other improvements. The house was sold to the Robb Family in 1964.
Dr. Salter Home			
Henry Thorton Home		c.1880	
Abernathy-Shaw House		c.1908	
Wren House		c.1903	E.B. Wren House was designed by architect Frank Lockwood and build by Robert S. West between 1894 and 1903.
Johnson Home		c.1905	This house was commissioned by Dr. Hal Johnson in 1905 and took two year to complete. It was designed by Frank Lockwood of Montgomery and was constructed by Robert S. West of Talladega. It features a neoclassical style with Doric columns, gray brick, with matching limestone window beams secured by a key stone.
Clardy-Jemison Home		c.1908	This brick home on Coffee Street East was built around 1908 by W. Lyman Clardy and his father, who manufactured brick at the east end of Coffee Street. They built several other brick homes and commercial buildings.
John Crete Williams Home			This brick home on Coffee Street East was built by John Crete Williams, the editor and publisher of Our Mountain Home, Talladega's Newspaper.
Dr. John Vandiver House		c.1840	This home was built by Dr. John Vandiver and his wife Mary (McAffee) in 1840. Dr. Vandiver had long medical practice in Talladega. They also operated a drug store on the town square. During the 1940s the house was purchased by Dr. Wren, a local physician, and converted into apartments.
Johnson Harrison-Montgomery Home		c.1890	This Queen Ann Victorian clapboard and shingle home was built in a style more familiar to the northeast United States. Built by Seaborne Johnson, son of Alabama Institute for the Deaf and Blind founder, it was soon sold to Dr. Groce Harrison who added a wing to serve as his and his father's medical office and operatory. Tinsley Harrison was born here in 1900. Tinsley is considered Alabama's most distinguished healthcare personality and arguably our nation's most famous internist. He was a founder and first dean of UAB medical school. The original servants' quarters remains. The house has also been home to Judge J. N. Manning and Sears Lee and is currently home to George and Andrea Montgomery.
Jim Ivey Home		c.1908	The Jim Ivey Home was originally built in 1908 and rebuilt by the same plans after it partially burned in 1913. Both times, the house was built/rebuilt by master homebuilder, Robert S. West of Talladega. Jim Ivey was a cashier at the Isbell National Bank from around World War I to World War II.
Ottis Cook Home		c.1890	Ottis Cook built this home in 1890 in Gother Brunel motif with Eastlake interior. Mr. Cook owned a large farm which was rented to others for work. After passing from the Cook family, the house served as Toddle Inn, a children's daycare center. It stood empty for years before being purchased restored by the current owners.
Reynolds-Kent-McGehee Home		c.1906	This mansion was commissioned by banker J.F. "Poley" Reynolds in 1905–1906. Frank Lockwood of Montgomery was the architect and Robert S. West of Talladega was the contractor. Originally, the home had four more columns and a balcony porch roof plus a widow's walk atop the structure. These elements were removed to give it the Greek styling you see here.
Boswell-Haywood Mansion		c.1889	The Dr. Harry Boswell – Paul Haywood Mansion was designed by renowned architect Frank Lockwood of Montgomery, Alabama, and built by Robert S. West of Talladega.
Johnson-Weaver Home		c.1907	C.S. Weaver lived in this home with his large family in Talladega, Alabama. The Weavers were one of the earliest families in Talladega and involved in the merchant business. The house remained in the Weaver family until it was recently purchased by the Alabama Institute of Deaf and Blind, who converted it to office space.
Link-Ragsdale Mansion			
Warwick Home		c.1838	The Warwick-Paul Home was constructed in the 1830s along the road that eventually became East Street South. Simeon Douglas, a lawyer, built this house. It passed through several fine families over the years and was added-on to over the years. It was eventually inherited by W. Fancier and Dr. B.B. Warwich.
Thorton Maston		c.1888	
Henkel-King Home		c.1908	William C. Henkel built this Dutch Colonial Revival bungalow in 1908. It still retains its original, ornate woodwork throughout and its original combination gas and electric lighting fixtures.
Wilson-Whetsell Home		c.1890	This house was built by Samuel Borders Wilson, a banker with the Talladega National Bank, in 1890. The house is Victorian in style with Caribbean influences.
Chilton-Gordon-Townsend Home		c.1834	This house was built using large, hand-hewn support timbers and laths. The main lumber used in the construction is heart pine. The house was built the same year that the City of Talladega was founded.
Cowan-Bath Home		c.1890	
Jackson-Mauk Home		c.1888	
McAlpine Place		c.1826	The McAlpine Place is one of the oldest homes in Talladega County and predates the founding of the City of Talladega by several years. It used to be the centerpiece of a large farm for one of the area's earliest settlers. The "bones" of the house are the original log cabin. The house faces one of the oldest roads in the State, which became East Street with the founding of Talladega.
Sims-Grice Home		c.1890	
First United Methodist Church		c.1921	The Methodist Church began meeting in 1833 at a local house near the Big Spring, a few blocks away. The congregation moved into two larger buildings in 1837 and again in 1857. Construction on this church began in 1921. Upon completion, the Rev. Clare Purcell preached the first sermon in the new church on Friday evening, April 11, 1924.
Jemison-Purefoy Home		c.1899	The Jemison-Purefoy Home was built by E.S. Jemison in 1899 and later sold to Eva and Robert Purefoy, owners of the notable Purefoy Hotel, also located in Talladega. It was subsequently purchased by Alabama Institute for the Deaf and Blind and now serves as a dormitory for the school.
Browne-Elliott Mansion		c.1912	
Adams House		c.1890	
Barclay-Merrell House		c.1833	
Clardy-Fanin House		c.1890	
Fleetwood Home		c.1892	
Harrison-Burton Home		c.1898	
House of Seven Gables		Unknown	The history of Seven Gables is somewhat muddled. It is named for its many gables and is currently owned by Landmarks Foundation.
Johnson-Weaver Home		c.1907	
McConnell-Overbey Home		c.1904	
McElderry-Malone Home		c.1905	Banker and Mayor Hugh McElderry and his wife Ruth built this in 1905. It was purchased by W.C. Malone in 1949
McMillan-Harris		c.1836	
Johnson-Weaver Home		c.1907	
Middleton House		c.1887	
Moseley-Baker-Fanin Home		c.1846	
Northern-Brown Home		c.1912	
Pollack-Rawls Home		c.1880	
Riddle-Hurst Home		c.1920	
Seavers Home		c.1900	
Sugar Hill		c.1835	Morgan- Power House (610 East Street, South): c. 1833-34; 1 story, frame, central pedimented portico, several rear additions, house faces away from street.
Wellman Home		c. 1890	302 South Street, East, 2 stories, frame, large shingled central gable, porch with paired Ionic columns on piers
