= George Paris Plowman =

American politician (1808–1878)

George Paris Plowman (July 8, 1808 – November 26, 1878) was an American politician and judge. He was mayor of Talladega, Alabama in 1864–1865. He was a member of the Alabama Legislature at the time of the Alabama state constitutional convention of 1867. He served two terms as probate judge of Talladega County.

He died November 26, 1878.

Plowman's home in the Silk Stocking District of Talladega is still standing and is on the National Register of Historic Places.
