= Talladega, Alabama =

City in Alabama, United States

- City
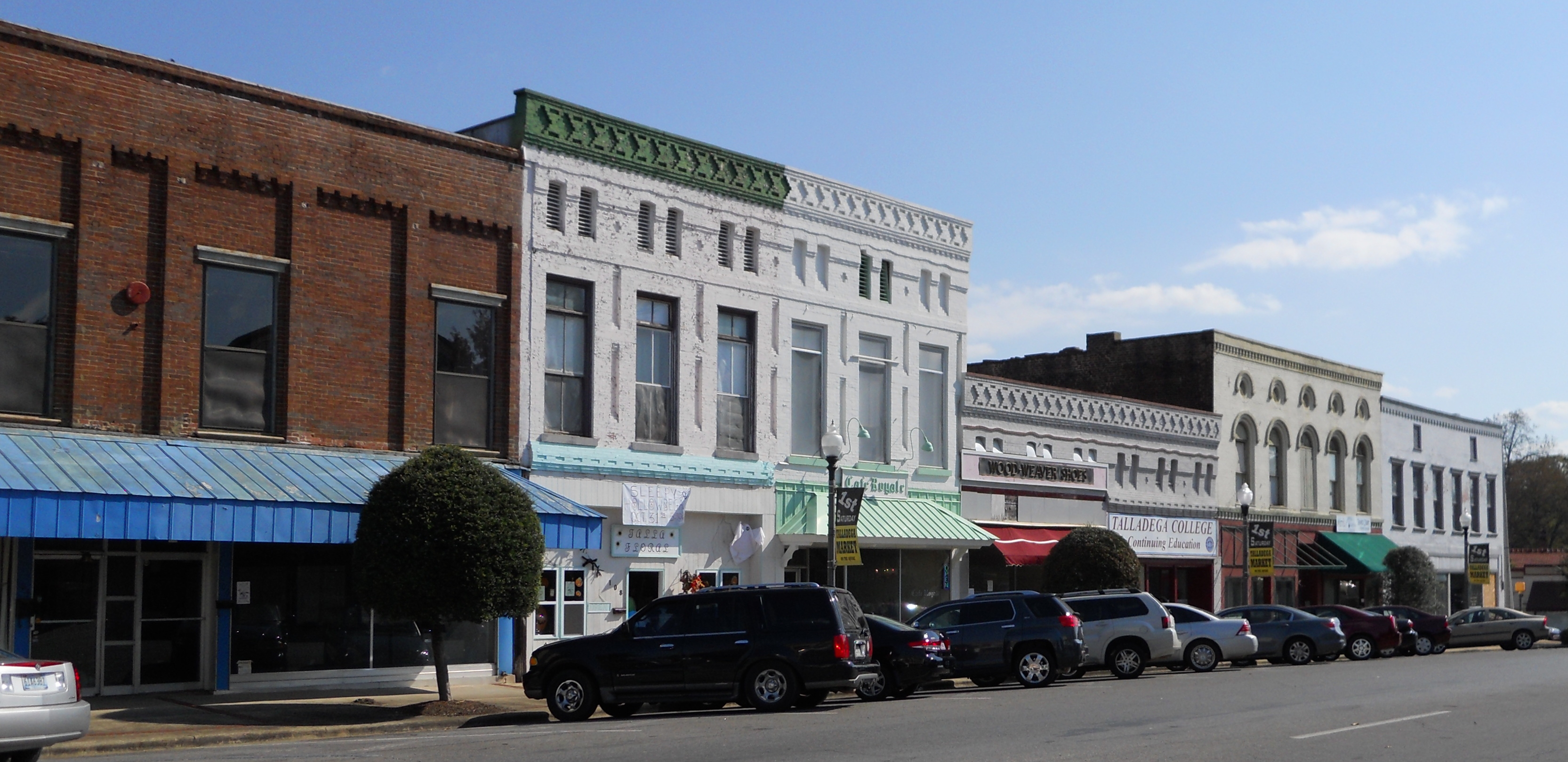
- Talladega Courthouse Square Historic District

- Logo

- Location of Talladega in Talladega County, Alabama
- Coordinates: 33°25′53″N 86°07′25″W
- Country: United States
- State: Alabama
- County: Talladega

Government
  - Mayor: Ashton S. Hall

Area
  - Total: 26.14 sq mi (67.69 km^{2})
  - Land: 26.05 sq mi (67.48 km^{2})
  - Water: 0.081 sq mi (0.21 km^{2})
- Elevation: 587 ft (179 m)

Population (2020)
  - Total: 15,861
  - Density: 608.8/sq mi (235.06/km^{2})
- Time zone: UTC-6 (Central (CST))
  - Summer (DST): UTC-5 (CDT)
- ZIP codes: 35160-35161
- Area codes: 256/938.
- FIPS code: 01-74592
- GNIS feature ID: 2405562
- Website: talladega.com

Talladega (/ˌtæləˈdɪɡə/, also /ˌtæləˈdeɪɡə/) is a city in and the county seat of Talladega County, Alabama, United States. It was incorporated in 1835. At the 2020 census, the population was 15,861. Talladega is approximately 50 miles (80 km) east of one of the state's largest cities, Birmingham.

The city is home to the Alabama Institute for the Deaf and Blind, Talladega Municipal Airport, and Talladega College, a historically black college. The Talladega Superspeedway, and the International Motorsports Hall of Fame are located nearby. The First National Bank of Talladega (now First Bank of Alabama) is the oldest bank in the State of Alabama, being founded in 1848.

== Etymology ==
The name Talladega is derived from the Muscogee language, a Native American language of the Muscogee. It comes from the word Tvlvtēke, from Muscogee tvlwv, meaning "town", and vtēke, meaning "border", indicating its location on the border between Muscogee and Natchez.

== Geography ==
Talladega is located in east central Alabama. Alabama State Routes 21, 77, and 275 are the main routes through the city. AL-77 runs through the downtown area from north to south, leading north 14 mi (23 km) to Lincoln along Interstate 20 and southeast 24 mi (39 km) to Ashland. AL-21 runs from southwest to northeast through the city, leading northeast 23 mi (37 km) to Oxford and southwest 21 mi (34 km) to Sylacauga. AL-275 runs to the north and west of the city as a bypass of the downtown area.

According to the U.S. Census Bureau, the city has a total area of 24.1 square miles (62.3 km^{2}), of which 24.0 square miles (62.1 km^{2}) is land and 0.077 square miles (0.2 km^{2}), or 0.30%, is water.

=== Climate ===
The climate in this area is characterized by hot, humid summers and generally mild to cool winters. According to the Köppen Climate Classification system, Talladega has a humid subtropical climate, abbreviated "Cfa" on climate maps.

The data below were accessed via the WRCC. They were compiled over the time period from 1888 to when this chart was created (July 2018).

Talladega's record high of 109 °F (42.8 °C) occurred in September 1925 (Alabama's record high of 112 °F was recorded in Centreville that same month), July 1930, June 1931, and July 1933. The record low of -10 °F (-23.3 °C) occurred in February 1899.

Climate data for Talladega, Alabama (1991–2020 normals, extremes 1893–present)
Month	Jan	Feb	Mar	Apr	May	Jun	Jul	Aug	Sep	Oct	Nov	Dec	Year
Record high °F (°C)	82 (28)	84 (29)	90 (32)	98 (37)	98 (37)	109 (43)	109 (43)	107 (42)	109 (43)	100 (38)	89 (32)	80 (27)	109 (43)
Mean daily maximum °F (°C)	54.2 (12.3)	58.5 (14.7)	66.7 (19.3)	74.8 (23.8)	81.9 (27.7)	87.9 (31.1)	90.8 (32.7)	90.1 (32.3)	85.6 (29.8)	75.7 (24.3)	64.9 (18.3)	56.7 (13.7)	74.0 (23.3)
Daily mean °F (°C)	42.4 (5.8)	46.0 (7.8)	53.1 (11.7)	60.5 (15.8)	68.9 (20.5)	76.2 (24.6)	79.5 (26.4)	78.7 (25.9)	73.3 (22.9)	62.1 (16.7)	51.5 (10.8)	45.0 (7.2)	61.4 (16.3)
Mean daily minimum °F (°C)	30.6 (−0.8)	33.6 (0.9)	39.6 (4.2)	46.3 (7.9)	55.8 (13.2)	64.5 (18.1)	68.2 (20.1)	67.2 (19.6)	60.9 (16.1)	48.6 (9.2)	38.1 (3.4)	33.3 (0.7)	48.9 (9.4)
Record low °F (°C)	−5 (−21)	−10 (−23)	6 (−14)	21 (−6)	32 (0)	39 (4)	48 (9)	46 (8)	35 (2)	23 (−5)	5 (−15)	0 (−18)	−10 (−23)
Average precipitation inches (mm)	5.27 (134)	6.02 (153)	5.79 (147)	4.77 (121)	4.65 (118)	4.67 (119)	4.69 (119)	3.90 (99)	3.49 (89)	3.41 (87)	4.69 (119)	5.20 (132)	56.55 (1,436)
Average snowfall inches (cm)	0.3 (0.76)	0.0 (0.0)	0.6 (1.5)	0.0 (0.0)	0.0 (0.0)	0.0 (0.0)	0.0 (0.0)	0.0 (0.0)	0.0 (0.0)	0.0 (0.0)	0.0 (0.0)	0.0 (0.0)	0.9 (2.3)
Average precipitation days (≥ 0.01 in)	10.2	9.9	10.0	8.7	8.6	10.1	10.6	9.2	6.5	6.4	7.4	10.9	108.5
Source: NOAA

== Demographics ==
Historical population
Census	Pop.	Note	%±
1850	1,320		—
1870	1,933		—
1880	1,233		−36.2%
1890	2,063		67.3%
1900	5,056		145.1%
1910	5,854		15.8%
1920	6,546		11.8%
1930	7,596		16.0%
1940	9,298		22.4%
1950	13,134		41.3%
1960	17,742		35.1%
1970	17,662		−0.5%
1980	19,128		8.3%
1990	18,175		−5.0%
2000	15,143		−16.7%
2010	15,676		3.5%
2020	15,861		1.2%
2025 (est.)	14,840	▼	−6.4%
U.S. Decennial Census

=== 2020 census ===
As of the 2020 census, Talladega had a population of 15,861, with 5,717 households and 3,334 families residing in the city.

The median age was 38.4 years. 21.3% of residents were under the age of 18 and 16.5% of residents were 65 years of age or older. For every 100 females there were 98.1 males, and for every 100 females age 18 and over there were 100.0 males age 18 and over.

79.0% of residents lived in urban areas, while 21.0% lived in rural areas.

Of Talladega households, 29.6% had children under the age of 18 living in them. Of all households, 31.9% were married-couple households, 20.3% were households with a male householder and no spouse or partner present, and 42.1% were households with a female householder and no spouse or partner present. About 33.0% of all households were made up of individuals and 13.4% had someone living alone who was 65 years of age or older.

There were 6,629 housing units, of which 13.8% were vacant. The homeowner vacancy rate was 3.1% and the rental vacancy rate was 8.6%.

Racial composition as of the 2020 census
Race	Number	Percent
White	6,763	42.6%
Black or African American	8,274	52.2%
American Indian and Alaska Native	34	0.2%
Asian	75	0.5%
Native Hawaiian and Other Pacific Islander	5	0.0%
Some other race	234	1.5%
Two or more races	476	3.0%
Hispanic or Latino (of any race)	458	2.9%

=== 2010 census ===
At the 2010 census, there were 15,676 people in 5,719 households, including 3,722 families, in the city. The population density was 653.2 inhabitants per square mile (252.2/km^{2}). There were 6,611 housing units at an average density of 275.5 per square mile (106.4/km^{2}). The racial makeup of the city was 48.7% Black or African American, 47.7% White, 0.3% Native American, 0.5% Asian, 0% Pacific Islander, 1.6% from other races, and 1.2% from two or more races. 3.4% of the population were Hispanic or Latino of any race.

Of the 5,719 households 26.6% had children under the age of 18 living with them, 36.0% were married couples living together, 23.9% had a female householder with no husband present, and 34.9% were non-families. 30.9% of households were one person and 12.0% were one person aged 65 or older. The average household size was 2.40 and the average family size was 2.96.

The age distribution was 23.2% under the age of 18, 10.8% from 18 to 24, 25.6% from 25 to 44, 25.9% from 45 to 64, and 14.5% 65 or older. The median age was 37.4 years. For every 100 females, there were 95.0 males. For every 100 females age 18 and over, there were 102.7 males.

The median household income was $32,449 and the median family income was $38,147. Males had a median income of $31,957 versus $24,209 for females. The per capita income for the city was $15,146. About 22.7% of families and 25.5% of the population were below the poverty line, including 38.8% of those under age 18 and 19.0% of those age 65 or over.

=== 2000 census ===
At the 2000 census, there were 15,143 people in 5,836 households, including 3,962 families, in the city. The population density was 634.4 inhabitants per square mile (244.9/km^{2}). There were 6,457 housing units at an average density of 270.5 per square mile (104.4/km^{2}). The racial makeup of the city was 56.15% White, 42.28% Black or African American, 0.18% Native American, 0.30% Asian, 0.02% Pacific Islander, 0.37% from other races, and 0.70% from two or more races. 0.90% of the population were Hispanic or Latino of any race.

Of the 5,836 households 30.0% had children under the age of 18 living with them, 43.7% were married couples living together, 19.7% had a female householder with no husband present, and 32.1% were non-families. 29.5% of households were one person and 13.2% were one person aged 65 or older. The average household size was 2.42 and the average family size was 2.97.

The age distribution was 25.6% under the age of 18, 10.6% from 18 to 24, 25.2% from 25 to 44, 22.8% from 45 to 64, and 15.8% 65 or older. The median age was 37 years. For every 100 females, there were 85.2 males. For every 100 females age 18 and over, there were 79.0 males.

The median household income was $29,617 and the median family income was $36,296. Males had a median income of $27,951 versus $21,326 for females. The per capita income for the city was $15,733. About 14.1% of families and 19.0% of the population were below the poverty line, including 28.4% of those under age 18 and 17.5% of those age 65 or over.

== Landmarks and places of interest ==
Talladega includes a number of properties listed on the National Register of Historic Places, including the J. L. M. Curry House and Swayne Hall, both listed as National Historic Landmarks. The main listed historic districts are the Silk Stocking District, which includes the Dr. Samuel Welch House, Talladega College Historic District, and Talladega Courthouse Square Historic District. Also included is the Talladega Superspeedway, which is a 2.66-mile-long (4.28 km) race track. It hosts two NASCAR races annually. In 2020, the Dr. William R. Harvey Museum of Art opened at Talladega College.

== Education ==
Talladega City School District is the local school district with three elementary schools and one high school in the city.

Alabama Institute for the Deaf and Blind, the statewide boarding school for the blind and deaf, is in Talladega, being established as an educational institution in 1858.

Talladega also features the historic Talladega College and the Talladega branch of the Central Alabama Community College.

== Notable people ==
- Steadham Acker, pioneer aviator
- Robert Emmett Bledsoe Baylor, former U.S. Congressman for the 2nd District of Alabama
- Tom Bleick, former NFL player, who played college football at Georgia Tech
- The original members of the gospel group The Blind Boys of Alabama met in Talladega at the Alabama School for the Blind
- Sydney J. Bowie, former U.S. Representative and nephew of Franklin Welsh Bowdon
- Taul Bradford, former U.S. Representative
- Robert Bradley attended school in Talladega at the Alabama School for the Blind.
- William W. Brandon, Governor of Alabama from 1923 to 1927
- Charles Brown, actor and member of the Negro Ensemble Company
- Ethlyne Clair, actress
- George Cruikshank, educator, newspaper editor, and historian
- Marcus Henderson Cruikshank, former member of the Confederate States Congress and Mayor of Talladega
- Lee de Forest spent most of his early life in Talladega.
- Scottie McKenzie Frasier, teacher, author, newspaper editor, lecturer, socialite, and suffragist
- Ahmad Gooden, NFL football player
- Tinsley R. Harrison, founding editor of Harrison's Principles of Internal Medicine
- Bob Jenkins, football halfback
- Eddie King, blues musician
- Herman H. Long, former president of Talladega College and former president of the United Negro College Fund
- Lamar Looney, Oklahoma state senator
- Lena B. Mathes, educator, social reformer, ordained minister
- Felix Grundy McConnell, former U.S. Representative
- Gertrude Michael, film, stage and television actress.
- Jack Nelson, Washington correspondent and bureau chief for the Los Angeles Times, was born in Talladega
- Dixie Parsons, former Major League Baseball player
- Lewis E. Parsons, Governor of Alabama from June to December 1865
- Charles Pelham, former U.S. Congressman for the 3rd District of Alabama
- George Paris Plowman, member of the Alabama Legislature and Mayor of Talladega
- Thomas S. Plowman, former U.S. Representative and Mayor of Talladega
- Dave Pope, former Major League Baseball outfielder
- Tom Ragland, former Major League Baseball second baseman
- George Scales, Negro league baseball player
- Frank Sillmon, former basketball player
- Charles Lynwood Smith Jr., senior United States federal judge
- Bennie Swain, former basketball player for the Boston Celtics
- W. Aubrey Thomas, U.S. Representative from Ohio
- Robert Smith Vance was born in Talladega in 1931. Federal judge on the United States Court of Appeals for the Eleventh Circuit

== Gallery ==
Aerial photo of Talladega Superspeedway in 2007

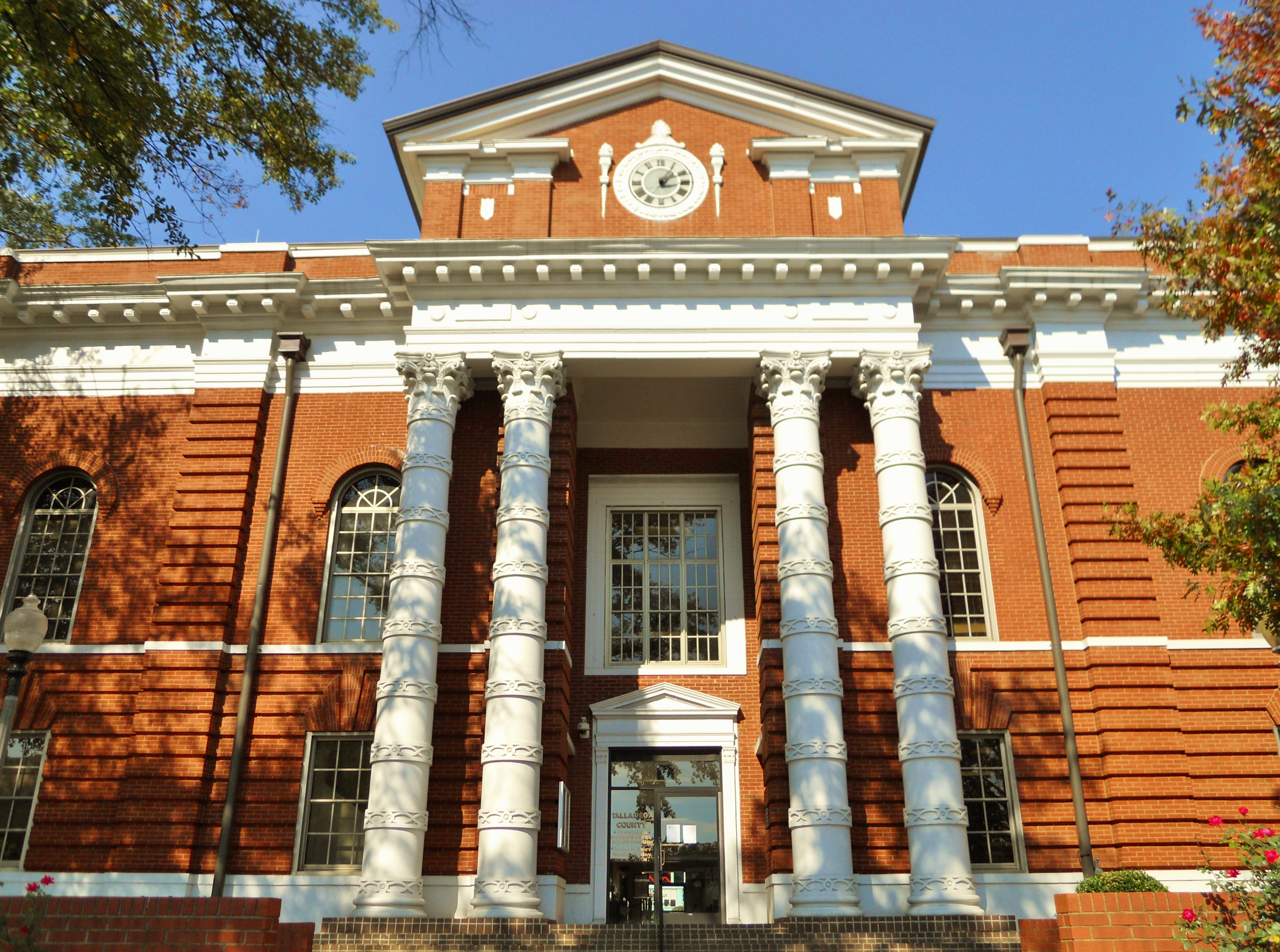
The Talladega County Courthouse is located in Talladega.

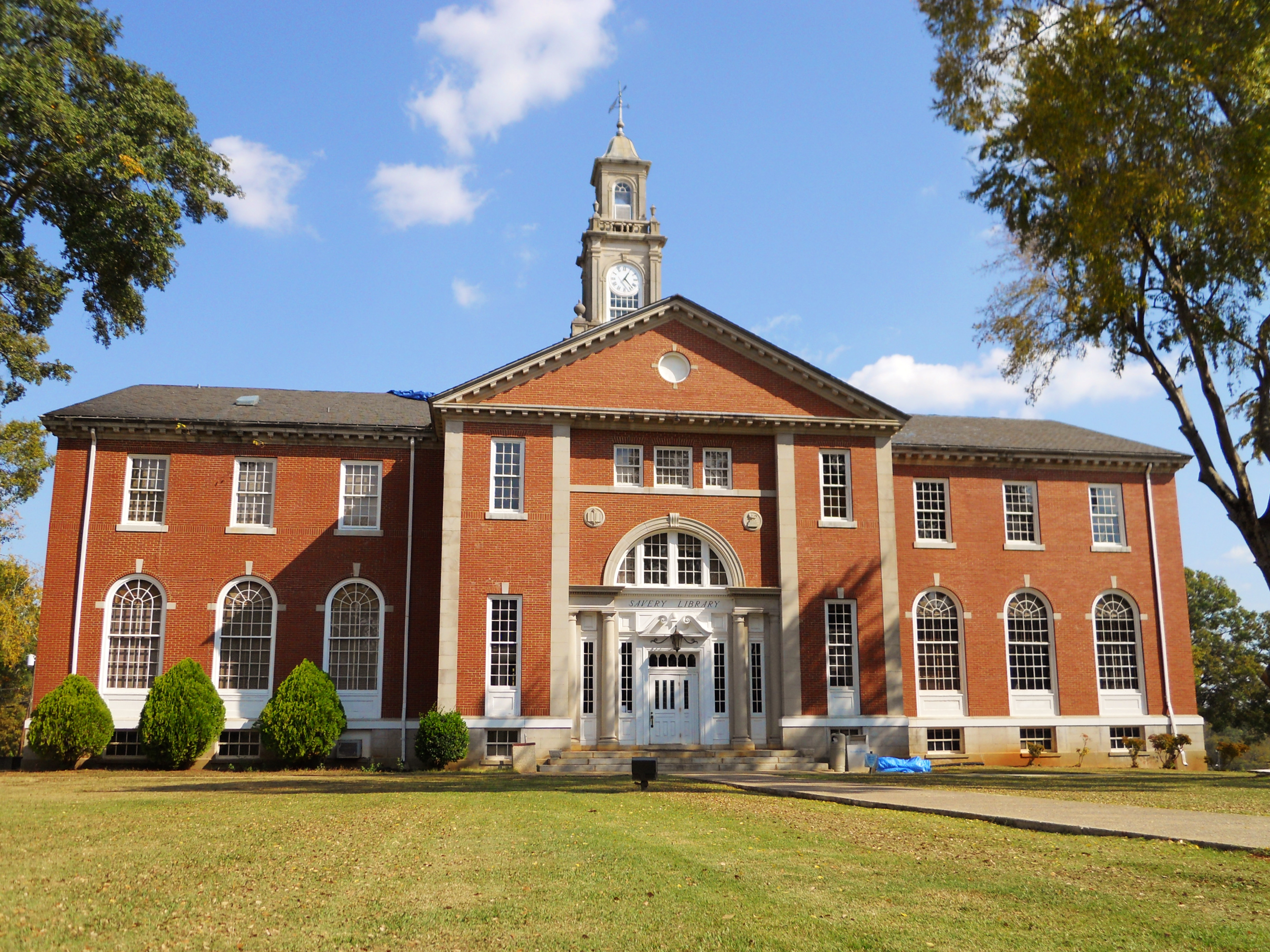
Savery Library on the campus of Talladega College, which is Alabama's oldest private historically black college.

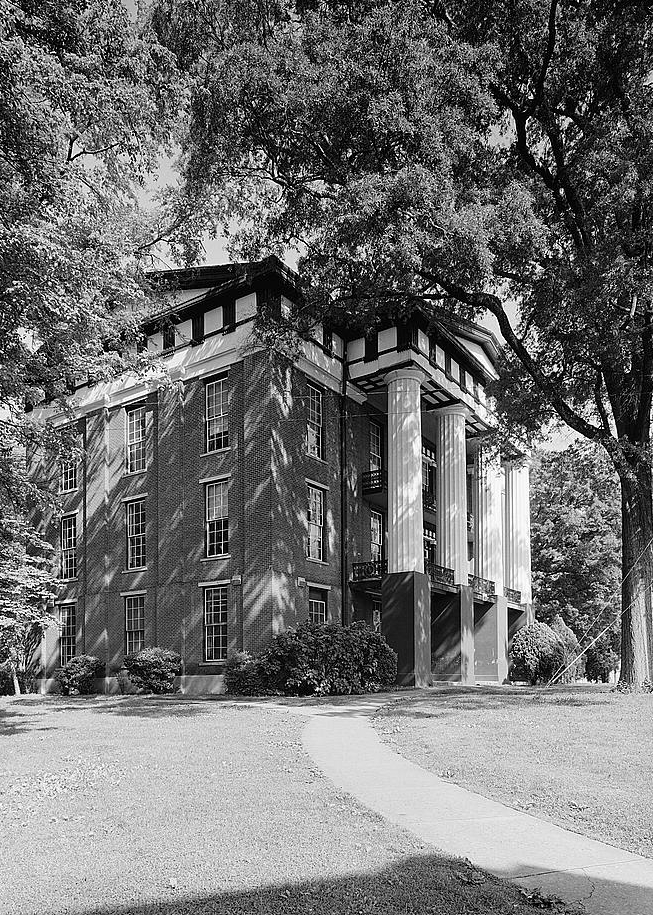
Built in 1857, and eventually named for General Wager Swayne, Swayne Hall is the oldest building on the campus of Talladega College. It was placed on the National Register of Historic Places on December 2, 1974.

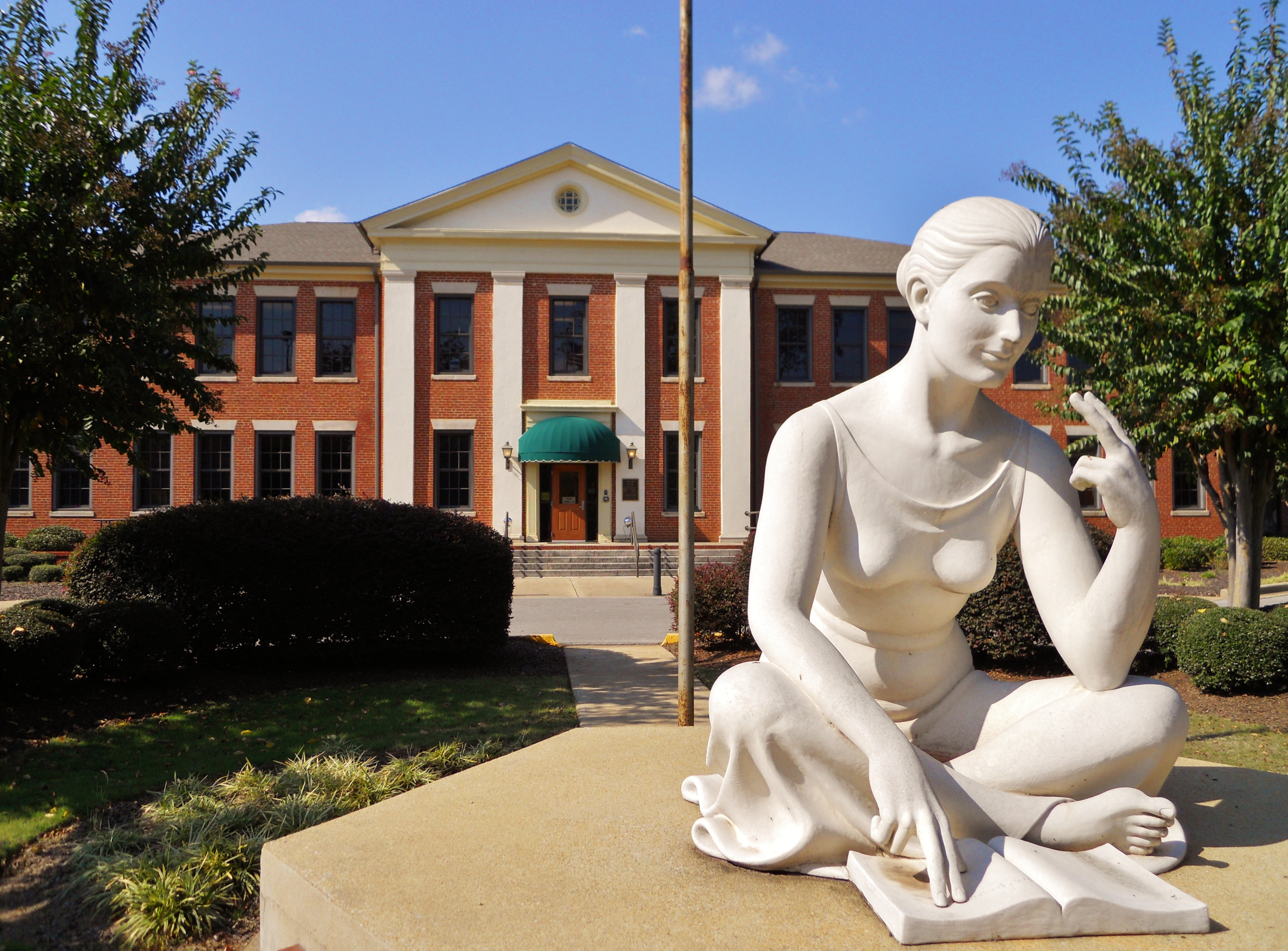
The Alabama Institute for the Deaf and Blind is a school for people with blindness and/or deafness located in Talladega.

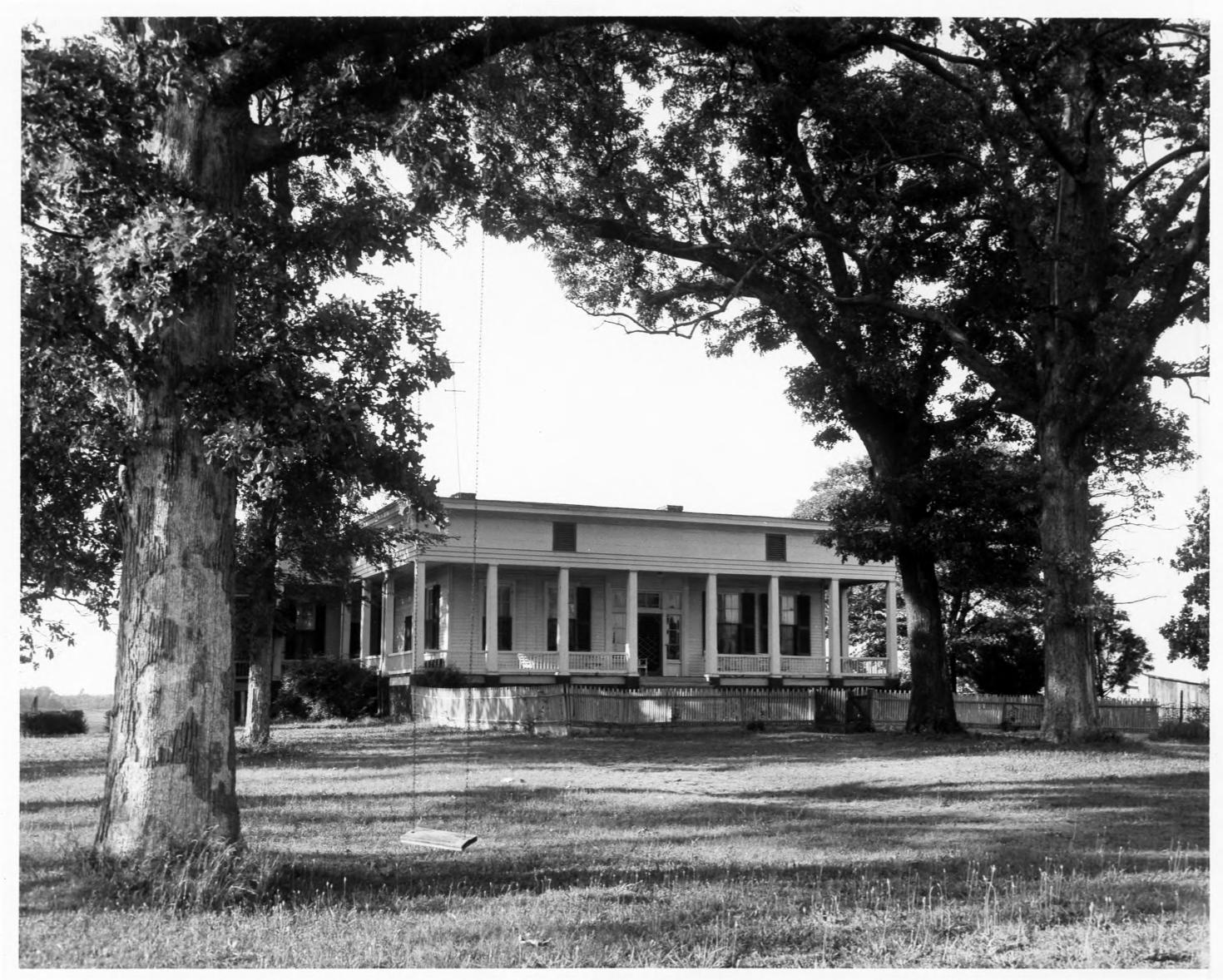
The J. L. M. Curry House was added to the National Register of Historic Places on October 15, 1966.

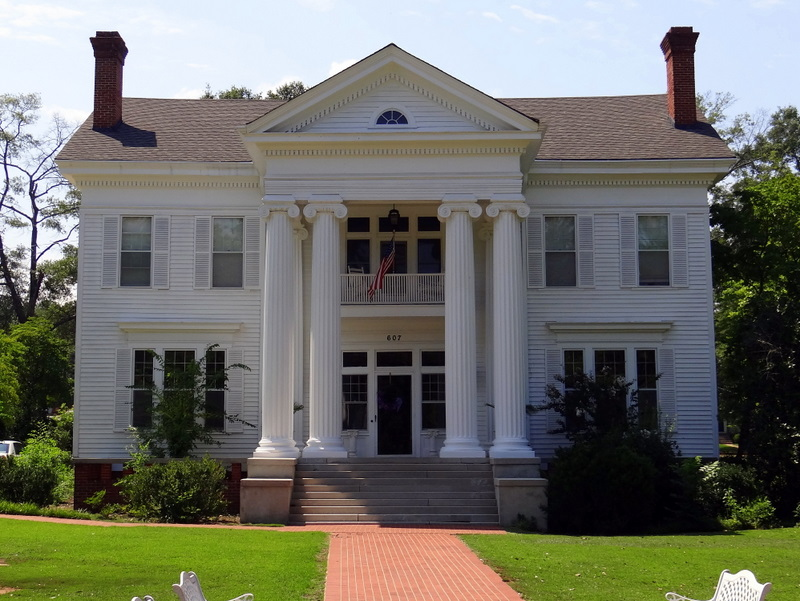
Talladega is home to the famous Silk Stocking District. The neighborhood was added to the National Register of Historic Places on December 13, 1979.

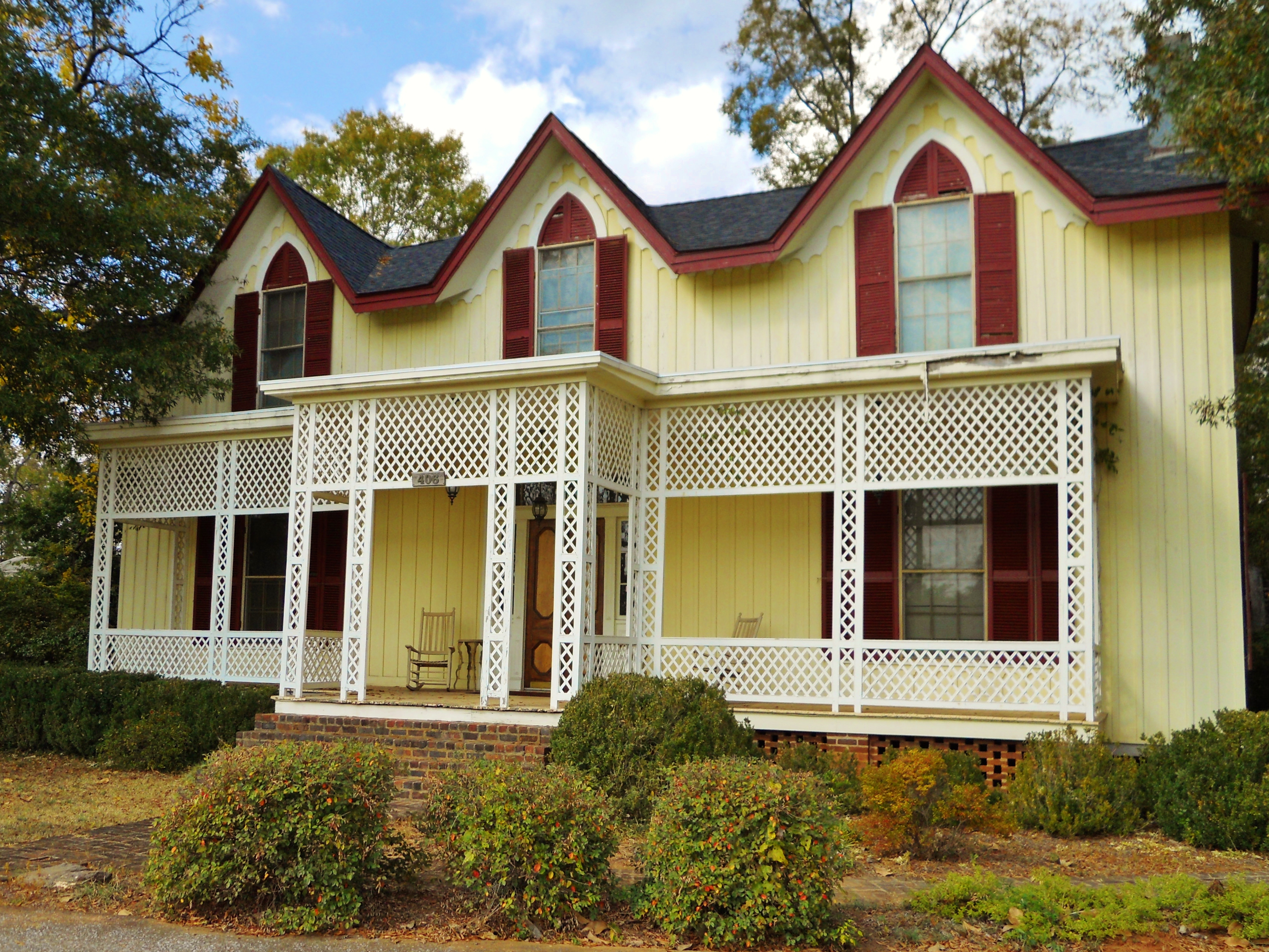
Boxwood was added to the National Register of Historic Places on June 9, 1983.

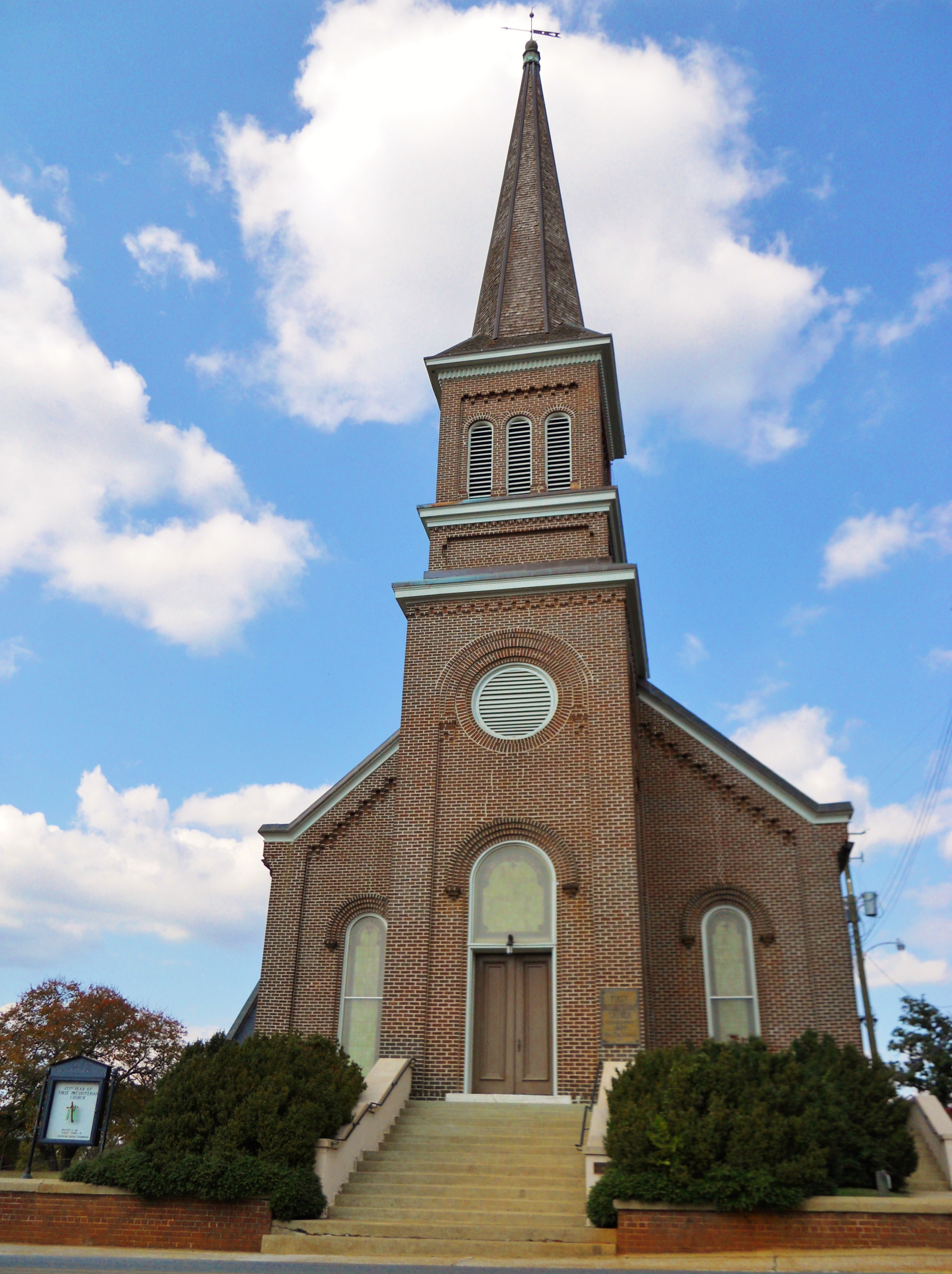
The First Presbyterian church was added to the National Register of Historic Places on November 17, 1983.

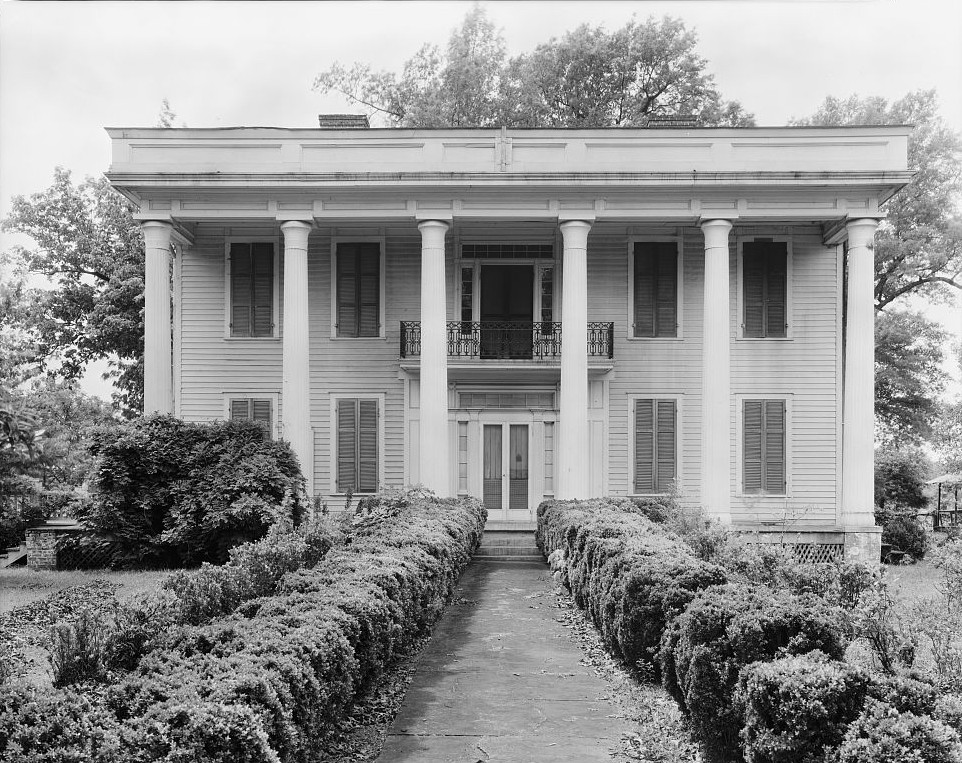
The Lawler-Whiting House was added to the National Register of Historic Places on May 22, 1986.

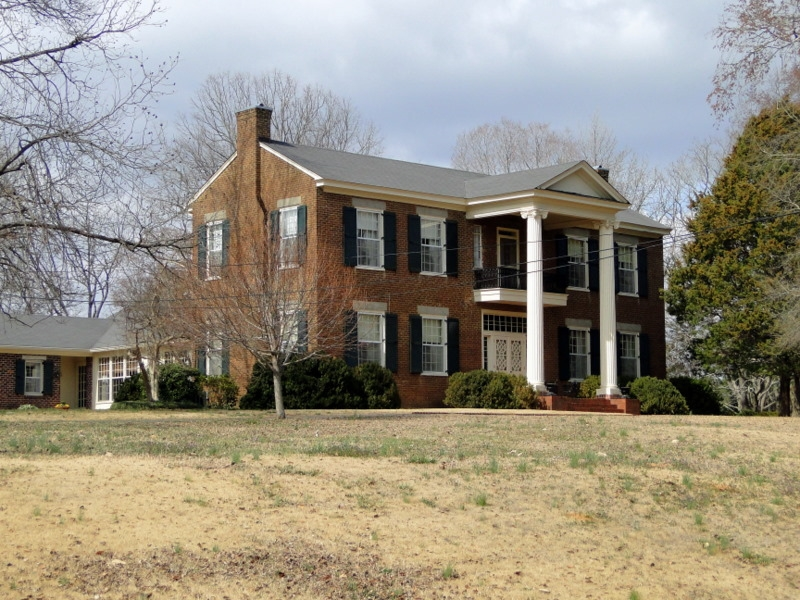
The Idlewild Plantation House was built in 1843, and it was added to the National Register of Historic Places on October 15, 1993.

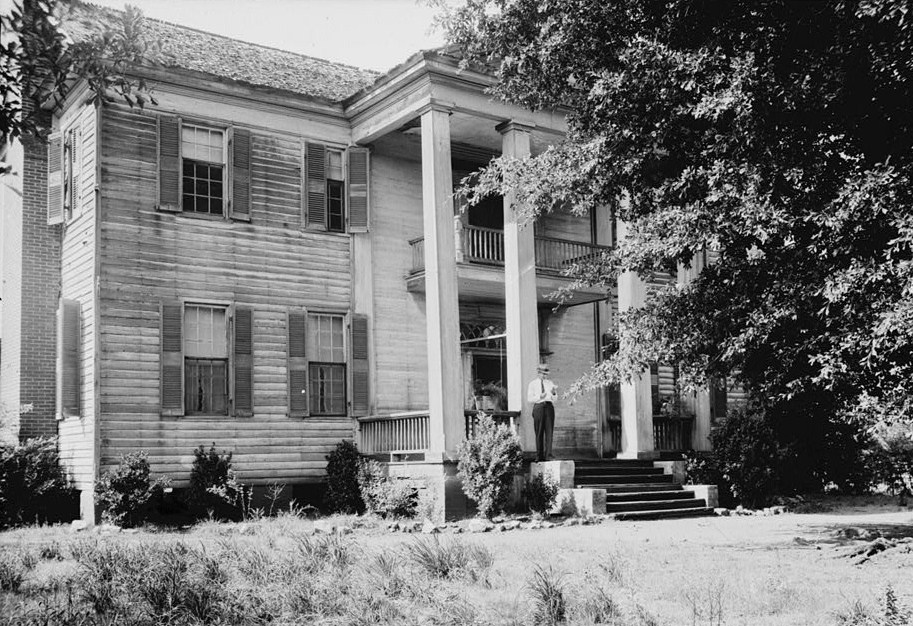
Thornhill was added to the National Register of Historic Places on February 20, 1998.

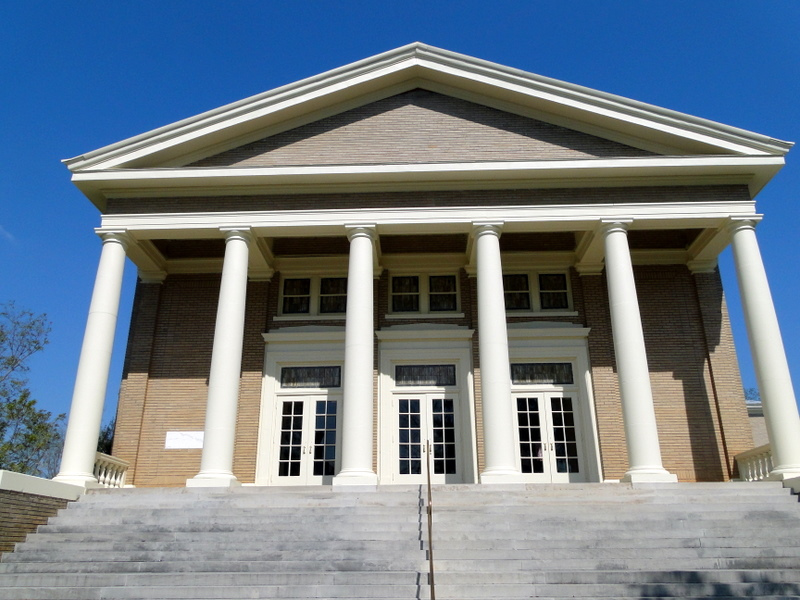
The First United Methodist Church was built in 1921.

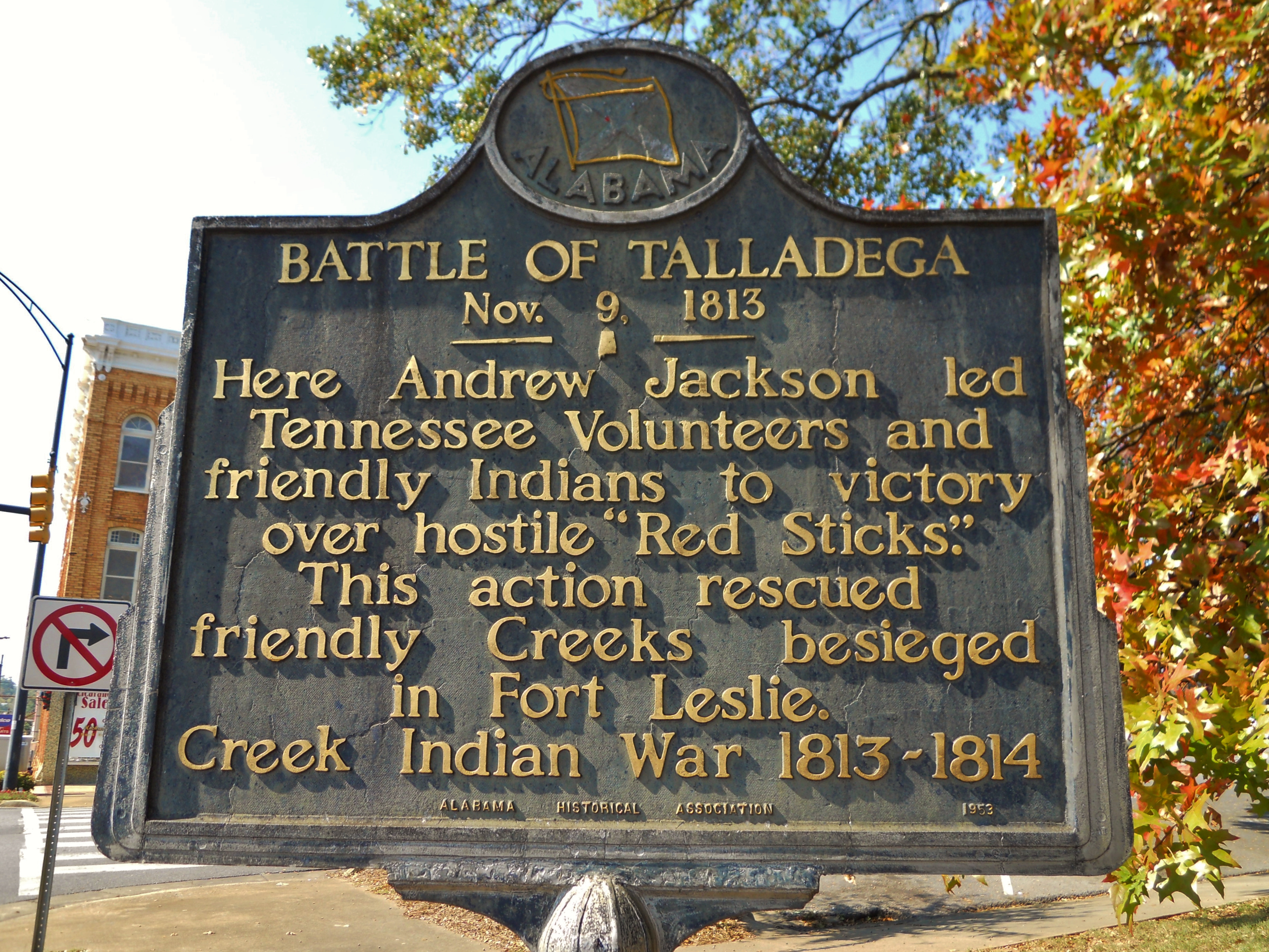
A historic marker commemorating General Andrew Jackson's victory over the Red Sticks at the Battle of Talladega during the Creek War.

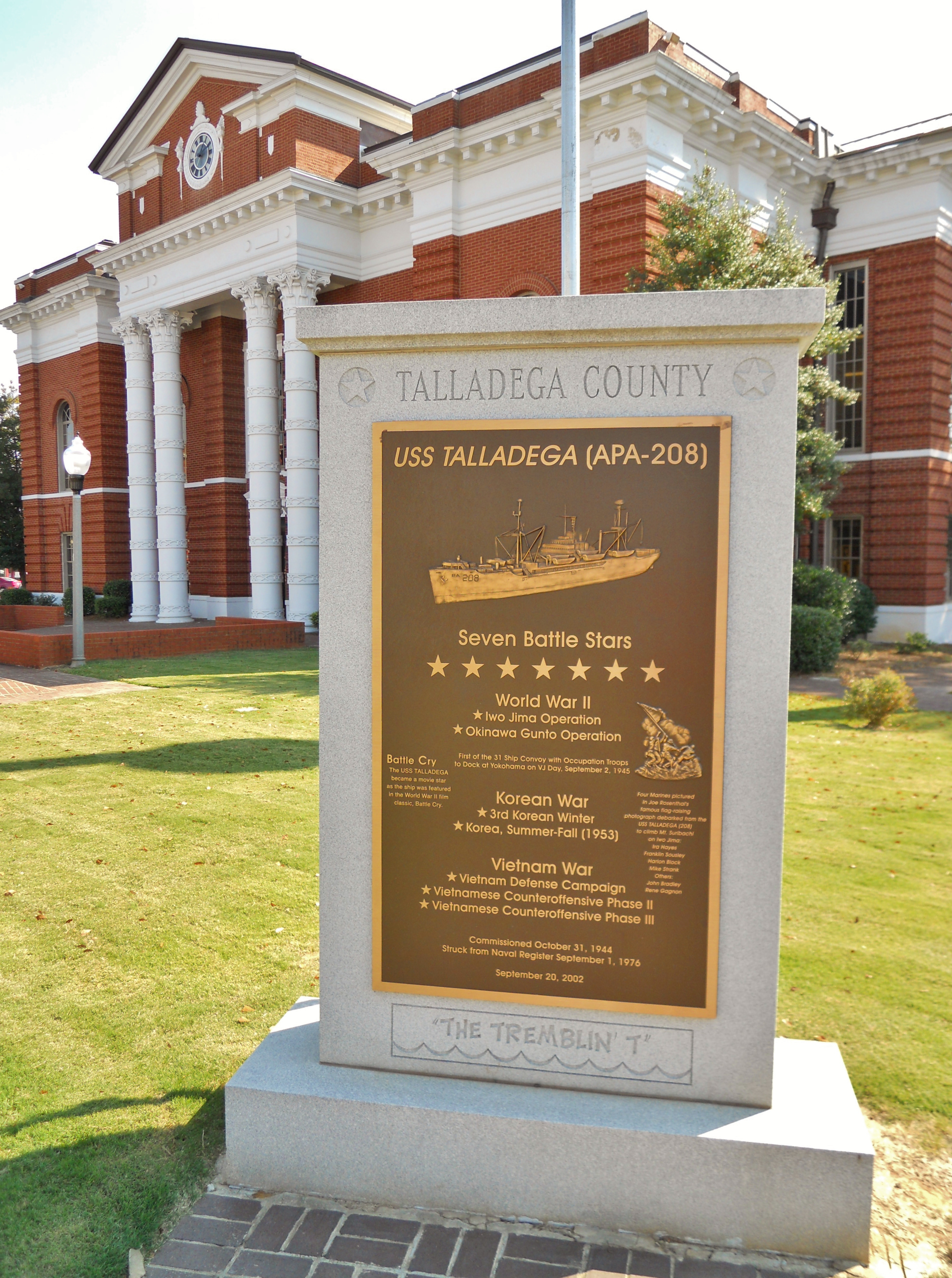
A monument to the accomplishments of the USS Talladega stands in the Talladega Historic Courthouse Square.

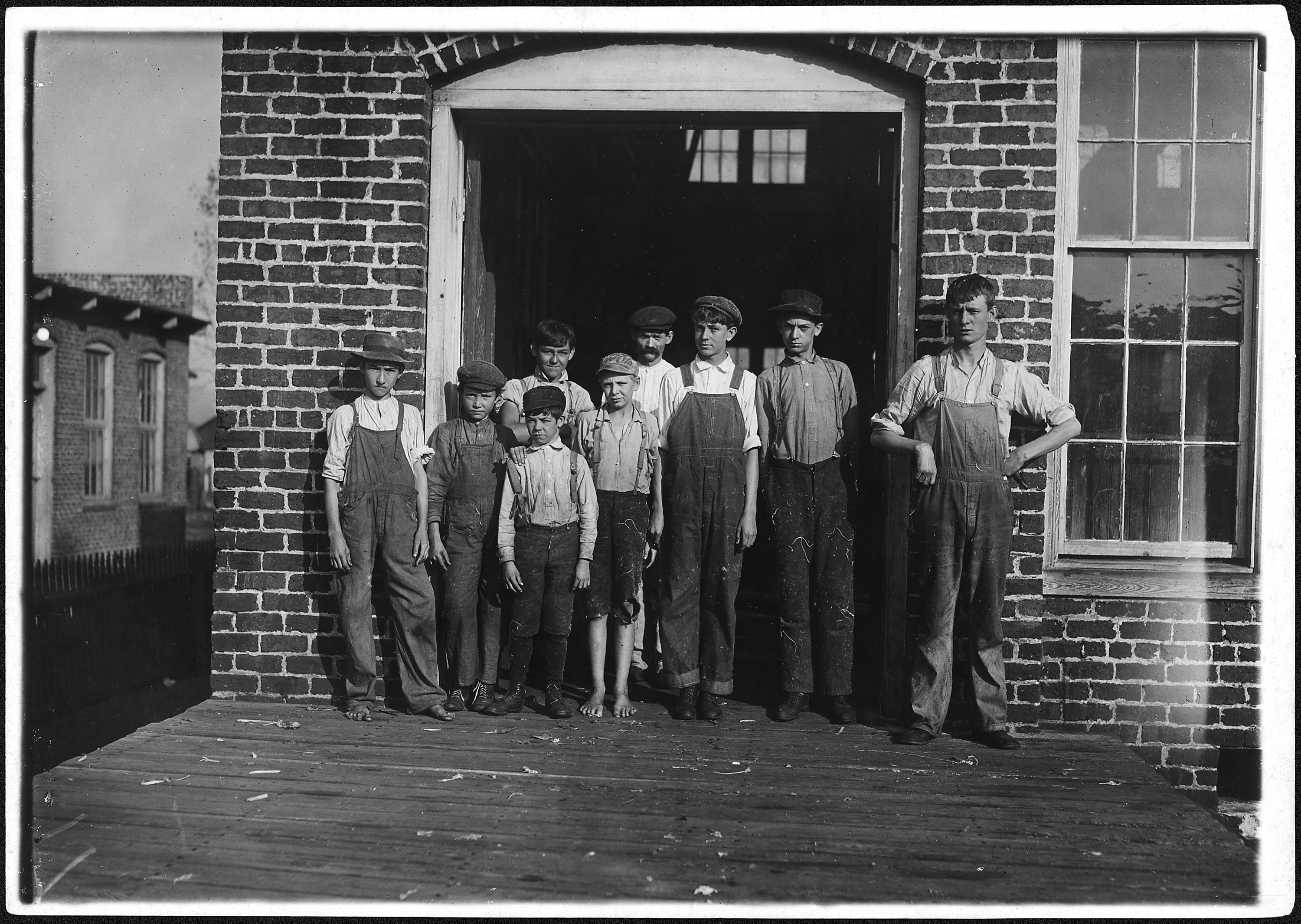
A group of doffers working in Cotton Factory posed by the superintendent of the factory. November 1910. Photographed by Lewis Hine.
