= National Register of Historic Places listings in Talladega County, Alabama =

Location of Talladega County in Alabama

This is a list of the National Register of Historic Places listings in Talladega County, Alabama.

This is intended to be a complete list of the properties and districts on the National Register of Historic Places in Talladega County, Alabama, United States. Latitude and longitude coordinates are provided for many National Register properties and districts; these locations may be seen together in an online map.

There are 25 properties and districts listed on the National Register in the county, including two National Historic Landmarks.

This National Park Service list is complete through NPS recent listings posted May 1, 2026.

== Current listings ==
	Name on the Register	Image	Date listed	Location	City or town	Description
1	Benjamin H. Averiett House		August 28, 1986 (#86002034)	State Route 8; 33°08′25″N 86°22′21″W	Fayetteville	
2	William Averiett House	William Averiett House	August 28, 1986 (#86002038)	Off State Route 8; 33°08′02″N 86°23′58″W	Fayetteville	
3	Boxwood	Boxwood	June 9, 1983 (#83002983)	406 E. North St., E. 33°26′13″N 86°05′47″W	Talladega	
4	Charles Butler House	Charles Butler House	February 26, 1996 (#96000054)	Junction of 1st St. and 10th Ave. 33°16′38″N 86°21′26″W	Childersburg	
5	B.B. Comer Memorial Library	B.B. Comer Memorial Library	September 6, 2005 (#05000972)	711 N. Broadway Ave. 33°10′39″N 86°15′04″W	Sylacauga	The building currently houses the Isabel Anderson Comer Museum & Arts Center
6	J.L.M. Curry House	J.L.M. Curry House	October 15, 1966 (#66000154)	3 mi (4.8 km) northeast of Talladega on State Route 21; 33°27′17″N 86°03′06″W	Talladega vicinity	
7	Elston House		October 8, 1976 (#76000357)	10 mi (16 km) north of Talladega on Turner's Mill Rd. 33°32′49″N 86°01′05″W	Talladega vicinity	
8	First Presbyterian Church	First Presbyterian Church	November 17, 1983 (#83003489)	130 North St., E. 33°26′10″N 86°06′03″W	Talladega	
9	Goodwin-Hamilton House	Goodwin-Hamilton House	August 28, 1986 (#86002041)	Marble Valley Rd. 33°07′03″N 86°24′46″W	Fayetteville vicinity	
10	Hightower Brothers Livery Stable	Hightower Brothers Livery Stable	July 3, 1997 (#97000650)	413 Norton Ave. 33°10′21″N 86°15′09″W	Sylacauga	
11	Idlewild	Idlewild	October 15, 1993 (#93001012)	State Route 5, 0.1 mi (0.16 km) north of State Route 21; 33°28′15″N 86°02′53″W	Talladega vicinity	
12	Jemison House Complex	Jemison House Complex	October 1, 1990 (#90001507)	South of the junction of Chocolocco and Cheaha Creeks; 33°32′02″N 86°02′44″W	Eastaboga	
13	Kymulga Mill And Covered Bridge	Kymulga Mill And Covered Bridge	October 29, 1976 (#76000356)	4.5 mi (7.2 km) northeast of Childersburg on State Route 46; 33°20′02″N 86°18′00″W	Childersburg vicinity	
14	Lawler-Whiting House	Lawler-Whiting House	May 22, 1986 (#86001157)	State Route 21 south of Talladega; 33°21′27″N 86°09′56″W	Talladega vicinity	
15	Silk Stocking District	Silk Stocking District	December 13, 1979 (#79000403)	Roughly bounded by Coffee, 2nd, McMillan, and Court Sts. 33°25′54″N 86°05′54″W	Talladega	
16	Dudley Snow House	Dudley Snow House	February 4, 1982 (#82002000)	Peek Dr. 33°35′01″N 85°48′41″W	Oxford	Originally located at 704 Snow St. in Calhoun County; moved to current location in the 1990s.
17	Swayne Hall	Swayne Hall	December 2, 1974 (#74002223)	Talladega College campus 33°26′02″N 86°06′48″W	Talladega	
18	Sylacauga Historic Commercial District	Sylacauga Historic Commercial District	June 2, 2004 (#04000563)	Roughly bounded by Broadway Ave., W. 1st., Anniston Ave., and W. 4th St. 33°10′14″N 86°15′08″W	Sylacauga	
19	Talladega College Historic District	Talladega College Historic District	August 23, 1990 (#90001316)	Junction of Battle St. and Martin Luther King Dr.; also 627 West Battle St. 33°26′00″N 86°06′51″W	Talladega	Boundary increase approved December 8, 2021.
20	Talladega County High School		September 20, 2023 (#100009127)	181 Magnolia St. 33°36′20″N 86°07′08″W	Lincoln	
21	Talladega Courthouse Square Historic District	Talladega Courthouse Square Historic District	October 18, 1972 (#72000181)	Courthouse Sq.; also roughly bounded by N. East, E. North, and S. East, and Coffee and Spring Sts. 33°26′06″N 86°06′09″W	Talladega	Second set of boundaries represent a boundary increase of June 30, 1988
22	Thornhill	Thornhill	February 20, 1998 (#98000104)	29229 State Route 21; 33°24′09″N 86°08′34″W	Talladega	
23	William Watters House	William Watters House	September 25, 1987 (#87001652)	County Highway 8; 33°08′33″N 86°24′40″W	Fayetteville	
24	Welch-Averiett House	Welch-Averiett House	August 28, 1986 (#86002044)	State Route 8; 33°08′35″N 86°23′18″W	Fayetteville	
25	Winterboro Stagecoach Inn	Winterboro Stagecoach Inn	July 6, 2005 (#05000651)	22901 State Route 21; 33°19′31″N 86°11′49″W	Winterboro	

== See also ==
- List of National Historic Landmarks in Alabama
- National Register of Historic Places listings in Alabama
