= National Register of Historic Places Multiple Property Submissions in Alabama =

List of historic places in Alabama

This is a list of the 26 multiple property submissions on the National Register of Historic Places in Alabama. They contain more than 288 individual listings of the more than 1,200 on the National Register in the state.

MPS name	# of listings	Listings (if less than 5)	City	County	Summary
19th Century Spring Hill Neighborhood Thematic Resource	8		Mobile	Mobile County	Buildings that survive from the period when Spring Hill was a summer retreat town for wealthy citizens of Mobile escaping the heat and yellow fever epidemics of the city.
Anniston Multiple Resource Area	32		Anniston	Calhoun County	
Antebellum Homes in Eutaw Thematic Resource	23		Eutaw	Greene County	A group of houses in Eutaw built prior to the American Civil War.
Apartment Hotels in Birmingham, 1900-1930 Thematic Resource	3	Claridge Manor Apartments, Highland Plaza Apartments, Ridgely Apartments	Birmingham	Jefferson County	
Benjamin H. Averiett Houses Thematic Resource	4	Benjamin H. Averiett House, William Averiett House, Goodwin-Hamilton House, Welch-Averiett House	Sylacauga	Talladega County	
Blount County Covered Bridges Thematic Resource	4	Easley Covered Bridge, Horton Mill Covered Bridge, Nectar Covered Bridge, Swann Covered Bridge	Various	Blount County	
Creole and Gulf Coast Cottages in Baldwin County Thematic Resource	10		Various	Baldwin County	
Downtown Huntsville Multiple Resource Area	31		Huntsville	Madison County	
Fairhope Multiple Resource Area	10		Fairhope	Baldwin County	
Gainesville Multiple Resource Area	7		Gainesville	Sumter County	
Greenville Multiple Resource Area	29		Greenville	Butler County	
Phenix City Multiple Resource Area	12		Phenix City	Russell County	
Plantersville Multiple Resource Area	5		Plantersville	Dallas County	
Rural Churches of Baldwin County Thematic Resource	10		Various	Baldwin County	
Tidewater Cottages in the Tennessee Valley Thematic Resource	6		Various	Colbert, Lauderdale, Lawrence, and Morgan counties	
Clarke County Multiple Property Submission	13		Various	Clarke County	
Historic Fire Stations of Birmingham Multiple Property Submission	10		Birmingham	Jefferson County	
Historic Roman Catholic Properties in Mobile Multiple Property Submission	7		Mobile	Mobile County	Properties built by the Roman Catholic church that reflect Mobile's historic Catholic heritage, unique in largely Protestant Alabama.
Lustron Houses Multiple Property Submission	9		Various	Clarke, Colbert, Jefferson, Lauderdale, and Tuscaloosa counties	
Plantation Houses of the Alabama Canebrake and Their Associated Outbuildings Multiple Property Submission	17		Various	Hale, and Marengo counties	Historic plantation complexes that are within the Canebrake, a region of the Black Belt that once was one of the wealthiest areas of the state.
Spanish Revival Residences in Mobile Multiple Property Submission	10		Mobile	Mobile County	
The Rosenwald School Building Fund and Associated Buildings Multiple Property Submission	6		Various	Autauga, Bullock, Chambers, Hale, and Montgomery counties	Rosenwald Schools that were built during a period when education for African Americans was segregated and chronically underfunded.
Valley, Alabama, and the West Point Manufacturing Company Multiple Property Submission	4	Fairfax Historic District, Langdale Historic District, Riverview Historic District, Shawmut Historic District	Valley	Chambers County	
Civil Rights Movement in Birmingham Multiple Property Submission	18		Birmingham	Jefferson County	Historic sites that played a significant role during the Civil Rights Movement in Birmingham.
Historic Resources of the Paint Rock Valley, 1820-1954	~		Various	Jackson County	
U.S. Public Health Service Syphilis Study, Macon County, Alabama, 1932-1973 Multiple Property Submission	~		Various	Macon County	
