= List of Superfund sites in Alabama =

This is a list of Superfund sites in Alabama designated under the Comprehensive Environmental Response, Compensation, and Liability Act (CERCLA) environmental law. The CERCLA federal law of 1980 authorized the United States Environmental Protection Agency (EPA) to create a list of polluted locations requiring a long-term response to clean up hazardous material contaminations. These locations are known as Superfund sites, and are placed on the National Priorities List (NPL).

The NPL guides the EPA in "determining which sites warrant further investigation" for environmental remediation. As of May 7, 2020 there were 12 Superfund sites on the National Priorities List in Alabama. Two additional sites have been proposed for entry on the list. Three sites have been cleaned up and removed from the list.

== Superfund sites ==
Proposed for addition to National Priorities List
Deleted from National Priorities List

CERCLIS ID	Name	City	County	Reason	Proposed	Listed	Construction completed	Partially deleted	Deleted
ALN000410750	35th Avenue	Birmingham	Jefferson	Lead, arsenic and benzo(a)pyrene contaminated soil.	09/22/2014	–	–	–	–
AL6210020008	Alabama Army Ammunition Plant	Childersburg	Talladega	Soil and groundwater contamination by explosives (including TNT, DNT and tetryl) and heavy metals. Asbestos.	10/15/1984	07/22/1987	–	–	–
ALD004022448	Alabama Plating Company	Vincent	Shelby	Groundwater contamination by cyanide and heavy metals including arsenic, cadmium, chromium, copper, lead, nickel and zinc has affected a recreational fishery and has potential to contaminate drinking water supplies.	08/24/2000	09/18/2012	06/21/2018	–	–
ALD981868466	American Brass	Headland	Henry	Soil and sediment contamination by PCBs and metals and groundwater contamination by boron, nitrate and ammonia from former brass smelter/foundry. Nearby creeks are affected.	01/19/1999	05/10/1999	09/01/2009	–	–
AL3210020027	Anniston Army Depot (SE Industrial Area)	Anniston	Calhoun	Solid and liquid wastes including metals, cyanide, phenols, pesticides, herbicides, chlorinated hydrocarbons, petroleum hydrocarbons, solvents, acids, chelating agents, asbestos and creosote. Soil and groundwater are contaminated by lead, thallium, antimony and chromium. The well of a nearby catfish pond was contaminated by VOCs but no health effects are expected from eating fish from the former business.	07/22/1987	03/13/1989	–	–	–
AL0001058056	Capitol City Plume	Montgomery	Montgomery	Groundwater under downtown Montgomery is contaminated principally with PCE and also with BTEX.	05/11/2000	–	–	–	–
ALD001221902	Ciba-Geigy Corp. (McIntosh Plant)	Mcintosh	Washington	Disposal areas at the plant, which formerly produced pesticides, are contaminated with DDT and related products, hexachlorocyclohexane and chlorobenzenes.	09/08/1983	09/21/1984	07/19/2000	–	–
ALD041906173	Interstate Lead Company (ILCO)	Leeds	Jefferson	Soil and groundwater contamination by lead, antimony, arsenic, cadmium, chromium and nickel from a now-bankrupt lead processing company. The site includes seven sub-sites around the city of Leeds, where lead-contaminated waste was disposed of or used as fill.	09/18/1985	06/10/1986	09/30/2014	–	–
ALD031618069	Mowbray Engineering	Greenville	Butler	Soil was contaminated by PCBs and low levels of phenols, chloroform, dichloroethane and TCA from a former transformer repair facility. Spills in 1975 and 1980 caused fish kills.	12/30/1982	09/08/1983	09/16/1991	–	12/30/1993
ALD008188708	Olin Corp. (McIntosh Plant)	Mcintosh	Washington	Groundwater, used for drinking water supply, is contaminated by mercury and chloroform.	09/08/1983	09/21/1984	–	–	–
ALD980728703	Perdido Ground Water Contamination	Perdido	Baldwin	Benzene contamination of drinking water, caused by a 1965 train derailment.	12/30/1982	09/08/1983	07/30/1993	–	05/16/2017
AL7210020742	Redstone Arsenal (US Army/NASA)	Huntsville	Madison	Ground water, soil, sediments, and surface water are contaminated by solvents, metals, pesticides, chemical warfare material, and hazardous remnants from rocket fuel research, development and testing, including perchlorate.	06/23/1993	05/31/1994	–	–	–
ALD980844385	Redwing Carriers Incorporated (Saraland)	Saraland	Mobile	The site was formerly used by a trucking company for maintenance and cleaning of tank trucks, some of which were used to carry hazardous substances. Soil and groundwater contain a tarry sludge contaminated by PAHs, pesticides and VOCs.	06/24/1988	02/21/1990	09/03/2009	–	09/28/2015
ALD095688875	Stauffer Chemical Company (Cold Creek Plant)	Bucks	Mobile	The site is adjacent to the LeMoyne Plant site and manufactures agricultural chemicals. Ponds containing sludges and soils contaminated by carbon disulfide, sulfuric acid, carbon tetrachloride, caustics, chlorine, Crystex (a proprietary sulfur-containing compound), thiocarbamates and various metals including mercury. On-site groundwater is contaminated by thiocarbamates and off-site wells by carbon tetrachloride, carbon disulfide and thiocarbamates. Sediments and fish in Cold Creek Swamp are contaminated by mercury from former discharge practices.	09/08/1983	09/21/1984	–	–	–
ALD008161176	Stauffer Chemical Company (LeMoyne Plant)	Axis	Mobile	The site is adjacent to the Cold Creek Plant site and manufactures various hazardous chemicals. Ponds contain contaminated soils and sludges, as above. Groundwater is contaminated by carbon tetrachloride, carbon disulfide, thiocarbamates and thiocyanate.	09/08/1983	09/21/1984	–	–	–
ALD007454085	T.H. Agriculture & Nutrition (Montgomery)	Montgomery	Montgomery	Groundwater contamination by pesticides, including hexachlorides, herbicides and VOCs including TCE and PCE. Soil and sediments are contaminated by pesticides, including DDT, DDE, DDD and toxaphene, and metals including arsenic.	06/24/1988	08/30/1990	09/27/2002	–	–
ALD983166299	Triana/Tennessee River	-	Morgan, Limestone, and Madison	DDT contamination of soil, sediments, ground water, surface water and fish, mostly within the Wheeler National Wildlife Refuge and Redstone Arsenal.	12/30/1982	09/08/1983	12/18/1991	–	–

== See also ==
- List of Superfund sites in the United States
- List of environmental issues
- List of waste types
- TOXMAP
