= Alabama State Route 235 =

State highway in Alabama, United States

State Route 235

Route information
- Maintained by ALDOT
- Length: 9.093 mi (14.634 km)

Major junctions
- South end: US 231 / US 280 / SR 76 at Childersburg
- North end: CR 190 / CR 191 at Grasmere

Location
- Country: United States
- State: Alabama
- Counties: Talladega

Highway system
- Alabama State Highway System; Interstate; US; State
← SR 233	→ SR 237

State Route 235 (SR 235) is a 10-mile-long (16 km) route that serves as a connection between U.S. Route 231/U.S. Route 280/State Route 76 (US 231/US 280/SR 76) at Childersburg with Talladega County Roads 190 and 191 (CR 190/CR 191) at Grasmere.

== Route description ==
The southern terminus of SR 235 is located at its intersection with US 231/US 280/SR 76 at Childersburg. From the terminus, it takes a northerly route through the Alabama Army Ammunition Plant to its northern terminus at its intersection with Talladega County Road 190 (CR 190) at Grasmere where it continues as CR 191 to its terminus at CR 58/203 just west of Talladega.

== Major intersections ==
The entire route is in Talladega County.

Location	mi	km	Destinations	Notes
Childersburg	0.000	0.000	US 231 / US 280 / SR 76 (12th Avenue/SR 53/SR 38) – Sylacauga, Talladega, Harpersville, Wilsonville	Southern terminus
	7.368	11.858	CR 58 (Plant Road)	
Grasmere	9.093	14.634	CR 190 (Kings Chapel Road) / CR 191 north (Renfroe Road)	End state maintenance; northern terminus; continues north as CR 191
1.000 mi = 1.609 km; 1.000 km = 0.621 mi
