= Curry, Alabama =

Curry, Alabama may refer to the following unincorporated communities in Alabama:

- Curry, Talladega County, Alabama
- Curry, Walker County, Alabama
