= Quintard =

Quintard may refer to:

== People with the surname ==
- Charles Todd Quintard (1824-1898), American physician and clergyman

== Places ==
- Quintard Avenue, a street in Anniston, Alabama, United States
- Quintard Mall, a mall in Oxford, Alabama, United States
