= Alabama State Route 76 =

Highway in Alabama

State Route 76

Route information
- Maintained by ALDOT
- Length: 16.641 mi (26.781 km)
- Existed: 1940–present

Major junctions
- West end: SR 25 north of Wilsonville
- US 231 / US 280 northwest of Childersburg; SR 235 in Childersburg
- East end: SR 21 in Winterboro

Location
- Country: United States
- State: Alabama
- Counties: Shelby, Talladega

Highway system
- Alabama State Highway System; Interstate; US; State
← SR 75	→ SR 77

State Route 76 (SR 76) is a 16.641-mile-long (26.781 km) state highway in Shelby and Talladega counties in the U.S. state of Alabama. The western terminus of the highway is at an intersection with SR 25 north of Wilsonville, and the eastern terminus of the highway is at an intersection with SR 21 at Winterboro.

== Route description ==
As a standalone highway, SR 76 is two-lane highway that travels through rural areas of Shelby and Talladega counties. Approximately 4 miles (6.4 km) north of Childersburg, the highway intersects U.S. Route 231 (US 231) and US 280. SR 76 is then concurrent with US 231 and US 280 along a four-lane divided highway leading into Childersburg, where it diverts from the U.S. Highways. From Childersburg until the highway’s terminus at Winterboro, SR 76 is again routed along a two-lane highway.

== Major intersections ==
County	Location	mi	km	Destinations	Notes
Shelby	Harpersville	0.000	0.000	SR 25 – Wilsonville, Columbiana, Montevallo	Western terminus
Shelby		4.962	7.986	US 231 north / US 280 west (SR 38 west / SR 53 north) – Pell City, Birmingham	West end of US 231/US 280/SR 38/SR 53 concurrency
Talladega	Childersburg	6.047	9.732	SR 235 north	Southern terminus of SR 235
Talladega	Childersburg	6.633	10.675	US 231 south / US 280 east (SR 38 east / SR 53 south) / CR 8 west – Phenix City, Fayetteville, Sylacauga	East end of US 231/US 280/SR 38/SR 53 concurrency
Talladega	Winterboro	16.641	26.781	SR 21 – Talladega, Sylacauga	Eastern terminus
1.000 mi = 1.609 km; 1.000 km = 0.621 mi: Concurrency terminus
