= Mignon, Alabama =

- CDP
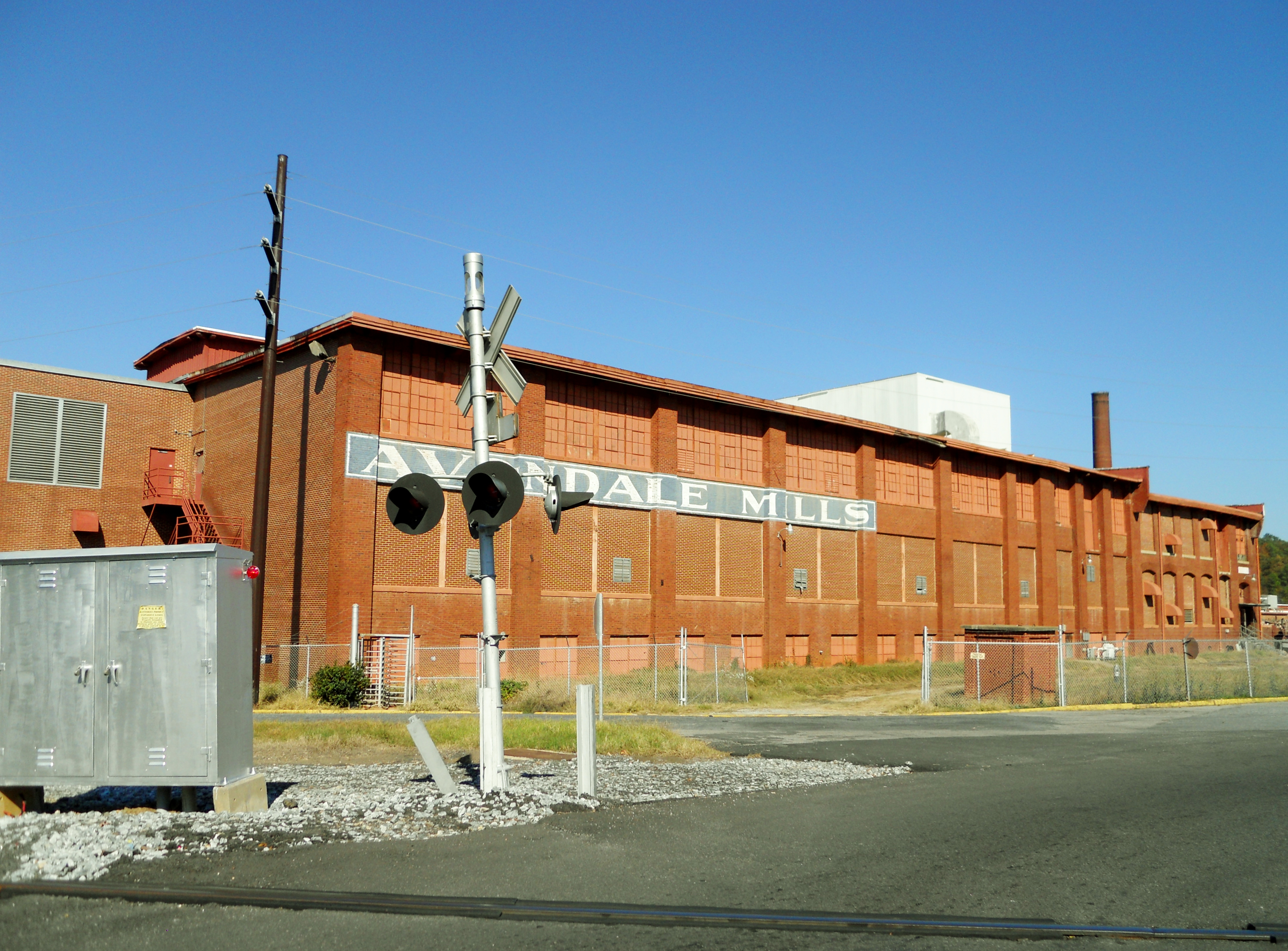
- The Avondale Mills in Mignon

- Location in Talladega County and the state of Alabama
- Coordinates: 33°11′02″N 86°15′08″W
- Country: United States
- State: Alabama
- County: Talladega

Area
  - Total: 2.03 sq mi (5.27 km^{2})
  - Land: 2.00 sq mi (5.19 km^{2})
  - Water: 0.035 sq mi (0.09 km^{2})
- Elevation: 528 ft (161 m)

Population (2020)
  - Total: 1,186
  - Density: 592.4/sq mi (228.73/km^{2})
- Time zone: UTC-6 (Central (CST))
  - Summer (DST): UTC-5 (CDT)
- ZIP code: 35150
- Area codes: 256 and 938
- FIPS code: 01-48616
- GNIS feature ID: 2403291

Mignon is a census-designated place (CDP) in Talladega County, Alabama, United States. At the 2020 census, the population was 1,186.

== History ==
Mignon initially became an incorporated town (according to the 1920 U.S. Census) around 1915, but either disincorporated or lost its charter in the 1930s and did not show on the 1940 U.S. Census. Because (as of 1950) it still was a sizeable community of 3,000 residents, it was listed on the 1950 through 1970 census rolls as an unincorporated community. Beginning in 1980, it received the new status of census-designated place (CDP).

== Geography ==
According to the U.S. Census Bureau, the CDP has a total area of 2.6 square miles (6.8 km^{2}), of which 2.6 square miles (6.7 km^{2}) is land and 0.04 square mile (0.1 km^{2}) (1.66%) is water.

== Demographics ==
Historical population
Census	Pop.	Note	%±
1920	2,028		—
1930	2,407		18.7%
1950	3,053		—
1960	2,271		−25.6%
1970	1,726		−24.0%
1980	2,054		19.0%
1990	1,548		−24.6%
2000	1,348		−12.9%
2010	1,284		−4.7%
2020	1,186		−7.6%
U.S. Decennial Census

=== Racial and ethnic composition ===
Mignon CDP, Alabama – Racial and ethnic composition Note: the US Census treats Hispanic/Latino as an ethnic category. This table excludes Latinos from the racial categories and assigns them to a separate category. Hispanics/Latinos may be of any race.
Race / Ethnicity (NH = Non-Hispanic)	Pop 2000	Pop 2010	Pop 2020	% 2000	% 2010	% 2020
White alone (NH)	1,020	816	726	75.67%	63.55%	61.21%
Black or African American alone (NH)	298	348	341	22.11%	27.10%	28.75%
Native American or Alaska Native alone (NH)	7	1	2	0.52%	0.08%	0.17%
Asian alone (NH)	2	5	0	0.15%	0.39%	0.00%
Native Hawaiian or Pacific Islander alone (NH)	0	0	1	0.00%	0.00%	0.08%
Other race alone (NH)	0	3	9	0.00%	0.23%	0.76%
Mixed race or Multiracial (NH)	14	23	55	1.04%	1.79%	4.64%
Hispanic or Latino (any race)	7	88	52	0.52%	6.85%	4.38%
Total	1,348	1,284	1,186	100.00%	100.00%	100.00%

=== 2020 census ===
As of the 2020 census, Mignon had a population of 1,186. The median age was 43.8 years. 24.0% of residents were under the age of 18 and 16.5% of residents were 65 years of age or older. For every 100 females there were 97.7 males, and for every 100 females age 18 and over there were 98.5 males age 18 and over.

87.8% of residents lived in urban areas, while 12.2% lived in rural areas.

There were 504 households in Mignon, of which 29.0% had children under the age of 18 living in them. Of all households, 30.8% were married-couple households, 25.2% were households with a male householder and no spouse or partner present, and 35.5% were households with a female householder and no spouse or partner present. About 39.5% of all households were made up of individuals and 14.8% had someone living alone who was 65 years of age or older.

There were 609 housing units, of which 17.2% were vacant. The homeowner vacancy rate was 1.6% and the rental vacancy rate was 5.7%.

=== 2010 census ===
As of the census of 2010, there were 1,284 people, 507 households, and 330 families residing in the CDP. The population density was 490 inhabitants per square mile (190/km^{2}). There were 628 housing units at an average density of 241.5 per square mile (93.2/km^{2}). The racial makeup of the CDP was 64.9% White, 27.1% Black or African American, 0.1% Native American, 0.5% Asian, and 2.3% from two or more races. 6.9% of the population were Hispanic or Latino of any race.

There were 507 households, out of which 27.2% had children under the age of 18 living with them, 37.7% were married couples living together, 19.3% had a female householder with no husband present, and 34.9% were non-families. 28.2% of all households were made up of individuals, and 10.1% had someone living alone who was 65 years of age or older. The average household size was 2.53 and the average family size was 3.05.

In the CDP, the population was spread out, with 23.3% under the age of 18, 11.1% from 18 to 24, 27.5% from 25 to 44, 27.3% from 45 to 64, and 10.7% who were 65 years of age or older. The median age was 37.7 years. For every 100 females, there were 95.1 males. For every 100 females age 18 and over, there were 105.6 males.

The median income for a household in the CDP was $30,682, and the median income for a family was $35,302. Males had a median income of $36,075 versus $13,750 for females. The per capita income for the CDP was $15,782. About 18.3% of families and 22.4% of the population were below the poverty line, including 25.8% of those under age 18 and 20.6% of those age 65 or over.

=== 2000 census ===
As of the census of 2000, there were 1,348 people, 550 households, and 365 families residing in the CDP. The population density was 480.4 inhabitants per square mile (185.5/km^{2}). There were 640 housing units at an average density of 228.1 per square mile (88.1/km^{2}). The racial makeup of the CDP was 76.19% White, 22.11% Black or African American, 0.52% Native American, 0.15% Asian, and 1.04% from two or more races. 0.52% of the population were Hispanic or Latino of any race.

There were 550 households, out of which 28.7% had children under the age of 18 living with them, 44.5% were married couples living together, 16.5% had a female householder with no husband present, and 33.5% were non-families. 30.2% of all households were made up of individuals, and 14.5% had someone living alone who was 65 years of age or older. The average household size was 2.45 and the average family size was 3.02.

In the CDP, the population was spread out, with 24.7% under the age of 18, 8.8% from 18 to 24, 28.6% from 25 to 44, 22.7% from 45 to 64, and 15.3% who were 65 years of age or older. The median age was 38 years. For every 100 females, there were 94.2 males. For every 100 females age 18 and over, there were 88.7 males.

The median income for a household in the CDP was $21,019, and the median income for a family was $27,589. Males had a median income of $28,352 versus $19,375 for females. The per capita income for the CDP was $11,675. About 28.1% of families and 28.1% of the population were below the poverty line, including 48.1% of those under age 18 and 12.3% of those age 65 or over.
