= Elston House =

- U.S. National Register of Historic Places
- Location within Alabama
- Nearest city: Talladega, Alabama
- Coordinates: 33°32′49″N 86°01′05″W
- Area: 6 acres (2.4 ha)
- Built: 1834
- Built by: Elston, Allen
- Architectural style: Georgian
- NRHP reference No.: 76000357
- Added to NRHP: October 8, 1976

Elston House, in Talladega County, Alabama, was built in 1834. It was listed on the National Register of Historic Places in 1976. It has also been known as Barta House.

It is Georgian in style.

It is located about 10 miles (16 km) north of Talladega on Turner's Mill Rd.
