= Waldo, Alabama =

- Town
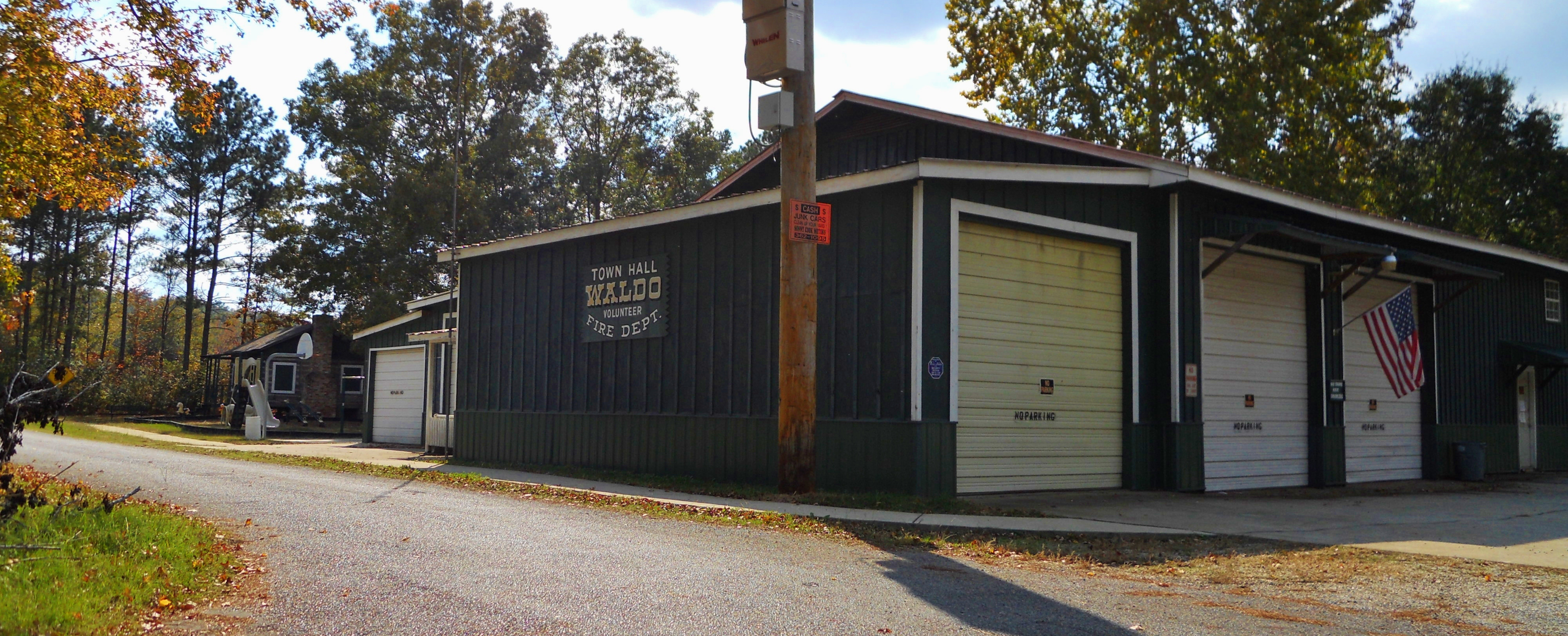
- Waldo Town Hall and Volunteer Fire Department

- Location of Waldo in Talladega County, Alabama.
- Coordinates: 33°22′37″N 86°01′58″W
- Country: United States
- State: Alabama
- County: Talladega

Area
  - Total: 2.86 sq mi (7.42 km^{2})
  - Land: 2.81 sq mi (7.28 km^{2})
  - Water: 0.054 sq mi (0.14 km^{2})
- Elevation: 719 ft (219 m)

Population (2020)
  - Total: 258
  - Density: 91.8/sq mi (35.44/km^{2})
- Time zone: UTC-6 (Central (CST))
  - Summer (DST): UTC-5 (CDT)
- FIPS code: 01-79488
- GNIS feature ID: 2406819

Waldo is a town in Talladega County, Alabama, United States. It incorporated in 1972. At the 2020 census, the population was 258.

== Geography ==
The town is located along Alabama State Route 77 in the east central part of the state. AL-77 leads north 7 mi (11 km) to Talladega, the county seat, and southeast 18 mi (29 km) to Ashland.

According to the U.S. Census Bureau, the town has a total area of 2.9 square miles (7.4 km^{2}), of which 2.8 square miles (7.3 km^{2}) is land and 0.039 square miles (0.1 km^{2}), or 1.82%, is water.

== Demographics ==
Historical population
Census	Pop.	Note	%±
1970	135		—
1980	231		71.1%
1990	309		33.8%
2000	281		−9.1%
2010	283		0.7%
2020	258		−8.8%
U.S. Decennial Census; 2013 Estimate

As of the census of 2000, there were 281 people, 102 households, and 74 families residing in the town. The population density was 98.9 inhabitants per square mile (38.2/km^{2}). There were 114 housing units at an average density of 40.1 per square mile (15.5/km^{2}). The racial makeup of the town was 55.16% White, 44.48% Black or African American, and 0.36% from two or more races.

There were 102 households, out of which 27.5% had children under the age of 18 living with them, 50.0% were married couples living together, 21.6% had a female householder with no husband present, and 26.5% were non-families. 21.6% of all households were made up of individuals, and 5.9% had someone living alone who was 65 years of age or older. The average household size was 2.75 and the average family size was 3.25.

In the town, the population was spread out, with 24.2% under the age of 18, 10.0% from 18 to 24, 25.3% from 25 to 44, 28.8% from 45 to 64, and 11.7% who were 65 years of age or older. The median age was 40 years. For every 100 females, there were 103.6 males. For every 100 females age 18 and over, there were 95.4 males.

The median income for a household in the town was $26,563, and the median income for a family was $31,750. Males had a median income of $31,364 versus $19,375 for females. The per capita income for the town was $13,743. About 19.6% of families and 17.5% of the population were below the poverty line, including 15.4% of those under the age of eighteen and 22.2% of those 65 or over.
