= Dudley Snow House =

Historic house in Alabama, United States

- U.S. National Register of Historic Places
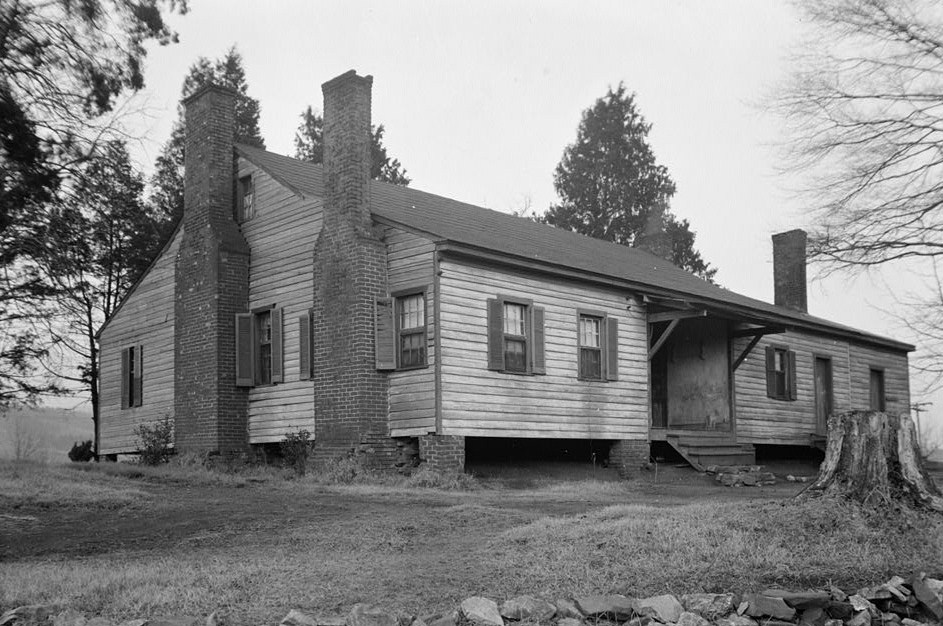
- The house in a 1935 HABS photo

- Location within Alabama Location within the United States
- Location: 704 Snow St., Oxford, Alabama
- Coordinates: 33°35′1″N 85°48′41″W
- Built: 1832
- NRHP reference No.: 82002000
- Added to NRHP: February 4, 1982

The Dudley Snow House is a historic residence in Oxford, Alabama. The house was built around 1832, soon after the Treaty of Cusseta and Muscogee removal in East Alabama. Brothers Dudley and Fielding Snow, born in North Carolina, came to Alabama from East Tennessee to found a farmstead. Dudley Snow built a one-and-a-half-story dogtrot house as the center of a complex that, by the mid-19th century, included a smokehouse, three barns, a cottonseed oil house, a cotton gin, grist mill, tannery, blacksmith shop, and slave quarters. Snow was a small-scale slaveholder, placing him in a class between a large planter and small farmer or sharecropper. The house was renovated in the 1960s, and was moved in the 1990s from the original address at 704 Snow Street (coordinates:33°36′57″N 85°49′25″W) to the actual location of Peek Drive, just across the Talladega County line, to make way for the expansion of Quintard Mall.

The house originally had a single room underneath a gable roof on either side of the breezeway, but as Snow prospered, rooms were added on either side underneath a shed roof. Enclosed stairways lead from the central rooms to the upper floor. The open central breezeway was eventually enclosed and the exterior covered in clapboard. The rearmost portion of the dogtrot was left open, forming a recessed porch. The main entrance consists of a double-leaf door with simple sidelights and transom. The interior log walls are covered with horizontal boarding and a chair rail and baseboard. The house also features primitive Federal fireplace mantels. In the 1960s, the entry was replaced with a modern stoop.

The house was listed on the National Register of Historic Places in 1982.
