= Alabama Army Ammunition Plant =

World War II munitions plant

- Superfund site
- Location within Alabama
- Location: Childersburg, Talladega, Alabama; 33°20′N 86°20′W

Information
- CERCLIS ID: AL6210020008
- Contaminants: 1,3,5-Trinitrobenzene; 1,3-Dinitrobenzene; 2,4,6-Trinitrotoluene; 2,4-Dinitrotoluene; Antimony; Arsenic; Asbestos; Barium; Cadmium; Chromium; Hexavalent chromium Lead; Mercury; N-Nitrosodimethylamine; Nickel; Polychlorinated biphenyls Tetryl

Progress
- Proposed: October 15, 1984
- Listed: July 22, 1987

The Alabama Army Ammunition Plant (ALAAP), was a United States munitions plant built and operated during World War II. The facility is located four miles (6 km) north of Childersburg, Alabama in Talladega County, Alabama.

== History ==
The ALAAP was built in 1941 as a production facility for nitrocellulose (NC), trinitrotoluene (TNT), dinitrotoluene (DNT), tetryl, and single-base smokeless powder. The facility, operated by DuPont, had a peak production rate of nearly 40 million pounds (18 million kg) of munitions per month. It also produced heavy water for the Manhattan Project. The facility ceased operation in August 1945 and was placed on standby status after the end of the war. During the war, the plant covered more than 35,000 acres (53 km^{2}).

After the end of the war, various portions of the plant were leased out for commercial operations. Most of the original structures have been destroyed, although the government retains responsibility for more than 2,000 acres (8 km^{2}) of the facility.

== Superfund site designation ==
The U.S. Environmental Protection Agency designated the plant as a Superfund site in 1987. Chemicals from the manufacturing areas of the site had contaminated groundwater and soil on the property. The Army began cleanup activities on the site in the 1990s.

== See also ==
- List of Superfund sites in Alabama
