= Alabama State Route 233 =

State highway in Alabama, United States

State Route 233

Route information
- Maintained by ALDOT
- Length: 14.561 mi (23.434 km)

Major junctions
- South end: SR 129 in Glen Allen
- I-22 / US 78 north of Glen Allen
- North end: US 278 west of Natural Bridge

Location
- Country: United States
- State: Alabama
- Counties: Fayette, Marion

Highway system
- Alabama State Highway System; Interstate; US; State
← SR 229	→ SR 235

State Route 233 (SR 233) is a 14-mile-long (23 km) route that serves as a connection between SR 129 at Glen Allen in Fayette County with US 278 west of Natural Bridge in Marion County.

== Route description ==
The southern terminus of SR 233 is located at its intersection with SR 129 on the Fayette County side of Glen Allen. From the terminus, it takes a winding northeasterly route to I-22/US 78. After crossing I-22, it takes a northerly track to its northern terminus at US 278.

== Major intersections ==
County	Location	mi	km	Destinations	Notes
Fayette	Glen Allen	0.000	0.000	SR 129 – Winfield, Fayette	Southern terminus
Marion		2.587	4.163	SR 118 – Winfield, Eldridge, Carbon Hill	
Marion		5.070	8.159	I-22 (SR 4) / US 78 – Birmingham, Tupelo	I-22/US 78 exit 34
Marion		14.561	23.434	US 278 (SR 74) – Natural Bridge, Hamilton	Northern terminus
1.000 mi = 1.609 km; 1.000 km = 0.621 mi
