= Fishtrap, Alabama =

- Unincorporated community
- Location within Alabama Location within the United States
- Coordinates: 33°29′25″N 86°14′26″W
- Country: United States
- State: Alabama
- County: Talladega
- Elevation: 469 ft (143 m)
- Time zone: UTC-6 (Central (CST))
  - Summer (DST): UTC-5 (CDT)
- Area codes: 256 & 938

Fishtrap, also known as Beavers Fish Trap or Sims Trap, is an unincorporated community in Talladega County, Alabama, United States.
