= Swayne Hall, Talladega College =

- U.S. National Register of Historic Places
- U.S. National Historic Landmark
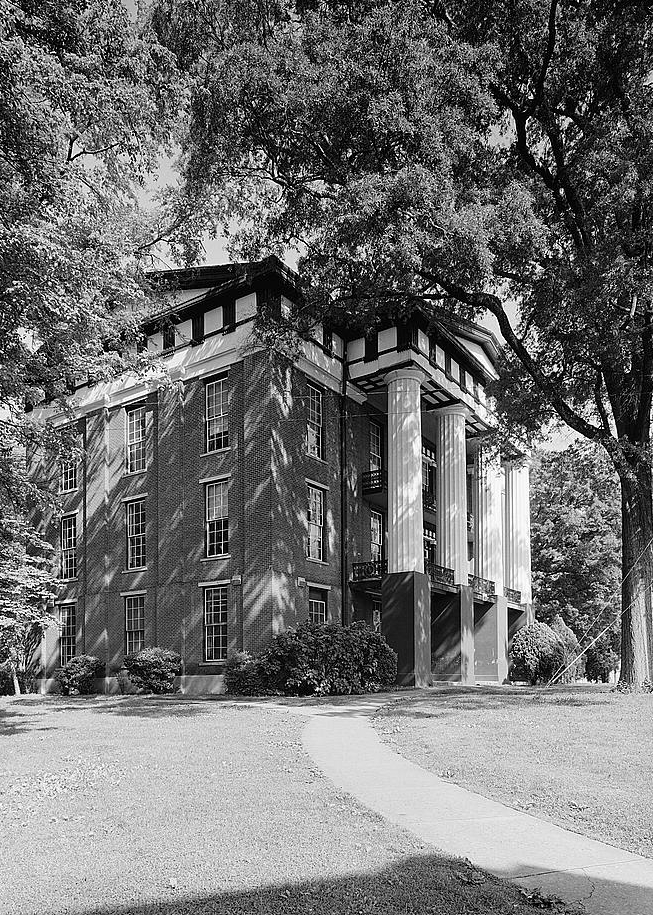

- Location within Alabama Location within the United States
- Location: Talladega College campus, Talladega, Alabama
- Coordinates: 33°26′02″N 86°06′48″W
- Area: less than one acre
- Built: 1857
- Architectural style: Greek Revival
- NRHP reference No.: 74002223

Significant dates
- Added to NRHP: December 2, 1974
- Designated NHL: December 2, 1974

Swayne Hall is the oldest building on the campus of Talladega College in Talladega, Alabama, United States. It was built in 1857 by slaves for use by a Baptist men's college. It was designated a National Historic Landmark in 1974 for Talladega College's role as one of the few historically black colleges and universities to maintain a liberal arts focus. It was the only liberal arts college open to black Americans in Alabama for many years.

== Description and history ==
Swayne Hall occupies a central position on the campus of Talladega College, set north of West Brattle Street and east of Martin Luther King Jr. Boulevard. It is a three-story masonry structure, built out of brick and covered by a gabled roof. Its main facade is dominated by a full-height projecting portico, with four fluted Doric columns supporting an entablature and pedimented gable. There are cast-iron balconies on the second and third floors.

The building was constructed in 1857 for a Baptist men's college, in part by the use of slave labor provided by the subscribers who underwrote its construction. It was acquired by the American Missionary Association in 1867 when it founded Talladega College. The building is named for General Wager Swayne, a Union Army general during the American Civil War who also served as the appointed military Governor of Alabama during the early days of Reconstruction, serving from 1867 to 1868.

Talladega College is one of a small number of historically black colleges and universities (HBCUs) that resisted trends of the late 19th and early 20th century to focus the education of African Americans on vocations, and maintained a focus on the liberal arts. For many years it was the only school in Alabama at which African Americans could get an undergraduate education, and was one of the most successful HBCUs at sending its students on to graduate-level programs.

== See also ==
- List of National Historic Landmarks in Alabama
- National Register of Historic Places listings in Talladega County, Alabama
