= Liberty Hill, Talladega County, Alabama =

Liberty Hill, Alabama
- Unincorporated community
- Location within Alabama Location within the United States
- Coordinates: 33°10′13″N 86°11′58″W
- Country: United States
- State: Alabama
- County: Talladega
- Elevation: 741 ft (226 m)
- Time zone: UTC-6 (Central (CST))
  - Summer (DST): UTC-5 (CDT)
- Area codes: 256 & 938
- GNIS feature ID: 162470

Liberty Hill is an unincorporated community in Talladega County, Alabama, United States, located 3 miles (4.8 km) east of Sylacauga.
