= Waldo Bridge =

Waldo Bridge may refer to:

- Waldo Covered Bridge, a covered bridge in Alabama, United States
- Waldo-Hancock Bridge, a suspension bridge in Maine, United States
