= Laniers, Alabama =

- Unincorporated community
- Location within Alabama Location within the United States
- Coordinates: 33°22′53″N 86°19′39″W
- Country: United States
- State: Alabama
- County: Talladega
- Elevation: 427 ft (130 m)
- Time zone: UTC-6 (Central (CST))
  - Summer (DST): UTC-5 (CDT)
- Area codes: 256 & 938
- GNIS feature ID: 156581

Laniers, also known as Laniersville, is an unincorporated community in Talladega County, Alabama, United States.

== History ==
Laniers is named for the Lanier family, who settled in the area in the 1890s. A post office operated under the name Laniers from 1903 to 1907.
