= Renfroe, Alabama =

- Unincorporated community
- Location within Alabama Location within the United States
- Coordinates: 33°25′52″N 86°12′06″W
- Country: United States
- State: Alabama
- County: Talladega
- Elevation: 607 ft (185 m)
- Time zone: UTC-6 (Central (CST))
  - Summer (DST): UTC-5 (CDT)
- Area codes: 256 & 938
- GNIS feature ID: 153136

Renfroe, also known as Stick To It, is an unincorporated community in Talladega County, Alabama, United States.

== History ==
Renfroe was named by D. M. and D. W. Rogers, who built a sawmill there. It was named in honor of J. J. D. Renfroe, who served as a chaplain in the 10th Regiment Alabama Infantry, preacher at First Baptist Church of Talladega and Southside Baptist Church in Birmingham, editor of The Alabama Baptist, and was instrumental in moving Howard College from Marion to Birmingham. Renfroe was incorporated from 1887 to 1900.

A post office operated under the name Renfroe from 1880 to 1955.
