= Kentuck, Alabama =

- Unincorporated community
- Location within Alabama Location within the United States
- Coordinates: 33°31′51″N 85°49′50″W
- Country: United States
- State: Alabama
- County: Talladega
- Elevation: 1,112 ft (339 m)
- Time zone: UTC-6 (Central (CST))
  - Summer (DST): UTC-5 (CDT)
- Area codes: 256 & 938

Kentuck, also known as Kaintuck, is an unincorporated community in Talladega County, Alabama, United States.
