= Kahatchie, Talladega County, Alabama =

Kahatchie, Alabama
- Unincorporated community
- Location within Alabama Location within the United States
- Coordinates: 33°12′08″N 86°24′30″W
- Country: United States
- State: Alabama
- County: Talladega
- Elevation: 495 ft (151 m)
- Time zone: UTC-6 (Central (CST))
  - Summer (DST): UTC-5 (CDT)
- Area codes: 256 & 938
- GNIS feature ID: 164208

Kahatchee, also known as Handytown, Achates, Cohatchie, or Keyhatchie, is an unincorporated community in Talladega County, Alabama, United States.

== History ==
The community's name comes from the same name of an Upper Creek town which was located here. It also lends its name to nearby Kahatchee Creek and the Kahatchie Hills. In Creek, Kahatchie means "cane creek", in reference to the river cane which grows along waterways throughout Alabama. A post office called Handytown was established in 1873, and remained in operation until it was discontinued in 1874. A post office was then operated in the area under the name Achates from 1882 until it was closed in 1894.
