= Welch-Averiett House =

- U.S. National Register of Historic Places
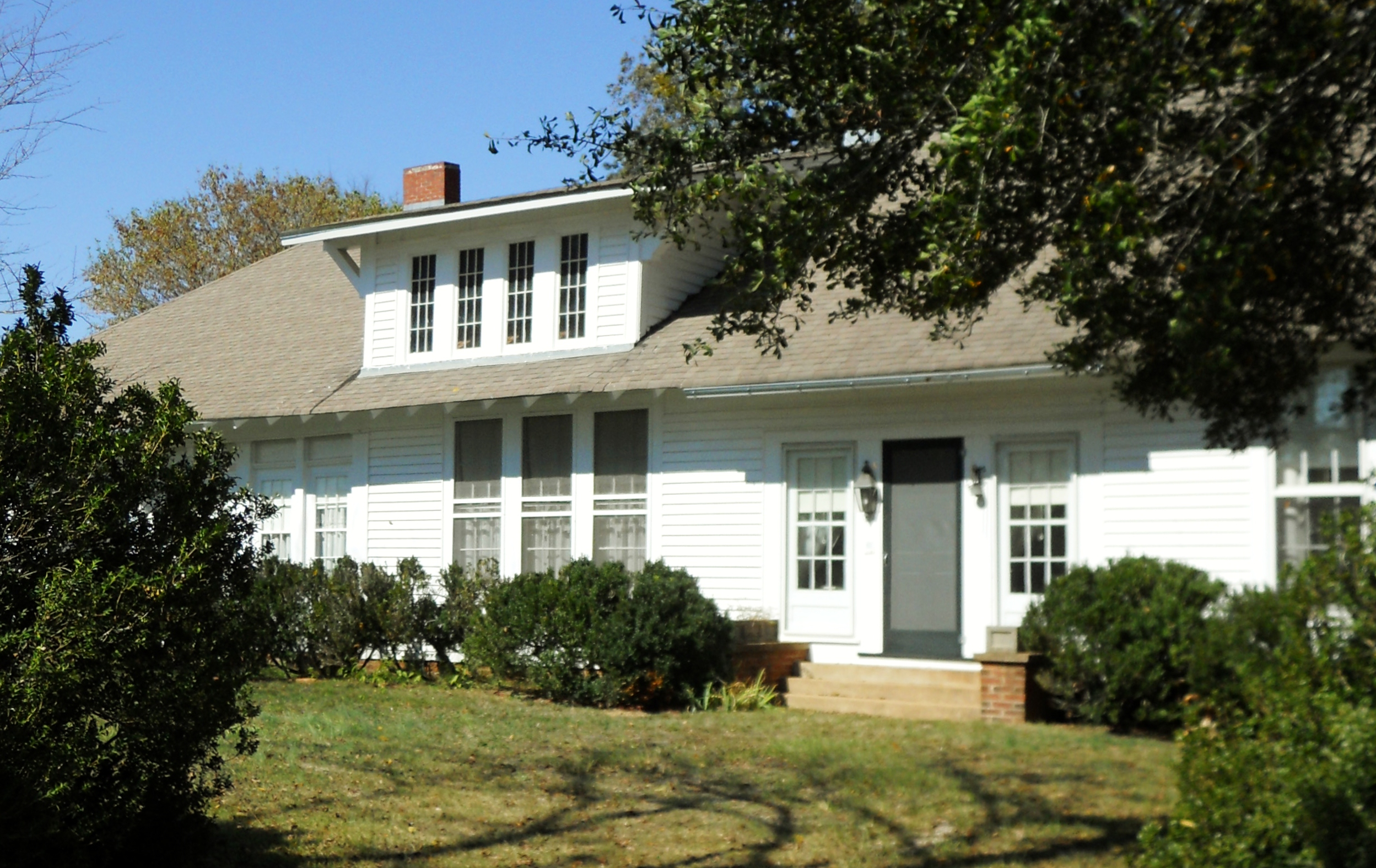
- Photo from 2011

- Location within Alabama
- Nearest city: Sylacauga, Alabama
- Coordinates: 33°08′35″N 86°23′18″W
- Area: 44 acres (18 ha)
- Built: c.1830, c.1920
- MPS: Benjamin H. Averiett Houses TR
- NRHP reference No.: 86002044
- Added to NRHP: August 28, 1986

The Welch-Averiett House, in Talladega County, Alabama near Sylacauga, Alabama, dates from 1830. It was listed on the National Register of Historic Places in 1986. The listing included four contributing buildings on 44 acres (18 ha), on a land parcel of about 1,000 acres (4.0 km^{2}).

The house was built around 1920. It is "a rambling twelve room clapboard bungalow little changed since c.1920. It has a hipped roof with broad eaves and a shed dormer decorated with angular brackets. The exterior is clapboard irregularly fenestrated with 6/6 wooden sash windows. There are four exterior brick chimneys. Two board and batten 'cabins' adjoin the rear with gabled and shed additions to the west end."

It is also known as the L.L. Dean House and was known in the 1800s as Welch Spring.

Other parts of the estate are older. The listing includes a rammed earth smokehouse.

The original settler, Daniel Welch was living on this property by 1831. The Averiett estate as a whole once had more than 10,000 acres (16 sq mi).

This was listed along with three other properties as part of a study of the estate.

It is located about 8 miles (13 km) southwest of Sylacauga on the north side of Alabama State Route 8, in the Fayetteville, Alabama community.

== See also ==
- Benjamin H. Averiett House
- William Averiett House
- Goodwin-Hamilton House
