= Capitol City Plume Superfund site =

Area of contaminated groundwater in Alabama, US

Capitol City Plume (also referred to as Capital City Plume)
- Superfund site
- Location within Alabama
- Location: Montgomery, Montgomery, Alabama; 32.382°N 86.306°W

Information
- CERCLIS ID: AL0001058056
- Contaminants: Benzene; Ethylbenzene; Tetrachloroethylene; Toluene; Trichloroethylene; Xylene

Progress
- Proposed: May 11, 2000

The Capitol City Plume, which also is referred to as the Capital City Plume, is an area of contaminated groundwater located beneath the western downtown area of Montgomery, Alabama. The contamination was discovered in 1993 by the Alabama Department of Environmental Management (ADEM) which was investigating soil contamination at the Retirement Systems of Alabama Energy Plant in the city. After assessment by the United States Environmental Protection Agency (EPA) it was proposed for inclusion in the National Priorities List (NPL) in May 2000.

The City of Montgomery managed to keep the site off of the NPL, eliminating the possibility that it could be labeled a superfund site, by taking fiscal responsibility for the site and its cleanup. The mayor of Montgomery called for a creation of the Downtown Environmental Alliance (Alliance), which would be responsible for planning and undertaking the cleanup costs of the contaminated site. The agreement between the City of Montgomery and the EPA is historically significant and groundbreaking because the parties who are going to pay for the cleanup costs have voluntarily joined the Alliance. The city of Montgomery serves as a model to other cities when faced with similar situations. The site does not affect drinking water. The ongoing assessment will evaluate the potential for soil vapor intrusion. From October 1, 2015, to November 15, 2015, nominations were being accepted for 10 membership spots in a Community Outreach Group (COG). COG will work with the Alliance and the local community as changes continue to be discussed and implemented. The 10 members of the COG will attend community meetings and aid in generating ideas on how to move forward with the plume site.

== History ==
The contamination that makes up The Plume was discovered in 1993 during construction of the Retirement Systems of Alabama (RSA) Tower energy plant. In the late 1990s the Environmental Protection Agency (EPA) became involved, and in 2000 the EPA proposed that the Capital City Plume Site be put on the National Priorities List (NPL). Although proposed, Capital City Plume never made it onto the NPL because the Alliance, an organization developed by the city, agreed to address the site effectively and in a timely manner.

The first step the city took was in developing the Alliance. The Alliance is composed of governmental agencies including the City of Montgomery, Montgomery County, Montgomery Water Works and Sanitary Sewer Board, the State of Alabama, and the Montgomery Advertiser who will be working in accordance with the Alabama Department of Environmental Management requirements. The Alliance has agreed to pay back 2.6 million dollars to the EPA, which is part of what was spent investigating the area over nearly 20 years.

Through testing, the EPA named the Montgomery Advertiser and the state agencies as potential responsible parties. Independent tests from Montgomery Advertiser's consultant had different conclusions than the EPA and pointed to nearby gas stations and dry cleaners as the culprits of the environmental contamination. Their President and Publisher stated that regardless of who was responsible, the issue and focus now had to be on the cleanup and the bettering of the city environmentally. The city of Montgomery accepted public comments for a period of 30 days following their initial acceptance of the terms from the EPA, and during those 30 days, from July 30, 2015, to August 31, 2015, the comments would be considered in any modifications or amendments to the agreement.

== Site testing ==
From 2008 to 2010 the United States Geological Surveys' Alabama and South Carolina Water Science Centers conducted tests on numerous things in and around the site of the plume in downtown Montgomery. Contaminants had been found in groundwater, so the tests were conducted to reveal where the source of contamination was stemming from as well as the pathways the contamination was taking underground. Additionally, the U.S. Geological Survey (USGS) aimed to discover when the contamination occurred. In order to find answers to these questions the USGS conducted many tests and methods of sampling including but not limited to sampling of creek water, ground water, trees, and soil. The USGS also looked at how the land was historically used so that a correlation could be drawn between locations of high concentrations of chemicals and the source polluters. Scientists used passive-diffusion bag samplers to collect pore water from Cypress Creek and groundwater from other locations, which would provide data and concentration levels of the contaminants in the creek. Scientists also took tissue samples from trees that were growing along the Alabama River, Cypress Creek, and downtown Montgomery so that the analysis and data could give a better idea of the big picture and the true reach of the pollution.

The tests concluded that the aquifer residing below the Capital City Plume site was contaminated with perchloroethylene (PCE) and trichloroethylene (TCE) and that the contamination was likely caused by the commercial printing industry that resided in downtown Montgomery in the late 1800s and early 1900s. The USGS scientists also concluded that the contamination likely was attributed to wastewater containing chlorinated solvents that had gotten into stormwater systems, thus polluting the aquifer.

== Redevelopment activities ==
As part of the remediation action, the City of Montgomery planted two acres of poplar trees, which take up and break down contaminants from shallow groundwater through their roots. The Alliance has submitted a work plan to complete the assessment of the plume area. During the years of analysis and cleanup, the downtown area has remained open for business and redevelopment. This includes the building of a new Riverfront Amphitheater, a Conference Complex, and parks and attracting new retail outlets, housing, offices, and industry.

== See also ==
- Groundwater remediation
- Rhizofiltration
