= Goodwin-Hamilton House =

- U.S. National Register of Historic Places
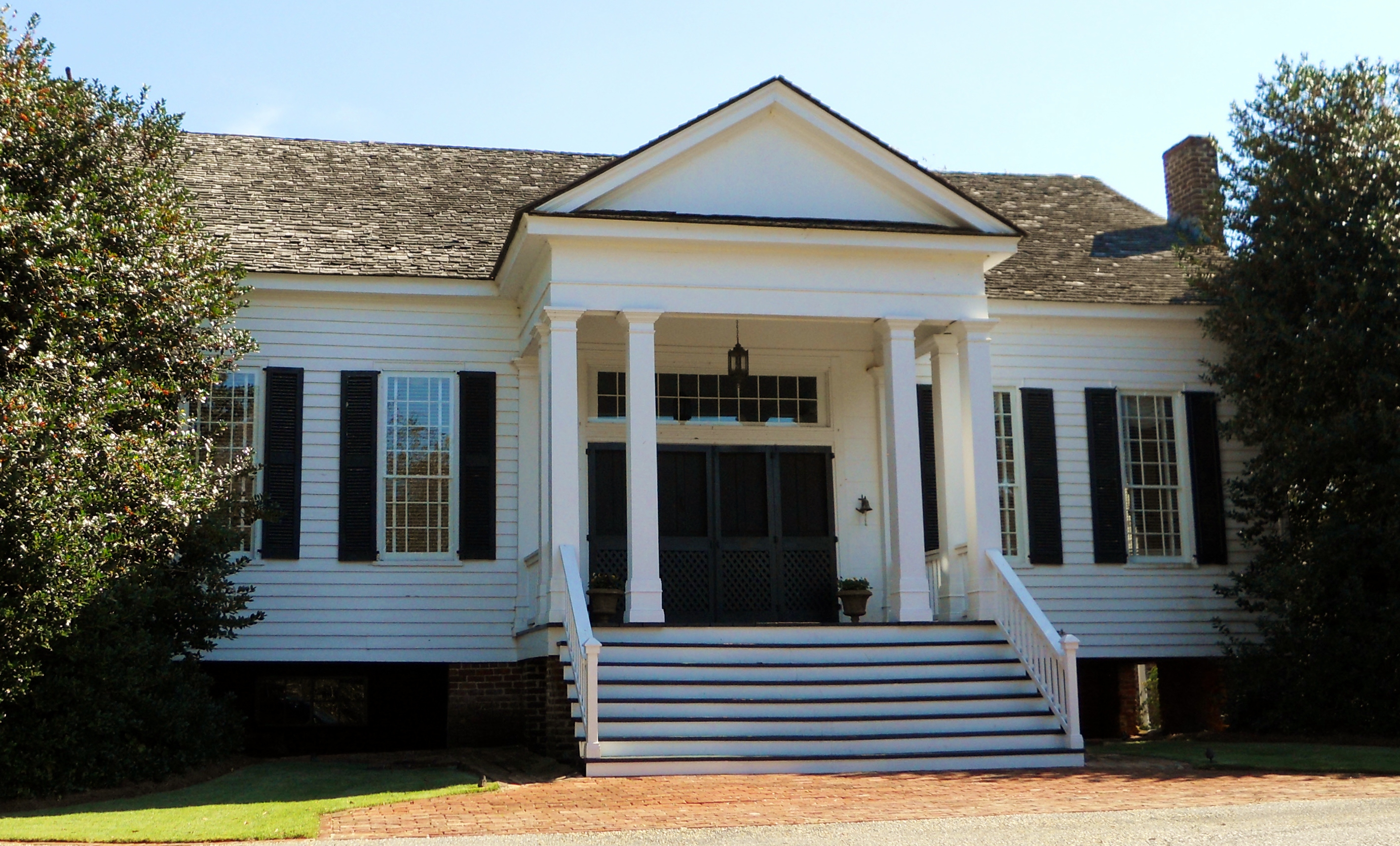

- Location within Alabama
- Nearest city: Sylacauga, Alabama
- Coordinates: 33°07′03″N 86°24′46″W
- Area: 22 acres (8.9 ha)
- Built: c.1850
- Architectural style: Greek Revival
- MPS: Benjamin H. Averiett Houses TR
- NRHP reference No.: 86002041
- Added to NRHP: August 28, 1986

The Goodwin-Hamilton House, near Sylacauga, Alabama, is a Greek Revival style house built around 1850. It was listed on the National Register of Historic Places in 1986. The listing included two contributing buildings on 22 acres (8.9 ha).

It has also been known as The Hamilton Place.

The Averiett estate as a whole once had more than 10,000 acres (16 sq mi).

This was listed along with three other properties as part of a study of the estate.

It is located about 2 miles (3.2 km) south of Alabama State Route 8 on the east side of Marble Valley Road, in the Fayetteville, Alabama community.

== See also ==
- Benjamin H. Averiett House
- William Averiett House
- Welch-Averiett House
