= Hexachloride =

A hexachloride is a compound or ion that contains six chlorine atoms or ions. It is the highest chloride that an element can form. Common hexachlorides include:

- Molybdenum hexachloride, MoCl_{6}
- Tungsten hexachloride, WCl_{6}
- Rhenium hexachloride, ReCl_{6}
- Uranium hexachloride, UCl_{6}

Some hexachloroanions are also known:

- Hexachloroaluminate [AlCl_{6}]^{3−}
- Hexachloroarsenate(V) [AsCl_{6}]^{−}
- Hexachlorocuprate(II) [CuCl_{6}]^{4−}
- Hexachlorogermanate(IV) [GeCl_{6}]^{2−}
- Hexachlorophosphate(V) [PCl_{6}]^{−}
- Hexachloroplatinate(IV) [PtCl_{6}]^{2−}
- Hexachlorothallate(III) [TlCl_{6}]^{3−}
