= Curry, Talladega County, Alabama =

Curry, Alabama
- Unincorporated community
- Location within Alabama Location within the United States
- Coordinates: 33°29′11″N 86°01′02″W
- Country: United States
- State: Alabama
- County: Talladega
- Elevation: 538 ft (164 m)
- Time zone: UTC-6 (Central (CST))
  - Summer (DST): UTC-5 (CDT)
- Area codes: 256 & 938
- GNIS feature ID: 159473

Curry is an unincorporated community in Talladega County, Alabama, United States, located on Alabama State Route 21, 6.2 miles (10.0 km) northeast of Talladega.
