= Quintard Mall =

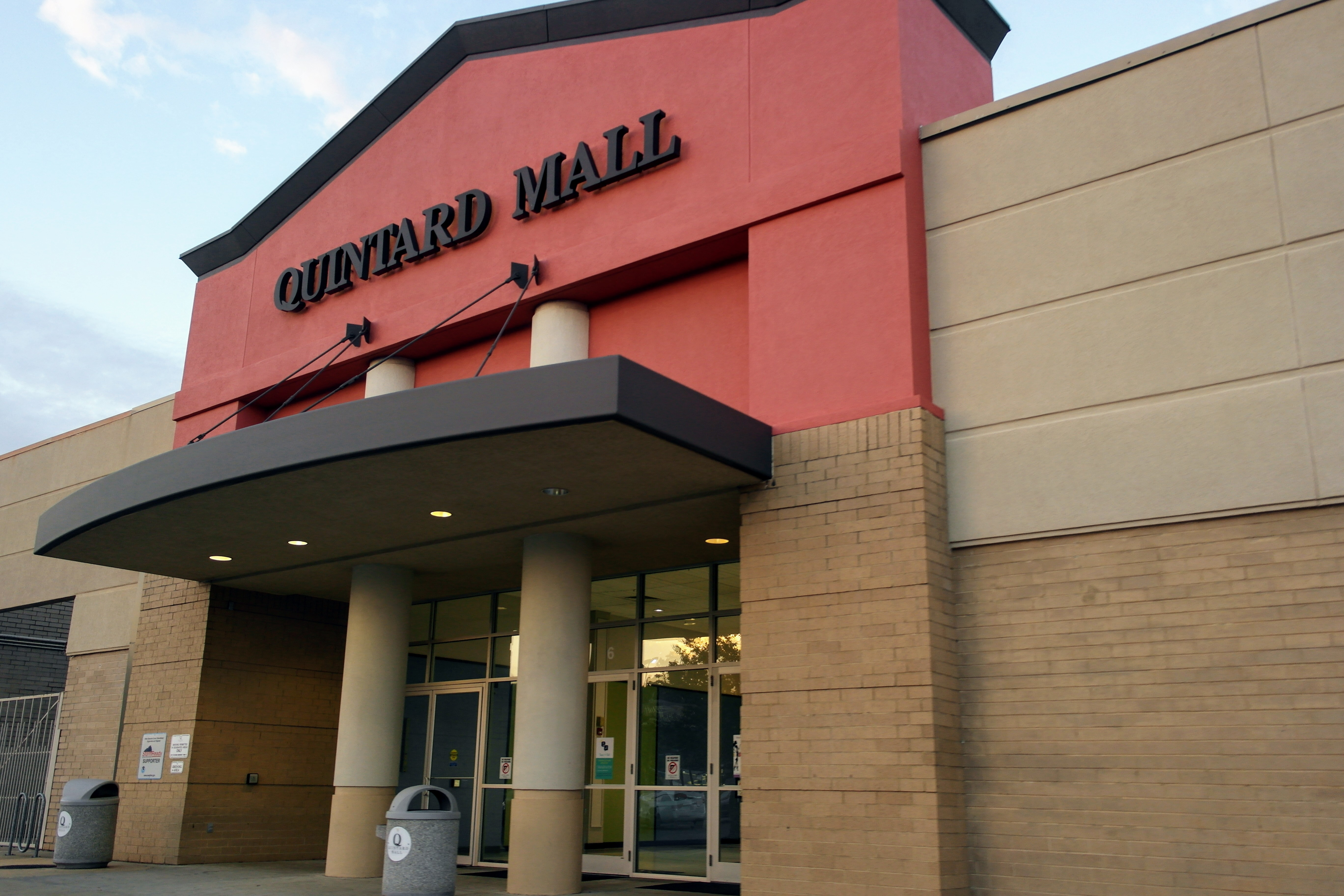
- Location: 700 Quintard Dr. Oxford, Alabama, U.S.
- Coordinates: 33.613397°N 85.824165°W
- Opened: August 1970
- Developer: James A. Grimmer
- Manager: Hull Property Group
- Num. of stores: Approx. 70
- Num. of anchor tenants: 3 (2 open, 1 demolished)
- Floor area: 720,000 square feet (67,000 m^{2})
- Floors: 1 (2 in Dillard's and former Sears)
- Website: shopquintardmall.com

Quintard Mall is an enclosed shopping mall located in Oxford, Alabama, United States. Opened in 1970 and expanded in 2000, it has 720,000 square feet (67,000 m^{2}) of retail space. Quintard Mall's anchor stores are Dillard's and JCPenney, the mall also has a movie theatre, AmStar Oxford by Santikos.

== History ==
Quintard Mall was developed by James A. Grimmer and opened in August 1970. At that time, the mall included thirty-two inline tenants and two anchor stores: JCPenney and Britt's Department Store, the department store division of J.J. Newberry. The Britt's store was closed in the early 1980s and replaced with Sears, which expanded the Britt's building in 1997.

Expansion plans were first announced in the mid-1990s. These plans were complicated by the presence of Snow Creek, a drainage ditch which had to be covered so that the mall expansion could be built over it, and it took the developer seven years to satisfy all of the environmental permits. Also, the historic Dudley Snow House needed to be relocated to nearby Talladega County. Finally, the originally-planned third anchor, Gayfers, was acquired by Dillard's in 1998, further delaying the construction of mall expansion.

The expanded wing finally opened in 2000, featuring Dillard's as well as a food court and movie theater. Goody's was added in 2006, and liquidated in early 2009 when the chain closed. The store reopened in March 2010. On April 22, 2016, Sears announced that 68 Kmart stores and 10 Sears stores would be closing in July 2016, including their Quintard Mall location. In 2019, the mall began major renovations to transition into a lifestyle center, including overhaul of the interior spaces, conversion of some stores to external entrances, outparcel development, and demolition of the former Britt's/Sears building.
