= Childersburg, Alabama =

City in Alabama, United States

- City
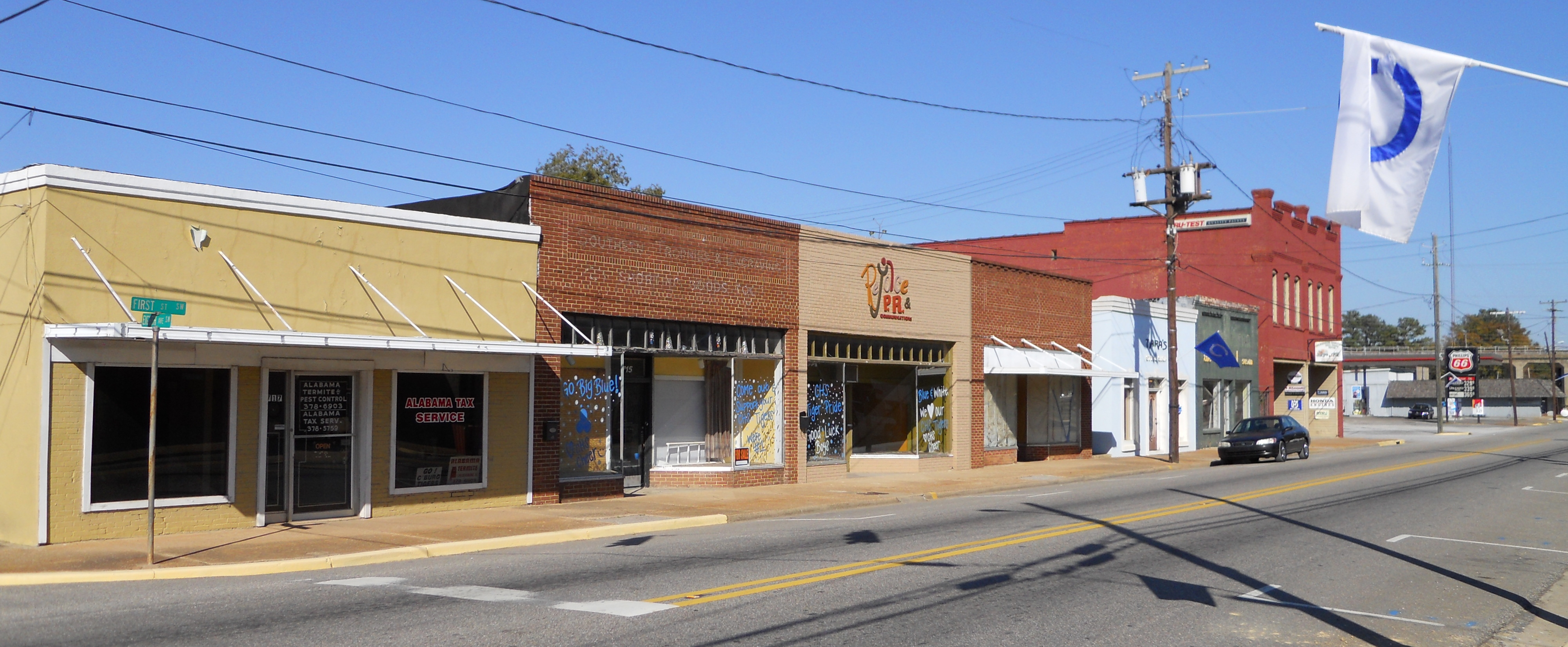
- Downtown Childersburg

- Flag Logo

- Location of Childersburg in Talladega County, Alabama.
- Coordinates: 33°16′12″N 86°21′30″W
- Country: United States
- State: Alabama
- County: Talladega

Area
  - Total: 12.58 sq mi (32.59 km^{2})
  - Land: 12.33 sq mi (31.94 km^{2})
  - Water: 0.25 sq mi (0.65 km^{2})
- Elevation: 456 ft (139 m)

Population (2020)
  - Total: 4,754
  - Density: 385.5/sq mi (148.86/km^{2})
- Time zone: UTC-6 (Central (CST))
  - Summer (DST): UTC-5 (CDT)
- ZIP code: 35044
- Area code: 256
- FIPS code: 01-14464
- GNIS feature ID: 2404048
- Website: www.childersburg.org

Childersburg is a city in Talladega County in the U.S. state of Alabama. It was incorporated in 1889. At the 2020 census, the population was 4,754. It has a history dating back before 1540, when it was noted as a village of the Coosa Nation visited by the Spanish explorer Hernando de Soto. It is said a member of De Soto's crew fell ill and was left to settle in the area of present-day Childersburg where the Coosa people cared for the ill explorer. The Alabama Army Ammunition Plant, important during World War II, was located 4 miles (6 km) north of Childersburg.

== Geography ==
According to the U.S. Census Bureau, the city has a total area of 12.6 square miles (32.6 km^{2}), of which 12.4 square miles (32.0 km^{2}) is land and 0.27 square miles (0.7 km^{2}), or 2.00%, is water.

The city is located along the Coosa River in western Talladega County along US Routes 280 and 231. US 280 and 231 run northwest to southeast through the city, leading northwest 7 mi (11 km) to Harpersville, where they split, and US 280 continues 37 mi (60 km) to Birmingham. US 231/280 also run southeast 11 mi (18 km) to Sylacauga. Alabama Route 76 also runs through the city, leading east 10 mi (16 km) to Winterboro and southwest 7 mi (11 km) to Alabama Route 25 near Wilsonville.

=== Climate ===
Climate data for Childersburg, Alabama, 1991–2020 normals, extremes 1957–present
Month	Jan	Feb	Mar	Apr	May	Jun	Jul	Aug	Sep	Oct	Nov	Dec	Year
Record high °F (°C)	81 (27)	85 (29)	92 (33)	93 (34)	97 (36)	105 (41)	105 (41)	104 (40)	101 (38)	102 (39)	89 (32)	92 (33)	105 (41)
Mean maximum °F (°C)	73.5 (23.1)	77.0 (25.0)	83.8 (28.8)	87.2 (30.7)	91.8 (33.2)	96.1 (35.6)	98.3 (36.8)	98.1 (36.7)	95.3 (35.2)	89.0 (31.7)	80.7 (27.1)	75.4 (24.1)	99.7 (37.6)
Mean daily maximum °F (°C)	58.4 (14.7)	63.1 (17.3)	71.0 (21.7)	78.6 (25.9)	84.8 (29.3)	90.5 (32.5)	93.1 (33.9)	92.6 (33.7)	88.2 (31.2)	79.2 (26.2)	68.1 (20.1)	60.3 (15.7)	77.3 (25.2)
Daily mean °F (°C)	46.2 (7.9)	50.5 (10.3)	57.1 (13.9)	64.4 (18.0)	71.8 (22.1)	78.5 (25.8)	81.7 (27.6)	80.8 (27.1)	75.6 (24.2)	65.2 (18.4)	54.4 (12.4)	48.3 (9.1)	64.5 (18.1)
Mean daily minimum °F (°C)	34.1 (1.2)	37.8 (3.2)	43.2 (6.2)	50.2 (10.1)	58.8 (14.9)	66.5 (19.2)	70.3 (21.3)	69.0 (20.6)	63.1 (17.3)	51.1 (10.6)	40.8 (4.9)	36.4 (2.4)	51.8 (11.0)
Mean minimum °F (°C)	14.3 (−9.8)	19.3 (−7.1)	23.4 (−4.8)	32.1 (0.1)	41.8 (5.4)	55.0 (12.8)	61.2 (16.2)	58.8 (14.9)	47.5 (8.6)	32.7 (0.4)	23.1 (−4.9)	18.8 (−7.3)	11.9 (−11.2)
Record low °F (°C)	−4 (−20)	4 (−16)	7 (−14)	23 (−5)	33 (1)	41 (5)	51 (11)	47 (8)	34 (1)	22 (−6)	14 (−10)	2 (−17)	−4 (−20)
Average precipitation inches (mm)	5.50 (140)	6.00 (152)	5.38 (137)	4.77 (121)	4.44 (113)	4.52 (115)	4.15 (105)	4.30 (109)	3.74 (95)	3.32 (84)	4.65 (118)	5.20 (132)	55.97 (1,421)
Average snowfall inches (cm)	0.4 (1.0)	0.1 (0.25)	0.6 (1.5)	0.0 (0.0)	0.0 (0.0)	0.0 (0.0)	0.0 (0.0)	0.0 (0.0)	0.0 (0.0)	0.0 (0.0)	0.0 (0.0)	0.0 (0.0)	1.1 (2.75)
Average precipitation days (≥ 0.01 in)	10.5	10.4	10.3	8.9	9.4	11.0	11.2	9.9	7.4	6.8	8.4	11.0	115.2
Average snowy days (≥ 0.1 in)	0.3	0.1	0.0	0.0	0.0	0.0	0.0	0.0	0.0	0.0	0.0	0.0	0.4
Source 1: NOAA
Source 2: National Weather Service

== History ==
Successive indigenous peoples had lived in the area for thousands of years. In the 16th century, people identified as part of the Kymulga-phase culture (of the larger Mississippian culture) lived at Talisi, the former site of Childersburg. In the fall of 1540, the Spanish explorer Hernando de Soto's expedition rested here for about one month during its exploration of the Southeast. Childersburg is the "oldest occupied settlement in America” The Abihka people (part of those who became known as the Muskogee or Creek) dominated the area by the 18th century.

The Alabama Army Ammunition Plant, a munitions plant, was established in Childersburg in 1941 and operated throughout World War II until August 1945. Operated by DuPont, the plant produced explosives, such as nitrocellulose, trinitrotoluene (TNT), and dinitrotoluene (DNT). The plant also secretly produced heavy water to support the Manhattan Project. In 1940 the town had about five hundred people. Over fourteen thousand workers came to build and later operate the new facility.

== Demographics ==
Historical population
Census	Pop.	Note	%±
1890	777		—
1900	372		−52.1%
1910	449		20.7%
1920	418		−6.9%
1930	459		9.8%
1940	515		12.2%
1950	4,023		681.2%
1960	4,884		21.4%
1970	4,831		−1.1%
1980	5,080		5.2%
1990	4,579		−9.9%
2000	4,927		7.6%
2010	5,175		5.0%
2020	4,754		−8.1%
U.S. Decennial Census; 2013 Estimate

=== Racial and ethnic composition ===
Childersburg city, Alabama – Racial and ethnic composition Note: the US Census treats Hispanic/Latino as an ethnic category. This table excludes Latinos from the racial categories and assigns them to a separate category. Hispanics/Latinos may be of any race.
Race / Ethnicity (NH = Non-Hispanic)	Pop 1980	Pop 1990	Pop 2000	Pop 2010	Pop 2020	% 1980	% 1990	% 2000	% 2010	% 2020
White alone (NH)	3,711	3,412	3,377	3,071	2,594	73.05%	74.51%	68.54%	59.34%	54.56%
Black or African American alone (NH)	1,329	1,147	1,460	1,905	1,927	26.16%	25.05%	29.63%	36.81%	40.53%
Native American or Alaska Native alone (NH)	0	1	16	20	8	0.00%	0.02%	0.32%	0.39%	0.17%
Asian alone (NH)	0	7	3	24	20	0.00%	0.15%	0.06%	0.46%	0.42%
Native Hawaiian or Pacific Islander alone (NH)	x	x	1	0	1	x	x	0.02%	0.00%	0.02%
Other race alone (NH)	0	0	5	4	8	0.00%	0.00%	0.10%	0.08%	0.17%
Mixed race or Multiracial (NH)	x	x	35	85	122	x	x	0.71%	1.64%	2.57%
Hispanic or Latino (any race)	40	12	30	66	74	0.79%	0.26%	0.61%	1.28%	1.56%
Total	5,080	4,579	4,927	5,175	4,754	100.00%	100.00%	100.00%	100.00%	100.00%

=== 2020 census ===
As of the 2020 census, Childersburg had a population of 4,754. There were 1,284 families residing in the city. The median age was 40.7 years. 22.3% of residents were under the age of 18 and 18.5% of residents were 65 years of age or older. For every 100 females there were 84.8 males, and for every 100 females age 18 and over there were 82.5 males age 18 and over.

91.8% of residents lived in urban areas, while 8.2% lived in rural areas.

There were 2,079 households in Childersburg, of which 30.7% had children under the age of 18 living in them. Of all households, 36.7% were married-couple households, 20.2% were households with a male householder and no spouse or partner present, and 37.9% were households with a female householder and no spouse or partner present. About 32.6% of all households were made up of individuals and 12.9% had someone living alone who was 65 years of age or older.

There were 2,284 housing units, of which 9.0% were vacant. The homeowner vacancy rate was 2.1% and the rental vacancy rate was 6.0%.

=== 2010 census ===
At the 2010 census, there were 5,175 people, 2,090 households and 1,422 families in the city. The population density was 417.3 inhabitants per square mile (161.1/km^{2}). There were 2,356 housing units at an average density of 190 per square mile (73/km^{2}). The racial makeup of the city was 60.1% White, 36.9% Black or African American, 0.4% Native American, 0.5% Asian, 0.0% Pacific Islander, 0.3% from other races, and 1.8% from two or more races. 1.3% of the population were Hispanic or Latino of any race.

Of the 2,090 households 29.7% had children under the age of 18 living with them, 41.3% were married couples living together, 22.4% had a female householder with no husband present, and 32.0% were non-families. 28.8% of households were one person and 11.9% were one person aged 65 or older. The average household size was 2.48 and the average family size was 3.04

The age distribution was 26.4% under the age of 18, 9.6% from 18 to 24, 24.9% from 25 to 44, 24.0% from 45 to 64, and 15.1% 65 or older. The median age was 36.5 years. For every 100 females, there were 82.5 males. For every 100 females age 18 and over, there were 79.8 males.

The median household income was $38,310 and the median family income was $41,646. Males had a median income of $43,333 versus $25,450 for females. The per capita income for the city was $20,221. About 14.8% of families and 14.2% of the population were below the poverty line, including 18.4% of those under age 18 and 24.8% of those age 65 or over.

=== 2000 census ===
At the 2000 census, there were 4,927 people living in the city, an increase over the 1990 population of 4,600. In 2000, there were 1,999 households and 1,419 families in the city. The population density was 637.2 inhabitants per square mile (246.0/km^{2}). There were 2,149 housing units at an average density of 277.9 per square mile (107.3/km^{2}). The racial makeup of the city was 68.87% White, 29.73% Black or African American, 0.32% Native American, 0.06% Asian, 0.02% Pacific Islander, 0.26% from other races, and 0.73% from two or more races. 0.61% of the population were Hispanic or Latino of any race.

Of the 1,999 households 32.7% had children under the age of 18 living with them, 49.2% were married couples living together, 17.8% had a female householder with no husband present, and 29.0% were non-families. 27.4% of households were one person and 13.7% were one person aged 65 or older. The average household size was 2.46 and the average family size was 2.98.

The age distribution was 27.0% under the age of 18, 9.3% from 18 to 24, 26.4% from 25 to 44, 22.1% from 45 to 64, and 15.3% 65 or older. The median age was 36 years. For every 100 females, there were 84.1 males. For every 100 females age 18 and over, there were 78.6 males.

The median household income was $23,932 and the median family income was $30,524. Males had a median income of $31,892 versus $20,569 for females. The per capita income for the city was $15,412. About 20.7% of families and 23.8% of the population were below the poverty line, including 33.6% of those under age 18 and 19.9% of those age 65 or over.

== Recreation ==
There are ten golf courses in Childersburg and its immediate vicinity.

Childersburg is home to the Childersburg Tigers. 1967, 1977, 2002, and 2007 Alabama Baseball State Champions. Childersburg has won numerous youth baseball state championships including Cal Ripken, Babe Ruth and most recently (2013) American Legion.

Majestic Caverns is also located in Childersburg.

== Notable people ==
- L. Zenobia Coleman (1898–1999) - librarian
- Walton Cruise, professional baseball player
- Joshua B. Lee, represented Oklahoma as a United States representative and United States senator
- A. J. Smitherman (1885–1961), lawyer, businessman and editor of the black-owned newspaper, Tulsa Star
- Gerald Wallace, professional basketball player
- Zelous Wheeler, professional baseball player
- Polly Holliday (192-2025), professional Golden Globe winning actress, most notable for her role on the American sitcom "Alice", where she portrayed a server named Florence Jean "Flo" Castleberry known for her famous line "Kiss my grits!"

== Gallery ==
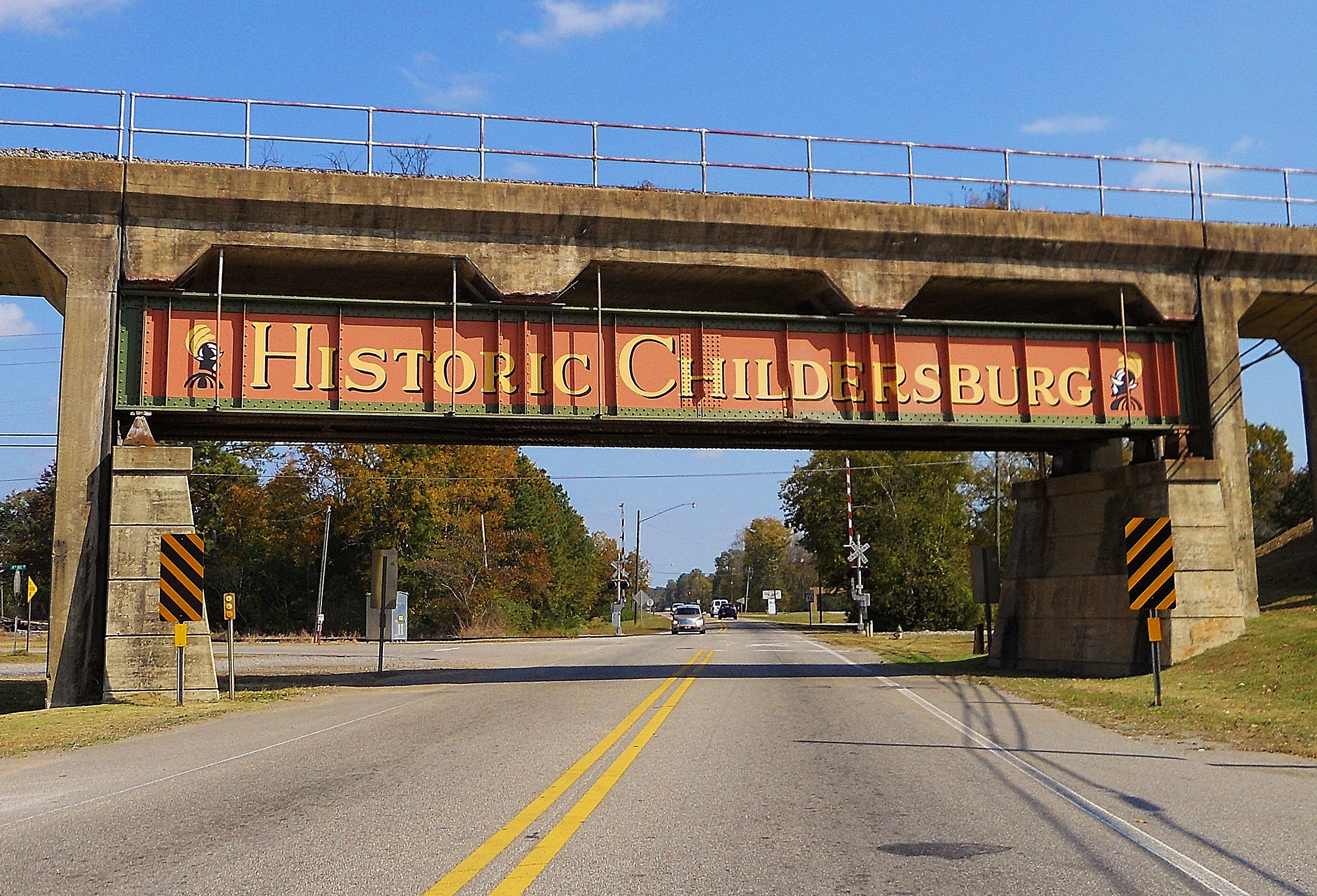
Welcome to Historic Childersburg

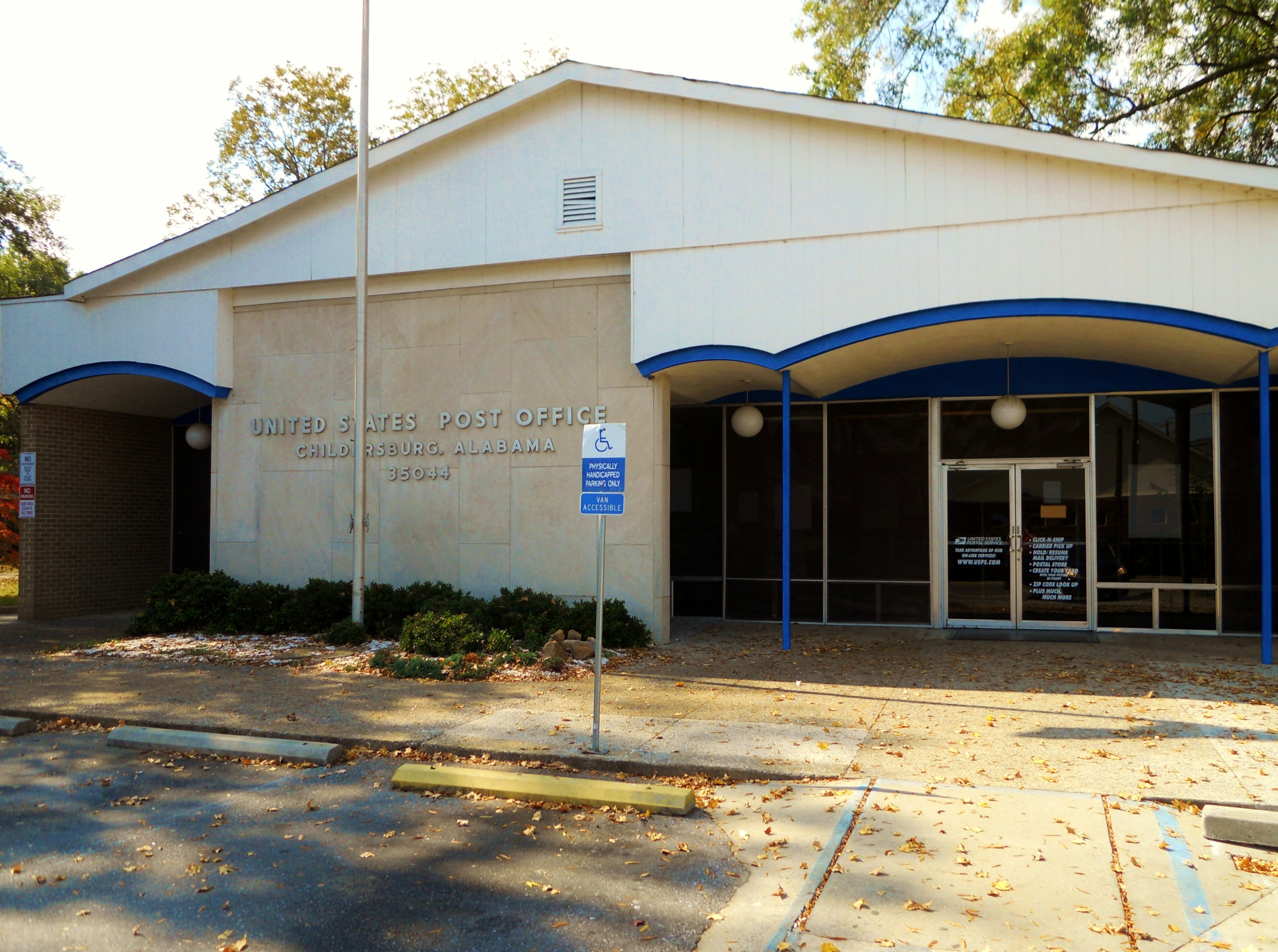
Childersburg Post Office (ZIP code: 35044)

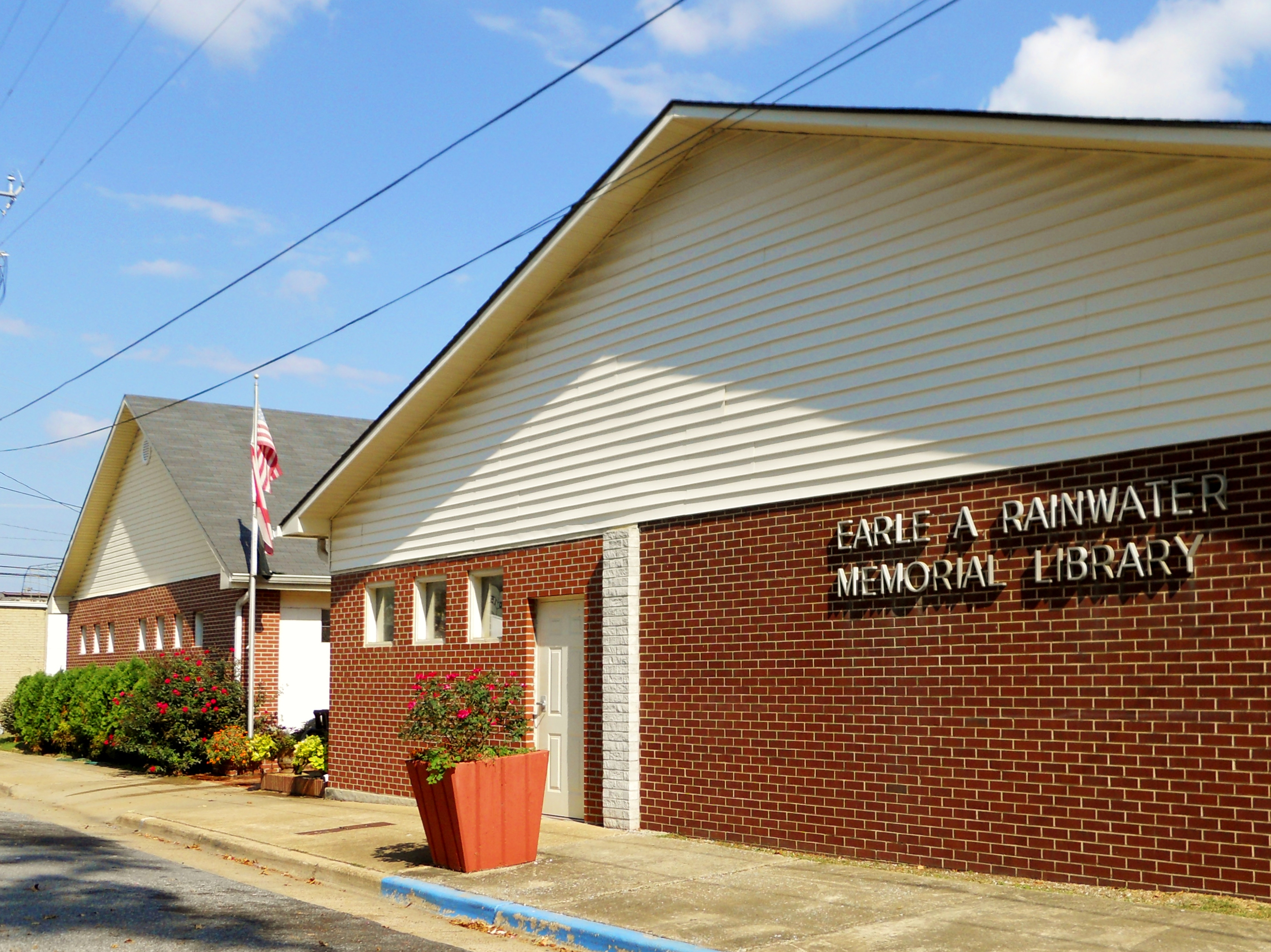
Earle A. Rainwater Memorial Library

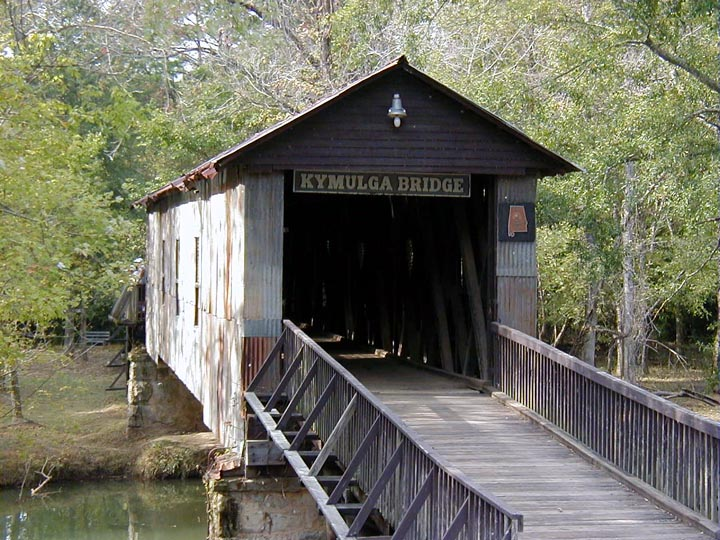
The Kymulga Mill and Covered Bridge Park is located 4.5 miles (7.2 km) northeast of Childersburg on State Route 46. The site was added to the National Register of Historic Places on October 29, 1976.

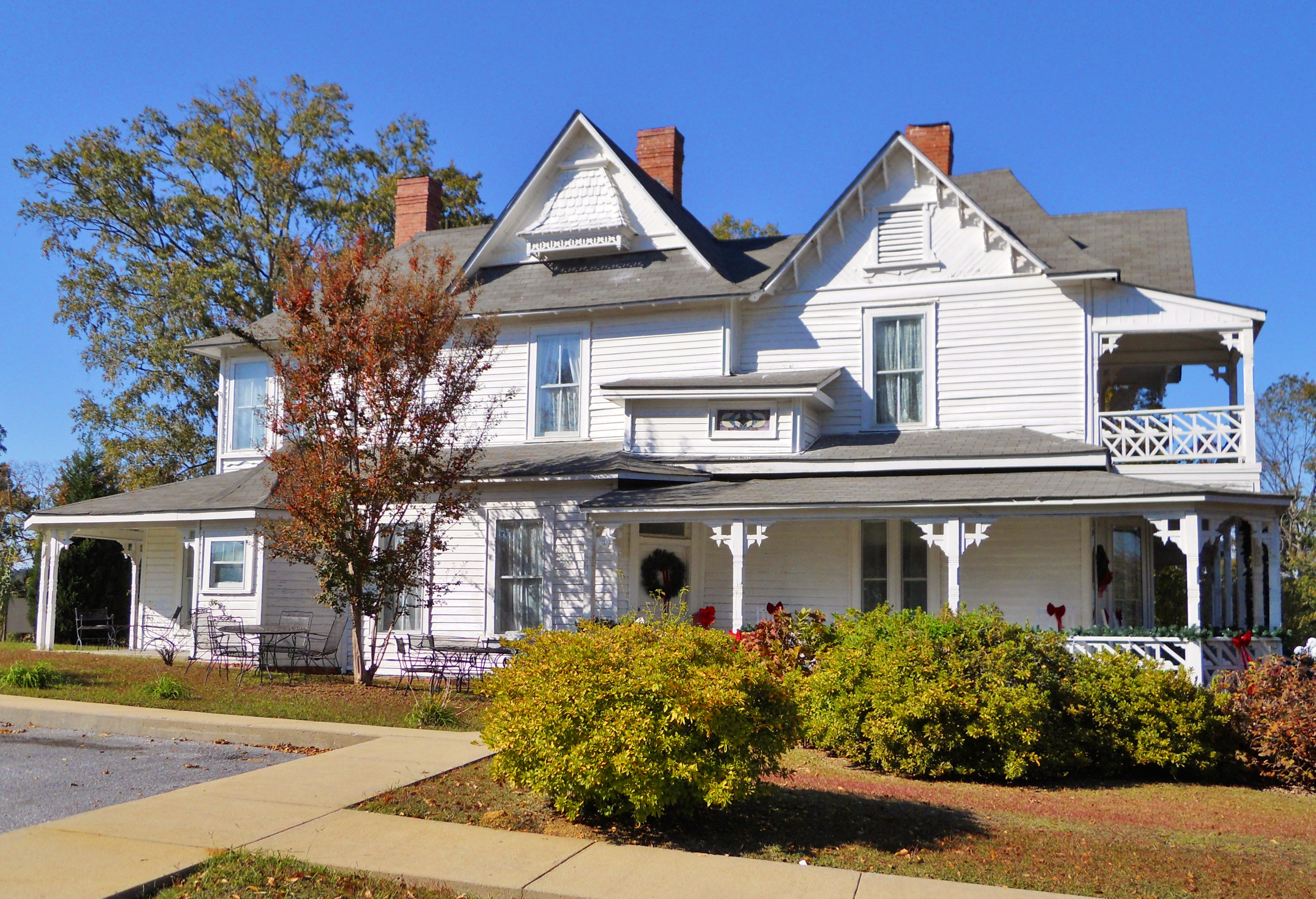
The Charles Butler House was added to the National Register of Historic Places on February 26, 1996.

== Transportation ==
Intercity bus service is provided by Greyhound Lines.
