= Winterboro, Alabama =

- Unincorporated community
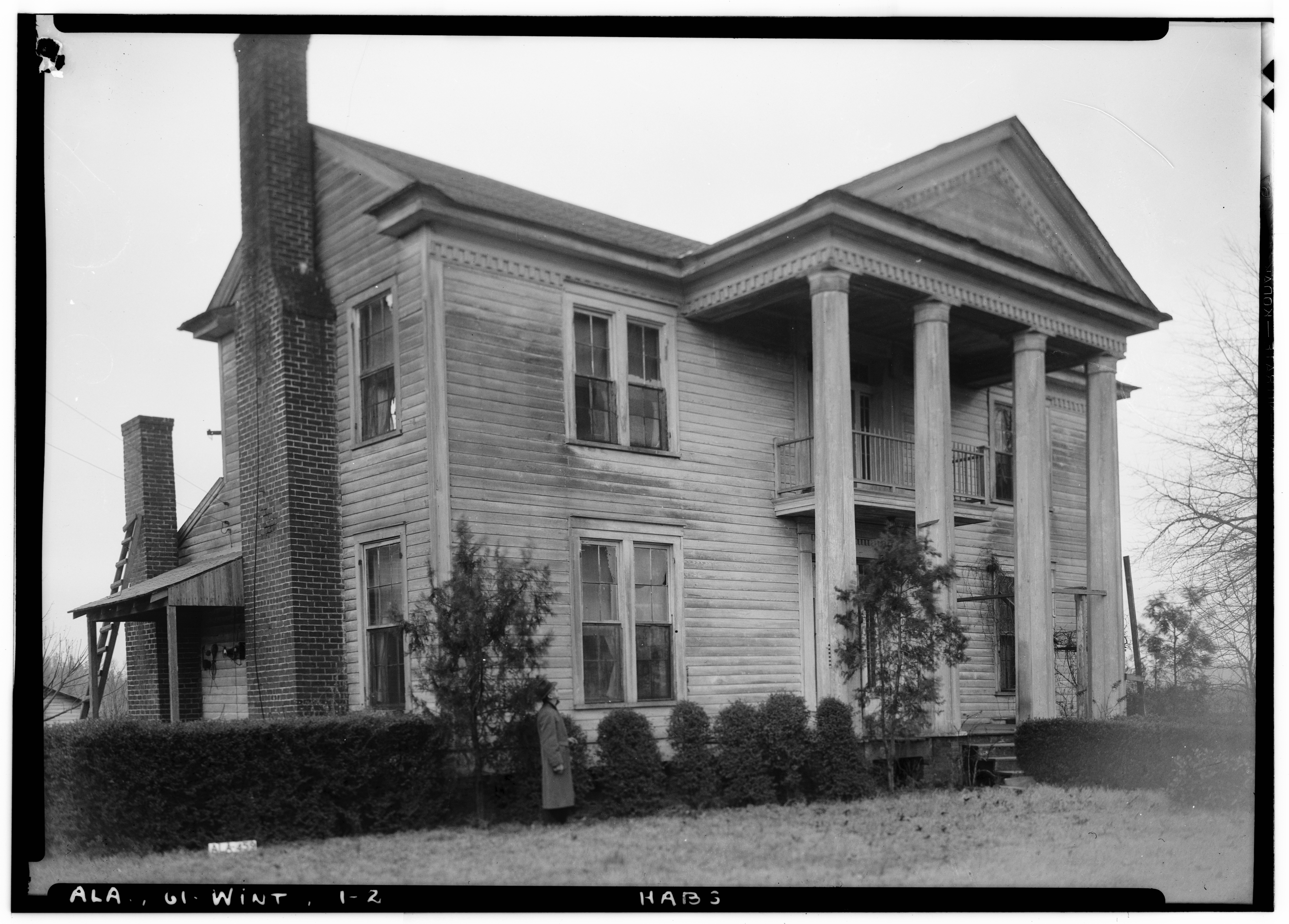
- Morriss-Holmes House, taken in 1937 as part of the Historic American Buildings Survey

- Location within Alabama Location within the United States
- Coordinates: 33°19′17″N 86°11′49″W
- Country: United States
- State: Alabama
- County: Talladega
- Elevation: 509 ft (155 m)
- Time zone: UTC-6 (Central (CST))
  - Summer (DST): UTC-5 (CDT)
- Area codes: 256 & 938
- GNIS feature ID: 129128

Winterboro, also spelled Winterborough, is an unincorporated community in Talladega County, Alabama, United States.

== History ==
The state of Alabama incorporated the Central Plank Road on January 30, 1850. It was planned to run from Montgomery to Guntersville via Talladega. Joseph Winter planned the road, but the people of Talladega did not give him their expected financial support. As a consequence, Winter ended the plank road at Winterboro and named the settlement for himself. A post office called Winterboro was established in 1853 and remained in operation until 1875. During the Great Depression, the Civilian Conservation Corps cleared brush from pastures around Winterboro. Today, Winterboro is at the junction of Alabama State Route 21 and Alabama State Route 76.

One structure in Winterboro, the Winterboro Stagecoach Inn, is listed on the National Register of Historic Places.

== Geography ==
Winterboro is located in the east central part of the state at 33° 19′ 17″ N, 86° 11′ 49″ W (33.321389 N, -86.196944 W). Alabama State Routes 21 and 76 meet in the community, with AL-21 leading northeast 10 mi (16 km) to Talladega, the county seat, and southwest 11 mi (18 km) to Sylacauga. AL-76 connects the community with Childersburg, 10 mi (16 km) to the southwest.
