= Benjamin H. Averiett House =

- U.S. National Register of Historic Places
- Location within Alabama
- Nearest city: Sylacauga, Alabama
- Coordinates: 33°08′25″N 86°22′21″W
- Area: 605 acres (2.45 km^{2})
- Built: 1835
- Architectural style: Georgia Folk House
- MPS: Benjamin H. Averiett Houses TR
- NRHP reference No.: 86002034
- Added to NRHP: August 28, 1986

The Benjamin H. Averiett House, near Sylacauga, Alabama, was listed on the National Register of Historic Places in 1986. The listing included three contributing buildings on 605 acres (2.45 km^{2}).

This property has also been known as the Hudson Hamilton Place. It includes "Georgia Folk House" architecture. (Note: The NRHP nomination document for this property is not available online from the National Park Service, due to an error.)

The Averiett estate had more than 10,000 acres (16 sq mi).

This was listed along with three other properties as part of a study of the estate.

== See also ==
- William Averiett House
- Goodwin-Hamilton House
- Welch-Averiett House
