= William Averiett House =

- U.S. National Register of Historic Places
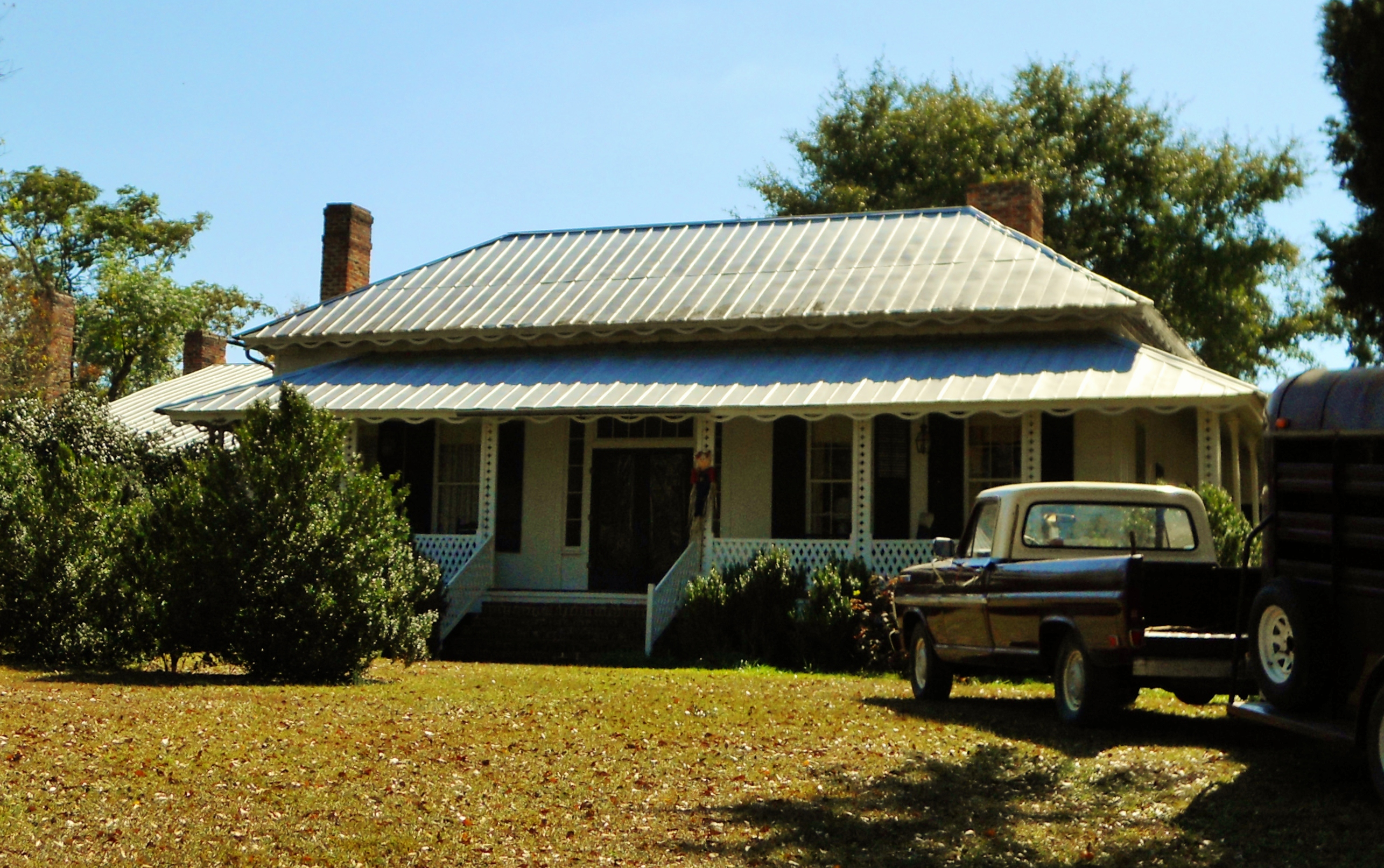

- Location within Alabama
- Nearest city: Sylacauga, Alabama
- Coordinates: 33°08′02″N 86°23′58″W
- Area: 2 acres (0.81 ha)
- Built: 1866-67
- Architectural style: Vernacular Cottage orné
- MPS: Benjamin H. Averiett Houses TR
- NRHP reference No.: 86002038
- Added to NRHP: August 28, 1986

The William Averiett House, near Sylacauga, Alabama, dates from 1866. It was listed on the National Register of Historic Places in 1986. The listing included four contributing buildings on 2 acres (0.81 ha).

It is vernacular Cottage orné in style.

It is also known as The Averiett Place.

It is located on a private road about .5 miles (0.80 km) off Alabama State Route 8.

The Averiett estate as a whole once had more than 10,000 acres (16 sq mi).

This was listed along with three other properties as part of a study of the estate.

== See also ==
- Benjamin H. Averiett House
- Goodwin-Hamilton House
- Welch-Averiett House
