= Fayetteville, Alabama =

- Census-designated place
- Location of Fayetteville in Talladega County, Alabama.
- Coordinates: 33°09′51″N 86°26′30″W
- Country: United States
- State: Alabama
- County: Talladega

Area
  - Total: 19.77 sq mi (51.21 km^{2})
  - Land: 17.44 sq mi (45.18 km^{2})
  - Water: 2.33 sq mi (6.03 km^{2})
- Elevation: 400 ft (120 m)

Population (2020)
  - Total: 1,422
  - Density: 81.5/sq mi (31.48/km^{2})
- Time zone: UTC-6 (Central (CST))
  - Summer (DST): UTC-5 (CDT)
- Area codes: 256 & 938
- GNIS feature ID: 2582674

Fayetteville is a census-designated place and unincorporated community in Talladega County, Alabama, United States. As of the 2020 census, Fayetteville had a population of 1,422.

The following is found on a sign erected by the Alabama Historical Association:

"In 1814, Tennessee Troops joined Andrew Jackson's force which won the Creek Indian War. After Indian removal in 1836, these veterans brought their families here, named this community for their old home in Tennessee. Fayetteville Academy was built in 1850."

In 1920, a new high school was built in the Fayetteville community called Fayetteville High School.

== History ==
In 1814, a Tennessean volunteer army led by then-militia commander Andrew Jackson traveled to the area (then known as Cedar Creek) in order to fight the Muscogee peoples in the Creek War. In fact, their base camp for the war, Fort Williams, was located in the mouth of the Cedar Creek.

With the Muscogee's defeat in the war and retreat east of the Coosa River came treaties signed with the peoples in 1828, relinquishing the area to the United States. Four years later in 1832, the area became part of the newly established Talladega County. After the war's end, many of those in the volunteer army stayed and settled in the area, naming it after their native Fayetteville, Tennessee.

The community grew in the following century, with the establishment of the Fayetteville Post Office in 1837. The first school in the community, the Fayetteville Male and Female Academy, incorporated in 1859.

== Demographics ==
Historical population
Census	Pop.	Note	%±
2010	1,284		—
2020	1,422		10.7%
U.S. Decennial Census

Fayetteville was first listed as a census designated place in the 2010 U.S. census.

=== Racial and ethnic composition ===
Fairford CDP, Alabama – Racial and ethnic composition Note: the US Census treats Hispanic/Latino as an ethnic category. This table excludes Latinos from the racial categories and assigns them to a separate category. Hispanics/Latinos may be of any race.
Race / Ethnicity (NH = Non-Hispanic)	Pop 2010	Pop 2020	% 2010	% 2020
White alone (NH)	1,245	1,349	96.96%	94.87%
Black or African American alone (NH)	17	14	1.32%	0.98%
Native American or Alaska Native alone (NH)	4	2	0.31%	0.14%
Asian alone (NH)	0	3	0.00%	0.21%
Native Hawaiian or Pacific Islander alone (NH)	0	0	0.00%	0.00%
Other race alone (NH)	0	2	0.00%	0.14%
Mixed race or Multiracial (NH)	14	32	1.09%	2.25%
Hispanic or Latino (any race)	4	20	0.31%	1.41%
Total	1,284	1,422	100.00%	100.00%

=== 2020 census ===
As of the 2020 census, Fayetteville had a population of 1,422. The median age was 47.8 years. 19.4% of residents were under the age of 18 and 24.3% of residents were 65 years of age or older. For every 100 females there were 105.5 males, and for every 100 females age 18 and over there were 101.1 males age 18 and over.

0.0% of residents lived in urban areas, while 100.0% lived in rural areas.

There were 563 households in Fayetteville, of which 25.8% had children under the age of 18 living in them. Of all households, 63.1% were married-couple households, 16.9% were households with a male householder and no spouse or partner present, and 16.5% were households with a female householder and no spouse or partner present. About 21.3% of all households were made up of individuals and 11.9% had someone living alone who was 65 years of age or older.

There were 649 housing units, of which 13.3% were vacant. The homeowner vacancy rate was 0.0% and the rental vacancy rate was 6.0%.
