= Talladega County, Alabama =

County in Alabama, United States

- County
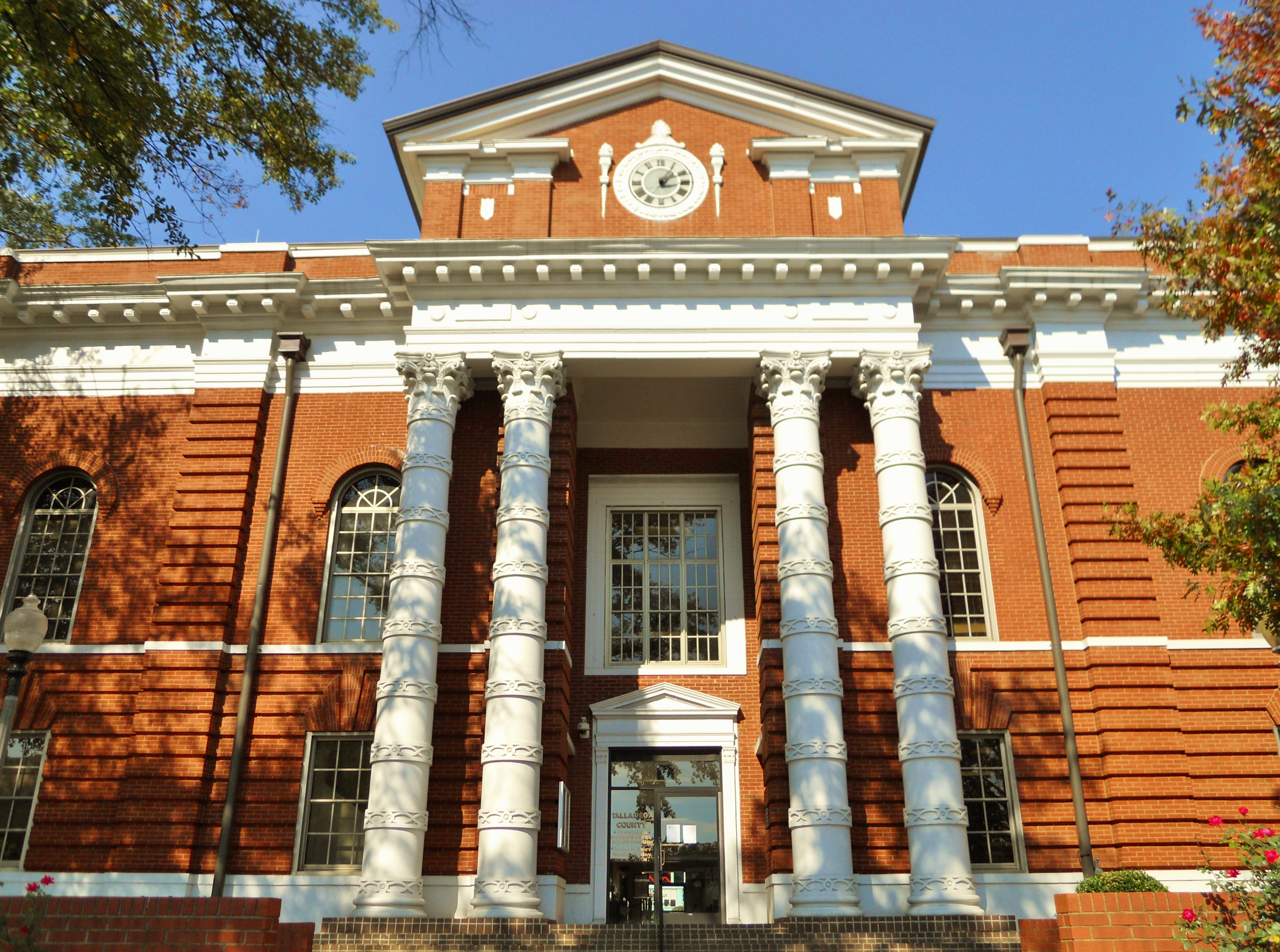
- Talladega County Courthouse in Talladega

- Logo
- Motto: "Something For Everyone"
- Location within the U.S. state of Alabama
- Coordinates: 33°23′N 86°10′W
- Country: United States
- State: Alabama
- Founded: December 18, 1832
- Named for: Creek for "Border Town"
- Seat: Talladega
- Largest city: Talladega

Area
  - Total: 760 sq mi (2,000 km^{2})
  - Land: 737 sq mi (1,910 km^{2})
  - Water: 24 sq mi (62 km^{2}) 3.1%

Population (2020)
  - Total: 82,149
  - Estimate (2025): 81,603 ▼
  - Density: 111/sq mi (43.0/km^{2})
- Time zone: UTC−6 (Central)
  - Summer (DST): UTC−5 (CDT)
- Congressional districts: 3rd, 6th
- Website: TalladegaCountyAL.org
- County Number 61 on Alabama Licence Plates

Talladega County is one of sixty-seven counties in the U.S. state of Alabama, located in its east-central portion. As of the 2020 census, the population was 82,149. Its county seat is Talladega.

Talladega County is included in the Talladega-Sylacauga, AL Micropolitan Statistical Area, which is also included in the Birmingham-Cullman-Talladega, AL Combined Statistical Area.

== History ==
Prior to Euro-American settlement in this area, it was occupied by the Abihka tribe of the Creek Confederacy. The United States forced the Creek to agree to treaties by which they ceded their land to the US, ultimately resulting in Indian Removal to west of the Mississippi River, to Indian Territory.

Talladega County was established on December 18, 1832, from land ceded by the Creek Indians near the state's geographic center. The county seat was established at Talladega in 1834.

The name Talladega is derived from a Muscogee (Creek) Native American word Tvlvtēke, from the Muscogee etvlwa, meaning "town", and vtēke, or "border" – "Border Town" – a town indicating its location on the boundary between the lands of the Creek tribe and those of the Cherokee and Chickasaw.

== Geography ==
According to the United States Census Bureau, the county has a total area of 760 square miles (2,000 km^{2}), of which 737 square miles (1,910 km^{2}) is land and 24 square miles (62 km^{2}) (3.1%) is water. It is drained by Choccolocco Creek (archaic spelling: Chockolocko) and other streams. The county is located within the Coosa River Valley and the Ridge-and-Valley Appalachians, with the state's highest point, Mount Cheaha, being located on its northeastern border with Cleburne County.

=== Adjacent counties ===
- Calhoun County – north
- Cleburne County – northeast
- Clay County – east
- Coosa County – south
- Shelby County – southwest
- St. Clair County – northwest

=== National protected area ===
- Talladega National Forest (part)

== Demographics ==
Historical population
Census	Pop.	Note	%±
1840	12,587		—
1850	18,624		48.0%
1860	23,520		26.3%
1870	18,064		−23.2%
1880	23,360		29.3%
1890	29,346		25.6%
1900	35,773		21.9%
1910	37,921		6.0%
1920	41,005		8.1%
1930	45,241		10.3%
1940	51,832		14.6%
1950	63,639		22.8%
1960	65,495		2.9%
1970	65,280		−0.3%
1980	73,826		13.1%
1990	74,107		0.4%
2000	80,321		8.4%
2010	82,291		2.5%
2020	82,149		−0.2%
2025 (est.)	81,603	▼	−0.7%
U.S. Decennial Census; 1790–1960 1900–1990; 1990–2000 2010–2020

=== 2020 census ===
As of the 2020 census, the county had a population of 82,149. The median age was 42.2 years. 20.8% of residents were under the age of 18 and 18.5% of residents were 65 years of age or older. For every 100 females there were 94.4 males, and for every 100 females age 18 and over there were 92.5 males age 18 and over.

The racial makeup of the county was 62.3% White, 32.2% Black or African American, 0.3% American Indian and Alaska Native, 0.5% Asian, 0.0% Native Hawaiian and Pacific Islander, 1.2% from some other race, and 3.5% from two or more races. Hispanic or Latino residents of any race comprised 2.2% of the population.

41.3% of residents lived in urban areas, while 58.7% lived in rural areas.

There were 33,090 households in the county, of which 28.6% had children under the age of 18 living with them and 32.5% had a female householder with no spouse or partner present. About 30.2% of all households were made up of individuals and 12.8% had someone living alone who was 65 years of age or older.

There were 37,948 housing units, of which 12.8% were vacant. Among occupied housing units, 70.3% were owner-occupied and 29.7% were renter-occupied. The homeowner vacancy rate was 1.8% and the rental vacancy rate was 9.2%.

=== Racial and ethnic composition ===
Talladega County, Alabama – Racial and ethnic composition Note: the US Census treats Hispanic/Latino as an ethnic category. This table excludes Latinos from the racial categories and assigns them to a separate category. Hispanics/Latinos may be of any race.
Race / Ethnicity (NH = Non-Hispanic)	Pop. 2000	Pop. 2010	Pop. 2020	% 2000	% 2010	% 2020
White alone (NH)	53,399	53,079	50,732	66.48%	64.50%	61.76%
Black or African American alone (NH)	25,206	25,953	26,340	31.38%	31.54%	32.06%
Native American or Alaska Native alone (NH)	172	230	184	0.21%	0.28%	0.22%
Asian alone (NH)	159	329	395	0.20%	0.40%	0.48%
Pacific Islander alone (NH)	20	6	27	0.02%	0.01%	0.03%
Other race alone (NH)	35	60	206	0.04%	0.07%	0.25%
Mixed race or Multiracial (NH)	518	963	2,486	0.64%	1.17%	3.03%
Hispanic or Latino (any race)	812	1,671	1,779	1.01%	2.03%	2.17%
Total	80,321	80,321	82,149	100.00%	100.00%	100.00%

=== 2010 Census ===
As of the census of 2010, there were 82,291 people, 31,890 households, and 22,191 families living in the county. The population density was 112 inhabitants per square mile (43 inhabitants/km^{2}). There were 37,088 housing units at an average density of 50 units per square mile (19 units/km^{2}). The racial makeup of the county was 65.3% White, 31.7% Black or African American, 0.3% Native American, 0.4% Asian, 0.0% Pacific Islander, 1.0% from other races, and 1.3% from two or more races. Nearly 2.0% of the population were Hispanic or Latino of any race.

There were 31,890 households, out of which 27.8% had children under the age of 18 living with them; 47.2% were married couples living together, 17.5% had a female householder with no husband present, and 30.4% were non-families. 26.7% of all households were made up of individuals, and 10.1% had someone living alone who was 65 years of age or older. The average household size was 2.48, and the average family size was 2.98.

In the county, the population was spread out, with 23.4% under the age of 18, 8.6% from 18 to 24, 25.8% from 25 to 44, 28.1% from 45 to 64, and 14.1% who were 65 years of age or older. The median age was 39.3 years. For every 100 females, there were 94.9 males. For every 100 females age 18 and over, there were 98.1 males.

The median income for a household in the county was $36,948, and the median income for a family was $44,695. Males had a median income of $38,430 versus $27,404 for females. The per capita income for the county was $18,713. About 15.3% of families and 18.4% of the population were below the poverty line, including 27.1% of those under age 18 and 15.7% of those age 65 or over.

=== 2000 Census ===
As of the census of 2000, there were 80,321 people, 30,674 households, and 21,901 families living in the county. The population density was 109 inhabitants per square mile (42 inhabitants/km^{2}). There were 34,469 housing units at an average density of 47 units per square mile (18 units/km^{2}). The racial makeup of the county was 67.02% White, 31.55% Black or African American, 0.23% Native American, 0.20% Asian, 0.02% Pacific Islander, 0.27% from other races, and 0.71% from two or more races. Nearly 1.01% of the population were Hispanic or Latino of any race.

In 2000, the largest ancestry groups in Talladega County were:

- English American 53%
- African American 32%
- Irish American 8.5%
- German American 6%
- Scottish American 2.4%
- Scots-Irish American 2.1%

There were 30,674 households, out of which 32.10% had children under the age of 18 living with them; 52.40% were married couples living together, 15.20% had a female householder with no husband present, and 28.60% were non-families. 25.90% of all households were made up of individuals, and 10.60% had someone living alone who was 65 years of age or older. The average household size was 2.50, and the average family size was 3.00.

In the county, the population was spread out, with 25.00% under the age of 18, 9.00% from 18 to 24, 28.80% from 25 to 44, 23.90% from 45 to 64, and 13.30% who were 65 years of age or older. The median age was 37 years. For every 100 females, there were 95.70 males. For every 100 females age 18 and over, there were 93.50 males.

The median income for a household in the county was $31,628, and the median income for a family was $38,004. Males had a median income of $30,526 versus $21,040 for females. The per capita income for the county was $15,704. About 13.90% of families and 17.60% of the population were below the poverty line, including 24.70% of those under age 18 and 18.20% of those age 65 or over.

== Government ==
United States presidential election results for Talladega County, Alabama
Year	Republican		Democratic		Third party(ies)	
Year	No.	%	No.	%	No.	%
1904	252	16.10%	1,264	80.77%	49	3.13%
1908	351	25.23%	1,010	72.61%	30	2.16%
1912	111	6.13%	1,312	72.49%	387	21.38%
1916	447	22.39%	1,539	77.10%	10	0.50%
1920	931	30.14%	2,137	69.18%	21	0.68%
1924	628	26.04%	1,730	71.72%	54	2.24%
1928	1,602	48.43%	1,693	51.18%	13	0.39%
1932	617	15.51%	3,354	84.31%	7	0.18%
1936	489	11.14%	3,751	85.42%	151	3.44%
1940	534	11.84%	3,965	87.88%	13	0.29%
1944	675	17.74%	3,102	81.50%	29	0.76%
1948	593	16.01%	0	0.00%	3,112	83.99%
1952	3,588	41.52%	5,028	58.18%	26	0.30%
1956	4,197	43.73%	5,243	54.63%	157	1.64%
1960	4,723	44.86%	5,729	54.41%	77	0.73%
1964	8,946	70.67%	0	0.00%	3,712	29.33%
1968	1,935	10.32%	3,099	16.52%	13,722	73.16%
1972	12,763	73.12%	4,567	26.16%	125	0.72%
1976	6,425	36.49%	10,577	60.07%	606	3.44%
1980	9,902	47.97%	10,159	49.22%	580	2.81%
1984	14,067	61.11%	8,490	36.88%	463	2.01%
1988	12,973	60.32%	8,291	38.55%	242	1.13%
1992	12,661	48.21%	10,695	40.72%	2,908	11.07%
1996	10,931	47.99%	10,385	45.59%	1,462	6.42%
2000	13,807	54.25%	11,264	44.26%	380	1.49%
2004	18,331	61.31%	11,374	38.04%	193	0.65%
2008	20,112	58.80%	13,779	40.28%	313	0.92%
2012	19,246	57.60%	13,905	41.61%	265	0.79%
2016	20,614	61.71%	12,121	36.28%	672	2.01%
2020	22,235	62.35%	13,138	36.84%	290	0.81%
2024	22,100	66.47%	10,898	32.78%	252	0.76%

United States Senate election results for Talladega County, Alabama2
Year	Republican		Democratic		Third party(ies)	
Year	No.	%	No.	%	No.	%
2020	21,726	60.99%	13,855	38.89%	44	0.12%

United States Senate election results for Talladega County, Alabama3
Year	Republican		Democratic		Third party(ies)	
Year	No.	%	No.	%	No.	%
2022	14,269	66.00%	6,891	31.87%	460	2.13%

Alabama Gubernatorial election results for Talladega County
Year	Republican		Democratic		Third party(ies)	
Year	No.	%	No.	%	No.	%
2022	14,313	66.13%	6,684	30.88%	647	2.99%

The county is a Republican stronghold. However, Doug Jones, in his 2017 bid for the Senate managed to flip the county Democratic, due to sexual misconduct allegations against his opponent, Roy Moore. Donald Trump nevertheless won the county by wide margins against Hillary Clinton and Joe Biden in the 2016 and 2020 presidential elections respectively.

== Education ==
Talladega County Schools is the local school district.

The Birmingham Supplementary School Inc. (BSS, バーミングハム日本語補習校 Bāminguhamu Nihongo Hoshūkō), a part-time Japanese school, has its office at the Honda Manufacturing of Alabama, LLC facility in unincorporated Talladega County, near Lincoln. It holds its classes at the Shelby-Hoover campus of Jefferson State Community College in Hoover. The school first opened on September 1, 2001.

== Transportation ==
=== Major highways ===
- Interstate 20
- U.S. Highway 78 / State Route 4 (unsigned)
- U.S. Highway 231 / State Route 53 (unsigned)
- U.S. Highway 280 / State Route 38 (unsigned)
- State Route 21
- State Route 34
- State Route 76
- State Route 77
- State Route 148
- State Route 202
- State Route 235
- State Route 275

=== Rail ===
- CSX Transportation
- Norfolk Southern Railway
- Amtrak
- Eastern Alabama Railway

== Communities ==
=== Cities ===
- Childersburg
- Lincoln
- Oxford (part of Oxford is in Calhoun County)
- Sylacauga
- Talladega (county seat)

=== Towns ===
- Bon Air
- Munford
- Oak Grove
- Talladega Springs
- Vincent (part of Vincent is in Shelby County and in St. Clair County)
- Waldo

=== Census-designated places ===
- Fayetteville
- Mignon

=== Unincorporated communities ===
- Alpine
- Bemiston (neighborhood in Talladega)
- Chinnabee
- Curry
- Eastaboga (part of Eastaboga is in Calhoun County)
- Fishtrap
- Hopeful
- Kahatchie
- Kentuck
- Laniers
- Liberty Hill
- Mardisville
- McElderry Station
- Old Eastaboga
- Renfroe
- Sycamore
- Winterboro

=== Ghost town ===
- Gantts Quarry

== See also ==
- National Register of Historic Places listings in Talladega County, Alabama
- Properties on the Alabama Register of Landmarks and Heritage in Talladega County, Alabama
