= Alabama's 3rd congressional district =

U.S. House district for Alabama

Coordinates: 32°57′45.31″N 85°36′59.24″W

- Interactive map of district boundaries since January 3, 2025 (Note: The district has the same boundary as chosen by the District Court for the Northern District of Alabama in 2023 for the 2024 elections as a result of Allen v. Milligan, and as drawn by the Alabama Legislature in 2026 as a result of Louisiana v. Callais. As such, boundaries of the district will not change at the 2026 elections.)
- Representative: Mike Rogers; R–Weaver
- Area: 7,988 mi^{2} (20,690 km^{2})
- Distribution: 50.24% urban; 49.76% rural
- Population (2025): 743,354
- Median household income: $62,311
- Ethnicity: 70.0% White; 20.3% Black; 3.8% Hispanic; 3.6% Two or more races; 1.7% Asian; 0.6% other
- Occupation: 51.7% White-collar; 33.1% Blue-collar; 15.2% Gray-collar
- Cook PVI: R+23

Alabama's 3rd congressional district is a United States congressional district in Alabama that elects a representative to the United States House of Representatives. It is based in east-central Alabama and encompasses all of Calhoun, Chambers, Cherokee, Clay, Cleburne, Etowah, Lee, Randolph, St. Clair, and most of Talladega county. Cities in the district include Auburn, Phenix City, Gadsden, and Talladega. Prior to the most recent redistricting cycle, the 3rd district had included parts of the state capital city of Montgomery in Montgomery County.

At the federal level, the district is strongly Republican-leaning, though not quite as strongly as some of the other districts in the state. Donald Trump carried the district in 2024 with 73% of the vote while Kamala Harris won 26% of the vote.

The district is currently represented by Republican Mike Rogers and was once represented by Bob Riley, the former Governor of Alabama.

== Recent election results from statewide races ==
The following chart shows the results of recent federal and statewide races in the 3rd district.

Year	Office	Winner	D %	R %
2012	President	Mitt Romney (R)	36.7%	62.2%
2016	President	Donald Trump (R)	32.0%	64.7%
2016	Senate	Richard Shelby (R)	33.7%	66.2%
2017	Senate (special)	Roy Moore (R)	47.6%	50.9%
2018	Governor	Kay Ivey (R)	36.5%	63.3%
2018	Lieutenant Governor	Will Ainsworth (R)	35.8%	64.2%
2018	Attorney General	Steve Marshall (R)	37.5%	62.4%
2020	President	Donald Trump (R)	33.5%	65.3%
2020	Senate	Tommy Tuberville (R)	36.3%	63.6%
Redistricted for the 2022 cycle
2022	Senate	Katie Britt (R)	26.2%	71.4%
2022	Governor	Kay Ivey (R)	24.8%	71.7%
2022	Attorney General	Steve Marshall (R)	27.1%	72.8%
2022	Secretary of State	Wes Allen (R)	26.3%	70.9%
Redistricted for the 2024 cycle
2024	President	Donald Trump (R)	26.2%	72.7%

== Counties and communities within the district ==
For the 119th and successive Congresses (based on the districts drawn following the Supreme Court's decision in Allen v. Milligan), the district contains all or portions of the following counties and communities.

Calhoun County (15)

All 15 communities

Chambers County (11)

All 11 communities

Cherokee County (7)

All seven communities

Clay County (5)

All five communities

Cleburne County (5)

All five communities

Etowah County (23)

All 23 communities

Lee County (7)

All seven communities

Randolph County (7)

All seven communities

St. Clair County (13)

All 13 communities

Talladega County (12)

Bon Air, Childersburg, Fayetteville (part; also 6th), Lincoln, Mignon, Munford, Oak Grove, Oxford (shared with Calhoun and Cleburne counties), Sylacauga (part; also 6th), Talladega, Vincent (part; also 6th; shared with St. Clair and Shelby counties), Waldo

Tallapoosa County (11)

All 11 communities

== List of members representing the district ==
Member	Party	Years	Cong ress	Electoral history	Location
District created March 4, 1823
George Washington Owen (Claiborne)	Democratic-Republican	March 4, 1823 – March 3, 1825	18th 19th 20th	Elected in 1823. Re-elected in 1825. Re-elected in 1827. Retired.	1823–1825 "Southern district": Autauga, Baldwin, Butler, Clark, Conecuh, Covington, Dallas, Henry, Mobile, Montgomery, Monroe, Pike, Washington, and Wilcox counties
George Washington Owen (Claiborne)	Jacksonian	March 4, 1825 – March 3, 1829	18th 19th 20th	Elected in 1823. Re-elected in 1825. Re-elected in 1827. Retired.	1825–1833 "Southern district": Autauga, Baldwin, Blount, Butler, Clarke, Conecuh, Covington, Dale, Dallas, Henry, Mobile, Montgomery, Monroe, Pike, Washington, and Wilcox counties
Dixon Hall Lewis (Montgomery)	Jacksonian	March 4, 1829 – March 3, 1833	21st 22nd	Elected in 1829. Re-elected in 1831. Redistricted to the 4th district.	1825–1833 "Southern district": Autauga, Baldwin, Blount, Butler, Clarke, Conecuh, Covington, Dale, Dallas, Henry, Mobile, Montgomery, Monroe, Pike, Washington, and Wilcox counties
Samuel Wright Mardis (Montevallo)	Jacksonian	March 4, 1833 – March 3, 1835	23rd	Redistricted from the 2nd district and re-elected in 1833. Retired.	1833–1841 [data missing]
Joab Lawler (Mardisville)	Whig	March 4, 1835 – May 8, 1838	24th 25th	Elected in 1835. Re-elected in 1837. Died.	1833–1841 [data missing]
Vacant		May 8, 1838 – September 4, 1838	25th		1833–1841 [data missing]
George Whitfield Crabb (Tuscaloosa)	Whig	September 4, 1838 – March 3, 1841	25th 26th	Elected to finish Lawler's term. Re-elected in 1839. Redistricted to the at-large district and lost re-election.	1833–1841 [data missing]
District inactive		March 3, 1841 – March 4, 1843	27th	All representatives elected at-large.	
Dixon Hall Lewis (Lowndesboro)	Democratic	March 4, 1843 – April 22, 1844	28th	Redistricted from the at-large district and re-elected in 1843. Resigned when appointed U.S. senator.	1843–1853 [data missing]
Vacant		April 22, 1844 – December 2, 1844	28th		1843–1853 [data missing]
William Lowndes Yancey (Wetumpka)	Democratic	December 2, 1844 – September 1, 1846	28th 29th	Elected to finish Lewis's term. Re-elected in 1845. Resigned.	1843–1853 [data missing]
Vacant		September 1, 1846 – December 7, 1846	29th		1843–1853 [data missing]
James La Fayette Cottrell (Hayneville)	Democratic	December 7, 1846 – March 3, 1847	29th	Elected to finish Yancey's term. Retired.	1843–1853 [data missing]
Sampson Willis Harris (Wetumpka)	Democratic	March 4, 1847 – March 3, 1855	30th 31st 32nd 33rd	Elected in 1847. Re-elected in 1849. Re-elected in 1851. Re-elected in 1853. Redistricted to the 7th district.	1843–1853 [data missing]
Sampson Willis Harris (Wetumpka)	Democratic	March 4, 1847 – March 3, 1855	30th 31st 32nd 33rd	Elected in 1847. Re-elected in 1849. Re-elected in 1851. Re-elected in 1853. Redistricted to the 7th district.	1853–1861 [data missing]
James Ferguson Dowdell (Chambers)	Democratic	March 4, 1855 – March 3, 1859	34th 35th	Redistricted from the 7th district and re-elected in 1855. Re-elected in 1857. Retired.	1853–1861 [data missing]
David Clopton (Tuskegee)	Democratic	March 4, 1859 – January 21, 1861	36th	Elected in 1859. Withdrew due to Civil War.	1853–1861 [data missing]
Vacant		January 21, 1861 – July 21, 1868	36th 37th 38th 39th 40th	Civil War and Reconstruction	
Benjamin White Norris (Elmore)	Republican	July 21, 1868 – March 3, 1869	40th	Elected for partial term in 1868. Lost re-election.	1868–1873 [data missing]
Robert Stell Heflin (Opelika)	Republican	March 4, 1869 – March 3, 1871	41st	Elected in 1868. Retired.	1868–1873 [data missing]
William Anderson Handley (Roanoke)	Democratic	March 4, 1871 – March 3, 1873	42nd	Elected in 1870. Retired.	1868–1873 [data missing]
Charles Pelham (Talladega)	Republican	March 4, 1873 – March 3, 1875	43rd	Elected in 1872. Retired.	1873–1883 [data missing]
Taul Bradford (Talladega)	Democratic	March 4, 1875 – March 3, 1877	44th	Elected in 1874. Retired.	1873–1883 [data missing]
Jeremiah Norman Williams (Clayton)	Democratic	March 4, 1877 – March 3, 1879	45th	Redistricted from the 2nd district and re-elected in 1876. Retired.	1873–1883 [data missing]
William J. Samford (Opelika)	Democratic	March 4, 1879 – March 3, 1881	46th	Elected in 1878. Retired.	1873–1883 [data missing]
William C. Oates (Abbeville)	Democratic	March 4, 1881 – November 5, 1894	47th 48th 49th 50th 51st 52nd 53rd	Elected in 1880. Re-elected in 1882. Re-elected in 1884. Re-elected in 1886. Re-elected in 1888. Re-elected in 1890. Re-elected in 1892. Retired to run for governor and resigned when elected.	1873–1883 [data missing]
William C. Oates (Abbeville)	Democratic	March 4, 1881 – November 5, 1894	47th 48th 49th 50th 51st 52nd 53rd	Elected in 1880. Re-elected in 1882. Re-elected in 1884. Re-elected in 1886. Re-elected in 1888. Re-elected in 1890. Re-elected in 1892. Retired to run for governor and resigned when elected.	1883–1893 [data missing]
George Paul Harrison Jr. (Opelika)	Democratic	November 6, 1894 – March 3, 1897	53rd 54th	Elected to finish Oates's term. Also elected to the next full term. Retired.	1883–1893 [data missing]
George Paul Harrison Jr. (Opelika)	Democratic	November 6, 1894 – March 3, 1897	53rd 54th	Elected to finish Oates's term. Also elected to the next full term. Retired.	1893–1903 [data missing]
Henry De Lamar Clayton Jr. (Eufaula)	Democratic	March 4, 1897 – May 25, 1914	55th 56th 57th 58th 59th 60th 61st 62nd 63rd	Elected in 1896. Re-elected in 1898. Re-elected in 1900. Re-elected in 1902. Re-elected in 1904. Re-elected in 1906. Re-elected in 1908. Re-elected in 1910. Re-elected in 1912. Resigned to become U.S. Judge for the Middle and Northern District of Alabama.	1893–1903 [data missing]
Henry De Lamar Clayton Jr. (Eufaula)	Democratic	March 4, 1897 – May 25, 1914	55th 56th 57th 58th 59th 60th 61st 62nd 63rd	Elected in 1896. Re-elected in 1898. Re-elected in 1900. Re-elected in 1902. Re-elected in 1904. Re-elected in 1906. Re-elected in 1908. Re-elected in 1910. Re-elected in 1912. Resigned to become U.S. Judge for the Middle and Northern District of Alabama.	1913–1933 [data missing]
Vacant		May 25, 1914 – June 29, 1914	63rd		1913–1933 [data missing]
William Oscar Mulkey (Geneva)	Democratic	June 29, 1914 – March 3, 1915	63rd	Elected to finish Clayton's term. Retired.	1913–1933 [data missing]
Henry B. Steagall (Ozark)	Democratic	March 4, 1915 – November 22, 1943	64th 65th 66th 67th 68th 69th 70th 71st 72nd 73rd 74th 75th 76th 77th	Elected in 1914. Re-elected in 1916. Re-elected in 1918. Re-elected in 1920. Re-elected in 1922. Re-elected in 1924. Re-elected in 1926. Re-elected in 1928. Re-elected in 1930. Re-elected in 1932. Re-elected in 1934. Re-elected in 1936. Re-elected in 1938. Re-elected in 1940. Re-elected in 1942. Died.	1913–1933 [data missing]
Henry B. Steagall (Ozark)	Democratic	March 4, 1915 – November 22, 1943	64th 65th 66th 67th 68th 69th 70th 71st 72nd 73rd 74th 75th 76th 77th	Elected in 1914. Re-elected in 1916. Re-elected in 1918. Re-elected in 1920. Re-elected in 1922. Re-elected in 1924. Re-elected in 1926. Re-elected in 1928. Re-elected in 1930. Re-elected in 1932. Re-elected in 1934. Re-elected in 1936. Re-elected in 1938. Re-elected in 1940. Re-elected in 1942. Died.	1943–1953 [data missing]
Vacant		November 22, 1943 – March 14, 1944	78th		1943–1953 [data missing]
George W. Andrews (Union Springs)	Democratic	March 14, 1944 – January 3, 1963	78th 79th 80th 81st 82nd 83rd 84th 85th 86th 87th	Elected to finish Steagall's term. Re-elected in 1944. Re-elected in 1946. Re-elected in 1948. Re-elected in 1950. Re-elected in 1952. Re-elected in 1954. Re-elected in 1956. Re-elected in 1958. Re-elected in 1960. Redistricted to the at-large district.	1943–1953 [data missing]
George W. Andrews (Union Springs)	Democratic	March 14, 1944 – January 3, 1963	78th 79th 80th 81st 82nd 83rd 84th 85th 86th 87th	Elected to finish Steagall's term. Re-elected in 1944. Re-elected in 1946. Re-elected in 1948. Re-elected in 1950. Re-elected in 1952. Re-elected in 1954. Re-elected in 1956. Re-elected in 1958. Re-elected in 1960. Redistricted to the at-large district.	1953–1963 [data missing]
District inactive		January 3, 1963 – January 3, 1965	88th	All representatives elected at-large.	
George W. Andrews (Union Springs)	Democratic	January 3, 1965 – December 25, 1971	89th 90th 91st 92nd	Redistricted from the at-large district and re-elected in 1964. Re-elected in 1966. Re-elected in 1968. Re-elected in 1970. Died.	1965–1973 [data missing]
Vacant		December 25, 1971 – April 4, 1972	92nd		1965–1973 [data missing]
Elizabeth B. Andrews (Union Springs)	Democratic	April 4, 1972 – January 3, 1973	92nd	Elected to finish her husband's term. Retired.	1965–1973 [data missing]
Bill Nichols (Sylacauga)	Democratic	January 3, 1973 – December 13, 1988	93rd 94th 95th 96th 97th 98th 99th 100th	Redistricted from the 4th district and re-elected in 1972. Re-elected in 1974. Re-elected in 1976. Re-elected in 1978. Re-elected in 1980. Re-elected in 1982. Re-elected in 1984. Re-elected in 1986. Re-elected in 1988 but died before next term began.	1973–1983 [data missing]
Bill Nichols (Sylacauga)	Democratic	January 3, 1973 – December 13, 1988	93rd 94th 95th 96th 97th 98th 99th 100th	Redistricted from the 4th district and re-elected in 1972. Re-elected in 1974. Re-elected in 1976. Re-elected in 1978. Re-elected in 1980. Re-elected in 1982. Re-elected in 1984. Re-elected in 1986. Re-elected in 1988 but died before next term began.	1983–1993 [data missing]
Vacant		December 13, 1988 – April 4, 1989	100th 101st		1983–1993 [data missing]
Glen Browder (Jacksonville)	Democratic	April 4, 1989 – January 3, 1997	101st 102nd 103rd 104th	Elected to finish Nichols's term. Re-elected in 1990. Re-elected in 1992. Re-elected in 1994. Retired to run for U.S. Senator.	1983–1993 [data missing]
Glen Browder (Jacksonville)	Democratic	April 4, 1989 – January 3, 1997	101st 102nd 103rd 104th	Elected to finish Nichols's term. Re-elected in 1990. Re-elected in 1992. Re-elected in 1994. Retired to run for U.S. Senator.	1993–2003 [data missing]
Bob Riley (Ashland)	Republican	January 3, 1997 – January 3, 2003	105th 106th 107th	Elected in 1996. Re-elected in 1998. Re-elected in 2000. Retired to run for Governor of Alabama.	1993–2003 [data missing]
Mike Rogers (Weaver)	Republican	January 3, 2003 – present	108th 109th 110th 111th 112th 113th 114th 115th 116th 117th 118th 119th	Elected in 2002. Re-elected in 2004. Re-elected in 2006. Re-elected in 2008. Re-elected in 2010. Re-elected in 2012. Re-elected in 2014. Re-elected in 2016. Re-elected in 2018. Re-elected in 2020. Re-elected in 2022. Re-elected in 2024. Re-elected in 2026.	2003–2013
Mike Rogers (Weaver)	Republican	January 3, 2003 – present	108th 109th 110th 111th 112th 113th 114th 115th 116th 117th 118th 119th	Elected in 2002. Re-elected in 2004. Re-elected in 2006. Re-elected in 2008. Re-elected in 2010. Re-elected in 2012. Re-elected in 2014. Re-elected in 2016. Re-elected in 2018. Re-elected in 2020. Re-elected in 2022. Re-elected in 2024. Re-elected in 2026.	2013–2023
Mike Rogers (Weaver)	Republican	January 3, 2003 – present	108th 109th 110th 111th 112th 113th 114th 115th 116th 117th 118th 119th	Elected in 2002. Re-elected in 2004. Re-elected in 2006. Re-elected in 2008. Re-elected in 2010. Re-elected in 2012. Re-elected in 2014. Re-elected in 2016. Re-elected in 2018. Re-elected in 2020. Re-elected in 2022. Re-elected in 2024. Re-elected in 2026.	2023–2025
Mike Rogers (Weaver)	Republican	January 3, 2003 – present	108th 109th 110th 111th 112th 113th 114th 115th 116th 117th 118th 119th	Elected in 2002. Re-elected in 2004. Re-elected in 2006. Re-elected in 2008. Re-elected in 2010. Re-elected in 2012. Re-elected in 2014. Re-elected in 2016. Re-elected in 2018. Re-elected in 2020. Re-elected in 2022. Re-elected in 2024. Re-elected in 2026.	2025–present

== Recent election results ==
These are the results from the twelve eleven election cycles in Alabama's 3rd district.

=== 2002 ===
2002 Alabama's 3rd congressional district election
Party	Candidate	Votes	%
Republican	Mike Rogers	91,169	50.31
Democratic	Joe Turnham	87,351	48.20
Libertarian	George Crispin	2,565	1.42
Write-in		138	0.08
Total votes		181,223	100.00
Republican hold			

=== 2004 ===
2004 Alabama's 3rd congressional district election
Party	Candidate	Votes	%
Republican	Mike Rogers (incumbent)	150,411	61.20
Democratic	Bill Fuller	95,240	38.75
Write-in		133	0.05
Total votes		245,784	100.00
Republican hold			

=== 2006 ===
2006 Alabama's 3rd congressional district election
Party	Candidate	Votes	%
Republican	Mike Rogers (incumbent)	98,257	59.44
Democratic	Greg Pierce	63,559	38.45
Independent	Mark Edwin Layfield	3,414	2.07
Write-in		71	0.04
Total votes		165,301	100.00
Republican hold			

=== 2008 ===
2008 Alabama's 3rd congressional district election
Party	Candidate	Votes	%
Republican	Mike Rogers (incumbent)	150,819	53.39
Democratic	Joshua Segall	131,299	46.48
Write-in		367	0.13
Total votes		282,485	100.00
Republican hold			

=== 2010 ===
2010 Alabama's 3rd congressional district election
Party	Candidate	Votes	%
Republican	Mike Rogers (incumbent)	117,736	59.42
Democratic	Steve Segrest	80,204	40.48
Write-in		199	0.01
Total votes		198,139	100.00
Republican hold			

=== 2012 ===
2012 Alabama's 3rd congressional district election
Party	Candidate	Votes	%
Republican	Mike Rogers (incumbent)	175,306	64.00
Democratic	John Andrew Harris	98,141	35.83
Write-in		483	0.18
Total votes		273,930	100.00
Republican hold			

=== 2014 ===
2014 Alabama's 3rd congressional district election
Party	Candidate	Votes	%
Republican	Mike Rogers (incumbent)	103,558	66.12
Democratic	Jesse Smith	52,816	33.72
Write-in		246	0.16
Total votes		156,620	100.00
Republican hold			

=== 2016 ===
2016 Alabama's 3rd congressional district election
Party	Candidate	Votes	%
Republican	Mike Rogers (incumbent)	192,164	66.93
Democratic	Jesse Smith	94,549	32.93
Write-in		391	0.14
Total votes		287,104	100.00
Republican hold			

=== 2018 ===
2018 Alabama's 3rd congressional district election
Party	Candidate	Votes	%
Republican	Mike Rogers (incumbent)	147,770	63.72
Democratic	Mallory Hagan	83,996	36.22
Write-in		149	0.06
Total votes		231,915	100.00
Republican hold			

=== 2020 ===
2020 Alabama's 3rd congressional district election
Party	Candidate	Votes	%
Republican	Mike Rogers (incumbent)	217,384	67.46
Democratic	Adia McClellan Winfrey	104,595	32.46
Write-in		255	0.08
Total votes		322,234	100.00
Republican hold			

=== 2022 ===
2022 Alabama's 3rd congressional district election
Party	Candidate	Votes	%
Republican	Mike Rogers (incumbent)	135,602	71.25
Democratic	Lin Veasey	47,859	25.15
Independent	Douglas Bell	3,831	2.01
Libertarian	Thomas Casson	3,034	1.59
Total votes		190,326	100.00
Republican hold			

=== 2024 ===
2024 Alabama's 3rd congressional district election
Party	Candidate	Votes	%
Republican	Mike Rogers (incumbent)	243,848	97.93
Write-in		5,160	2.07
Total votes		249,008	100.00
Republican hold			

== See also ==
- Alabama's congressional districts
- List of United States congressional districts
