= Senator Quarles =

Senator Quarles may refer to:

- Joseph V. Quarles (1843–1911), U.S. Senator from Wisconsin
- Tunstall Quarles (1770s–1855), Kentucky State Senate
- William Andrew Quarles (1825–1893), Tennessee State Senate
