= William Anderson Handley =

American politician and merchant (1834–1909)

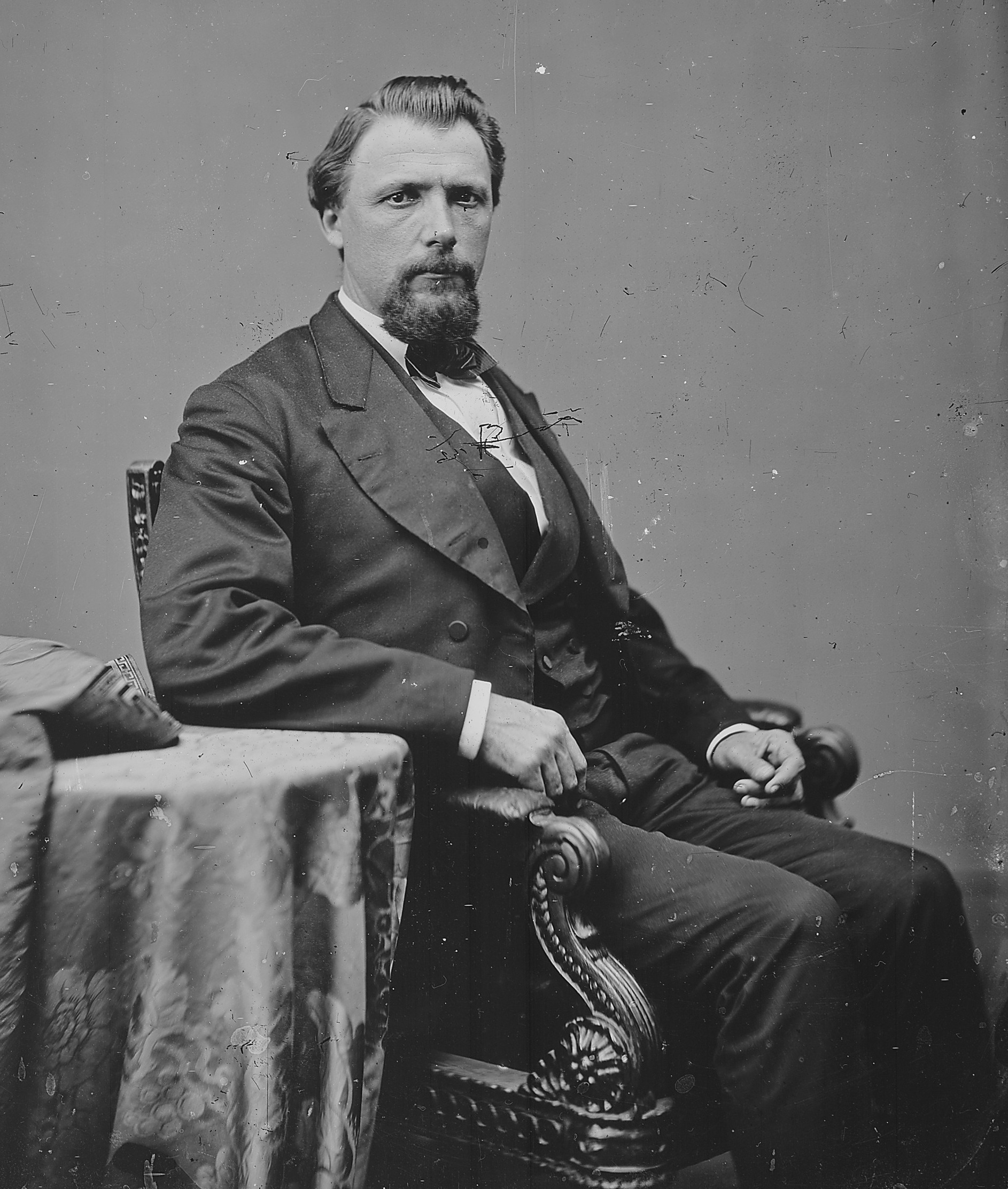
- Portrait of Handley by Mathew Brady, c. 1860 – c. 1865

Member of the U.S. House of Representatives from Alabama's 3rd district
- In office March 4, 1871 – March 3, 1873
- Preceded by: Robert S. Heflin
- Succeeded by: Charles Pelham

Member of the Alabama Senate from the Chambers and Randolph County district
- In office 1888–1892

Member of the Alabama House of Representatives
- In office 1903–1907

Personal details
- Born: December 15, 1834 Franklin, Georgia, US
- Died: June 23, 1909 (aged 74) Roanoke, Alabama, US
- Party: Democratic
- Occupation: Politician, merchant

Military service
- Allegiance: Confederate States of America
- Branch/service: Confederate States Army
- Rank: Captain
- Unit: 25th Alabama Infantry Regiment
- Battles/wars: American Civil War

William Anderson Handley (December 15, 1834 – June 23, 1909) was an American politician and merchant. A Democrat, he was a member of the United States House of Representatives from Alabama.

Born in Franklin, Georgia, Handley later moved to Alabama. During the American Civil War, he was a captain of the Confederate States Army. He then worked as a merchant, returning to the industry after his political career. He was a member of the House from 1871 to 1873. From 1888 to 1892, he was a member of the Alabama Senate, and from 1903 to 1907, was a member of the Alabama House of Representatives.

== Early life and military service ==
Handley was born on December 15, 1834, at "Liberty Hill", in Franklin, Georgia, one of five children born to John Randolph Handley and Nancy Thompson (née Formby) Handley. He and his family later moved to Roanoke, Alabama, where he was educated at local public schools. He worked as a store clerk in Louina.

During the American Civil War, Handley was captain of Company F of the 25th Alabama Infantry Regiment. He was primarily stationed in Mobile, though later served under Braxton Bragg. Under Bragg, he fought in the Confederate Heartland Offensive and the Battle of Stones River, being wounded in the latter. In 1863, he resigned from the military, working as a Confederate States tax collector for the remainder of the war.

== Mercantile career and politics ==
After the war, Handley lost his wealth due. He worked as a farmer for two years, having to sell his property to absolve himself of debts. He then established a mercantile business with a $1,000 loan. Before the war, he owned slaves.

Handley was a Democrat. He was a member of the United States House of Representatives, from March 4, 1871, to March 3, 1873, representing Alabama's 3rd district. After winning the election, his opponent, Republican Benjamin White Norris, accused he and other Democrats of electoral fraud, with Handley returning similar accusations. He was declared the winner. During his tenure, he was a member of the Committees on Elections; on Financial Services; and on Ways and Means. He voted in favor of the Reconstruction Amendments and against a school integration amendment to the Civil Rights Act of 1866.

Handley was a delegate to the 1876 Democratic National Convention. From 1888 to 1902, he was a member of the Alabama Senate, representing Chambers and Randolph Counties. He was a delegate to the 1901 Alabama State Constitutional convention. From 1903 to 1907, he was a member of the Alabama House of Representatives. Ideologically, he was liberal.

Following his political career, Handley repurchased his mercantile business, establishing the firm Moore, Manley, & Handley, reportedly the most successful business in Randolph County. In February 1882, he established Moore, Moore, and Handley, a Birmingham expansion of the firm. Also in 1882, he cofounded the Moore and Handley Hardware Company. In the early 1900s, he established the W. A. Handley Manufacturing, a cotton mill. He also owned a bank and a line of the Atlanta, Birmingham and Atlantic Railway.

== Personal life and death ==
On November 8, 1859, Handley married Adelia A. Mitchell. They had five children together, with two surviving to adulthood. He donated money for the construction of numerous schools. In spring 1909, he suffered a fall, dying from his injuries on June 23, 1909, aged 74, in Roanoke. He was buried on June 24, at the Roanoke City Cemetery.

U.S. House of Representatives
Preceded by Robert S. Heflin	Member of the U.S. House of Representatives from Alabama's 3rd congressional district March 4, 1871 – March 3, 1873	Succeeded by Charles Pelham
