= Bradley Bozeman =

American football player (born 1994)

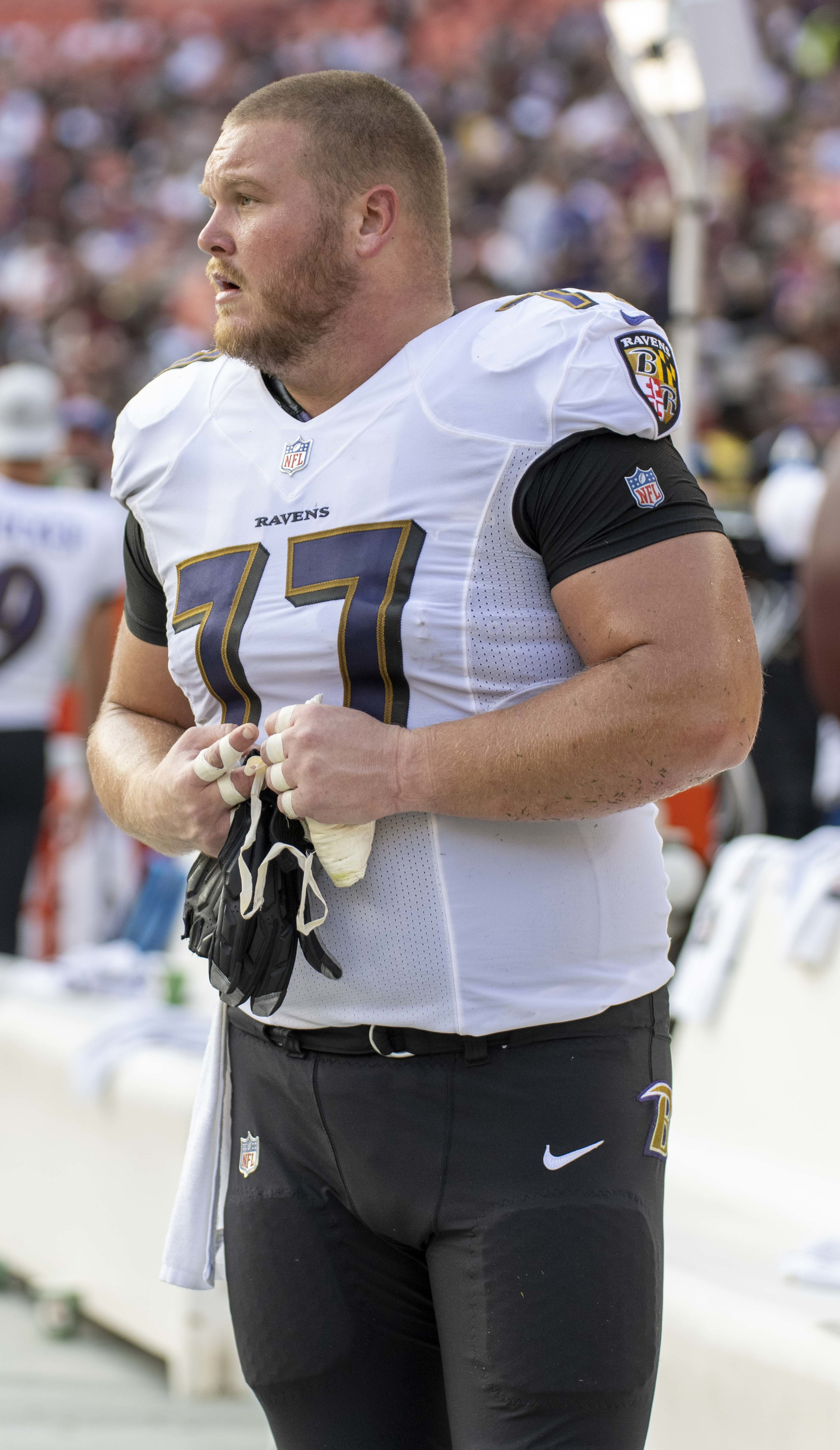
- Bozeman with the Baltimore Ravens in 2021

No. 77, 56, 75
- Position: Center

Personal information
- Born: November 24, 1994 (age 31); Roanoke, Alabama, U.S.
- Listed height: 6 ft 5 in (1.96 m)
- Listed weight: 325 lb (147 kg)

Career information
- High school: Handley (Roanoke)
- College: Alabama (2013–2017)
- NFL draft: 2018: 6th round, 215th overall pick

Career history
- Baltimore Ravens (2018–2021); Carolina Panthers (2022–2023); Los Angeles Chargers (2024–2025)

Awards and highlights
- Second-team All-SEC (2017); 2× CFP national champion (2015, 2017)

Career NFL statistics
- Games played: 129
- Games started: 110
- Stats at Pro Football Reference

Bradley Bozeman (born November 24, 1994) is an American former professional football player who was a center for eight seasons in the National Football League (NFL). He played college football for the Alabama Crimson Tide and was selected by the Baltimore Ravens in the sixth round of the 2018 NFL draft, he also played for the Carolina Panthers and Los Angeles Chargers.

== College career ==
A native of Roanoke, Alabama, Bozeman was a 4-star offensive line recruit. He committed to play college football at Alabama in 2013 over offers from Auburn, Clemson, and Tennessee.

Bozeman redshirted as a true freshman in 2013. The following year, as a redshirt freshman, Bozeman played in nine games, starting two (against Arkansas and Texas A&M). In 2015, Bozeman played in all 15 games as a reserve guard and center.

Bozeman earned a starting spot at center in 2016, serving as the successor for Indianapolis Colts first-round draft pick Ryan Kelly. He started all 15 games in an offense that had 11 100-yard rushing games. Bozeman was voted team captain by his teammates for the 2017 season. In his senior year, as a starting center, he helped Alabama win the 2018 College Football Playoff National Championship. He was named Second Team All-SEC for his redshirt senior season.

== Professional career ==
Pre-draft measurables
| Height | Weight | Arm length | Hand span | Wingspan | 40-yard dash | 10-yard split | 20-yard split | 20-yard shuttle | Three-cone drill | Vertical jump | Broad jump | Bench press |
|---|---|---|---|---|---|---|---|---|---|---|---|---|
| 6 ft 4 5/8 in (1.95 m) | 317 lb (144 kg) | 31 1/4 in (0.79 m) | 9 3/4 in (0.25 m) | 6 ft 4 5/8 in (1.95 m) | 5.47 s | 1.92 s | 3.15 s | 5.17 s | 8.25 s | 24.0 in (0.61 m) | 8 ft 1 in (2.46 m) | 27 reps |
All values from Pro Day

=== Baltimore Ravens ===
Bozeman was selected by the Baltimore Ravens in the sixth round (215th overall) of the 2018 NFL draft. He played in 14 games as a rookie, starting one game, against the New Orleans Saints, at left guard. In his second season, Bozeman was named starting left guard, and started every game of the 2019 and 2020 seasons. In 2021, he made the shift to being the starting center.

=== Carolina Panthers ===
On March 18, 2022, Bozeman signed a one-year contract with the Carolina Panthers.

On March 13, 2023, Bozeman signed a three-year, $18 million contract extension with the Panthers.

On March 13, 2024, Bozeman was released by the Panthers.

=== Los Angeles Chargers ===
On March 18, 2024, Bozeman signed with the Los Angeles Chargers. He was named the starting center, and started all 17 games.

On March 10, 2025, Bozeman signed a two-year, $6.5 million contract extension with the Chargers.

On February 23, 2026, Bozeman announced his retirement from the NFL.

== Personal life ==
Bozeman proposed to Alabama basketball player Nikki Hegstetter in 2018, after the College Football Playoff championship game against Georgia. They married on March 23, 2019.

During the 2019 NFL season, Bozeman and his wife Nikki lived full-time in an RV they had bought for offseason travel, but soon decided to live full-time in it. In a 2020 ESPN story, Bozeman estimated that the move saved them about $1,800 per month in rent. After the season, they traveled the U.S. in a smaller donated RV, combining anti-bullying presentations to student groups with sightseeing side trips until their venture was cut short due to COVID-19 pandemic. The couple initially planned to live in their larger RV for at least two more years, but found a house they felt they could not pass up, and planned to move into it upon their return from their cross-country trip.

In 2018, Bozeman and Nikki founded the Bradley & Nikki Bozeman Foundation, which focuses on at-risk children and their families to educate them on the dangers of childhood bullying. In 2020, the foundation held a number of food drives in partnership with Mount Pleasant Church and Ministries.
