= Charles Pelham (American politician) =

American politician (1835–1908)

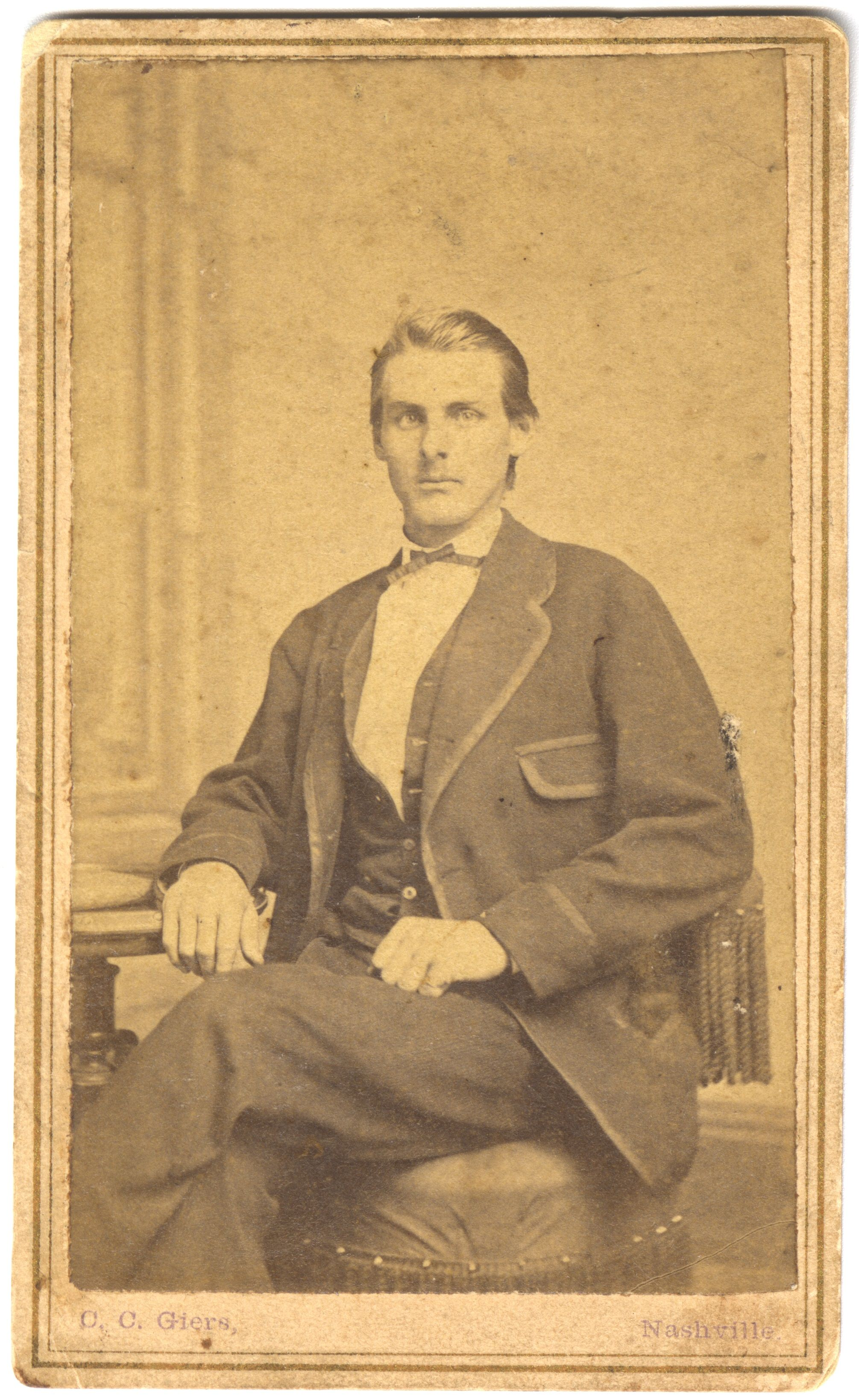

Member of the U.S. House of Representatives from Alabama's 3rd district
- In office March 4, 1873 – March 3, 1875
- Preceded by: William A. Handley
- Succeeded by: Taul Bradford

Personal details
- Born: March 12, 1835 Person County, North Carolina, U.S.
- Died: January 18, 1908 (aged 72) Poulan, Georgia, U.S.
- Resting place: Presbyterian Cemetery
- Party: Republican

Military service
- Allegiance: Confederate States
- Branch/service: Confederate States Army
- Rank: First lieutenant
- Unit: Fifty-first Regiment, Alabama Infantry
- Battles/wars: American Civil War

Charles Pelham (March 12, 1835 – January 18, 1908) was an American lawyer, politician, and Confederate Civil War veteran who served one term as a U.S. congressional representative from Alabama from 1873 to 1875.

== Early life ==
Pelham was born in Person County, North Carolina. Pelham moved with his parents to Alabama in 1838, where his brother John Pelham was born. There, Charles Pelham attended the common schools and later studied law.

== Career ==
=== Legal career ===
In 1858, he was admitted to the bar and commenced practice in Talladega, Alabama.

=== Civil War ===
After the beginning of the U.S. Civil War, Pelham entered the Confederate army in 1862 and served as first lieutenant of Company C, Fifty-first Regiment, Alabama Infantry.

=== Judge ===
After the war, he served as judge of the tenth judicial circuit of Alabama from 1868 until 1873.

=== Congress ===
Pelham was elected as a Republican to the Forty-third Congress (March 4, 1873 – March 3, 1875).

=== Later career ===
When he was not renominated in 1874, Pelham resumed the practice of law in Washington, D.C. Late in life, he was appointed a clerk in the Treasury Department.

== Death ==
In 1907, he moved to Poulan, Georgia, where he died the following year on January 18, 1908. He was interred in the Presbyterian Cemetery.

== See also ==
- Samuel Taylor Suit, who married Pelham's daughter Rosa

U.S. House of Representatives
Preceded by William A. Handley	Member of the U.S. House of Representatives from Alabama's 3rd congressional district March 4, 1873 – March 3, 1875	Succeeded by Taul Bradford
