= Thomas Montgomery (American politician) =

American politician

Thomas Montgomery (1779 – April 2, 1828) was a U.S. representative from Kentucky.

Born in what is now Nelson County, Virginia, Montgomery received a thorough English training. He studied law. He was admitted to the bar and commenced practice in Stanford, Kentucky. He served as judge of the circuit court of Lincoln County. He served as member of the State house of representatives in 1811.

Montgomery was elected as a Democratic-Republican to the Thirteenth Congress (March 4, 1813 – March 3, 1815). He was an unsuccessful candidate for reelection to the Fourteenth Congress.

Montgomery was again elected to the Sixteenth Congress to fill the vacancy caused by the resignation of Tunstall Quarles. He was reelected to the Seventeenth Congress and served from August 1, 1820, to March 3, 1823. He served as chairman of the Committee on Public Expenditures (Seventeenth Congress). He died in Stanford, Kentucky, April 2, 1828.

U.S. House of Representatives
Preceded by District created	United States Representative, Kentucky's 11th district March 4, 1813–March 3, 1815	Succeeded by Micah Taul
Preceded by Tunstall Quarles	United States Representative, Kentucky's 11th district August 1, 1820–March 3, 1823	Succeeded by Charles A. Wickliffe
