= Micah Taul =

American politician (1785–1850)

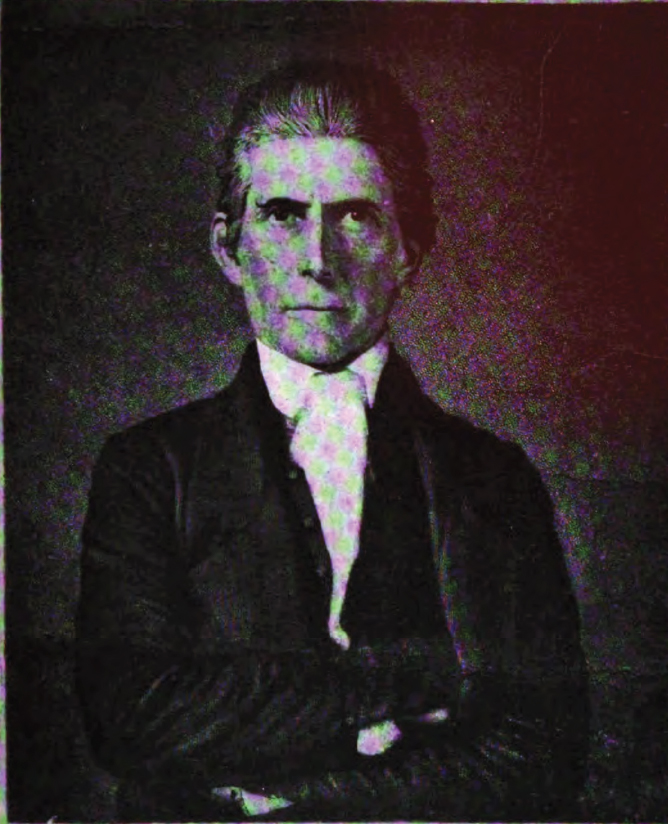

Member of the U.S. House of Representatives from Kentucky's 9th district
- In office March 4, 1815 – March 3, 1817
- Preceded by: Thomas Montgomery
- Succeeded by: Tunstal Quarles

Personal details
- Born: May 14, 1785 Bladensburg, Maryland
- Died: May 27, 1850 (aged 65) Mardisville, Alabama
- Party: Democratic-Republican
- Relations: Taul Bradford (grandson)
- Profession: Lawyer

Military service
- Allegiance: United States of America
- Rank: Colonel
- Unit: Wayne County Volunteers
- Battles/wars: War of 1812

Micah Taul (May 14, 1785 – May 27, 1850) was an American pioneer, planter, lawyer, and politician. He served one term in the United States House of Representatives for Kentucky. In 1826 he moved to Winchester, Tennessee, where he practiced law for twenty years. Then he moved with his family to Mardisville, Alabama, where he operated a cotton plantation for several years before his death. He was the grandfather of politician Taul Bradford.

== Early life and education ==
Micah Taul was born on May 14, 1785, in Bladensburg, Maryland. Taul moved as a child to Kentucky with his parents in 1787, soon after the United States had gained independence. He attended private school, as no public schools were yet established. He studied law, probably "reading" with an established firm, and serving as a legal apprentice. He was admitted to the bar in 1801 and commenced practice in Monticello, Kentucky, the county seat of Wayne County. That year he also served as Clerk of Wayne County Courts.

He married and had a family.

== Career ==
During the War of 1812, he raised and outfitted troops, serving as a colonel of Wayne County Volunteers.

In 1814 Taul was elected as a Democratic-Republican to the Fourteenth Congress, serving one term (March 4, 1815 – March 3, 1817). He declined to be a candidate for renomination in 1816.

Taul resumed his law practice. He moved in 1826 with his family to Winchester, Tennessee, on the southern border of the state, and continued the practice of law.

In 1846 he moved to Mardisville, Alabama, an area that had many cotton plantations, and had once been home to the Creek people. He operated a plantation and used enslaved labor to do so, until his death there on May 27, 1850. He was interred on his plantation at Mardisville.

He was the grandfather of Taul Bradford, who represented Alabama in Congress and served the Confederacy in the American Civil War.

U.S. House of Representatives
Preceded by Thomas Montgomery	Member of the U.S. House of Representatives from Kentucky's 9th congressional district 1815 – 1817	Succeeded by Tunstall Quarles
