= James T. Rapier =

American politician (1837–1883)

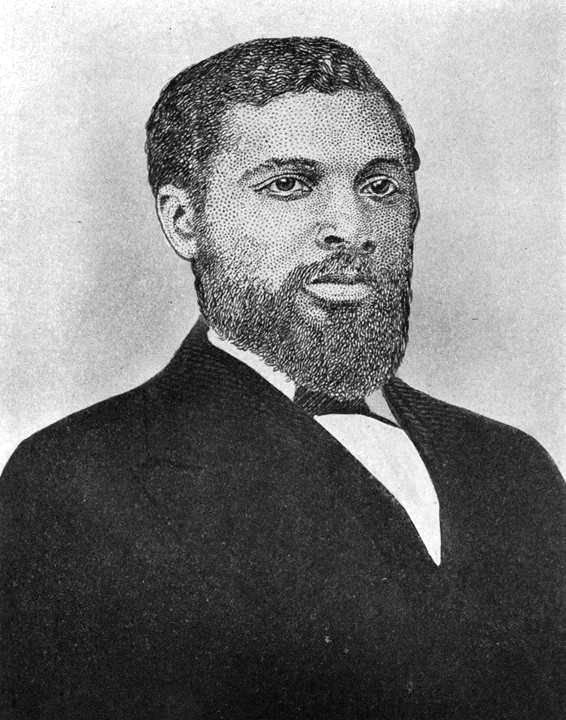
- Rapier c. 1870s

Member of the U.S. House of Representatives from Alabama's 2nd district
- In office March 4, 1873 – March 3, 1875
- Preceded by: Charles Waldron Buckley
- Succeeded by: Jeremiah Norman Williams

Personal details
- Born: James Thomas Rapier; November 13, 1837 Florence, Alabama, U.S.
- Died: May 31, 1883 (aged 45) Montgomery, Alabama, U.S.
- Party: Republican

James Thomas Rapier (November 13, 1837 – May 31, 1883) was an American lawyer and politician from Alabama during the Reconstruction Era. He served as a United States representative from Alabama, for one term from 1873 until 1875. Born free in Alabama, he went to school in Canada and earned a law degree in Scotland before being admitted to the bar in Tennessee.

Rapier was a nationally prominent figure in the Republican Party, one of seven black men serving in the 43rd Congress. He worked in 1874 for passage of the Civil Rights Act of 1875, which guaranteed equal access to public accommodations until the U.S. Supreme Court ruled it unconstitutional in 1883. It was the last federal civil rights law enacted until the passage of the Civil Rights Act of 1957. Parts of the law were re-adopted in the Civil Rights Act of 1964 and Civil Rights Act of 1968.

== Early life ==
Rapier was born free in 1837 in Florence, Alabama, to John H. Rapier, a prosperous local barber, and his wife. They were established free people of color. He had three older brothers. His father had been emancipated in 1829; his mother was born into a free black family of Baltimore, Maryland. She died in 1841 when Rapier was four years old.

In 1842 James and his brother John Jr. went to Nashville, Tennessee, to live with their paternal grandmother Sally Thomas. There they attended a school for African-American children, and learned to read and write.

In 1856 Rapier traveled to Canada with his uncle Henry Thomas, his father's half-brother, who settled in Buxton, Ontario, an all-black community made up chiefly of African Americans. It was developed with the aid of Rev. William King, a Scots-American Presbyterian missionary. King had bought land (with Canadian government approval) for resettlement of black American refugees who had escaped to Canada during the slavery years via the Underground Railroad. The African Americans were building a thriving community, and Rapier's uncle had property there. Rapier attended the Buxton Mission School, which was highly respected and had a classical education.

He earned a teaching degree in 1856 at a normal school in Toronto. He then traveled to Scotland to study at the University of Glasgow. Returning to Canada, he completed his law degree at Montreal College and was admitted to the bar.

== Return to U.S. and career ==
After teaching for a time at the Buxton Mission School. In 1864 Rapier moved in 1864 to Nashville, Tennessee.

Working as a reporter for a northern newspaper, Rapier bought 200 acres in Maury County, Tennessee, and became a cotton planter. He made a keynote speech at the Tennessee Negro Suffrage Convention. He continued as an advocate for black voting rights and was disappointed in the return of Confederates to state office.

With his father needing help, Rapier returned to his home in Alabama in 1866. There he bought 550 acres and again cultivated cotton. He became active in the Republican Party, serving as a delegate to the 1867 state constitutional convention.

In 1870, Rapier ran for Alabama Secretary of State and lost. In 1872, he was elected to the Forty-third United States Congress from Alabama's 2nd congressional district, one of three African-American congressmen elected from the state during Reconstruction. While in Congress, he had national scope. Rapier proposed authorizing a land bureau to allocate Western lands to freedmen. He also proposed that Congress appropriate $5 million for public education in Southern schools.

He was one of seven black congressmen at the time; in 1874, they each testified for the Civil Rights Act, which was signed in 1875. Rapier recalled being denied service at every inn at stopping points between Montgomery, Alabama, and Washington, D.C., despite being a US Congressman. He noted how the race issue in the United States society related to what were often class and religious inequalities in other lands, and said that he was "half slave and half free", having political rights but no civil rights. He said that in Europe, "they have princes, dukes, and lords; in India, "brahmans or priests, who rank above the sudras or laborers;" in America, "our distinction is color."

After losing his re-election campaign in 1874, Rapier was appointed by the Republican presidential administration as a collector for the Internal Revenue Service in Alabama, serving in this role until his death. He campaigned against the conservative Democratic Party's Redeemer government in Alabama, but Democrats regained control of the state legislature in 1874. After passing other restrictive laws that created Jim Crow rules, in 1901 white Democrats passed a new state constitution that required poll taxes and literacy tests for persons trying to register to vote. Under subjective white administration, these barriers essentially disenfranchised most blacks and many poor whites in Alabama, excluding them from the political system for decades into the late 20th century.

Rapier died in Montgomery, Alabama, on May 31, 1883, of pulmonary tuberculosis. He was buried in Calvary Cemetery in St. Louis, Missouri. The Rapier Family Papers are held by Howard University.

=== Misrepresentation by Dunning School ===
In 1979, historian John Hope Franklin gave a presidential address to the American Historical Association. He discussed how Walter L. Fleming of Vanderbilt University, one of the most prominent of the influential historians of the 20th-century Dunning School, had written about Rapier. Franklin observed that Fleming's viewpoint, which had been hostile to civil and voting rights for African Americans, may have led him to make errors.

Franklin said:

Writing in 1905 Walter L. Fleming referred to James T. Rapier, a Negro member of the Alabama constitutional convention of 1867, as "Rapier of Canada." He then quoted Rapier as saying that the manner in which "colored gentlemen and ladies were treated in America was beyond his comprehension." [Fleming, Civil War and Reconstruction in Alabama] In a footnote to his address, Franklin added: "Fleming knew better, for in another place—deep in a footnote (p. 519)—he asserted that Rapier was from Lauderdale, "educated in Canada"."

Franklin explained:

Born in Alabama in 1837, Rapier, like many of his white contemporaries, went North for an education. The difference was that instead of stopping in the northern part of the United States, as, for example, (the pro-slavery advocate) William L. Yancey did, Rapier went on to Canada. Rapier's contemporaries did not regard him as a Canadian; and, if some were not precisely clear about where he was born (as was the Alabama State Journal, which referred to his birthplace as Montgomery rather than Florence), they did not misplace him altogether. [Loren Schweninger, James T. Rapier and Reconstruction (Chicago, 1978), xvii, 15.]

Franklin said: "In 1905 Fleming made Rapier a Canadian because it suited his purposes to have a bold, aggressive, 'impertinent' Negro in Alabama Reconstruction come from some non-Southern, contaminating environment like Canada. But it did not suit his purposes to call Yancey, who was a graduate of Williams College, a 'Massachusetts Man.' Fleming described Yancey (a white Confederate) as, simply, the 'leader of the States Rights men.'" [Fleming, Civil War and Reconstruction in Alabama, p. 12.] For a detailed account and comparison of Yancey and other white Southerners who went North to secure an education, see Franklin's book, A Southern Odyssey: Travelers in the Antebellum North (Baton Rouge: Louisiana State University Press, 1976), pp. 45–80.

Franklin is critical of Fleming for falsely stating that Rapier, and others, were "carpetbaggers." Franklin said, "...some of the people that Fleming called carpetbaggers had lived in Alabama for years and were, therefore, entitled to at least as much presumption of assimilation in moving from some other state to Alabama decades before the war as the Irish were in moving from their native land to some community in the United States. ...Whether they had lived in Alabama for decades before the Civil War or had settled there after the war, these "carpetbaggers" were apparently not to be regarded as models for Northern investors or settlers in the early years of the twentieth century. Twentieth-century investors from the North were welcome provided they accepted the established arrangements in race relations and the like. Fleming served his Alabama friends well by ridiculing carpetbaggers, even if in the process he had to distort and misrepresent."

== See also ==
- Civil rights movement (1865–1896)
- List of African-American United States representatives

U.S. House of Representatives
Preceded by Charles Waldron Buckley	Member of the U.S. House of Representatives from Alabama's 2nd congressional district March 4, 1873 – March 3, 1875	Succeeded by Jeremiah Norman Williams
