= Robert Stell Heflin =

American politician (1815–1901)

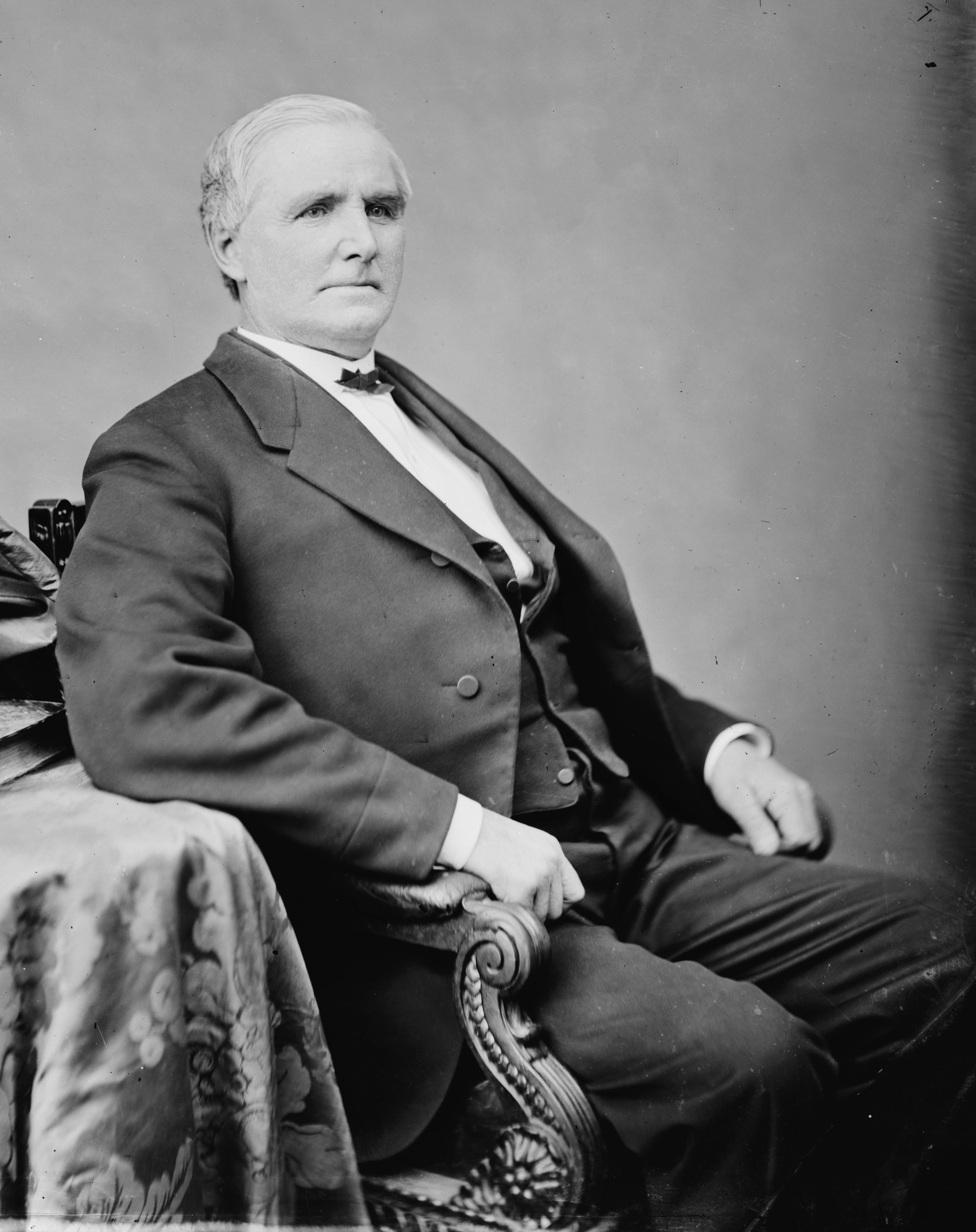

Member of the U.S. House of Representatives from Alabama's 3rd district
- In office March 4, 1869 – March 3, 1871
- Preceded by: Benjamin W. Norris
- Succeeded by: William A. Handley

Georgia State Senate
- In office 1840–1841

Personal details
- Born: Robert Stell Heflin; April 15, 1815 Morgan County, Georgia
- Died: January 24, 1901 (aged 85) Wedowee, Alabama
- Resting place: Masonic Cemetery
- Party: Republican
- Spouses: Elizabeth Phillips Heflin; Mentoria Reeves Heflin
- Relations: James Thomas Heflin (nephew); Howell Heflin (grandnephew)
- Military career
- Allegiance: United States
- Branch: Georgia militia
- Service years: 1836
- Conflicts: Second Creek War; Battle of Shepherd's Plantation

Robert Stell Heflin (April 15, 1815 – January 24, 1901) was an American politician who in the 19th century was a member of the state legislatures in both Georgia and Alabama, and in the United States House of Representatives representing Alabama.

== Early life ==
Robert Stell Heflin was born in Morgan County, Georgia, near the city of Madison. He was educated in Fayetteville, Georgia, where his parents settled in 1832. His father, Wyatt Heflin, was the first elected Sheriff of Fayette County, Georgia.

== Military career ==
Robert Heflin served in the Creek War in the Battle of Shepherd's Plantation. The battle was fought on June 9, 1836, between a force of Georgia militia and an attacking party of Creek warriors. The battle was a pivotal fight in the war of resistance launched by Coweta, Yuchi, Hitchiti, and other tribal warriors, who sought to prevent the forced removal of their people from their traditional lands along the Chattahoochee River. Robert Stell was wounded by a musket ball that broke his femur. From that event on, he always walked with a limp and a cane.

== Early career ==
His first formal job was a legal career as a Clerk of the Superior Court of Fayette County, Georgia, Fall of 1836–1840. He also studied law and was admitted to the bar in 1840. He practiced law in Fayetteville.

== Political career ==
He served in the Georgia State Senate in 1840 and 1841.

As more land was being opened up for white Americans in east Alabama in 1844, Robert Stell and his family followed his father and siblings to Louina on the eastern side of the Tallapoosa River in Randolph County, Alabama. While living in Alabama, he was active in politics, served in the Alabama House of Representatives in 1849, and in the Alabama State Senate in 1860. One of the few Southern Unionists, Robert Stell, was opposed to secession. After resigning from the Alabama Legislature upon the State's secession, he made his home in north Randolph County, Alabama. His brother, Superior Court Judge Thomas Heflin, had become a wealthy and powerful individual in Alabama politics. Once the Civil War began, Robert Stell was viewed as a threat and was arrested and carried to Andersonville, Georgia.

Judge Thomas Heflin used his influence to have his brother Robert Stell released. When Sherman marched through Georgia, a battle was fought at Brown's Mill in Coweta County, Georgia. General Joseph Wheeler routed the Union soldiers, and some made it to the home of Robert Stell Heflin. They confiscated what they needed, and he was given vouchers by the Union soldiers for his remaining cattle and food. After the war, he was repaid for his property by the US government. Following the end of the war, he served as judge of probate for Randolph County by appointment in 1865 and was elected to that office in 1866. Probate Court Judges settled disputes involving property and land that became in contention after the Civil War.

=== U.S. House of Representatives ===
Robert Heflin was elected to the United States Congress as a member of the United States House of Representatives representing the 3rd Congressional District of Alabama and served from March 4, 1869, to March 3, 1871, the first time representatives were allowed to serve from the Confederate States. He was best known for introducing a bill that was passed and signed into law, which provided an annual pension to wounded survivors and widows of militia members who served in the Creek Indian Wars.

Shortly after Robert Stell was elected to Congress, gold was discovered at Dahlonega, Villa Rica, and Carrollton, Georgia; Gold Hill in Cleburne County and Cragford in Clay County, Alabama, were sites of discovery. Robert Stell, along with other gold speculators, invested in the search for gold in east Alabama. This speculation ultimately cost him almost everything that he owned.

== Death ==
Robert Heflin died on January 24, 1901, near Wedowee, Alabama, and his remains were interred in the Masonic Cemetery in Wedowee along with his first wife, Elizabeth Phillips Heflin, and Mentoria Reeves Heflin. Because of his political beliefs, he is not buried with the remainder of the Heflin Family located at Concord Church near Wadley, Alabama.

== Family ==
He was the uncle of Alabama U.S. Senator James Thomas Heflin and granduncle of Alabama U.S. Senator Howell Heflin.

== Notes ==
U.S. House of Representatives
Preceded by Benjamin W. Norris	Member of the U.S. House of Representatives from Alabama's 3rd congressional district 1869–1871	Succeeded by William A. Handley
