= Edward A. Burkhalter =

United States admiral (1928–2020)

Edward Allen Burkhalter, Jr.
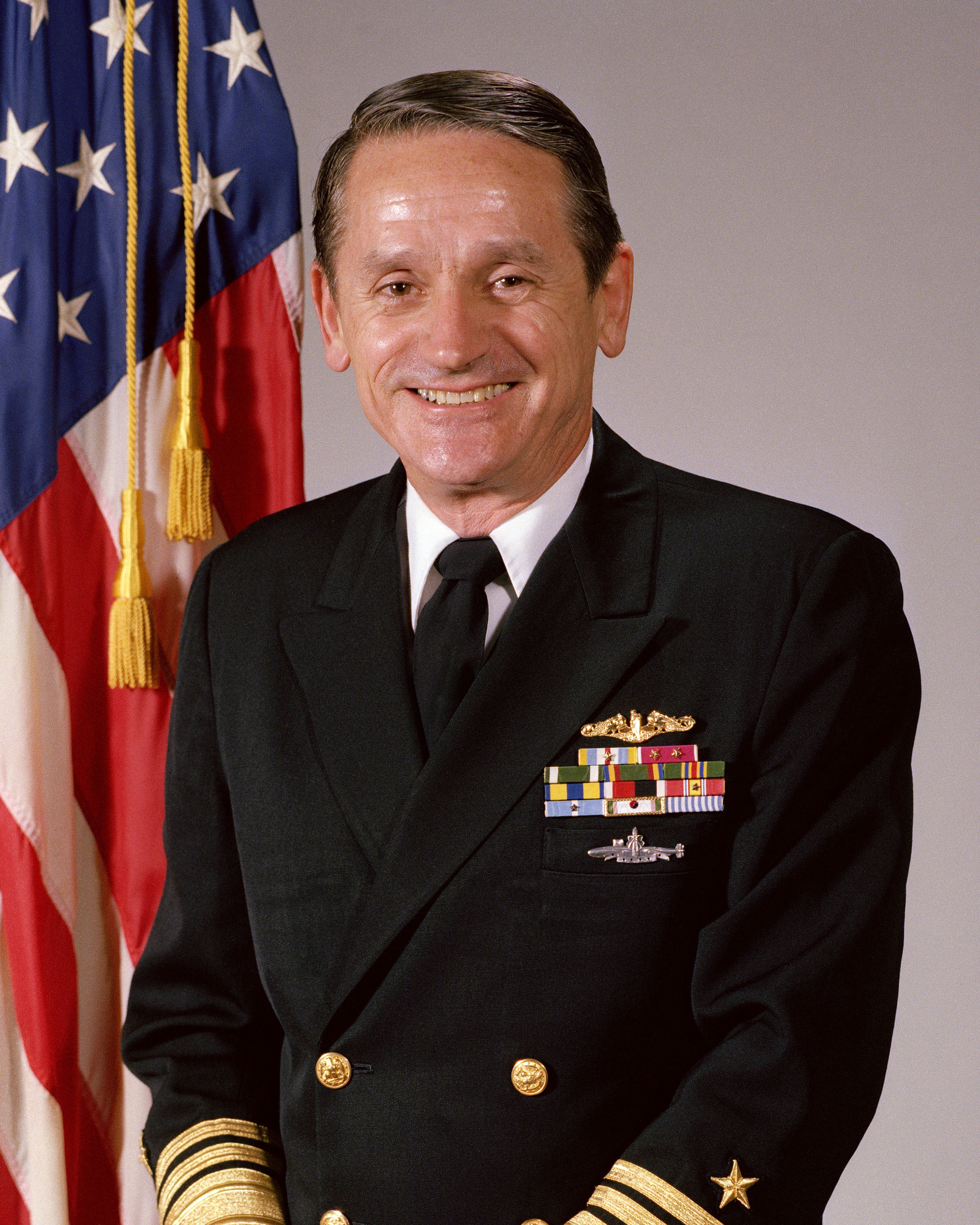
- Edward A. Burkhalter, 1983
- Born: September 15, 1928; Roanoke, Alabama, U.S.
- Died: July 1, 2020 (aged 91); Annapolis, Maryland, U.S.
- Military career
- Allegiance: United States of America
- Branch: United States Navy
- Service years: 1951–1987
- Rank: Vice Admiral
- Nickname: Al
- Commands: Naval Intelligence
- Other work: Burkhalter Associates, Inc., President; SteelCloud, Inc., Chairman of the Board

Vice Admiral Edward Allen Burkhalter, Jr. (September 15, 1928 – July 1, 2020) was a United States Navy admiral and Director of Strategic Operations for the Chairman of the Joint Chiefs of Staff from 1984 to 1987.

== Biography ==
Burkhalter was born in Roanoke, Alabama. He attended the U.S. Naval Academy and graduated in 1951.

Burkhalter's primary Naval career was in submarines, but the last 10 years of his career focused on intelligence. He served as Chief of Naval Intelligence, Defense Intelligence Agency and later as the DIA's Chief of Staff, and Director of the Intelligence Community Staff, Central Intelligence Agency. He also served as Director of Strategic Operations for the Chairman of the Joint Chiefs of Staff.

He was a recipient of the Defense Superior Service Medal with two Gold Stars, the Legion of Merit with two Gold Stars, the Navy and Marine Corps Commendation Medal and was entitled to wear the Submarine Warfare Officer Badge and the SSBN Deterrent Patrol Badge.

Burkhalter was president of Burkhalter Associates, Inc., a consultancy firm. In 1989, he was a member of a four-man of three retired military officers and one retired senior CIA officer. The team reported to the President's National Security Advisor and the new Director National Drug Policy and charged with outlining the strategic concepts needed for the "Drug War". Their report was approved by the President and later became the basis of Plan Colombia and other U.S. counter-drug programs. Burkhalter then served as a director on the board of SteelCloud, Inc. from 1997 to 2007. In July 2006, he became the Chairman of the Board of SteelCloud, Inc.

Burkhalter died on July 1, 2020, at the age of 91, from a heart attack and suspected complications of COVID-19.
