= Wilkie Clark =

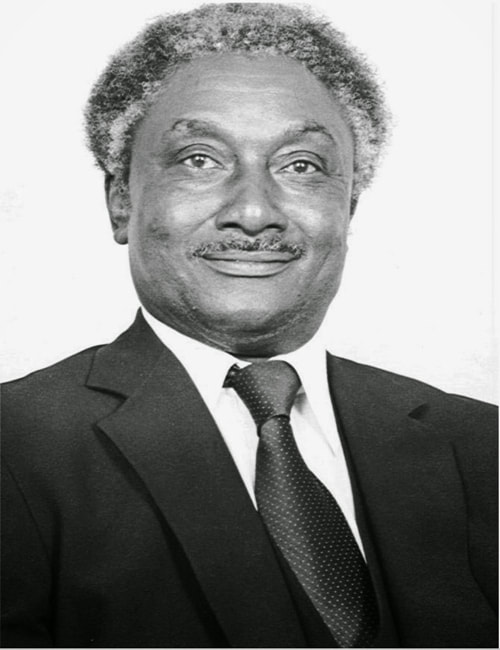
- Wilkie Clark
- Born: March 8, 1920; Carrollton, Carroll County, Georgia, U.S.
- Died: July 29, 1989 (aged 69); Roanoke, Alabama, U.S.
- Occupations: Businessman, civil rights leader
- Known for: Founding President, Randolph County NAACP Branch; founder of Clark Memorial Funeral Service

Wilkie Clark (March 8, 1920 – July 29, 1989) was an early voting rights activist, African American businessman, civil rights leader, community organizer, politician, and founder of Clark Memorial Funeral Service in Roanoke, Alabama. Born into rural poverty under the sharecropping system in the segregated Deep South, Clark later became the founding president of NAACP Branch in Randolph County despite racial and economic barriers.

== Personal life ==
Clark was born in rural Carrollton, Carroll County, Georgia, on March 8, 1920, into a family of sharecroppers during the height of Jim Crow segregation. Clark was not able to get an education beyond 7th grade, instead working to help his mother sharecropping. His education was also hindered by the poor conditions faced by black children of sharecroppers at the time, with local Black schools underfunded, short-term, and often held in church basements or farm outbuildings. These conditions made it very difficult for many Black youth to complete school.

He married Hattie Lee Peters Clark, an educator, who also worked in public service. They had one daughter, Charlotte A. Clark-Frieson. Clark was a member of Bethel United Methodist Church

== Career and business leadership ==
As a young adult, Clark worked as a chauffeur for a prominent white Roanoke doctor, Dr. G.W. Bonner. He also worked as a common laborer for the Atlantic Coast Line Railroad for 18 years, where his exposure to racism and labor exploitation began building the motivations for his later work. In 1969, he founded Clark Funeral Home, Inc. as a family enterprise in Roanoke, Randolph County, Alabama. Over time his funeral home became a "safe place" for black citizens seeking to address their oppressive circumstances during the civil rights movement.

== Civil rights leadership ==
In the 1950s Clark became the founding president of Randolph County's Branch #5053 of the National Association for the Advancement of Colored People (NAACP). Under his leadership, the local branch was officially chartered. As president, Clark was an ex officio board member of the Alabama State Conference of NAACP Branches and actively engaged with the NAACP's Southeast Region. As a local NAACP President, Clark worked with leaders like Ruby Hurley, and Earl Shinhoster, both long-serving Regional Directors of the Atlanta-based, Southeast Regional Conference of the NAACP. He also worked with Dr. W.C. Patton, E.D. Nixon, Alabama State Representative Thomas Reed , and Hazel C. Eubanks, all of whom served as Presidents of the Alabama State Conference of NAACP Branches.

In his work, Clark expanded Black voter registration, challenged segregation in local schools, advocated for the hiring of Black educators and police officers, and defended Black residents’ civil rights. Leading a local NAACP branch in rural Alabama during this period was dangerous and often brought threats or intimidation. Despite this, Clark continued his work for over 30 years, ultimately receiving the NAACP's Distinguished Service Award for his commitment.

== Legacy and honors ==
After Clark's death in 1989, his only child, a daughter, Charlotte A.Clark-Frieson continued his legacy by operating Clark (Memorial) Funeral Service, publishing his biography entitled, "Chief Cook & Bottle-Washer: The Unconquerable Soul of Wilkie Clark", and establishing a Foundation in his honor. A portion of the book's proceeds has supported the Wilkie Clark Memorial Foundation.

In 2024, an official Alabama State Historic Marker was erected at the site of Clark Funeral Home in Roanoke. The marker recognizes Wilkie and Hattie Peters Clark's contributions to civil rights, Black economic independence, and local community development. The front side of the marker reads:

"Clark Funeral Home was established on this site in 1969 by Wilkie Clark and his wife and business partner, Hattie Peters Clark, representing the life-long dream of the well-known civil rights activist and entrepreneur. The funeral home was established in the East Roanoke Black community, which included the Randolph County Training School, churches, and businesses. This location would come to be known as the unofficial home of the Civil Rights Movement in Randolph County. Born in Carrollton, Georgia, in 1920, Clark was a WWII veteran and an award-winning founding president of the Randolph County NAACP, Branch #5053. Hattie P. Clark was a Randolph County public school educator for more than three decades. They recognized the need for Black people to have economic independence during their early struggles for enhanced civil rights in Randolph County. Establishing his own business, with the support of the Black community, freed Wilkie and his wife from the economic dependency that had prevented Black civil rights leaders from combating the region’s system of Jim Crow segregation and economic and political oppression. The Clarks used this business entity as a platform to advance civil rights reform in Roanoke and Randolph County."

A long-time advocate for the education of Black students, Wilkie Clark was the first Black candidate for a seat on the Randolph County Board of Education. He was also instrumental in advocating for the hiring of the first Black police officers in Roanoke and desegregating the city’s recreation facilities. Wilkie and Hattie Lee also petitioned the city of Roanoke to pave streets in the Black community and provide water and sewer services, which were only available in White neighborhoods. The Clarks were especially active during the 1980s as key members of a coalition pushing for enforcement of the 1965 Voting Rights Act. The coalition included education, civic, clerical, and business leaders and supported a lawsuit, in which Clark was a plaintiff, designed to strengthen the Voting Rights Act. The coalition successfully advocated for additional polling sites and the inclusion of Blacks as poll workers and creating new single member voting districts from which Black residents could be elected. Renaissance man Wilkie Clark Wilkie Clark was among the local leaders in the movement for enhanced economic, educational, and political representation for the Black community in Roanoke and Randolph County.

The street on which he resided for nearly 50 years, in rural Roanoke, Alabama now bears his name — "Wilkie Clark Drive" — and his family continues to advocate for the creation of the Wilkie Clark Community Center and Historic Site as a living tribute to his contributions.
