= Jeremiah Norman Williams =

American politician (1829–1915)

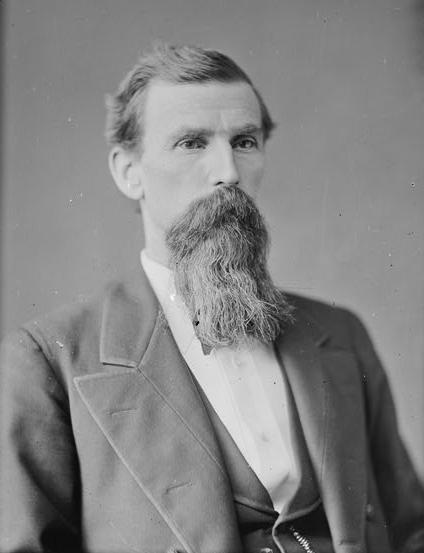

Member of the U.S. House of Representatives from Alabama
- In office March 4, 1875 – March 3, 1879
- Preceded by: James T. Rapier (2nd); Taul Bradford (3rd)
- Succeeded by: Hilary A. Herbert (2nd); William J. Samford (3rd)
- Constituency: 2nd district (1875-77); 3rd district (1877-79)

Personal details
- Born: May 29, 1829 Louisville, Alabama, US
- Died: May 8, 1915 (aged 85) Clayton, Alabama, US
- Party: Democratic
- Spouse: Mary Eliza Screws
- Children: 5
- Education: University of South Carolina

Jeremiah Norman Williams (May 29, 1829 – May 8, 1915) was an American politician. He was a two-term Democratic U.S. Representative from Alabama. His election marked the return of Democratic control of Alabama's 2nd congressional district, after Republican control during the earlier years of Reconstruction.

== Early life ==
Williams was born on May 29, 1829, near Louisville, Alabama, to Judge Stith and Euphemia Williams. After attending the preparatory schools of Barbour County, he graduated from the University of South Carolina at Columbia in 1852.

Williams studied law in Montgomery and Tuskegee and was admitted to the bar in 1855. He commenced practice in Clayton, Alabama.

== American Civil War service ==
When the American Civil War broke out he volunteered for service in the Confederate States Army and was made captain of the Clayton Guards. He then became a major of the First Regiment, Alabama Infantry, before resigning due to illness. During the war he married Mary Eliza Screws. They had five children together.

== Postbellum ==
After the war Williams was elected a member of the Alabama House of Representatives in 1872, but was not allowed to take his seat. In 1874 he was elected as a Democrat to represent Alabama's 2nd congressional district in the 44th United States Congress. After redistricting, he won a second term representing Alabama's 3rd congressional district in the 45th United States Congress. Williams served as chairman of the Committee on Expenditures in the Post Office Department in the Forty-fifth Congress. He served two full terms, from March 4, 1875, to March 3, 1879.

After leaving office he resumed his law practice in Clayton. He served as Chancellor of the third division of the chancery court from 1893 to 1899. In 1901 he served as member of the Alabama Constitutional Convention.

== Death ==
Williams died in Clayton on May 8, 1915, and was interred in the City Cemetery.

U.S. House of Representatives
Preceded by James T. Rapier	Member of the U.S. House of Representatives from Alabama's 2nd congressional district March 4, 1875 – March 3, 1877	Succeeded by Hilary A. Herbert
Preceded by Taul Bradford	Member of the U.S. House of Representatives from Alabama's 3rd congressional district March 4, 1877 – March 3, 1879	Succeeded by William J. Samford
