= George Eddy =

American-French basketball journalist and former player

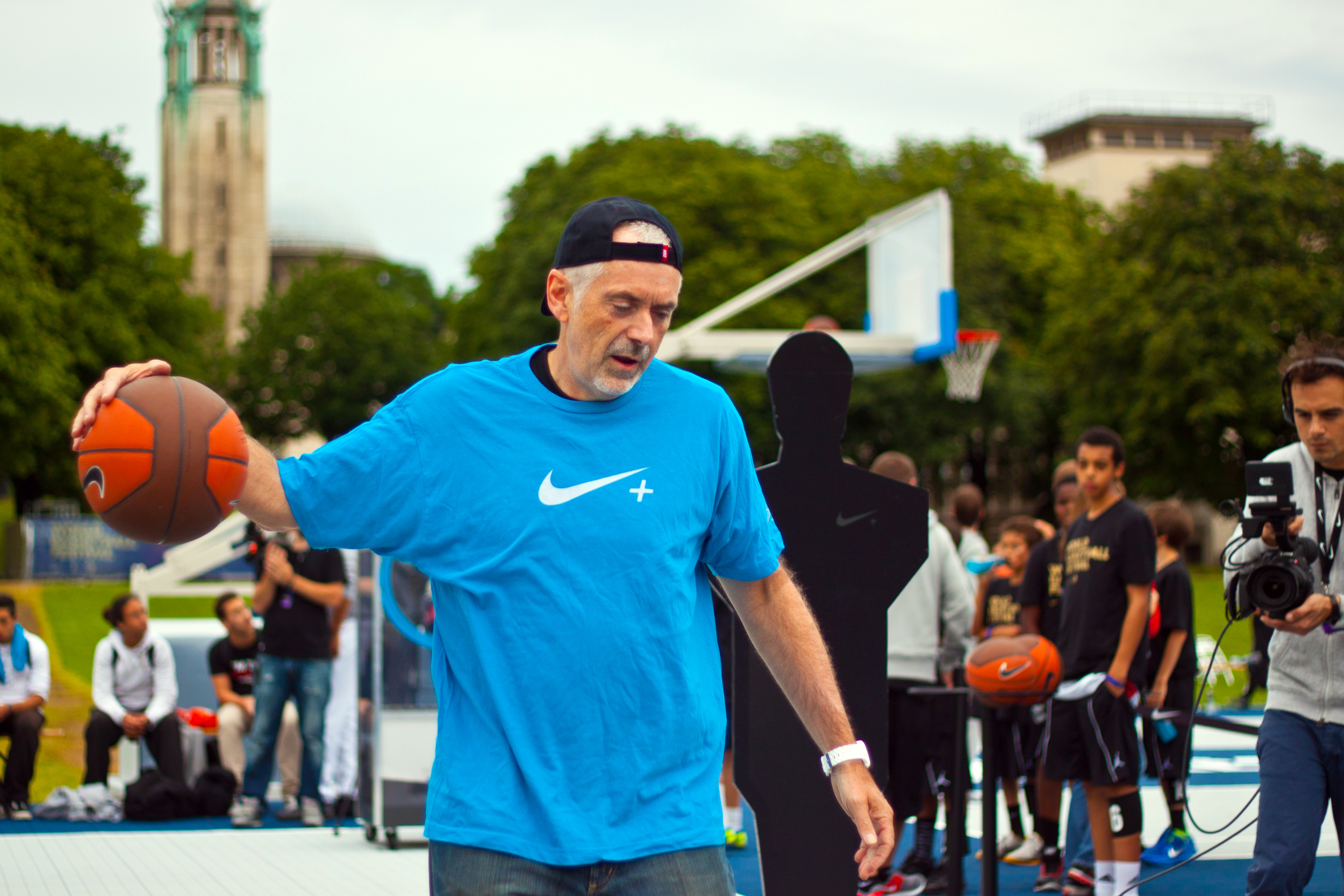
- Eddy in 2012
- Born: 16 June 1956 (age 70); Roanoke, Alabama, U.S.
- Occupation: Pundit
- Employer: Canal +

Georges Sherwood Eddy (born June 16, 1956) is an American-French basketball journalist and former professional basketball player.

== Career ==
Eddy was born in Roanoke, Alabama, and moved to Florida with his family at age three. He is the son of a French mother, Denyse, who was visually handicapped, and an American father, David, who was partially paralyzed and was working as a literature teacher. His parents were supporters of Martin Luther King. David Eddy was a lifetime member of the National Association for the Advancement of Colored People (NAACP), also his mother was a member of the association. George Eddy shook King's hand as a three-year old in Talladega, Alabama. He said, the fight for civil rights for black Americans was always present during his childhood.

Eddy grew up in Winter Park, Florida. He discovered basketball at age six when his neighbor invited him watching a game of the Harlem Globetrotters on television and fell in love with the sport. As a child, he played basketball on playgrounds in and around Winter Park and started playing organized basketball in a local team at age ten. He quickly found out that shooting the ball was his biggest strength. He attended Glenridge Middle School and Winter Park High School, but never made the varsity basketball teams as he was regularly cut shortly before the start of the season. At Winter Park, Eddy was a close friend of Stan Pietkiewicz. As a senior in high school, Eddy served as public address announcer at the school's basketball games.

In 1974, he enrolled at the University of Florida, studying criminal justice. Eddy tried to make the Gators' basketball team as a walk-on, but was never granted a roster spot. According to Eddy, he gained reputation as the best basketball player on campus who did not make the varsity team. He practiced several times a week, but did not consider to transfer to another university to play competitive basketball, because he wanted to stay at the University of Florida.

While visiting France with his mother in the summer of 1977, Eddy was looking for a place to play basketball and was put in contact with first division side Alsace de Bagnolet. After a one-hour tryout, in which only 2-on-2 basketball was played, the club's chairman signed him for a low salary. The fact that Eddy would count as a French player worked for him as well. "To go over to France and suddenly find myself playing professionally was just a dream come true", he told the Orlando Sentinel in 1987. However, Eddy did not see much playing time on the Bagnolet team in the early stages of the 1977–78 campaign and was about to be sent back to the United States. He stayed with the team and saw his playing time increase considerably during the season after the team was hit by injuries, suspension and had released their American player.

From 1978 to 1980, Eddy, a 6’3’’ shooter, played at Châlons-sur-Marne in the third tier of French basketball where he excelled as a scorer and finished second with the team in both seasons. In 1980, he signed with Caen Basket Club of the French top flight, where he played his best basketball. Eddy continued his professional basketball career at first-division side Nice (1982–83), before joining St. Julien-les-Villas (second division) near the city of Troyes for the 1983–84 season. After being among the best French scorers of the league, Eddy went to Paris in 1984, turning out for Racing Club de France in the 1984–85 season. He helped Racing earn promotion to the French top flight, again ranking among the best French scorers of the league. In the 1985–86 season, Eddy saw action in 25 games of the first French division, averaging 3.7 points per contest for Racing.

In November 1984, Eddy sent in his application for a job as basketball commentator at French TV station Canal Plus, who had acquired the rights to cover the NBA, and was handed the job in January 1985. He started commentating NBA games for Canal Plus. "I'm very different from the French announcers because I'm enthusiastic, sort of in the John Madden style. French sports announcers take themselves very seriously. They think of themselves as journalists, not fans, so they sort of have a stone-faced, Dan Rather approach", he told the Orlando Sentinel in 1987. In an article published in the New York Times in April 2017, Eddy was called "perhaps the man most responsible for introducing the country (France) to the NBA". His style of sportscasting was described as exuberant. Speaking French with a strong American accent and mixing French with American basketball terms became his trademark.

Eddy also commentated basketball games of the French league and international competition, such as the Olympic Games. Besides Canal Plus, he worked for other media, including Eurosport. Eddy also covered the Super Bowl on French TV. When Michael Jordan and later Shaquille O'Neal visited France in the 1990s, Eddy served as their translator and tour guide. He commented his last game involving the French men's national team in September 2022 (final of the European championship), but continued his commentary work on Canal Plus Afrique and Canal Plus France.

In July 2023, Eddy had a heart attack while shooting hoops at a playground in Chatou. He was saved by a 21-year-old man who performed first aid. In December 2024, Eddy was decorated with the Legion of Honour.
