= C. W. Buckley =

American politician (1835–1906)

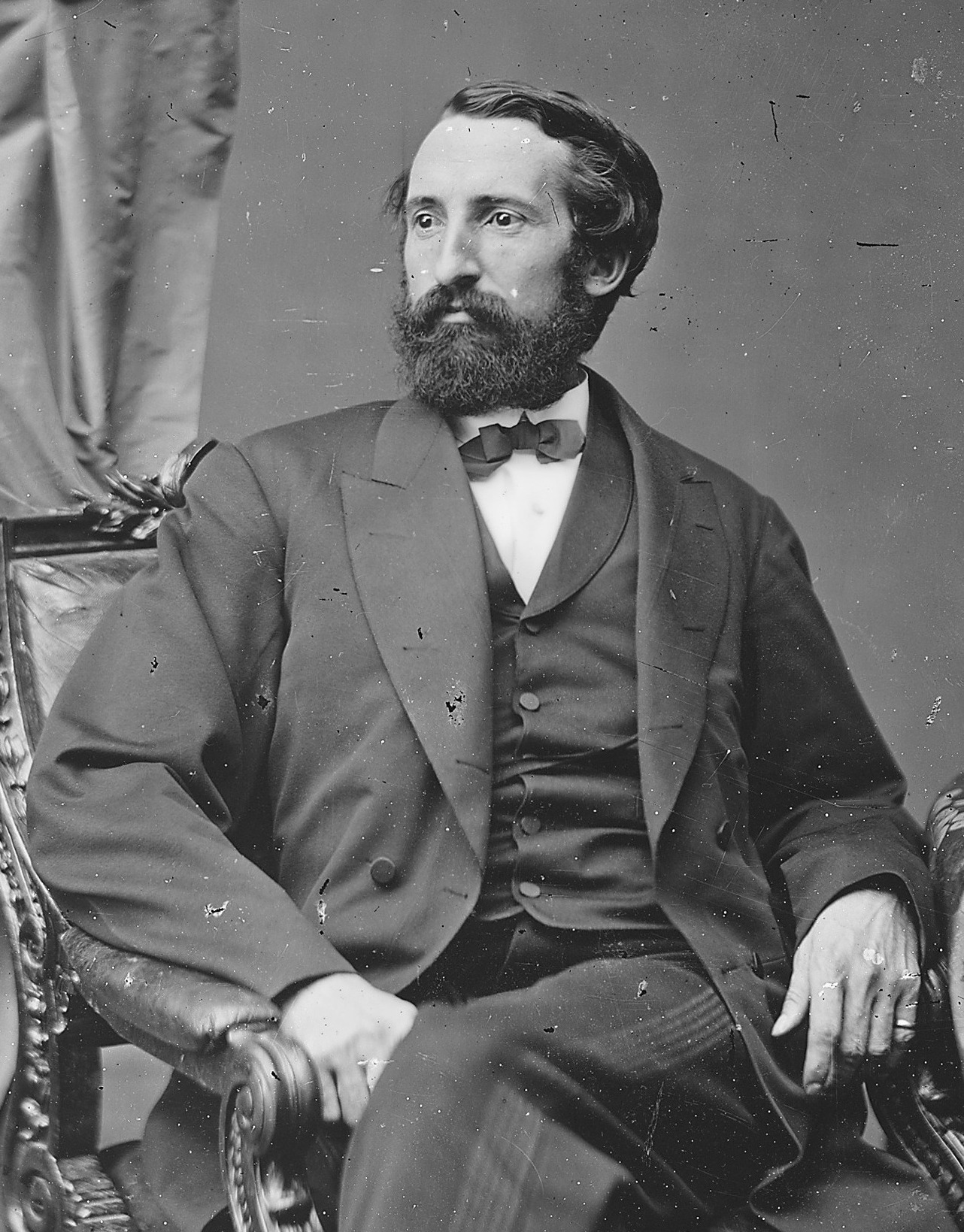

Member of the U.S. House of Representatives from Alabama's 2nd district
- In office July 21, 1868 – March 3, 1873
- Preceded by: James L. Pugh
- Succeeded by: James T. Rapier

Personal details
- Born: Charles Waldron Buckley; February 18, 1835 Unadilla, New York, US
- Died: December 4, 1906 (aged 71) Montgomery, Alabama, US
- Party: Republican

Charles Waldron Buckley (February 18, 1835 – December 4, 1906) was a U.S. representative from Alabama.

Born in Unadilla, New York, Buckley attended the public schools in Unadilla and Freeport, Illinois, where his parents moved in 1846. He was graduated from Beloit College, in Wisconsin, in 1860 and from the Union Theological Seminary in New York City three years later.

During the American Civil War, Buckley entered the Union Army on February 9, 1864. He served as chaplain of the Forty-seventh Regiment, United States Colored Volunteer Infantry and of the Eighth Regiment, Louisiana Colored Infantry, until January 5, 1866, when he was mustered out.

After the war, Buckley became Alabama superintendent of education for the Bureau of Refugees and Freed Men in 1866 and 1867. During this time he resided in Montgomery. Also in 1867, he served as delegate to the Alabama constitutional convention. At the same time, Buckley engaged in agricultural pursuits, banking, the fire insurance business and mining.

Upon the re-admission of the State of Alabama to representation in Congress, Buckley was elected as a Republican to the Fortieth Congress. He was re-elected in the two subsequent elections as well, but stood not as a candidate for renomination in 1872.

After his political career, Buckley served as probate judge of Montgomery County (1874–1878), while resuming banking and the fire insurance business. Moreover, he was postmaster of Montgomery in 1881–1885, 1890–1893 and 1897–1906. In addition, he served as delegate to the Republican National Convention in 1896.

Buckley died in Montgomery, on December 4, 1906.

U.S. House of Representatives
Preceded by James L. Pugh	Member of the U.S. House of Representatives from Alabama's 2nd congressional district July 21, 1868 – March 3, 1873	Succeeded by James T. Rapier
