= Taul Bradford =

American politician (1835–1883)

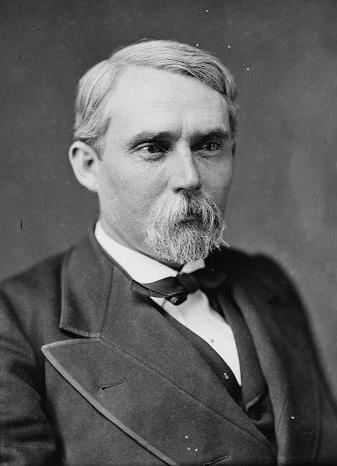
- Taul Bradford

Member of the U.S. House of Representatives from Alabama's 3rd district
- In office March 4, 1875 – March 3, 1877
- Preceded by: Charles Pelham
- Succeeded by: Jeremiah Norman Williams

Member of the Alabama House of Representatives
- In office 1871–1872

Personal details
- Born: January 20, 1835 Talladega, Alabama
- Died: October 28, 1883 (aged 48) Poulan, Georgia
- Resting place: Talladega, Alabama
- Party: Democratic
- Spouse: Mary Hardie Bradford
- Education: University of Alabama at Tuscaloosa
- Profession: Lawyer

Military service
- Allegiance: Confederate States of America
- Branch/service: Confederate States Army
- Years of service: 1861–1865
- Rank: Lieutenant Colonel
- Unit: 10th Alabama Infantry; 30th Alabama Infantry
- Battles/wars: American Civil War

Taul Bradford (January 20, 1835 – October 28, 1883) was an attorney and politician from Talladega, Alabama, who served both in the State House and one term as U.S. Representative following the American Civil War. During the war, he served as an officer in the Confederate States Army, commissioned in his second regiment as a lieutenant colonel.

== Early life ==
Taul Bradford was born in 1835 in Talladega, Alabama, the county seat, to Jacob Tipton Bradford (1807–1866) and Louisiana (née Taul) Bradford (1808-1863). His given name is that of his mother's birth family. His maternal grandfather Micah Taul had moved with his family from Tennessee to Alabama in 1846, where he bought and operated a cotton plantation near Mardisville. Bradford attended the local school for his basic education.

He later graduated from the University of Alabama at Tuscaloosa in 1854, studying law. After being admitted to the bar in 1855, he started a practice in Talladega.

== Military service ==
When the American Civil War broke out, Bradford was commissioned in the Confederate States Army as a major of the Tenth Regiment, Alabama Infantry. He later resigned; his dates with the regiment are not known. It had suffered casualties of more than one-third by the time the regiment furled its colors at Appomattox. He entered the war again, serving as a lieutenant colonel of the Thirtieth Regiment, Alabama Infantry. He resigned this post before the end of the war, although his dates are not known for sure.

== Political career ==
After the war, in the later years of the Reconstruction era, Bradford entered politics. A member of the Democratic Party, he was elected to the State House of Representatives, serving in 1871 and 1872.

Bradford ran for Congress, and was elected in 1874 as a Democrat to the Forty-fourth Congress from Alabama, serving March 4, 1875 – March 3, 1877. He did not stand for renomination in 1876.

== Later life ==
Bradford continued the practice of law in Talladega, until his death on October 28, 1883. He was interred in the town's Oak Hill Cemetery.

== Notes ==
U.S. House of Representatives
Preceded by Charles Pelham	Member of the U.S. House of Representatives from Alabama's 3rd congressional district March 4, 1875 – March 3, 1877	Succeeded by Jeremiah Norman Williams
