= Tunstall Quarles =

American judge and politician

Member of the U.S. House of Representatives from Kentucky's 8th district
- In office March 4, 1817 – June 15, 1820
- Preceded by: Micah Taul
- Succeeded by: Thomas Montgomery

Personal details
- Born: 1770s
- Died: January 7, 1855

Tunstall Quarles (c. 1770 – January 7, 1855) was an American lawyer and politician, as well as one of the pioneer settlers of Somerset, Kentucky in Pulaski County.

Quarles was born in King William County, Virginia. He moved to Kentucky in 1786 with his parents, Tunstall and Susanna Edwards Quarles. He married Pamella Stranger and had ten children.

Quarles came to Somerset sometime before 1812, for in May 1812, he was one of a commission to supervise the building of a County Clerk's office.

Quarles was a lawyer and became a member of the state legislature in 1811 and 1812. In the War of 1812, he armed and equipped a company of the Second Regiment Kentucky Militia at his own expense and then commanded them. After the war, he served as a circuit court judge. He was elected as a Democrat-Republican to be a member of the Fifteenth and Sixteenth Congresses and served from March 1817 until his resignation in June 1820.

Quarles was appointed receiver of public moneys for the Cape Girardeau land district, with offices at Jackson, Missouri, and served from May 1821 to July 1824.

Quarles returned to Somerset in July 1824, where he resumed his law practice and agricultural pursuits.

Like so many other early figures of Pulaski County history, Quarles was an avid member of the Freemasons. Using funding from the National Freemason Association, he was able to organize the first bank in Somerset, the Farmers Bank, and served as president from 1825 to 1827. Little else is known about the role of Quarles in masonic lore.

In 1828, Quarles was again elected to the state House of Representatives, and was elector on the Democratic ticket of Jackson and Calhoun. He served a term in the state Senate in 1840.

U.S. House of Representatives
Preceded by Micah Taul	Member of the U.S. House of Representatives from Kentucky's 8th congressional district 1817 – 1820	Succeeded by Thomas Montgomery
