= Roanoke City Schools =

School district in Alabama, United States

Roanoke City School District is a public school district located in Roanoke, Randolph County, Alabama.

Roanoke City Schools oversees 3 schools, serving a total of 1,427 students in the 2023-24 academic year.

The district is home to the Handley High School Tigers.

== Schools ==
- Knight Enloe Elementary School (PK-3)
- Handley Middle School (4-8)
- Handley High School (9-12)
