= Roanoke, Alabama =

City in Alabama, United States

- City
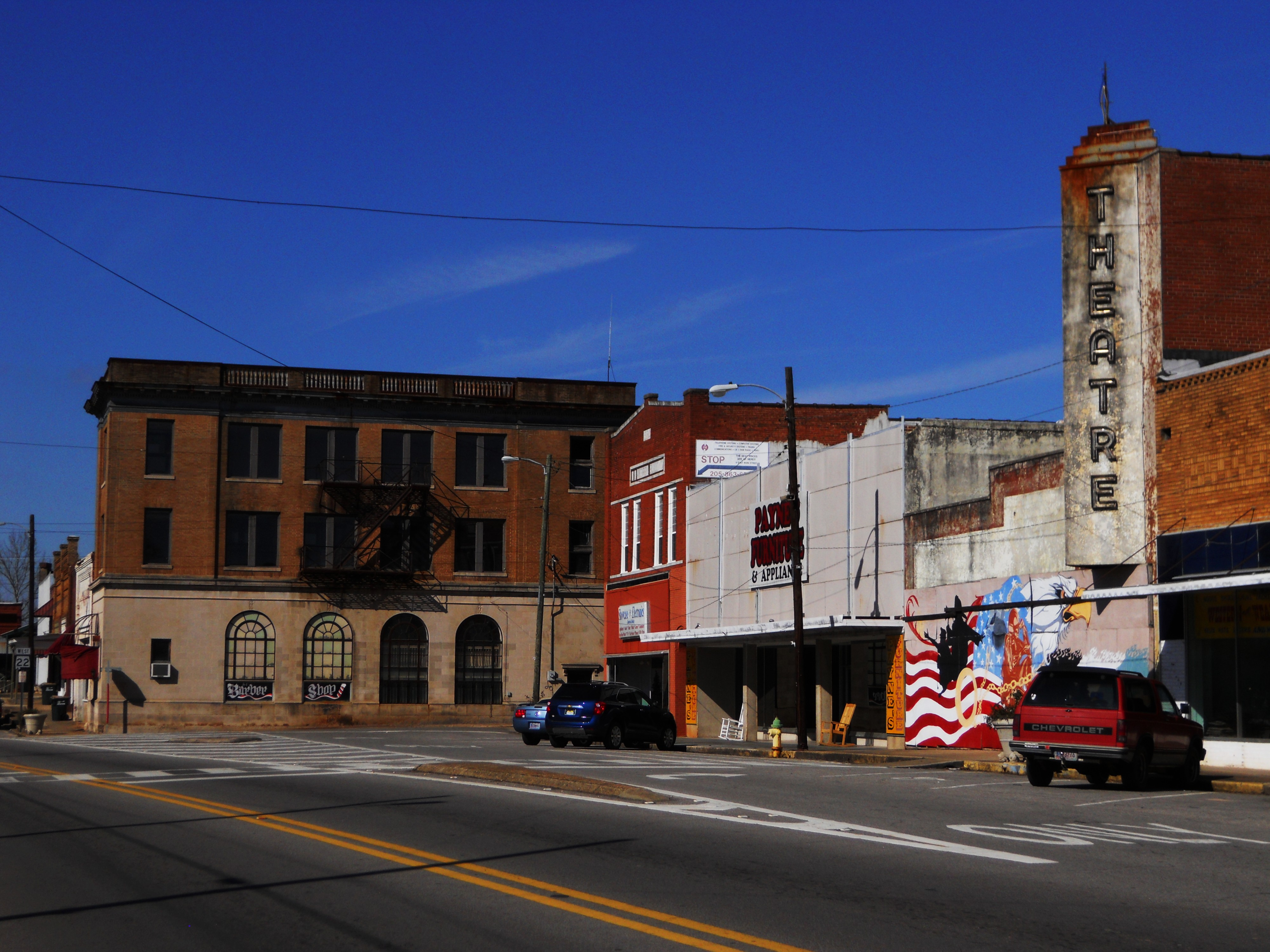
- Downtown Roanoke, Alabama

- Location of Roanoke in Randolph County, Alabama.
- Coordinates: 33°08′36″N 85°22′11″W
- Country: United States
- State: Alabama
- County: Randolph

Area
  - Total: 19.12 sq mi (49.51 km^{2})
  - Land: 18.74 sq mi (48.53 km^{2})
  - Water: 0.38 sq mi (0.99 km^{2})
- Elevation: 856 ft (261 m)

Population (2020)
  - Total: 5,311
  - Density: 283.5/sq mi (109.45/km^{2})
- Time zone: UTC-6 (Central (CST))
  - Summer (DST): UTC-5 (CDT)
- ZIP code: 36274
- Area code: 334
- FIPS code: 01-65040
- GNIS feature ID: 2404627
- Website: roanokealabama.org

Roanoke is a city in Randolph County, which is in the Piedmont region of eastern Alabama, United States. As of the 2020 census, the population of the city was 5,311, down from 6,074 in 2010 and 6,563 in 2000.

== History ==
Roanoke was occupied by the Creek before treaties to persuade the Native Americans to cede their land, followed by forced migration under the Indian Removal Act of 1830. The area was part of a broad part of upland developed as cotton plantations worked by enslaved African Americans. The area is still quite rural.

Initially called High Pine in the 1830s after a nearby creek, it was allegedly burned during an Indian uprising in 1836. Renamed Chulafinee in 1840, it was later renamed again for the hometown of one of the early settlers, Roanoke, Virginia. The city was officially incorporated in December 1890.

== Geography ==
The city is located in the southern part of Randolph County along U.S. Route 431, which is the main route through the city. U.S. 431 leads northwest 13 mi (21 km) to Wedowee, the Randolph County seat, and south 21 mi (34 km) to LaFayette. Alabama State Route 22 also runs through the city, leading west 13 mi (21 km) to Wadley and northeast 9 mi (14 km) to the Georgia state line.

According to the U.S. Census Bureau, the city has a total area of 19.1 square miles (49 km^{2}), of which 18.8 square miles (49 km^{2}) is land and 0.3 square miles (0.78 km^{2}) (1.47%) is water.

== Local ==
The Mayor has been Jill Patterson since 2021.

Roanoke has three schools served by Roanoke City Schools: Knight Enloe Elementary (PK-3), Handley Middle School (4–8), and Handley High School (9–12).

On December 1, 2011, the Handley High Tigers won the AHSAA Football Class 3A State Championship. In 2016 and 2020 the Handley High Tigers won the AHSAA 4A state title.

Roanoke is served by a weekly newspaper, The Randolph Leader.

== Demographics ==
Historical population
| Census | Pop. | Note | %± |
|---|---|---|---|
| 1880 | 327 | | — |
| 1890 | 631 | | 93.0% |
| 1900 | 1,155 | | 83.0% |
| 1910 | 2,034 | | 76.1% |
| 1920 | 3,841 | | 88.8% |
| 1930 | 4,373 | | 13.9% |
| 1940 | 4,168 | | −4.7% |
| 1950 | 5,392 | | 29.4% |
| 1960 | 5,288 | | −1.9% |
| 1970 | 5,251 | | −0.7% |
| 1980 | 5,809 | | 10.6% |
| 1990 | 6,362 | | 9.5% |
| 2000 | 6,563 | | 3.2% |
| 2010 | 6,074 | | −7.5% |
| 2020 | 5,311 | | −12.6% |
U.S. Decennial Census; 2013 Estimate

=== 2020 census ===
As of the 2020 census, Roanoke had a population of 5,311. The median age was 41.5 years. 23.7% of residents were under the age of 18 and 19.4% of residents were 65 years of age or older. For every 100 females there were 82.9 males, and for every 100 females age 18 and over there were 77.7 males age 18 and over.

0.0% of residents lived in urban areas, while 100.0% lived in rural areas.

There were 2,145 households in Roanoke, including 1,562 families. Of households, 31.9% had children under the age of 18 living in them. About 33.0% of all households were made up of individuals, and 16.4% had someone living alone who was 65 years of age or older.

There were 2,723 housing units, of which 21.2% were vacant. The homeowner vacancy rate was 2.8% and the rental vacancy rate was 24.9%.

Roanoke racial composition
| Race | Num. | Perc. |
|---|---|---|
| White (non-Hispanic) | 2,851 | 53.68% |
| Black or African American (non-Hispanic) | 2,136 | 40.22% |
| Native American | 7 | 0.13% |
| Asian | 43 | 0.81% |
| Other/Mixed | 191 | 3.6% |
| Hispanic or Latino | 83 | 1.56% |

=== 2010 census ===
At the 2010 census there were 6,074 people in 2,409 households, including 1,538 families, in the city. The population density was 323.1 inhabitants per square mile (124.7/km^{2}). There were 2,817 housing units at an average density of 149.8 per square mile (57.8/km^{2}). The racial makeup of the city was 57.6% White, 40.5% Black or African American, 0.2% Native American, 0.6% Asian, 0.2% from other races, and 0.9% from two or more races. 1.2% of the population were Hispanic or Latino of any race. Of the 2,409 households 29.1% had children under the age of 18 living with them, 38.1% were married couples living together, 21.8% had a female householder with no husband present, and 36.2% were non-families. 33.1% of households were one person and 15.5% were one person aged 65 or older. The average household size was 2.45 and the average family size was 3.11.

The age distribution was 26.9% under the age of 18, 8.0% from 18 to 24, 23.5% from 25 to 44, 24.5% from 45 to 64, and 17.2% 65 or older. The median age was 37.8 years. For every 100 females, there were 80.0 males. For every 100 females age 18 and over, there were 83.4 males.

The median household income was $30,073 and the median family income was $37,007. Males had a median income of $35,096 versus $31,406 for females. The per capita income for the city was $20,286. About 25.8% of families and 31.0% of the population were below 47.7% of those younger than 18 and 13.5% of those age 65 or older.

=== 2000 census ===
At the 2000 census there were 6,563 people in 2,467 households, including 1,660 families, in the city. The population density was 348.9 inhabitants per square mile (134.7/km^{2}). There were 2,792 housing units at an average density of 148.4 per square mile (57.3/km^{2}). The racial makeup of the city was 58.94% White, 39.77% Black or African American, 0.06% Native American, 0.26% Asian, 0.34% from other races, and 0.64% from two or more races. 1.19% of the population were Hispanic or Latino of any race. Of the 2,467 households 30.6% had children under the age of 18 living with them, 46.9% were married couples living together, 17.3% had a female householder with no husband present, and 32.7% were non-families. 30.2% of households were one person and 13.5% were one person aged 65 or older. The average household size was 2.51 and the average family size was 3.12.

The age distribution was 26.0% under the age of 18, 8.7% from 18 to 24, 25.3% from 25 to 44, 20.8% from 45 to 64, and 19.2% 65 or older. The median age was 37 years. For every 100 females, there were 86.8 males. For every 100 females age 18 and over, there were 79.4 males.

The median household income was $26,946 and the median family income was $32,405. Males had a median income of $29,594 versus $22,135 for females. The per capita income for the city was $14,088. About 11.9% of families and 18.6% of the population were below 7% of those younger than 18 and 15.8% of those age 65 or older.

== Notable people ==
- Bradley Bozeman, University of Alabama football player and current NFL football player
- Admiral Edward A. Burkhalter, Chief of Naval Intelligence; Director of Intelligence Community, CIA
- Wilkie Clark, African-American entrepreneur and civil rights activist
- Jake Daniel, former Major League Baseball player
- George Eddy, American-French basketball commentator and player
- Horace Gillom, former Cleveland Browns football player
- William Anderson Handley, former congressman
- Fred Hyatt, former Auburn University and professional football wide receiver
- Odell McLeod, country-gospel singer, radio entertainer, and songwriter
- Stanley O'Neal, former chairman and chief executive officer of Merrill Lynch
- Clare Purcell, former bishop of the Methodist Church
- Ella Gaunt Smith, doll manufacturer
- David Vann, mayor of Birmingham, Alabama
