= Mardisville, Alabama =

- Unincorporated community
- Location within Alabama Location within the United States
- Coordinates: 33°23′04″N 86°09′33″W
- Country: United States
- State: Alabama
- County: Talladega
- Elevation: 509 ft (155 m)
- Time zone: UTC-6 (Central (CST))
  - Summer (DST): UTC-5 (CDT)
- Area codes: 256 & 938
- GNIS feature ID: 166157

Mardisville, also known as Jumpers Spring, is an unincorporated community in Talladega County, Alabama, United States.

== History ==
The community was originally called Jumpers Spring, purportedly named after a local Creek Indian who lived in the area. The Creek had long controlled this territory as its indigenous inhabitants.

After the United States enforced Indian Removal in the 1830s of most of the Creek people to west of the Mississippi River in Indian Territory, the United States General Land Office opened here in 1834 to sell land. It operated in Mardisville until 1842.

The community was renamed Mardisville in honor of Samuel Wright Mardis, who served as the land agent until his death. At one point, the community was home to a sixteen-room tavern, wood shop, tailor shop, general store, cake shop, bakery, and several churches. It was a trading center for a rural area devoted to cotton plantations. A post office called Mardisville was established in 1833, and operated until 1881.

== Notable people ==
- Joab Lawler, U.S. Representative from 1835 to 1838
- Micah Taul, U.S. Representative from Kentucky from 1815 to 1817. Moved to Mardisville. Grandfather of Taul Bradford.
