= Benjamin White Norris =

American politician (1819–1873)

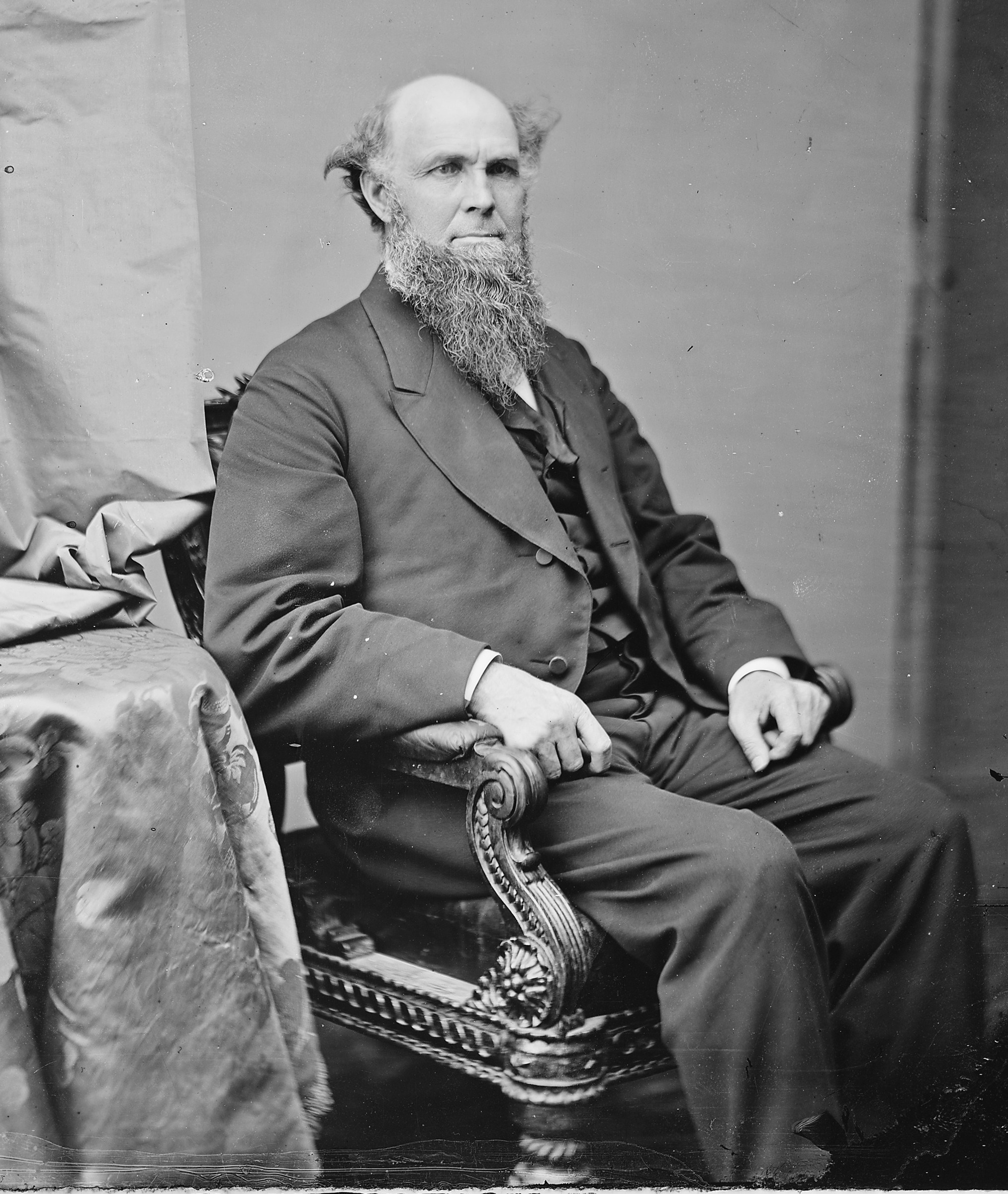
- Norris c. 1860 – c. 1865

Member of the U.S. House of Representatives from Alabama's 3rd district
- In office July 21, 1868 – March 3, 1869
- Preceded by: David Clopton
- Succeeded by: Robert Stell Heflin

Chairman of the Alabama Republican Party
- In office 1868–1870

Land Agent of the State of Maine
- In office 1860–1863

Member of the Alabama constitutional convention
- In office 1868

Personal details
- Born: Benjamin White Norris; January 22, 1819 Monmouth, Maine, U.S.
- Died: January 26, 1873 (aged 54) Montgomery, Alabama, U.S.
- Resting place: South Cemetery, Skowhegan
- Party: Republican
- Occupation: Lawyer

Benjamin White Norris (January 22, 1819 – January 26, 1873) was an American politician. A member of the Republican Party, he was a U.S. representative from Alabama.

== Early life and education ==
Norris was born on January 22, 1819 in Monmouth, Maine.

Norris prepared for college at Monmouth Academy, and graduated from Waterville College (now Colby College), Maine, in 1843. He taught one term in Kents Hill Seminary.

He then worked in the grocery business in Skowhegan, Maine. He served as delegate to the Free-Soil Convention at Buffalo in 1848. He went to California in 1849, remaining one year, then returned to Skowhegan, and studied law.

He was admitted to the bar of Somerset County in January 1852 and commenced practice there.

== Political career ==
Norris served as land agent for the State of Maine, 1860–1863, and was a delegate to the Republican National Convention in 1864. He served as paymaster in the Union Army in 1864 and 1865. He was appointed major and additional paymaster in the Bureau of Freedmen and Abandoned Lands, serving from May 1 to August 2, 1865, at Mobile, Alabama.

Norris resided on a plantation in Wetumpka, Elmore County until 1872. He served as a member of the constitutional convention of Alabama in 1868. Upon the readmission of Alabama to representation, he was elected as a Republican to the Fortieth Congress and served from July 21, 1868, to March 3, 1869. He was an unsuccessful candidate for election in 1870 to the Forty-second Congress. He was also the 2nd Chairman of the Alabama Republican Party, holding the position from 1868 to 1870.

== Death ==
He died in Montgomery, Alabama, January 26, 1873. He was interred in South Cemetery, Skowhegan, Maine.

U.S. House of Representatives
Preceded by District inactive	Member of the U.S. House of Representatives from Alabama's 3rd congressional district July 21, 1868 - March 3, 1869	Succeeded by Robert S. Heflin
