= Eastern Alabama Railway =

Railroad company in the United States

Eastern Alabama Railway, LLC

Overview
- Headquarters: Sylacauga, Alabama
- Reporting mark: EARY
- Locale: Talladega, Alabama to Sylacauga, Alabama
- Dates of operation: November 26, 1990–

Technical
- Track gauge: 4 ft 8 1/2 in (1,435 mm) standard gauge
- Length: 27 miles (43 km)

Other
- Website: Official website

Eastern Alabama Railway, LLC (reporting mark EARY) is one of many short line railroad companies owned by Genesee & Wyoming, Inc. On November 26, 1990, the line was sold by CSX to the Eastern Alabama Railway, a subsidiary of Kyle Railways. Kyle Railways later sold the EARY to RailAmerica in 2002 and RailAmerica was acquired by Genesee & Wyoming in 2012.

The line, which is 27 miles (43 km) long, was constructed in 1883 as a narrow gauge railroad known as the Anniston and Atlantic Railroad. On July 19, 1889, the Anniston & Atlantic Railroad became part of the Louisville and Nashville Railroad under the Alabama Mineral Railroad. The L&N became part of the Seaboard System in 1982 and the CSX in 1986.

The EARY also operated a separate line running from Wellington to Anniston, Alabama. The Wellington line was abandoned in November 1992. The Wellington line was also former Louisville & Nashville track and ran through Alexandria - Mahlep - Gladden Jct - Leatherwood - Blue Mountain.

== Traffic ==
The railroad's main commodities are limestone, urea, paper products, and food products. The EARY hauled around 15,000 carloads in 2008.

== Towns served ==
- Talladega, Alabama Interchange with CSX
- Bemiston, Alabama
- Sycamore, Alabama
- Sylacauga, Alabama Location of Enginehouse and interchange with Norfolk Southern
- Gantts Quarry, Alabama

== Summary of operations ==
- Anniston and Atlantic Railroad 1883 - 1889
- Louisville and Nashville Railroad/Alabama Mineral Railroad: 1889 - 1982
- Seaboard System Railroad: 1982 - July 1, 1986
- CSX Transportation: July 1, 1986 - November 26, 1990

== See also ==
- List of United States railroads
- List of Alabama railroads

== Sources ==
- Edward A. Lewis, American Shortline Railway Guide 5th ed., (Kalmbach Books, 1996).
- Mike Walker, SPV's Comprehensive Railroad Atlas of North America - Southern States (Steam Powered Publishing & SPV, 2001) Ownership and detail of rail line.
- North America Railroad Map Software v 2.13, (Railway Station Productions, 2004)
