= Bemis, Tennessee =

- Bemis Historic District
- U.S. National Register of Historic Places
- U.S. Historic district
- Location within Tennessee Location within the United States
- Location: Roughly bounded by D St., the Illinois Central Gulf RR tracks, Sixth St. and rural property lines to the W and S, Jackson, Tennessee, United States
- Coordinates: 35°34′33″N 88°49′17″W
- Area: 450 acres (1.8 km^{2})
- Built: 1900
- Architect: Multiple
- Architectural style: Bungalow/craftsman; Mission/Spanish Revival; Dutch Colonial Revival; Shotgun
- NRHP reference No.: 91001777
- Added to NRHP: December 16, 1991

Bemis is a former company town in Madison County, Tennessee, United States, now part of the city of Jackson. The Bemis Brothers Bag Company established the town in 1900 to be the site of a cotton mill and housing for the mill workers. A 450-acre (180 ha) area of Bemis was added to the National Register of Historic Places in 1991 as the Bemis Historic District. Much of the area is also a local historic district.

== History ==
Around 1900, Judson Moss Bemis, founder and head of the Bemis company, decided that it would be advantageous for his company to have a cotton mill in a cotton-growing area in the southern United States. The site in Madison County was selected after the county government agreed to purchase 300 acres (120 ha) near the Illinois Central rail line and transfer it to the bag company for the project. Construction began in 1900 and the first mill, with capacity of 21,000 spindles, was in operation by June of the following year.

A planned community was built around the production facilities, largely under the direction of Albert Farwell Bemis, the son of Judson Bemis. Albert Bemis had trained as a civil engineer at the Massachusetts Institute of Technology. He endeavored to make the community appear to have grown over time. Several distinct residential neighborhoods were built around the mill buildings. Each neighborhood had its own set of varied house designs patterned upon the region's characteristic house styles, including shotgun and double shotgun, cubical, L-plan, and hall-and-parlor designs. The first of the residential neighborhoods, named Old Bemis, was built in 1900. A second neighborhood, named Bicycle Hill, was built in 1903 to support a new mill facility that opened that year. A segregated neighborhood for African American workers was created on a street named Congo Street (later renamed Butler Street) between 1903 and 1905. Additional residential areas were built later, including the Silver Circle neighborhood in 1919–1921 and West Bemis in 1926.

Community facilities provided in Bemis included schools, churches, sidewalks, fire protection services, company stores, a United States post office, a hotel, a boarding house, a railroad depot, an 850-seat auditorium designed by Massachusetts architect Andrew Hepburn and completed in 1922, a YMCA building, a swimming pool, parks, a bath house, a six-hole golf course, and a company farm. Atypical for a company town, employees were not required to live in Bemis; transportation services were available for employees living elsewhere.

The mills at Bemis produced complete lines of fabric sheeting and thread for shipment to other Bemis company facilities for use in sewing bags. In 1950, the company reported that its mills in Bemis held 50,000 spindles and 1,710 looms and that they employed 1,250 workers who processed 26,000 bales of cotton annually, producing 50 million yards (45,720,000 m) of cotton cloth and one million pounds (about 450,000 kg) of thread. The success of the community for the Bemis Company helped encourage the company to establish a second company town, Bemiston in Alabama (now part of Talladega), in the late 1920s.

Around 1965, the Bemis company began a process of selling off the company town. Workers were given the opportunity to purchase houses with company financing. By the end of the decade, most of the houses had been sold.

In 1977, Bemis was annexed by the city of Jackson. In 1976, Bemis lost its status as a postal city, but the post office continued to operate. The Bemis Company sold the mills in 1980. The new owner operated them until 1991.

In 1991, the year that the mills closed, Bemis was listed on the National Register of Historic Places as the Bemis Historic District. The listing included 450 acres (180 ha) and 511 contributing buildings, three contributing sites, eight contributing structures, and one contributing object. Buildings of particular interest in the historic district include the cotton mill building, the auditorium which now houses the Bemis Museum; and the Bemis United Methodist Church, built in 1908 as the Union Church to serve residents all faiths and later dedicated as a Methodist church after several other denominations had built churches in Bemis.

In 2014, the city of Jackson announced plans to tear down the Bemis Mill and create a memorial park on the site where it stood. Although the mill was included in the Bemis National Register historic district, it was not part of the local historic district, so it was not protected by local historic district regulations against demolition of historic properties.

It has been noted by Tennessee Historical Society authors that shotgun houses were disappearing due to negative real estate pressure in nearby downtown Jackson, Tennessee, but were valued and being preserved by homeowners and the community of Bemis.

Industrial facilities currently operating in Bemis include the cotton gin and a modern cotton warehouse located south of the old Bemis Mill.
