= Sylacauga, Alabama =

City in Alabama, United States

- City
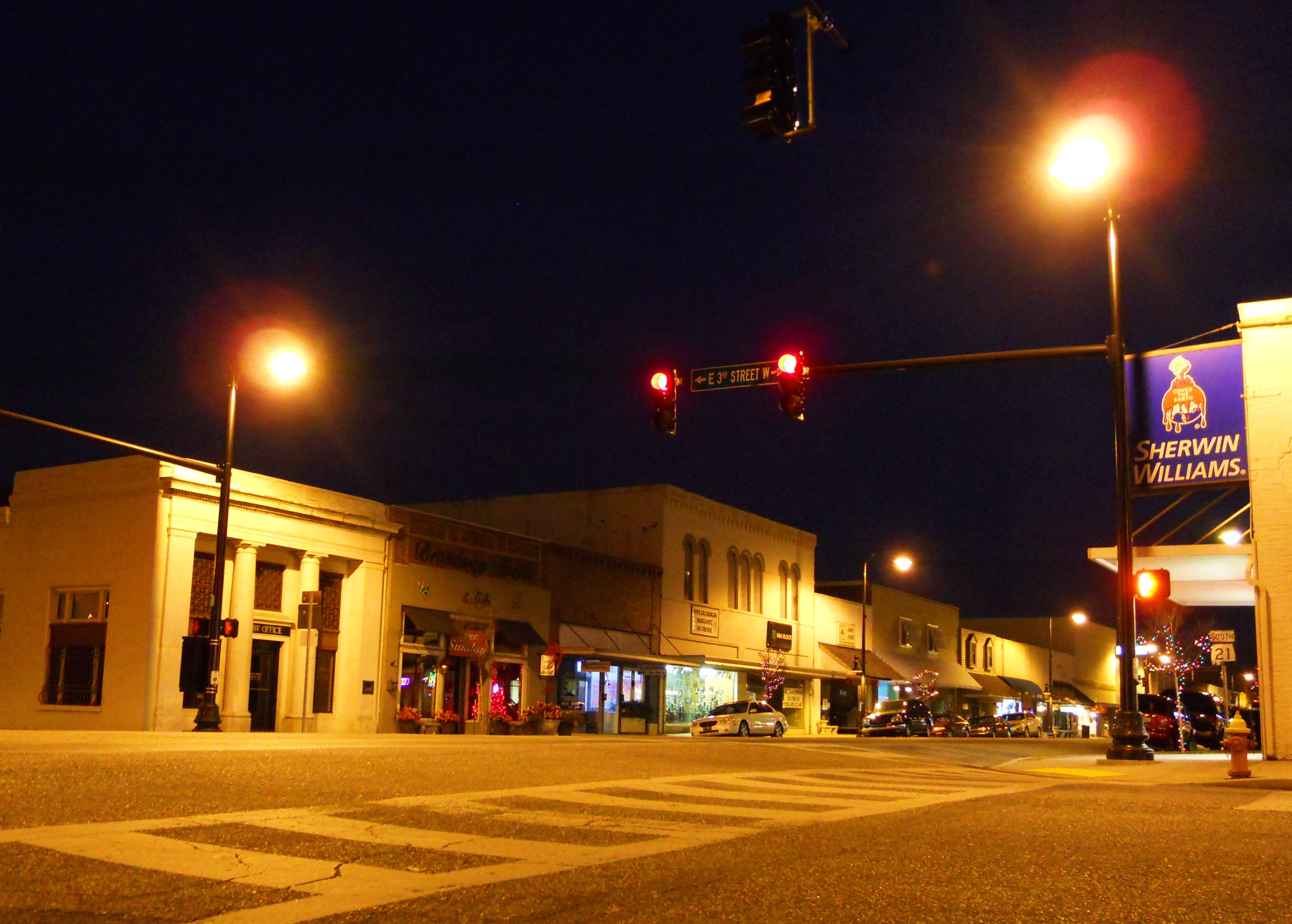
- Downtown Sylacauga by night

- Flag Seal
- Nicknames: "The Marble City"; "Buzzard's Roost"; "Alabama's Best-Kept Secret"
- Location of Sylacauga in Talladega County, Alabama
- Coordinates: 33°10′22″N 86°14′04″W
- Country: United States
- State: Alabama
- County: Talladega

Area
  - Total: 20.42 sq mi (52.88 km^{2})
  - Land: 20.25 sq mi (52.46 km^{2})
  - Water: 0.16 sq mi (0.42 km^{2})
- Elevation: 545 ft (166 m)

Population (2020)
  - Total: 12,578
  - Density: 621.0/sq mi (239.78/km^{2})
- Time zone: UTC-6 (Central (CST))
  - Summer (DST): UTC-5 (CDT)
- ZIP codes: 35150-35151
- Area code: 256/938
- FIPS code: 01-74352
- GNIS feature ID: 2405558
- Website: www.cityofsylacauga.net

Sylacauga is a city in Talladega County, Alabama, United States. At the 2020 census, the population was 12,578.

Sylacauga is known for its fine white marble bedrock. This was discovered shortly after settlers moved into the area and has been quarried ever since. The marble industry was the first recorded industry in the Sylacauga area.

Sylacauga is the site of the first documented case of an object from outer space hitting a person. On November 30, 1954, a 4 kg (9 lb) piece of what became known as the Hodges Fragment from the Sylacauga Meteorite crashed through the roof of an Oak Grove house, bounced off a radio, and badly bruised Ann Hodges, who was taking an afternoon nap.

== History ==
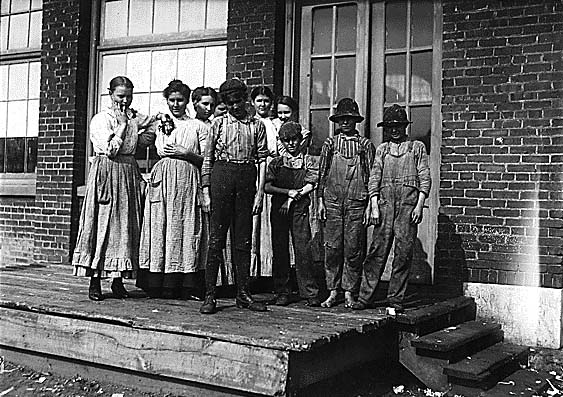
Child workers at Central Mills in Sylacauga, 1910. Photo by Lewis Hine.

The first historical account of the area comes from de Soto's chroniclers as his expedition traveled south along the east bank of the Coosa River in 1540, encountering the town of Talisi at the edges of the Mississippian-era chiefdoms of Coosa and Tuskaloosa. The inhabitants of the Coosa River Valley were later united as the confederacy of Creek people. Their later encounters with Spanish and French settlers had a significant influence on the history of Sylacauga.

Events that occurred among these three groups were partly responsible for the settlement of the village of Chalakagay in 1748 near modern Sylacauga by refugee Shawnee Indians, led by Peter Chartier. In 1759 Chalakagay was listed in the French territorial records as a town inhabited by 50 Shawnee warriors. Late in the summer of 1836 most of the remaining Native Americans in Alabama were rounded up and forcibly escorted west of the Mississippi River, by United States Army forces under the authorization of the Indian Removal Act. They were forced to cede their land claims in the Southeast to yield to development by European Americans.

The name Sy-la-cau-ga may derive from the Indian words Chalaka-ge, which mean "The Place of the Chalaka Tribe". Other scholars suggest that the name derives from the Creek words "suli" (buzzards) and "kagi" (roost). The city was first incorporated in 1838 as Syllacoga, and again in 1887 as Sylacauga.

Several important roads traversed the region as early as the 1830s. Numerous ferries connected communities on opposite sides of the rivers. In 1852, a plank road was built from Montgomery, the capital, to Winterboro, Alabama, passing through Sylacauga. The first railroad through Sylacauga was the Anniston and Atlantic Railroad, completed through here on December 1, 1886. In 1838, the first Sylacauga post office was established, with George Washington Stone as postmaster. He later served as Chief Justice of the Alabama Supreme Court.

The first newspaper, the Sylacauga Argus, started publication in 1887. The paper was printed and edited in Calera by H.G. McCall.

Sylacauga's main thoroughfare is Broadway Avenue. The first building on this street was built in 1890 by the Smith Brothers.

Known as "The Marble City", Sylacauga was developed on a solid deposit of what is claimed to be the finest marble in the world. Some buildings in the country, such as the United States Supreme Court, the Al Jolson Shrine in California, the Woolworth building in Houston, Texas, and many others have been constructed and ornamented with Sylacauga marble.

Sylacauga is located slightly to the east of the geographical center of the state of Alabama in Talladega County. The city is roughly 51 miles (82 km) southeast of Birmingham, 63 miles (101 km) north of Montgomery, and 40 miles (64 km) southwest of Anniston, Alabama.

=== Marble industry ===
The first recorded discovery of marble was in 1820 by Dr. Edward Gantt, a physician who had accompanied General Andrew Jackson through the area in 1814. Even Gantt probably did not realize the extent of this calcium carbonate deposit. The deposit is part of the "Murphy Marble Belt", extending 32 by 1.5 miles (51.5 by 2.4 km) by 400 feet (120 m) deep. It is the world's largest commercial deposit of madre cream marble.

In the 1830s, several quarries were opened in Talladega County and perhaps one in neighboring Coosa County. Using the old Plank Road, the operators shipped marble throughout central Alabama. By 1906, New York interests had bought Gantt's quarry from its Ocala, Florida investors. This site became the center of marble-working activity. An elite town developed in and around this property, later called the Alabama Marble Company.

By the start of the 20th century, Sylacauga quarries had an established reputation, and shipments were being made throughout the state. Although structural marble was being produced to some extent, a very lucrative use of marble was found in the steel industry. More and more of the Sylacauga deposits were being blasted and used for fluxing steel. Later dolomite replaced marble in this process. In spite of the approaching depression, the late 1920s and early 1930s were times of spectacular growth for Sylacauga's marble industry.

Technology changed the course of the industry when electricity replaced steam. Countless small marble operations had sprung up throughout the years. Facing tough competition, many went out of business or were absorbed by the larger companies, Alabama and Moretti-Harrah. One such significant merger was in 1929 when the Madras Marble Company (formerly Sylacauga Marble Corporation) merged with Moretti-Harrah.

In 1935 the Moretti-Harrah Company was sold to B.F. Coggins of Atlanta and T.A. McGahey of Columbus, Mississippi. In 1944 Coggins sold the Sylacauga operation and Columbia Marble Company of North Carolina to McGahey. The Alabama Marble Company remained under its own management until 1963, when it merged with the Georgia Marble Company.

The reputation of Sylacauga marble producers was shown by use of their marble on numerous building projects throughout the nation. Alabama Marble Company supplied marble for the 19th-century projects in Washington, DC, the Washington Monument and Lincoln Memorial. Marble supplied for the Washington monument was so like its Italian counterpart, Carrara marble, that it was placed aside until a confirmation of its origin could be made. Moretti-Harrah, in a 3 1/2 year project shared with Gray-Knox Marble Company of Knoxville, supplied much of the marble for the U.S. Supreme Court building, including 36 massive interior columns measuring 22’ long x 3’4” in diameter.

Listing all the buildings that use this lustrous stone would be difficult. Other memorable projects are the Dime Savings Bank (New York), the Mercedes-Benz showroom (New York), the Chicago Post Office, the Alabama Archives Building, the Chrysler Mausoleum (New York), and the Al Jolson Shrine (California). Cream marble from Sylacauga can be found in hotels, offices, mausoleums, memorials and homes across the country.

Noted sculptor Gutzon Borglum, creator of the Mount Rushmore National Memorial, sculpted a masterpiece from Alabama marble – the bust of Abraham Lincoln. It is located in the rotunda of the nation's Capitol. Borglum commented that the fine texture of Alabama marble enabled him to portray the expression of kindness on Lincoln's face that he had never been able to do with any other stone.

By the 1940s endless uses for calcium products extracted from marble deposits became obvious. Calcium was needed for agricultural, pharmaceutical and paint products. Alabama Marble Company had already moved in this direction, having introduced its first Raymond Mill products for animal feed, insecticides, and joint cement materials in 1933. By-products were sold under the name of Alabama Calcium Products. By 1964, the company had completed one of the largest multi-product calcium carbonate plants in the United States, and in 1967 it closed its structural marble plant.

Moretti-Harrah chose to continue its structural finishing operations. With increasingly fast and updated precision machinery, it introduced new lines of tile, window sills, and other building products. In addition, Moretti-Harrah expanded operations to include calcium products, entering into a partnership with Thompson-Weinman and Company of Cartersville, Georgia, in 1944. In 1956, Thompson-Weinman expanded its own crushing operation in Sylacauga. Sylacauga Calcium Products was formed as a division of Moretti-Harrah.

Thompson, Weinman and Company remained privately owned until 1975, when it was purchased by Cyprus Mines Corporation. In 1979 Cyprus Mines was purchased by Standard Oil Company of Indiana, and it became a subsidiary of Amoco Minerals Company.

In 1983 an expansion project of its calcium carbonate facilities was conducted. The expansion involved the installation of additional grinding capacity and new mill facilities to enable increased production. Calcium carbonate, long used as the coating of paper, became an important filler as the paper industry converted from acid-based paper making systems to alkaline systems. In 1988 English China Clays (ECC) International purchased Moretti Harrah, and in 1989 ECC purchased Cyprus Thompson Weinman. Then, Georgia Marble Company purchased Cyprus Thompson Weinman.

In 1995, Imetal Group of Paris acquired the Georgia Marble Company, allowing this international company to strengthen its U.S. presence in the white pigments industry. Between 1994 and 1998, Imetal doubled in size; one-third through sales growth and two-thirds through acquisition. In 1999, Imetal acquired ECC. At that time the corporate name was changed to Imerys, to reflect a new minerals processing organization.

== Geography ==
=== Location ===
The city is located in southern Talladega County. Major highways that run through the city include US Routes 280 and 231, as well as Alabama State Route 21. US 280 runs northwest to southeast through the city, leading northwest (with US 231) 10 mi (16 km) to Childersburg and 47 mi (76 km) to Birmingham. US 280 runs southeast 26 mi (42 km) to Alexander City and US 231 runs south 21 mi (34 km) to Rockford. Alabama 21 runs northeast 21 mi (34 km) to the city of Talladega.

=== Climate ===
The climate in this area is characterized by hot, humid summers and generally mild to cool winters. According to the Köppen Climate Classification system, Sylacauga has a humid subtropical climate, abbreviated "Cfa" on climate maps.

Climate data for Sylacauga, Alabama (1991–2020 normals, extremes 1955–present)
Month	Jan	Feb	Mar	Apr	May	Jun	Jul	Aug	Sep	Oct	Nov	Dec	Year
Record high °F (°C)	80 (27)	83 (28)	90 (32)	91 (33)	99 (37)	101 (38)	102 (39)	104 (40)	99 (37)	99 (37)	88 (31)	80 (27)	104 (40)
Mean daily maximum °F (°C)	54.5 (12.5)	58.7 (14.8)	66.7 (19.3)	74.6 (23.7)	81.3 (27.4)	87.3 (30.7)	90.3 (32.4)	89.4 (31.9)	85.0 (29.4)	75.6 (24.2)	65.0 (18.3)	56.8 (13.8)	73.8 (23.2)
Daily mean °F (°C)	42.9 (6.1)	46.5 (8.1)	54.0 (12.2)	61.0 (16.1)	69.1 (20.6)	76.2 (24.6)	79.4 (26.3)	78.4 (25.8)	73.2 (22.9)	62.2 (16.8)	51.7 (10.9)	45.3 (7.4)	61.7 (16.5)
Mean daily minimum °F (°C)	31.4 (−0.3)	34.4 (1.3)	41.3 (5.2)	47.5 (8.6)	56.9 (13.8)	65.1 (18.4)	68.5 (20.3)	67.4 (19.7)	61.4 (16.3)	48.8 (9.3)	38.5 (3.6)	33.8 (1.0)	49.6 (9.8)
Record low °F (°C)	−4 (−20)	4 (−16)	10 (−12)	21 (−6)	33 (1)	39 (4)	50 (10)	45 (7)	32 (0)	21 (−6)	14 (−10)	3 (−16)	−4 (−20)
Average precipitation inches (mm)	5.55 (141)	5.88 (149)	5.45 (138)	4.79 (122)	4.40 (112)	4.97 (126)	4.62 (117)	4.32 (110)	3.70 (94)	3.46 (88)	4.71 (120)	5.25 (133)	57.10 (1,450)
Average snowfall inches (cm)	0.4 (1.0)	0.1 (0.25)	1.2 (3.0)	0.0 (0.0)	0.0 (0.0)	0.0 (0.0)	0.0 (0.0)	0.0 (0.0)	0.0 (0.0)	0.0 (0.0)	0.0 (0.0)	0.0 (0.0)	1.7 (4.3)
Average precipitation days (≥ 0.01 in)	9.8	9.7	9.5	8.2	8.8	10.3	10.6	9.4	6.8	6.2	7.2	10.0	106.5
Average snowy days (≥ 0.1 in)	0.2	0.1	0.1	0.0	0.0	0.0	0.0	0.0	0.0	0.0	0.0	0.0	0.4
Source: NOAA

== Demographics ==
Historical population
Census	Pop.	Note	%±
1890	464		—
1900	880		89.7%
1910	1,456		65.5%
1920	2,141		47.0%
1930	4,115		92.2%
1940	6,269		52.3%
1950	9,606		53.2%
1960	12,857		33.8%
1970	12,255		−4.7%
1980	12,708		3.7%
1990	12,520		−1.5%
2000	12,616		0.8%
2010	12,749		1.1%
2020	12,578		−1.3%
2025 (est.)	12,055	▼	−4.2%
U.S. Decennial Census

=== 2020 census ===
As of the 2020 census, Sylacauga had a population of 12,578. The median age was 41.6 years. 21.8% of residents were under the age of 18 and 20.0% of residents were 65 years of age or older. For every 100 females there were 81.9 males, and for every 100 females age 18 and over there were 77.3 males age 18 and over.

78.5% of residents lived in urban areas, while 21.5% lived in rural areas.

There were 5,417 households and 2,993 families in Sylacauga. Of all households, 28.8% had children under the age of 18 living in them. Of all households, 36.4% were married-couple households, 18.6% were households with a male householder and no spouse or partner present, and 39.6% were households with a female householder and no spouse or partner present. About 35.2% of all households were made up of individuals and 15.2% had someone living alone who was 65 years of age or older.

There were 6,051 housing units, of which 10.5% were vacant. The homeowner vacancy rate was 2.9% and the rental vacancy rate was 7.1%.

Sylacauga racial composition
Race	Num.	Perc.
White (non-Hispanic)	7,457	59.29%
Black or African American (non-Hispanic)	4,311	34.27%
Native American	32	0.25%
Asian	69	0.55%
Pacific Islander	4	0.03%
Other/Mixed	425	3.38%
Hispanic or Latino	280	2.23%

=== 2010 census ===
As of the census of 2010, there were 12,749 people, 5,215 households, and 3,419 families residing in the town. The population density was 681.0 inhabitants per square mile (262.9/km^{2}). There were 5,748 housing units at an average density of 310.3 per square mile (119.8/km^{2}). The racial makeup of the city was 69.17% White, 28.91% Black or African American, 0.26% Native American, 0.29% Asian, 0.06% Pacific Islander, 0.40% from other races, and 0.91% from two or more races. 0.97% of the population were Hispanic or Latino of any race.

There were 5,215 households, out of which 30.1% had children under the age of 18 living with them, 46.3% were married couples living together, 16.1% had a female householder with no husband present, and 34.4% were non-families. 31.7% of all households were made up of individuals, and 15.5% had someone living alone who was 65 years of age or older. The average household size was 2.37 and the average family size was 3.00.

In the city, the population was spread out, with 25.0% under the age of 18, 8.3% from 18 to 24, 25.9% from 25 to 44, 22.2% from 45 to 64, and 18.6% who were 65 years of age or older. The median age was 39 years. For every 100 females, there were 81.3 males. For every 100 females age 18 and over, there were 77.0 males.

The median income for a household in the city was $29,533, and the median income for a family was $40,275. Males had a median income of $32,092 versus $21,990 for females. The per capita income for the city was $16,209. About 16.6% of families and 21.3% of the population were below the poverty line, including 33.6% of those under age 18 and 16.7% of those age 65 or over.

== Economy ==
The workforce in present-day Sylacauga is divided among the following occupational categories:

- Manufacturing (24.2 percent)
- Educational services, and health care and social assistance (20.2 percent)
- Retail trade (12.0 percent)
- Arts, entertainment, recreation, accommodation, and food services (7.2 percent)
- Finance, insurance, and real estate, rental, and leasing (6.3 percent)
- Construction (6.1 percent)
- Transportation and warehousing and utilities (5.2 percent)
- Other services, except public administration (5.2 percent)
- Professional, scientific, management, and administrative and waste management services (4.9 percent)
- Public administration (3.3 percent)
- Agriculture, forestry, fishing and hunting, and extractive (2.1 percent)
- Wholesale trade (1.6 percent)
- Information (1.6 percent)

Sylacauga supports jobs in the service industry, manufacturing, and retail. Major employers include Blue Bell Creameries, IMERYS, Nemak Alabama, Omya Alabama Inc., Pursell Technologies, Cleveland-Cliffs, Wal-Mart, Home Depot, and the Pursell Farms resort, which includes FarmLinks. More than 140 manufacturers draw employees from the Sylacauga area.

== Annual events and places of interest ==
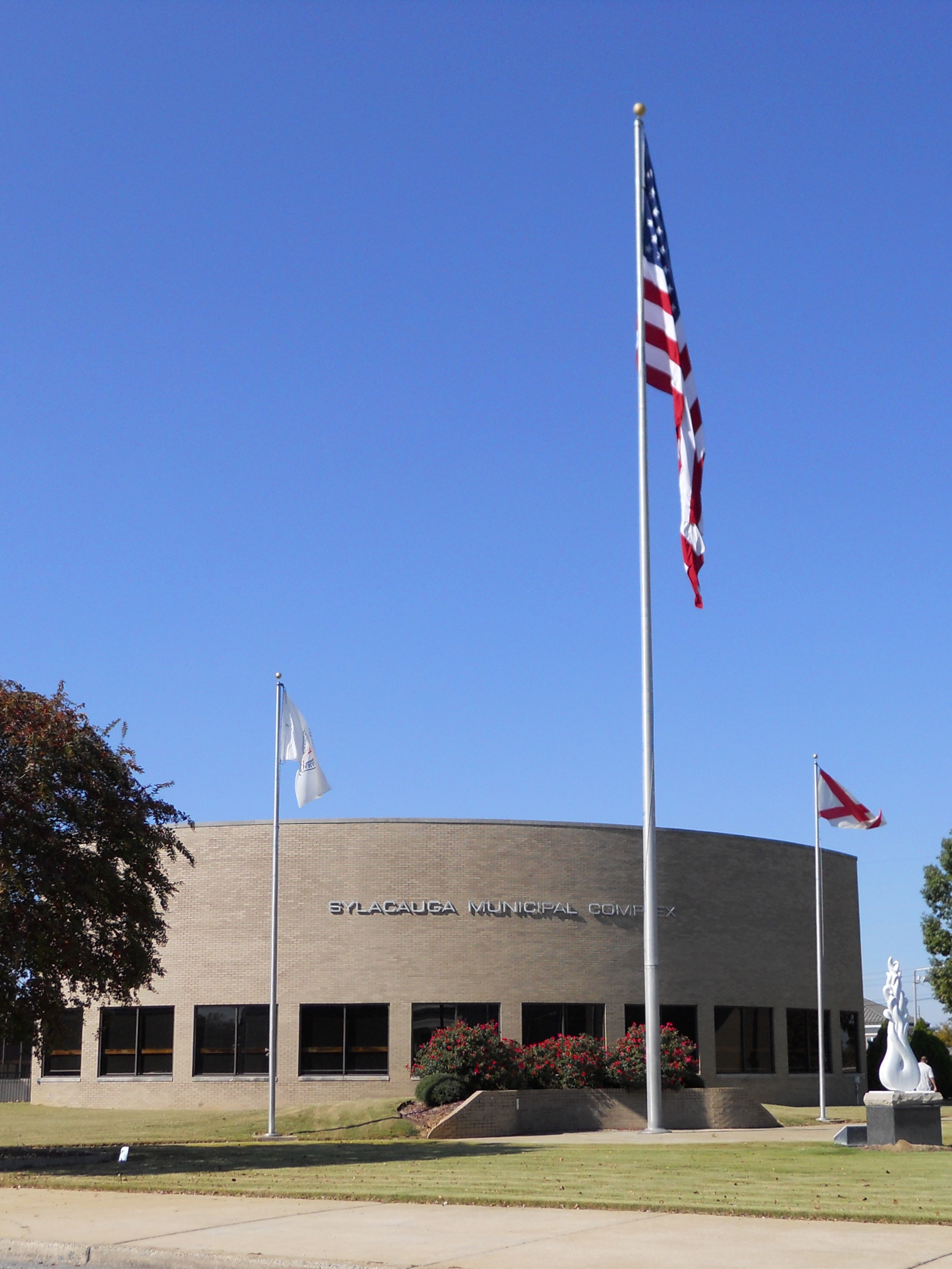
Sylacauga Municipal Complex

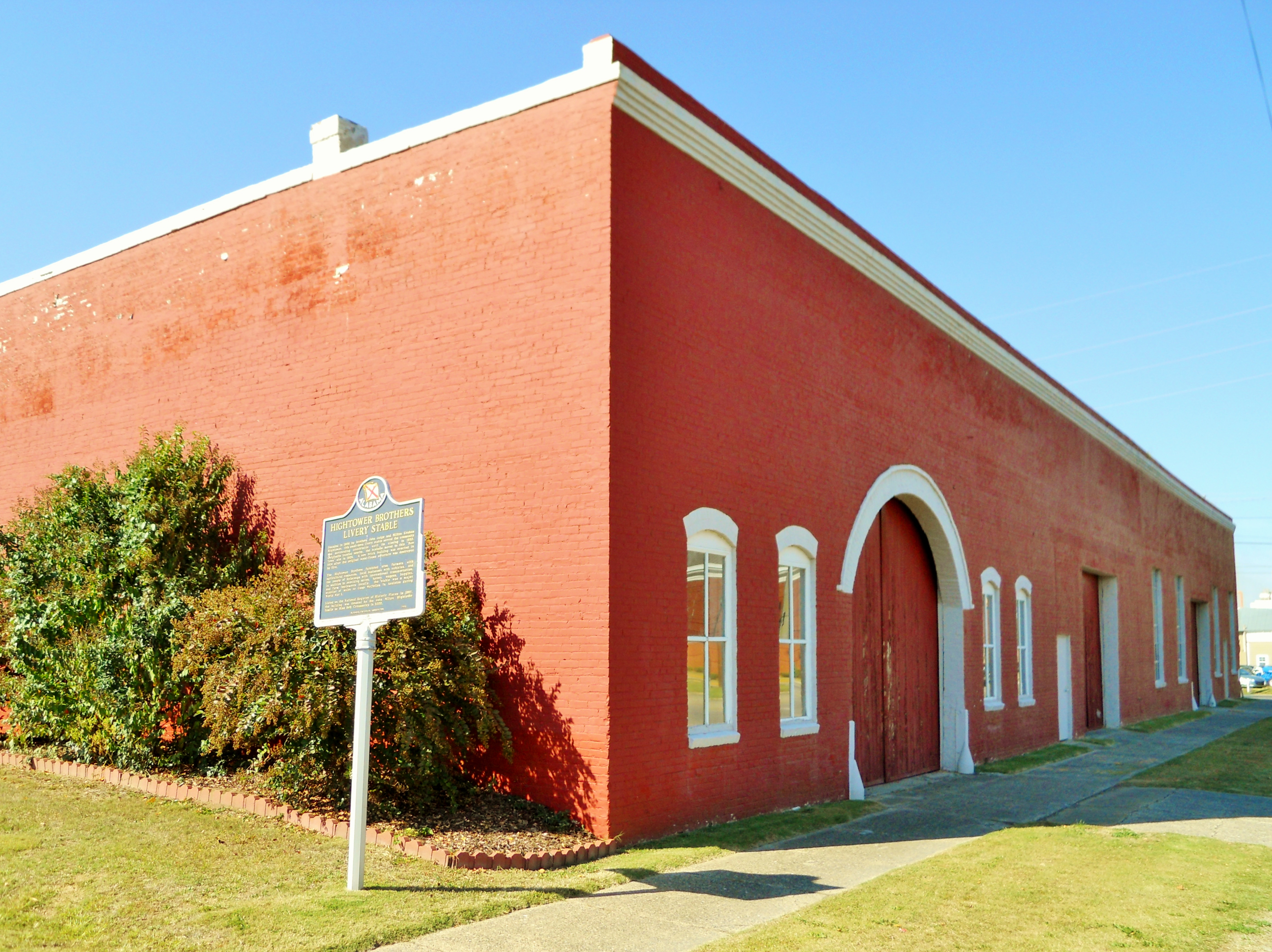
The Hightower Brothers Livery Stable was added to the National Register of Historic Places in 1997.

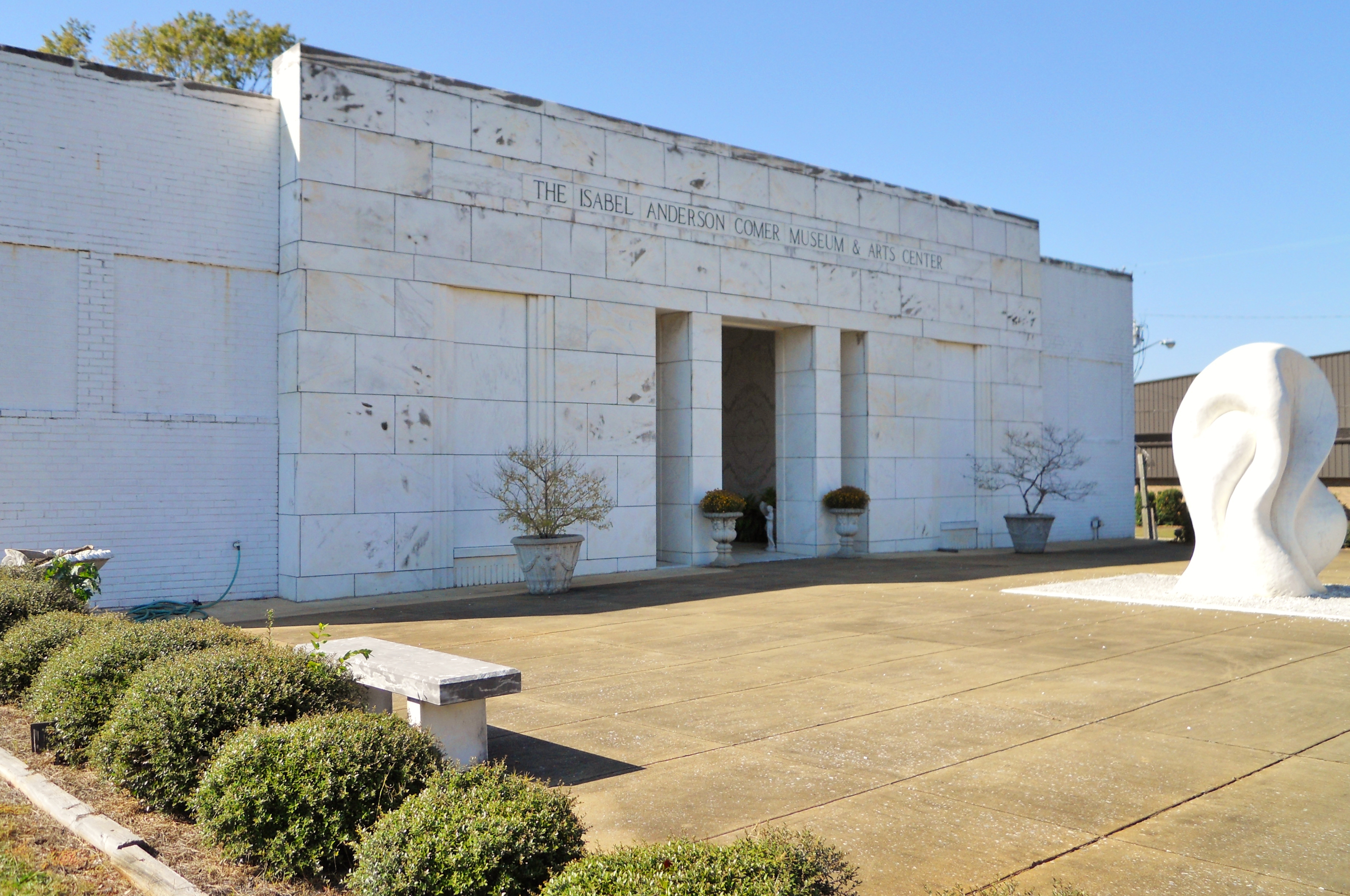
The B.B. Comer Memorial Library was added to the National Register of Historic Places in 2005.

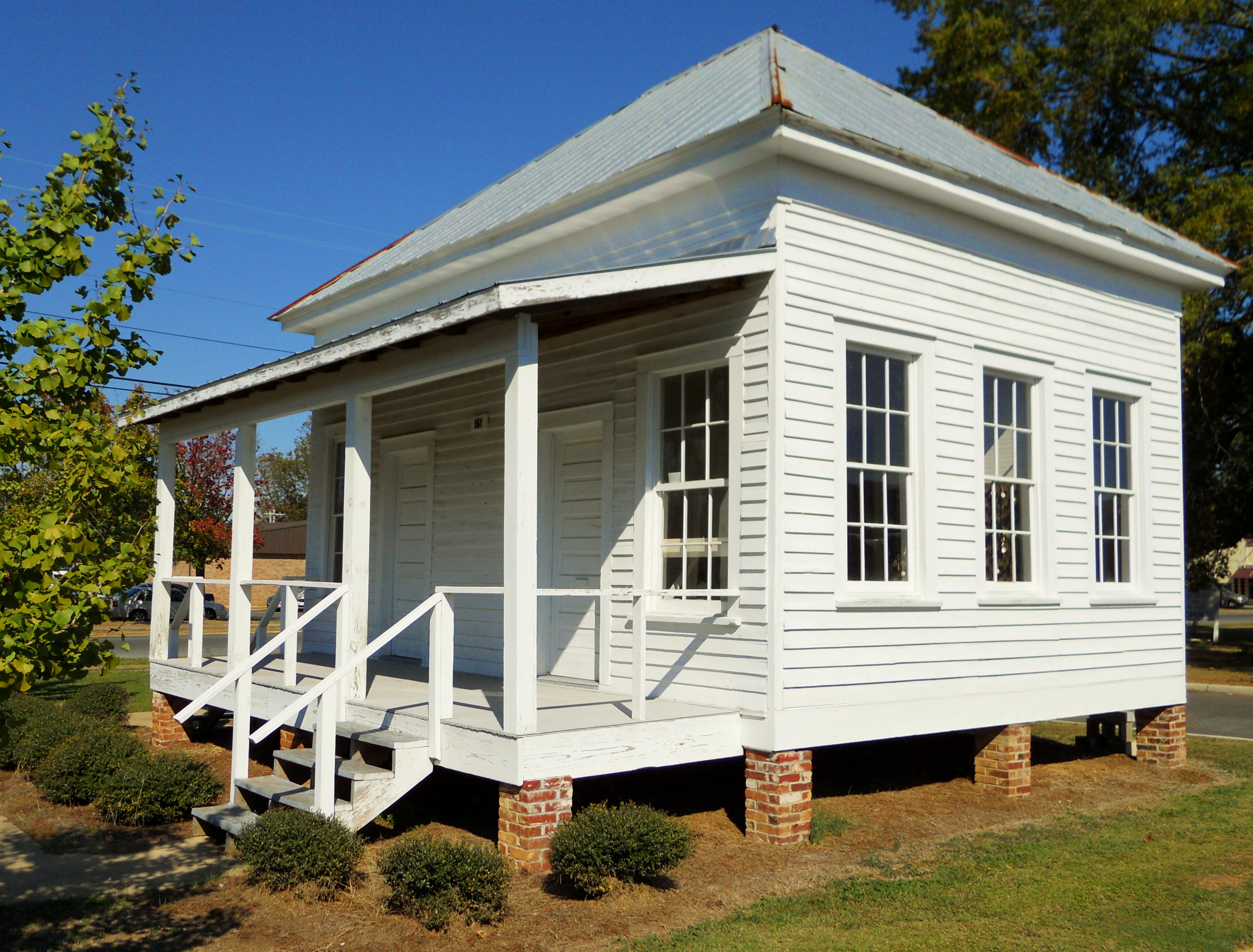
This post office was moved from the nearby ghost town of Gantts Quarry to its current location on North Norton Avenue.

The Sylacauga Public Library, founded in 1936, moved into a new Works Progress Administration (WPA) building in 1939 and was renamed in honor of local factory owner and former Alabama governor B. B. Comer. The present building, erected in 1979, was refurbished and expanded in 2003 to include meeting rooms and a conference center. The B. B. Comer Memorial Library Foundation, formed in 1991, supports education, enrichment, and entertainment for parts of several counties and has won a National Award for Library Service from the Institute of Museum & Library Services. The library's popular Brown Bag lunch series offers a wide range of subjects and often draws crowds in excess of 100 people.

The Isabel Anderson Comer Museum and Arts Center opened in 1985. Housed in the former city library, the museum contains an exhibit of the geological history of Sylacauga marble along with works by the Italian sculptor and quarry investor Giuseppe Moretti, his assistant Geneva Mercer, and contemporary artists Frank Fleming and Craigger Browne. The museum's Native Sons Gallery honors U.S. congressman William Flynt Nichols, U.S. Army Lieutenant General James W. Crysel, whose 33-year military career included receiving the Distinguished Service Medal, and singer and actor Jim Nabors, a 1947 graduate of Sylacauga High School.

In 2009, Sylacauga held its first marble festival as part of a cultural exchange with Pietrasanta in Italy, in connection with the Alabama State Council on the Arts. The community made this festival an annual event that still continues today.

Sylacauga offers many other opportunities for outdoor activities, including Noble Park, with a skate park, playground, and picnic and grill areas as well as a quarter-mile walking track; a city pool that is converted to an indoor pool in the winter months; Lake Howard, which has areas for boating, fishing, and pavilions; several neighborhood parks; the Sylaward Trail, a 15-mile (24 km) hiking and mountain-biking trail that runs through the Talladega National Forest; and two golf courses, Sylacauga Country Club and Farm Links.

== Government ==
Sylacauga is governed via the mayor-council system. The city council consists of five members each elected from one of five districts. The mayor is elected in a citywide vote to a four-year term. The city operates its own full-time police department, fire department, code enforcement, municipal court, street department, recreational department, city clerks office, and utilities board.

== Education ==
The Sylacauga City Schools school system is governed by a five-member board of education, whose members are appointed by the City Council of Sylacauga for staggered five-year terms. This group formulates the policies that govern the system. The day-to-day operation of the school system is entrusted to the Superintendent of Schools, who is appointed by the Board of Education. The school system also must comply with regulations of the State Board of Education, a body of eight elected officials, which oversees state educational policies. Sylacauga City Schools has been accredited by the Southern Association of Colleges and Schools (SACS) for many years.

The first school to be accredited was Sylacauga High School (SHS) in 1947, with Nichols-Lawson Middle School (as East Highland) in 1954, and Indian Valley and Pinecrest Elementary accredited in 1973. The combined instructional administration in SCS has 146 years as administrators, with 360 total years' experience in education and 274 years of experience in SCS. As of 2022, the total enrollment is 2,024 students, with almost half of those students transported to and from school by buses using 15 different routes. Sylacauga City Schools employs 273 people and contracts with additional personnel as needed.

Today four schools that make up the City of Sylacauga school system. Indian Valley Elementary is a fully independent facility that educates K-2. Pinecrest Elementary is a fully independent facility that educates grades 3–5. Nichols-Lawson Middle is a fully independent facility that educates grades 6–8. Sylacauga High is a fully independent, state-of-the-art facility that educates grades 9-12.

== Infrastructure ==
=== Transportation ===
Sylacauga lies on State Highway 21, which provides connections to U.S. Highways 280 and 231. Three major railroads serve the city—Norfolk Southern, CSX, and the Eastern Alabama Railway—along with eight major motor freight carriers, two of which maintain local terminals. Lee Merkle Field is the local airport. The city also has public transportation via buses.

=== Airport ===
Sylacauga Municipal Airport (FAA LID: SCD), also known as Lee Merkel Field, is a city-owned public-use airport located west of the central business district of Sylacauga. It is the closest air transportation connection to southeast Birmingham and north Shelby County. The airport has a 5,400-foot (1,600 m) runway with GPS approaches to LPV minimums. In 2020 the runway was resurfaced and new LED lighting was installed on the runway and taxiway areas. In 2025 the taxiway was resurfaced and re striped to make runway access easier. In 2020 the Alabama Department of Transportation Aeronautics Bureau completed a study of the annual economic impacts generated by Alabama's public airports. The Sylacauga Airport hosted 1,456 new visitors, brought in over 4.1 million dollars of economic activity and $689,800 in capital and aviation spending attributing to the 4.9 billion dollars spent statewide. The Sylacauga Airport has a maintenance facility supports flight schools, and is home to Life Saver 4, a medical helicopter owned and operated by the Air Methods group. The Airport is managed by the Sylacauga Airport Authority.

== Notable people ==
- Jerry Carl, Representative for Alabama's 1st district; member of the Mobile County Commission
- Peter Chartier (1690 – c. 1759), Shawnee chief who, in 1748, settled with his Shawnee band at site of the present town
- Drama, rapper
- Mickell Gladness, professional basketball player
- T. J. Green, NFL football player for Atlanta Falcons
- Jon Hand, football player for University of Alabama and NFL's Indianapolis Colts
- Ann Elizabeth Fowler Hodges, first documented individual to be struck by a meteorite
- Polly Holliday, actress, grew up in Childersburg and Sylacauga
- Dameian Jeffries, NFL football player for New Orleans Saints
- Marcus Knight, NFL football player for Oakland Raiders and Tampa Bay Buccaneers
- Cecil Leonard, football player
- Jim Nabors (1930–2017), actor and singer, Gomer Pyle, U.S.M.C.
- William Flynt Nichols, former U.S. congressman
- Anthony Parker, NFL football player for Tampa Bay Buccaneers
- Van Allen Plexico, writer
- Ricky Porter, NFL football player for Buffalo Bills and Indianapolis Colts
- F. Richard Spencer, Roman Catholic bishop
- James M. Sprayberry, recipient of the Medal of Honor for actions during the Vietnam War
- Billy Todd, bass singer for the Southern Gospel group, the Florida Boys
- Gerald Wallace, NBA basketball player for Boston Celtics
- Ehren Wassermann, MLB player
- Zelous Wheeler, baseball player
