= Sylacauga City Schools =

School district in Alabama

Location
- Sylacauga, Alabama United States

District information
- Type: Public
- Motto: 'College Career Community'
- Grades: PK-12
- Superintendent: Dr. Michele Eller
- Schools: 4
- Budget: $23.5 million
- NCES District ID: 0103120

Students and staff
- Students: 2184
- Teachers: 131
- Staff: 117

Other information
- Website: http://www.scsboe.org/

The Sylacauga City Schools (SCS) is the school district of Sylacauga, Alabama. Sylacauga City Schools serve 2,184 students and employ 248 faculty and staff. The district includes two elementary schools, one middle school, and one high school.

== History ==
The first school to be accredited was Sylacauga High School in 1947, with Nichols Lawson Middle School (as East Highland) in 1954, and Indian Valley and Pinecrest accredited in 1973. The combined instructional administration in SCS has 146 years as administrators, with 360 total years' experience in education and 274 years' of experience in SCS. The total enrollment is 2,184 students, with almost half of those students transported to and from school by buses using 15 different routes. Sylacauga City Schools employs 248 people and contracts with additional personnel as needed.

== Schools ==
The Sylacauga City School District consists of four schools:

- Indian Valley Elementary School (PK-2)
- Pinecrest Elementary School (3–5)
- Nichols Lawson Middle School (6–8)
- Sylacauga High School (9–12)

== Governance ==
The school system is governed by a five-member board of education, whose members are appointed by the City Council of Sylacauga for staggered five-year terms. Amy Price (President), Janean Crawford (vice-president), Dr. Rekha Chadalawada, Melissa Garris, and Dr. Steven Marlowe serve staggered 5-year contracts. The day-to-day operation of the school system is entrusted to the Superintendent of Schools, Dr. Jon Segars, who is appointed by the Board of Education.
