= Bemis Company =

American materials company

Bemis Company, Inc.
- Type: Public
- Traded as: NYSE: BMS S&P 500 component (June 7-11, 2019)
- Industry: Packaging
- Founded: 1858; 168 years ago
- Founder: Judson Moss Bemis
- Defunct: June 11, 2019
- Fate: Acquired by and merged into Amcor
- Headquarters: Neenah, Wisconsin, U.S.
- Key people: William F. Austen, President and CEO; Michael B. Clauer, Vice President and CFO
- Revenue: ▲$5.3B(FY 2011)
- Operating income: ▲US$367M (FY 2011)
- Net income: ▲US$184M (FY 2011)
- Total assets: ▲US$4.32B (FY 2011)
- Total equity: ▲US$1.58B (FY 2011)
- Number of employees: 16,582 (2017)
- Website: www.bemis.com

Bemis Company, Inc. was a global manufacturer of flexible packaging products (ranging from self-venting cook-in-bag packaging and retort packaging for shelf-stable products, to vacuum packaging for meat products and puncture-resistant, sterile medical packaging) and pressure-sensitive materials. Bemis was headquartered in Neenah, Wisconsin in the United States. Its divisions were located in 12 countries and its films for packaging products and adhesive materials were distributed worldwide.

In August 2018, Amcor announced it would acquire the company for $5.25 billion in shares. The deal completed on June 11, 2019, and all operations have been merged with Amcor.

== History ==
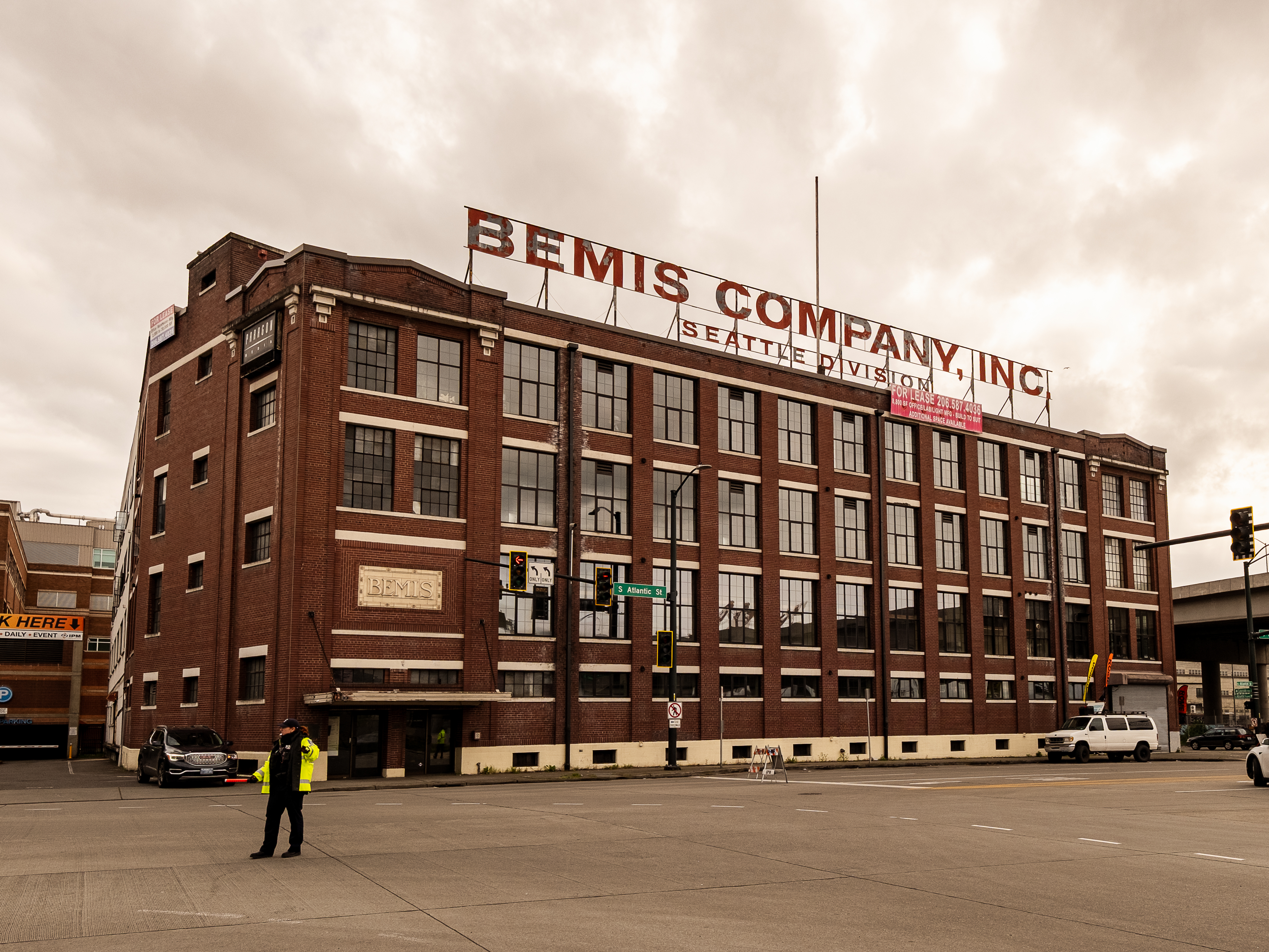
Bemis Company building in Seattle, Washington.

Bemis Brothers Bag Company was founded by Judson Moss Bemis in 1858 in St. Louis, Missouri, as a manufacturer of printed cotton bags for food products. Its first location was on the second floor of a machine shop, which provided steam to operate the printing presses and readily available maintenance personnel for machine repairs.

Two key innovations Bemis' company originally pioneered were the printing and machine-sewing of bags. (Traditionally, bags were stenciled and hand-sewn.) Bemis' first order was for 200 half-barrel sacks. To allay worries that machine-sewn bags were inferior to traditional hand-sewn bags, Judson Bemis unconditionally guaranteed every bag his company manufactured.

In 1867, Judson Bemis' brother, Stephen A. Bemis, returned from the gold rush and joined Judson in the bag manufacturing business. Bemis Bro. Bag Co. opened its second plant in 1880 in Minneapolis, followed by a third in Omaha, Nebraska, in 1888. These plants were followed by others in New Orleans, Superior (WI), San Francisco, Indianapolis, Memphis, Kansas City, Seattle, Wichita and Winnipeg. In the early 1900s, Bemis opened its first paper bag manufacturing plant.

On July 25, 2003, Bemis Company, Inc. and UPM-Kymmene (Nasdaq Helsinki: UPM) agreed to terminate their agreement to sell Bemis' Pressure Sensitive Materials Business to UPM-Kymmene. On April 15, 2003, the Department of Justice was granted an injunction to block the transaction.

In 2011, the company had net sales of $5.3 billion, operating 78 facilities in 12 countries. Over two-thirds of Bemis packaging is used in the food industry, with the balance used in markets including medical, pharmaceutical, chemical, and agribusiness. Bemis' pressure-sensitive products are used in industries including graphic arts, digital imaging, assembly engineering, communications and medical. In July 2012 Bemis company announced a strategic partnership with Norwegian printed electronics company Thin Film Electronics ASA to bring printed electronics to existing Bemis packaging lines. In 2013 the company acquired a China-based film platform. In 2014, Bemis sold its Paper Packaging Division to Hood Packaging Corporation.

== Mascot ==
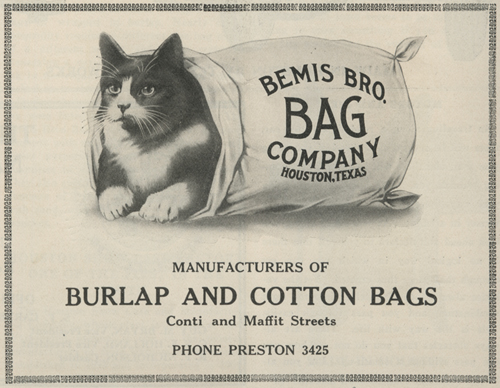
Biddy the cat logo

The mascot for Bemis Brothers Bag Company was a cat named Biddy. The logo printed on their bags was drawn from a cat (and "excellent mouser") in their first factory. Judson viewed the logo as communicating that Bemis would deal fairly with its customers by "letting the cat out of the bag". Several sculptures of Biddy were displayed at their second branch in Omaha.

Variations on the logo included Biddy with four kittens (symbolizing the company's four factories), Biddy playing bagpipes in Minneapolis, Biddy playing baseball in Omaha, and Biddy with an umbrella in Seattle. The mascot was retired in 1962.

== See also ==
- Bemis Omaha Bag Company Building
- Bemis, Tennessee
- Bemiston, Alabama
