= Sylacauga Municipal Airport =

Airport in Alabama, United States

Sylacauga Municipal Airport Merkel Field
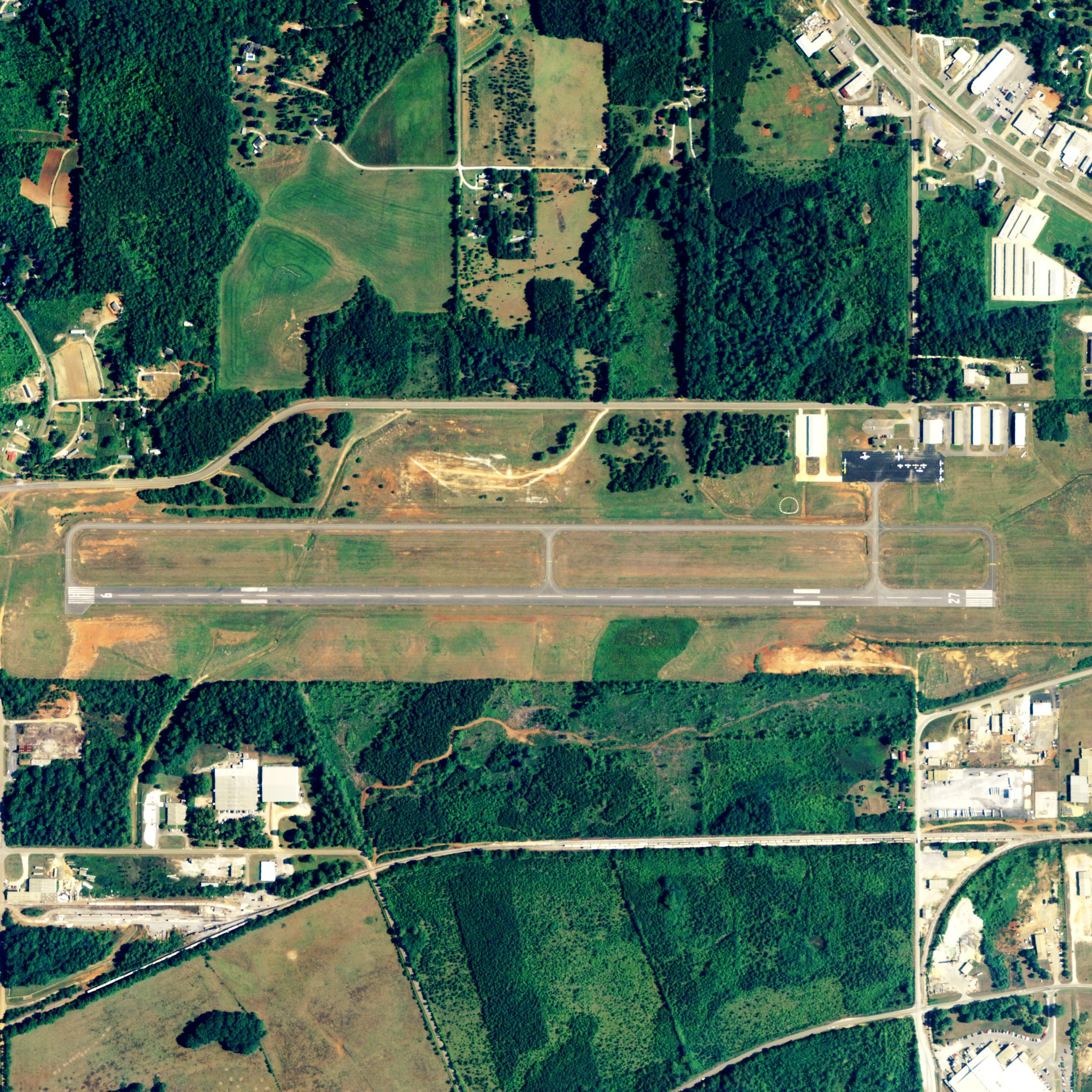
- NAIP Aerial Image, 2006
- IATA: none; ICAO: KSCD; FAA LID: SCD

Summary
- Airport type: Public
- Owner: City of Sylacauga
- Operator: Sylacauga Airport Authority
- Serves: Sylacauga, Alabama
- Elevation AMSL: 569 ft / 173 m
- Coordinates: 33°10′19″N 086°18′20″W
- Website: FlyKSCD.com
- Interactive map of Sylacauga Municipal Airport

Runways
Direction	Length		Surface
Direction	ft	m	Surface
9/27	5,390	1,643	Asphalt

Statistics (2010)
- Aircraft operations: 28,316
- Based aircraft: 63
- Source: Federal Aviation Administration

Sylacauga Municipal Airport (ICAO: KSCD, FAA LID: SCD), also known as Merkel Field, is a city-owned public-use airport located three nautical miles (3.5 mi; 5.6 km) west of the central business district of Sylacauga, a city in Talladega County, Alabama, United States. It is included in the FAA's National Plan of Integrated Airport Systems for 2011–2015, which categorized it as a general aviation facility.

Although most U.S. airports use the same three-letter location identifier for the FAA and IATA, this airport is assigned SCD by the FAA but has no designation from the IATA (which assigned SCD to Sulaco, Honduras).

== Facilities and aircraft ==
Sylacauga Municipal Airport covers an area of 243 acres (98 ha) at an elevation of 569 feet (173 m) above mean sea level. It has one runway designated 9/27 with an asphalt surface measuring 5,390 by 100 feet (1,643 by 30 m).

For the 12-month period ending December 15, 2010, the airport had 28,316 aircraft operations, an average of 77 per day: 99% general aviation and 1% military. At that time there were 63 aircraft based at this airport: 79% single-engine, 9% multi-engine, 5% helicopter, 5% glider and 2% ultralight.

== See also ==
- List of airports in Alabama
