= F. Richard Spencer =

American Roman Catholic bishop (born 1951)

His Excellency, The Most Reverend Frank Richard Spencer
- Auxiliary Bishop emeritus for the Military Services, USA; Titular bishop of Auzia
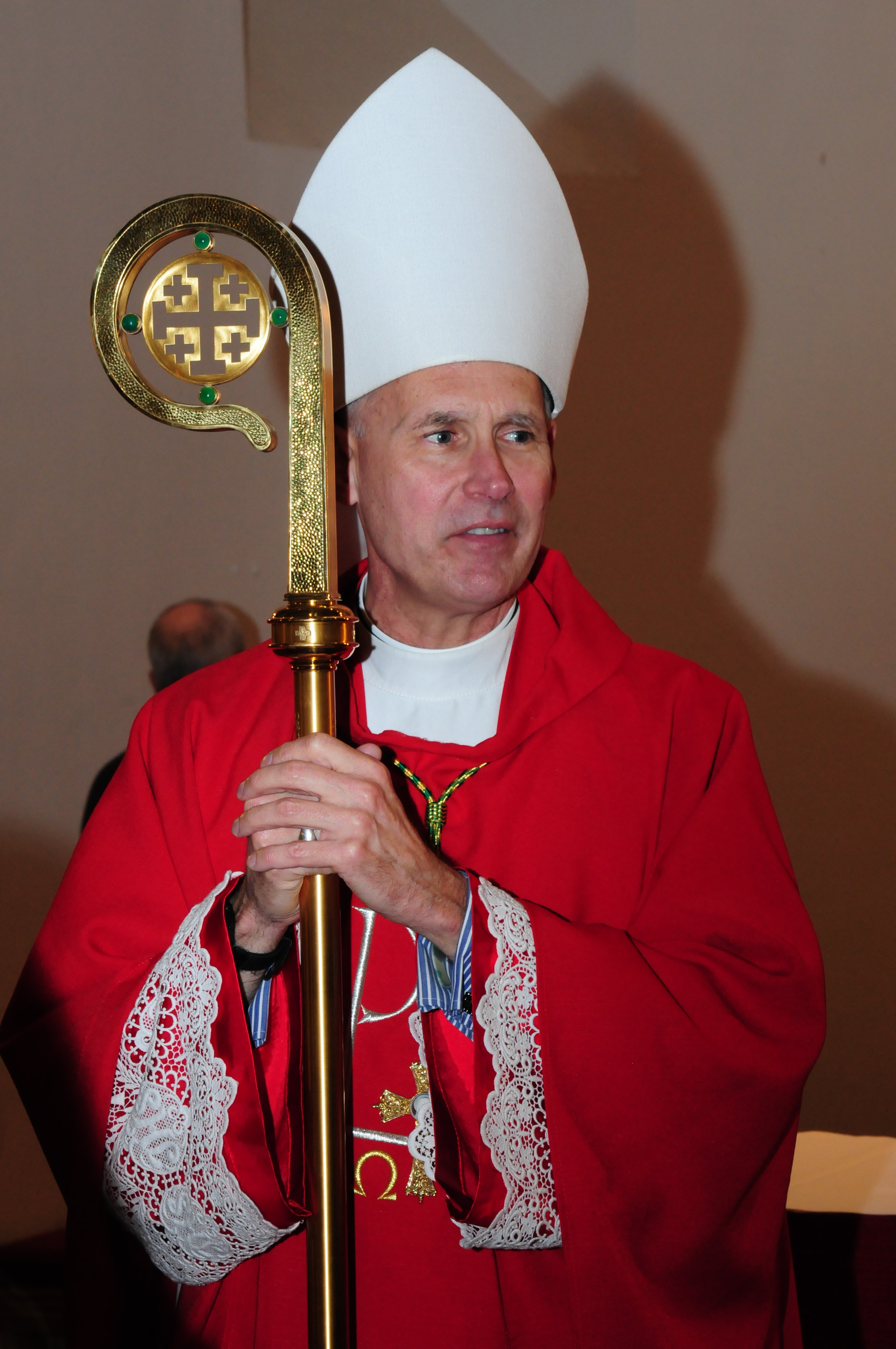
- Bishop Spencer, 2012
- Archdiocese: Military Services, USA
- Appointed: May 22, 2010
- Installed: September 8, 2010
- Retired: June 10, 2026
- Other posts: Titular bishop of Auzia; Vicar, Military Chapels and US Embassies in Europe and Asia

Orders
- Ordination: May 14, 1988 by William Donald Borders
- Consecration: September 8, 2010 by Timothy Broglio, Donald Wuerl, and Edwin Frederick O'Brien

Personal details
- Born: June 10, 1951 (age 75) Sylacauga, Alabama, US
- Education: Jacksonville State University; University of Wisconsin–La Crosse; St. Mary's Seminary; National War College
- Motto: Auscultabo ut serviam (I will listen, that I may serve)

Styles of Frank Richard Spencer
- Reference style: His Excellency; The Most Reverend
- Spoken style: Your Excellency
- Religious style: Bishop

Frank Richard Spencer (born June 10, 1951) is a retired American Catholic prelate who served as an auxiliary bishop for the Archdiocese for the Military Services from 2010 to June 2026. He was the vicar for military chapels (and U.S. State Department embassies) in Europe and in Asia.

== Biography ==
=== Early life ===
Frank Spencer was born on June 10, 1951, in Sylacauga, Alabama. He graduated from Sylacauga High School in 1969. He was an altar boy and earned the rank of Eagle Scout. Spencer then attended Jacksonville State University in Jacksonville, Alabama, where he earned a Bachelor of Science in law enforcement. He also received a Master of Education in counseling from the University of Wisconsin–La Crosse in La Crosse, Wisconsin Spencer earned a Master of Divinity and a Bachelor of Sacred Theology from St. Mary's Seminary in Baltimore, Maryland, and two honorary Doctor of Letters degrees.

=== Military service ===
Spencer was commissioned an officer in the US Army in 1973 and began serving active duty in 1974. Following Military Police Officer Basic Course and Advanced training, he was assigned as the first active duty provost marshal since 1954 to Fort McCoy, Wisconsin. He served as commander of the Military Police Detachment at Fort McCoy until summer 1977, when he was assigned to serve with the 2nd Infantry Division at Camp Casey in South Korea.

Spencer's military education includes: Military Police Officer Basic and Advanced Courses, Chaplain Officer Basic and Advanced Courses, Command and General Staff Officer Course and Clinical Pastoral Education at Walter Reed Army Medical Center in Washington, DC. He was selected to attend the Resident National War College in Washington, Class of 2010.

Inspired by the actions of Captain Chaplain Emil Kapaun, who died as a prisoner of war during the Korean War, Spencer requested release from active duty in 1978 to pursue his studies for the priesthood. He initially studied under the Order of Friars Minor of the Holy Name Province, but was later recruited for the Archdiocese of Baltimore by Archbishop William Borders.

Spencer served in South Korea, Bosnia, Egypt and at the Pentagon during the September 11, 2001, attacks and Germany in capacities to include brigade and division positions. He deployed into Iraq on five occasions and also served two deployments in Afghanistan. Spencer retired from the military as a chaplain, colonel, in February 2014.

=== Ordination and ministry ===
On May 14, 1988, Spencer was ordained a priest by Archbishop Borders at the Cathedral of Mary Our Queen in Baltimore. After his ordination, Spencer was appointed as an associate pastor at Sacred Heart Parish in Glyndon, Maryland, for three years. In 1991, he was named director of the Monsignor Clare J. O'Dwyer Retreat House in Sparks, Maryland. Spencer also accessioned again into the US Army Reserve as a battalion chaplain, serving with the 92nd Field Hospital in Baltimore and the Aviation Brigade of the Maryland Army National Guard. Following his completion of the Chaplain Officer Advanced Course in 1994, Spencer served a deployment in Europe in support of US operations in Bosnia as a National Guardsman. From 1994 to 1998, he served administrator of St. Peter the Apostle Parish in Oakland, Maryland.

Spencer returned to active duty ministry in January 1999, and served as the 2nd Engineer Brigade chaplain at Camp Howze in South Korea. In 2000, he served a US deployment in Egypt, supporting the Fort Bragg mission in the Sinai Peninsula. From 2001 to 2005, he was an official of the Pentagon Office of Army Chief Chaplains, and served a deployment tour in Iraq with the 1st Cavalry Division. In the summer of 2005, Spencer began a one-year program as a student of Clinical Pastoral Education at Walter Reed Army Medical Center He was promoted to lieutenant colonel in 2005, and was appointed an episcopal vicar for the Archdiocese for the Military Services in 2006.

In the summer of 2006, Spencer was assigned to serve as the senior clinician at the 121st Combat Support Hospital, the deputy 18th MEDCOM command chaplain, and the Catholic pastor of Yongson in Seoul. In June 2008, he was appointed to serve as the division chaplain of the Second Infantry Division in Korea, and served as a deputy command chaplain of the U.S. Army Europe for operations, plans and training.

=== Auxiliary bishop for the Military Services ===
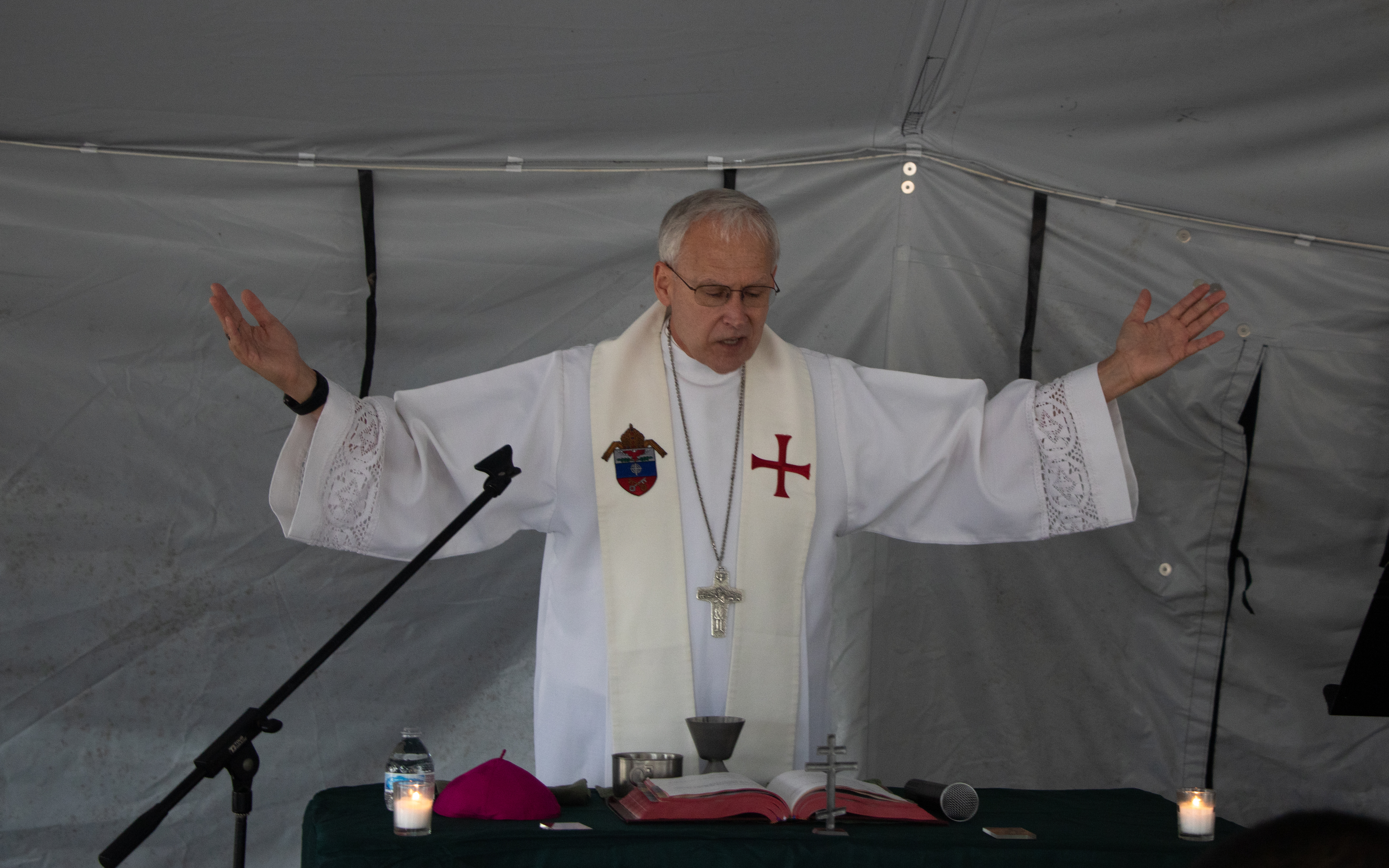
Bishop Spencer presiding at a field Mass

On May 22, 2010, Spencer was appointed as an auxiliary bishop of the Archdiocese for the Military Services and titular bishop of Auzia by Pope Benedict XVI. His episcopal consecration by Archbishop Timothy Broglio took place on September 8, 2010, in the Basilica of the National Shrine of the Immaculate Conception in Washington, D.C.

Upon reaching the mandated retirement age of 75 for bishops, Pope Leo XIV accepted his resignation as auxiliary bishop on June 10, 2026.

== Awards and honors ==
Spencer's awards include:

- Legion of Merit
- Meritorious Service Medal (3 Oak Leaf Clusters)
- Army Commendation Medal (6 Oak Leaf Clusters)
- Iraq Campaign Medal
- Korean Defense Service Medal
- Combat Action Badge for combat action in Iraq in 2004

His fraternal activities include a papal honor as a knight of the Holy Sepulchre and also a member of Kappa Sigma fraternity. He has been recognized with the National Eagle Scout Association's Outstanding Eagle Scout Award.

== Family ==
Spencer's family includes his younger brother, Father Robert Spencer, retired Commander, U.S. Navy Chaplain; Jim Spencer (a Methodist minister), Bill Spencer and sister, Peggy Spencer Fetyko.

== See also ==
- Catholic Church hierarchy
- Catholic Church in the United States
- Chaplain Corps (United States Army)
- Historical list of the Catholic bishops of the United States
- Insignia of chaplain schools in the United States military
- List of Catholic bishops of the United States
- List of Catholic bishops of the United States: military service
- Lists of patriarchs, archbishops, and bishops
- Military chaplain
- Religious symbolism in the United States military
- United States military chaplains

== Episcopal succession ==
Catholic Church titles
Preceded by –	Auxiliary Bishop for the Military Services, USA; 2010 - Present	Succeeded by –
