= Anniston and Atlantic Railroad =

Overview
- Headquarters: Anniston, Alabama
- Locale: North-eastern Alabama
- Dates of operation: 1884–1890

Technical
- Track gauge: 3 ft (914 mm)

The Anniston and Atlantic Railroad was a 53-mile 3 ft (914 mm) narrow-gauge railroad built between Anniston and Sylacauga, Alabama via Talladega and Murphy.

It was founded by A.L. Tyler of Anniston, who obtained a charter on August 17, 1883, and opened the 30-mile stretch between Anniston and Talladega on May 15, 1884. An extension to Sycamore, Alabama, was opened on September 15, 1884, and to Sylacauga, Alabama, on December 1, 1886. The line was built to haul timber, charcoal and iron ore to Anniston, where it could be transferred to the standard-gauge Southern Railway.

The Louisville and Nashville Railroad purchased the line in 1890 along with the associated standard-gauge Anniston and Cincinnati Railroad. To this, the L&N added the Shelby Iron Company's railroad to create the Alabama Mineral Railroad. The A&A's narrow-gauge track was converted to standard gauge later that year. Much of the right-of-way still exists as part of the CSX Corporation's trackage in the area.
