= Bemiston, Alabama =

- Unincorporated community
- Location within Alabama Location within the United States
- Coordinates: 33°24′36″N 86°07′15″W
- Country: United States
- State: Alabama
- County: Talladega
- Elevation: 561 ft (171 m)
- Time zone: UTC-6 (Central (CST))
  - Summer (DST): UTC-5 (CDT)
- Area codes: 256 & 938
- GNIS feature ID: 159147

Bemiston Mill Village
- Location within Alabama
- Location: Talladega, Alabama

History
- Founded: 1927

Alabama Register of Landmarks and Heritage
- Official name: Bemiston Mill Village
- Designated: December 1, 2008

Bemiston is an unincorporated community and former company town in Talladega County, Alabama, United States. Bemiston now lies within the city limits of Talladega.

== History ==
Bemiston was founded in 1927, as a mill town built around the Bemis Brothers Bag Company cotton mill. The mill was built between Alabama State Route 21 and the Eastern Alabama Railway. The 700,000-square-foot mill produced handbags during the Great Depression and sandbags during World War II. The community was home to a school, general store, automobile repair shop, nurses' office, and gymnasium. The company built a power plant and sewer and water treatment plant to serve the community. A recreational director was hired to develop a community baseball and basketball team. The workers' houses were made of California Redwood, with two-car garages and running hot and cold water. A community dairy farm was started by the company with 68 Holstein cattle to provide milk to the residents. Bemis closed the mill in 1979, but the factory was acquired by Master Brand Industries, a cabinet maker. The community has since been listed on the Alabama Register of Landmarks and Heritage.

== Demographics ==
Historical population
Census	Pop.	Note	%±
1950	1,007		—
U.S. Decennial Census

Bemiston appeared on the 1950 U.S. Census as an unincorporated community prior to its annexation into Talladega in 1955.
