= General Forney =

General Forney may refer to:

- Edward H. Forney (1909–1965), U.S. Marine Corps brigadier general
- James Forney (1844–1921), U.S. Marine Corps brigadier general in the American Civil War
- John Horace Forney (1829–1902), Confederate States Army major general
- William H. Forney (1823–1894), Confederate States Army brigadier general
