= John Abercrombie (politician) =

American politician (1866–1940)

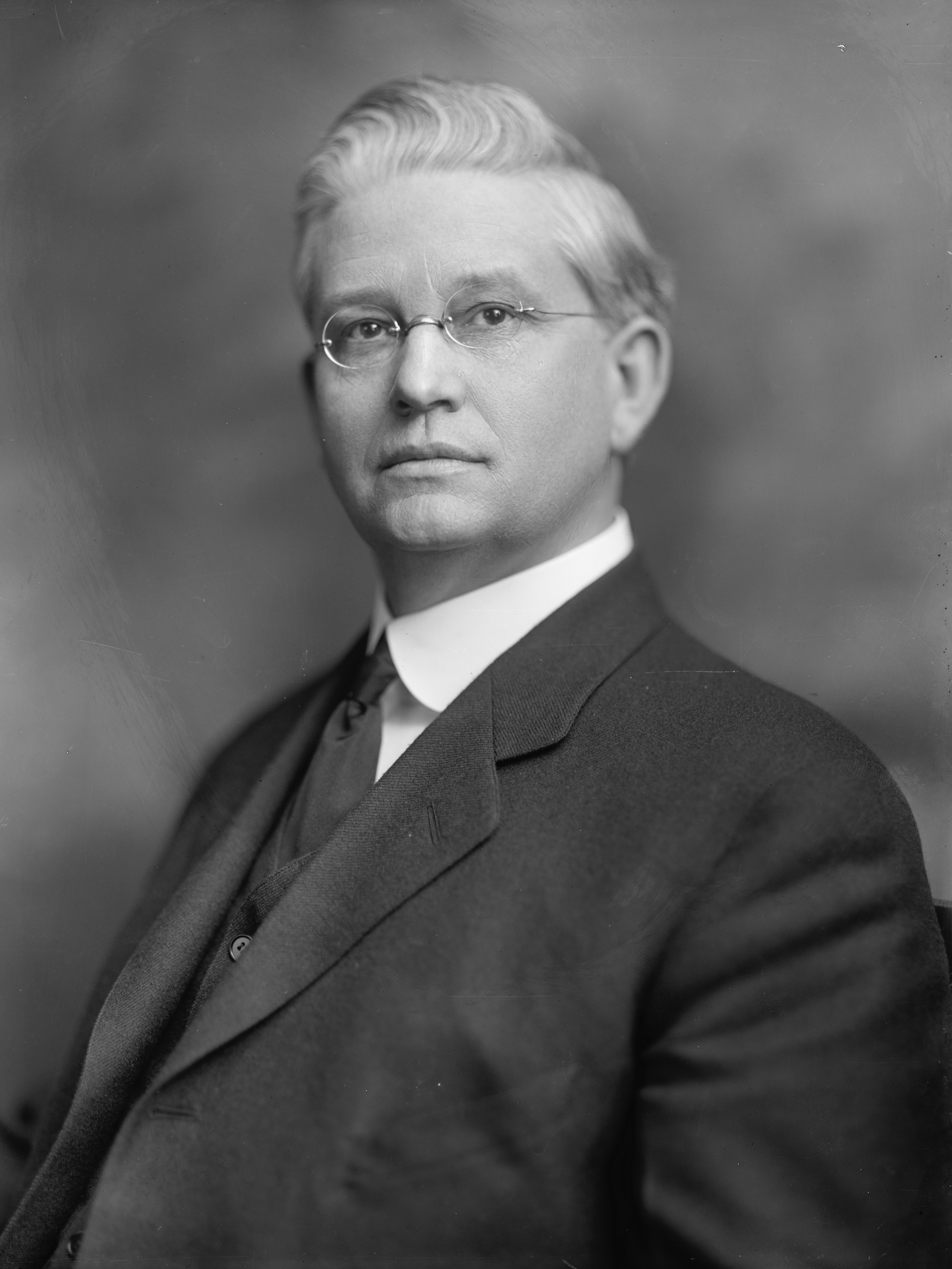
- Portrait of Abercrombie

Member of the U.S. House of Representatives from Alabama's at-large district
- In office March 4, 1913 – March 3, 1917
- Preceded by: William H. Forney; Burwell Boykin Lewis (1877)
- Succeeded by: Albert Rains; George M. Grant (1963)

Member of the Alabama Senate
- In office 1896-1898

Personal details
- Born: John William Abercrombie; May 17, 1866 St. Clair County, Alabama, US
- Died: July 2, 1940 (aged 74) Montgomery, Alabama, US
- Resting place: Greenwood Cemetery
- Party: Democratic Party
- Spouse: Rose Merrill Abercrombie
- Education: Oxford College, University of Alabama
- Profession: Attorney, politician, college president

John William Abercrombie (May 17, 1866 – July 2, 1940) was an American lawyer, education leader, and politician who served as both the President of the University of Alabama and as a member of the United States House of Representatives from Alabama.

== Biography ==
Abercrombie was born in St. Clair County, Alabama, near Kellys Creek Post Office, in 1866. He was the son of Henry M. and Sarah A. (Kendrick) Abercrombie. He attended rural schools, and ultimately graduated from Oxford College, located in Oxford, Alabama, in 1886. He went on to receive a degree in law from the University of Alabama in 1888. He was admitted to the bar that same year.

On January 8, 1891, he married Rosa Merrill.

== Career ==
Abercrombie practiced in Cleburne County, Alabama through 1890. He also served as a high school principal, city school superintendent, and college president from 1888 through 1898.

Elected to the Alabama Senate, Abercrombie served from 1896 through 1898. He then served the state as the state superintendent of education from 1898 to 1902. In 1902 he was made the President of the University of Alabama and he served in that capacity until 1911.

=== Congress ===
In 1912, Abercrombie was elected from the Democratic Party to the United States House of Representatives, where he served from March 4, 1913, to March 3, 1917.

=== Later career ===
He went on to serve as Solicitor of Labor and Acting Secretary in the United States Department of Labor from 1918 through 1920. In 1920, he was again elected the Superintendent of Education in Alabama, where he served until 1927.

== Death ==
Abercrombie resided in Montgomery, Alabama, where he died on July 2, 1940 (age 74 years, 46 days). He is interred at Greenwood Cemetery, Montgomery, Alabama.

== Affiliations ==
He was a Freemason and a member of Scottish Rite, as well as the Kappa Alpha Order (collegiate social fraternity); Phi Beta Kappa (collegiate honor society); Knights of Pythias; Woodmen; and Kiwanis.

U.S. House of Representatives
Preceded by William H. Forney; Burwell Boykin Lewis (1877)	Member of the U.S. House of Representatives from Alabama's at-large congressional district March 4, 1913 – March 3, 1917	Succeeded by Albert Rains; George M. Grant (1963)
