= 1st Kentucky Infantry Regiment =

1st Kentucky Infantry Regiment may refer to:

- 1st Kentucky Infantry Regiment (Confederate), a regiment in the Confederate States Army
- 1st Kentucky Infantry Regiment (Union), a regiment in the Union Army

== See also ==
- 1st Kentucky Cavalry Regiment (disambiguation)
- 1st Kentucky Artillery
