= Goldsmith W. Hewitt =

American politician (1834–1895)

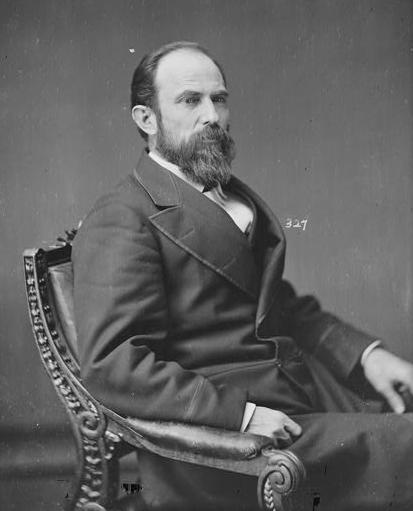

Member of the U.S. House of Representatives from Alabama's 6th district
- In office March 4, 1881 – March 3, 1885
- Preceded by: Newton Nash Clements
- Succeeded by: John Mason Martin

Member of the U.S. House of Representatives from Alabama's 6th district
- In office March 4, 1875 – March 3, 1879
- Preceded by: Joseph Humphrey Sloss
- Succeeded by: Burwell Boykin Lewis

Member of the Alabama Senate
- In office 1872-1874

Member of the Alabama House of Representatives
- In office 1870-1871; 1886-1888

Personal details
- Born: Goldsmith Whitehouse Hewitt; February 14, 1834 Elyton, Alabama, US
- Died: May 27, 1895 (aged 61) Birmingham, Alabama, US
- Party: Democratic
- Spouse: Harriet Earle

Goldsmith Whitehouse Hewitt (February 14, 1834 – May 27, 1895) was a U.S. representative from Alabama.

== Biography ==
Born near Elyton (now Birmingham), Jefferson County, Alabama, Hewitt attended the country schools. Entered the Confederate States Army in June 1861 as a private in Company B, 10th Regiment Alabama Infantry. Promoted to captain of Company G, Twenty-eighth Regiment, Alabama Infantry, in 1862. Graduated from Cumberland School of Law at Cumberland University, Lebanon, Tennessee, in 1866. Admitted to the bar the same year and commenced practice in Birmingham, Alabama.

Hewitt served as member of the State house of representatives in 1870 and 1871, and as a member of the State senate from 1872 to 1874, resigning in the latter year. Elected as a Democrat to the Forty-fourth and Forty-fifth Congresses (March 4, 1875 – March 3, 1879). Elected to the Forty-seventh and Forty-eighth Congresses (March 4, 1881 – March 3, 1885). Served as chairman of the Committee on Pensions (Forty-eighth Congress). He was not a candidate for renomination in 1884.

Hewitt resumed the practice of law and again served as member of the State house of representatives in 1886–1888. He died in Birmingham, Alabama, on May 27, 1895, and was interred in Oak Hill Cemetery.

== Bibliography ==
- United States Congress. "Goldsmith W. Hewitt (id: H000553)". Biographical Directory of the United States Congress. Retrieved on 2009-5-12

U.S. House of Representatives
Preceded by Joseph H. Sloss	Member of the U.S. House of Representatives from Alabama's 6th congressional district 1875-1879	Succeeded by Burwell B. Lewis
Preceded by Newton N. Clements	Member of the U.S. House of Representatives from Alabama's 6th congressional district 1881-1885	Succeeded by John M. Martin
