= Martin Hardin =

Martin Hardin may refer to:

- Martin D. Hardin (1780-1823), United States senator from Kentucky
- Martin Davis Hardin (1837–1923), brigadier general in the Union Army during the American Civil War; grandson of the U.S. senator
