= Newton Nash Clements =

American politician

Member of the U.S. House of Representatives from Alabama's 6th district
- In office December 8, 1880 – March 3, 1881
- Preceded by: Burwell Boykin Lewis
- Succeeded by: Goldsmith W. Hewitt

Member of the Alabama House of Representatives
- In office 1870-1872, 1874-1878, 1886-1896

Personal details
- Born: Newton Nash Clements; December 23, 1837 Elyton, Alabama, US
- Died: February 20, 1900 (aged 62) Birmingham, Alabama, US
- Party: Democratic
- Spouse: Laura Garnett McMichael
- Education: University of Alabama at Tuscaloosa

Military service
- Allegiance: Confederate States of America
- Branch/service: Confederate States Army
- Years of service: 1861–1865
- Rank: Colonel
- Unit: 50th Alabama Infantry Regiment
- Battles/wars: American Civil War

Newton Nash Clements (December 23, 1837 – February 20, 1900) was a Colonel in the Confederate States Army and U.S. Representative from Alabama.

== Biography ==
Born in Tuscaloosa County, Alabama, to Hardy Clements and Maria Pegues Clements, Clements was graduated from the University of Alabama at Tuscaloosa in 1858. During his time at the university, he was the first recipient of an offer for membership and, to give him time to consider the invitation, was initiated the following week, making Clements the first non-founder admitted into the Sigma Alpha Epsilon Fraternity. Clements entered Harvard University in 1859 and studied law but never practiced.

During the Civil War, Clements entered the Confederate States Army as a captain in the 26th Alabama Infantry Regiment, later redesignated as the 50th Alabama Infantry Regiment. He was successively promoted to the ranks of major, lieutenant colonel, and colonel.

He served as member of the Alabama House of Representatives from 1870 to 1872 and 1874 to 1878, serving as speaker in the years, 1876, 1877, and 1878. Clements was elected as a Democrat to the Forty-sixth Congress to fill the vacancy caused by the resignation of Burwell B. Lewis and served from December 8, 1880, to March 3, 1881. He was an unsuccessful candidate for re-nomination in 1880. Clements was re-elected to the Alabama House in 1886, 1888, and 1890, and was again named speaker until 1896.

Clements was largely interested in planting and cotton manufactures. He died in Tuscaloosa, Alabama, February 20, 1900 was interred at Evergreen Cemetery.

== Notes ==
U.S. House of Representatives
Preceded by Burwell B. Lewis	Member of the U.S. House of Representatives from Alabama's 6th congressional district 1880–1881	Succeeded by Goldsmith W. Hewitt
