= Grove Oak, Alabama =

Unincorporated community in Alabama, United States

- Unincorporated community
- Location within Alabama
- Coordinates: 34°26′17″N 086°03′09″W
- Country: United States
- State: Alabama
- County: DeKalb
- Elevation: 1,175 ft (358 m)
- GNIS ID: 150268

Grove Oak is a small unincorporated community in DeKalb County, Alabama, United States. It is located atop Sand Mountain in northeastern Alabama.

Grove Oak has one store, and is surrounded by forests and farmland. There are two Baptist churches. There is a small Masonic lodge and a now-closed junior high school. It also has a restaurant that has been in and out of business several times.

Until about the mid-1970s, it was the center of a farming community and had its own cotton gin. Today, farming is not so much the focus, and most working members of the Grove Oak community drive to factories or other jobs in the larger towns nearby. Limited farming, cattle, and poultry raising takes place in and around the town.

== Geography ==
Grove Oak is located at 34°26′17″N 086°03′09″W. Its average elevation is 1,175 feet (358 m) above sea level.

== Notable person ==
- Albert Rains, U.S. Representative from 1945 to 1965
