= Elizabeth Johnston Evans Johnston =

American philanthropist, social worker; Alabama Women's Hall of Fame (1851–1934)

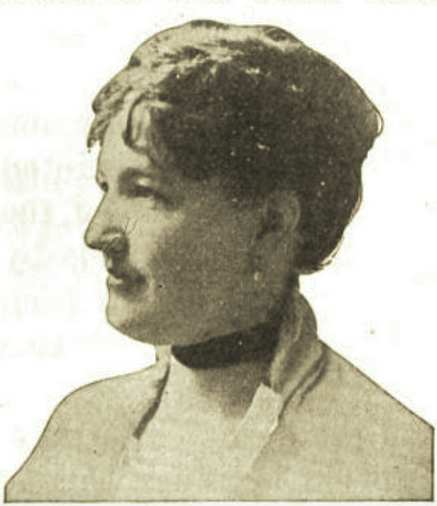
- Born: Elizabeth Johnston Evans; May 3, 1851; Greensboro, North Carolina, U.S.
- Died: December 20, 1934 (aged 83); Birmingham, Alabama, U.S.
- Resting place: Elmwood Cemetery, Birmingham
- Monuments: Guilford Courthouse National Military Park
- Other names: "Johnsie"; "Lizzie"
- Education: Charlotte Female College
- Occupations: philanthropist; social worker; clubwoman
- Organization(s): Vice-regent, Mount Vernon Ladies' Association
- Board member of: President, Alabama boys industrial school
- Spouse: Robert Daniel Johnston (m. 1871; died 1919)
- Children: 9, including Gordon Johnston
- Relatives: John Motley Morehead
- Awards: Alabama Women's Hall of Fame

Elizabeth Johnston Evans Johnston (May 3, 1851 – December 20, 1934) was an American philanthropist, social worker, and clubwoman. She served as president of the board of control of the Alabama boys industrial school, and was the vice-regent of the Mount Vernon Ladies' Association from Alabama. In 1981, Johnston was inducted into the Alabama Women's Hall of Fame.

== Early life and education ==
Elizabeth Johnston (nicknames, "Johnsie" or "Lizzie") Evans was born May 3, 1851, at Greensboro, North Carolina. Her parents were Peter Gustavus and Anne Eliza (Morehead) Evans, who lived at New Bern, North Carolina, captain of a volunteer company of cavalry, and afterwards colonel of the 63rd North Carolina cavalry regiment, Confederate States Army. She was a granddaughter of Peter and Nancy (Johnston) Evans, of Egypt, North Carolina, and of John Motley and Anne Eliza (Lindsay) Morehead, of Greensboro. She was descended from Juduthun Harper, who served in the Colonial congress and was an officer in the Revolutionary Army. Another forebear was Karenhappuck-Norman Turner, a noted war nurse who had seven sons in the Revolutionary Army, who rode horseback from her home in Maryland to Guilford, North Carolina, reaching there just after the Battle of Guilford Court House, and saved the life of Colonel Forbes and one of her own sons, and in recognition of her patriotic services throughout that period, a monument was erected to her memory on the Guilford battle grounds (now, Guilford Courthouse National Military Park. Johnston's siblings were: Smith (b. 1847), Evans (b. 1852), Evans (b. 1853), Louise (b. 1854), Evans (b. 1855), and the twins John and Peter (b. 1857).

Johnston was educated at the Charlotte Female College (now, Queens University of Charlotte), North Carolina.

== Career ==
After removing to Birmingham, Alabama in 1887, with her husband and children, she entered actively into the civic, educational and philanthropic activities of that city. Having presented the need for a reform school for delinquent boys to the Alabama Federation of Women’s Clubs, Johnston received the support of that body for legislative action, and was made chair of the legislative committee, authorized to press the passage of a law during the session of 1898–99, making an appropriation, giving a charter, and creating a board of control to be composed of seven women, the governor, attorney general, and secretary of agriculture. She achieved her plans, and when the board was organized in 1900, was elected its president and held that position for 34 years, until her death in 1934. The school was located at East Lake. This was the first State board in Alabama composed in the main of woman.

She served as vice-regent for the Mount Vernon Ladies' Association for a number of years. In that role, she secured and gave to the association a sword that belonged to General George Washington, which her sons presented in her name; a sofa that originally belonged at Mount Vernon; the sash upon which General Edward Braddock was carried from the battlefield, which he gave to his aide, Col. George Washington, and on which seven blood stains were visible; the gift of a bedspread that was made by a relative of Martha Washington; and the gift of the camp bedstead used by General Washington in his campaigns.

For more than 25 years, Johnston was the president of the Highland Book Club, an organization that she organized. For 15 years, she, in association with her husband and Julia Tutwiler, ministered to the spiritual welfare of the prisoners in and near Birmingham, teaching in prison Sunday schools, especially to the convicts who worked in the Pratt Coal Mine convict camp.

== Personal life ==
The greater part of her time, since 1915, was spent on her apple orchard, near Winchester, Virginia. She also had a summer residence in Port Dover, Ontario.

She was a Democrat and a Presbyterian.

On November 1, 1871, in Greensboro, North Carolina, she married Robert Daniel Johnston. Their children were: Louisa (b. 1872), Gordon (b. 1874), Robert Daniel Jr. (b. 1877), Nancy (b. 1881), Lizzie (b. 1883), Elizabeth (b. 1884), Evans (b. 1885), Eugenia (b. 1888), Ewart (b. 1889), Letitia (b. 1896), and Gerald.

In Holland's: The Magazine of the South (volume 50, February 1931), Mary Johnston Avery published a short biography, "Southern Personalities - Johnsie Evans Johnston".

== Death and legacy ==
Elizabeth Johnston Evans Johnston died at Birmingham, Alabama, December 20, 1934. Interment was at that city's Elmwood Cemetery.

Her papers are held at the George Washington Presidential Library at Mount Vernon.

== Awards and honors ==
- 1931, outstanding Woman of the Year, Birmingham News Loving Cup
- 1981, Alabama Women's Hall of Fame
