= New London, Alabama =

- Unincorporated community
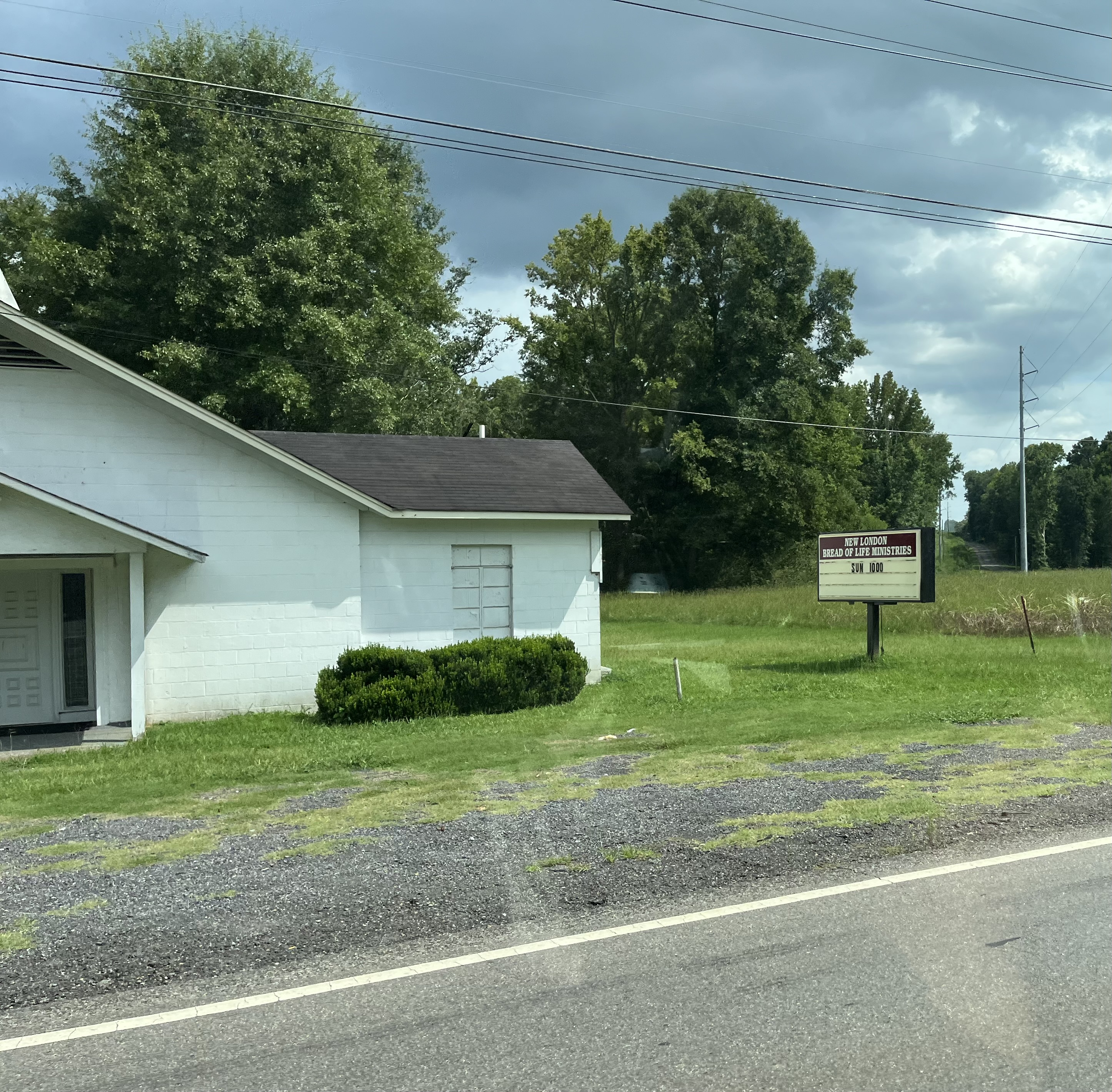
- Church in New London along US Route 231

- Location within Alabama Location within the United States
- Coordinates: 33°28′54″N 86°21′34″W
- Country: United States
- State: Alabama
- County: St. Clair
- Elevation: 466 ft (142 m)
- Time zone: UTC-6 (Central (CST))
  - Summer (DST): UTC-5 (CDT)
- Area codes: 205, 659
- GNIS feature ID: 164782

New London, also known as London, Kelly's Creek, or Kellys Creek, is an unincorporated community in St. Clair County, Alabama, United States.

== History ==
John O'Kelly was the white trader to the Upper Creek town of Coosa. His half-blood son, John O'Kelly (also known as Toe Kelly), became chief of Coosa in the 1790s. O'Kelly was invited to Pensacola in 1794 to a council with the Spanish, and he signed the Treaty of Fort Jackson as chief of Coosa in 1814. Under the treaty, O'Kelly claimed land where Kelly Creek joins the Coosa River. He then established a branch of the town Coosa along Kelly Creek. The town was then known as Kelly's Town until the Indian Removal Act. The community was originally called Kelly's Creek for the creek named for O'Kelly. After the Civil War, it became known as New London. By the 1880s, it was known primarily as London. A post office was established under the name Kellys Creek in 1841 and was in operation until 1908.

== Notable person ==
- John Abercrombie, member of the U.S. House of Representatives from 1913 to 1917 and president of the University of Alabama from 1902 to 1911.
