= 12th Pennsylvania Reserve Regiment =

Union Army infantry regiment

12th Pennsylvania Reserve Regiment (41st Pennsylvania Volunteer Infantry)
- Active: August 1861 to June 11, 1864
- Country: United States
- Allegiance: Union
- Branch: Infantry
- Engagements: Battle of Dranesville; Seven Days Battles; Battle of Mechanicsville; Battle of Gaines's Mill; Battle of Savage's Station; Battle of Glendale; Battle of Malvern Hill; Second Battle of Bull Run; Battle of South Mountain; Battle of Antietam; Battle of Fredericksburg; Battle of Gettysburg; Bristoe Campaign; Mine Run Campaign; Battle of the Wilderness; Battle of Spotsylvania Court House; Battle of Totopotomoy Creek; Battle of Cold Harbor

The 12th Pennsylvania Reserve Regiment also known as the 41st Pennsylvania Volunteer Infantry was an infantry regiment that served in the Union Army as part of the Pennsylvania Reserves infantry division during the American Civil War.

The 12th Pennsylvania Reserve Regiment was organized at Camp Curtin in 1861 as part of the Pennsylvania Reserve Corps, with John H. Taggart as colonel. The unit was composed primarily of volunteers with little military experience and initially remained in Pennsylvania after the First Battle of Bull Run, performing duties such as protecting the State Arsenal. It was mustered into federal service on August 10, 1861, and soon joined General George A. McCall's division at Tenallytown, Maryland. The regiment trained extensively before crossing into Virginia in October and encamped for the winter at Langley, participating in the Union victory at the Battle of Dranesville in December.

In spring 1862, the 12th joined the advance on Manassas, and after brief duty along the Orange and Alexandria Railroad, it moved to Falmouth, Virginia and then to the Peninsula to support General George McClellan. The regiment disembarked at White House Landing in June and proceeded to the front lines near Richmond, Virginia, where it participated in the Seven Days Battles. On June 26, it fought at the Battle of Beaver Dam Creek, holding the left of the Union line against determined Confederate attacks. Two days later, the regiment supported Griffin's Battery at Gaines' Mill, suffering casualties during intense fighting. It then withdrew across the Chickahominy River and helped protect the army’s movement to the James River during the retreat, enduring severe heat and exhaustion.

In August 1862, the regiment fought under Major General John Pope in northern Virginia and then at Antietam in September. Following winter service in the defenses of Washington, the 12th joined the Army of the Potomac at Gettysburg, arriving on July 2, 1863, and subsequently advancing to Little Round Top and the summit of Big Round Top. It later took part in Bristoe Station, Rappahannock Station, and the Mine Run operations that fall.

In May 1864, during the Overland Campaign, the regiment fought in the Battle of the Wilderness, at Spotsylvania Court House, North Anna River, and Bethesda Church, constructing fortifications and repelling repeated Confederate assaults. The 12th Pennsylvania Reserves was mustered out on June 11, 1864, in Harrisburg, Pennsylvania.

== Organization ==
Company	Moniker	Primary Location of Recruitment	Captains
A	The Wayne Guards	Philadelphia	John H. Taggart
B	The Factoryville Infantry	Wyoming County	David N. Matthewson
C	The Troy Guards	Bradford County	Richard Gustin
D	The Kepner Fencibles	Dauphin County	Samuel B. Wilt
E	The Easton Guards	Northhampton County	Peter Baldy
F	The West Newtown Guards	Westmoreland County	Andrew G. Oliver
G	The Bailey's Invincibles	York County	Samuel N. Bailey
H	The Indiana County Infantry	Indiana County	Andrew J. Bolar
I	The Huntingdon Guards	Huntingdon County	James C. Baker
K	The McClure Rifles	Franklin County	John S. Eyster

== Service ==
The 12th Pennsylvania Reserves was organized at Camp Curtin in Harrisburg, Pennsylvania beginning August 1861 and mustered in August 10, 1861 under the command of Colonel John H. Taggart.

The regiment was attached to 3rd Brigade, McCall's Pennsylvania Reserves Division, Army of the Potomac, to March 1862. 3rd Brigade, 2nd Division, I Corps, Army of the Potomac, to April 1862. 3rd Brigade, McCall's Division, Department of the Rappahannock, to June 1862. 3rd Brigade, 3rd Division, V Corps, Army of the Potomac, to August 1862. 3rd Brigade, 3rd Division, III Corps, Army of Virginia, to September 1862. 3rd Brigade, 3rd Division, I Corps, Army of the Potomac, to February 1863. 3rd Brigade, Pennsylvania Reserves Division, XXII Corps, Department of Washington, to June 1863. 3rd Brigade, 3rd Division, V Corps, Army of the Potomac, to June 1864.

The 12th Pennsylvania Reserves mustered out June 11, 1864.

== Detailed service ==
At Camp Curtin until August 10. Moved to Washington, D.C., then to Tennallytown, Md., August 10–13. Duty at Tennallytown, Md., August 13 to October 10, 1861, and at Camp Pierpont, near Langley, Va., to March 1862. Expedition to Grinnell's Farm December 6, 1861. Action at Dranesville December 20, 1861. Advance on Manassas, Va., March 10–15, 1862. McDowell's advance on Falmouth April 9–19. Duty at Fredericksburg until June. Moved to White House June 9–12. Seven Days before Richmond June 25 – July 1. Battle of Mechanicsville June 26, Battle of Gaines's Mill June 27, Battle of Charles City Cross Roads, Glendale June 30, and Battle of Malvern Hill July 1. At Harrison's Landing until August 16. Movement to join Pope August 16–26. Battle of Gainesville August 28. Battle of Groveton August 30. Second Battle of Bull Run August 30. Maryland Campaign September 6–24. Battle of South Mountain September 14. Battle of Antietam September 16–17. Duty in Maryland until October 30. Movement to Falmouth, Va., October 30 – November 19. Battle of Fredericksburg, Va., December 12–15. "Mud March" January 20–24, 1863. Ordered to Washington, D.C., February 6, and duty there and at Alexandria until June 25. Ordered to rejoin the Army of the Potomac in the field. Battle of Gettysburg, July 1–3. Pursuit of Lee July 5–24. Duty on the Rapidan until October. Bristoe Campaign October 9–22. Advance to line of the Rappahannock November 7–8. Rappahannock Station November 7. Mine Run Campaign November 26 – December 2. Guarded the Orange & Alexandria Railroad until April 1864. Rapidan Campaign May 4–31. Battle of the Wilderness May 5–7. Laurel Hill May 8. Spotsylvania May 8–12. Spotsylvania Court House May 12–21. Assault on the Salient May 12. Harris Farm May 19. North Anna River May 23–26. Jericho Mills, or Ford, May 25. Line of the Pamunkey May 26–28. Totopotomoy May 28–31.

== Casualties ==
The regiment lost a total of 181 men during service; 1 officer and 110 enlisted men killed or mortally wounded, 1 officer and 69 enlisted men died of disease.

== Commanders ==
- Colonel John H. Taggart – resigned July 8, 1862, recommissioned August 19, 1862 and mustered out September 23, 1862
- Colonel Martin Davis Hardin – promoted to brigadier general July 2, 1864
- Lieutenant Colonel Richard Gustin – commanded at the battles of Second Bull Run, Antietam, and Fredericksburg while still at the rank of captain after Col. Hardin was promoted to brigade command

== See also ==
- List of Pennsylvania Civil War Units
- Pennsylvania in the Civil War
