= Franklin W. Bowdon =

American politician (1817–1857)

Franklin Welsh Bowdon

Member of the U.S. House of Representatives from Alabama's 7th district
- In office December 7, 1846 – March 3, 1851
- Preceded by: Felix G. McConnell
- Succeeded by: Alexander White

Personal details
- Born: February 17, 1817 Chester District, South Carolina
- Died: June 8, 1857 (aged 40) Henderson, Texas, US
- Citizenship: United States
- Party: Democratic Party
- Spouse: Sarah E Chilton Bowden
- Education: University of Alabama
- Profession: Attorney politician

Franklin Welsh Bowdon (February 17, 1817 – June 8, 1857) was an American slave owner, politician and an Alabama congressman. He served in the United States House of Representatives from 1846 to 1851.

== Biography ==
Born in Chester District, South Carolina, Bowdon was the son of Samuel and Sarah Welsh Bowdon. He graduated from the University of Alabama in 1836, studied law under Daniel E. Watrous at Montevallo, was admitted to the bar and commenced practice in Talladega, Alabama as the law partner of Thomas Chilton, William P. Chilton and Tignall W. Jones.

Bowdon married Sarah E Chilton, on March 15, 1840 at Talladega, Alabama. She was the daughter of Thomas Chilton and Frances Chilton.

== Career ==
Bowdon served as a member of the Alabama House of Representatives in 1844 and 1845. He was elected as a Democrat to the Twenty-ninth United States Congress to fill the vacancy caused by the death of Felix G. McConnell. He was reelected to the Thirtieth United States Congress and Thirty-first United States Congress. He was chairman of the Committee on Public Buildings and Grounds during the Thirty-first Congress. He served as a U. S. Representative from December 7, 1846 to March 3, 1851. He did not stand for reelection in 1850 and moved to Henderson, Rusk County, Texas in 1852, where he resumed his law practice as the partner of George W. Chilton.

== Death ==
Bowdon died in Henderson on June 8, 1857 (age 40 years, 111 days). He is interred at City Cemetery, Henderson, Texas. The town of Bowdon, Georgia was named after him. He was the uncle of Sydney Johnston Bowie, who was an Alabama congressman from 1901 to 1907.

U.S. House of Representatives
Preceded by Felix G. McConnell	Member of the U.S. House of Representatives from Alabama's 7th congressional district December 7, 1846 – March 3, 1851	Succeeded by Alexander White
