= Colvin Run Mill =

Historic mill in Virginia, US

- U.S. National Register of Historic Places
- Virginia Landmarks Register
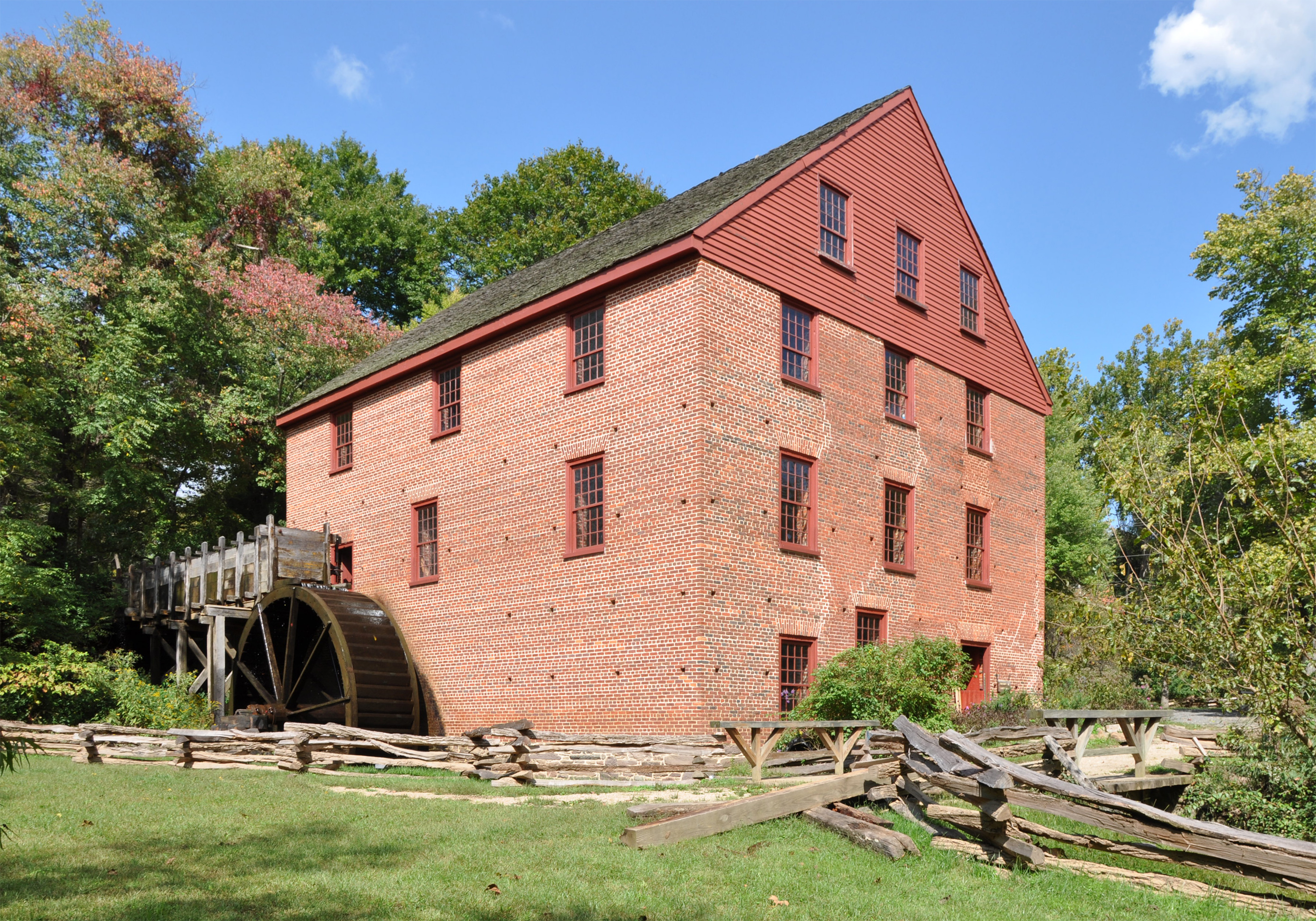
- Colvin Run Mill

- Location within Northern Virginia Location within Virginia Location within the United States
- Nearest city: Great Falls, Virginia
- Coordinates: 38°58′8″N 77°17′38″W
- Built: 1810
- NRHP reference No.: 77001487
- VLR No.: 029-0008

Significant dates
- Added to NRHP: August 16, 1977
- Designated VLR: September 21, 1976

Colvin Run Mill is in Great Falls, Virginia. Built c. 1811, Colvin Run Mill is the sole surviving operational 19th-century water-powered mill in the Washington, D.C. metropolitan area, and its restored mechanism is a nationally significant example of automated technologies pioneered in milling and later adopted across American industry.

== Location ==
Down the gravel path of the park is the miller's house, home to the families who ran the mill. In 1883, Addison Millard moved his family here when he bought the old mill. Addison, his wife Emma, and some of their 20 children lived there. When Addison died, the family stayed and operated the mill until 1934.

In the mid-1930s the mill was abandoned, and highway development caused it to be cut off from any near-by water source. The mill was later acquired by the Fairfax County Park Authority, repaired, and made open to the public.

== Civil War era ==
The Battle of Dranesville was a small battle during the American Civil War that took place between Confederate forces under Brigadier General J. E. B. Stuart and Union forces under Brigadier General Edward O. C. Ord on December 20, 1861, in Fairfax County, Virginia, as part of Major General George B. McClellan's operations in northern Virginia. The two forces on similar winter-time patrols encountered and engaged one another in the crossroads village of Dranesville.

Ord, leading the 10,000 strong 3rd Brigade of Pennsylvania Reserves set out west from Langley to clear the south bank of the Potomac River of Confederate pickets and partisans in Fairfax and Loudoun. At Colvin Run Mill, Ord left half his force to protect his rear and prevent his force from being cut off from their base at Langley. The battle resulted in a Union victory.
