= Alexander White (Alabama politician) =

American politician (1816–1893)

Member of the U.S. House of Representatives from Alabama's 7th district
- In office March 4, 1851 – March 3, 1853
- Preceded by: Franklin W. Bowdon
- Succeeded by: James F. Dowdell

Personal details
- Born: October 16, 1816 Franklin, Tennessee, U.S.
- Died: December 13, 1893 (aged 77) Dallas, Texas, U.S
- Party: Whig
- Education: University of Tennessee

Military service
- Allegiance: United States of America
- Branch/service: United States Army
- Battles/wars: Second Seminole War

Alexander White (October 16, 1816 – December 13, 1893) was an American lawyer from Alabama, who represented Alabama in the U.S Congress as a Whig (1851–53), and as a Republican (1873–75).

White was born in Franklin, Tennessee. He moved to Courtland, Alabama with his family. White went to the University of Tennessee. He then served in the United States Army during the Second Seminole War. He then move to Talladega, Alabama, studied law, and was admitted to the Alabama bar in 1837. He served in the United States House of Representatives from 1851 to 1853 and from 1873 to 1875. He served in the Confederate Army during the American Civil War. He served in the Alabama Constitutional Convention of 1865 and then served in the Alabama House of Representatives in 1872. He served briefly as Chief Justice of the Utah Territorial Supreme Court in 1875. In 1876 White moved to Dallas, Texas and resumed the practice of law. He died there in 1893 and is buried in Dallas' Greenwood Cemetery.

U.S. House of Representatives
Preceded by Franklin W. Bowdon	Member of the U.S. House of Representatives from Alabama's 7th congressional district 1851-1853	Succeeded by James F. Dowdell
Preceded by District inactive	Member of the U.S. House of Representatives from Alabama's at-large congressional district 1873–1875	Succeeded by Burwell B. Lewis
Preceded by David Perley Lowe	Chief Justice of the Utah Supreme Court; 1875–1875	Succeeded by Michael Schaeffer
