= Robert Daniel Johnston =

American brigadier general (1837–1919)

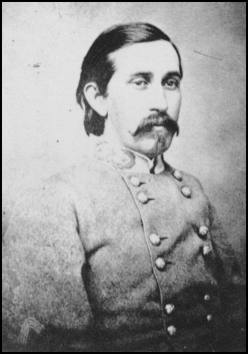
- Robert Daniel Johnson, c. 1861–1865
- Born: March 19, 1837; Lincoln County, North Carolina
- Died: February 1, 1919 (aged 81); White Post, Virginia
- Spouse: Elizabeth Johnston Evans Johnston
- Children: Gordon Johnston
- Military career
- Allegiance: Confederate States of America
- Branch: Confederate Army
- Service years: 1861–1865
- Rank: Brigadier General
- Conflicts: American Civil War

Robert Daniel Johnston (March 19, 1837 – February 1, 1919) was a brigadier general for the Confederate States of America during the American Civil War.

== Early life ==
Johnston was born in Mount Welcome, Lincoln County, North Carolina, to Dr. William and Nancy Forney Johnston. He was first cousin to future Confederate generals William H. Forney and John Horace Forney. Before the war, Johnston practiced law.

== Civil War ==
As written on his grave in Winchester, Virginia, Johnston volunteered as a private in the Bettissford Rifles then was promoted to second lieutenant in May 1861 before being promoted in the Confederate States Army where he was appointed captain and given command of Company K, 23rd North Carolina Infantry on July 15, 1861. On April 16, 1862, he was promoted to lieutenant colonel of the regiment and on May 5 saw his first action at the Battle of Williamsburg, in the Peninsula Campaign. He succeeded to the command of the regiment following the Battle of Seven Pines, where he had been wounded. He returned to duty in time to participate in the Maryland Campaign and fought at the Battle of South Mountain and the Battle of Antietam.

At Chancellorsville, Johnston was given command of the 12th North Carolina Infantry, after that unit had lost all of its field officers. He returned to the 23rd for the Gettysburg campaign and was wounded at the Battle of Gettysburg. He was promoted to brigadier general on September 1, 1863, and was given command of the brigade that Brig. Gen. Alfred Iverson, Jr., had commanded at Gettysburg. He commanded the brigade through the Overland Campaign in the spring of 1864 until he suffered his third wound at Spotsylvania. He returned to the brigade in August during Lt. Gen. Jubal A. Early's Shenandoah Valley Campaign. In that campaign he saw action at the Third Battle of Winchester, the Battle of Fisher's Hill, and the Battle of Cedar Creek. Along with the rest of Early's army, he returned to the Petersburg trenches to rejoin Gen. Robert E. Lee's Army of Northern Virginia. During his time at Petersburg, Johnston briefly commanded the division and served on detached duty attempting to catch deserters.

== Postwar career ==
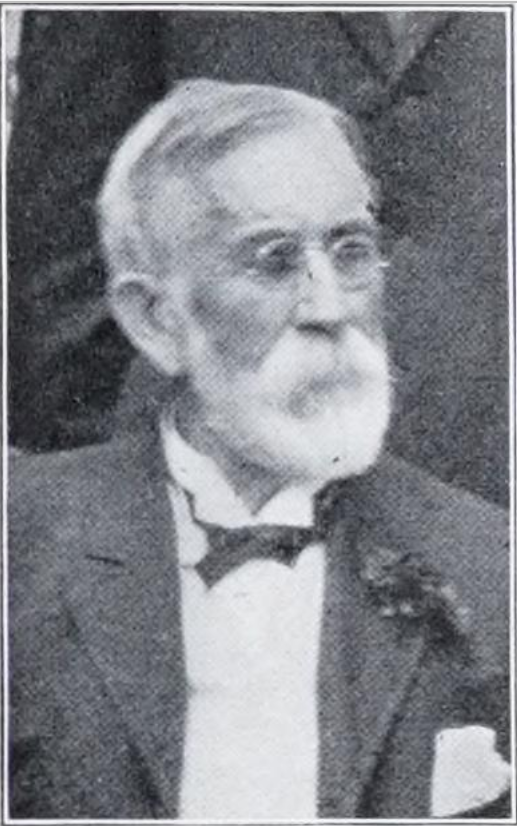
Johnston, c. 1910

Following the war, Johnston resumed his law practice in North Carolina and eventually became a banker in Alabama.

Johnston married Elizabeth Johnston "Johnsie" Evans, who founded the Alabama Boys' Industrial School. They had nine children. He was the father of Medal of Honor recipient Gordon Johnston.

== See also ==
- List of American Civil War Generals (Confederate)
