= 1st Kentucky Cavalry Regiment =

1st Kentucky Cavalry Regiment may refer to:

- 1st Kentucky Cavalry Regiment (Confederate), a regiment in the Confederate States Army
- 1st Kentucky Cavalry Regiment (Union), a regiment in the Union Army

== See also ==
- 1st Kentucky Infantry Regiment (disambiguation)
- 1st Kentucky Artillery
