= Alabama's at-large congressional district =

Historical U.S. House district in the state of Alabama

Coordinates: 32.7°N 86.7°W

- Obsolete district
- Created: 1819; 1841; 1873; 1913; 1963
- Eliminated: 1823; 1843; 1877; 1917; 1965
- Years active: 1819-1823; 1841-1843; 1873-1877; 1913-1917; 1963-1965

Alabama's at-large congressional district was a congressional district for the United States House of Representatives in Alabama active at various times from 1819 to 1965. Alabama became a state in 1819, and its single representative to the 16th and 17th Congresses was elected at-large. For the 27th Congress, all five of Alabama's representatives were elected at-large, before the state gained a representative from the 1840 census. In the 43rd to 44th Congresses, the seventh and eighth representatives gained in the 1870 census were elected at-large. For the 63rd and 64th Congresses, Alabama elected the tenth of its apportioned representatives, gained in the 1910 census, at-large from the entire state. For the 88th Congress, after the state lost one representative in the 1960 census, Alabama once again elected all of their representatives at-large.

== List of members representing the district ==
Congress & years		1st seat		2nd seat		3rd seat		4th seat		5th seat		6th seat		7th seat		8th seat	
Congress & years		Representative	Electoral history	Representative	Electoral history	Representative	Electoral history	Representative	Electoral history	Representative	Electoral history	Representative	Electoral history	Representative	Electoral history	Representative	Electoral history
District created December 14, 1819, upon achieving statehood
16th	1819–1821	John Crowell (DR-St. Stephens)	Elected late in 1819. Retired.														
17th	1821–1823	Gabriel Moore (DR-Huntsville)	Elected in 1821. Redistricted to the 1st district.														
District inactive March 4, 1823. Re-established March 4, 1841, with all five representatives elected at-large
27th	1841–1843	Reuben Chapman (D-Somerville)	Redistricted from the 1st district and re-elected in 1841. Redistricted to the 6th district.	George S. Houston (D-Athens)	Elected in 1841. Redistricted to the 5th district.	Dixon H. Lewis (D-Lowndesboro)	Redistricted from the 4th district and re-elected in 1841. Redistricted to the 3rd district.	William W. Payne (D-Gainesville)	Elected in 1841. Redistricted to the 4th district.	Benjamin G. Shields (D-Demopolis)	Elected in 1841. Retired.						
District inactive March 4, 1843. Two seats re-established March 4, 1873, elected at-large alongside six representatives elected in districts
43rd	1873–1875	Charles C. Sheats (R-Decatur)	Elected in 1872. Lost re-election.	Alexander White (R-Selma)	Elected in 1872. Lost re-election.												
44th	1875–1877	William H. Forney (D-Jacksonville)	Elected in 1874. Redistricted to the 7th district.	Burwell B. Lewis (D-Tuscaloosa)	Elected in 1874. Redistricted to the 6th district and lost re-election.												
District inactive March 4, 1877. One seat re-established March 4, 1913, elected at-large alongside nine representatives elected in districts
63rd	1913–1915	John W. Abercrombie (D-Tuscaloosa)	Elected in 1912. Re-elected in 1914. Retired														
64th	1915–1917	John W. Abercrombie (D-Tuscaloosa)	Elected in 1912. Re-elected in 1914. Retired														
District inactive March 4, 1917. Re-established January 4, 1963, with all eight representatives elected at-large
88th	1963–1965	Albert Rains (D-Gadsden)	Redistricted from the 5th district and re-elected in 1962. Retired.	George M. Grant (D-Troy)	Redistricted from the 2nd district and re-elected in 1962. Redistricted to the 2nd district and lost re-election.	George W. Andrews (D-Union Springs)	Redistricted from the 3rd district and re-elected in 1962. Redistricted to the 3rd district.	Kenneth A. Roberts (D-Anniston)	Redistricted from the 4th district and re-elected in 1962. Redistricted to the 4th district and lost re-election.	Armistead I. Selden Jr. (D-Greensboro)	Redistricted from the 6th district and re-elected in 1962. Redistricted to the 5th district.	George Huddleston Jr. (D-Birmingham)	Redistricted from the 9th district and re-elected in 1962. Redistricted to the 6th district and lost re-election.	Carl Elliott (D-Jasper)	Redistricted from the 7th district and re-elected in 1962. Redistricted to the 7th district and lost renomination.	Robert E. Jones Jr. (D-Scottsboro)	Redistricted from the 8th district and re-elected in 1962. Redistricted to the 8th district.
District inactive since January 3, 1965.
