= 11th Virginia Infantry Regiment =

- Flag of Virginia, 1861
- Active: July 1861 – Spring 1865
- Disbanded: April 1865
- Country: Confederacy
- Allegiance: Confederate States of America
- Branch: Confederate States Army
- Role: Infantry
- Engagements: First Battle of Bull Run; Battle of Dranesville; Battle of Williamsburg; Seven Days' Battles; Second Battle of Bull Run; Battle of Fredericksburg; Siege of Suffolk; Battle of Gettysburg; Battle of Plymouth; Siege of Petersburg; Battle of Five Forks; Battle of Sailor's Creek

Commanders
- Notable commanders: Colonel Samuel Garland Jr. Colonel Kirkwood Otey

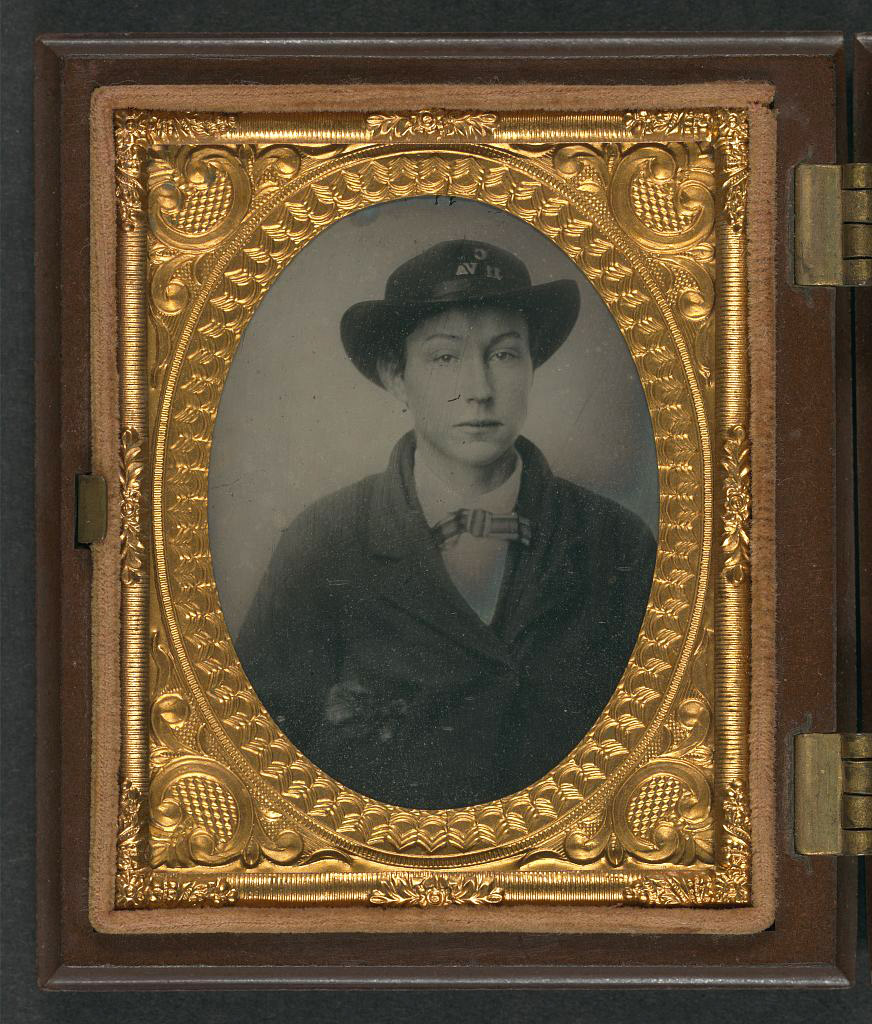
Soldier with Company C, 11th Virginia Regiment, in slouch hat

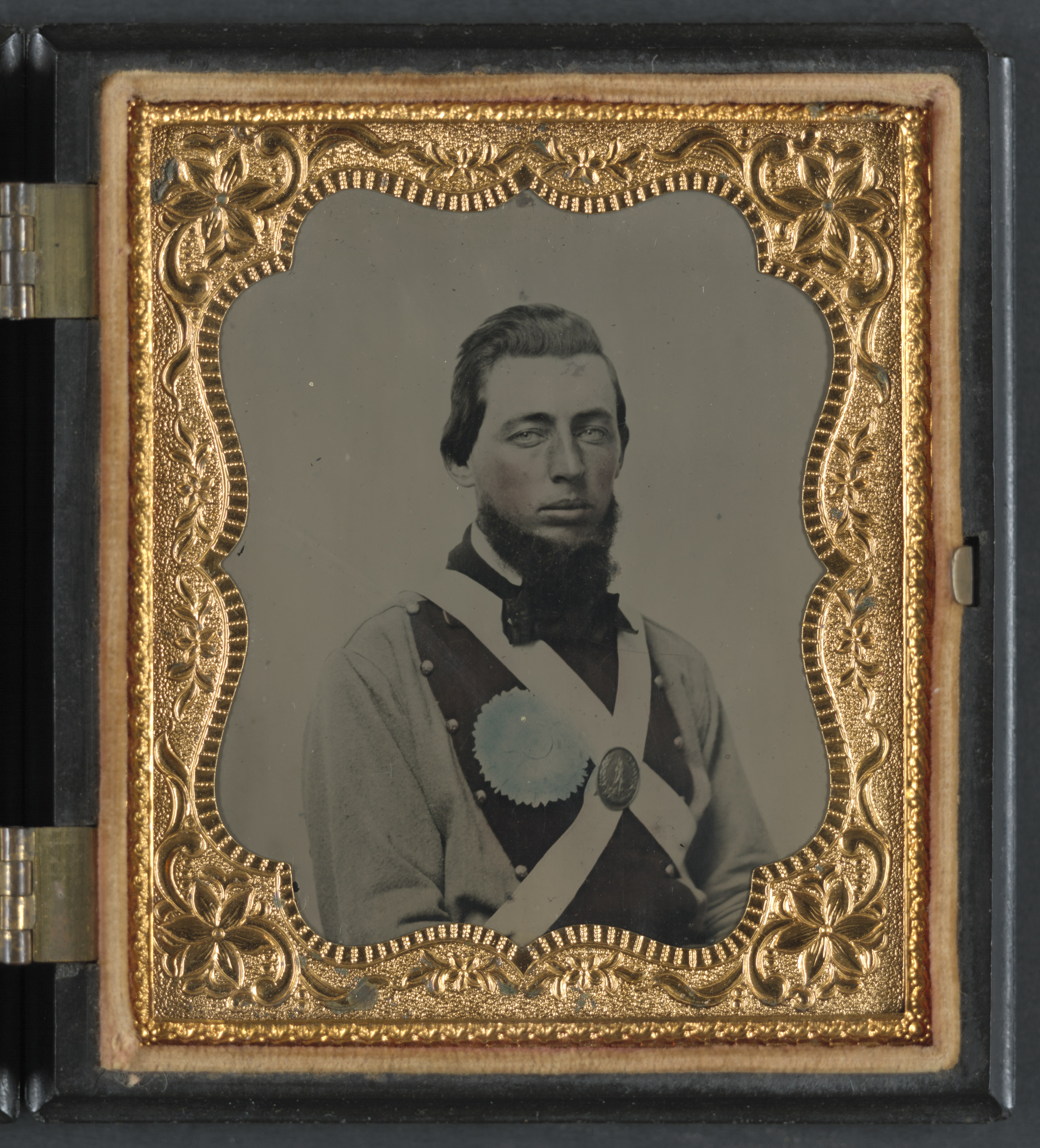
Private Peter S. Arthur of Company B, 11th Virginia Infantry Regiment

The 11th Virginia Infantry Regiment was an infantry regiment raised in Virginia for service in the Confederate States Army during the American Civil War. It fought mostly with the Army of Northern Virginia.

The 11th Virginia was organized at Lynchburg, Virginia, in May, 1861, and accepted into Confederate service in July. Its members were raised in the counties of Campbell, Botetourt, Montgomery, Fauquier, Culpeper, and Rockbridge.

The unit fought at First Manassas in a brigade under James Longstreet and at Dranesville under J.E.B. Stuart. Later it was assigned to General A.P. Hill's, Kemper's, and W.R. Terry's Brigade, Army of Northern Virginia. It served with the army from Williamsburg to Gettysburg except when it was at Suffolk with Longstreet. The 11th was engaged at Plymouth in North Carolina and after returning to Virginia saw action at Drewry's Bluff and Cold Harbor. It went on to fight in the Petersburg trenches south and north of the James River and ended the war at Appomattox.

This regiment reported 6 killed and 15 wounded at Dranesville, totalled 750 men in April, 1862, and lost 134 at Williamsburg and 100 at Frayser's Farm. It sustained 63 casualties at Second Manassas, had about forty percent disabled of the 359 engaged at Gettysburg, and lost 15 killed and 94 wounded at Drewry's Bluff. Many were captured at Sayler's Creek, and only 1 officer and 28 men surrendered.

The field officers were Colonels David Funsten, Samuel Garland Jr., Maurice S. Langhorne, and Kirkwood Otey; and Majors Adam Clement, Carter H. Harrison, and J.R. Hutter.

== See also ==
- List of Virginia Civil War units
- 11th Virginia Regiment (American Revolutionary War unit)
