= 1st Kentucky Infantry Regiment (Confederate) =

- Active: August 1861 – May 14, 1862
- Country: Confederate States of America
- Allegiance: Confederate States Army
- Branch: Infantry
- Type: Regiment
- Equipment: 1st Regiment Kentucky Volunteers, CSA
- Engagements: Battle of Dranesville; Battle of Yorktown

Commanders
- Notable commanders: Col. Thomas H. Taylor

The 1st Regiment Kentucky Volunteers, CSA was an infantry regiment that served in the Confederate States Army during the American Civil War. It was the only Kentucky regiment in the Confederate service to serve in the Army of Northern Virginia.

== Service ==
The 1st Regiment Kentucky Volunteers, CSA was organized in August 1861, by consolidation of three battalions of Kentucky infantry, two stationed at Harper's Ferry, Virginia (now in West Virginia). One battalion, the 1st Kentucky Battalion (Duncan's) was under the command of Major Henry Blanton Duncan (b. 1827) and the 2nd Battalion of Kentucky Sharpshooters was under the command of Major John D. Pope. The 3rd Kentucky Battalion commanded by Major Benjamin M. Anderson had been stationed at Richmond, Virginia. All three battalions were consolidated into the 1st Regiment Kentucky Volunteers at Manassas Junction, Virginia. Majors Pope and Anderson were returned to their companies as captains. Duncan had resigned at Winchester in June 1861. Col. Thomas Claiborne, of Tennessee, had assumed command of the 1st battalion until the formation of the regiment.

The regiment had ten companies. The two battalions arrived in Virginia at Harper's Ferry, later moving to Winchester. The two battalions moved with Joe Johnston's Army of the Shenandoah to join Beauregard's Army of the Potomac at Manassas Junction, but arrived the day following the First Battle of Bull Run under the command of Major Thomas Claiborne. With Duncan, who submitted his resignation on August 13, gone, the two battalions merged. In August a third battalion of three companies, then around Newport News, Virginia, and augmented by a company of Kentuckians from the 1st Louisiana, were ordered by Richmond to join with the six companies then at Manassas Junction. Lt. Col. Thomas Hart Taylor was assigned command of the regiment on August 7, 1861. Taylor was later promoted to full colonel and remained in command until the unit was mustered out.

The regiment was assigned to a brigade under the command of J.E.B. Stuart and participated in the Battle of Dranesville at Dranesville, Virginia. In mid-1862, the regiment was ordered to Richmond and later participated in the Battle of Yorktown at Yorktown, Virginia. Following the battle, the 1st Kentucky Infantry was ordered back to Richmond where it remained until its twelve-month enlistment expired. The men were mustered out of service on May 13 and 14, 1862.

== Commanders ==
- Colonel Thomas H. Taylor

== See also ==
- List of Kentucky Civil War Confederate units
- Kentucky in the Civil War
