= Albert Rains =

American politician (1902–1991)

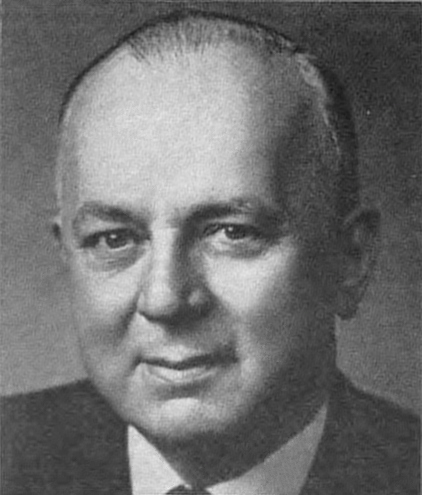

Member of the U.S. House of Representatives from Alabama
- In office January 3, 1945 – January 3, 1965
- Preceded by: Joe Starnes
- Succeeded by: Armistead Selden (redistricting)
- Constituency: 5th district (1945–1963); At-large (1963–1965)

Personal details
- Born: March 11, 1902 Grove Oak, Alabama
- Died: March 22, 1991 (aged 89) Gadsden, Alabama
- Party: Democratic
- Education: Alabama State Teachers College, University of Alabama
- Occupation: Attorney

Albert McKinley Rains (March 11, 1902 – March 22, 1991) was a U.S. representative from Alabama.

Born in Grove Oak, Alabama, Rains attended the public schools, Snead Seminary, Boaz, Alabama, State Teachers College (now Jacksonville State University), Jacksonville, Alabama, and the University of Alabama at Tuscaloosa. He studied law, was admitted to the bar in 1928 and commenced practice in Gadsden, Alabama, in 1929. He served as deputy solicitor for Etowah County, Alabama, from 1930 to 1935, and as city attorney for the city of Gadsden, Alabama, from 1935 to 1944. He served as a member of the Alabama House of Representatives between 1941 and 1944.

A New Deal Democrat, Rains was elected to the Seventy-ninth and to the nine succeeding Congresses (January 3, 1945 – January 3, 1965). His legislative proposals expanded Federal Housing Administration programs that made housing affordable and available for millions of persons. Other programs that bear his legislative imprint include housing for the elderly, urban renewal and redevelopment, nursing homes and rural housing programs. He wrote the nation's first mass transit bill and was instrumental in legislation that led to the establishment of the Interstate Highway System.

He was an ardent supporter of the Tennessee Valley Authority and supported legislation that provided for the full development of the Coosa-Alabama River System.

He was not a candidate for renomination to the Eighty-ninth Congress. He served as chairman of board, First City National Bank (later First Alabama Bank of Gadsden) until becoming chairman emeritus in 1979. He was a resident of Gadsden, Alabama, until his death there on March 22, 1991.

U.S. House of Representatives
Preceded by Joe Starnes	Member of the U.S. House of Representatives from Alabama's 5th congressional district 1945–1963	Succeeded by Armistead Selden (1965)
Preceded by John Abercrombie (1917)	Member of the U.S. House of Representatives from Alabama's at-large congressional district 1963–1965	Succeeded by District inactive
