= Felix G. McConnell =

American politician (1809–1846)

Member of the U.S. House of Representatives from Alabama's 7th district
- In office March 4, 1843 – September 10, 1846
- Preceded by: District created
- Succeeded by: Franklin W. Bowdon

Member of the Alabama House of Representatives
- In office 1838

Member of the Alabama Senate
- In office 1839-1843

Personal details
- Born: Felix Grundy McConnell; April 1, 1809 Nashville, Tennessee, US
- Died: September 10, 1846 (aged 37) Washington, D.C., US
- Party: Democratic

Felix Grundy McConnell (April 1, 1809 – September 10, 1846) was a U.S. representative from Alabama.

Born in Nashville, Tennessee, McConnell moved with his parents to Fayetteville, Tennessee, in 1811. He received a limited education and became a saddler. He moved to Talladega, Alabama, in 1834. He studied law. He was admitted to the bar in 1836 and commenced practice in Talladega, Alabama. He served as member of the State house of representatives in 1838. He served in the State senate 1839-1843.

McConnell was elected as a Democrat to the Twenty-eighth and Twenty-ninth Congresses and served from March 4, 1843 until his death. During his tenure in Congress, he introduced a resolution proposing the United States annex Ireland. McConnell gained a reputation for his rambunctious behavior and heavy drinking. He was involved in a number of public incidents both at home and in Washington. One of these was his noisy interruption of a concert by renowned violinist Ole Bull:

In the midst of one of his most exquisite performances, while every breath was suspended, and every ear attentive to catch the sounds of his magical instrument, the silence was suddenly broken and the harmony harshly interrupted by the well-known voice of General Felix Grundy McConnell, a Representative from the Talladega district of Alabama, shouting, "None of your high-falutin, but give us Hail Columbia, and bear hard on the treble!" "Turn him out," was shouted from every part of the house, and the police force in attendance undertook to remove him from the hall. "Mac," as he was called, was not only one of the handsomest men in Congress, but one of the most athletic, and it was a difficult task for the policemen to overpower him, although they used their clubs. After he was carried from the hall, some of his Congressional friends interfered, and secured his release.

On September 10, 1846, in Washington, D.C., McConnell killed himself, stabbing himself in the throat and on his body, believed to have been committed in a state of mental hallucination due to delirium tremens. He was interred in the Congressional Cemetery.

== See also ==
- List of members of the United States Congress who died in office (1790–1899)

U.S. House of Representatives
Preceded by District established	Member of the U.S. House of Representatives from Alabama's 7th congressional district March 4, 1843 – September 10, 1846	Succeeded by Franklin W. Bowdon
