= Charles Christopher Sheats =

American politician (1839–1904)

Charles C. Sheats
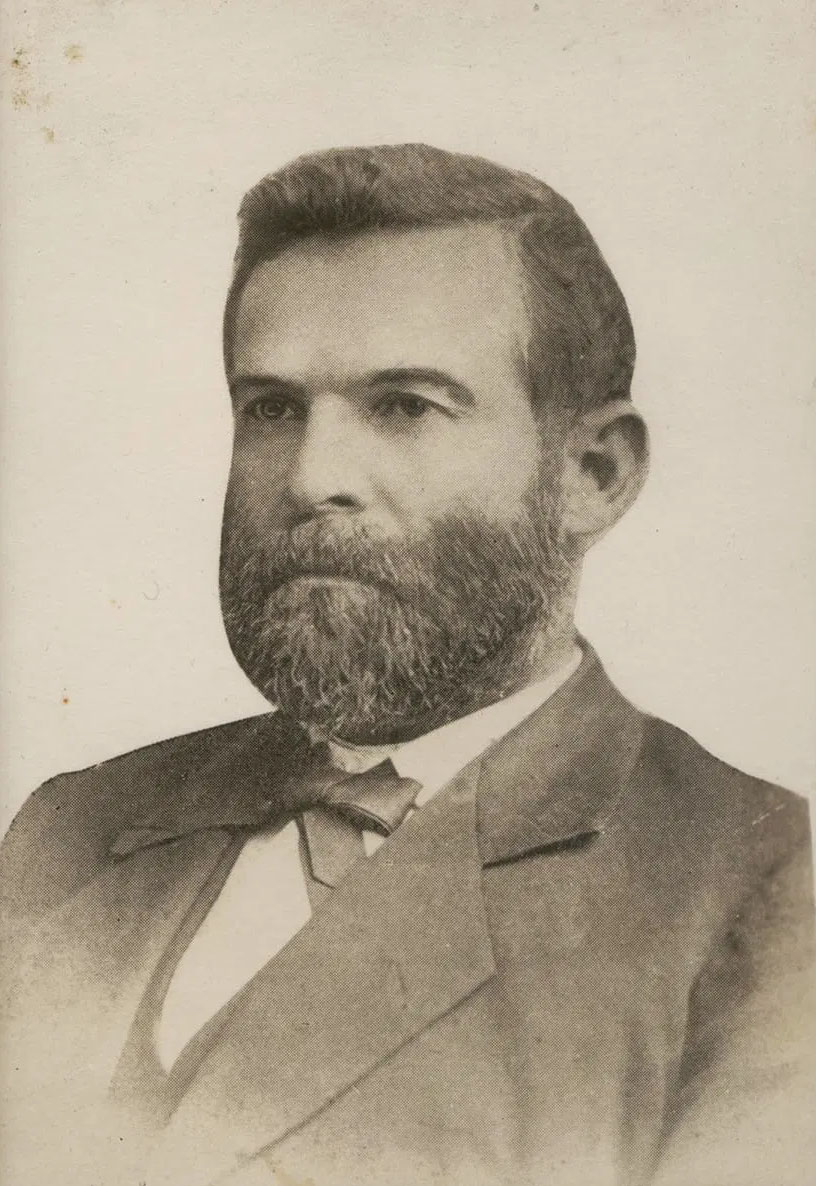

Member of the U.S. House of Representatives from Alabama's at-large district
- In office March 4, 1873 – March 3, 1875
- Preceded by: District inactive
- Succeeded by: William H. Forney

Personal details
- Born: Charles Christopher Sheats; April 10, 1839 Walker County, Alabama, U.S.
- Died: May 27, 1904 (aged 65) Decatur, Alabama, U.S.
- Resting place: McKendree Cemetery, Danville, Alabama, U.S.
- Party: Republican
- Spouse: Mary Dickson Anderson (m. 1886)

Charles Christopher Sheats (April 10, 1839 – May 27, 1904), an attorney and politician from the state of Alabama, was U.S. Consul to Denmark from 1869 to 1873 and served one term in the United States House of Representatives from 1873 to 1875. He is noted for his allegiance to the Union during the American Civil War.

== Early life and career ==
Sheats was born on April 10, 1839, to planter William W. Sheats and his wife, Mary Garner Sheats, in Walker County, Alabama. He was raised on a farm and educated at Somerville Academy in Morgan County, Alabama. After graduation, he worked as a school teacher and became involved in politics.

=== Support for Union ===
At the age of 21, Sheats was elected to represent Winston County, Alabama, at the Alabama Secession Convention of 1861. He became an increasingly vocal supporter of the Union and refused to sign the state's Ordinance of Secession, even after it had been passed by a vote of 61 to 39. Following the convention, Sheats and fellow Unionists met at Looney's Tavern, near Addison, Alabama, and declared Winston County a neutral state, the "Free State of Winston."

== Civil War years ==
In the Fall of 1861, Sheats was elected by citizens of Winston County, Alabama, to the Alabama House of Representatives. He did not attend the session because of his refusal to swear a required oath of allegiance to the Confederacy. He was subsequently expelled from the legislature the following year on a charge of treason.

Fleeing to the mountains of North Alabama, Sheats avoided conscription in the Confederate Army and encouraged men to join the Union Army, actions which led to the establishment of the 1st Alabama Cavalry. In one recruitment speech, Sheats spoke to an estimated audience of over two thousand citizens. He was determined to enlist himself, but was arrested in July 1862 for his actions.

Sheats was released from Confederate custody after several months, but was arrested again in 1863 for his pro-Union sentiments and remained a prisoner until the end of the Civil War. During this time, he was a candidate to the 39th United States Congress, but was not elected.

== Later career and death ==
After the Civil War, Sheats was a member of the Alabama Constitutional Convention of 1865. He also studied law and was admitted to the bar in 1867, and began a legal practice in Decatur, Alabama, where he served as mayor in 1868. He was invited to be a Republican elector when Ulysses S. Grant was elected president in 1868 and 1872. President Grant appointed Sheats as U.S. Consul to Denmark in 1869, where he served until his election to the United States House of Representatives in 1873.

Following an unsuccessful reelection campaign, Sheats returned to Alabama where he was appointed Appraiser of Merchandise for the Port of Mobile and Assistant Collector of Internal Revenue. He married Mary Dickson Anderson on January 27, 1886, and once again settled in Decatur, Alabama, where he remained until his death on May 27, 1904. Sheats was buried at McKendree Cemetery in Morgan County, Alabama.

== Additional Sources ==
- Dodd, Donald B., and Amy Bartlett-Dodd. The Free State of Winston. Charleston, S.C.: Arcadia Publishing, 2000.
- Dodd, Donald B., and Wynelle S. Dodd. Winston: An Antebellum and Civil War History of a Hill County of North Alabama. Vol. 4 of Annals of Northwest Alabama, comp. Carl Elliot. Birmingham: Oxmoor Press, 1972.
- Heritage of Winston County. Clanton, Ala.: Heritage Publishing Consultants, 1998.
- Raines, Howell. Silent Cavalry: How Union Soldiers from Alabama Helped Sherman Burn Atlanta—And Then Got Written Out of History. New York: Crown, 2023.
- Winston County Heritage Book Committee. The Heritage of Winston County, Alabama. Clanton, Ala.: Heritage Publishing Consultants, 1998.

U.S. House of Representatives
Preceded by District inactive	Member of the U.S. House of Representatives from Alabama's at-large congressional district 1873–1875	Succeeded by William H. Forney
