= Gordon Johnston (soldier) =

US Army officer and Medal of Honor recipient (1874–1934)

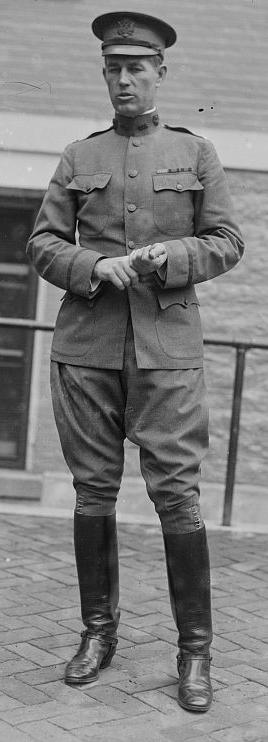
- Gordon Johnston, Medal of Honor recipient
- Born: May 25, 1874; Charlotte, North Carolina, U.S.
- Died: March 8, 1934 (aged 59); Fort Sam Houston, Texas, U.S.
- Burial place: Arlington National Cemetery
- Military career
- Allegiance: United States of America
- Branch: United States Army
- Service years: 1898–1934
- Rank: Colonel
- Unit: 6th Infantry Regiment
- Conflicts: Spanish–American War; Battle of Las Guasimas; Battle of San Juan Hill; Philippine–American War; First Battle of Bud Dajo; World War I; Meuse-Argonne Offensive
- Awards: Medal of Honor; Distinguished Service Cross; Distinguished Service Medal; Silver Star (3); Purple Heart; Officer of the Legion of Honor (France)

Gordon Johnston
Playing career
- 1894–1895: Princeton
- Position: Tackle

Coaching career (HC unless noted)
- 1896: North Carolina

Head coaching record
- Overall: 3–4–1

Gordon Johnston (May 25, 1874 – March 8, 1934) was an American soldier, Medal of Honor recipient, and college football player and coach. He played at the tackle position for Princeton University and served as the head coach of the University of North Carolina football team in 1896. He served as an officer in the United States Army during the Spanish–American War, the Philippine–American War and World War I, and received the Medal of Honor for his actions during the Philippine–American War.

== Biography ==
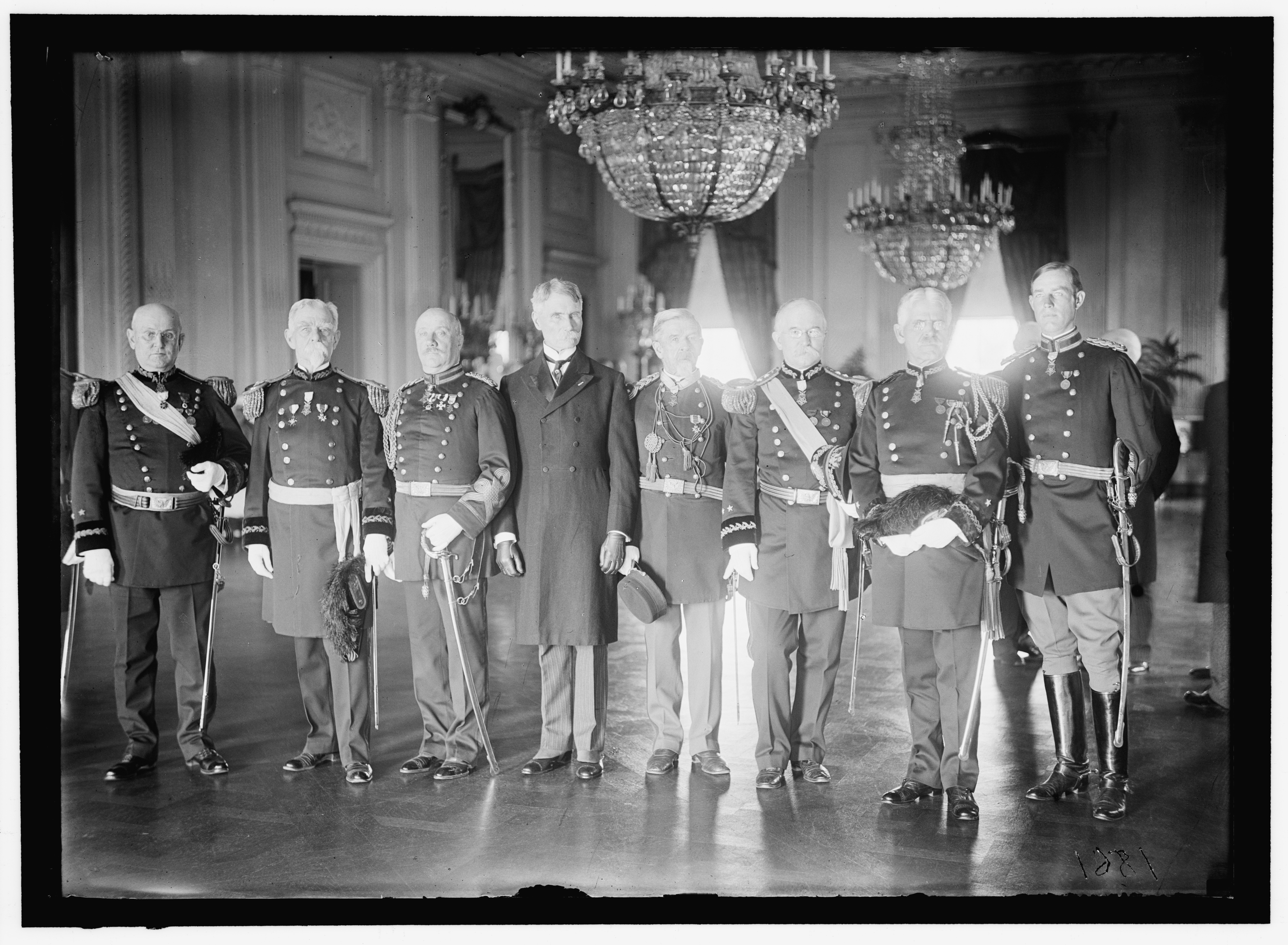
Gordon Johnston at right awarded Medal of Honor November 7, 1910

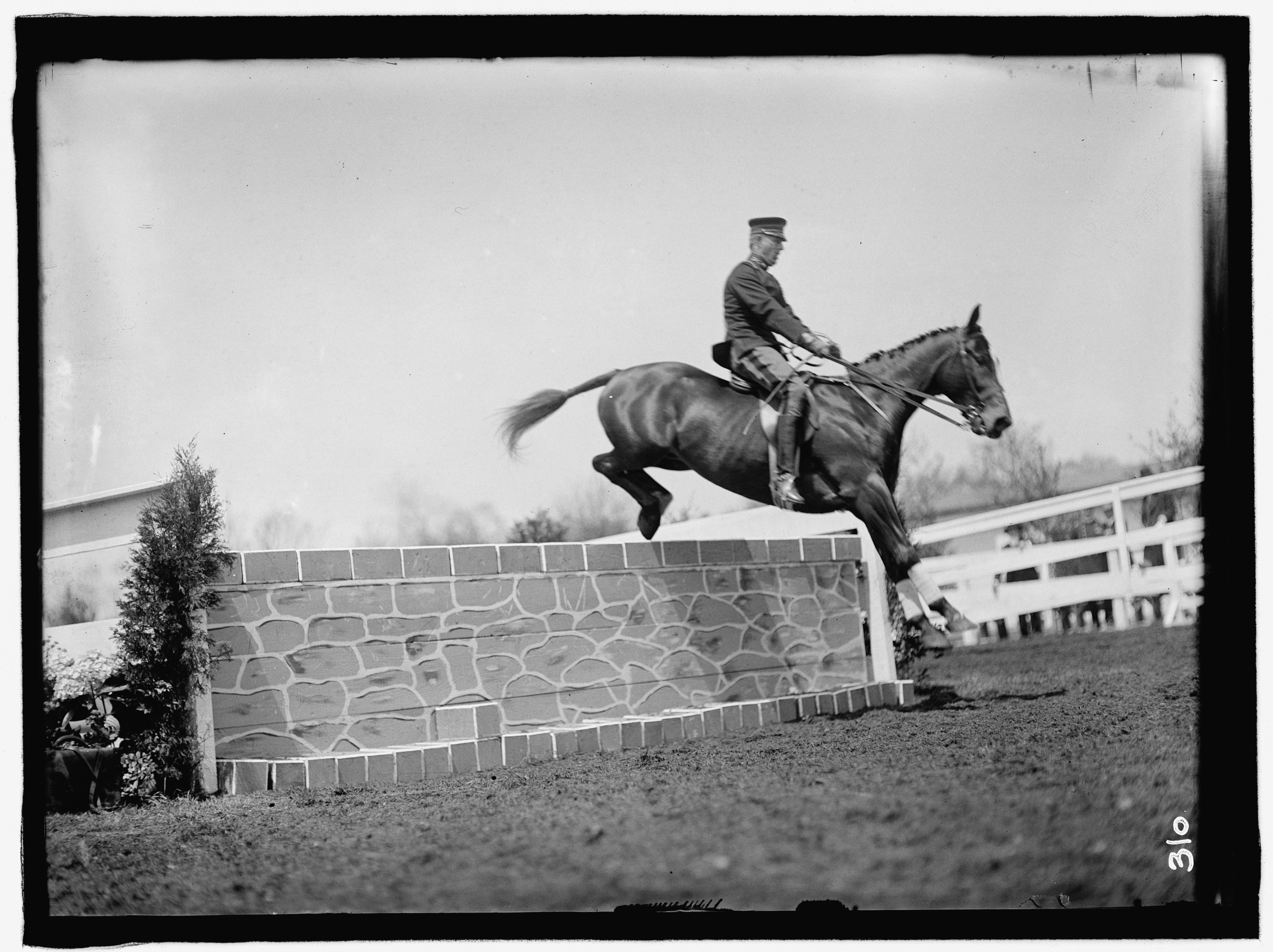
Gordon Johnston hurdling in a horse show (1911)

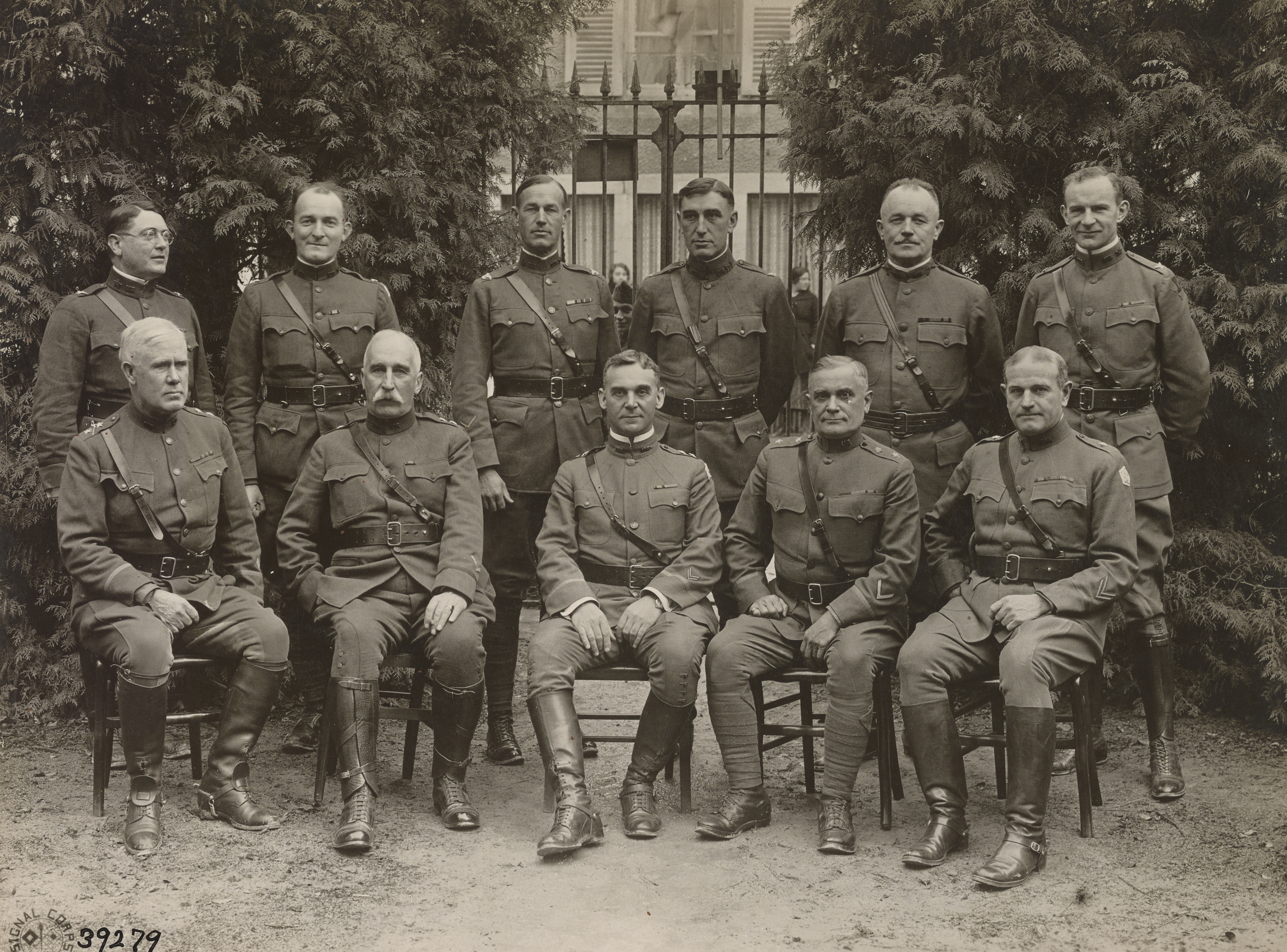
Major General Charles P. Summerall (center) along with members of his staff and senior commanders in his V Corps, pictured here in 1918 or 1919. Colonel Gordon Johnston, chief of staff of the 82nd Division, is stood on the far left.

Gordon Johnston was the son of Confederate General Robert Daniel Johnston and the philanthropist, Elizabeth Johnston Evans Johnston. Through his mother he was the great grandson of North Carolina Governor John Motley Morehead. According to Princeton records he was born in "the old home" near Birmingham, Alabama. However, the 1880 census indicates he was born in North Carolina. After graduating from Birmingham High School, Johnston enrolled at Princeton University in New Jersey. While attending the university, Johnston played college football as a tackle for two years in 1894 and 1895. Football historian Parke H. Davis described Johnston as a "high spirited, fleetfooted, dashing" football player at Princeton. Johnston became a member of The Tiger Inn. He graduated from Princeton in 1896 and became the head football coach of the University of North Carolina football team in 1896.

In 1896, he also worked in the insurance business as a member of the Johnston & Badham firm in North Carolina. From 1897 to 1898, he was associated with the Buck Johnston Abstract Co. in Memphis, Tennessee.

In 1898, Johnston enlisted in the United States Army to fight in the Spanish–American War, serving in Cuba with the 1st U.S. Volunteer Cavalry Regiment, better known as the Rough Riders. After a brief return to civilian life, he was offered a commission as a second lieutenant in the Army in 1899 on the recommendation of Theodore Roosevelt.

Johnston was posted to the Philippines where he served with the 43rd Infantry Regiment in the Philippine–American War. On February 1, 1900, Johnston's actions as the leader of a small detachment of scouts was to earn him the nation's second highest award for bravery, the Distinguished Service Cross. The citation states: "... Lieutenant Johnston displayed remarkable gallantry and leadership in charging a greatly superior force of entrenched insurgents in the face of cannon and rifle fire, driving the enemy from their position and capturing the town of Palo."

Johnston returned to the United States, where he was the honor graduate in 1903 from the U.S. Army's infantry and cavalry school. In 1904, he was married to Anna Julia Johnson in Baltimore, Maryland.

Johnston returned to the Philippines as a first lieutenant in the Signal Corps with the 6th Infantry Regiment. On March 7, 1906, Johnston distinguished himself under heavy fire in the First Battle of Bud Dajo, where he was severely wounded. For his actions in this battle, Johnson received the Medal of Honor.

Johnston went on to lead a distinguished career in the Army. Johnston was to win the Distinguished Service Medal for his work as the chief of staff for the 82nd Infantry Division during the Meuse-Argonne Offensive of World War I. Johnston died in a polo accident at Fort Sam Houston on March 8, 1934.

He was buried at Arlington National Cemetery, in Arlington, Virginia. Camp Gordon Johnston in Carrabelle, Florida was named in his honor.

== Medal of Honor citation ==
Citation:

Voluntarily took part in and was dangerously wounded during an assault on the enemy's works.

== Head coaching record ==
| Year | Team | Overall | Conference | Standing | Bowl/playoffs |
|---|---|---|---|---|---|
North Carolina Tar Heels (Southern Intercollegiate Athletic Association) (1896)
| 1896 | North Carolina | 3–4–1 | 0–1 | T–14th | |
| North Carolina: | | 3–4–1 | 0–1 | | |
| Total: | | 3–4–1 | | | |

== See also ==
- List of Medal of Honor recipients
