= John Horace Forney =

Confederate Army general (1829–1902)

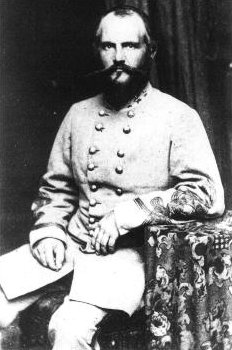
- Born: August 12, 1829; Lincolnton, North Carolina
- Died: September 13, 1902 (aged 73); Jacksonville, Alabama
- Burial place: City Cemetery, Jacksonville, Alabama
- Military career
- Allegiance: United States of America; Confederate States of America
- Branch: United States Army; Confederate States Army
- Service years: 1851–1861 (US); 1861–1865 (CSA)
- Rank: First Lieutenant (USA); Major General (CSA)
- Conflicts: American Civil War: First Battle of Bull Run; Battle of Vicksburg
- Other work: Civil engineer Farmer

John Horace Forney (August 12, 1829 – September 13, 1902) was a farmer, civil engineer, and major general in the Confederate States Army during the American Civil War. Being promoted to the rank of major general on October 27, 1862, Forney participated in the Battles of First Bull Run and Vicksburg before being captured. He held several other commands until the end of the Civil War, living in Alabama until his death in 1902.

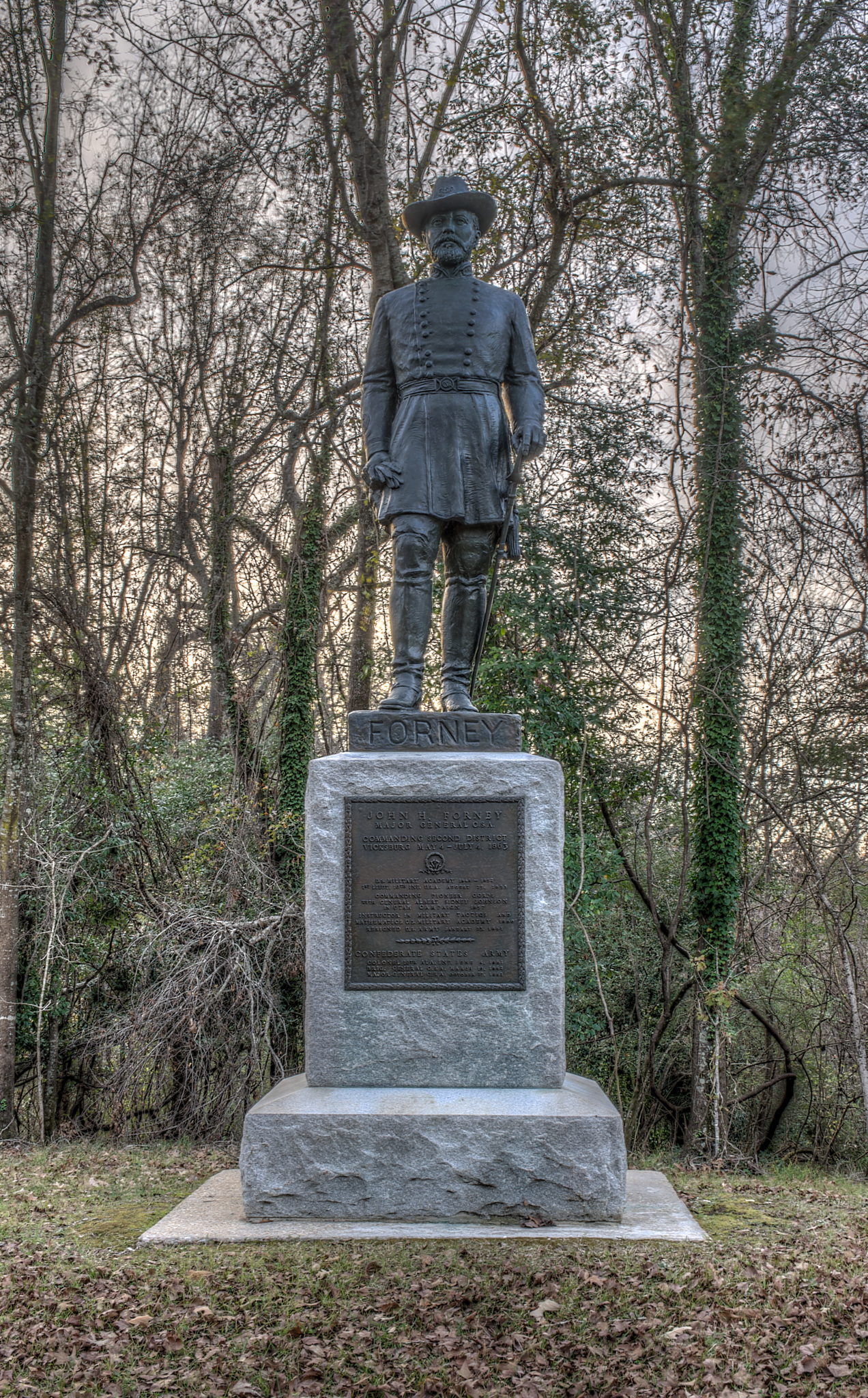
Statue at Vicksburg National Military Park

== Background ==
John Horace Forney was born in Lincolnton, North Carolina, to Jacob and Sabina Swope Hoke Forney on August 12, 1829. He was the younger brother of Confederate Brigadier General William H. Forney, first cousin of Confederate Brigadier General Robert Daniel Johnston, and second cousin of Confederate Major Generals Robert F. Hoke and Stephen Dodson Ramseur. He moved with his parents to Alabama in 1835.

John Horace Forney was appointed to the United States Military Academy at West Point, New York and graduated in 1852, twenty-second in his class. Forney was commissioned brevet second lieutenant of the 7th U.S. Infantry on July 1, 1852. He was promoted to second lieutenant on October 24, 1853, and transferred to the 10th Infantry on March 3, 1855. He was promoted to first lieutenant on August 25, 1855. He participated in the Mormon campaign in 1857 and 1858.

== Civil War ==
Forney resigned his commission on January 23, 1861, and entered the Confederate Army as colonel of the Alabama Artillery, then as a captain of infantry on March 14, 1861 and colonel of the 10th Alabama Infantry in the Army of the Shenandoah on June 21, 1861. He took command of the 5th Brigade and other Confederate forces in the Shenandoah Valley on June 21, 1861 while the remainder of that army moved to participate that same day at the First Battle of Bull Run until October 1861. He was wounded at the Battle of Dranesville, Virginia, on December 20, 1861. Forney was promoted to brigadier general on March 10, 1862, and to major general on October 27.

After service as commander of the Departments of Alabama and West Florida and the District of the Gulf Department No. 2 in 1862 and the 2d Military District Department of Mississippi and East Louisiana in early 1863, he was given command of a division of Lieutenant General John C. Pemberton's Army of Mississippi defending Vicksburg in April 1863. He was captured there when the city fell in July 1863.

After being exchanged on October 13, 1863, Forney was a division commander in the Department of Mississippi and East Louisiana until January 28, 1864, then in the Department of Alabama, Mississippi and East Louisiana until May 1864. After a period without a command, he followed John George Walker as commander of the Texas Division, Division 1 of I Corps, Trans-Mississippi Army in September 1864. From March 27, 1865 until May 12, 1865, he commanded a division in the Department of Texas, New Mexico and Arizona.

== Post-war and death ==
At the end of the war, he returned to Alabama, where he was a farmer and civil engineer until his death in Jacksonville on September 13, 1902. He was interred at City Cemetery, Jacksonville, Calhoun County, Alabama.

== See also ==
- List of American Civil War generals (Confederate)
