= Thomas H. Taylor =

Confederate Army colonel (1825–1901)

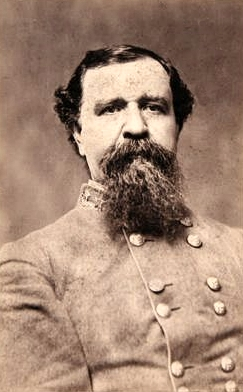
- Born: July 31, 1825; Frankfort, Kentucky, U.S.
- Died: April 12, 1901 (aged 75); Louisville, Kentucky, U.S.
- Burial place: Frankfort, Kentucky, U.S.
- Military career
- Allegiance: United States of America; Confederate States of America
- Branch: United States Army; Confederate States Army
- Service years: 1846–1848 (USA); 1861–1865 (CSA)
- Rank: First Lieutenant (USA); Colonel (CSA); Brigadier General (CSA) (unconfirmed)
- Conflicts: Mexican–American War; American Civil War
- Other work: Chief of police, Louisville, Kentucky

Thomas Hart Taylor (July 31, 1825 – April 12, 1901) was a Confederate States Army colonel, brigade commander, provost marshal and last Confederate post commander at Mobile, Alabama, during the American Civil War. His appointment as a brigadier general was refused by the Confederate Senate after Confederate President Jefferson Davis failed to nominate Taylor, apparently following Davis's appointment of Taylor to the rank. Nonetheless, Taylor's name is frequently found on lists and in sketches of Confederate generals. He was often referred to as a general both during the Civil War and the years following it. Before the Civil War, Taylor served as a first lieutenant in the 3rd Kentucky Volunteer Infantry Regiment during the Mexican–American War. After that war, he was a cattle driver, farmer and lawyer. After the Civil War, he was engaged in business in Mobile, Alabama for five years, and after returning to Kentucky, was a Deputy U.S. Marshal for five years and was chief of police at Louisville, Kentucky, for eleven years.

== Early life ==
Thomas H. Taylor was born July 31, 1825, at Frankfort, Kentucky. He was the son of Edmund Taylor, second cousin once removed of President and Major General Zachary Taylor, and his second wife, a Miss Hart. Taylor attended Kenyon College in Ohio and graduated from Centre College in Kentucky in 1843.

During the Mexican–American War, Taylor served in the 3rd Kentucky Infantry Regiment, at first as a private, and then as a first lieutenant. Taylor was a cattle driver, farmer and lawyer before the war.

Taylor was married three times. In 1844, he married Sarah Elizabeth Blandford. They had one child, Edmund Haynes Taylor, before her death in 1858. In 1864, he married Sarah A. Moreland of Mobile, Alabama, who died some time before 1878. In 1878, he married Eliza Adair Monroe. They had four children, Mary Louise, John Adair Monroe, Thomas Hart Jr. and Adair Monroe.

== American Civil War service ==
Thomas H. Taylor began his Confederate Army Civil War service as a captain of cavalry in the Army of the Confederate States of America, the Regular Army of the Confederacy. According to one source, on July 3, 1861, he became lieutenant colonel of the Confederate 1st Kentucky Infantry Regiment. Other sources indicate that the 1st Kentucky Infantry was not formed until August 7, 1861. In early July 1861, Taylor was either a member of the personal staff of Confederate President Jefferson Davis or at least a special messenger on his behalf. On July 6, 1861, Taylor took dispatches from Jefferson Davis for President Abraham Lincoln. These dispatches insisted that the crew of the privateer Savannah be treated as prisoners of war and exchanged and threatened retaliation against Union Army prisoners if the crew were hanged as pirates.

After proceeding to Manassas Junction, Virginia, by railroad, on July 8, 1861, with an escort of about 12 men from Fairfax, Virginia, Taylor set out under a flag of truce toward the Union Army headquarters of Major General Irvin McDowell at Arlington, Virginia, presumably to ultimately present the dispatches to President Lincoln. About seven miles from Arlington, Taylor was met by Union Colonel, soon to be Brigadier General, Andrew Porter, a comrade from the Mexican–American War and First Lieutenant, later Brigadier General, William W. Averell. (Note: Beattie agrees with the editors of the Jefferson Davis papers that the officer was Thomas H. Taylor, not John G. Taylor as stated by the editor of Averell's memoirs, which are incomplete. Moreover, Davis himself wrote that Colonel Thomas Taylor was the messenger. Scharf thus also errs by stating that the messenger was Colonel Richard Taylor.) After some personal conversation between Taylor and Porter, a Union cavalry escort took Taylor to Arlington, where they found McDowell was out. Taylor was taken to the office of U.S. Army General-in-Chief, Brevet Lieutenant General Winfield Scott in Washington when Scott learned of his mission and that McDowell was not present to receive him. Scott sent the dispatches to President Lincoln. Scott served wine and champagne while they waited for a reply. Due to the late hour, after 10:00 p.m., Lincoln sent no reply. Scott sent Taylor back to Major General Irvin McDowell for more hospitality and to stay the night, promising that he would send a reply from Lincoln promptly. After breakfast and with a stack of northern newspapers, Taylor and his party were escorted back to the Confederate lines. Lincoln never responded to Davis's messages. However, he did not enforce the stated policy of hanging privateers as pirates.

On August 7, 1861, General Joseph E. Johnston combined two Kentucky battalions into the 1st Kentucky Infantry Regiment. Lieutenant Colonel Taylor was ordered to take command. On September 28, 1861, the regiment skirmished with small Union Army units as the Confederates evacuated Mason's Hill and Munson's Hill, about four miles from Alexandria, Virginia. Taylor was promoted to colonel on October 14, 1861. On December 20, 1861, the regiment fought at the Battle of Dranesville as part of a large foraging party under the overall command of Brigadier General J.E.B. Stuart. Taylor became separated from his men while moving down his line and had to extricate himself from behind enemy lines after nightfall.

Taylor's regiment was assigned to Brigade 5, Division 1 of the Army of East Tennessee in March 1862. The 1st Kentucky Infantry was a 12-month regiment which was mustered out of the Confederate States Army in the summer of 1862. Taylor was assigned to brigade command in the Department of East Tennessee by Major General E. Kirby Smith. This division served at Cumberland Gap and in Kentucky.

Thomas H. Taylor was appointed brigadier general on November 4, 1862, but the Confederate Senate refused the appointment when Confederate President Jefferson Davis failed to nominate Taylor.

After commanding a brigade in Major General Carter L. Stevenson's division of the Department of Mississippi and East Louisiana from December 1862 through April 1863, Taylor became provost marshal and inspector general for the Army of Mississippi under Lieutenant General John C. Pemberton at Vicksburg, Mississippi. He was in command of an attack on Donaldsonville, Louisiana on June 27, 1863 or June 28, 1863, which was repulsed in part by gunboats on the Mississippi River.

Taylor was captured at the fall of Vicksburg to Union forces commanded by Major General Ulysses S. Grant on July 4, 1863 He was paroled, went to Montgomery, Alabama, and was later exchanged.

After his exchange, Taylor had brief service at Mobile, Alabama and then was given command of the District of Mississippi and East Louisiana in the Department of Alabama, Mississippi and East Louisiana from March 5, 1864, to April 28, 1864. Taylor was delayed by Union Major General William T. Sherman's capture of Meridian, Mississippi, after the Battle of Meridian from February 14 to February 20, 1864. Taylor took command on March 30, 1864. He had a difficult time due to his small number of troops and civilian discontent as well as Union raids. Taylor was relieved on April 28, 1864, by Colonel John S. Scott, who had lived in East Louisiana, and reported to department headquarters at Demopolis, Alabama.

On June 24, 1864, Taylor became provost marshal of the Department of Alabama and East Mississippi under Lieutenant General Stephen D. Lee at Meridian. From November 1864 until the end of the war, Taylor was in command of the post at Mobile, Alabama. In this capacity, he commanded only some reserve and local defense troops, charged more with maintaining order than defending the city, which he was compelled to evacuate with Confederate troops from local forts on April 11, 1865. According to some sources, no record of his parole has been found, but at least one source says Taylor was paroled on May 5, 1865, with troops at Jackson, Mississippi, where he acted as parole commissioner for Confederate troops in that area under orders from Lieutenant General Richard Taylor.

== Aftermath ==
After the Civil War, Taylor moved to Alabama where he engaged in business at Mobile until 1870. He returned to Kentucky and served for five years as deputy U.S. Marshal. Taylor was chief of police of Louisville, Kentucky from 1881 to 1892. Even though he had no experience as an engineer, he was superintendent of the Louisville and Portland Canal between February 1886 and 1889 when he was replaced due to a change in administration. Thomas Hart Taylor died at Louisville, Kentucky on April 12, 1901, of typhoid fever. Taylor was buried at State Cemetery, Frankfort, Kentucky.

== See also ==
- List of American Civil War generals (Acting Confederate)
