= Martin Davis Hardin =

American lawyer

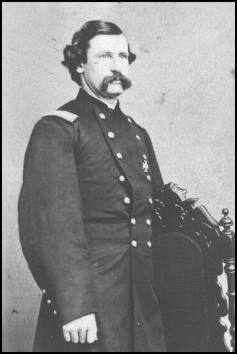
- Born: June 26, 1837; Jacksonville, Illinois
- Died: December 12, 1923 (aged 86); St. Augustine, Florida
- Burial place: St. Augustine National Cemetery, Saint Augustine, Florida
- Military career
- Allegiance: United States of America; Union
- Branch: United States Army; Union Army
- Service years: 1859 - 1870
- Rank: Brigadier General
- Conflicts: American Civil War; Seven Days Battles; Battle of Malvern Hill; Second Battle of Bull Run (WIA); Battle of Gettysburg; Mine Run Campaign (WIA); Overland Campaign; Battle of Fort Stevens

Martin Davis Hardin (June 26, 1837 – December 12, 1923) was a brigadier general in the Union Army during the American Civil War. He was appointed a brigadier general on July 6, 1864, to rank from July 2, 1864, the date of U.S. Senate confirmation of his promotion.

== Early life and education ==
Hardin was born in Jacksonville, Illinois, the son of John J. Hardin. He was a family friend and protégé of Abraham Lincoln. Although widely reported that it was at the Hardin family home that Lincoln first met his wife, Mary Todd, this is most likely false. Lincoln and his future wife probably met in Springfield. Hardin graduated from West Point in the Class of 1859, and was an aide to Robert E. Lee in the hanging of John Brown soon after.

== Military service ==
Hardin served as a colonel in the 12th Pennsylvania Reserve Regiment. He lost his left arm in the Mine Run Campaign, but continued serving in the army. He was mustered out of the volunteer service in June 1864 but returned to active duty on July 2 with an appointment to brigadier general. General Hardin commanded a division in the XXII Corps during the battle of Fort Stevens.

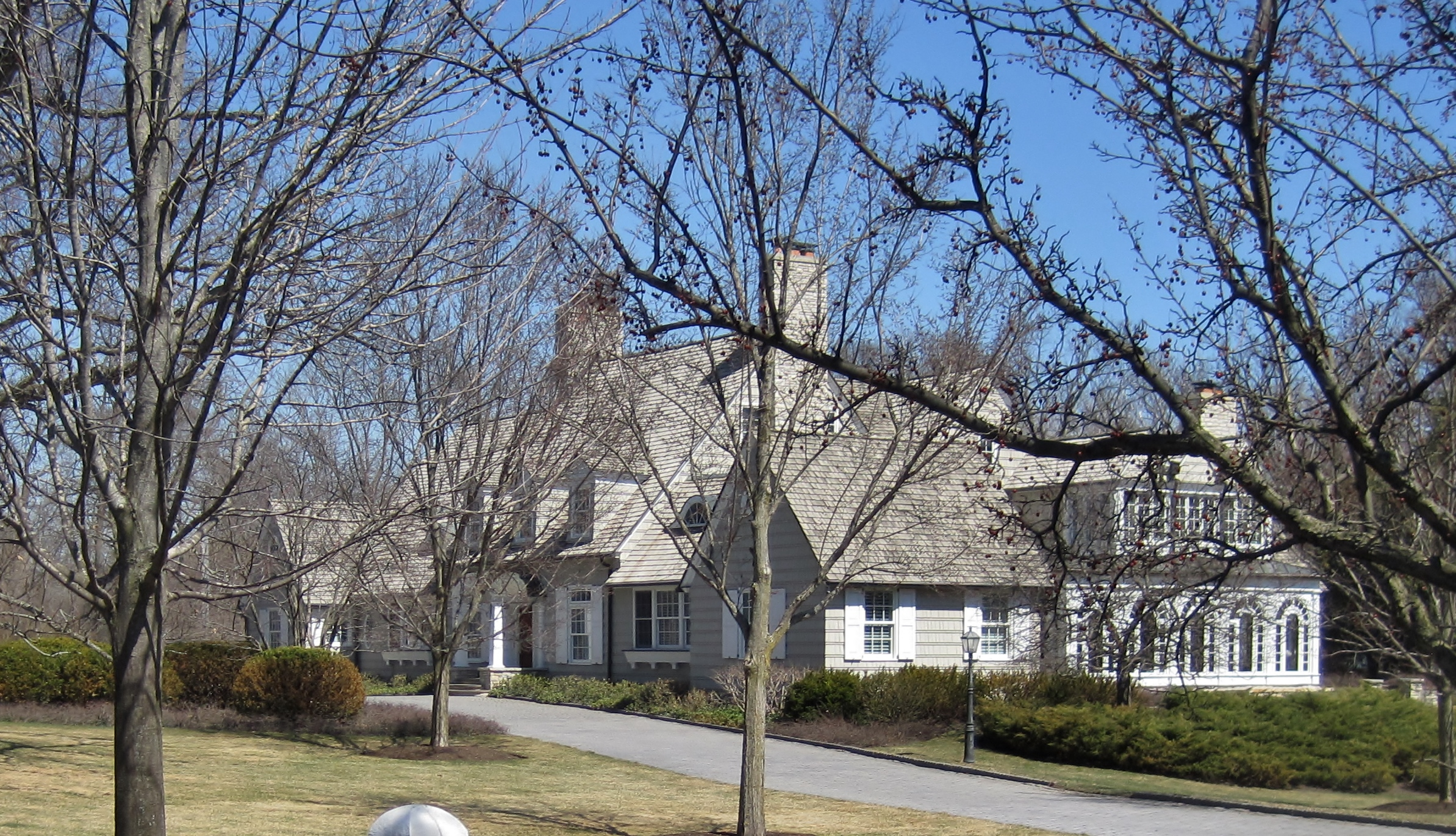
Martin Davis Mardin House in Lake Forest, Illinois

After retiring in December 1870, he became a lawyer in Chicago, and had a winter home in St. Augustine, Florida. His second wife, Amelia McLaughlin (1863–1939) was the sister-in-law of Irene Castle, the well-known dancer. Hardin spent his last years in the famous "Union Generals' House" at 20 Valencia Street in St. Augustine, Florida (saved from a proposed demolition by Flagler College in the 1980s through the concerted action of local history lovers). Hardin was one of the last surviving Civil War generals of either side at the time of his death in 1923. He is buried, with his wife, at the U.S. National Cemetery in St. Augustine. His widow honored him by building a chapel (complete with a statue of St. Martin) on the grounds of the Mission of Nombre de Dios in St. Augustine.

== See also ==
- List of American Civil War generals (Union)
