= Battle of Dranesville =

Battle of the American Civil War

- Part of the American Civil War
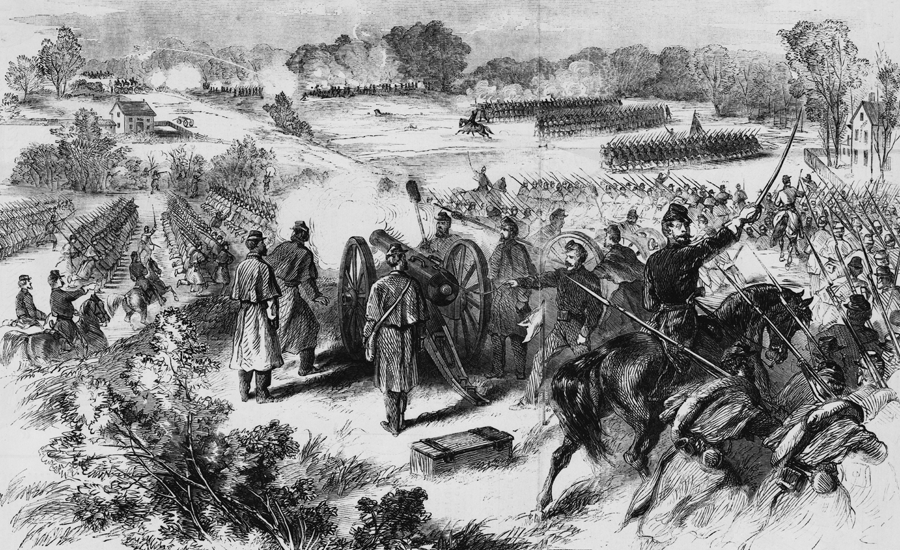
- Battle of Dranesville
Date	December 20, 1861
Location	Fairfax County, Virginia 38°59′43.7″N 77°20′13.9″W
Result	Union victory

Belligerents
United States (Union)	(Confederate States of America) CSA (Confederacy)

Commanders and leaders
Edward O. C. Ord	J. E. B. Stuart

Strength
5,000	4,000

Casualties and losses
71	230
- Location within Virginia

The Battle of Dranesville was a small battle during the American Civil War that took place between Confederate forces under Brigadier General J. E. B. Stuart and Union forces under Brigadier General Edward O. C. Ord on December 20, 1861, in Fairfax County, Virginia, as part of Major General George B. McClellan's operations in northern Virginia. The two forces on similar winter time patrols encountered and engaged one another in the crossroads village of Dranesville. The battle resulted in a Union victory.

== Background ==
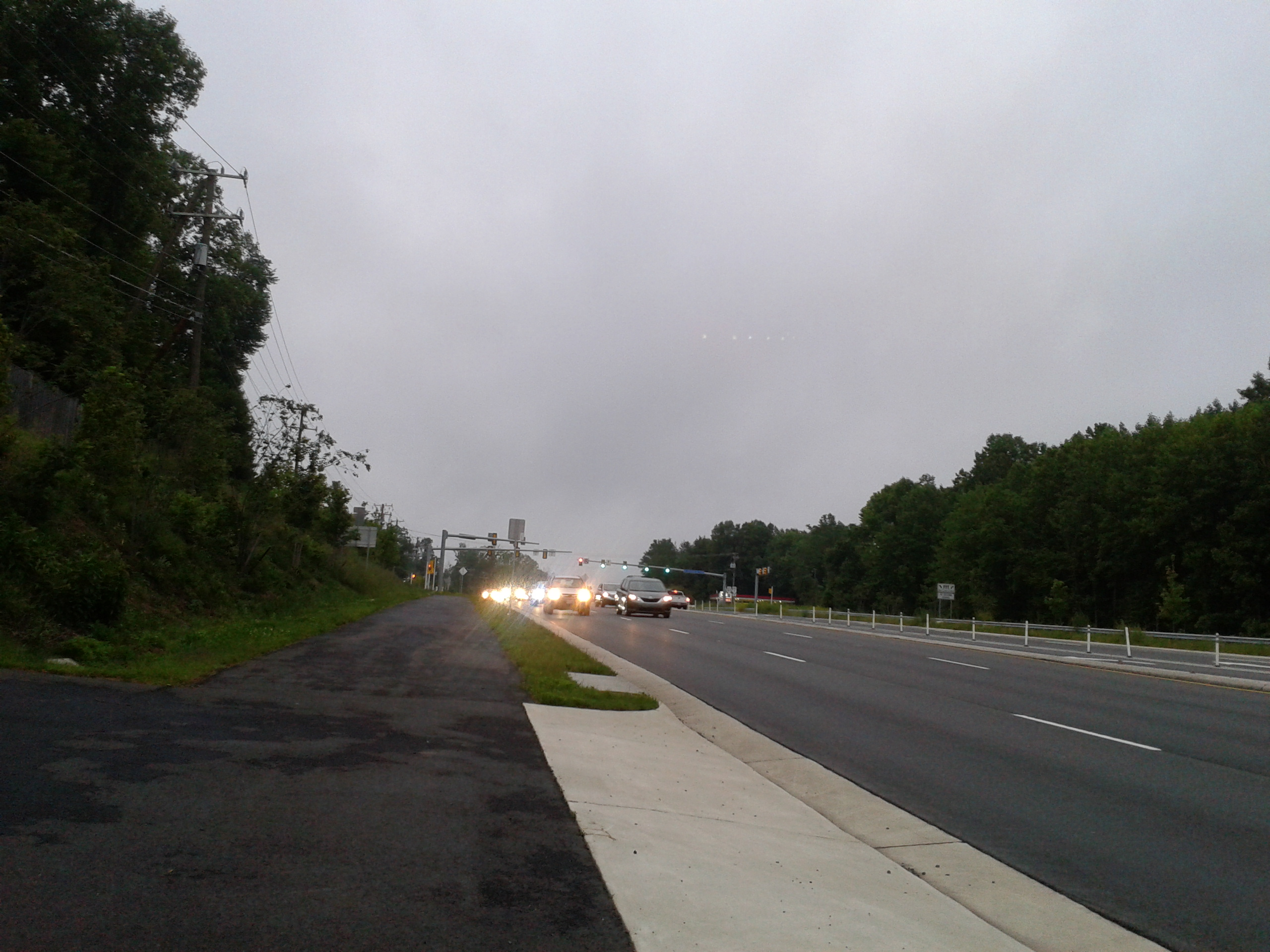
Approximate site of the battle, seen in 2017

Following the Battle of Ball's Bluff on October 21, major offensive action was halted in the eastern theater, as both armies went into winter quarters. Small detachments were still occasionally sent out to probe the enemy's position and to obtain forage. Such was the case early on the morning of December 20 when Stuart, with a mixed brigade of infantry comprising the regiments of the 6th South Carolina, 1st Kentucky, 10th Alabama, and 11th Virginia, 150 of his cavalry troopers and Allen S. Cutts's four-gun Georgia battery, set out north from their position near Centreville to escort the army's wagons trains on a foraging expedition into Loudoun County. Meanwhile, Ord, leading the 10,000 strong 3rd Brigade of Pennsylvania Reserves, set out west from Langley to clear the south bank of the Potomac River of Confederate pickets and partisans in Fairfax and Loudoun. At Colvin Run Mill, Ord left half his force to protect his rear and prevent his force from being cut off from their base at Langley.

== Opposing forces ==
=== Union ===
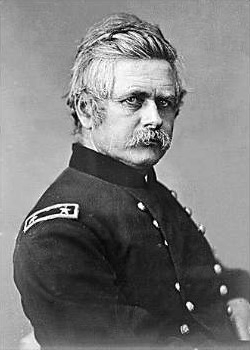
Brigadier General Edward O. C. Ord

Commander: Brigadier General Edward O. C. Ord
Regiments (Note: The 'dual names' of Pennsylvania Reserve Regiments are employed by Samuel P. Bates.)

- 6th Infantry, Pennsylvania Reserves (a.k.a. 35th Pennsylvania Volunteers): Lt. Col. William M. Penrose
- 9th Infantry, Pennsylvania Reserves (a.k.a. 38th Pennsylvania Volunteers): Col. Conrad Feger Jackson
- 10th Infantry, Pennsylvania Reserves (a.k.a. 39th Pennsylvania Volunteers): Col. John S. McCalmont
- 12th Infantry, Pennsylvania Reserves (a.k.a. 41st Pennsylvania Volunteers): Col. John H. Taggart
- Kane's 1st Pennsylvania Rifle Regiment (a.k.a. 42nd Pennsylvania Volunteers): Lt. Col.l Thomas L. Kane
- 1st Pennsylvania Reserve Cavalry (a.k.a. 44th Pennsylvania Volunteers): Lt. Col. Jacob C. Higgins
- 1st Pennsylvania Reserve Artillery (a.k.a. 43rd Pennsylvania Volunteers): Lt. Col. Charles T. Campbell
  - Battery A: Cpt. Hezekiah Easton
  - Battery F: Cpt. Ezra Matthews

=== Confederate ===
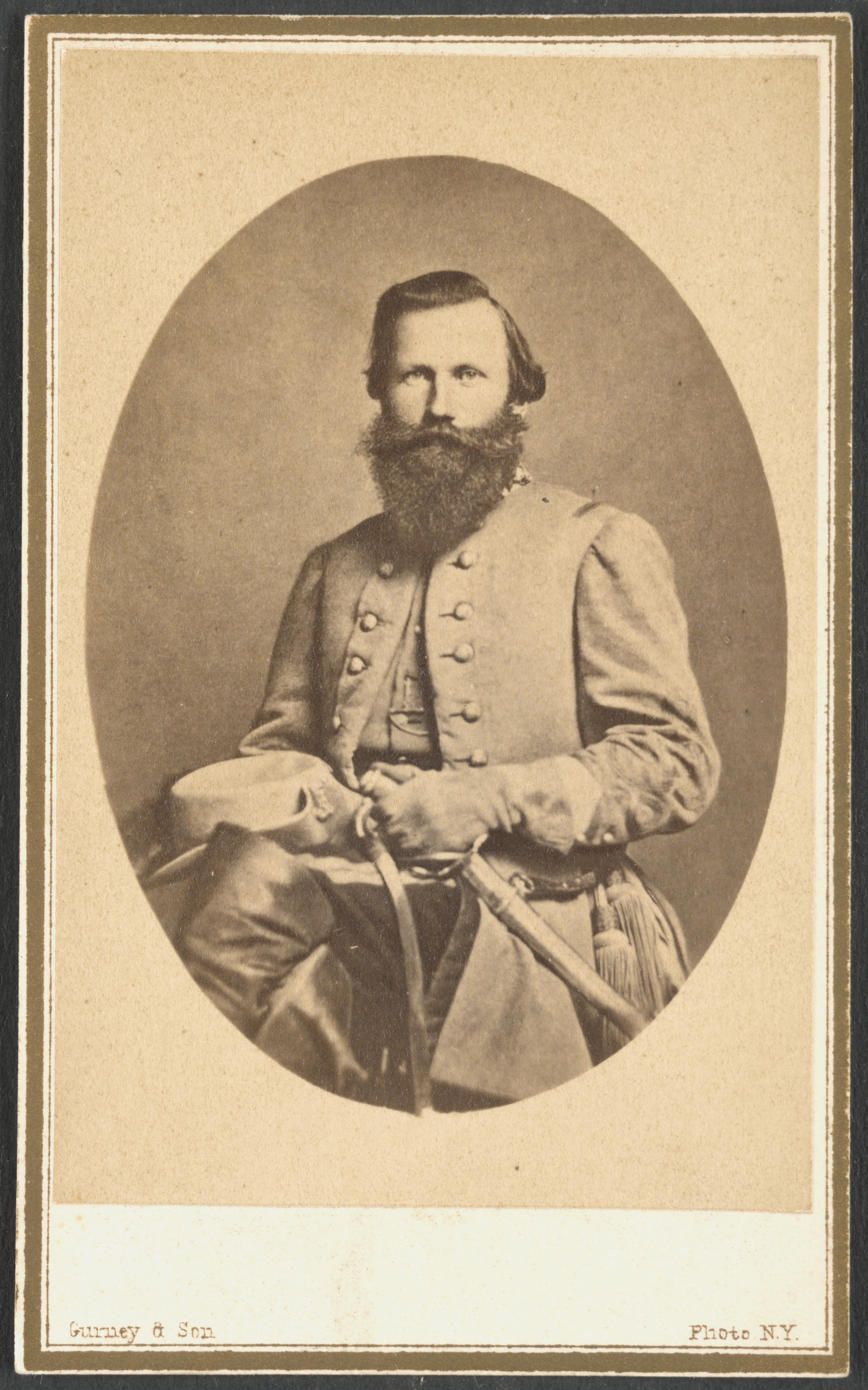
Brigadier General J. E. B. Stuart

Commander: Brigadier General J. E. B. Stuart
Regiments

- 11th Virginia Volunteers: Col. Samuel Garland, Jr.
- 6th South Carolina Volunteers: Lt. Col. Andrew J. Secrest
- 10th Alabama Volunteers: Col. John Horace Forney
- 1st Kentucky Volunteers: Col. Thomas Hart Taylor
- 1st North Carolina Cavalry (100 man detachment): Maj. James B. Gordon
- 2nd Virginia Cavalry, Company C: Cpt. Andrew L. Pitzer
- Sumter Flying Artillery (Georgia): Capt. Allen S. Cutts

== Battle ==
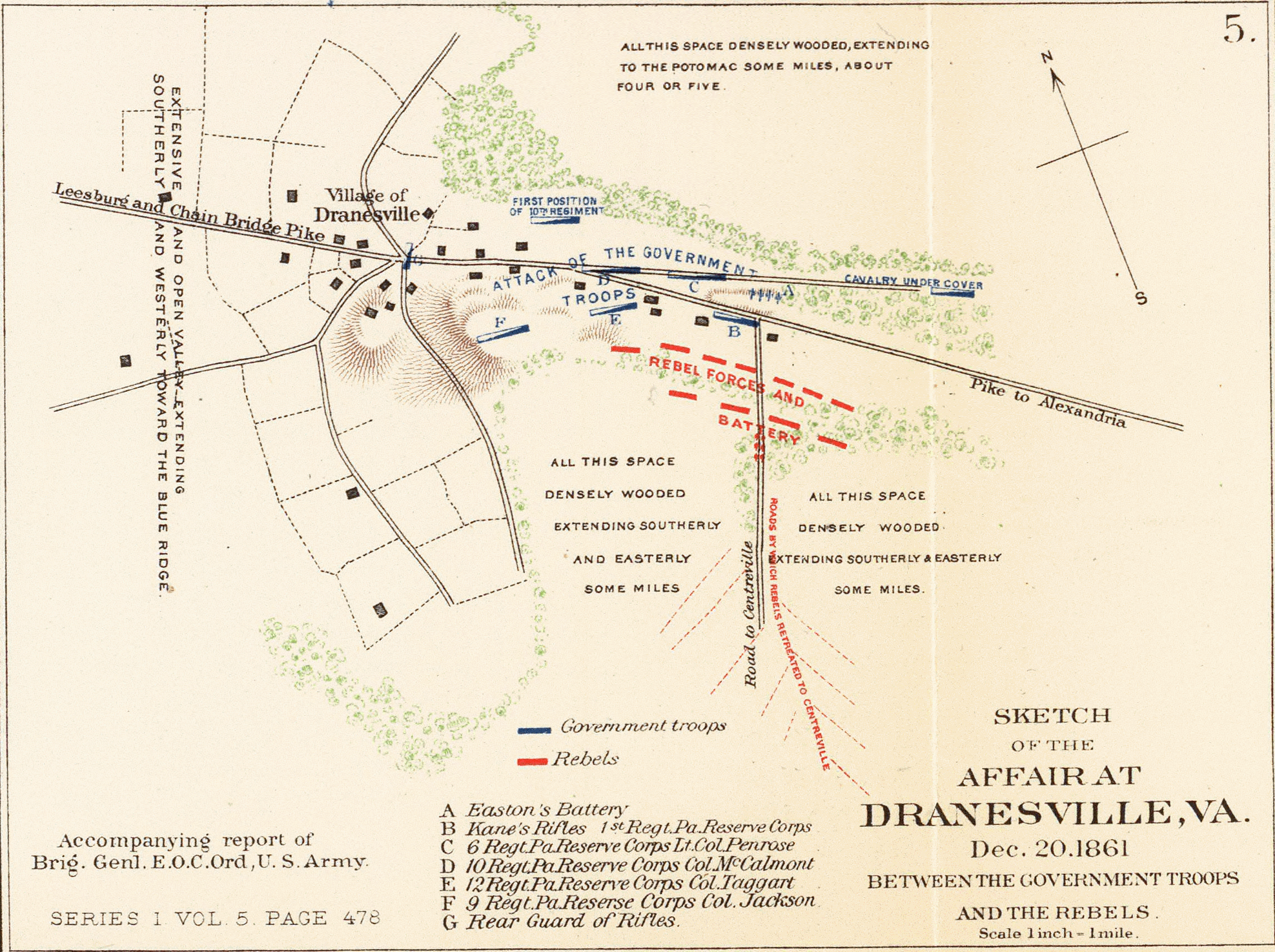
Sketch of the Affair at Dranesville, Va. Matz, Otto H., 1895

At about noon, Ord arrived at the intersection of the Georgetown Pike and Leesburg Pike in the village of Dranesville, where he encountered Stuart's advance cavalry pickets, which were quickly driven off by the Union force. Ord then began to lead his command west, down the Leesburg Pike. At around 1 p.m. Stuart, with the main body of his force approached Dranesville from the south, whereupon he encountered the rear of the Union detachment.

Ord halted his infantry and wheeled it around to meet the Confederate threat, forming a line on the north side of the Leesburg Pike. He then deployed his artillery on an eminence near the intersection. Stuart deployed his infantry on the south side of the pike and his artillery 300 yards (300 m) south of the federal position. While the Confederate infantry was deploying, the 1st Kentucky mistook the 6th South Carolina for Union troops and opened fire, which was quickly returned by the Carolinians. The 11th Virginia advanced, supported by the 10th Alabama but were stopped by heavy fire. The colonel of the 10th Alabama, John Forney, was wounded, and the lieutenant colonel, James B. Martin, was killed.

Hearing the sound of gunfire, the 9th Pennsylvania Reserve Regiment charged across the turnpike but were quickly driven back. The artillery then began to duel, but owing to the strength of the Union position, the Confederate guns were quickly knocked out. Ord deployed his infantry in a skirmish line and sent it across the Pike at Stuart and the two sides squared off for nearly 2 hours. At 3 p.m., with his wagons safely away and secure from capture, Stuart ordered a withdrawal. Ord pursued for a half mile, ensuring his line of retreat was safe, before breaking off the attack and returning to Langley.

The following day Stuart returned with reinforcements, but the battle was already over.

== Results ==
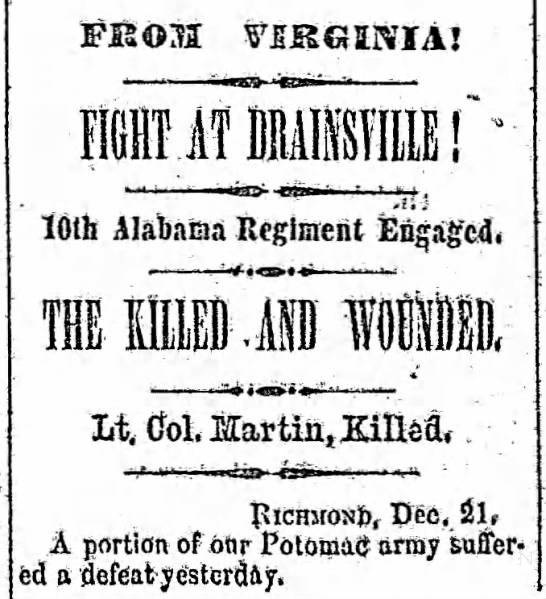
Report on the battle in the Democratic Watchtower, a pro-Confederacy newspaper based in Talladega, Alabama

Though the battle was small, of no strategic importance and resulted in only light casualties, it marked the first time in the east that a Union force had bested their Confederate enemy, inflicting 230 casualties while suffering only 71, and was able to drive them from the field.
