= 10th Alabama Infantry Regiment =

Infantry regiment of the Confederate States Army

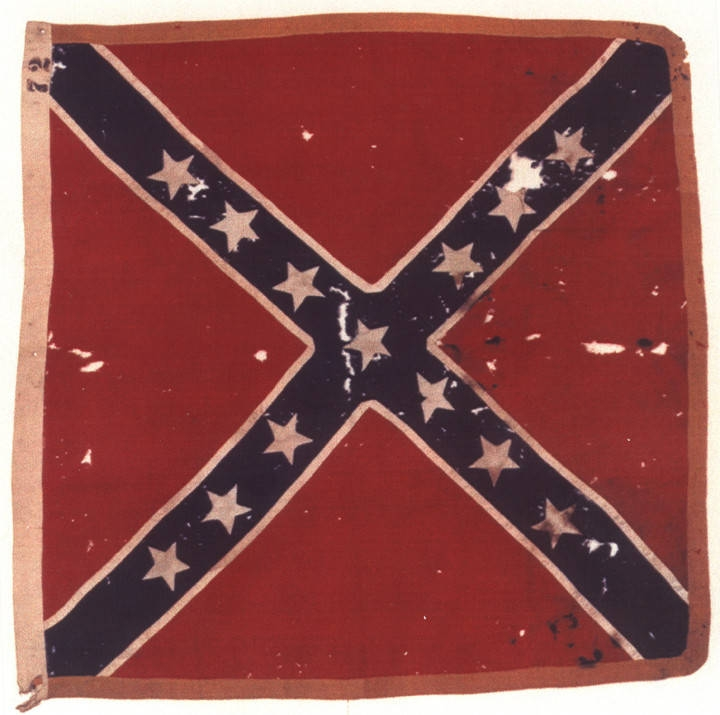
- Flag of the 10th Alabama
- Active: June 4, 1861 – April 1865
- Country: Confederate States of America
- Allegiance: Alabama
- Branch: Confederate States Army
- Type: Infantry
- Size: Regiment
- Nickname: Alexandria Rifles
- Engagements: American Civil War: Battle of Dranesville; Siege of Yorktown (1862); Battle of Williamsburg; Battle of Seven Pines; Battle of Gaines' Mill; Battle of White Oak Swamp; Second Battle of Bull Run; Battle of Antietam; Battle of Fredericksburg; Battle of Chancellorsville; Battle of Gettysburg; Battle of the Wilderness; Battle of Spotsylvania Court House; Battle of North Anna; Siege of Petersburg

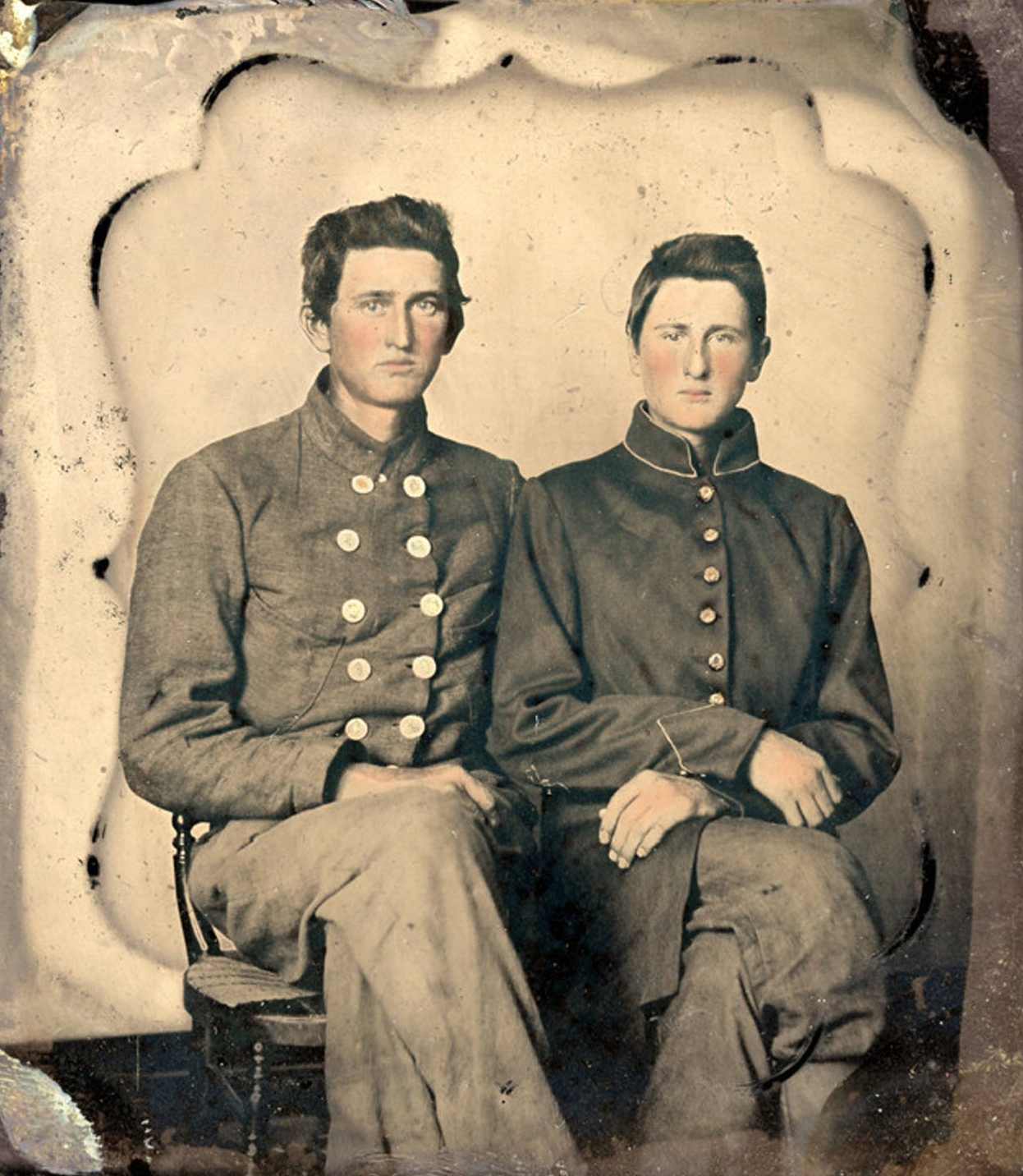
Charles W. and David Clinton Foust, two brothers in Company B of the 10th Alabama Infantry

The 10th Alabama Infantry Regiment was an infantry regiment that served in the Confederate Army during the American Civil War.

== Service ==
The 10th Alabama Infantry Regiment was mustered in at Montgomery, Alabama on June 4, 1861. The regiment surrendered at Appomattox Court House. The 10th mustered 1,429 men during its existence. It suffered approximately 300 killed in action or mortally wounded and 180 men who died of disease, for a total of approximately 470 fatalities. An additional 249 men were discharged or transferred from the regiment.

== Commanders ==
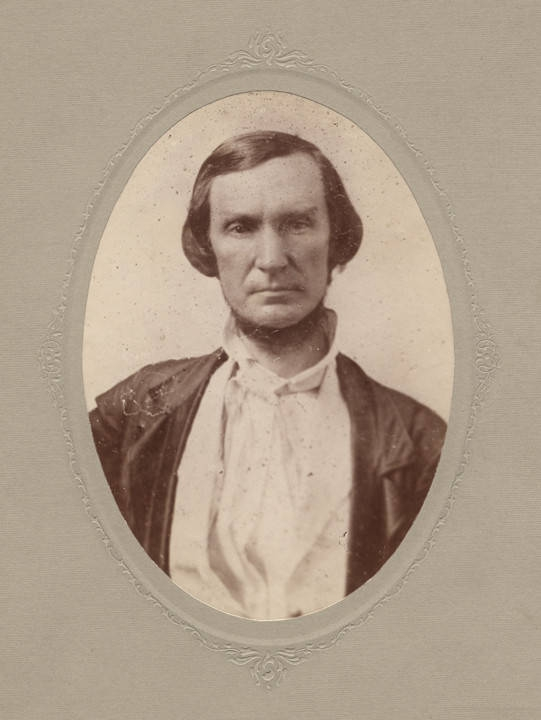
Colonel John Jefferson Woodward, commander of the 10th during 1862. He died at Gaines' Mill.

- Colonel John Horace Forney
- Colonel John Jefferson Woodward
- Colonel William Henry Forney
- Colonel William Thomas Smith

== See also ==
- List of Confederate units from Alabama
- Alabama in the American Civil War
