= Burwell Boykin Lewis =

American politician (1838–1885)

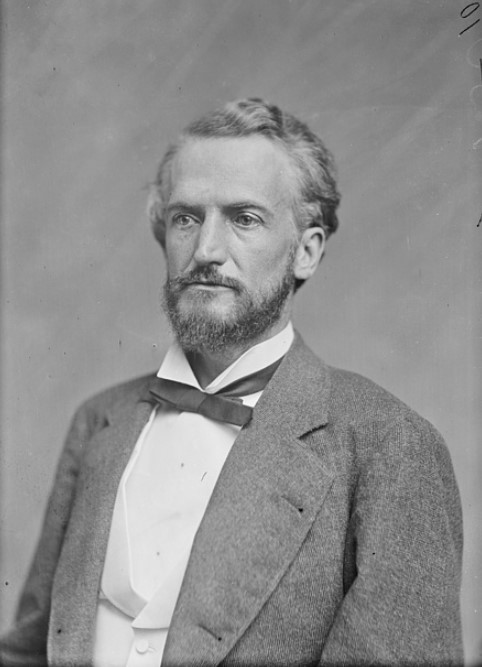

Member of the U.S. House of Representatives from Alabama's at-large district
- In office March 4, 1875 – March 3, 1877
- Preceded by: Alexander White
- Succeeded by: District inactive

Member of the U.S. House of Representatives from Alabama's 6th district
- In office March 4, 1879 – October 1, 1880
- Preceded by: Goldsmith W. Hewitt
- Succeeded by: Newton Nash Clements

Member of the Alabama House of Representatives
- In office 1870-1872

Personal details
- Born: John Crowell; July 7, 1838 Montgomery, Alabama
- Died: October 11, 1885 (aged 47) Tuscaloosa, Alabama

Burwell Boykin Lewis (July 7, 1838 – October 11, 1885) represented both Alabama's 6th congressional district and Alabama's at-large congressional district in the United States House of Representatives.

== Early life ==
Lewis was born in Montgomery, Alabama and soon moved, with his parents, to Mobile, Alabama. Both parents died while in Mobile and young Lewis went to Montevallo, Alabama in Shelby County, Alabama to live with an uncle. While there he attended private schools. Upon completion he moved to Tuscaloosa where he attended the University of Alabama. He next moved to Selma where he studied law. Lewis was admitted to the bar in 1859 and began to practice law in Montevallo. With the outbreak of the American Civil War Lewis enlisted in the Confederate States Army. He served with the Second Alabama Cavalry and attained the rank of captain.

== Political life ==
Lewis was elected to the Alabama House of Representatives from 1870 to 1872. He moved to Tuscaloosa where he engaged in business activities before being elected to an at-large seat in the United States House of Representatives in 1875. This seat was to represent the 8th congressional district which was first apportioned as a result of the 1880 census. He was an unsuccessful candidate for the 1876 election but was elected to the 6th congressional district in 1878. He began his service in March 1879 and served until October 1880 when he resigned to serve as the president of the University of Alabama in Tuscaloosa.

== Later life ==
Lewis served as president of the UA for just over five years until his death in Tuscaloosa, in 1885.

U.S. House of Representatives
Preceded by Alexander White	Member of the U.S. House of Representatives from Alabama's at-large congressional district 1875–1877	Succeeded by District inactive
Preceded by Goldsmith W. Hewitt	Member of the U.S. House of Representatives from Alabama's 6th congressional district 1879–1880	Succeeded by Newton N. Clements
