= William H. Forney =

American politician (1823–1894)

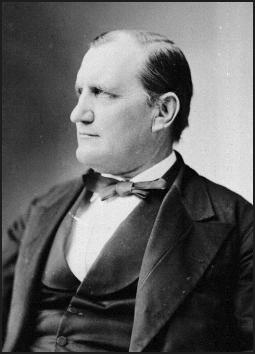

Member of the U.S. House of Representatives from Alabama
- In office March 4, 1875 – March 3, 1893
- Preceded by: Charles C. Sheats (AL); District established (7th)
- Succeeded by: District eliminated (AL); William H. Denson (7th)
- Constituency: At-large district (1875-77); 7th district (1877-93)

Member of the Alabama Senate
- In office 1865-1866

Personal details
- Born: William Henry Forney; November 9, 1823 Lincolnton, North Carolina
- Died: January 16, 1894 (aged 70) Jacksonville, Alabama
- Resting place: Jacksonville, AL
- Party: Democratic
- Profession: Lawyer

Military service
- Allegiance: Confederate States of America
- Branch/service: Confederate States Army
- Years of service: 1861 – 1865
- Rank: Brigadier General
- Unit: 10th Regiment Alabama Infantry
- Battles/wars: American Civil War

William Henry Forney (November 9, 1823 – January 16, 1894) was an Alabama legislator, a brigadier general in the Confederate States Army during the American Civil War and four-term U.S. representative from Alabama from March 4, 1875 to March 3, 1893.

== Early life ==
Forney was born in Lincolnton, North Carolina, on November 9, 1823. He moved with his parents to Alabama in 1835. He was the grandson of Peter Forney and nephew of David M. Forney. He was the older brother of Confederate Major General John Horace Forney, first cousin of Confederate Brigadier General Robert Daniel Johnston and second cousin of Confederate Major Generals Robert F. Hoke and Stephen Dodson Ramseur. Forney pursued an education in classical studies, and graduated from the University of Alabama at Tuscaloosa in 1844.

He served in the Mexican War as a first lieutenant in the First Regiment of Alabama Volunteers. Upon returning from the War, Forney studied law and was admitted to the bar in 1848 when he commenced practice in Jacksonville, Alabama.

Forney served as a Trustee of the University of Alabama from 1851 to 1860. In 1859 and 1860, Forney served as a member of the Alabama House of Representatives.

== Civil War ==
During the Civil War Forney entered the Confederate States Army in 1861 as a captain in the 10th Regiment Alabama Infantry, and was successively promoted to major on December 20, 1861, lieutenant colonel on March 17, 1862, and colonel on June 27, 1862. He was wounded in the leg at the Battle of Dranesville, Virginia, December 20, 1861. He was wounded in the right arm and captured at the Battle of Williamsburg on June 27, 1862. He was exchanged on August 31, 1862. He was wounded in the leg at the Battle of Salem Church on May 3, 1863.

He was left on the field at Gettysburg with multiple wounds, captured and remained a Union prisoner of war for more than a year from July 5, 1863 to August 4, 1864. Following his parole, on August 21, 1864, he was given command of a brigade in Major General William Mahone's division. Forney was promoted to brigadier general on February 15, 1865. He served as a brigade commander in Mahone's Division until the surrender at Appomattox on April 9, 1865. He was pardoned on July 11, 1866.

== Aftermath: Post-War career ==
After the War, Forney served as a member of the State senate in 1865 and 1866.

=== Congress ===
He was elected as a Democrat to the Forty-fourth and to the eight succeeding Congresses (March 4, 1875 – March 3, 1893). He served as chairman of the Committee on Expenditures in the Department of the Treasury (Forty-sixth Congress). He was not a candidate for renomination in 1892.

=== Later career and death ===
He was appointed by President Grover Cleveland to be a member of the Gettysburg Battlefield Commission and served until his death. Forney died in Jacksonville, Alabama, January 16, 1894 and was interred in City Cemetery, Jacksonville.

== See also ==
- List of American Civil War generals (Confederate)

== Notes ==
U.S. House of Representatives
Preceded by Charles C. Sheats	Member of the U.S. House of Representatives from Alabama's at-large congressional district 1875-1877	Succeeded by District inactive
Preceded by District re-established	Member of the U.S. House of Representatives from Alabama's 7th congressional district 1877–1893	Succeeded by William H. Denson
