= 1874–75 United States House of Representatives elections =

House elections for the 44th U.S. Congress

- November 3, 1874 (Note: The majority of states held their elections on this date. 13 other states held regular elections on different dates between June 1, 1874, and September 7, 1875.)

All 292 seats in the United States House of Representatives (Note: Includes late elections.) 147 seats needed for a majority
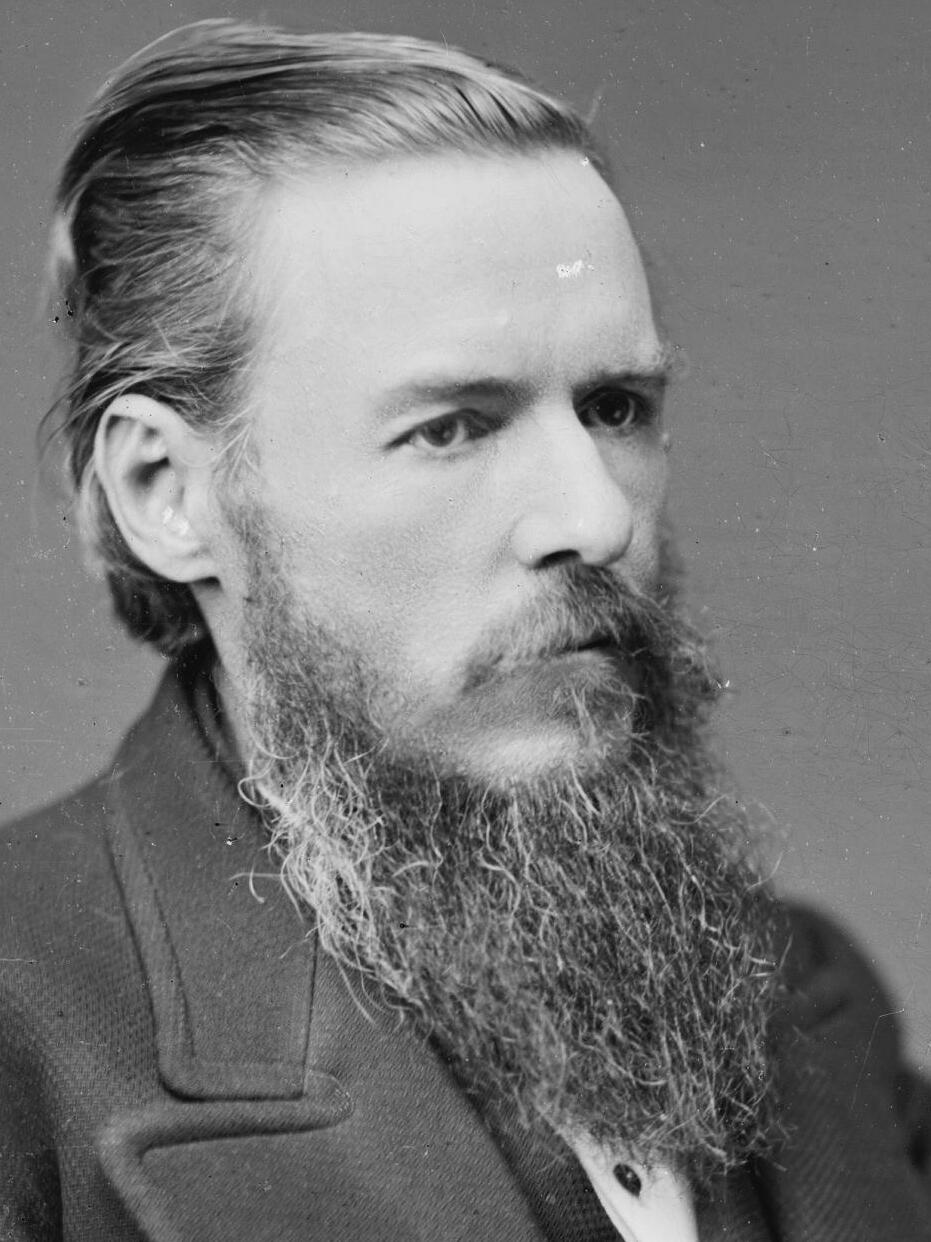

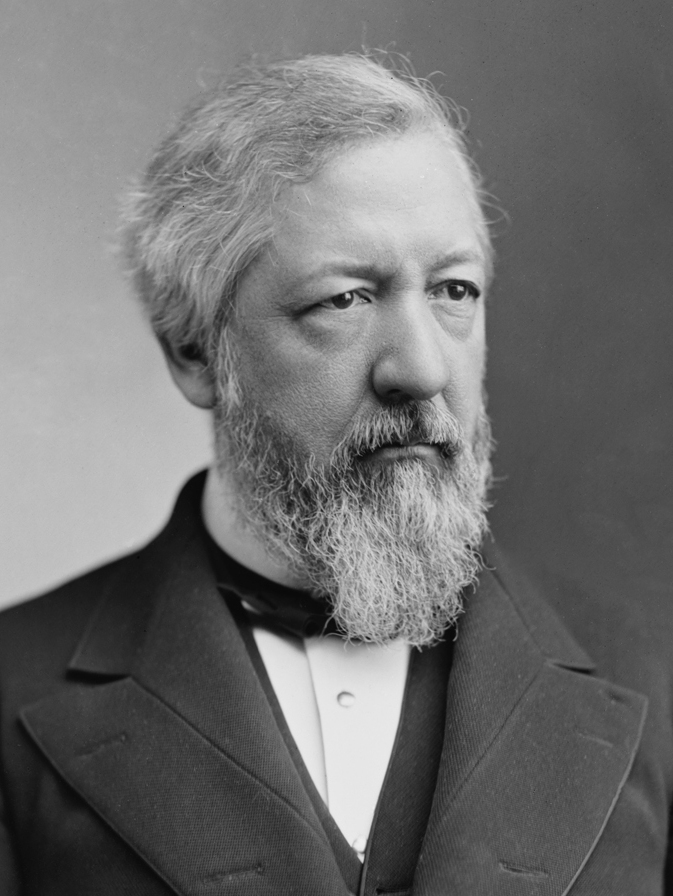
	Majority party	Minority party
Leader	Michael Kerr	James G. Blaine
Party	Democratic	Republican
Leader's seat	Indiana 3rd	Maine 3rd
Last election	88 seats	195 seats
Seats won	180	103
Seat change	▲92	▼92
Popular vote	3,061,888	2,766,257
Percentage	49.12%	44.38%
Swing	▲7.12pp	▼8.47pp
	Third party	Fourth party
Party	Anti-Monopoly	Reform
Last election	0 seats	0 seats
Seats won	1	1
Seat change	▲1	▲1
Popular vote	79,816	9,546
Percentage	1.28%	0.15%
Swing	New party	New party
	Fifth party
Party	Independent
Last election	1 seat (Note: Included 1 Independent Democrat.)
Seats won	4 (Note: Includes 3 Independent Republicans.) (Note: Includes 1 Independent Democrat, William H. Felton, elected to Georgia's 7th congressional district.)
Seat change	▲3
Popular vote	276,554
Percentage	4.44%
Swing	▲2.19pp
- Results: Democratic hold Democratic gain Republican hold Republican gain Independent hold
Speaker before election
James G. Blaine
Republican
Elected Speaker
Michael Kerr
Democratic

The 1874–75 United States House of Representatives elections were held on various dates in various states between June 1, 1874, and September 7, 1875. Each state set its own date for its elections to the House of Representatives before the first session of the 44th United States Congress convened on December 6, 1875. Elections were held for all 292 seats, representing 37 states.

These elections were held in the middle of President Ulysses S. Grant's second term with a deep economic depression underway. It was an important turning point, as the Republicans lost heavily and the Democrats gained control of the House. It signaled the imminent end of Reconstruction, which Democrats opposed. Historians emphasize the factors of economic depression and attacks on the Grant administration for corruption as key factors in the vote.

With the election following the Panic of 1873, Grant's Republican Party was crushed in the elections, losing their majority and almost half their seats to the Democratic Party. This was the first period of Democratic control since the prewar era. The economic crisis and the inability of Grant to find a solution led to his party's defeat. This was the second-largest swing in the history of the House (only behind the 1894 elections), and is the largest House loss in the history of the Republican Party.

In the south, the Democrats continued their systematic destruction of the Republican coalition. In the South, Scalawags moved into the Democratic Party. The Democratic landslide signaled the imminent end of Reconstruction, which Democrats opposed and a realignment of the Republican coalition that had dominated American politics since the late 1850s.

While the ongoing end of Reconstruction in the South was one of the main reasons for the shift, turn-of-the-century historian James Ford Rhodes explored the multiple causes of the results in the North:

In the fall elections of 1874 the issue was clearly defined: Did the Republican President Ulysses S. Grant and Congress deserve the confidence of the country? and the answer was unmistakably No ... The Democrats had won a signal victory, obtaining control of the next House of Representatives which would stand Democrats 168, Liberals and Independents 14, Republicans 108 as against the two-thirds Republican majority secured by the election of 1872. Since 1861 the Republicans had controlled the House and now with its loss came a decrease in their majority in the Senate ...

Rhodes continues:

The political revolution from 1872 to 1874 was due to the failure of the Southern policy of the Republican party, to the Credit Mobilier and Sanborn contract scandals, to corrupt and inefficient administration in many departments and to the persistent advocacy of Grant by some close friends and hangers-on for a third presidential term. Some among the opposition were influenced by the President's backsliding in the cause of civil service reform, and others by the failure of the Republican party to grapple successfully with the financial question. The depression, following the financial Panic of 1873, and the number of men consequently out of employment weighed in the scale against the party in power. In Ohio, the result was affected by the temperance crusade in the early part of the year. Bands of women of good social standing marched to saloons before which or in which they sang hymns and, kneeling down, prayed that the great evil of drink might be removed. Sympathizing men wrought with them in causing the strict law of the State against the sale of strong liquor to be rigidly enforced. Since Republicans were in the main the instigators of the movement, it alienated from their party a large portion of the German American vote.

== Special elections ==
- South Carolina 3: 1874
- Pennsylvania 23: 1874
- Massachusetts 1: 1875
- Oregon at-large: 1875
- Maine 4: 1875

== Election summaries ==
↓
182	8	103
Democratic	(Note: There were 4 Independents, 3 Independent Republicans, and 1 Independent Democrat.)	Republican

State	Type	Total seats	Democratic		Republican		Independent	
State	Type	Total seats	Seats	Change	Seats	Change	Seats	Change
Alabama	District + 2 at-large	8	6	▲4	2	▼4	0	Steady
Arkansas	District	4	4	▲4	0	▼4	0	Steady
California (Note: Elections held late.)	District	4	3	▲2	1	▼2	0	Steady
Connecticut	District	4	3	▲2	1	▼2	0	Steady
Delaware	At-large	1	1	▲1	0	▼1	0	Steady
Florida	District	2	1	▲1	1	▼1	0	Steady
Georgia (Note: Elections held early.)	District	9	9	▲2	0	▼2	0	Steady
Illinois	District	19	11	▲6	6	▼8	2	▲2
Indiana	District	13	8	▲5	5	▼5	0	Steady
Iowa	District	9	1	▲1	8	▼1	0	Steady
Kansas	District	3	1	▲1	2	▼1	0	Steady
Kentucky	District	10	9	▼1	1	▲1	0	Steady
Louisiana	District	6	4	▲3	2	▼2	0	Steady
Maine	District	5	0	Steady	5	Steady	0	Steady
Maryland	District	6	6	▲2	0	▼2	0	Steady
Massachusetts	District	11	5	▲5	4	▼7	2	▲2
Michigan	District	9	3	▲3	6	▼3	0	Steady
Minnesota	District	3	0	Steady	3	Steady	0	Steady
Mississippi	District	6	4	▲3	2 (Note: Includes 1 Independent Republican.)	▼3	0	Steady
Missouri	District	13	13	▲4	0	▼4	0	Steady
Nebraska	At-large	1	0	Steady	1	Steady	0	Steady
Nevada	At-large	1	0	▼1	1	▲1	0	Steady
New Hampshire	District	3	2	▲1	1	▼1	0	Steady
New Jersey	District	7	5	▲4	2	▼4	0	Steady
New York	District	33	17	▲8	16	▼8	0	Steady
North Carolina	District	8	7	▲2	1	▼2	0	Steady
Ohio	District	20	13	▲7	7	▼7	0	Steady
Oregon	At-large	1	1	▲1	0	▼1	0	Steady
Pennsylvania	District	27	17	▲12	10	▼12	0	Steady
Rhode Island	District	2	0	Steady	2	Steady	0	Steady
South Carolina	District	5	0	Steady	5	Steady	0	Steady
Tennessee	District	10	9	▲6	1	▼6	0	Steady
Texas	District	6	6	Steady	0	Steady	0	Steady
Vermont	District	3	0	Steady	3	Steady	0	Steady
Virginia	District	9	8	▲4	1	▼4	0	Steady
West Virginia	District	3	3	▲1	0	▼1	0	Steady
Wisconsin	District	8	3	▲1	5	▼1	0	Steady
Total		293	183 62.5%	▲94	105 36.2%	▼93	4 1.4%	▲4

Popular vote
Democratic	49.12%
Republican	44.38%
Anti-Monopoly	1.28%
Reform	0.15%
Independent	4.44%
Others	0.63%

House seats
Democratic	61.43%
Republican	35.15%
Anti-Monopoly	0.34%
Reform	0.34%
Independent	2.74%

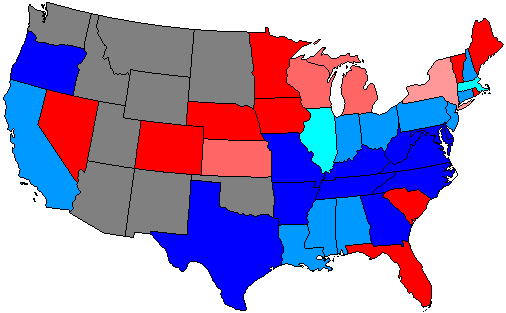
House seats by party holding plurality in state: 80+% Democratic / 80+% Republican; 60+% to 80% Democratic / 60+% to 80% Republican; Up to 60% Democratic / Up to 60% Republican

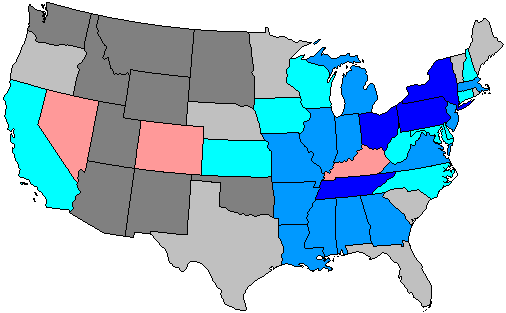
Net gain in party representation: 6+ Democratic gain / 6+ Republican gain; 3-5 Democratic gain / 3-5 Republican gain; 1-2 Democratic gain / 1-2 Republican gain; no net change

== Election dates ==
In 1845, Congress passed a law providing for a uniform nationwide date for choosing Presidential electors. This law did not affect election dates for Congress, which remained within the jurisdiction of State governments, but over time, the states moved their congressional elections to this date as well. In 1874–75, there were still 10 states with earlier election dates, and 3 states with later election dates:

- Early elections (1874):
  - June 1 Oregon
  - August 6 North Carolina
  - September 1 Vermont
  - September 14 Maine
  - October 7 Georgia
  - October 13 Indiana, Iowa, Nebraska, Ohio, West Virginia
- Late elections (1875):
  - March 9, 1875 New Hampshire
  - April 5, 1875 Connecticut
  - September 7, 1875 California

== Alabama ==
District	Incumbent			This race	
District	Member	Party	First elected	Results	Candidates
Alabama 1	Frederick G. Bromberg	Liberal Republican	1872	Incumbent lost re-election as a Democratic candidate. Republican gain.	▌ ✓ Jeremiah Haralson (Republican) 53.6%; ▌Frederick G. Bromberg (Democratic) 46.5%
Alabama 2	James T. Rapier	Republican	1872	Incumbent lost re-election. Democratic gain.	▌ ✓ Jeremiah Norman Williams (Democratic) 51.3%; ▌ James T. Rapier (Republican) 48.7%
Alabama 3	Charles Pelham	Republican	1872	Incumbent lost renomination. Democratic gain.	▌ ✓ Taul Bradford (Democratic) 58.0%; ▌ William H. Betts (Republican) 42.0%
Alabama 4	Charles Hays	Republican	1869	Incumbent re-elected.	▌ ✓ Charles Hays (Republican) 56.5%; ▌ James T. Jones (Democratic) 43.5%
Alabama 5	John Henry Caldwell	Democratic	1872	Incumbent re-elected.	▌ ✓ John Henry Caldwell (Democratic) 59.2%; ▌ James L. Sheffield (Republican) 40.8%
Alabama 6	Joseph Humphrey Sloss	Democratic	1870	Incumbent lost renomination and lost re-election as an Independent Democratic candidate. Democratic hold.	▌ ✓ Goldsmith W. Hewitt (Democratic) 62.1%; ▌ Joseph Humphrey Sloss (Independent Democratic) 37.9%
Alabama at-large	Charles Christopher Sheats	Republican	1872	Incumbent lost re-election. Democratic gain.	▌ ✓ William Henry Forney (Democratic) 54.1%; ▌ Charles Christopher Sheats (Republican) 46.0%
Alabama at-large	Alexander White	Republican	1872	Incumbent lost re-election. Democratic gain.	▌ ✓ Burwell Boykin Lewis (Democratic) 54.0%; ▌ Alexander White (Republican) 46.0%

== Arkansas ==
District	Incumbent			This race	
District	Member	Party	First elected	Results	Candidates
Arkansas 1	Asa Hodges	Republican	1872	Incumbent retired. Democratic gain.	▌ ✓ Lucien C. Gause (Democratic) 64.0%; ▌William H. Rogers (Republican) 36.0%
Arkansas 2	Oliver P. Snyder	Republican	1870	Incumbent retired. Democratic gain.	▌ ✓ William F. Slemons (Democratic) 53.7%; ▌John M. Clayton (Republican) 46.3%
Arkansas 3	William J. Hynes; Redistricted from the at-large district	Republican	1872	Incumbent lost re-election. Democratic gain.	▌ ✓ William W. Wilshire (Democratic) 65.0%; ▌William J. Hynes (Republican) 35.0%
Arkansas 4	Thomas M. Gunter; Redistricted from the 3rd district	Democratic	1872 (Note: Thomas M. Gunter lost election in 1872 to William W. Wilshire, contested the election and was seated June 1874.)	Incumbent re-elected.	▌ ✓ Thomas M. Gunter (Democratic) 90.8%; ▌Charles H. Lander (Republican) 9.2%

== Arizona Territory ==
See Non-voting delegates, below.

== California ==
District	Incumbent			This race	
District	Member	Party	First elected	Results	Candidates
California 1	Charles Clayton	Republican	1872	Incumbent retired. Democratic gain.	▌ ✓ William Adam Piper (Democratic) 49.1%; ▌Ira P. Rankin (Republican) 26.8%; ▌ John Franklin Swift (Independent) 24.1%
California 2	Horace F. Page	Republican	1872	Incumbent re-elected.	▌ ✓ Horace F. Page (Republican) 43.4%; ▌Henry Larkin (Democratic) 38.7%; ▌Charles A. Tuttle (Independent) 17.8%
California 3	John K. Luttrell	Democratic	1872	Incumbent re-elected.	▌ ✓ John K. Luttrell (Democratic) 46.7%; ▌C. B. Denio (Republican) 36.1%; ▌Charles F. Reed (Independent) 17.1%
California 4	Sherman O. Houghton	Republican	1871	Incumbent lost re-election. Democratic gain.	▌ ✓ Peter D. Wigginton (Democratic) 48.8%; ▌ Sherman Otis Houghton (Republican) 34.6%; ▌J. S. Thompson (Independent) 16.7%

== Colorado Territory ==
See Non-voting delegates, below.

== Connecticut ==
District	Incumbent			This race	
District	Member	Party	First elected	Results	Candidates
Connecticut 1	Joseph R. Hawley	Republican	1872 (special)	Incumbent lost re-election. Democratic gain.	▌ ✓ George M. Landers (Democratic); ▌Joseph R. Hawley (Republican); ▌Edwin B. Lyon (Prohibition)
Connecticut 2	Stephen Kellogg	Republican	1869	Incumbent lost re-election. Democratic gain.	▌ ✓ James Phelps (Democratic) 50.8%; ▌Stephen Kellogg (Republican) 45.9%; ▌Calvin S. Harrington (Prohibition) 2.1%
Connecticut 3	Henry H. Starkweather	Republican	1867	Incumbent re-elected	▌ ✓ Henry H. Starkweather (Republican) 49.4%; ▌Lafayette S. Foster (Democratic) 45.7%; ▌Elisha H. Palmer (Prohibition) 3.2%
Connecticut 4	William Barnum	Democratic	1867	Incumbent re-elected.	▌ ✓ William Barnum (Democratic) 53.8%; ▌Robert Hubbard (Republican) 43.3%; ▌Dwight M. Hodge (Prohibition) 2.3%

== Delaware ==
District	Incumbent			This race	
District	Member	Party	First elected	Results	Candidates
Delaware at-large	James R. Lofland	Republican	1872	Incumbent lost re-election. Democratic gain.	▌ ✓ James Williams (Democratic) 53.3%; ▌ James R. Lofland (Republican) 46.7%

== Florida ==
District	Incumbent			This race	
District	Member	Party	First elected	Results	Candidates
Florida 1	William J. Purman; Redistricted from the at-large district	Republican	1872	Incumbent re-elected.	▌ ✓ William J. Purman (Republican) 53.0%; ▌John Henderson (Democratic) 47.0%
Florida 2	Josiah T. Walls; Redistricted from the at-large district	Republican	1870	Incumbent re-elected.	▌ ✓ Josiah T. Walls (Republican) 51.1%; ▌Jesse J. Finley (Democratic) 48.9%
Florida 2	Josiah T. Walls; Redistricted from the at-large district	Republican	1870	Election successfully contested. New member seated April 19, 1876. Democratic gain.	▌ ✓ Jesse J. Finley (Democratic) 51.1%; ▌Josiah T. Walls (Republican) 48.9%

== Georgia ==
District	Incumbent			This race	
District	Member	Party	First elected	Results	Candidates
Georgia 1	Andrew Sloan	Republican	1872	Incumbent retired. Democratic gain.	▌ ✓ Julian Hartridge (Democratic) 59.4%; ▌ John E. Bryant (Republican) 35.5%; ▌ John Wimberley (Independent Republican) 5.1%
Georgia 2	Richard H. Whiteley	Republican	1870	Incumbent lost re-election. Democratic gain.	▌ ✓ William E. Smith (Democratic) 55.3%; ▌ Richard H. Whiteley (Republican) 44.7%
Georgia 3	Philip Cook	Democratic	1872	Incumbent re-elected.	▌ ✓ Philip Cook (Democratic) 67.4%; ▌ John Brown (Republican) 32.6%
Georgia 4	Henry R. Harris	Democratic	1872	Incumbent re-elected.	▌ ✓ Henry R. Harris (Democratic) 100.0%
Georgia 5	James C. Freeman	Republican	1872	Incumbent lost renomination. Democratic gain.	▌ ✓ Milton A. Candler (Democratic) 66.5%; ▌ [FNU] Mills (Republican) 33.5%
Georgia 6	James H. Blount	Democratic	1872	Incumbent re-elected.	▌ ✓ James H. Blount (Democratic) 78.4%; ▌ Samuel G. Gove (Republican) 21.6%
Georgia 7	Pierce M. B. Young	Democratic	1868	Incumbent lost renomination. Independent Democratic gain.	▌ ✓ William H. Felton (Independent Democratic) 49.6%; ▌ W. H. Dabney (Democratic) 49.1%; ▌ N. P. Harden (Republican) 1.3%
Georgia 8	Alexander H. Stephens	Democratic	1872	Incumbent re-elected.	▌ ✓ Alexander H. Stephens (Democratic) 99.8%
Georgia 9	Hiram Parks Bell	Democratic	1872	Incumbent retired. Winner died before start of term. Democratic hold.	▌ ✓ Garnett McMillan (Democratic) 77.3%; ▌ [FNU] O'Neal (Republican) 22.7%

== Idaho Territory ==
See Non-voting delegates, below.

== Illinois ==
District	Incumbent			This race	
District	Member	Party	First elected	Results	Candidates
Illinois 1	John Blake Rice	Republican	1872	Incumbent retired and then died. Winner also elected to finish term. Democratic gain.	▌ ✓ Bernard G. Caulfield (Democratic) 51.0%; ▌ Sidney Smith (Republican) 49.0%
Illinois 2	Jasper D. Ward	Republican	1872	Incumbent lost re-election. Democratic gain.	▌ ✓ Carter Harrison III (Democratic) 49.2%; ▌ Jasper D. Ward (Republican) 49.1%
Illinois 3	Charles B. Farwell	Republican	1870	Incumbent re-elected	▌ ✓ Charles B. Farwell (Republican) 50.1%; ▌ John V. Le Moyne (Democratic) 49.0%
Illinois 3	Charles B. Farwell	Republican	1870	Election successfully contested. New member seated May 6, 1876. Democratic gain.	▌ ✓ John V. Le Moyne (Democratic); ▌ Charles B. Farwell (Republican)
Illinois 4	Stephen A. Hurlbut	Republican	1872	Incumbent re-elected.	▌ ✓ Stephen A. Hurlbut (Republican) 53.3%; ▌ John F. Farnsworth (Democratic) 46.7%
Illinois 5	Horatio C. Burchard	Republican	1869	Incumbent re-elected.	▌ ✓ Horatio C. Burchard (Republican) 56.8%; ▌ David J. Pinkney (Democratic) 43.1%
Illinois 6	John B. Hawley	Republican	1868	Incumbent lost renomination. Republican hold.	▌ ✓ Thomas J. Henderson (Republican) 59.8%; ▌ Isaac H. Elliott (Democratic) 40.1%
Illinois 7	Franklin Corwin	Republican	1872	Incumbent lost re-election. Independent gain.	▌ ✓ Alexander Campbell (Independent) 56.6%; ▌ Franklin Corwin (Republican) 43.4%
Illinois 8	Greenbury L. Fort	Republican	1872	Incumbent re-elected.	▌ ✓ Greenbury L. Fort (Republican) 53.9%; ▌ J. G. Bayne (Democratic) 45.9%
Illinois 9	Granville Barrere	Republican	1872	Incumbent lost renomination. Republican hold.	▌ ✓ Richard H. Whiting (Republican) 50.7%; ▌ Leonard Fulton Ross (Independent) 49.3%
Illinois 10	William H. Ray	Republican	1872	Incumbent retired. Democratic gain.	▌ ✓ John C. Bagby (Democratic) 52.6%; ▌ Henderson Richey (Republican) 47.4%
Illinois 11	Robert M. Knapp	Democratic	1872	Incumbent lost renomination. Democratic hold.	▌ ✓ Scott Wike (Democratic) 59.2%; ▌ David Beatty (Republican) 38.2%
Illinois 12	James Carroll Robinson	Democratic	1870	Incumbent retired. Democratic hold.	▌ ✓ William M. Springer (Democratic) 48.1%; ▌ Andrew Simpson (Republican) 40.9%; ▌ Jonathan B. Turner (Independent Republican) 11.0%
Illinois 13	John McNulta	Republican	1872	Incumbent lost re-election. Democratic gain.	▌ ✓ Adlai Stevenson I (Democratic) 52.6%; ▌ John McNulta (Republican) 46.8%
Illinois 14	Joseph G. Cannon	Republican	1872	Incumbent re-elected.	▌ ✓ Joseph G. Cannon (Republican) 51.5%; ▌ James H. Pickrell (Democratic) 48.5%
Illinois 15	John R. Eden	Democratic	1872	Incumbent re-elected.	▌ ✓ John R. Eden (Democratic) 52.8%; ▌ Jacob W. Wilkin (Republican) 47.2%
Illinois 16	James Stewart Martin	Republican	1872	Incumbent lost re-election. Democratic gain.	▌ ✓ William A. J. Sparks (Democratic) 42.2%; ▌ James Stewart Martin (Republican) 38.4%; ▌ Rolla B. Henry (Independent Republican) 19.5%
Illinois 17	William R. Morrison	Democratic	1872	Incumbent re-elected.	▌ ✓ William R. Morrison (Democratic) 60.8%; ▌ John I. Rinaker (Republican) 39.2%
Illinois 18	Isaac Clements	Republican	1872	Incumbent lost re-election. Democratic gain.	▌ ✓ William Hartzell (Democratic) 53.9%; ▌ Isaac Clements (Republican) 46.1%
Illinois 19	Samuel S. Marshall	Democratic	1864	Incumbent lost re-election. Independent gain.	▌ ✓ William B. Anderson (Independent) 38.9%; ▌ Samuel S. Marshall (Democratic) 35.4%; ▌ Green B. Rainn (Republican) 25.7%

== Indiana ==
District	Incumbent			This race	
District	Member	Party	First elected	Results	Candidates
Indiana 1	None (new district)			New district. Democratic gain.	▌ ✓ Benoni S. Fuller (Democratic) 50.7%; ▌ William Heilman (Republican) 49.3%
Indiana 2	William E. Niblack; Redistricted from the 1st district.	Democratic	1864	Incumbent retired. Democratic hold.	▌ ✓ James D. Williams (Democratic) 64.6%; ▌ Emmett Ferguson (Republican) 33.7%; ▌ B. F. Rawlins (Independent) 1.7%
Indiana 3	Simeon K. Wolfe; Redistricted from the 2nd district.	Democratic	1872	Incumbent retired. Democratic hold.	▌ ✓ Michael C. Kerr (Democratic) 52.3%; ▌ James A. Cravens (Ind. Democratic/Republican) 47.7%
Indiana 4	None (new district)			New district. Democratic gain.	▌ ✓ Jeptha D. New (Democratic) 52.5%; ▌ W. J. Robinson (Republican) 47.5%
Indiana 5	William S. Holman; Redistricted from the 3rd district.	Democratic	1866	Incumbent re-elected.	▌ ✓ William S. Holman (Democratic) 55.1%; ▌ Benjamin F. Claypool (Republican) 44.9%
Indiana 6	Jeremiah M. Wilson; Redistricted from the 4th district.	Republican	1870	Incumbent retired. Republican hold.	▌ ✓ Milton S. Robinson (Republican) 44.0%; ▌ Edmund Johnson (Democratic) 42.4%; ▌ A. V. Pendleton (Independent) 13.7%
Indiana 7	John Coburn; Redistricted from the 5th district.	Republican	1866	Incumbent lost re-election. Democratic gain.	▌ ✓ Franklin Landers (Democratic) 50.9%; ▌ John Coburn (Republican) 49.2%
Indiana 8	Morton C. Hunter; Redistricted from the 6th district.	Republican	1872	Incumbent re-elected.	▌ ✓ Morton C. Hunter (Republican) 50.4%; ▌ H. J. Rice (Democratic) 49.6%
Indiana 9	Thomas J. Cason; Redistricted from the 7th district.	Republican	1872	Incumbent re-elected.	▌ ✓ Thomas J. Cason (Republican) 42.3%; ▌ Leander McClurg (Democratic) 40.9%; ▌ C. J. Bowles (Independent) 16.9%
Indiana 9	Godlove S. Orth; Redistricted from the at-large district.	Republican	1872	Incumbent retired. Republican loss.	▌ ✓ Thomas J. Cason (Republican) 42.3%; ▌ Leander McClurg (Democratic) 40.9%; ▌ C. J. Bowles (Independent) 16.9%
Indiana 10	Jasper Packard; Redistricted from the at-large district.	Republican	1868	Incumbent retired. Democratic gain.	▌ ✓ William S. Haymond (Democratic) 51.1%; ▌ William H. Calkins (Republican) 48.9%
Indiana 11	James Noble Tyner; Redistricted from the 8th district.	Republican	1868	Incumbent lost renomination. Republican hold.	▌ ✓ James L. Evans (Republican) 52.1%; ▌ J. D. Cox (Democratic) 47.9%
Indiana 12	John P. C. Shanks; Redistricted from the 9th district.	Republican	1866	Incumbent lost renomination. Democratic gain.	▌ ✓ Andrew H. Hamilton (Democratic) 53.2%; ▌ Robert S. Taylor (Republican) 46.9%
Indiana 12	Henry B. Sayler; Redistricted from the 10th district.	Republican	1872	Incumbent retired. Republican loss.	▌ ✓ Andrew H. Hamilton (Democratic) 53.2%; ▌ Robert S. Taylor (Republican) 46.9%
Indiana 13	William Williams; Redistricted from the at-large district.	Republican	1866	Incumbent retired. Republican hold.	▌ ✓ John Baker (Republican) 50.1%; ▌ Freeman Kelley (Democratic) 49.9%

== Iowa ==
District	Incumbent			This race	
District	Member	Party	First elected	Results	Candidates
Iowa 1	George W. McCrary	Republican	1868	Incumbent re-elected.	▌ ✓ George W. McCrary (Republican) 54.5%; ▌ Leroy G. Palmer (Democratic/Anti-Monopoly) 45.5%
Iowa 2	Aylett R. Cotton	Republican	1870	Incumbent lost renomination. Republican hold.	▌ ✓ John Q. Tufts (Republican) 51.6%; ▌ J. L. Sheean (Democratic/Anti-Monopoly) 48.4%
Iowa 3	William G. Donnan	Republican	1870	Incumbent retired. Democratic/Anti-Monopoly gain.	▌ ✓ Lucien L. Ainsworth (Democratic/Anti-Monopoly) 50.1%; ▌ Charles T. Granger (Republican) 49.8%
Iowa 4	Henry Otis Pratt	Republican	1872	Incumbent re-elected.	▌ ✓ Henry Otis Pratt (Republican) 60.4%; ▌ John Bowman (Democratic/Anti-Monopoly) 39.3%
Iowa 5	James Wilson	Republican	1872	Incumbent re-elected.	▌ ✓ James Wilson (Republican) 63.0%; ▌ James Wilkinson (Democratic/Anti-Monopoly) 37.0%
Iowa 6	William Loughridge	Republican	1872	Incumbent lost renomination. Republican hold.	▌ ✓ Ezekiel S. Sampson (Republican) 56.1%; ▌ Enoch N. Gates (Democratic/Anti-Monopoly) 43.8%
Iowa 7	John A. Kasson	Republican	1872	Incumbent re-elected.	▌ ✓ John A. Kasson (Republican) 55.2%; ▌ John D. Whitman (Democratic/Anti-Monopoly) 44.8%
Iowa 8	James W. McDill	Republican	1872	Incumbent re-elected.	▌ ✓ James W. McDill (Republican) 57.1%; ▌ Anson Rood (Democratic/Anti-Monopoly) 42.8%
Iowa 9	Jackson Orr	Republican	1870	Incumbent retired. Republican hold.	▌ ✓ S. Addison Oliver (Republican) 64.9%; ▌ Charles E. Whiting (Democratic/Anti-Monopoly) 35.0%

== Kansas ==
District	Incumbent			This race	
District	Member	Party	First elected	Results	Candidates
Kansas 1	William A. Phillips; Redistricted from the at-large district.	Republican	1872	Incumbent re-elected.	▌ ✓ William A. Phillips (Republican) 60.2%; ▌ Marcus J. Parrott (Democratic) 33.6%; ▌ N. Green (Independent) 6.2%
Kansas 2	Stephen A. Cobb; Redistricted from the at-large district.	Republican	1872	Incumbent lost re-election. Democratic gain.	▌ ✓ John R. Goodin (Democratic/Reform) 51.2%; ▌ Stephen A. Cobb (Republican) 48.7%
Kansas 2	David P. Lowe; Redistricted from the at-large district.	Republican	1870	Incumbent retired. Republican loss.	▌ ✓ John R. Goodin (Democratic/Reform) 51.2%; ▌ Stephen A. Cobb (Republican) 48.7%
Kansas 3	None (new district)			New district. Republican gain.	▌ ✓ William Ripley Brown (Republican) 59.3%; ▌ Joseph K. Hudson (Reform/Democratic) 40.4%

== Kentucky ==
District	Incumbent			This race	
District	Member	Party	First elected	Results	Candidates
Kentucky 1	Edward Crossland	Democratic	1870	Incumbent retired. Democratic hold.	▌ ✓ Andrew Boone (Democratic) 45.5%; ▌ Oscar Turner (Ind. Democratic) 44.8%; ▌ Thomas J. Pickett (Ind. Republican) 9.7%
Kentucky 2	John Y. Brown	Democratic	1872	Incumbent re-elected.	▌ ✓ John Y. Brown (Democratic) 61.3%; ▌ George Smith (Republican) 32.1%; ▌ Edward R. Weir (Ind. Republican) 6.6%
Kentucky 3	Charles W. Milliken	Democratic	1872	Incumbent re-elected.	▌ ✓ Charles W. Milliken (Democratic) 72.9%; ▌ Franklin Gorin (Republican) 22.1%; ▌ W. H. Butler (Ind. Republican) 4.9%
Kentucky 4	William B. Read	Democratic	1870	Incumbent lost renomination. Democratic hold.	▌ ✓ J. Proctor Knott (Democratic) 64.0%; ▌ Clement S. Hill (Ind. Republican) 36.0%
Kentucky 5	Elisha Standiford	Democratic	1872	Incumbent declined renomination. Democratic hold.	▌ ✓ Edward Y. Parsons (Democratic) 78.6%; ▌ John T. Gray (Ind. Republican) 15.7%; ▌ L. O. Wood (Independent) 5.7%
Kentucky 6	William Evans Arthur	Democratic	1870	Incumbent retired. Democratic hold.	▌ ✓ Thomas L. Jones (Democratic) 48.9%; ▌ Charles Eginton (Republican) 27.9%; ▌ Overton P. Hogan (Ind. Republican) 23.2%
Kentucky 7	James B. Beck	Democratic	1867	Incumbent retired. Democratic hold.	▌ ✓ J. C. S. Blackburn (Democratic) 69.1%; ▌ Edward C. Marshall (Independent) 30.9%
Kentucky 8	Milton J. Durham	Democratic	1872	Incumbent re-elected.	▌ ✓ Milton J. Durham (Democratic) 94.8%; ▌ J. L. McMurtry (Republican) 5.1%
Kentucky 9	George Madison Adams	Democratic	1867	Incumbent lost renomination. Republican gain.	▌ ✓ John D. White (Republican) 51.3%; ▌ Harrison Cockrell (Democratic) 47.6%; ▌ James C. Matherly (Independent) 1.1%
Kentucky 10	John Duncan Young	Democratic	1872	Incumbent retired. Democratic hold.	▌ ✓ John B. Clarke (Democratic) 58.9%; ▌ John Means (Republican) 40.0%

== Louisiana ==
District	Incumbent			This race	
District	Member	Party	First elected	Results	Candidates
Louisiana 1	J. Hale Sypher	Republican	1870	Incumbent lost re-election. Democratic gain.	▌ ✓ Randall L. Gibson (Democratic) 58.6%; ▌ J. Hale Sypher (Republican) 41.4%
Louisiana 2	Lionel Allen Sheldon	Republican	1868	Incumbent lost re-election. Democratic gain.	▌ ✓ E. John Ellis (Democratic) 55.8%; ▌ Lionel Allen Sheldon (Republican) 44.2%
Louisiana 3	Chester Bidwell Darrall	Republican	1868	Incumbent re-elected.	▌ ✓ Chester Bidwell Darrall (Republican) 52.7%; ▌ Joseph Arsenne Breaux (Democratic) 47.3%
Louisiana 4	George Luke Smith	Republican	1873	Incumbent lost re-election. Democratic gain.	▌ ✓ William M. Levy (Democratic) 60.8%; ▌ George Luke Smith (Republican) 39.2%
Louisiana 5	Frank Morey	Republican	1868	Incumbent re-elected.	▌ ✓ Frank Morey (Republican); ▌ William B. Spencer (Democratic)
Louisiana 5	Frank Morey	Republican	1868	Election successfully contested. New member seated June 8, 1876. Democratic gain.	▌ ✓ William B. Spencer (Democratic); ▌ Frank Morey (Republican)
Louisiana 6	None (new district)			New district. Republican gain.	▌ ✓ Charles E. Nash (Republican) 52.1%; ▌ Joseph M. Moore (Democratic) 47.9%

== Maine ==
District	Incumbent			This race	
District	Member	Party	First elected	Results	Candidates
Maine 1	John H. Burleigh	Republican	1872	Incumbent re-elected.	▌ ✓ John H. Burleigh (Republican) 53.2%; ▌ Bion Bradbury (Democratic) 46.8%
Maine 2	William P. Frye	Republican	1870	Incumbent re-elected.	▌ ✓ William P. Frye (Republican) 57.1%; ▌ Philo Clark (Democratic) 41.9%
Maine 3	James G. Blaine	Republican	1862	Incumbent re-elected.	▌ ✓ James G. Blaine (Republican) 56.8%; ▌ Edward K. O'Brien (Democratic) 43.0%
Maine 4	Samuel F. Hersey	Republican	1872	Incumbent re-elected but died before next term.	▌ ✓ Samuel F. Hersey (Republican) 58.8%; ▌ Gorham L. Boynton (Democratic) 40.9%
Maine 5	Eugene Hale	Republican	1868	Incumbent re-elected.	▌ ✓ Eugene Hale (Republican) 56.9%; ▌ Charles A. Spofford (Democratic) 43.1%

== Maryland ==
District	Incumbent			This race	
District	Member	Party	First elected	Results	Candidates
Maryland 1	Ephraim K. Wilson II	Democratic	1872	Incumbent retired. Democratic hold.	▌ ✓ Philip Francis Thomas (Democratic) 55.1%; ▌ H. H. Goldsborough, (Republican) 44.9%
Maryland 2	Stevenson Archer	Democratic	1866	Incumbent lost renomination. Democratic hold.	▌ ✓ Charles B. Roberts (Democratic) 56.5%; ▌ John T. Ensor (Republican) 43.5%
Maryland 3	William J. O'Brien	Democratic	1872	Incumbent re-elected.	▌ ✓ William J. O'Brien (Democratic) 65.7%; ▌ James S. Suter (Republican) 34.4%
Maryland 4	Thomas Swann	Democratic	1868	Incumbent re-elected.	▌ ✓ Thomas Swann (Democratic) 60.1%; ▌ John R. Cox (Republican) 39.9%
Maryland 5	William Albert	Republican	1872	Incumbent retired. Democratic gain.	▌ ✓ Eli J. Henkle (Democratic) 53.2%; ▌ [FNU] Hagner (Republican) 46.9%
Maryland 6	Lloyd Lowndes Jr.	Republican	1872	Incumbent lost re-election. Democratic gain.	▌ ✓ William Walsh (Democratic) 50.2%; ▌ Lloyd Lowndes Jr. (Republican) 49.9%

== Massachusetts ==
District	Incumbent			This race	
District	Member	Party	First elected	Results	Candidates
Massachusetts 1	James Buffinton	Republican	1868	Incumbent re-elected.	▌ ✓ James Buffinton (Republican) 68.88%; ▌Louis Lapham (Democratic) 28.94%; ▌Robert Carter Pitman (Independent) 2.19%
Massachusetts 2	Benjamin W. Harris	Republican	1872	Incumbent re-elected.	▌ ✓ Benjamin W. Harris (Republican) 59.07%; ▌Edward Avery (Democratic) 40.93%
Massachusetts 3	William Whiting II	Republican	1872	Incumbent retired. Republican hold.	▌ ✓ Henry L. Pierce (Republican) 61.92%; ▌Benjamin Dean (Democratic) 38.08%
Massachusetts 4	Samuel Hooper	Republican	1861 (special)	Incumbent retired. New member elected after initial result overturned. Democratic gain.	▌ ✓ Josiah Gardner Abbott (Democratic) 52.93%; ▌Rufus S. Frost (Republican) 47.07%
Massachusetts 5	Daniel W. Gooch	Republican	1872	Incumbent lost re-election. Independent gain.	▌ ✓ Nathaniel P. Banks (Independent) 64.92%; ▌Daniel W. Gooch (Republican) 35.09%
Massachusetts 6	Benjamin Butler	Republican	1866	Incumbent lost re-election. Democratic gain.	▌ ✓ Charles Perkins Thompson (Democratic) 52.94%; ▌Benjamin Butler (Republican) 47.06%
Massachusetts 7	Ebenezer R. Hoar	Republican	1872	Incumbent retired. Democratic gain.	▌ ✓ John K. Tarbox (Democratic) 54.77%; ▌James C. Ayer (Republican) 45.23%
Massachusetts 8	John M. S. Williams	Republican	1872	Incumbent lost re-election. Democratic gain.	▌ ✓ William W. Warren (Democratic) 52.20%; ▌John M. S. Williams (Republican) 47.80%
Massachusetts 9	George F. Hoar	Republican	1868	Incumbent re-elected.	▌ ✓ George F. Hoar (Republican) 51.26%; ▌Eli Thayer (Democratic) 48.74%
Massachusetts 10	Alvah Crocker	Republican	1872 (special)	Incumbent retired. Independent gain.	▌ ✓ Julius Hawley Seelye (Independent) 41.79%; ▌Charles A. Stevens (Republican) 39.53%; ▌Henry C. Hill (Democratic) 18.68%
Massachusetts 11	Henry L. Dawes	Republican	1856	Incumbent retired to run for U.S. Senate. Democratic gain.	▌ ✓ Chester W. Chapin (Democratic) 65.77%; ▌Henry Alexander (Republican) 34.23%

== Michigan ==
District	Incumbent			This race	
District	Member	Party	First elected	Results	Candidates
Michigan 1	Moses W. Field	Republican	1872	Incumbent lost re-election. Democratic gain.	▌ ✓ Alpheus S. Williams (Democratic) 54.8%; ▌ Moses W. Field (Republican) 44.9%; ▌ C. P. Russell (Prohibition) 0.3%
Michigan 2	Henry Waldron	Republican	1870	Incumbent re-elected.	▌ ✓ Henry Waldron (Republican) 52.8%; ▌ John J. Robison (Democratic) 47.2%
Michigan 3	George Willard	Republican	1872	Incumbent re-elected.	▌ ✓ George Willard (Republican) 50.5%; ▌ Fidus Livermore (Democratic) 45.9%; ▌ [FNU] Sagendorph (Prohibition) 3.6%
Michigan 4	Julius C. Burrows	Republican	1872	Incumbent lost re-election. Democratic gain.	▌ ✓ Allen Potter (Democratic) 52.0%; ▌ Julius C. Burrows (Republican) 48.0%
Michigan 5	William B. Williams	Republican	1873	Incumbent re-elected.	▌ ✓ William B. Williams (Republican) 51.5%; ▌ Mark D. Wilber (Democratic) 47.0%; ▌ J. A. McKay (Prohibition) 1.5%
Michigan 6	Josiah Begole	Republican	1872	Incumbent lost re-election. Democratic gain.	▌ ✓ George H. Durand (Democratic) 50.9%; ▌ Josiah Begole (Republican) 46.2%; ▌ [FNU] Harrington (Prohibition) 2.6%
Michigan 7	Omar D. Conger	Republican	1868	Incumbent re-elected.	▌ ✓ Omar D. Conger (Republican) 54.0%; ▌ Enos M. Goodrich (Democratic) 43.5%; ▌ H. Fish (Prohibition) 2.5%
Michigan 8	Nathan B. Bradley	Republican	1872	Incumbent re-elected.	▌ ✓ Nathan B. Bradley (Republican) 50.7%; ▌ George F. Lewis (Democratic) 49.3%
Michigan 9	Jay A. Hubbell	Republican	1872	Incumbent re-elected.	▌ ✓ Jay A. Hubbell (Republican) 78.8%; ▌ H. D. Noble (Democratic) 21.2%

== Minnesota ==
District	Incumbent			This race	
District	Member	Party	First elected	Results	Candidates
Minnesota 1	Mark H. Dunnell	Republican	1870	Incumbent re-elected.	▌ ✓ Mark H. Dunnell (Republican) 54.9%; ▌ Franklin H. Waite (Democratic) 45.1%
Minnesota 2	Horace B. Strait	Republican	1872	Incumbent re-elected.	▌ ✓ Horace B. Strait (Republican) 50.4%; ▌ Eugene Saint Julien Cox (Democratic) 49.6%
Minnesota 3	John T. Averill	Republican	1870	Incumbent retired. Republican hold.	▌ ✓ William S. King (Republican) 53.4%; ▌ Eugene M. Wilson (Democratic) 46.6%

== Mississippi ==
District	Incumbent			This race	
District	Member	Party	First elected	Results	Candidates
Mississippi 1	Lucius Q. C. Lamar	Democratic	1872	Incumbent re-elected.	▌ ✓ Lucius Q. C. Lamar (Democratic) 100%
Mississippi 2	Albert R. Howe	Republican	1872	Incumbent lost re-election. Independent Republican gain.	▌ ✓ G. Wiley Wells (Ind. Republican) 59.42%; ▌Albert R. Howe (Republican) 40.59%
Mississippi 3	Henry W. Barry	Republican	1869	Incumbent retired. Democratic gain.	▌ ✓ Hernando Money (Democratic) 68.10%; ▌Ridgley C. Powers (Republican) 31.90%
Mississippi 4	Jason Niles	Republican	1872	Incumbent lost re-election. Democratic gain.	▌ ✓ Otho R. Singleton (Democratic) 66.57%; ▌Jason Niles (Republican) 33.43%
Mississippi 5	George C. McKee	Republican	1869	Incumbent retired. Democratic gain.	▌ ✓ Charles E. Hooker (Democratic) 59.91%; ▌James Hill (Republican) 40.09%
Mississippi 6	John R. Lynch	Republican	1872	Incumbent re-elected.	▌ ✓ John R. Lynch (Republican) 50.53%; ▌Roderick Seal (Democratic) 49.47%

== Missouri ==
District	Incumbent			This race	
District	Member	Party	First elected	Results	Candidates
Missouri 1	Edwin O. Stanard	Republican	1872	Incumbent lost re-election. Democratic gain.	▌ ✓ Edward C. Kehr (Democratic) 51.0%; ▌ Edwin O. Stanard (Republican) 49.0%
Missouri 2	Erastus Wells	Democratic	1868	Incumbent re-elected.	▌ ✓ Erastus Wells (Democratic) 71.5%; ▌ Daniel F. Fisher (Republican) 28.5%
Missouri 3	William Henry Stone	Democratic	1872	Incumbent re-elected.	▌ ✓ William Henry Stone (Democratic) 56.7%; ▌ Robert F. Wingate (Republican) 43.3%
Missouri 4	Robert A. Hatcher	Democratic	1872	Incumbent re-elected.	▌ ✓ Robert A. Hatcher (Democratic) 100.0%
Missouri 5	Richard P. Bland	Democratic	1872	Incumbent re-elected.	▌ ✓ Richard P. Bland (Democratic) 56.0%; ▌ Abraham Jefferson Seay (Republican) 44.0%
Missouri 6	Harrison E. Havens	Republican	1870	Incumbent lost renomination. Democratic gain.	▌ ✓ Charles H. Morgan (Democratic) 54.7%; ▌ Charles W. Thrasher (Republican) 45.3%
Missouri 7	Thomas Theodore Crittenden	Democratic	1872	Incumbent retired. Democratic hold.	▌ ✓ John Finis Philips (Democratic) 88.8%; ▌ James H. Lay (People's) 11.3%
Missouri 8	Abram Comingo	Democratic	1870	Incumbent retired. Democratic hold.	▌ ✓ Benjamin J. Franklin (Democratic) 63.9%; ▌ Jesse P. Alexander (Independent) 19.9%; ▌ W. H. Powell (Republican) 16.2%
Missouri 9	Isaac C. Parker	Republican	1870	Incumbent retired. Democratic gain.	▌ ✓ David Rea (Democratic) 55.5%; ▌ Philip A. Thompson (Republican) 44.5%
Missouri 10	Ira B. Hyde	Republican	1872	Incumbent lost re-election. Democratic gain.	▌ ✓ Rezin A. De Bolt (Democratic) 50.5%; ▌ Ira B. Hyde (Republican) 49.5%
Missouri 11	John B. Clark Jr.	Democratic	1872	Incumbent re-elected.	▌ ✓ John B. Clark Jr. (Democratic) 100.0%
Missouri 12	John M. Glover	Democratic	1872	Incumbent re-elected.	▌ ✓ John M. Glover (Democratic) 57.9%; ▌ Henry S. Lipscomb (Independent) 42.1%
Missouri 13	Aylett H. Buckner	Democratic	1872	Incumbent re-elected.	▌ ✓ Aylett H. Buckner (Democratic) 76.1%; ▌ Francis Krekel (Republican) 23.9%

== Montana Territory ==
See Non-voting delegates, below.

== Nebraska ==
District	Incumbent			This race	
District	Member	Party	First elected	Results	Candidates
Nebraska at-large	Lorenzo Crounse	Republican	1872	Incumbent re-elected.	▌ ✓ Lorenzo Crounse (Republican) 62.70%; ▌James W. Savage (Democratic) 23.26%; ▌James W. Davis (Independent) 11.34%; ▌James G. Miller (Prohibition) 2.71%

== Nevada ==
District	Incumbent			This race	
District	Member	Party	First elected	Results	Candidates
Nevada at-large	Charles West Kendall	Democratic	1870	Incumbent retired. Republican gain.	▌ ✓ William Woodburn (Republican) 52.1%; ▌ A. C. Ellis (Democratic) 47.9%

== New Hampshire ==
District	Incumbent			This race	
District	Member	Party	First elected	Results	Candidates
New Hampshire 1	William B. Small	Republican	1873	Incumbent retired. Democratic gain.	▌ ✓ Frank Jones (Democratic) 50.0%; ▌ Charles S. Whitehouse (Republican) 48.8%
New Hampshire 2	Austin F. Pike	Republican	1873	Incumbent lost re-election. Democratic gain.	▌ ✓ Samuel Newell Bell (Democratic) 49.9%; ▌ Austin F. Pike (Republican) 49.3%
New Hampshire 3	Hosea W. Parker	Democratic	1871	Incumbent lost renomination. Republican gain.	▌ ✓ Henry W. Blair (Republican) 50.1%; ▌ Henry O. Kent (Democratic) 49.3%

== New Jersey ==
District	Incumbent			This race	
District	Member	Party	First elected	Results	Candidates
New Jersey 1	John W. Hazelton	Republican	1870	Incumbent lost renomination. Republican hold.	▌ ✓ Clement H. Sinnickson (Republican) 52.2%; ▌ C. Albertson (Democratic) 47.8%
New Jersey 2	Samuel A. Dobbins	Republican	1872	Incumbent re-elected.	▌ ✓ Samuel A. Dobbins (Republican) 51.8%; ▌ A. J. Smith (Democratic) 48.2%
New Jersey 3	Amos Clark Jr.	Republican	1872	Incumbent lost re-election. Democratic gain.	▌ ✓ Miles Ross (Democratic) 53.5%; ▌ Amos Clark Jr. (Republican) 46.5%
New Jersey 4	Robert Hamilton	Democratic	1872	Incumbent re-elected.	▌ ✓ Robert Hamilton (Democratic) 59.5%; ▌ Charles Place (Republican) 40.5%
New Jersey 5	William Walter Phelps	Republican	1872	Incumbent lost re-election. Democratic gain.	▌ ✓ Augustus W. Cutler (Democratic) 50.0%; ▌ William Walter Phelps (Republican) 50.0%
New Jersey 6	Marcus Lawrence Ward	Republican	1872	Incumbent lost re-election. Democratic gain.	▌ ✓ Frederick H. Teese (Democratic) 50.2%; ▌ Marcus Lawrence Ward (Republican) 49.8%
New Jersey 7	Isaac W. Scudder	Republican	1872	Incumbent lost re-election. Democratic gain.	▌ ✓ Augustus A. Hardenbergh (Democratic) 61.5%; ▌ Isaac W. Scudder (Republican) 38.5%

== New Mexico Territory ==
See Non-voting delegates, below.

== New York ==
District	Incumbent			This race	
District	Member	Party	First elected	Results	Candidates
New York 1	Henry J. Scudder	Republican	1872	Incumbent retired. Democratic gain.	▌ ✓ Henry B. Metcalfe (Democratic) 52.6%; ▌ Stephen B. French (Republican) 47.5%
New York 2	John G. Schumaker	Democratic	1872	Incumbent re-elected.	▌ ✓ John G. Schumaker (Democratic) 69.5%; ▌ Edward T. Wood (Republican) 30.6%
New York 3	Stewart L. Woodford	Republican	1872	Incumbent resigned. Winner also elected to finish term. Independent Republican gain.	▌ ✓ Simeon B. Chittenden (Ind. Republican/Democratic) 61.8%; ▌ Peter W. Ostrander (Republican) 38.2%
New York 4	Philip S. Crooke	Republican	1872	Incumbent retired. Democratic gain.	▌ ✓ Archibald M. Bliss (Democratic) 61.3%; ▌ George C. Bennett (Republican) 38.7%
New York 5	William R. Roberts	Democratic	1870	Incumbent retired. Democratic hold.	▌ ✓ Edwin R. Meade (Democratic) 50.5%; ▌ Edward Hogan (Ind. Democratic/Republican) 49.5%
New York 6	Samuel S. Cox	Democratic	1873	Incumbent re-elected.	▌ ✓ Samuel S. Cox (Democratic) 80.1%; ▌ James H. Campbell (Republican) 19.9%
New York 7	Thomas J. Creamer	Democratic	1872	Incumbent retired. Democratic hold.	▌ ✓ Smith Ely Jr. (Democratic) 54.5%; ▌ Charles E. Spencer (Republican) 45.5%
New York 8	John D. Lawson	Republican	1872	Incumbent lost re-election. Democratic gain.	▌ ✓ Elijah Ward (Democratic) 52.3%; ▌ John D. Lawson (Republican) 47.7%
New York 9	Fernando Wood; Redistricted from the 10th district.	Democratic	1866	Incumbent re-elected.	▌ ✓ Fernando Wood (Democratic) 50.6%; ▌ John Hardy (Ind. Democratic) 37.1%; ▌ Robert S. Newton (Republican) 12.3%
New York 9	David B. Mellish	Republican	1872	Incumbent died. Republican loss.	▌ ✓ Fernando Wood (Democratic) 50.6%; ▌ John Hardy (Ind. Democratic) 37.1%; ▌ Robert S. Newton (Republican) 12.3%
New York 10	None (new district)			New district. Democratic gain.	▌ ✓ Abram Hewitt (Democratic) 54.0%; ▌ James O'Brien (Ind. Democratic) 46.0%
New York 11	None (new district)			New district. Democratic gain.	▌ ✓ Benjamin A. Willis (Democratic) 56.3%; ▌ Isaac H. Bailey (Republican) 43.7%
New York 12	Clarkson Nott Potter; Redistricted from the 11th district.	Democratic	1868	Incumbent retired. Democratic hold.	▌ ✓ Nathaniel H. Odell (Democratic) 58.2%; ▌ Amherst Wright (Republican) 40.4%; ▌ William H. Van Cott (Prohibition) 1.4%
New York 13	John O. Whitehouse	Democratic	1872	Incumbent re-elected.	▌ ✓ John O. Whitehouse (Democratic) 57.2%; ▌ Charles A. Beal (Republican) 40.1%; ▌ Walter J. Farrington (Prohibition) 2.7%
New York 14	Charles St. John; Redistricted from the 12th district.	Republican	1870	Incumbent retired. Democratic gain.	▌ ✓ George M. Beebe (Democratic) 56.4%; ▌ Charles J. Everett (Republican) 43.6%
New York 15	David M. De Witt; Redistricted from the 14th district.	Democratic	1872	Incumbent retired. Democratic hold.	▌ ✓ John H. Bagley Jr. (Democratic) 56.1%; ▌ Seymour L. Stebbins (Republican) 43.9%
New York 16	Eli Perry; Redistricted from the 15th district.	Democratic	1870	Incumbent lost renomination and lost re-election as an Independent Democratic candidate. Republican gain.	▌ ✓ Charles H. Adams (Republican) 44.1%; ▌ Terence J. Quinn (Democratic) 34.6%; ▌ Eli Perry (Ind. Democratic) 21.3%
New York 16	Lyman Tremain; Redistricted from the at-large seat.	Republican	1872	Incumbent retired. Republican loss.	▌ ✓ Charles H. Adams (Republican) 44.1%; ▌ Terence J. Quinn (Democratic) 34.6%; ▌ Eli Perry (Ind. Democratic) 21.3%
New York 17	James S. Smart; Redistricted from the 16th district.	Republican	1872	Incumbent retired. Republican hold.	▌ ✓ Martin I. Townsend (Republican) 50.9%; ▌ Charles Hughes (Democratic) 49.2%
New York 18	Robert S. Hale; Redistricted from the 17th district.	Republican	1872	Incumbent retired. Republican hold.	▌ ✓ Andrew Williams (Republican) 57.4%; ▌ Artemus B. Waldo (Democratic) 42.6%
New York 19	William A. Wheeler; Redistricted from the 18th district.	Republican	1868	Incumbent re-elected.	▌ ✓ William A. Wheeler (Republican) 68.9%; ▌ William H. Sawyer (Democratic) 31.1%
New York 20	Henry H. Hathorn; Redistricted from the 19th district.	Republican	1872	Incumbent re-elected.	▌ ✓ Henry H. Hathorn (Republican) 51.2%; ▌ Walter T. L. Sanders (Democratic) 48.8%
New York 21	David Wilber; Redistricted from the 20th district.	Republican	1872	Incumbent retired. Republican hold.	▌ ✓ Samuel F. Miller (Republican) 51.9%; ▌ Orson M. Allaben (Democratic) 48.1%
New York 22	Clinton L. Merriam; Redistricted from the 21st district.	Republican	1870	Incumbent retired. Republican hold.	▌ ✓ George A. Bagley (Republican) 52.1%; ▌ Martin L. Graves (Democratic) 48.0%
New York 23	Ellis H. Roberts; Redistricted from the 22nd district.	Republican	1870	Incumbent lost re-election. Democratic gain.	▌ ✓ Scott Lord (Democratic) 52.3%; ▌ Ellis H. Roberts (Republican) 46.0%; ▌ Richard E. Sutton (Prohibition) 1.7%
New York 24	William E. Lansing; Redistricted from the 23rd district.	Republican	1870	Incumbent retired. Republican hold.	▌ ✓ William H. Baker (Republican) 52.2%; ▌ Andrew S. Warner (Democratic) 47.8%
New York 25	R. Holland Duell; Redistricted from the 24th district.	Republican	1870	Incumbent retired. Republican hold.	▌ ✓ Elias W. Leavenworth (Republican) 57.3%; ▌ George F. Comstock (Democratic) 42.7%
New York 26	Clinton D. MacDougall; Redistricted from the 25th district.	Republican	1872	Incumbent re-elected.	▌ ✓ Clinton D. MacDougall (Republican) 53.1%; ▌ Jacob Wilson (Democratic) 46.9%
New York 27	William H. Lamport; Redistricted from the 26th district.	Republican	1870	Incumbent retired. Republican hold.	▌ ✓ Elbridge G. Lapham (Republican) 49.7%; ▌ David A. Pierpont (Democratic) 44.9%; ▌ Stephen B. Ayres (Prohibition) 5.4%
New York 28	Thomas C. Platt; Redistricted from the 27th district.	Republican	1872	Incumbent re-elected.	▌ ✓ Thomas C. Platt (Republican) 49.6%; ▌ Edward F. Jones (Democratic) 46.9%; ▌ Elbert W. Cook (Prohibition) 3.5%
New York 29	Horace B. Smith; Redistricted from the 28th district.	Republican	1870	Incumbent retired. Democratic gain.	▌ ✓ Charles C. B. Walker (Democratic) 54.6%; ▌ Harlo Hakes (Republican) 45.4%
New York 30	Freeman Clarke; Redistricted from the 29th district.	Republican	1870	Incumbent retired. Republican hold.	▌ ✓ John M. Davy (Republican) 49.2%; ▌ James M. Angle (Democratic) 48.2%; ▌ Alphonso A. Hopkins (Prohibition) 2.6%
New York 31	George Gilbert Hoskins; Redistricted from the 30th district.	Republican	1872	Incumbent re-elected.	▌ ✓ George Gilbert Hoskins (Republican) 54.7%; ▌ John H. Buck (Democratic) 45.4%
New York 32	Lyman K. Bass; Redistricted from the 31st district.	Republican	1872	Incumbent re-elected.	▌ ✓ Lyman K. Bass (Republican) 51.6%; ▌ Asher P. Nichols (Democratic) 48.4%
New York 33	Walter L. Sessions; Redistricted from the 32nd district.	Republican	1870	Incumbent lost re-election. Democratic gain.	▌ ✓ Augustus F. Allen (Democratic) 54.1%; ▌ Walter L. Sessions (Republican) 46.0%

== North Carolina ==
District	Incumbent			This race	
District	Member	Party	First elected	Results	Candidates
North Carolina 1	Clinton L. Cobb	Republican	1868	Incumbent lost re-election. Democratic gain.	▌ ✓ Jesse Johnson Yeates (Democratic) 52.8%; ▌ Clinton L. Cobb (Republican) 47.2%
North Carolina 2	Charles R. Thomas	Republican	1870	Incumbent lost renomination. Republican hold.	▌ ✓ John Adams Hyman (Republican) 62.0%; ▌ George W. Blount (Democratic) 38.0%
North Carolina 3	Alfred Moore Waddell	Democratic	1870	Incumbent re-elected.	▌ ✓ Alfred Moore Waddell (Democratic) 52.5%; ▌ Neil McKay (Republican) 47.8%
North Carolina 4	William Alexander Smith	Republican	1872	Incumbent retired. Democratic gain.	▌ ✓ Joseph J. Davis (Democratic) 52.9%; ▌ James H. Headen (Republican) 47.2%
North Carolina 5	James M. Leach	Democratic	1870	Incumbent retired. Democratic hold.	▌ ✓ Alfred Moore Scales (Democratic) 54.2%; ▌ William F. Henderson (Republican) 45.8%
North Carolina 6	Thomas Samuel Ashe	Democratic	1872	Incumbent re-elected.	▌ ✓ Thomas Samuel Ashe (Democratic) 64.5%; ▌ E. C. Davidson (Independent) 35.5%
North Carolina 7	William M. Robbins	Democratic	1872	Incumbent re-elected.	▌ ✓ William M. Robbins (Democratic) 61.9%; ▌ Columbus L. Cook (Republican) 38.1%
North Carolina 8	Robert B. Vance	Democratic	1872	Incumbent re-elected.	▌ ✓ Robert B. Vance (Democratic) 61.8%; ▌ Plato Durham (Independent) 38.2%

== Ohio ==
District	Incumbent			This race	
District	Member	Party	First elected	Results	Candidates
Ohio 1	Milton Sayler	Democratic	1872	Incumbent re-elected.	▌ ✓ Milton Sayler (Democratic) 61.5%; ▌ John K. Green (Republican) 38.5%
Ohio 2	Henry B. Banning	Liberal Republican	1872	Incumbent re-elected as a Democratic candidate. Democratic gain.	▌ ✓ Henry B. Banning (Democratic) 53.8%; ▌ Job E. Stevenson (Republican) 46.2%
Ohio 3	John Quincy Smith	Republican	1872	Incumbent lost re-election. Democratic gain.	▌ ✓ John S. Savage (Democratic) 52.3%; ▌ John Quincy Smith (Republican) 47.6%
Ohio 4	Lewis B. Gunckel	Republican	1872	Incumbent lost re-election. Democratic gain.	▌ ✓ John A. McMahon (Democratic) 51.5%; ▌ Lewis B. Gunckel (Republican) 47.8%; ▌ Braxton W. Campbell (Prohibition) 0.7%
Ohio 5	Charles N. Lamison	Democratic	1870	Incumbent retired. Democratic hold.	▌ ✓ Americus V. Rice (Democratic) 61.9%; ▌ Reynold K. Lytle (Republican) 38.0%
Ohio 6	Isaac R. Sherwood	Republican	1872	Incumbent retired. Democratic gain.	▌ ✓ Frank H. Hurd (Democratic) 51.9%; ▌ Albert M. Pratt (Republican) 44.6%; ▌ Francis Granger (Prohibition) 3.5%
Ohio 7	Lawrence T. Neal	Democratic	1872	Incumbent re-elected.	▌ ✓ Lawrence T. Neal (Democratic) 55.4%; ▌ Thomas W. Gordon (Republican) 44.5%
Ohio 8	William Lawrence	Republican	1872	Incumbent re-elected.	▌ ✓ William Lawrence (Republican) 48.6%; ▌ Joseph E. Pearson (Democratic) 46.9%; ▌ Joseph A. Sullivan (Prohibition) 4.5%
Ohio 9	James Wallace Robinson	Republican	1872	Incumbent lost re-election. Democratic gain.	▌ ✓ Earley F. Poppleton (Democratic) 48.7%; ▌ James Wallace Robinson (Republican) 46.9%; ▌ [FNU] Harrod (Prohibition) 4.4%
Ohio 10	Charles Foster	Republican	1870	Incumbent re-elected.	▌ ✓ Charles Foster (Republican) 49.8%; ▌ George E. Seney (Democratic) 49.2%; ▌ [FNU] Mead (Prohibition) 1.0%
Ohio 11	Hezekiah S. Bundy	Republican	1872	Incumbent lost re-election. Democratic gain.	▌ ✓ John L. Vance (Democratic) 53.7%; ▌ Hezekiah S. Bundy (Republican) 45.3%; ▌ Daniel W. Locke (Prohibition) 1.0%
Ohio 12	Hugh J. Jewett	Democratic	1872	Incumbent resigned to become President of the Erie Railroad. Democratic hold.	▌ ✓ Ansel T. Walling (Democratic) 57.5%; ▌ David Taylor Jr. (Republican) 40.9%; ▌ Ralph S. Thompson (Prohibition) 1.6%
Ohio 13	Milton I. Southard	Democratic	1872	Incumbent re-elected.	▌ ✓ Milton I. Southard (Democratic) 57.8%; ▌ John H. Barnhill (Republican) 41.0%; ▌ [FNU] Gertner (Prohibition) 1.2%
Ohio 14	John Berry	Democratic	1872	Incumbent retired. Democratic hold.	▌ ✓ Jacob Pitzer Cowan (Democratic) 62.0%; ▌ William W. Armstrong (Republican) 36.1%; ▌ Martin Deal (Prohibition) 1.9%
Ohio 15	William P. Sprague	Republican	1870	Incumbent retired. Republican hold.	▌ ✓ Nelson H. Van Vorhes (Republican) 51.4%; ▌ Wiley H. Oldham (Democratic) 47.0%; ▌ M. Alderman (Prohibition) 1.6%
Ohio 16	Lorenzo Danford	Republican	1872	Incumbent re-elected.	▌ ✓ Lorenzo Danford (Republican) 52.6%; ▌ Henry Boyles (Democratic) 47.2%
Ohio 17	Laurin D. Woodworth	Republican	1872	Incumbent re-elected.	▌ ✓ Laurin D. Woodworth (Republican) 49.6%; ▌ David M. Wilson (Democratic) 48.4%; ▌ [FNU] Paine (Prohibition) 2.0%
Ohio 18	James Monroe	Republican	1870	Incumbent re-elected.	▌ ✓ James Monroe (Republican) 54.5%; ▌ John K. McBride (Democratic) 45.0%; ▌ [FNU] Miller (Prohibition) 0.5%
Ohio 19	James A. Garfield	Republican	1862	Incumbent re-elected.	▌ ✓ James A. Garfield (Republican) 55.6%; ▌ Daniel B. Woods (Democratic) 27.6%; ▌ R. H. Hurlburt (Ind. Republican) 15.1%; ▌ [FNU] Price (Prohibition) 1.7%
Ohio 20	Richard C. Parsons	Republican	1872	Incumbent lost re-election. Democratic gain.	▌ ✓ Henry B. Payne (Democratic) 54.2%; ▌ Richard C. Parsons (Republican) 44.3%; ▌ [FNU] Goodman (Prohibition) 1.5%

== Oregon ==
Oregon Results

District	Incumbent			This race	
District	Member	Party	First elected	Results	Candidates
Oregon at-large	James Nesmith	Democratic	1873	Incumbent retired. New member elected June 1, 1874. Democratic hold.	▌ ✓ George A. La Dow (Democratic) 38.06%; ▌Richard Williams (Republican) 36.87%; ▌Timothy W. Davenport

== Pennsylvania ==
District	Incumbent			This race	
District	Member	Party	First elected	Results	Candidates
Pennsylvania 1	None (new district)			New district. Republican gain.	▌ ✓ Chapman Freeman (Republican) 48.2%; ▌ Thomas B. Florence (Democratic) 39.9%; ▌ David Branson (Independent Republican) 11.9%
Pennsylvania 2	Charles O'Neill	Republican	1872	Incumbent re-elected.	▌ ✓ Charles O'Neill (Republican) 54.8%; ▌ Benjamin Rush (Democratic) 45.2%
Pennsylvania 3	Samuel J. Randall; Redistricted from the 1st district.	Democratic	1862	Incumbent re-elected.	▌ ✓ Samuel J. Randall (Democratic) 57.8%; ▌ David F. Houston (Republican) 42.1%; ▌ B. L. Berry (Independent) 0.1%
Pennsylvania 4	William D. Kelley	Republican	1860	Incumbent re-elected.	▌ ✓ William D. Kelley (Republican) 57.9%; ▌ William V. McGrath (Democratic) 42.1%
Pennsylvania 5	Alfred C. Harmer	Republican	1870	Incumbent lost re-election. Democratic gain.	▌ ✓ John Robbins (Democratic) 38.0%; ▌ Alfred C. Harmer (Republican) 33.8%; ▌ Leonard Myers (Independent Republican) 28.2%
Pennsylvania 5	Leonard Myers; Redistricted from the 3rd district.	Republican	1862	Incumbent lost renomination and lost re-election as an Independent Republican candidate. Republican Loss.	▌ ✓ John Robbins (Democratic) 38.0%; ▌ Alfred C. Harmer (Republican) 33.8%; ▌ Leonard Myers (Independent Republican) 28.2%
Pennsylvania 6	Washington Townsend; Redistricted from the 7th district.	Republican	1868	Incumbent re-elected.	▌ ✓ Washington Townsend (Republican) 57.8%; ▌ J. S. Forwood (Democratic) 42.2%
Pennsylvania 7	None (new district)			New district. Republican gain.	▌ ✓ Alan Wood Jr. (Republican) 52.5%; ▌ Ephraim Acker (Democratic) 47.5%
Pennsylvania 8	Hiester Clymer	Democratic	1872	Incumbent re-elected.	▌ ✓ Hiester Clymer (Democratic) 66.3%; ▌ Charles B. McKnight (Republican) 33.7%
Pennsylvania 9	A. Herr Smith	Republican	1872	Incumbent re-elected.	▌ ✓ A. Herr Smith (Republican) 62.8%; ▌ William Patton (Democratic) 37.2%
Pennsylvania 10	James S. Biery; Redistricted from the 6th district.	Republican	1872	Incumbent retired. Democratic gain.	▌ ✓ William Mutchler (Democratic) 62.7%; ▌ S. V. Kachline (Independent Democratic) 34.2%; ▌ William H. Blumer (Independent Republican) 3.1%
Pennsylvania 11	John B. Storm	Democratic	1870	Incumbent retired. Democratic hold.	▌ ✓ Francis D. Collins (Democratic) 69.0%; ▌ Alexander W. Butler (Republican) 31.0%
Pennsylvania 11	James Dale Strawbridge; Redistricted from the 13th district.	Republican	1872	Incumbent retired. Republican Loss.	▌ ✓ Francis D. Collins (Democratic) 69.0%; ▌ Alexander W. Butler (Republican) 31.0%
Pennsylvania 11	Charles Albright; Redistricted from the at-large district.	Republican	1872	Incumbent retired. Republican Loss.	▌ ✓ Francis D. Collins (Democratic) 69.0%; ▌ Alexander W. Butler (Republican) 31.0%
Pennsylvania 12	Lazarus D. Shoemaker	Republican	1870	Incumbent retired. Republican hold.	▌ ✓ Winthrop Welles Ketcham (Republican) 52.5%; ▌ Hendrick B. Wright (Democratic) 47.5%
Pennsylvania 13	None (new district)			New district. Democratic gain.	▌ ✓ James B. Reilly (Democratic) 51.2%; ▌ Theodore Garrettson (Republican) 48.0%; ▌ William M. Randall (Independent Democratic) 0.8%
Pennsylvania 14	John B. Packer	Republican	1868	Incumbent re-elected.	▌ ✓ John B. Packer (Republican) 56.4%; ▌ William M. Breslin (Democratic) 43.6%
Pennsylvania 14	John W. Killinger; Redistricted from the 10th district.	Republican	1870	Incumbent retired. Republican Loss.	▌ ✓ John B. Packer (Republican) 56.4%; ▌ William M. Breslin (Democratic) 43.6%
Pennsylvania 15	None (new district)			New district. Democratic gain.	▌ ✓ Joseph Powell (Democratic) 50.2%; ▌ Bartholomew Laporte (Republican) 49.8%
Pennsylvania 16	Sobieski Ross; Redistricted from the 18th district.	Republican	1872	Incumbent re-elected.	▌ ✓ Sobieski Ross (Republican) 53.3%; ▌ Henry W. Early (Democratic) 46.7%
Pennsylvania 17	John Cessna; Redistricted from the 16th district.	Republican	1872	Incumbent retired. Democratic gain.	▌ ✓ John Reilly (Democratic) 52.6%; ▌ Samuel Steel Blair (Republican) 47.4%
Pennsylvania 18	John A. Magee; Redistricted from the 15th district.	Democratic	1874	Incumbent lost renomination. Democratic hold.	▌ ✓ William Stenger (Democratic) 52.1%; ▌ Langhorne Wister (Republican) 47.9%
Pennsylvania 18	R. Milton Speer; Redistricted from the 17th district.	Democratic	1870	Incumbent retired. Democratic loss.	▌ ✓ William Stenger (Democratic) 52.1%; ▌ Langhorne Wister (Republican) 47.9%
Pennsylvania 19	Lemuel Todd; Redistricted from the at-large district.	Republican	1872	Incumbent retired. Democratic gain.	▌ ✓ Levi Maish (Democratic) 58.7%; ▌ Hiram G. McNair (Republican) 29.2%; ▌ William McComky (Independent Republican) 12.1%
Pennsylvania 20	None (new district)			New district. Democratic gain.	▌ ✓ Levi A. Mackey (Democratic) 58.1%; ▌ Cyrus T. Alexander (Ind. Democratic/Republican) 41.9%
Pennsylvania 21	None (new district)			New district. Democratic gain.	▌ ✓ Jacob Turney (Democratic) 57.7%; ▌ Andrew Stewart (Republican) 42.3%
Pennsylvania 22	James S. Negley	Republican	1868	Incumbent lost re-election. Democratic gain.	▌ ✓ James Herron Hopkins (Democratic) 55.8%; ▌ James S. Negley (Republican) 43.0%; ▌ Thomas J. Howard (Independent Republican) 1.2%
Pennsylvania 23	None (new district)			New district. Democratic gain.	▌ ✓ Alexander G. Cochran (Democratic) 40.0%; ▌ Thomas M. Bayne (Republican) 38.4%; ▌ S. A. Purviance (Independent Democratic) 21.6%
Pennsylvania 24	William S. Moore	Republican	1872	Incumbent retired. Republican hold.	▌ ✓ John Winfield Wallace (Republican) 52.3%; ▌ George W. Miller (Democratic) 47.7%
Pennsylvania 25	Alexander W. Taylor; Redistricted from the 21st district.	Republican	1872	Incumbent retired. Democratic gain.	▌ ✓ George A. Jenks (Democratic) 51.1%; ▌ Harry White (Republican) 48.9%
Pennsylvania 26	Hiram L. Richmond; Redistricted from the 20th district.	Republican	1872	Incumbent retired. Democratic gain.	▌ ✓ James Sheakley (Democratic) 50.1%; ▌ John G. White (Republican) 49.9%
Pennsylvania 26	Ebenezer McJunkin; Redistricted from the 23rd district.	Republican	1870	Incumbent resigned. Republican loss.	▌ ✓ James Sheakley (Democratic) 50.1%; ▌ John G. White (Republican) 49.9%
Pennsylvania 27	Carlton B. Curtis; Redistricted from the 19th district.	Republican	1872	Incumbent lost re-election. Democratic gain.	▌ ✓ Albert Gallatin Egbert (Democratic) 50.0%; ▌ Carlton B. Curtis (Republican) 50.0%
Pennsylvania 27	Glenni W. Scofield; Redistricted from the at-large district.	Republican	1862	Incumbent retired. Republican loss.	▌ ✓ Albert Gallatin Egbert (Democratic) 50.0%; ▌ Carlton B. Curtis (Republican) 50.0%

== Rhode Island ==
District	Incumbent			This race	
District	Member	Party	First elected	Results	Candidates
Rhode Island 1	Benjamin T. Eames	Republican	1870	Incumbent re-elected.	▌ ✓ Benjamin T. Eames (Republican) 73.3%; ▌ W. B. Beach (Democratic) 26.4%
Rhode Island 2	James M. Pendleton	Republican	1870	Incumbent lost renomination. Republican hold.	▌ ✓ Latimer W. Ballou (Republican) 65.0%; ▌ Samuel Rodman (Democratic) 34.0%

== South Carolina ==
District	Incumbent			This race	
District	Member	Party	First elected	Results	Candidates
South Carolina 1	Joseph Rainey	Republican	1870 (special)	Incumbent re-elected.	▌ ✓ Joseph Rainey (Republican) 51.4%; ▌Samuel Lee (Ind. Republican) 48.6%
South Carolina 2	Alonzo J. Ransier	Republican	1872	Incumbent retired. Independent Republican gain. Election was later successfully challenged, declared vacant, and a special election was then held.	▌ ✓ Edmund W. M. Mackey (Ind. Republican) 54.1%; ▌Charles W. Buttz (Republican) 45.9%
South Carolina 3	Robert B. Elliott	Republican	1870	Incumbent resigned November 1, 1874, to serve as sheriff. Republican hold	▌ ✓ Solomon L. Hoge (Republican) 56.1%; ▌Samuel McGowan (Conservative) 43.9%
South Carolina 4	Alexander S. Wallace	Republican	1868	Incumbent re-elected.	▌ ✓ Alexander S. Wallace (Republican) 53.2%; ▌Joseph B. Kershaw (Conservative) 46.8%
South Carolina 5	Richard H. Cain; Redistricted from the at-large seat	Republican	1872	Incumbent retired. Republican hold.	▌ ✓ Robert Smalls (Republican) 79.4%; ▌J. P. M. Epping (Ind. Republican) 19.9%; Others 0.7%

== Tennessee ==
District	Incumbent			This race	
District	Member	Party	First elected	Results	Candidates
Tennessee 1	Roderick R. Butler	Republican	1867	Incumbent lost re-election. Democratic gain.	▌ ✓ William McFarland (Democratic) 55.54%; ▌Roderick R. Butler (Republican) 44.46%
Tennessee 2	Jacob M. Thornburgh	Republican	1872	Incumbent re-elected.	▌ ✓ Jacob M. Thornburgh (Republican) 51.54%; ▌Alfred Caldwell (Democratic) 48.47%
Tennessee 3	William Crutchfield	Republican	1872	Incumbent retired. Democratic gain.	▌ ✓ George G. Dibrell (Democratic) 65.71%; ▌D. M. Nelson (Republican) 31.60%; ▌William B. Stokes (Independent) 2.70%
Tennessee 4	None (new district)			New district. Democratic gain.	▌ ✓ John W. Head (Democratic) 100% (Note: Died before term began.)
Tennessee 5	John M. Bright; Redistricted from the 4th district.	Democratic	1870	Incumbent re-elected.	▌ ✓ John M. Bright (Democratic) 72.48%; ▌William H. Wisener (Republican) 27.16%; ▌J. D. Putnam (Independent) 0.36%
Tennessee 6	Horace Harrison; Redistricted from the 5th district.	Republican	1872	Incumbent lost re-election. Democratic gain.	▌ ✓ John F. House (Democratic) 62.40%; ▌Horace Harrison (Republican) 37.60%
Tennessee 7	Washington C. Whitthorne; Redistricted from the 7th district.	Democratic	1870	Incumbent re-elected.	▌ ✓ Washington C. Whitthorne (Democratic) 78.13%; ▌Theodore H. Gibbs (Republican) 14.32%; ▌G. W. Blackburn (Independent Republican) 7.55%
Tennessee 8	John D. C. Atkins; Redistricted from the 7th district.	Democratic	1872	Incumbent re-elected.	▌ ✓ John D. C. Atkins (Democratic) 66.36%; ▌T. C. Muse (Republican) 33.64%
Tennessee 9	David A. Nunn; Redistricted from the 8th district.	Republican	1872	Incumbent lost re-election. Democratic gain.	▌ ✓ William P. Caldwell (Democratic) 72.05%; ▌David A. Nunn (Republican) 27.95%
Tennessee 10	Barbour Lewis; Redistricted from the 9th district.	Republican	1872	Incumbent lost re-election. Democratic gain.	▌ ✓ H. Casey Young (Democratic) 60.38%; ▌Barbour Lewis (Republican) 39.62%

== Texas ==
District	Incumbent			This race	
District	Member	Party	First elected	Results	Candidates
Texas 1	William S. Herndon	Democratic	1871	Incumbent lost renomination. Democratic hold.	▌ ✓ John H. Reagan (Democratic) 75.6%; ▌ William Chambers (Republican) 24.2%
Texas 2	William P. McLean	Democratic	1872	Incumbent retired. Democratic hold.	▌ ✓ David B. Culberson (Democratic) 99.6%
Texas 3	New district			New seat. Democratic gain.	▌ ✓ James W. Throckmorton (Democratic) 93.0%; ▌ J. M. Valentine (Independent) 5.5%; ▌ F. W. Sumner (Republican) 1.5%
Texas 4	Roger Q. Mills; Redistricted from the at-large seat	Democratic	1872	Incumbent re-elected.	▌ ✓ Roger Q. Mills (Democratic) 72.2%; ▌ Pleasant M. Yell (Republican) 27.8%
Texas 5	John Hancock; Redistricted from the 4th district	Democratic	1871	Incumbent re-elected.	▌ ✓ John Hancock (Democratic) 97.3%
Texas 5	D. C. Giddings; Redistricted from the 3rd district	Democratic	1871	Incumbent retired. Democratic loss.	▌ ✓ John Hancock (Democratic) 97.3%
Texas 5	Asa H. Willie; Redistricted from the at-large seat	Democratic	1872	Incumbent retired. Democratic loss.	▌ ✓ John Hancock (Democratic) 97.3%
Texas 6	New district			New seat. Democratic gain.	▌ ✓ Gustav Schleicher (Democratic) 69.3%; ▌ Jeremiah Galvan (Republican) 30.5%

== Utah Territory ==
See Non-voting delegates, below.

== Vermont ==
District	Incumbent			This race	
District	Member	Party	First elected	Results	Candidates
Vermont 1	Charles W. Willard	Republican	1868	Incumbent lost re-election. Republican hold.	▌ ✓ Charles H. Joyce (Republican) 69.4%; ▌Homer W. Heaton (Democratic) 18.7%; ▌Charles W. Willard (Republican) 11.8%
Vermont 2	Luke P. Poland	Republican	1866	Incumbent lost re-election. Independent Republican gain.	First ballot: ▌Dudley C. Denison (Ind. Republican) 44.7%; ▌Luke P. Poland (Republican) 36.6%; ▌Charles Davenport (Democratic) 12.5%; ▌John B. Mead (Ind. Republican) 4.2%; Second ballot: ▌ ✓ Dudley C. Denison (Ind. Republican) 58.7%; ▌Luke P. Poland (Republican) 29.9%; ▌Alexander McLane (Democratic) 11.3%
Vermont 3	George Hendee	Republican	1872	Incumbent re-elected.	▌ ✓ George Hendee (Republican) 71.3%; ▌John Edwards (Democratic) 28.7%

== Virginia ==
District	Incumbent			This race	
District	Member	Party	First elected	Results	Candidates
Virginia 1	James Beverley Sener	Republican	1872	Incumbent lost re-election. Democratic gain.	▌ ✓ Beverly B. Douglas (Democratic) 50.7%; ▌James Beverley Sener (Republican) 49.3%
Virginia 2	James H. Platt Jr.	Republican	1869	Incumbent lost re-election. Democratic gain.	▌ ✓ John Goode (Democratic) 49.4%; ▌James H. Platt Jr. (Republican) 48.9%; ▌Robert Norton (Republican) 1.6%
Virginia 3	J. Ambler Smith	Republican	1869	Incumbent lost renomination. Democratic gain.	▌ ✓ Gilbert C. Walker (Democratic) 55.3%; ▌Rush Bargess (Republican) 44.5%; ▌R. A. Paul (Unknown) 0.2%
Virginia 4	William H. H. Stowell	Republican	1870	Incumbent re-elected.	▌ ✓ William H. H. Stowell (Republican) 63.9%; ▌William Hodges Mann (Democratic) 35.9%; ▌C. H. Porter (Independent) 0.2%
Virginia 5	Christopher Thomas	Republican	1872 (contest)	Incumbent lost re-election. Democratic gain.	▌ ✓ George Cabell (Democratic) 57.1%; ▌Christopher Thomas (Republican) 42.9%
Virginia 6	Thomas Whitehead	Democratic	1872	Incumbent retired. Democratic hold.	▌ ✓ J. Randolph Tucker (Democratic) 65.2%; ▌J. Foote Johnson (Republican) 34.8%
Virginia 7	John T. Harris	Democratic	1870	Incumbent re-elected.	▌ ✓ John T. Harris (Democratic) 73.6%; ▌John F. Lewis (Republican) 25.5%; ▌John F. Early (Unknown) 0.5%; ▌Charles T. O'Ferrall (Independent) 0.4%
Virginia 8	Eppa Hunton	Democratic	1872	Incumbent re-elected.	▌ ✓ Eppa Hunton (Democratic) 51.4%; ▌James Barbour (Republican) 48.6%
Virginia 9	Rees Bowen	Democratic	1872	Incumbent retired. Democratic hold.	▌ ✓ William Terry (Democratic) 48.4%; ▌Fayette McMullen (Independent) 40.6%; ▌George W. Henderlite (Republican) 10.9%

== Washington Territory ==
See Non-voting delegates, below.

== West Virginia ==
District	Incumbent			This race	
District	Member	Party	First elected	Results	Candidates
West Virginia 1	John J. Davis	Independent; Democratic	1870	Incumbent retired. Democratic gain.	▌ ✓ Benjamin Wilson (Democratic) 50.33%; ▌Nathan Goff Jr. (Republican) 49.67%
West Virginia 2	John Hagans	Republican	1872	Incumbent lost re-election as an Independent. Democratic gain.	▌ ✓ Charles J. Faulkner (Democratic) 57.51%; ▌Alexander Boteler (Republican) 40.32%; ▌John Hagans (Independent) 2.17%
West Virginia 3	Frank Hereford	Democratic	1870	Incumbent re-elected.	▌ ✓ Frank Hereford (Democratic) 63.59%; ▌John Witcher (Republican) 36.41%

== Wisconsin ==
District	Incumbent			This race	
District	Member	Party	First elected	Results	Candidates
Wisconsin 1	Charles G. Williams	Republican	1872	Incumbent re-elected.	▌ ✓ Charles G. Williams (Republican) 56.9%; ▌Nicholas D. Fratt (Democratic) 43.1%
Wisconsin 2	Gerry Whiting Hazelton	Republican	1870	Incumbent retired. Republican hold.	▌ ✓ Lucien B. Caswell (Republican) 50.5%; ▌Amasa G. Cook (Democratic) 49.5%
Wisconsin 3	J. Allen Barber	Republican	1870	Incumbent retired. Republican hold.	▌ ✓ Henry S. Magoon (Republican) 52.7%; ▌Charles F. Thompson (Democratic) 47.3%
Wisconsin 4	Alexander Mitchell	Democratic	1870	Incumbent retired. Democratic hold.	▌ ✓ William Pitt Lynde (Democratic) 55.8%; ▌Harrison Ludington (Republican) 44.2%
Wisconsin 5	Charles A. Eldredge	Democratic	1862	Incumbent lost renomination. Democratic hold.	▌ ✓ Samuel D. Burchard (Democratic) 61.5%; ▌Hiram Barber (Republican) 38.5%
Wisconsin 6	Philetus Sawyer	Republican	1864	Incumbent retired. Republican hold.	▌ ✓ Alanson M. Kimball (Republican) 50.2%; ▌Gabriel Bouck (Democratic) 49.8%
Wisconsin 7	Jeremiah M. Rusk	Republican	1870	Incumbent re-elected.	▌ ✓ Jeremiah M. Rusk (Republican) 57.4%; ▌David C. Fulton (Democratic) 42.6%
Wisconsin 8	Alexander S. McDill	Republican	1872	Incumbent lost re-election. Democratic gain.	▌ ✓ George W. Cate (Democratic) 50.0%; ▌Alexander S. McDill (Republican) 50.0%

== Wyoming Territory ==
See Non-voting delegates, below.

== Non-voting delegates ==
District	Incumbent			This race	
District	Delegate	Party	First elected	Results	Candidates
Arizona Territory at-large
Dakota Territory at-large	Moses K. Armstrong	Democratic	1870	Incumbent lost re-election. Republican gain.	▌ ✓ Jefferson P. Kidder (Republican) 67.74%; ▌Moses K. Armstrong (Democratic) 32.26%
Colorado Territory at-large	Jerome B. Chaffee	Republican	1870	Incumbent retired. Democratic gain.	▌ ✓ Thomas M. Patterson (Democratic) 56.3%; ▌Henry P. H. Bromwell (Republican) 44.7%
Idaho Territory at-large	John Hailey	Democratic	1872	Incumbent retired. Independent gain. Result successfully contested. Democratic hold.	▌ ✓ Stephen S. Fenn (Democratic) 51.02%; ▌Thomas W. Bennett (Independent) 48.98%
Montana Territory at-large	Martin Maginnis	Democratic	1872	Incumbent re-elected.	▌ ✓ Martin Maginnis (Democratic) 55.57%; ▌Cornelius Hedges (Republican) 44.43%
New Mexico Territory at-large
Utah Territory at-large
Washington Territory at-large
Wyoming Territory at-large	William R. Steele	Democratic	1872	Incumbent re-elected.	▌ ✓ William R. Steele (Democratic) 56.53%; ▌Joseph M. Carey (Republican) 43.47%

== See also ==
- 1874 United States elections
  - 1874–75 United States Senate elections
- 43rd United States Congress
- 44th United States Congress

== Bibliography ==
- Dubin, Michael J. (March 1, 1998). United States Congressional Elections, 1788-1997: The Official Results of the Elections of the 1st Through 105th Congresses. McFarland and Company. ISBN 978-0786402830.
- Martis, Kenneth C. (January 1, 1989). The Historical Atlas of Political Parties in the United States Congress, 1789-1989. Macmillan Publishing Company. ISBN 978-0029201701.
- Moore, John L., ed. (1994). Congressional Quarterly's Guide to U.S. Elections (Third ed.). Congressional Quarterly Inc. ISBN 978-0871879967.
- "Party Divisions of the House of Representatives* 1789–Present". Office of the Historian, House of United States House of Representatives.
