= 1872 United States House of Representatives elections in South Carolina =

The 1872 United States House of Representatives elections in South Carolina were held on November 5, 1872, to select five Representatives for two-year terms from the state of South Carolina. The three incumbents who ran were re-elected and the two open seats were retained by the Republicans. The composition of the state delegation thus remained solely Republican.

== 1st congressional district ==
Incumbent Republican Congressman Joseph Rainey of the 1st congressional district, in office since 1870, was unopposed in his bid for re-election.

=== General election results ===
South Carolina's 1st congressional district election results, 1872
Party	Candidate	Votes	%	±%
Republican	Joseph Rainey (incumbent)	19,765	100.0	+36.5
No party	Write-Ins	3	0.0	0.0
Majority		19,762	100.0	+73.0
Turnout		19,768		
Republican hold				

== 2nd congressional district ==
Incumbent Republican Congressman Robert C. De Large of the 2nd congressional district, in office since 1871, declined to run for re-election. Alonzo J. Ransier was nominated by the Republicans and defeated Independent Republican challenger William Gurney in the general election.

=== General election results ===
South Carolina's 2nd congressional district election results, 1872
Party	Candidate	Votes	%	±%
Republican	Alonzo J. Ransier	20,061	75.4	−20.9
Independent Republican	William Gurney	6,549	24.6	+24.6
No party	Write-Ins	11	0.0	−1.1
Majority		13,512	50.8	−47.9
Turnout		26,621		
Republican hold				

== 3rd congressional district ==
Incumbent Republican Congressman Robert B. Elliott of the 3rd congressional district, in office since 1871, defeated two Democratic candidates in the general election.

=== General election results ===
South Carolina's 3rd congressional district election results, 1872
Party	Candidate	Votes	%	±%
Republican	Robert B. Elliott (incumbent)	20,564	92.5	+33.0
Democratic	W.H. McCaw	1,094	4.9	+4.9
Democratic	Samuel McGowan	411	1.9	+1.9
No party	Write-Ins	166	0.7	+0.7
Majority		18,893	87.6	+68.6
Turnout		22,235		
Republican hold				

== 4th congressional district ==
Incumbent Republican Congressman Alexander S. Wallace of the 4th congressional district, in office since 1870, defeated Democratic challenger Benjamin Franklin Perry.

=== General election results ===
South Carolina's 4th congressional district election results, 1872
Party	Candidate	Votes	%	±%
Republican	Alexander S. Wallace (incumbent)	14,590	53.1	−2.2
Democratic	Benjamin Franklin Perry	12,879	46.9	+2.5
No party	Write-Ins	3	0.0	−0.3
Majority		1,711	6.2	−4.7
Turnout		27,472		
Republican hold				

== At-large district ==
The state unsuccessfully applied to have a fifth member seated in 1871 in the House of Representatives. Following apportionment from the 1870 census, the state was granted an extra seat and an At-large election was used to decide the fifth member. Republican Richard H. Cain defeated Independent Republican L.E. Johnson in the election and became the only member from South Carolina to be elected from an At-large district.

=== General election results ===
South Carolina's at-large congressional district election results, 1872
Party	Candidate	Votes	%	±%
Republican	Richard H. Cain	71,321	72.0	−28.0
Independent Republican	Lewis E. Johnson	26,394	26.6	+26.6
No party	Write-Ins	1,404	1.4	+1.4
Majority		44,927	45.4	+45.4
Turnout		99,119		
Republican gain				

== See also ==
- United States House of Representatives elections, 1872
- South Carolina gubernatorial election, 1872
- South Carolina's congressional districts
