= Brookfield Cemetery =

Historic cemetery in Massachusetts, United States

- U.S. National Register of Historic Places
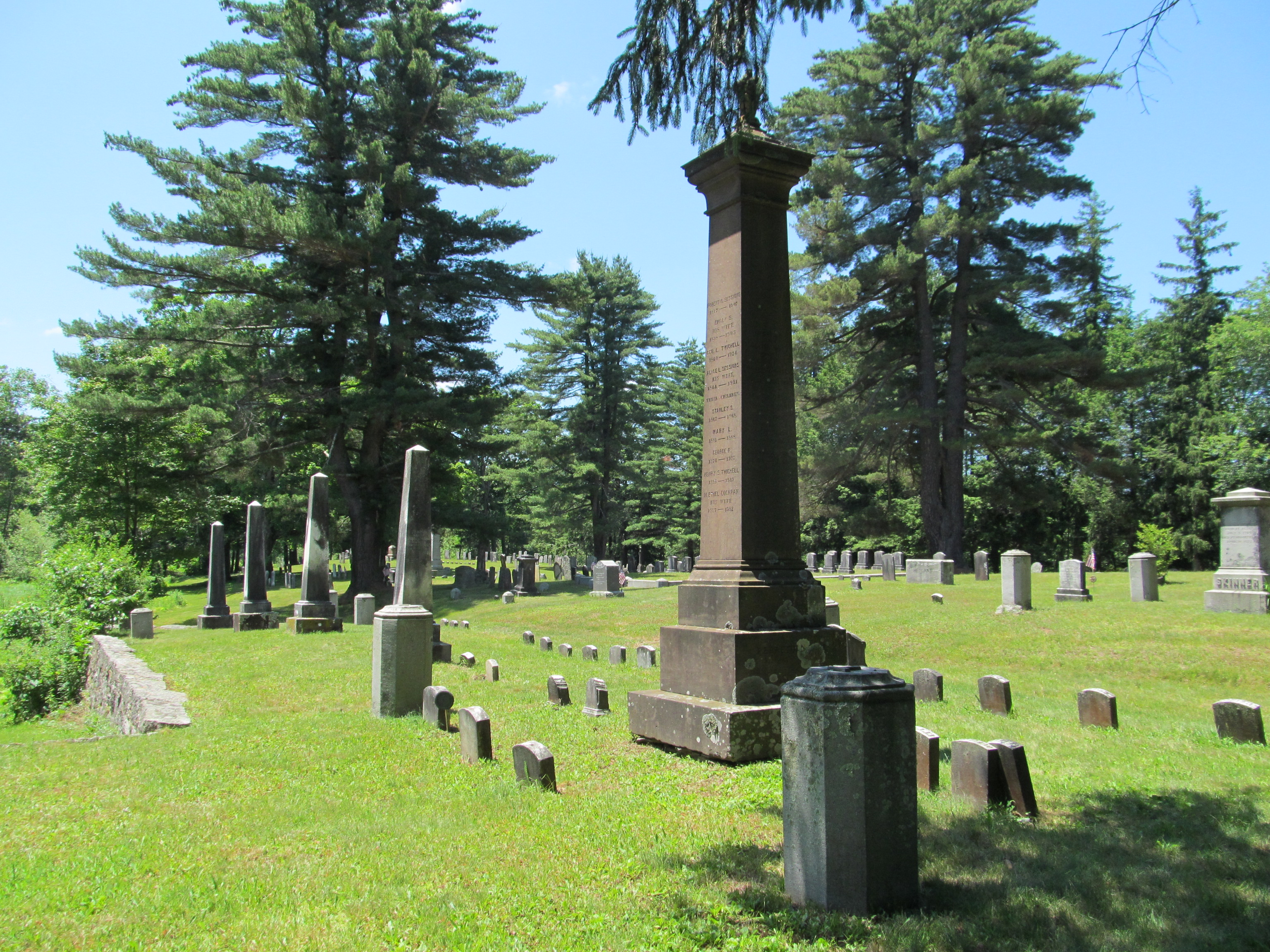
- Brookfield Cemetery

- Location within Massachusetts Location within the United States
- Location: Brookfield, Massachusetts
- Coordinates: 42°13′2″N 72°6′49″W
- Area: 43 acres (17 ha)
- Built: 1714
- NRHP reference No.: 03000384
- Added to NRHP: May 9, 2003

Brookfield Cemetery is an historic cemetery on Main Street (Massachusetts Route 9) on the west side of Brookfield, Massachusetts. Established in 1714, it is the town's only cemetery. It consequently holds the burials of many of Brookfield's founders and leading citizens, from the 18th century to the present, including those of neighboring towns that were once a part of Brookfield. The 43-acre (17 ha) cemetery has about 10,000 marked graves. It was listed on the National Register of Historic Places in 2003.

The cemetery was developed in three distinct phases. Brookfield once encompassed most of what is now the towns of Warren, West Brookfield, and East Brookfield, with the West Brookfield area being the earliest area of settlement in the 1670s. First known as Quaboag Plantation, it was abandoned after a 1675 attack by Native Americans in King Philip's War, and resettlement only began early in the 18th century. Burial practices before 1714 are poorly documented. In that year local church members set aside the first plot of land for burials; this was confirmed by town officials after Brookfield was incorporated in 1720. The cemetery was at first owned as part of church lands, but 5 acres (2.0 ha) (the westernmost portion of the modern cemetery) were deeded to the town of Brookfield in 1760, probably as part of the division of the town into three parishes (which later became Brookfield, East Brookfield, and West Brookfield).

During the 19th century the town undertook a number of improvements to the cemetery. A stone wall was built around it in the 1850s, and a receiving tomb was added in 1861. The large granite entrance gate was built in 1873, the gift of local residents William Banister and Otis Hayden Banister, and its Civil War memorial was dedicated in 1890. These were added in the central section of the cemetery, which was laid out in the Victorian rural cemetery style that was then fashionable.

The easternmost part of the cemetery was developed beginning about 1920, and has been expanded several times, most recently in 1996. Its layout reflects the aesthetics of the 20th Century Modern Cemetery movement.

== Notable interments ==
Brookfield Cemetery has the burials of many notable figures:

- Dwight Foster, U. S. Senator and U.S. Representative
- Albert R. Howe- Union Army officer and politician who served as a single term as U.S. Representative for Mississippi.

== See also ==
- National Register of Historic Places listings in Worcester County, Massachusetts
