= Joseph L. Morphis =

American politician

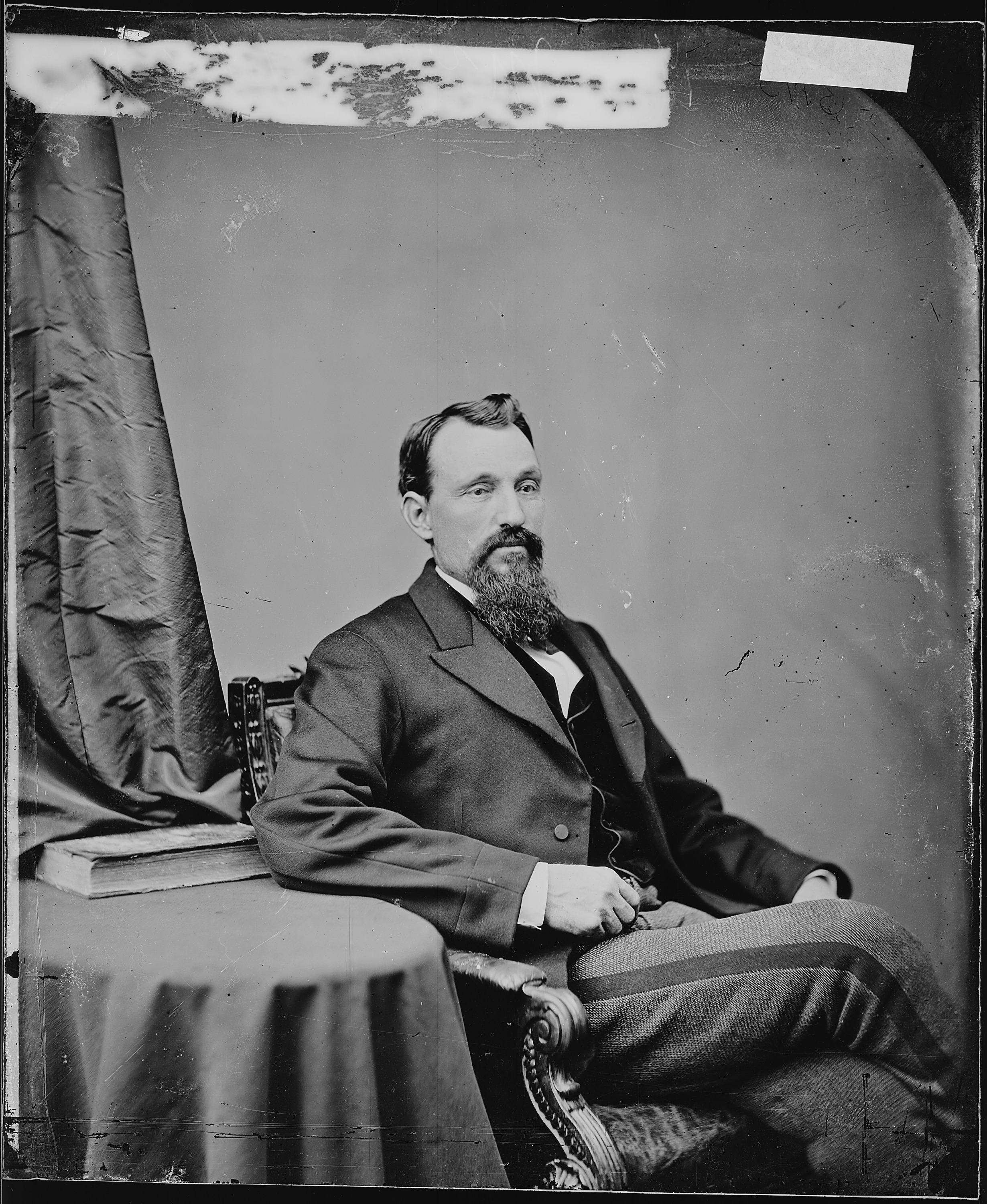
Brady-Handy (Levin C. Handy and Mathew Brady) photo from the National Archives and Records Administration

Joseph Lewis Morphis (April 17, 1831 – July 29, 1913) was a U.S. representative from Mississippi.

Born near Pocahontas, McNairy County, Tennessee, Morphis pursued elementary studies.

He engaged in planting. He served as a member of the Mississippi House of Representatives in 1859. He entered the Confederate States Army as captain in August 1861 and served until the close of the Civil War. He moved with his family to Pontotoc, Mississippi, in 1863.

He served as a member of the State constitutional convention in 1865. He served as a member of the State house of representatives from 1866 to 1868. Upon Mississippi's readmission to the Union, Morhpis was elected in Mississippi's 2nd congressional district as a Republican to the Forty-first and Forty-second Congresses and served from February 23, 1870, to March 3, 1873. He was an unsuccessful candidate for renomination in 1872. He was appointed by President Rutherford Hayes as United States Marshal of the Northern District of Mississippi, serving from 1877 to 1885. Licensed as an Indian trader on the Osage Reservation in 1890 and engaged in that occupation until 1901. He lived in retirement until his death in Cleveland, Oklahoma, July 29, 1913. He was interred in Woodland Cemetery.

U.S. House of Representatives
Preceded by Reuben Davis	Member of the U.S. House of Representatives from Mississippi's 2nd congressional district 1870–1873	Succeeded by Albert R. Howe
