= William Hartzell =

American politician (1837–1903)

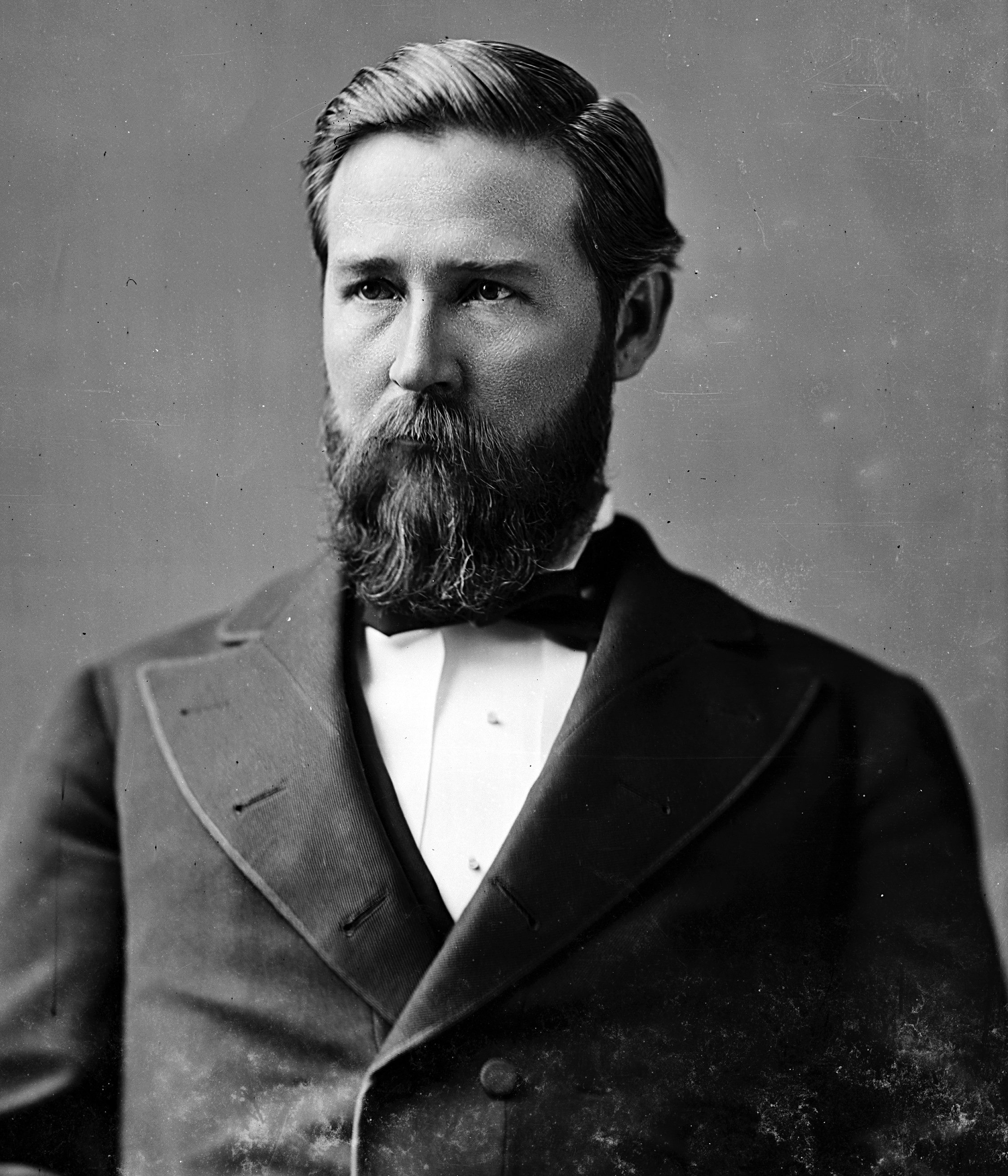

Member of the U.S. House of Representatives from Illinois's 18th district
- In office March 4, 1875 – March 3, 1879
- Preceded by: Isaac Clements
- Succeeded by: John R. Thomas

Personal details
- Born: February 20, 1837 Canton, Ohio, U.S.
- Died: August 14, 1903 (aged 66) Chester, Illinois, U.S.
- Party: Democratic

William Hartzell (February 20, 1837 – August 14, 1903) was a U.S. representative from Illinois.

Hartzell was born in Canton, Ohio. He moved with his parents to Danville, Illinois, in 1840. In 1844 the Hartzells moved to Mexico, where William Hartzell remained until 1853. In 1853 Hartzell returned to the United States and moved to Randolph County, Illinois. He then went to study law at McKendree College. Hartzell graduated from McKendree in 1859. He settled in Chester, Illinois. He was admitted to the bar in 1864 and commenced practice in Chester, Illinois.

Hartzell was elected as a Democrat to the Forty-fourth and Forty-fifth Congresses (March 4, 1875 – March 4, 1879). He was not a candidate for renomination in 1878. He resumed the practice of law in Chester. He served as judge of the third judicial circuit of Illinois 1897–1903. He died in Chester, Illinois, August 14, 1903. He was interred in Evergreen Cemetery.

U.S. House of Representatives
Preceded by Isaac Clements	Member of the U.S. House of Representatives from Illinois's 18th congressional district 1875-1879	Succeeded by John R. Thomas
