= Albert R. Howe =

American politician

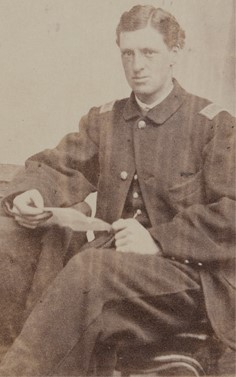

Member of the U.S. House of Representatives from Mississippi's 2nd district
- In office March 4, 1873 – March 3, 1875
- Preceded by: Joseph L. Morphis
- Succeeded by: Guilford Wiley Wells

Member of the Mississippi House of Representatives
- In office 1870–1872

Personal details
- Born: Albert Richards Howe; January 1, 1840 Brookfield, Massachusetts, US
- Died: June 1, 1884 (aged 44) Chicago, Illinois, US
- Resting place: Brookfield Cemetery; Brookfield, Massachusetts, US
- Party: Republican
- Parent(s): Francis Howe; Maria A. Richards Howe
- Occupation: Businessman; Politician

Military service
- Branch/service: Union Army
- Years of service: 1861-1865
- Rank: Major
- Battles/wars: American Civil War

Albert Richards Howe (January 1, 1840 – June 1, 1884) was an American businessman, Civil War veteran and politician. He represented Mississippi in the U.S. House of Representatives and served in the Mississippi House of Representatives for one term from 1873 to 1875.

== Early life ==
Howe was born in Brookfield, Massachusetts, the son of Francis Howe and Maria A. (Richards) Howe. He pursued classical studies.

== Civil War ==
In 1861, he enlisted as a private in the Union Army and served in the Forty-seventh Regiment of the Massachusetts Volunteer Infantry. During the Civil War, he served in Virginia under General Ulysses S. Grant until Robert E. Lee's surrender at Appomattox, Virginia. After Lee's surrender, Howe served under General Godfrey Weitzel in Texas until his discharge on November 30, 1865. By the time of his discharge, he had been promoted to major.

After his military service, he moved to Como, Mississippi and became involved in cotton planting.

== Political career ==
He became involved in politics and was a member of the Mississippi Constitutional Convention in 1868. He also served as a delegate to the Republican National Convention in 1868. In 1869 he was appointed treasurer of Panola County, Mississippi.

=== State legislature ===
From 1870 to 1872 he was a member of the Mississippi House of Representatives.

=== Congress ===
Howe was elected as a Republican candidate to the Forty-third Congress, serving from March 4, 1873, to March 3, 1875. In Congress, he served on the Committee on Claims. He was an unsuccessful candidate for reelection in 1874 to the Forty-fourth Congress.

== Later career and death ==
After leaving Congress, he moved to Chicago, Illinois and worked in the brokerage business. He died in Chicago on June 1, 1884, and is interred in Brookfield Cemetery in Brookfield, Massachusetts.

== Family life ==
Howe's father, Francis Howe, was a member of the Massachusetts House of Representatives and the Massachusetts Senate.

U.S. House of Representatives
Preceded by Joseph L. Morphis	Member of the U.S. House of Representatives from Mississippi's 2nd congressional district 1873-1875	Succeeded by Guilford Wiley Wells
