= Guilford Wiley Wells =

American politician

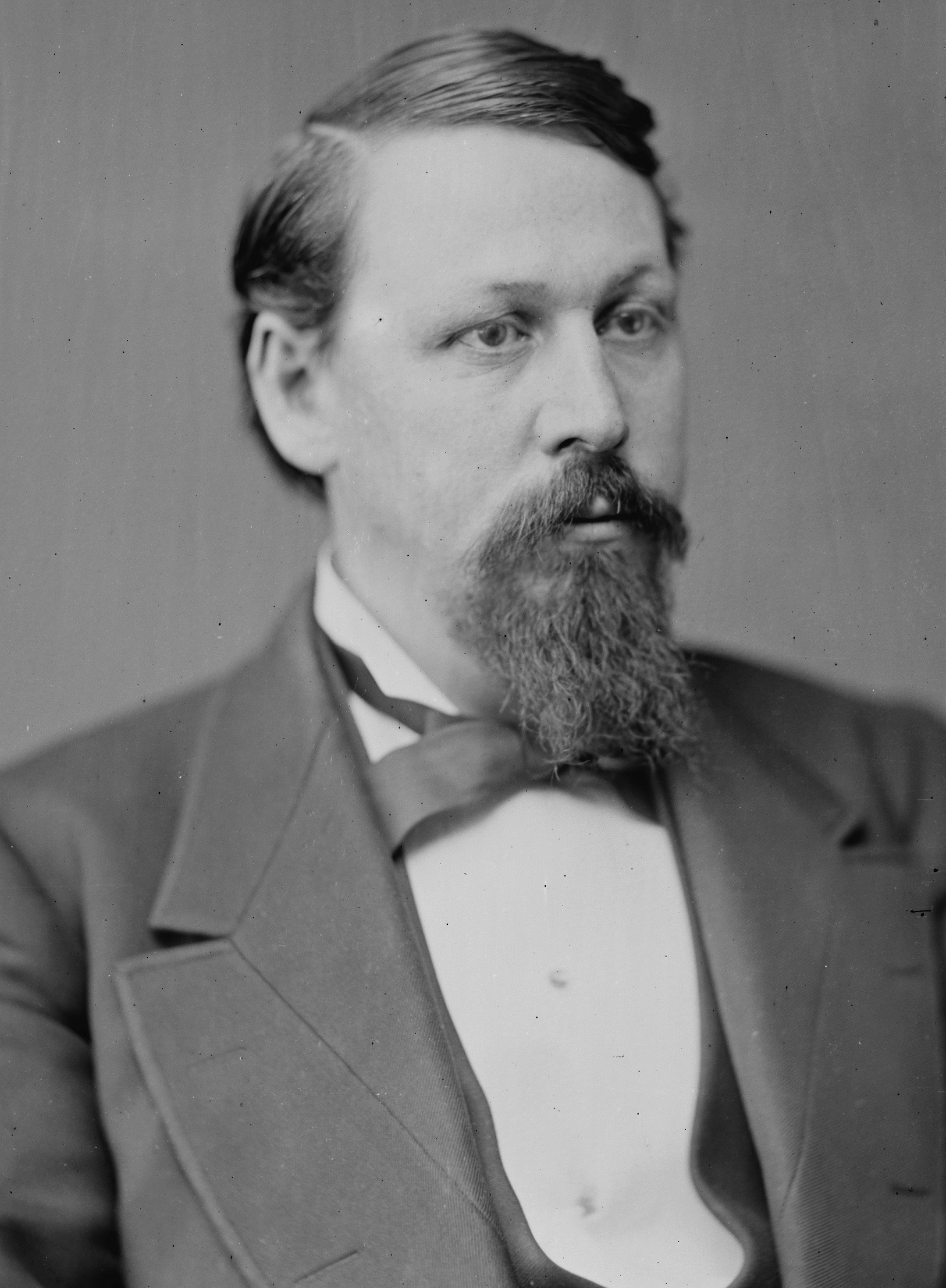

Member of the U.S. House of Representatives from Mississippi's 2nd district
- In office March 4, 1875 – March 3, 1877
- Preceded by: Albert R. Howe
- Succeeded by: Van. H. Manning

Personal details
- Born: February 14, 1840 Conesus Center, New York
- Died: 21 March 1909 (aged 69) Santa Monica, California
- Resting place: Evergreen Cemetery, Los Angeles
- Party: Independent Republican
- Profession: Lawyer

Guilford Wiley Wells (February 14, 1840 – March 21, 1909) was a Reconstruction-era U.S. Representative from Mississippi.

Born in Conesus Center, New York, Wells attended the Genesee Wesleyan Seminary and College in Lima.

He enlisted in the Union Army as a private in the Twenty-seventh New York Infantry May 21, 1861. He was promoted to second lieutenant in the One Hundred and Thirtieth New York Infantry in 1862 and subsequently to first lieutenant and captain in the Nineteenth New York Cavalry. He was mustered out on February 10, 1865, as a lieutenant colonel.

Wiles graduated from the law department of Columbian College (later George Washington University), in Washington, D.C., in 1867. He was admitted to the bar in 1867 and commenced practice in Holly Springs, Mississippi. He served as United States Attorney for the Northern District of Mississippi between 1870 and 1875.

Wells was elected as an Independent Republican to the Forty-fourth Congress (March 4, 1875 – March 3, 1877). He declined to be a candidate for renomination in 1876.

He served as United States Consul General in Shanghai, China, from June 23, 1877, to May 26, 1879.

He settled in Los Angeles, California, in 1879 and resumed the practice of law. He died in Santa Monica, California, March 21, 1909. He was interred in Evergreen Cemetery, Los Angeles, California.

U.S. House of Representatives
Preceded by Albert R. Howe	Member of the U.S. House of Representatives from Mississippi's 2nd congressional district 1875-1877	Succeeded by Van H. Manning
