= Isaac Clements =

American politician (1837–1909)

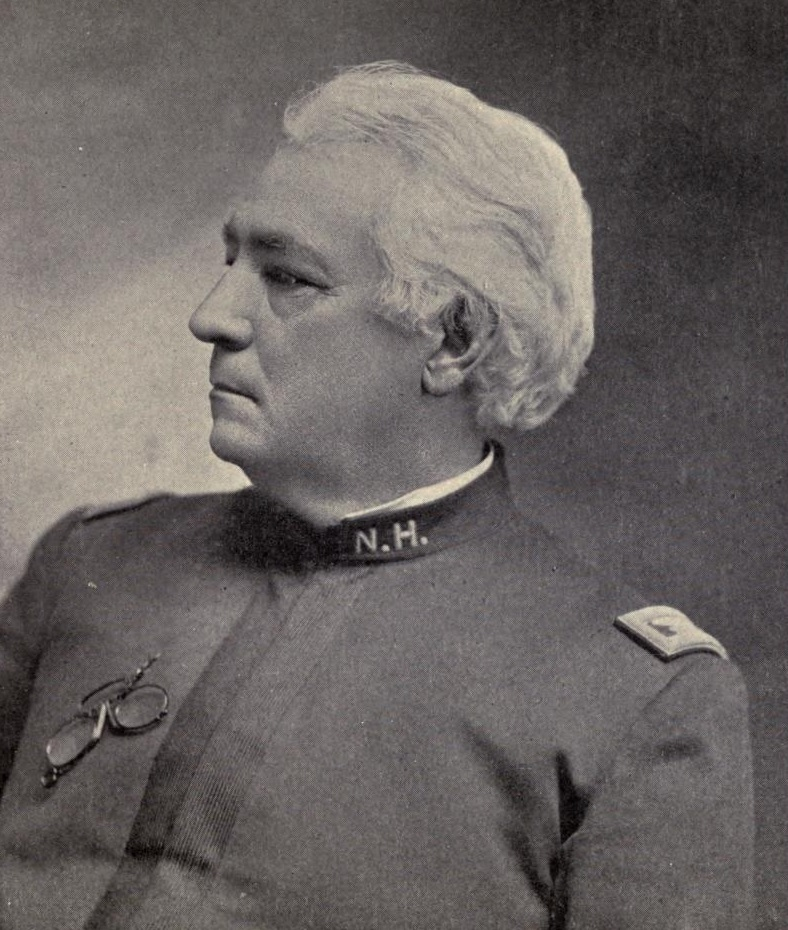
- From 1900's History of Illinois Republicanism. The "NH" insignia stands for "National Home" and was taken during Clements' governorship of the National Home for Disabled Veteran Soldiers.

Member of the U.S. House of Representatives from Illinois's 18th district
- In office March 4, 1873 – March 3, 1875
- Preceded by: District created
- Succeeded by: William Hartzell

Personal details
- Born: March 31, 1837 Franklin County, Indiana, U.S.
- Died: May 31, 1909 (aged 72) Danville, Illinois, U.S.
- Party: Republican
- Spouse: Josie Nutt (m. 1864)

Isaac Clements (March 31, 1837 – May 31, 1909) was a U.S. representative from Illinois.

== Biography ==
Born near Brookville, Indiana, Clements attended the common schools. He was graduated from the Indiana Asbury College (now De Pauw University), Greencastle, Indiana, in 1859. He studied law in Greencastle. He moved to Illinois and taught school. He entered the Union Army in July 1861 and served as second lieutenant of Company G, 9th Illinois Infantry Regiment. He remained in the service for over three years. He was twice promoted. He was appointed register in bankruptcy in June 1867.

He married Josie Nutt, the daughter of Indiana University president Cyrus Nutt, in November 1864.

Clements was elected as a Republican to the Forty-third Congress (March 4, 1873 – March 3, 1875). He was an unsuccessful candidate for reelection in 1874 to the Forty-fourth Congress. He was appointed a United States penitentiary commissioner in 1877. He was a United States pension agent in Chicago, Illinois, from March 18, 1890, until November 4, 1893.

He moved to Normal, Illinois, in 1899, to serve as superintendent of the Soldiers' Orphans' Home. He subsequently received an appointment as governor of the National Home for Disabled Veteran Soldiers in Danville, Illinois. He died there on May 31, 1909, and was interred in the Home's cemetery. On September 22, 1922, his remains were moved to Spring Hill Cemetery in Danville.

U.S. House of Representatives
Preceded by District created	Member of the U.S. House of Representatives from Illinois's 18th congressional district 1873–1875	Succeeded by William Hartzell
