= South Carolina's at-large congressional seat =

South Carolina's at-large congressional district
- Obsolete district
- Created: 1870
- Eliminated: 1875
- Years active: 1873–1875

South Carolina was readmitted to Congress in 1868, after passage of the 14th Amendment. That amendment ended the three-fifths rule effectively raising the population of states that once had slavery. As a result, South Carolina and other slave states tried to seat extra members of Congress. South Carolina choose two additional congress members during an at-large election in 1870. In one of those, Johann Peter Martin Epping defeated Lucius W. Wimbush by 61 votes: 71,803-71,742. But the House refused to seat him and the other at-large winner. "A number of southern states upon readmission claimed that since their slaves were emancipated, they were entitled to larger delegations in the House. Epping's election falls in this category. The claims were rejected by the House."

In 1873, South Carolina's apportionment in the United States House of Representatives was officially increased from 4 to 5 members. From 1873 to 1875, therefore, the state elected its fifth member at-large statewide. In 1875, the state redistricted its seats and the at-large seat was eliminated.

The at-large representative was Republican Richard H. Cain.

== List of member representing the district ==
Member (Residence)	Party	Years	Cong ress	Electoral history
District established March 4, 1873
Richard H. Cain (Columbia)	Republican	March 4, 1873 – March 3, 1875	43rd	Elected in 1872. Retired.
District dissolved March 3, 1875
