= Richard H. Cain =

American politician (1825–1887)

The Reverend Richard Harvey Cain
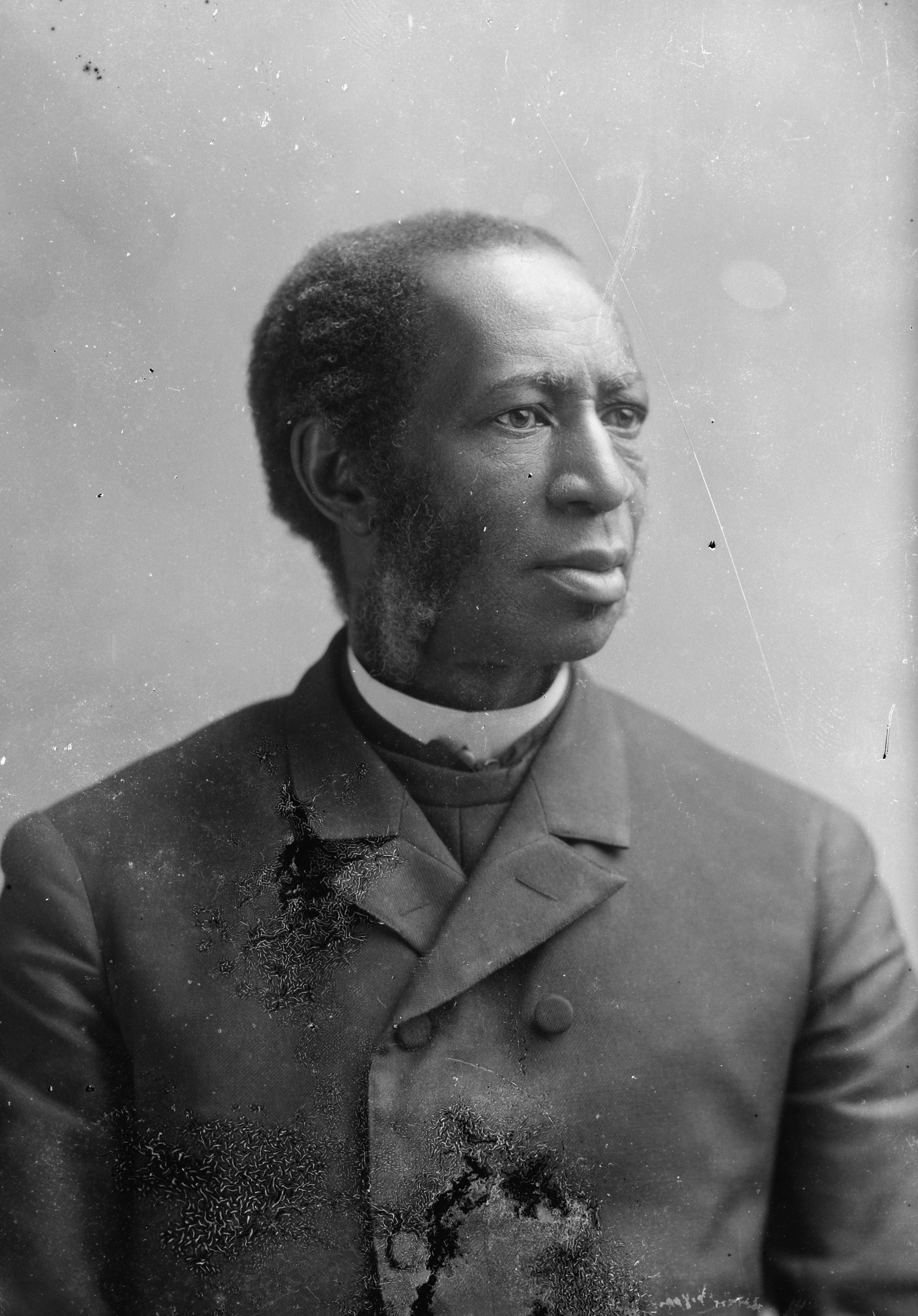
- Portrait by C. M. Bell c. 1873–1879

Member of the U.S. House of Representatives from South Carolina
- In office March 4, 1877 – March 3, 1879
- Preceded by: Charles W. Buttz
- Succeeded by: Michael P. O'Connor
- Constituency: 2nd district
- In office March 4, 1873 – March 3, 1875
- Preceded by: District created
- Succeeded by: District eliminated
- Constituency: at-large seat

Member of the South Carolina Senate from Charleston County
- In office November 24, 1868 – March 1, 1870

Personal details
- Born: April 12, 1825 Greenbrier County, Virginia (now West Virginia), U.S.
- Died: January 18, 1887 (aged 61) Washington, D.C., U.S.
- Party: Republican
- Spouse: Laura
- Profession: Minister
- Nickname: "Daddy Cain"

Richard Harvey Cain (April 12, 1825 – January 18, 1887) was an American minister, bishop, abolitionist and politician. After the American Civil War, he was appointed by Bishop Daniel Payne as a missionary of the African Methodist Episcopal Church in South Carolina. Cain served as a United States representative from South Carolina from 1873 to 1875 and 1877 to 1879. He also was one of the founders of Lincolnville, South Carolina.

== Early life and education ==
Cain was born to a black father and a Cherokee mother in Greenbrier County, Virginia, which is now in West Virginia. He was raised in Gallipolis, Ohio; Ohio state was a free state where he was allowed to learn to read and write. He attended Wilberforce University and divinity school in Hannibal, Missouri. The American Civil War broke out while he was at Wilberforce. He and 115 students from the historically black university attempted to enlist in the Union Army but were refused.

== Career ==
Cain worked as a barber in Galena, Illinois, and worked on steamboats along the Ohio River before he migrated to the South.

He had been licensed to preach for the Methodist Episcopal Church in 1844. His first assignment was in Hannibal, Missouri. In 1848, frustrated by the segregationist policies of the Methodists, he joined the African Methodist Episcopal Church, an independent black denomination started in Philadelphia. By 1859, he became a deacon in Muscatine, Iowa. In 1861, Cain was called as a pastor at the Bridge Street Church in Brooklyn, New York. In 1862, he was ordained as an elder and remained at the Brooklyn church until 1865.

After the Civil War, Cain moved to Charleston, South Carolina, in 1865 as superintendent of AME missions and presided over the Emmanuel Church in that city. The AME Church attracted tens of thousands of converts to its denomination very rapidly.

=== Politics ===
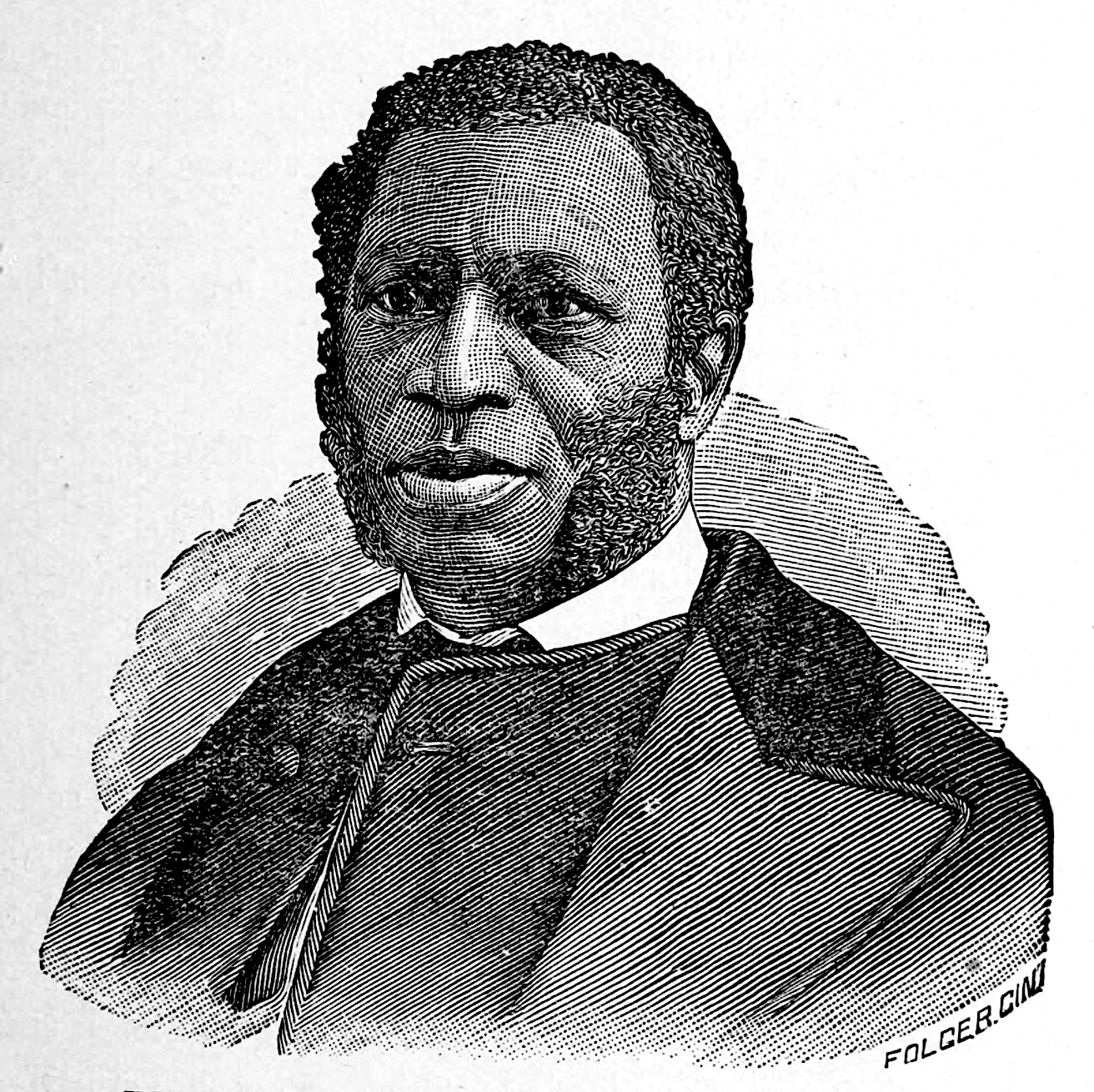
Engraving published 1891

Cain became active in politics, serving as a delegate to the state constitutional convention in 1868. He represented Charleston County in the South Carolina Senate from 1868 to 1872. He also edited the South Carolina Leader newspaper (later renamed the Missionary Record). As editor, he hired future congressmen Robert B. Elliott and Alonzo Ransier.

He was elected as a Republican to the 43rd United states Congress in a newly created at-large district. He was on the Committee on Agriculture, but focused more on the civil-rights bill that eventually passed, in diluted form, in 1875. He gave noted speeches on the bill in January 1873. He did not run for re-election in 1874 after redistricting, but ran for the 2nd district in 1876. He was elected to the 45th United States Congress.

In 1877, while advocating in Congress for mail service to West African colonies, Cain became a member of the Liberian Exodus Joint Stock Steamship Company. In 1880, Cain was elected and consecrated a bishop in the African Methodist Episcopal Church; he served the episcopal district that comprised Louisiana and Texas. He helped found Paul Quinn College and served as its president until 1884.

=== Bishop ===
Cain then moved to Washington, D.C., where he served as AME bishop over the Mid-Atlantic and New England states. He died in Washington on January 18, 1887, and was buried in Graceland Cemetery there, but may have been removed to Woodlawn Cemetery about a decade later, when Graceland closed and many of its interments were reburied in Woodlawn.

== See also ==
- List of African-American United States representatives
- African American officeholders from the end of the Civil War until before 1900

U.S. House of Representatives
Preceded by District created	Member of the U.S. House of Representatives from South Carolina's at-large congressional seat 1873-1875	Succeeded by District eliminated
Preceded by Charles W. Buttz	Member of the U.S. House of Representatives from South Carolina's 2nd congressional district 1877-1879	Succeeded by Michael P. O'Connor
Academic offices
Preceded by -	President of Paul Quinn College -1884	Succeeded by -
