= Joseph Humphrey Sloss =

American politician and lawyer (1826–1911)

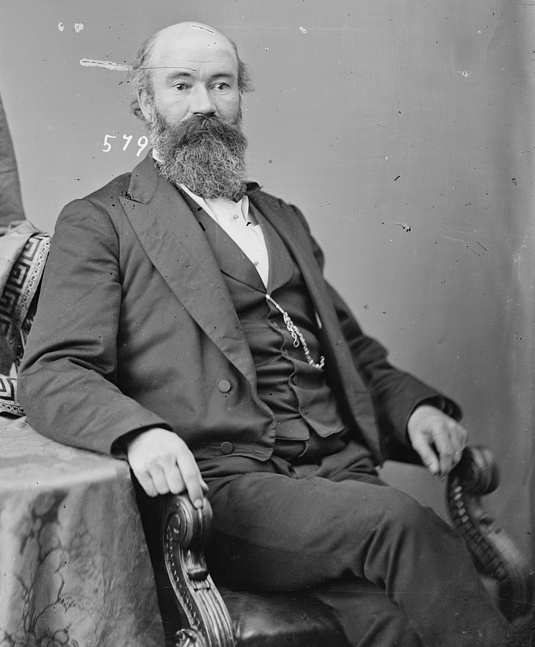
- Brady-Handy collection portrait of Sloss, taken between 1860 and 1880

Member of the U.S. House of Representatives from Alabama's 6th district
- In office March 3, 1871 – March 4, 1875
- Preceded by: William Crawford Sherrod
- Succeeded by: Goldsmith W. Hewitt

Member of the Illinois House of Representatives
- In office 1858–1859

Member of the Alabama Legislature
- In office 1860

Personal details
- Born: October 12, 1826 Somerville, Alabama, US
- Died: January 27, 1911 (aged 84) Memphis, Tennessee, US
- Resting place: Maple Hill Cemetery
- Party: Democratic
- Relations: Alexander Donelson Coffee (brother-in-law); Friend Smith Rutherford (brother-in-law); David Campbell (grandfather); Thomas Jefferson Campbell (uncle); James Sloss
- Children: 5
- Parent: James Long Sloss (father)
- Occupation: Politician, lawyer

Military service
- Allegiance: Confederate States of America
- Branch/service: Confederate States Army
- Rank: Major
- Unit: 4th Alabama Cavalry Regiment
- Battles/wars: American Civil War; Battle of Brice's Cross Roads; Battle of Selma

Joseph Humphrey Sloss (October 12, 1826 – January 27, 1911) was an American politician and lawyer. A Democrat, he was a member of the United States House of Representatives from Alabama.

Born in Somerville, Alabama to a political family, Sloss studied law. He moved to Illinois and served in its State House of Representatives. He then returned to Alabama during the American Civil War and joined the Confederate States Army. He stayed in Alabama after the war's end and represented the state in the House from 1871 to 1875, representing the state's 6th district.

== Early life, Illinois, and military service ==
Sloss was born on October 12, 1826, in Somerville, Alabama, one of five children born to Presbyterian minister James Long Sloss and Letitia (née Campbell) Sloss. His sister, Anne Eliza Sloss, married planter Alexander Donelson Coffee, while another sister, Letitia Vandyke Sloss, married military officer Friend Smith Rutherford. Through his mother, he was the grandson of judge David Campbell and the nephew of politician Thomas Jefferson Campbell. He was also related to businessman James Sloss.

In 1830, Sloss moved to Florence, where he received his education from his father. He furthered his education in Athens, Tennessee by reading law under his uncle, Thomas Jefferson Campbell. At age 18, he was admitted to the bar, after which he moved to St. Louis, practicing law there for three or four years.

Sloss moved to Edwardsville, Illinois in 1849. He practiced law there and worked in a partnership with his brother-in-law, Friend Smith Rutherford. A Democrat, he served in the Illinois House of Representatives in 1858 and 1859. In 1858, he was present at the Lincoln–Douglas debates, during which he supported Stephen A. Douglas. He was also captain of a military company while in Illinois.

At the onset of the American Civil War, Sloss, along with some members of his family, discreetly returned to Alabama, with him selling his Edwardsville property while in Carlyle. He joined the Confederate States Army, serving in Company F of the 4th Alabama Cavalry Regiment, under Phillip Roddey. He reached the rank of major, being promoted in 1863. He fought in the Battle of Brice's Cross Roads and the Battle of Selma, in 1864 and 1865, respectively. At one point, he was captured by the military company he had led in Illinois, which had become part of the Union army; they let him escape due to their respect for him. Near the close of war, he was an army recruiter in Tuscumbia.

== Return to Alabama ==
In 1860, Sloss was a member of the Alabama Legislature. After the war, he began practicing law in Tuscumbia, working in a partnership with Robert B. Lindsay from 1865 to 1871. In 1869, he represented a man named Collins, the alleged assassin of politician Thomas Haughey. Collins was not present at the trial, as he had been forcefuly removed from jail by masked men (presumed to have been members of the Ku Klux Klan), after which he was presumably lynched, with his body never being found.

Sloss was also the editor for The North Alabamian and Times and The Tuscumbia Times. He again pursued law, as well as the railroad industry. In 1866, he was elected mayor of Tuscumbia, though was removed from office by Union General John Pope due to suspicion of election fraud. He was re-elected, with local newspapers criticizing Pope for the decision. Sloss was one of the first of many politicians which Pope removed from office.

Sloss served in the United States House of Representatives from March 3, 1871, to March 4, 1875, representing Alabama's 6th district. He lost the following election. On February 10, 1877, he was appointed the United States Marshal for the United States District Court for the Northern District of Alabama. He lived in Huntsville during his tenure, and while there, also sold real estate and edited the Huntsville Advocate. On December 24, 1880, he got in an altercation with newspaper editor Frank Coleman over criticism Coleman wrote in the Huntsville Independent; they both fired their pistols during the fight, though nobody was shot. He resigned as Marshal on September 6, 1882, after being accused of misusing funds. For a time, he was clerk of the federal court in Huntsville.

== Political views ==
While in Congress, Sloss introduced multiple transportation bills, namely ones regarding Alabama railways and the Tennessee River. He also supported veteran relief and cutting taxes, such as when he introduced a bill which would have ended taxation of alcohol made solely of fruit. He also supported the Jim Crow laws.

The Huntsville Weekly Democrat described Sloss as a "Whig Republican". Among other members of the Democratic Party, he was respected for his public service. Though, he was criticized for incidents during his military service. He was also often accused of being unloyal to the Democratic Party for working with politicians of other parties, such as Republican Senator George E. Spencer.

== Personal life and death ==
On April 2, 1850, Sloss married Mary L. Lusk; they had five children together. One was daughter Mary Sloss Jr., who during the summer of 1874, was being courted by George F. Long, a local unemployed man who often got into fights. Due to his character, Sloss banned the two from being together. Long began criticizing Mary as a result, and Sloss returned to Tuscumbia. As Long passed by a general store which Sloss was inside, Sloss shot him through a window with his shotgun. He turned himself into the police, but was released due to his positive reputation in the community. Long recovered but retained health problems. In September of the same year, Mary eloped with Long. The mother, Mary Sr., crashed the wedding with two pistols in attempt to end it, but was too late. Mary Jr. later died on July 4, 1875, from tuberculosis.

Sloss owned a farm near Huntsville. He lived in Madison County as late as April 1900, and at some point moved to Memphis, Tennessee. He was a Presbyterian, as well as a member of the Freemasons and the Independent Order of Odd Fellows. He died on January 27, 1911, aged 84, in Memphis. He was buried at Maple Hill Cemetery, in Huntsville. An archive of his papers is unavailable, though some of his papers are held by the Alabama Department of Archives and History.

U.S. House of Representatives
Preceded by William Crawford Sherrod	Member of the U.S. House of Representatives from Alabama's 6th congressional district 1871-1875	Succeeded by Goldsmith W. Hewitt
