= Sherrod =

Sherrod is both a given name and a surname. Notable people with the name include:

== Given name ==
- Sherrod Brown (born 1952), United States Senator
- Sherrod Martin (born 1984), American football player
- Sherrod Small, American comedian
- Sherrod E. Skinner, Jr. (1929–1952), U.S. Marine and Medal of Honor recipient
- Sherrod Williams (1804–1876), U.S. Representative from Kentucky

== Surname ==
- Benjamin Sherrod (1777–1847), American cotton plantation "baron"
- Bud Sherrod (1927–1980), American football player
- Charles Sherrod (1937–2022), American civil rights activist
- Charles Sherrod Hatfield (1882–1950), judge of the United States Court of Customs and Patent Appeals
- Jaylyn Sherrod (born 2001), American basketball player
- Katie Sherrod, American journalist
- Matt Sherrod (born 1968), American drummer
- Rick Sherrod (born 1979), American football player
- Robert Sherrod (1909–1994), American journalist
- Shirley Sherrod (born 1948), a US government employee who was controversially forced to resign in 2010. See Resignation of Shirley Sherrod
- William Crawford Sherrod (1835–1919), American politician and Confederate officer from Alabama

== See also ==
- 117736 Sherrod, a main-belt asteroid
- Ben Sherod [sic], 1837 steamboat disaster
