= Sherred =

Sherred is a surname. Notable people with the surname include:

- Claire Sherred (born 1956), British luger
- T. L. Sherred (1915–1985), American science fiction writer

== See also ==
- Sherrod
