= List of shipwrecks in May 1837 =

The list of shipwrecks in May 1837 includes ships sunk, foundered, wrecked, grounded, or otherwise lost during May 1837.

== 1 May ==
List of shipwrecks: 1 May 1837
Ship	State	Description
Maria	Hamburg	The brig was wrecked on the Haaks Bank, in the North Sea off the Dutch coast with the loss of all hands. She was on a voyage from Tenerife, Canary Islands, Spain to Hamburg.
Perseverance	United Kingdom	The ship was destroyed by fire at Fowle's Point, Aberdeenshire.
Rambler	United States	The ship was wrecked on Caribou Island, in Lake Michigan. She was on a voyage from New York to Quebec City, Lower Canada, British North America.

== 2 May ==
List of shipwrecks: 2 May 1837
Ship	State	Description
Greyhound	(United Kingdom of Great Britain and Ireland) Saint Lucia	The drogher sloop was wrecked in Praslin Bay, Saint Lucia.

== 3 May ==
List of shipwrecks: 3 May 1837
Ship	State	Description
Carl Johan	Norway	The ship was in collision with Camilla (United Kingdom) and foundered in the English Channel off the Isle of Wight. Her crew were rescued. She was on a voyage from St. Ubes, Portugal to Bergen. The wreck was beached at Hastings, Sussex on 8 May.
Despatch	United Kingdom	The ship was driven ashore and wrecked at Alum Chine, Isle of Wight. She was on a voyage from Sunderland, County Durham to Poole, Dorset.
Maid of Galloway	United Kingdom	The ship was driven ashore near Port Patrick, Wigtownshire. She was on a voyage from Belfast, County Antrim to Whitehaven, Cumberland. Maid of Galloway was later refloated and resumed her voyage.

== 4 May ==
List of shipwrecks: 4 May 1837
Ship	State	Description
Oregon	United States	The whaler was driven ashore and wrecked at Tahite.
Three Betseys	United Kingdom	The ship ran aground on the Haisborough Sands, in the North Sea off the coast of Norfolk and was abandoned by her crew. She was later refloated and taken into Great Yarmouth, Norfolk.
William	United Kingdom	The collier, a brig, was run down and sunk in the River Thames at Gravesend, Kent by a steamship. The wreck was dispersed by gunpowder in November.

== 5 May ==
List of shipwrecks: 5 May 1837
Ship	State	Description
Probity	United Kingdom	The ship capsized and sank at Newcastle upon Tyne, Northumberland. She was refloated on 9 May.

== 6 May ==
List of shipwrecks: 6 May 1837
Ship	State	Description
Cleopatra	United Kingdom	The ship was driven ashore near "Rieserholt". She was on a voyage from London to Danzig.
Guadeloupe	Brazil	The ship was wrecked on the "Penta Careras". She was on a voyage from the Rio Grande to Montevideo, Uruguay.

== 8 May ==
List of shipwrecks: 8 May 1837
Ship	State	Description
Ben Sherrod	United States	The steamboat caught fire and was destroyed in the Mississippi River 30 miles (48 km) downstream of Natchez, Mississippi with the loss of about 150 lives. Some survivors were rescued by Columbus (United States). Ben Sherrod was on a voyage from New Orleans, Louisiana to Louisville, Kentucky.

== 9 May ==
List of shipwrecks: 9 May 1837
Ship	State	Description
Industry	United Kingdom	The ship was wrecked on the "Brandylon". Her crew were rescued. She was on a voyage from Saint John, New Brunswick, British North America to Philadelphia, Pennsylvania.

== 10 May ==
List of shipwrecks: 10 May 1837
Ship	State	Description
Catherine Christina	Norway	The ship was driven ashore near Biscarrosse, Landes, France. She was on a voyage from Fredrikstad to Paimbœuf, Loire-Inférieure.

=== 11 May ===
List of shipwrecks: 11 May 1837
Ship	State	Description
Britannia	United Kingdom	The ship was driven onto rocks at Rota, Spain. Britannia was refloated and put back to Cádiz. She was consequently condemned.

== 12 May ==
List of shipwrecks: 12 May 1837
Ship	State	Description
Vrow Margaretha	Netherlands	The ship was wrecked on the Saintes, off the French coast. She was on a voyage from Lisbon, Portugal to Rotterdam, South Holland.

== 13 May ==
List of shipwrecks: 13 May 1837
Ship	State	Description
Alcyon	France	The ship was wrecked on the coast of Madagascar.
John	United Kingdom	The ship was severely damaged by fire in Rostrevor Bay. She was on a voyage from Newry, County Antrim to Preston, Lancashire. John was later towed back to Newry.

== 14 May ==
List of shipwrecks: 14 May 1837
Ship	State	Description
Agnes	(United Kingdom of Great Britain and Ireland) Guernsey	The ship was driven ashore at Redcar, Yorkshire. She was refloated.
Cora	United Kingdom	The ship was driven ashore at Redcar. She was refloated.
Prince of Wales	United Kingdom	The ship was driven ashore at Redcar and was abandoned by her crew. She was later refloated and taken into Hartlepool, County Durham.

== 16 May ==
List of shipwrecks: 16 May 1837
Ship	State	Description
Cate	United States	The ship foundered off Cape San Antonio, Cuba. She was on a voyage from Trinidad to Baltimore, Maryland.
Thetis	United Kingdom	The ship foundered whilst on a voyage from London to Antigua. Eight of her crew were rescued.

== 17 May ==
List of shipwrecks: 17 May 1837
Ship	State	Description
Loire	France	The ship was driven ashore at Valparaíso, Chile. She was consequently condemned.

== 19 May ==
List of shipwrecks: 19 May 1837
Ship	State	Description
Jane	United Kingdom	The ship struck a ledge near the Runnel Stone and foundered. Her crew were rescued. She was on a voyage from Poole, Dorset to Liverpool, Lancashire.
Mary Halket	United Kingdom	The ship capsized in the Azov Sea 30 nautical miles (56 km) off Taganrog, Russia. Her crew were rescued.
William	United Kingdom	The ship was wrecked at Heisternest, Prussia with the loss of three of her eight crew. She was on a voyage from Danzig to London.

== 22 May ==
List of shipwrecks: 22 May 1837
Ship	State	Description
Boreas	United Kingdom	The brig collided with Richmond (United Kingdom) and foundered in the English Channel. Her crew were rescued by Richmond. Boreas was on a voyage from Guernsey, Channel Islands to London.
New Brunswick	(United Kingdom of Great Britain and Ireland) British North America	The ship ran ashore on Skagen, Denmark. She was refloated and put into Christiansand, Norway, where she sank on 24 May. She was on a voyage from Danzig to Saint John, New Brunswick. New Brunswick was later refloated, repaired and returned to service.
Socrates	United Kingdom	The ship was wrecked in the Bay of Honduras.

== 23 May ==
List of shipwrecks: 23 May 1837
Ship	State	Description
Monica	United Kingdom	The ship was driven ashore and wrecked at Brancaster, Norfolk with the loss of at least one life.

== 25 May ==
List of shipwrecks: 25 May 1837
Ship	State	Description
Mary	United Kingdom	The ship was wrecked on the Cargadoes Caragon Reef. Her crew were rescued. She was on a voyage from Mauritius to Calcutta, India.

== 27 May ==
List of shipwrecks: 27 May 1837
Ship	State	Description
Fate	United Kingdom	The ship ran aground at Helsingør, Denmark. She was refloated on 30 May.
Loire	France	The ship was driven ashore at Valparaíso, Chile. She was later refloated.
London	United Kingdom	The ship was wrecked on the White Island Reef, British North America. Her crew were rescued.
Wexford	United Kingdom	The ship was abandoned in the Atlantic Ocean. She was on a voyage from Ross-on-Wye, Herefordshire to Quebec City, Lower Canada, British North America. Wexford was towed in to Sydney, Nova Scotia, British North America on 13 June.

== 28 May ==
List of shipwrecks: 28 May 1837
Ship	State	Description
Delta	United Kingdom	The ship was lost off Barbuda. Her crew were rescued. She was on a voyage from London to Tenerife, Canary Islands and Jamaica.
Henry	United Kingdom	The ship ran aground and capsized at Newport, Monmouthshire. She was on a voyage from Cork to Newport.
Ruby	United Kingdom	The ship was driven ashore at "Nakkehead", Denmark. She was on a voyage from Newcastle upon Tyne, Northumberland to Saint Petersburg, Russia. Ruby was later refloated and taken in to Hornbeck Bay.

== 29 May ==
List of shipwrecks: 29 May 1837
Ship	State	Description
Ann	United Kingdom	The ship ran aground and was severely damaged at Milford Haven, Pembrokeshire.
Mariner	United Kingdom	The ship was wrecked on Egg Island, British North America. She was on a voyage from London to Quebec City, Lower Canada, British North America.

== 31 May ==
List of shipwrecks: 31 May 1837
Ship	State	Description
Elizabeth	United Kingdom	The ship ran aground in The Wash and was severely damaged. She was refloated and towed in to King's Lynn, Norfolk.
Eurotas	France	The steamship ran aground at Smyrna, Ottoman Empire. She was on a voyage from Smyrna to Syra, Greece and Marseille, Bouches-du-Rhône. Eurotas was refloated on 10 June with assistance from HMS Tribune (Royal Navy), a French navy Brig of War, an Ottoman Navy frigate, and two steamships.
Exmouth	United Kingdom	The barque was driven ashore at Gaspé, Lower Canada, British North America.
Favourite	United Kingdom	The ship capsized in St Andrews Bay. Her crew were rescued. She was on a voyage from Dundee, Forfarshire to Alloa, Clackmannanshire.

== Unknown date ==
List of shipwrecks: Unknown date in May 1837
Ship	State	Description
Eleanor	United Kingdom	The ship sank at Aberdeen.
Hannibal	United Kingdom	The ship was wrecked near Gaspé, Lower Canada, British North America. She was on a voyage from Newry, County Antrim to Quebec City, Lower Canada.
Pierre Antoine	France	The ship was wrecked near Camaret-sur-Mer, Finistère. She was on a voyage from Nantes, Loire-Inférieure to Ghent, Belgium.
Providence	United Kingdom	The smack was wrecked on the Splough Rock. Her crew were rescued.
Queen Adelaide	United Kingdom	The ship was abandoned in the Atlantic Ocean.
Rebecca	United Kingdom	The ship foundered in the Bay of Bengal off Ganjam, India in early May.
Sabantio	Grand Duchy of Tuscany	The brig was wrecked near "Marabout", Egypt.
Willem de Eerst	Netherlands	The ship was wrecked on the Saucepan Shoal, off the Turtle Islands. All on board, more than 150 people, survived.
William	United Kingdom	The ship was run down and sunk in the River Thames at Gravesend, Kent.
