= Norman's chart of the lower Mississippi River =

1858 U.S. map

Norman's Chart of the Lower Mississippi River
- Hand-colored lithographic map published in 1858.

Publication Details
- Cartographer: Marie Adrien Persac
- Publisher: Benjamin Moore Norman
- Engraver/Printer: J.H. Colton & Co.
- Date published: 1858
- Place of publication: New Orleans, Louisiana

Technical Characteristics
- Map type: Cadastral (plantation) map
- Medium: Hand-colored lithograph
- Scale: ca. 1:140,000

Geographical Coverage
- Region: Lower Mississippi River
- Extent: Natchez to New Orleans

Repository
- Location: Library of Congress Geography and Map Division
- Call number: G4042.M5G46 1858 .P4

After the American Civil War, the U.S. government produced this similar "Manuscript Map Showing Plantations Leased and Plantations Not Leased in Wilkinson, Adams, Clairborne and Jefferson Counties, Mississippi and Concordia and Tensas Parishes, Louisiana" (NAID 26465535)

Norman's chart of the lower Mississippi River is a historically significant map produced in 1858 of landmarks, roads, ferry crossings, and plantations along the course of the Mississippi River from Natchez to New Orleans. Cotton and sugar plantations are color-coded with distinct colors. The lithographic map is based on cartography by Marie Adrien Persac. The map was printed by longtime New Orleans bookseller Benjamin Moore Norman.

As one historian wrote, "At the time Norman's chart was published, the sugar coast stood prominently at the center of political power in Louisiana. Persac's inclusion of planters' names allows the viewer to navigate his chart as a map of concentrated power." Persac sailed the river in a skiff to collect information for the map, stopping frequently to inquire about names of plantations and plantation owners. According to Reconstructing the Landscapes of Slavery (2021), "It has the effect of a promenade along the river, displaying the bounty of nature transformed into capitalist wealth. This corridor was the nation's leading producer of cotton and sugar and had the densest slave population in the country. It was reputed to be home to more millionaires than anywhere else in the United States."

== See also ==
- Lloyd's Steamboat Directory
