= Anglo-Norman (steamboat) =

River steamboat in Louisiana, United States

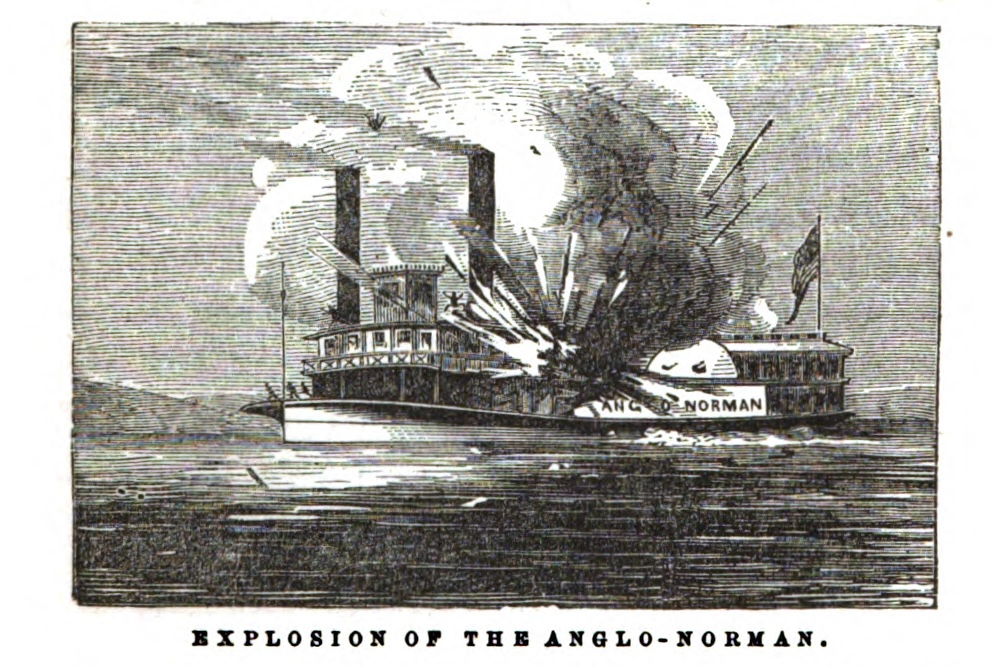
Explosion of the Anglo-Norman in 1850, from Lloyd's Steamboat Directory (1856)

The Anglo-Norman was a Mississippi River steamboat. The brand-new boat departed New Orleans on December 14, 1850, on a demonstration cruise but after a couple of hours on the water, as she turned around to head back to port, all her boilers exploded simultaneously. At least 100 people were killed. A newspaper writer who survived the explosion published an article about his experience entitled "The Experience of a Blown-up Man."
