= Benjamin Sherrod =

American capitalist (1777–1847)

Benjamin Sherrod (January 16, 1777 – February 25, 1847) was an American capitalist who owned cotton plantations and slaves in Lawrence County, Alabama, in the vicinity of the Tennessee River. He has been described as a "planter-baron."

== Biography ==
Sherrod was born in Halifax County, North Carolina, to Mary Ricks Copeland and Isaac Sherrod. His parents died when he was very young, and he was raised by an uncle or grandfather. He was educated at the College of William and Mary, and the University of North Carolina. Sherrod served in the War of 1812 as a quartermaster or commissary of North Carolina troops. He had bread ovens set up for the troops at every place they camped. He was politically a Whig (opposed to Andrew Jackson and Jacksonism).

He moved first to Georgia and then to the then-newly opened section of northern Alabama drained by the Tennessee River. He was remembered for his precise and careful agricultural systems used on the plantation he called Cotton Garden. He was unusual in his use of nitrogen-fixing clovers, and was remembered for burying a rotten split-rail fence that had to be replaced: "these poles were buried in deep furrows, and ridges for cotton thrown up over them, and for years afterward you could see how far the fertilizer went." He was a major investor in the Tuscumbia, Courtland and Decatur Railroad, which failed, leaving him $300,000 in debt, but "he managed to discharge this debt, and at his death to bequeath to each of his children a plantation stocked with slaves." Sherrod enslaved over 300 people as of 1830 and "may have been the state's largest slaveholder."

A river steamboat named Ben Sherrod was in operation by 1836 and plied the "western rivers," traveling between places like New Orleans, Natchez, Nashville, Louisville, and Tuscumbia, Alabama. In May 1837, reportedly while racing the steamboat Prairie, the Ben Sherrod caught fire just north of Fort Adams, Mississippi; the fire then spread and triggered explosions of alcohol and gunpowder in the cargo hold. Of the 200 people aboard, approximately 175 were killed in the fire, explosion, and immediate catastrophic sinking. The captain and his family survived. The burning, explosion, and sinking of the Ben Sherrod became one of the most infamous mass-casualty disasters of the 19th century United States, in part because it was re-reported in compilations like Lloyd's Steamboat Directory, and Disasters on the Western Waters.

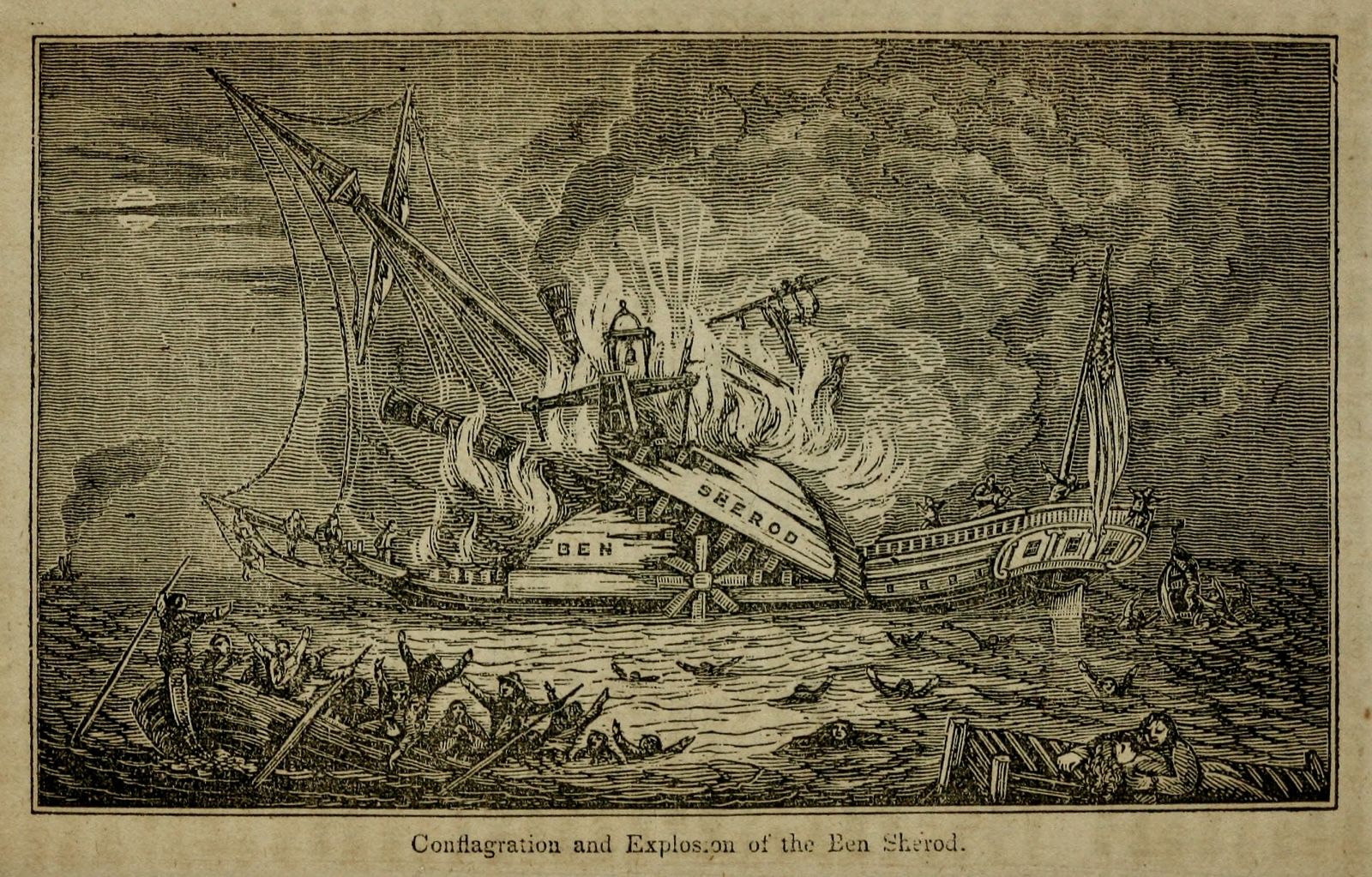
Dramatized depiction of the "conflagration and explosion of the Ben Sherod" (etching published 1846)

Sherrod's Cotton Garden is mentioned in an minister's essay about Alabama slavery that was included in American Slavery As It Is (1839), which was compiled by Theodore Dwight Weld, Angelina Grimké, and Sarah Moore Grimké.

Col. Ben Sherrod, another large planter in that neighborhood, is remarkable for his kindness to his slaves. He said to Rev. Mr. Barr, that he had no doubt he should be rewarded in heaven for his kindness to his slaves; and yet his overseer, Walker, had to sleep with loaded pistols, for fear of assassination. Three of the slaves attempted to kill him once, because of his treatment of their wives.

When Sherrod died in 1847 his estate consisted of 700 enslaved people and 15,000 acres of land in the Tennessee River valley. Sherrod is buried at Courtland Cemetery in Courtland, Alabama. His youngest son, William Crawford Sherrod, served one term in the U.S. Congress as a representative from Alabama.

== See also ==
- Joseph Wheeler Plantation
