= John Coffee =

American planter and Tennessee militia general (1772–1836)

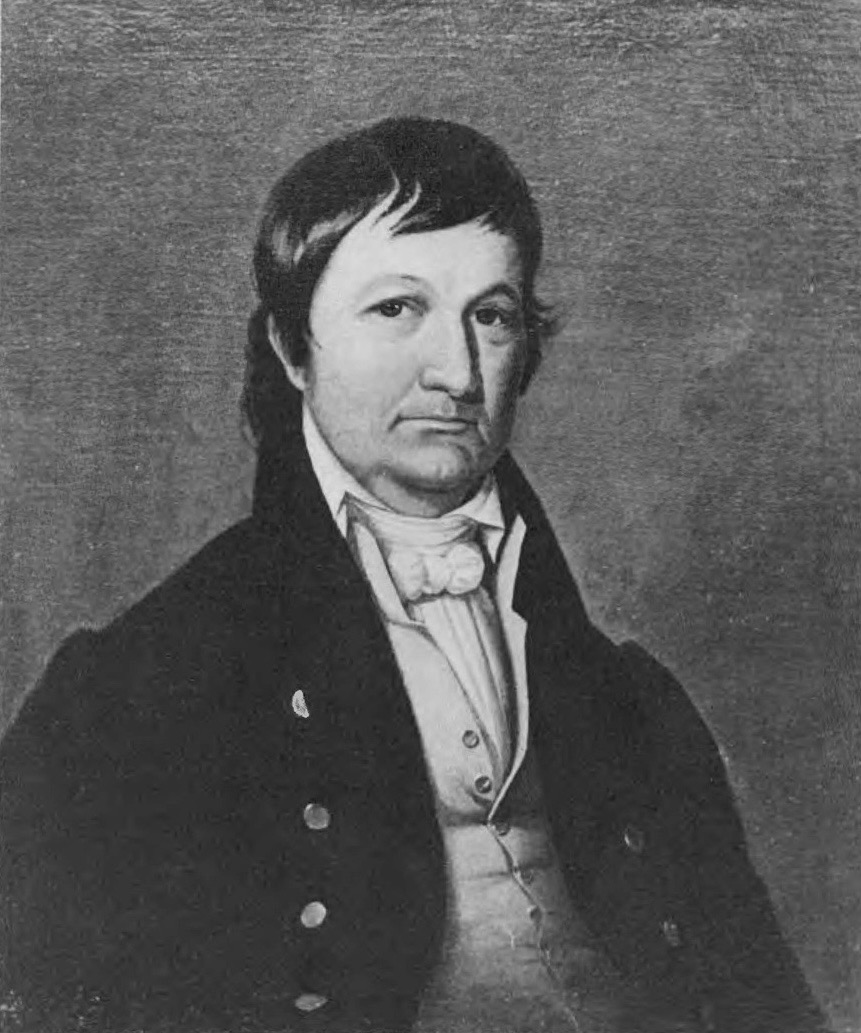
- John Coffee, portrait by unknown artist (Ladies' Hermitage Association)
- Born: June 2, 1772; Prince Edward County, Virginia
- Died: July 7, 1833 (aged 61); Florence, Alabama
- Spouse: Mary Donelson
- Children: Alexander Donelson Coffee; Andrew Jackson Coffee
- Military career
- Allegiance: United States
- Branch: Tennessee Militia
- Rank: Brigadier general
- Conflicts: Creek War; Battle of Tallushatchee; Battle of Talladega; Battles of Emuckfaw and Enotachopo Creek; Battle of Horseshoe Bend; War of 1812; Battle of New Orleans

John R. Coffee (June 2, 1772 – July 7, 1833) was an American planter and a state militia brigadier general in Tennessee. He commanded troops under General Andrew Jackson during the Creek War of 1813–14 and the Battle of New Orleans in the War of 1812.

While president, Jackson appointed Coffee as his representative, along with Secretary of War John Eaton, to negotiate treaties with Southeast American Indian tribes to accomplish removal to the west of the Mississippi River and extinguish their land claims. This policy was authorized by Congressional passage of the Indian Removal Act of 1830. Coffee negotiated the Treaty of Dancing Rabbit Creek of 1830 with the Choctaw, by which they ceded their lands. He started negotiations with the Chickasaw, but they did not conclude a treaty with the United States until after his death.

== Family ==
Born in Prince Edward County, Virginia, Coffee was the son of Joshua Coffee (January 26, 1745 – September 8, 1797) and Elizabeth Graves (January 28, 1742 – December 13, 1804). They were both of English descent.

Coffee's immigrant ancestor, also Joshua Coffee, was released from the Old Bailey in London and "transported" in 1730 as an indentured servant to Virginia. He worked in the tobacco fields for 14 years, finally gaining freedom in 1744. He later served as a captain in the colonial militia.

== Marriage and family ==
John Coffee married Mary Donelson on October 3, 1809. She was the daughter of Captain John Donelson III and Mary Purnell. One of her paternal aunts was Rachel Jackson, who had married Andrew Jackson in 1794 as a young divorcee of Robards. He was elected President of the United States in 1828.

Coffee and Andrew Jackson were in business together. Before Coffee's marriage, Jackson sold his partnership in their joint merchandising business to Coffee. He took promissory notes for the sale. After Coffee married, Jackson gave Coffee the notes as his wedding present to the couple.

== Career ==
Coffee was a merchant, land speculator, and surveyor. He was considered the most even-tempered and least selfish of Jackson's lifelong friends. Described as a big, awkward man, careless of dress, and slow of speech, Coffee was also said to be kindly, tactful, and wise. In 1800, he traded a 14-year-old enslaved girl named Susana for 175 pecks of salt in Ste. Genevieve, Missouri.

In early 1806, Coffee challenged Nathaniel A. McNairy to a duel for publishing derogatory statements about Jackson. The duel occurred on March 1, 1806, over the Tennessee line in Kentucky. McNairy unintentionally fired before the "word", wounding Coffee in the thigh. In return, McNairy offered to lay down his pistol and give Coffee an extra shot. The weapons used in this duel were also used in the Jackson–Dickinson duel on May 30, 1806.

== Militia service in the War of 1812 ==
At the beginning of the War of 1812, Coffee raised the 2nd Regiment of Volunteer Mounted Riflemen, composed mostly of Tennessee militiamen (and a few men from Alabama). In December 1812, Governor Willie Blount had called out the Tennessee militia in response to a request from General James Wilkinson and the U.S. Secretary of War. Under Jackson's command, Coffee participated in the Natchez Expedition, leading 600 men in January 1813 to Natchez, Mississippi Territory, via the Natchez Trace. They reached it ahead of the other troops, who traveled via flatboats on the major rivers. After the two groups reunited in Natchez, Wilkinson and the U.S. government disbanded Jackson's troops. They returned to Nashville, reaching it on May 18, 1813. On September 4, 1813, Coffee was involved in the Andrew Jackson–Benton brothers fight in Nashville. He knocked Thomas Benton down a flight of stairs after Benton failed to hit Jackson, who was brawling with Jesse Benton Jr. In October 1813, the 2nd Regiment was combined with Colonel Cannon's Mounted Regiment and the 1st Regiment of Volunteer Mounted Gunmen to form a militia brigade of mounted infantry. Coffee was promoted to brigadier-general and placed in command.

=== Raid at Black Warrior's town ===
American commander Andrew Jackson sent Coffee to raid Black Warrior's Town, near a Muscogee tribal town near present-day Tuscaloosa, Alabama, on October 11, 1813. Coffee found the village abandoned. Coffee and his troops collected 300 bushels of corn, burned the village town, and withdrew to join the main American body.

=== Battle of Tallushatchee ===
Jackson chose General Coffee as his advance commander in the Creek War (concurrent with the War of 1812), during which he commanded mostly state militia and allied Native Americans. Under Jackson, Coffee led his brigade at the Battle of Tallushatchee. John Coffee set out with 900 mounted riders, including the Tennessee mounted gunmen. John Coffee and his mounted force surrounded the Indian town of Tallushatchee, with the Indians oblivious. A small detachment of mounted Americans led by Captain Hammond moved into plain view and opened fire. The Redstick Indians, who were primarily armed with bows and clubs, seeing only a group of horse-mounted Americans, all charged out of their defensive positions to attack the American riders. Coffee's detachment feigned a retreat, drawing the Indian Warriors into the open. The Americans surrounding the village opened heavy fire. The Americans, including the American horse riders led by Captain Hammon, charged/closed in, tightening their circle and cornering the Indians. The Indians lost 186 killed, and a number women and children. The Americans lost 5 killed and 41 wounded. Coffee's force took many prisoners, including women and children. John Coffee and his forces withdrew back to Fort Strother.

=== Battle of Talladega ===
John Coffee took part in the Battle of Talladega. A friendly pro-American village was under attack by a large army of enemy Indians. Andrew Jackson came to relieve the friendly town with 1,200 infantry and 800 cavalry. Andrew Jackson thought of an ingenious plan. Andrew Jackson ordered his light infantry militia to the left flank, his light infantry volunteers to the right flank, and the rest of his mounted troops to the further flanks. Andrew Jackson sent three companies of mounted horse riders under Colonel Carroll to feint a mounted attack and then feign retreat. The trap worked, and the enemy charged, pursuing the horse-mounted American riders. The enemy was surrounded and ensnared in a lethal crossfire, but 700 enemy Indians escaped through a gap. The Americans decimated the Indians. The enemy Indians suffered 299 killed and 110 wounded. Andrew Jackson suffered only 14 killed and 81 wounded. Andrew Jackson and his victorious forces withdrew back to Fort Strother.

=== Battles of Emuckfaw and Enotachopo Creek ===
He was seriously wounded in the Battles of Emuckfaw and Enotachopo Creek. On January 22, 1814, Jackson was encamped about 12 miles (19 km) from Emuckfaw. At dawn, a strong force of Red Sticks camped 3 miles (4.8 km) away and attacked Jackson's position but were driven off after about thirty minutes. Jackson sent Coffee with a force of 400 to burn the Indian camp. Upon seeing the strength of their position, Coffee did not attack and returned to Jackson's position. The Red Sticks attacked again. Coffee was seriously wounded when he led a small party to turn their flank. The Creek were driven off with a loss of 54 killed. At this point, Jackson had no choice but to retreat to Fort Strother. Because of the difficulty of the earlier crossing of the Emuckfaw Creek, Jackson took a longer route back to Fort Strother. Even so, the crossing was difficult. On the morning of January 24, 1814, he began to re-cross the creek. When Jackson's artillery was about to enter the ford, alarm shots sounded in the woods. Having anticipated an attack, Jackson had ordered his advance guard to counterattack and attempt an envelopment. The rear guard panicked and retreated. For unknown reasons, the Red Sticks could not take advantage of the situation, and a handful of defenders drove them off. Jackson's losses for the two engagements were 24 killed and 71 wounded. The Creek's casualties were 54 killed and an unknown number of wounded. Andrew Jackson and his force withdrew back to Fort Strother.

=== Battle of Horseshoe Bend ===
Andrew Jackson arrived at the last Red Stick village base at Horseshoe bend with 2,000 American infantry, 700 American cavalry, some artillery, 500 Cherokee allies, and Lower Creek allies. There were 1,000 Red Stick warriors making their stand at Horseshoe Bend. The Red Stick base was on a peninsula semi-surrounded by a river with the only land exit at a narrow, slim neck. The Red Stick made breastwork on the narrow, slim neck. John Coffee and his mounted men circled downriver to cut off anyone who tried to escape. The militia and regulars would lead the main attack. At the slim neck, the Indians formed a log breastwork barricade. The American cannons did minor damage to the breastwork. But John Coffee, his mounted men, and pro-American Indians had snuck around successfully to the rear of the Red Stick camp and opened heavy fire. The Red Sticks behind the front breastwork diverted much of their troops to the rear to combat Coffee's combined force of mounted men and Indians. The American militia and Regulars swarmed the weakened front of the barricade breastwork. Both sides fired through loopholes at each other, took cover behind their side of the barricades, and attacked each other in melee combat. As the militia and regulars overran the front, the Red Sticks fled to the river rear, being shot down by Coffee's mounted riflemen on the outside bank. Wounded Red Stick warriors hiding in the underbrush were dispatched with bayonets and tomahawks.

The Americans gathered the Red Stick women and children and secured them. The Americans found 557 dead Red Stick warriors, while an estimated 300 Red Stick warriors were drowned in the river rear. Some 300 women and an unknown number of children were marched toward Fort Talladega to be enslaved by Cherokee and friendly Creeks loyal to the American cause.

Andrew Jackson adopted an orphaned Creek child whose parents had been killed at the Battle of Tallusahatchee; the baby was named Lyncoya. Later, Red Stick leader William Weatherford surrendered to the Americans. The Creek Warriors lost 800 killed and 206 wounded. The Americans lost 47 killed and 159 wounded. The Native American allies of the Americans lost 23 killed and 47 wounded. So the Americans and their allies lost 70 killed and 206 wounded in total.

=== Battle of New Orleans ===
Coffee led his brigade, which included free blacks and Native American warriors from allied Southeast tribes, at the 1814-15 Battle of New Orleans. They played a crucial role in holding the woods to the east of the British column. Coffee's brigade was the first to engage the British, firing from behind the trees and brush.

== Later life ==
As payment for his service in the War of 1812, Coffee was granted 2,000 acres of land in Murfreesboro, TN, which he later deeded to his sister Mary. Later, after some failed investments, Coffee began working as a surveyor. In 1816, he surveyed the boundary line between Alabama Territory and Mississippi Territory. Government surveyors such as Coffee made a lucrative business out of selling information to land speculators: Coffee made sure to collect half the proceeds his clerks earned selling information to those seeking land. He himself was a prodigious land speculator, and was a founding member of the Cypress Land Company. He later moved near Florence, Alabama. He may have had a plantation in Tensas Parish, Louisiana "opposite Grand Gulf."

Jackson was elected President in 1828. Jackson worked toward the removal of Southeast Native American tribes to lands west of the Mississippi River. He appointed Coffee as his representative, along with Secretary of War John Eaton, to negotiate treaties to accomplish extinguishing Native American land claims and their removal. The policy was authorized by the Congressional passage of the Indian Removal Act of 1830.

Coffee negotiated the Treaty of Dancing Rabbit Creek of 1830 with the Choctaw by which they ceded their Southeastern lands. Coffee started negotiations with the Chickasaw, but the U.S. did not conclude a treaty with these people until after his death.

Coffee died in Florence on July 7, 1833, at age 61. The reported cause was a "disease of the chest" contracted the previous winter.

== Legacy and honors ==
Coffee County, Alabama, Coffee County, Tennessee, Coffee County, Georgia and the towns of Coffeeville, Alabama, Coffee Springs, Alabama (now in Geneva County but formerly part of Coffee County), Coffeeville, Mississippi, and Fort Coffee, Oklahoma, are named in his honor. The Natchez Trace Parkway bridge across the Tennessee River near Florence, Alabama, is also named after Coffee.

== Research notes ==
Researchers often confuse General John Coffee with his first cousin John E. Coffee (1782–1836). He served as a general in the Georgia militia and was elected as the U.S. Congressman from there.

General Coffee is sometimes referred to as John R. Coffee. Some researchers have attempted to document the use of this middle initial in sources. To date, he has been found to have signed his name only as John Coffee in the original papers examined. Scholars believe he did not use the middle initial.

General John (R.) Coffee is buried in the Coffee Cemetery, now off State Road 157, northwest of Florence, Alabama.

The legendary Texas Ranger, John Coffee Hays, was a cousin of Mrs. Mary Coffee and named after her husband.
