= Andrew Jackson Coffee =

American army officer and paymaster (1819–1891)

- Born: August 20, 1819; Near Nashville, Tennessee, U.S.
- Died: March 11, 1891 (aged 71); San Francisco, California, U.S.
- Relatives: John Coffee (father); Alexander Donelson Coffee (brother)
- Military career
- Allegiance: United States
- Branch: United States Army
- Service years: 1846–1859
- Rank: Major; brevet lieutenant colonel
- Conflicts: Mexican–American War; Battle of Buena Vista

Andrew Jackson Coffee (August 20, 1819 – March 11, 1891) was a United States Army officer and paymaster during and after the Mexican–American War. He served with General Zachary Taylor at the Battle of Buena Vista and received a brevet promotion to lieutenant colonel for his conduct in the battle. He later served on the Pacific Coast before resigning from the army in 1859.

== Early life and education ==
Coffee was born near Nashville, Tennessee, on August 20, 1819, to John Coffee and Mary Donelson Coffee. He was named for Andrew Jackson, a friend of his father and a relative through his mother's family. Coffee attended the University of Nashville. In 1834, Jackson, then president of the United States, arranged an appointment for him to the United States Military Academy at West Point.

A later academy register lists entries for Andrew J. Coffee in both 1835 and 1837. He left West Point without graduating and subsequently worked as a civil engineer.

== Army career ==
Coffee was appointed an additional paymaster in the United States Army on June 24, 1846, and a paymaster on February 23, 1847. During the Mexican–American War, he served as an additional aide-de-camp to Taylor at the Battle of Buena Vista. He received a brevet promotion to lieutenant colonel, dated February 23, 1847, for gallantry and meritorious conduct in the battle. After the battle, he carried Taylor's dispatches from the army's camp to Monterrey.

Coffee subsequently held army assignments in Texas and Louisiana. He was assigned to the Pacific Coast in 1853, with headquarters in San Francisco, and resigned from the army in July 1859.

== Personal life and death ==
Coffee married Elizabeth A. Hutchings of Huntsville, Alabama, on April 3, 1839. They had five children, including a son also named Andrew Jackson Coffee. In an 1849 letter to his brother Alexander Donelson Coffee, he offered to buy an enslaved woman, Emily, and her daughter, and advised his brother about selling an enslaved man, Henry.

Coffee later lived in California and worked as a notary public. He died at his residence in San Francisco on March 11, 1891.
