= William Crawford Sherrod =

American politician (1835–1919)

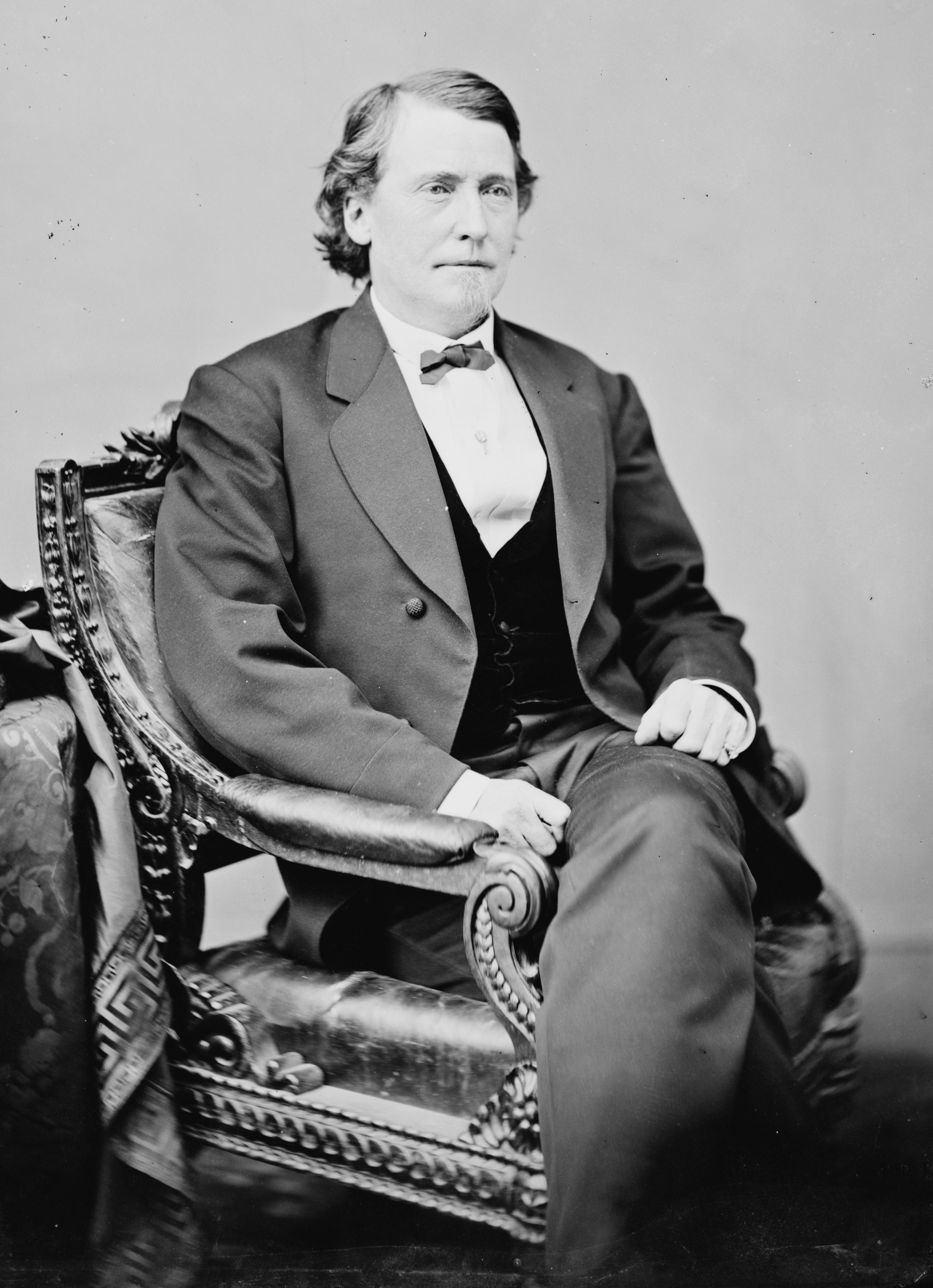

Member of the U.S. House of Representatives from Alabama's 6th district
- In office March 4, 1869 – March 3, 1871
- Preceded by: Thomas Haughey
- Succeeded by: Joseph Humphrey Sloss

Member of the Alabama State Legislature

Personal details
- Born: August 17, 1835
- Died: March 24, 1919 (aged 83)
- Resting place: Riverside Cemetery, Wichita Falls, Texas
- Party: Democratic
- Education: University of North Carolina at Chapel Hill

William Crawford Sherrod (August 17, 1835 – March 24, 1919) was an American politician and Confederate officer from Alabama. He attended the University of North Carolina at Chapel Hill. Afterward, he was a planter and served as a Delegate to the Democratic National Convention from Alabama in 1860. He was also a delegate to the Charleston convention of 1860.

Sherrod was a Unionist and failed to support the move for secession. Sherrod nevertheless served in the Confederate Army in the cavalry, as a Colonel under the command of Nathan Bedford Forrest. After the conclusion of the American Civil War, he served in the United States Congress in the House (1869–1871). After that, he served in the Alabama legislature.

== 1860 Democratic National Convention ==
William Crawford Sherrod wrote the following notes about his involvement in the Charleston Convention of 1860 and his service during the Civil War:

"I was a member of the Charleston Democratic convention which convened in 1860; this was a very important period for the South, and the nation as well. I was a member of the Alabama legislature being 28 years of age, and at the time was made a delegate to the State Convention held at Montgomery and there made a delegate to the National Convention that was held at Charleston, SC.

"The Alabama convention directed its delegation to withdraw from the convention in the event of the convention refusing to guarantee the right of persons to carry their slaves into the Territories, and they demanded that the government should protect them in so doing. This was not in accordance with the views of Stephen Douglas on the subject of slavery. Mr. Douglas was the foremost candidate before the convention for the presidency -- he advocated the doctrine of "Squatter Sovereignty," with which I entirely agreed and endorsed Mr. Douglas' candidacy, but could do him but little good, as I believed that a state convention had a right to instruct its delegates, which instructions I obeyed to the letter.

"The delegates failing to get a plank endorsing the Alabama views, agreed to by the Committee on Platforms, withdrew, I think it was on the 23rd day of April, from the convention. We all returned to Alabama. There was a division of the delegations as soon as the withdrawal was accomplished; about one-third of the delegates favored by Mr. Douglas, and the idea of Squatter-sovereignty, and the other two-thirds demanded unconditional protection; one set of delegates were called "Secessionists." The other set "Submissionists." The Secessionists called a convention to meet at Montgomery, Alabama, and the Submissionists called a convention to meet at Selma, Alabama.

"Both conventions sent delegates; the Secessionists to Richmond, VA, the Submissionists to Baltimore, Maryland, where the regular Democratic convention had adjourned at Charleston to meet at Baltimore.

"So far as I am advised, I am the only living delegate who was at the convention. I could not attend the Baltimore Convention with others who were appointed at Selma. the other delegates who were at Montgomery were appointed to Richmond. The Richmond Convention ultimately adjourned and met at the same time as the other convention at Baltimore, but there were two separate conventions. Douglas was nominated immediately by the regular convention, and Breckenridge by the seceding convention; then, the warmest political canvas imaginable was inaugurated in Alabama. I was still a member of the Alabama legislature and the governor issued a call for a special session of the legislature which met at the same time that the secession convention met at Montgomery. The Secession convention formed a government known as the "Southern Confederacy."

"I did not think it best for the South to secede and with two other members never signed the ordinance of secession. I believed that we would have a war that would be disastrous to the South and our best young men would all be sacrificed and the property of the South, which consisted mostly of negroes, would be lost. I had no idea at any time of separating myself from the South, preferring to be with them believing them to be wrong than to be with the Northern army knowing it to be right.

"At the beginning of the war I was engaged in special service most of the time. I was in the last battle East of the Mississippi River which was fought after both Lee and Johnson surrendered. General Forrest, with whose command I was attached, fought General Wilson with about four thousand Confederates; the Federals having ten thousand as fine cavalry as ever followed any command in the line of battle. The last command that I ever received came from General Bedford Forrest in person at the battle of Selma which was to have all the dry grass removed from the breast-works; that it would catch on fire whenever the fire became hot, and smoke us out."

== Military service ==
During the Civil War Sherrod served as a colonel under Gen. N.B. Forrest in the Confederate Army. Record of William Crawford Sherrod's military service in the Civil War:

Cavalry:

Sherrod, W. C. -- 5th Regt. Ala. Cav. Act'g Ass't Commissary Subsistence

Organization of Brig. Gen. Roddey's Cav. Command November 20, 1864

== Return to politics ==
Sherrod was a member of the 41st United States Congress representing Alabama's 5th District from March 1869 to March 1871. In his Congressional record, we find that the Southern Pacific Railroad bill was turned over to him after it had been abandoned by all others, and that it was placed in his hands at the special request of Gen. Freemont.

Col. Sherrod knew almost intimately every leading man in the 41st Congress and was upon terms of amity with them without regard to politics. To his credit, it may be said that he had at all times labored to promote and rebuild the country, and that he participated not in political discussions.

In 1879 William Crawford Sherrod represented the Second Senatorial district in the upper house of the Alabama State Legislature and as a member of the finance Committee assisted in framing the revenue bill that piloted the state out of its indebtedness. He came to Florence in June 1883 for the purpose of schooling his children. In June 1886 in connection with W.B. Wood formulated the idea of the Florence Boom. He was one of the originators of the Florence Land & Mining Company, of the W.B. Wood Furnace Co., of which he is Vice President, also of the Florence Coal Coke & Iron Co., of the Florence Tuscaloosa & RR Co., of the Tennessee and Alabama RR Co., the Alabama, Florence & Cincinnati RR Co., the Florence & St. Louis RR Co., in all of which he is of the several board of directors.

== Personal life ==
Sherrod was the youngest son of "planter-baron" Benjamin Sherrod. He was married at Nashville, Tennessee, October 21, 1856, to Miss Amanda Morgan, the accomplished daughter of Samuel Dold Morgan, whose body lies in the Tennessee Capitol building, by order of the Tennessee Legislature.

U.S. House of Representatives
Preceded by Thomas Haughey	Member of the U.S. House of Representatives from Alabama's 6th congressional district 1869-1871	Succeeded by Joseph Humphrey Sloss
