= Thomas Haughey =

American politician (1826–1869)

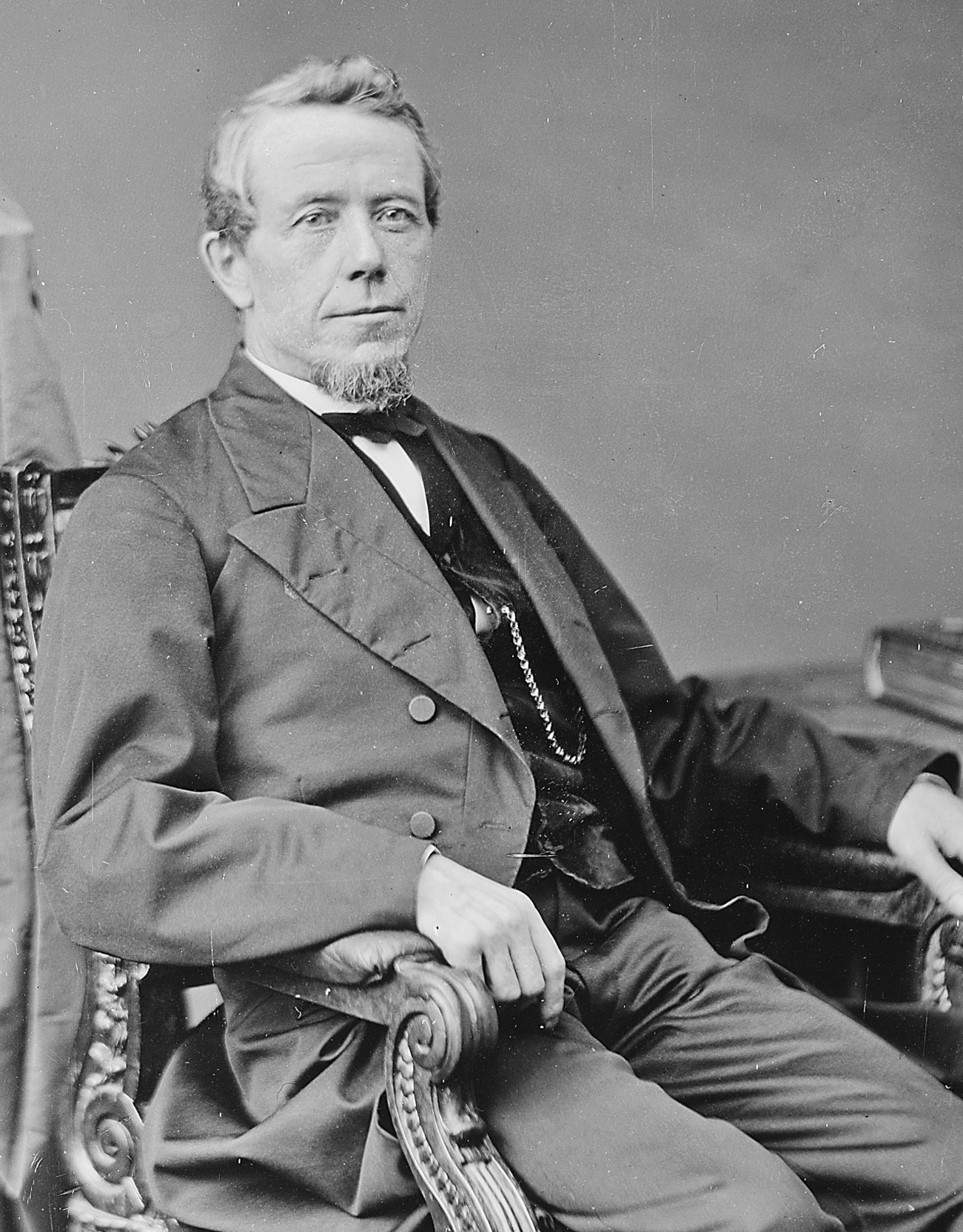

Member of the U.S. House of Representatives from Alabama's 6th district
- In office July 21, 1868 – March 3, 1869
- Preceded by: Williamson Robert Winfield Cobb
- Succeeded by: William Crawford Sherrod

Personal details
- Born: 1826 Glasgow, Scotland
- Died: August 5, 1869 (aged 42–43) Courtland, Alabama, U.S.
- Cause of death: Assassination
- Party: Republican
- Education: Tulane University (MD)

Military service
- Allegiance: United States • Union
- Branch/service: United States Army • Union Army
- Years of service: 1862–1865
- Battles/wars: American Civil War

Thomas Haughey (1826 – August 5, 1869) was a surgeon who served as U.S. representative for Alabama from 1868 until 1869, shortly before his assassination. A supporter of another Republican candidate assassinated him during his re-election campaign.

== Early life and education ==
Born near Glasgow, Scotland, Haughey received a limited education. He immigrated with his father to the United States, where they settled in New York City. In 1841, he moved to Jefferson County, Alabama. While teaching in St. Clair County, he studied medicine. Haughey attended New Orleans Medical College and graduated as both a physician and surgeon in 1858, starting a medical practice in Elyton.

== Career ==
During the onset of the Civil War, Haughey was against both war and secession and was sympathetic to the North and the plight of slaves. He did not hide his views and joined the Union League, but soon fled to Kentucky due to threats to his safety. Once there, he joined the Union Army's 3rd Regiment Tennessee Volunteer Infantry as a surgeon, serving from January 1862 to his honorable discharge on February 23, 1865, when the regiment was mustered out. After the war, he resumed his medical practice in Decatur, Alabama.

=== Politics ===
He served as delegate to the State constitutional convention in 1867. Upon the readmission of the State of Alabama to representation, Haughey was elected as a Republican to the 40th US Congress. He served from July 21, 1868, to March 3, 1869. After returning to Alabama, Haughey began a campaign for reelection, giving speeches throughout the district. Running as an Independent Republican, his opponents were regular Republican candidate Jerome J. Hinds, a protégé of Senator George E. Spencer, and Democrat William Crawford Sherrod.

The race was intense with accusations of theft, bribery, corruption, and perjury between the candidates.

== Death ==
At a speech before a crowd at the courthouse in Courtland, Alabama, on July 31, Haughey came into a confrontation with a man named Collins, an ally of Hinds who espoused the cause of his Republican opponent. When Haughey was said to have been obnoxious toward Collins, a man known to be prone to violence, a fistfight ensued. The altercation ended when Collins pulled a pistol and fired it into Haughey's stomach. Confined to a bed, Haughey lingered on for five days before succumbing to his wounds on August 5, 1869, at age 43. He was interred in Green Cemetery near Pinson, Alabama.

== See also ==
- List of assassinated American politicians
- List of members of the United States Congress killed or wounded in office
- List of members of the United States Congress who died in office (1790–1899)

U.S. House of Representatives
Preceded by Williamson Robert Winfield Cobb	Member of the U.S. House of Representatives from Alabama's 6th congressional district 1868–1869	Succeeded by William Crawford Sherrod
