= Friend Smith Rutherford =

American lawyer (1820–1864)

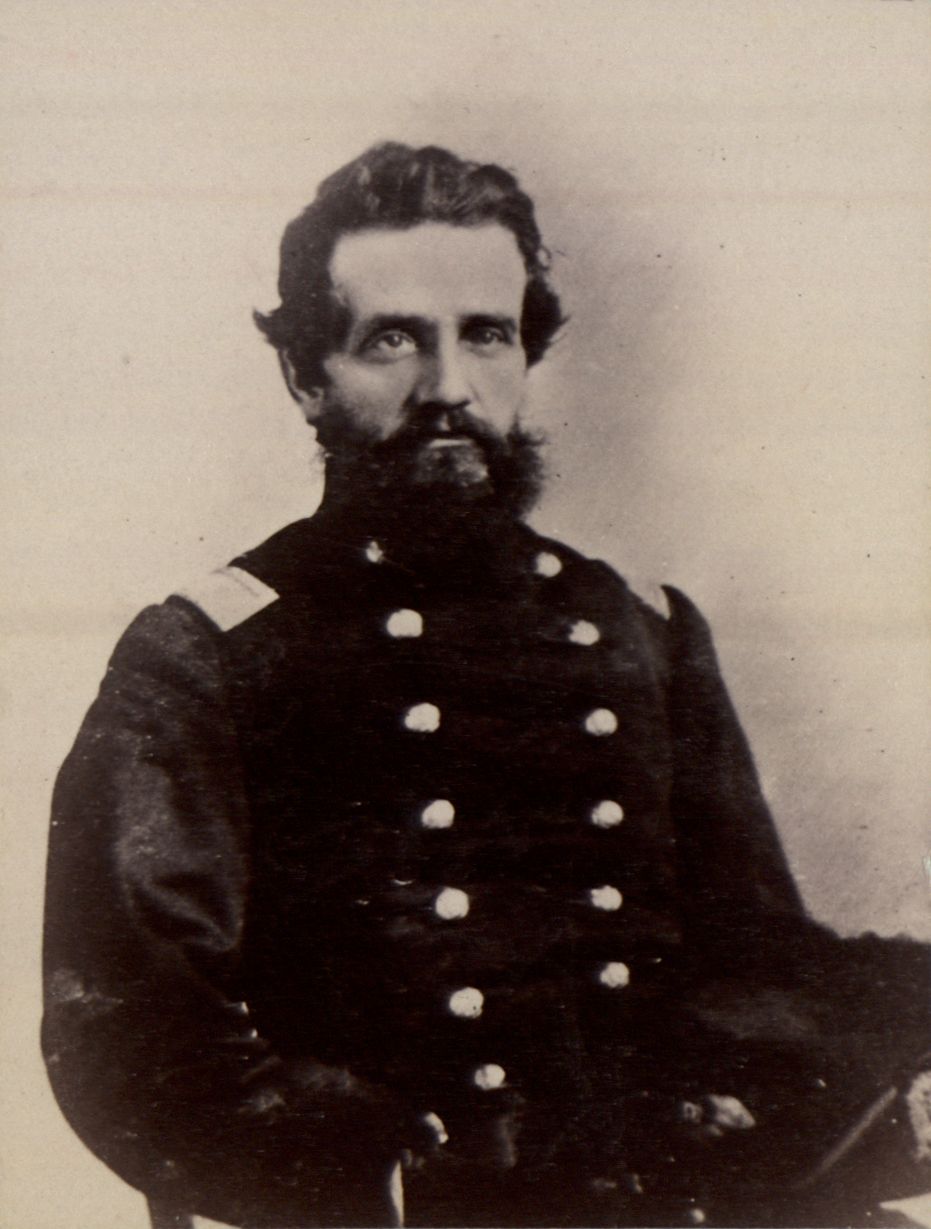
- Born: September 25, 1820; Schenectady, New York
- Died: June 20, 1864 (aged 43); Alton, Illinois
- Burial place: Alton, Illinois
- Military career
- Allegiance: United States
- Branch: Union Army
- Service years: 1862–1864
- Rank: Colonel; Brigadier General
- Commands: 97th Illinois Infantry Regiment
- Conflicts: American Civil War; Battle of Chickasaw Bayou (1862); Battle of Arkansas Post (1863); Battle of Port Gibson (1863); Battle of Champion Hill (1863); Battle of Big Black River (1863); Siege of Vicksburg (1863)

Friend Smith Rutherford (September 25, 1820 – June 20, 1864) was an American military officer who was colonel and posthumously appointed brigadier general in the Union Army during the American Civil War. He commanded the 97th Illinois Infantry Regiment during the Vicksburg campaign. On June 18, 1864, President Abraham Lincoln nominated Rutherford for appointment to the grade of brigadier general of volunteers and the United States Senate confirmed the appointment on June 28, 1864. Rutherford's appointment was dated June 27, 1864, and it was to rank from June 28, 1864. His appointment was made and commission issued without knowledge of his death on June 20, 1864. Since Rutherford had died, the confirmation technically could not be given and the commission could not become effective. Nonetheless, several sources list Rutherford as a Union Army general, although historian Ezra Warner does not.

== Early life ==
Friend Smith Rutherford was the great-grandson of Doctor Daniel Rutherford, a Scottish physician, chemist and botanist who is known for the isolation of nitrogen which he described in his M.D. dissertation at the University of Edinburgh in 1772.

Friend Smith Rutherford was born on September 25, 1820, in Schenectady, New York. His parents were Alexander Rutherford (1794–1849) and Sally (Clifford) Rutherford (1797–1875). He had four siblings: Dr Joseph Chase Rutherford (1818–1902), Reuben Clifford Rutherford (1823–1895), Rebecca Fifield Rutherford (1825–1880) and George Valentine Rutherford (1830–1876). Reuben Clifford Rutherford and George Valentine Rutherford were appointment brevet brigadier generals of volunteers for their service in the Union Army during the American Civil War.

Friend Smith Rutherford married Letitia VanDyke Sloss of Florence, Alabama, on September 18, 1849. They had five children: Ann Eliza Rutherford (1851–1910), Friend Smith Rutherford (1853–1913), Mary Rutherford (1856–1937), Grace Rutherford (1857– ), and Letitia V Lillie Rutherford (1860–1938).

Rutherford studied law in Troy, New York. He moved to Edwardsville, Illinois, and then to Alton, Illinois, after 1857, where he practiced law.

== American Civil War ==
On June 30, 1862, Rutherford joined the Union Army and was appointed captain commissary of subsistence. On September 2, 1862, he resigned as captain commissary and helped organize the 97th Illinois Infantry Regiment, which was raised at Camp Butler, Illinois in August and September 1862. On September 16, 1862, Rutherford was commissioned as colonel of the 97th Illinois Infantry Regiment.

After some preliminary duty in central Kentucky in October and November, the 97th Illinois Infantry Regiment moved to Memphis, Tennessee and had duty there, November 20, 1862 – December 20, 1862. The regiment then was assigned to the 2nd Brigade, commanded by Colonel William J. Landram, of the 1st Division, commanded by Brigadier General Andrew Jackson Smith, of Major General William T. Sherman's Union Army XIII Corps.

In December 1862, Sherman led his corps in an expedition from the north along the Mississippi River to attack the Confederate States Army's base at Vicksburg, Mississippi, one of the two remaining major Confederate defensive positions along the last stretch of the Mississippi River controlled by the Confederacy. Overall Union commander, Major General Ulysses S. Grant planned a further assault in the direction of Vicksburg with his force luring the Confederates from their defenses toward the southeast while Sherman attacked them from the north. Union Navy gunboats and troop transports commanded by Rear Admiral David Dixon Porter also were part of the attack force. At the Battle of Chickasaw Bayou, over the period December 26–29, 1862, Sherman's force, which included the 97th Illinois Infantry Regiment led by Rutherford, was repulsed with heavy casualties and Grant abandoned this attempt to capture Vicksburg.

In January 1863, Sherman and his corps were temporarily assigned to the command of Major General John A. McClernand. Without Grant's knowledge, McClernand proceeded on an expedition up the Arkansas River, concluding with the Battle of Arkansas Post (or Fort Hindman) on January 9–11, 1863. Colonel William J. Landram's 2nd Brigade, including the 97th Illinois Infantry Regiment under Rutherford, supported Brigadier General Andrew Jackson Smith's 1st Brigade in their costly but successful assault on the center of the Confederate defenses.

After the Battle of Arkansas Post, Grant regained command of Sherman's force, the reorganized XV Corps, and also of McClernand, who kept command of the XIII Corps. Colonel Rutherford and his 97th Illinois Infantry Regiment, was still with Colonel Landram's brigade, now the 2nd Brigade in Brigadier General Andrew Jackson Smith's 10th Division. The 97th Illinois Infantry Regiment took part in the Battle of Port Gibson on May 1, 1863. After taking some bluffs without resistance, the Union force was slowed by a Confederate flanking assault. Reinforced by Brigadier General John A. Logan's division of Major General James B. McPherson's corps, the Union Army division of Brigadier General Peter Osterhaus of McClernand's corps attacked the Confederate right blank and made the position held by Confederate Brigadier General Martin Green untenable. Confederate commander Major General John Bowen withdrew his outnumbered force from Port Gibson that night.

At the Battle of Champion's Hill on May 16, 1863, the crucial battle of the Vicksburg campaign, Rutherford "had the not very pleasant duty of holding his regiment as a target for the Confederate artillery for at least two hours, and at a distance of not over 800 yards." Nonetheless, the regiment, which was on the left flank (south) of the Union force again suffered only light casualties. As the battle ended, the Confederate force retreated toward Vicksburg and prepared to defend a line at the Black River.

On the next morning, May 17, 1863, McClernand led his corps to the Black River where they fought in the Battle of Big Black River Bridge. After wading through water up to chest deep, other units of McClernand's corps surprised the Confederates at close range, forcing many of them into a disordered retreat into Vicksburg and capturing a reported 1,751 Confederate soldiers.

On May 19, 1863, and May 22, 1863, Rutherford led his regiment in two charges at the Vicksburg defenses at the start of the Siege of Vicksburg. The Union forces suffered significant casualties so Grant decided to besiege the city and proceed by maneuver instead of making further frontal attacks. The 97th Illinois Infantry Regiment then took part in the siege, culminating with the Confederate surrender on July 4, 1863.

Although the eight-volume 1908 compilation The Union Army by various editors states in the biographical sketch of Rutherford in volume 7, p. 220 that: "He then took part in the contest at Jackson, and under his leadership his regiment distinguished itself sufficiently to be praised by Maj.-Gen. W. T. Sherman, commanding the expeditionary army", in volume 6, pp. 517–518, in the sketch of the Battle of Jackson, the statement only refers to praise for the regiment. Rutherford could not have taken part in the Jackson Expedition with the 97th Illinois Infantry Regiment because he took sick leave due to "camp dysentary" and returned to Alton, Illinois to recover on July 5, 1863. Historians Stewart Sifakis and Roger D. Hunt confirm that Rutherford was not with the regiment at Jackson.

Rutherford did not get his leave properly extended, was declared absent without leave, and was dismissed from the service on October 16, 1863. He appealed to President Lincoln who revoked the dismissal on November 11, 1863, and reinstated Rutherford in command of the 97th Illinois Infantry Regiment. Rutherford returned to the regiment after it had been ordered to New Orleans, Louisiana, following the Second Bayou Teche campaign. At New Orleans, the regiment was on provost duty until May, 1864. Then the regiment moved to Morganza, Louisiana, for duty until September, 1864. While the regiment was at Morganza, on June 15, 1864, Rutherford resigned his commission due to continued ill health.

== Death and posthumous appointment ==
Rutherford had never regained full health after the Vicksburg campaign and resigned his commission on June 15, 1864, due to physical disability brought on by exposure and fatigue, also identified as "chronic diarrhea." He returned to Alton, Illinois, where he died five days later, on June 20, 1864. He was buried at Alton Cemetery. The military section of the cemetery, with some bodies transferred from elsewhere in the cemetery, became Alton National Cemetery in 1940.

On June 18, 1864, President Abraham Lincoln nominated Rutherford for appointment to the grade of brigadier general of volunteers and the United States Senate confirmed the appointment on June 28, 1864. Rutherford's appointment was dated June 27, 1864, and it was to rank from June 28, 1864. His appointment was made and his commission was issued without knowledge of his death on June 20, 1864.

== See also ==
- List of American Civil War generals (Union)
