= Lloyd's Steamboat Directory =

1856 American disaster chronicle

Lloyd's Steamboat Directory, and Disasters on the Western Waters
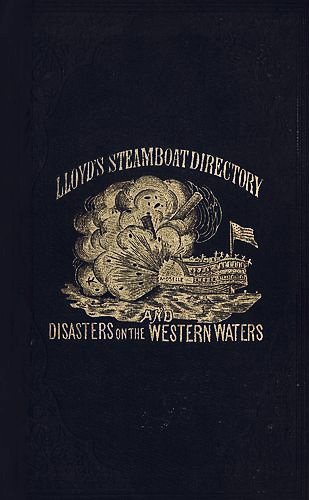
- Lloyd's Steamboat Directory cover featuring an illustration of the explosion of the Moselle (digital.library.pitt.edu)
- Publisher: John T. Lloyd & Co.
- Publication date: 1856
- LC Class: F353 .L80

Lloyd's Steamboat Directory, and Disasters on the Western Waters is a book published in 1856 listing steamboat businesses in the United States, along with an illustrated catalog of American maritime disasters. It covers "mainly river material, with a substantial scattering of lake items."

== History ==
John T. Lloyd heavily advertised the book in 1855, promising "The STEAMBOAT DIRECTORY will contain a complete list and description of all the Steamboats now afloat in the Western and Southern waters. The length, model, speed, power and tonnage of each boat, where and by whom built, the name of the boat, with the trade she is in...The RIVER DIRECTORY will contain a list and description of all the steamboat disasters that have occurred on the Western and Southern waters, beautifully illustrated, with a list of all those who have perished by their burning, sinking and exploding, on the Western and Southern waters. The Directory will contain maps of the Ohio, Mississippi, Missouri, Illinois, Arkansas, White, Red, Ouachita, Yazoo and other rivers, with the towns and cities, laid down, with correct distances."

After receiving a copy, the Journal and Messenger, of Macon, Georgia, editorialized:

Horrible Sacrifice of Life on Western Waters in Forty-Four Years.—From Lloyd's forthcoming Steamboat Directory we learn that since the application of steam on the Western waters there have been thirty-nine thousand six hundred and seventy-two [39,672] lives lost by steamboat disasters, three hundred and eighty one [381] boats and cargoes lost, and seventy [70] boats seriously injured amounting in the aggregate to the enormous sum of sixty-seven millions of dollars [US$67,000,000 (equivalent to $2,315,089,286 in 2025)]. It is to be hoped that this forthcoming work will have the effect of arresting the attention of the Government to the importance of western interests so far as our great rivers and lakes are concerned.

Similarly, in 1858 the National Intelligencer newspaper used statistics from Lloyd's Steamboat Directory to support their argument for Congressional action to regulate the steamboat industry. In June 1856, Godey's Lady's Book published an article called "Girls Should Be Taught to Swim" that apparently referenced Lloyd's Steamboat Directory.

The unabridged title of the steamboat book varies. The unabridged title of the edition posted online by the Library of Congress is Lloyd's Steamboat Directory, and Disasters on the Western Waters, containing the History of the First Application of Steam as a Motive Power; the Lives of John Fitch and Robert Fulton, Likenesses & Engravings of Their First Steamboats, Early Scenes on the Western Waters, 1798–1812 — History of the Early Navigation on Western Waters — Engravings of the Boats. Full Accounts of all the Steamboat Disasters Since the First Application of Steam Down to Present Date, with Lists of the Killed and Wounded — A Complete List of Steamboats and All Other Vessels Now Afloat on Western Rivers and Lakes — When and Where Built, and Their Tonnage; Maps of the Mississippi and Ohio Rivers, Towns, Cities, Landings, Population and Distances Correctly Laid Down on the Ohio, Mississippi, Missouri, Tennessee, Cumberland, Kentucky, Green, Illinois, Arkansas, White, Red and Yazoo Rivers. History of All the Railroads in the United States. Daguerrean Views and Sketches of Pittsburgh, Wheeling, Cincinnati, Louisville, Falls of Ohio, Nashville, Cairo, Falls of St. Anthony, Gate of the Rocky Mountains, St. Louis, New Orleans, and Mobile — Sketches of the Ohio and Mississippi Rivers, and Their Tributaries, Sources, Length, Area of Country Drained, &c. Names of All the U.S. Licensed Pilots and Engineers — Fast Time of Boats; The Earthquake in 1812, &c., &c., One Hundred Fine Engravings, and Sixty Maps; Being a Valuable Statistical Work, as well as a Guide-Book for the Travelling Public. The title page of the edition in the Internet Archive promises all of this but only "forty-six maps" (not 60), and also claims a "List of All the Plantations on the Mississippi River."

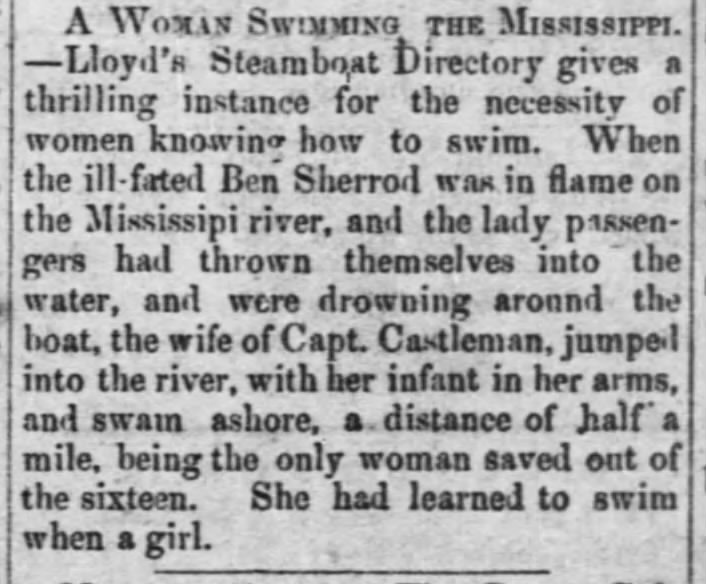
"A Woman Swimming the Mississippi" refers to the Steamboat Directory account of the Ben Sherod disaster (White Cloud Kansas Chief, June 11, 1857)

J. T. Lloyd also published Lloyd's American Railroad Weekly and early maps of the America Civil War. He was a "prolific" publisher during the war, selling material both original and appropriated. In 1861 he advertised that both Millard Fillmore and the library of the U.S. Department of State had ordered copies of his maps. In 1863 his advertisements included a letter from U.S. Secretary of the Navy Gideon Welles authoring purchase of Lloyd's map of Mississippi for the Mississippi Squadron under Rear Admiral Charles H. Davis.

== Influence ==
Lloyd's Steamboat Directory remains an object of fascination for its "morbid litany of ships snagged, exploded, burned, and sunk". In 1918 it was described as "an interesting but in many particulars an unreliable book". A 21st-century scholar concurs, writing that Lloyd's Steamboat Directory "gives more room for doubt than it does for study, dwelling as it does on the horrific and lurid catastrophes before 1856". Despite its flaws, the text and illustrations of Lloyd's Steamboat Directory have often been used as a reference when studying the steamboats of antebellum America.

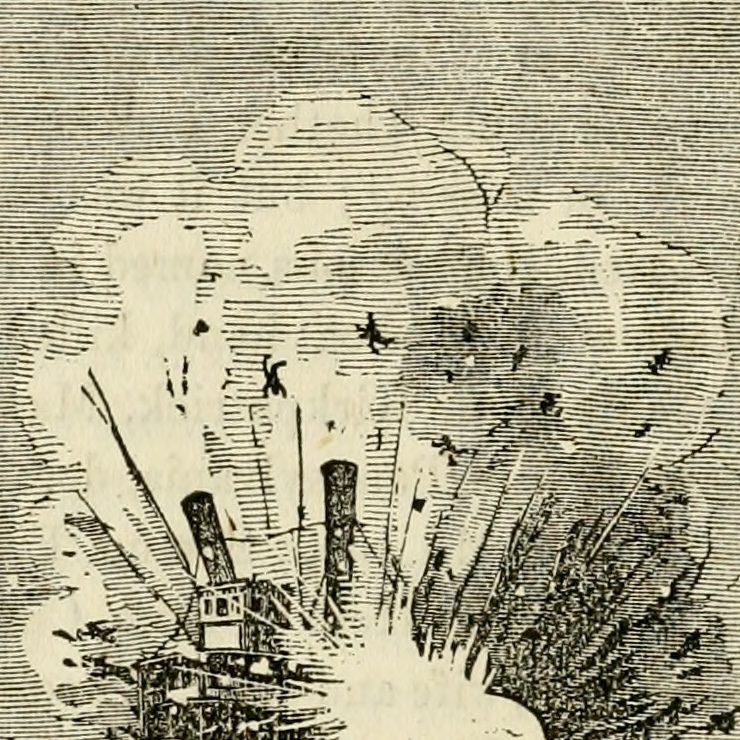
Detail of "Explosion of the A. N. Johnston" from Lloyd's Steamboat Directory, depicting what historian Rebecca Onion describes as a "repetitive motif" in the illustrations, of bodies being propelled into the air by boiler explosions

The "disasters on the western waters" portion of the book is illustrated with woodcut etchings that "reveal a repetitive motif when looked at in a larger format: bodies thrown in the air, depicted in flight at the moment of explosion." The illustrations of boiler explosions and snag-wrecked steamboats in Lloyd's Steamboat Directory should be presumed to be fanciful representations. For example, the illustration of the New Orleans is considered "obsolete" and at odds with the historical record: "A contemporary description of the vessel exists and does not agree in any particular with this illustration. According to the contemporary description, the New Orleans was not a stern wheeler and had no deckhouse." A review of "the Mississippi River as artistic subject" found some merit in the Steamboat Directory illustrations as artwork in that they were "an example of the crude but vivid illustration of the river...The glory of the book, however, is the series of cuts picturing explosions, sinkings, capsizings and burnings of steamships. Explosions are most satisfactory and complete; but undoubtedly the lugubrious tone of all of them rightly interprets the horror of disaster."

Fugitive-slave narratives and Lloyd's Steamboat Directory were "some of [19th-century America's] most graphically violent literature." Historian Walter Johnson describes the table of contents of Lloyd's Steamboat Directory as a "nightmare poem of alphabetized Americana: America, explosion of; America South, burning of; Anglo Norman, explosion of; Atlantic and Ogdensburg, collision of..."

== Additional images ==
Lloyd's Steamboat Directory (1856)
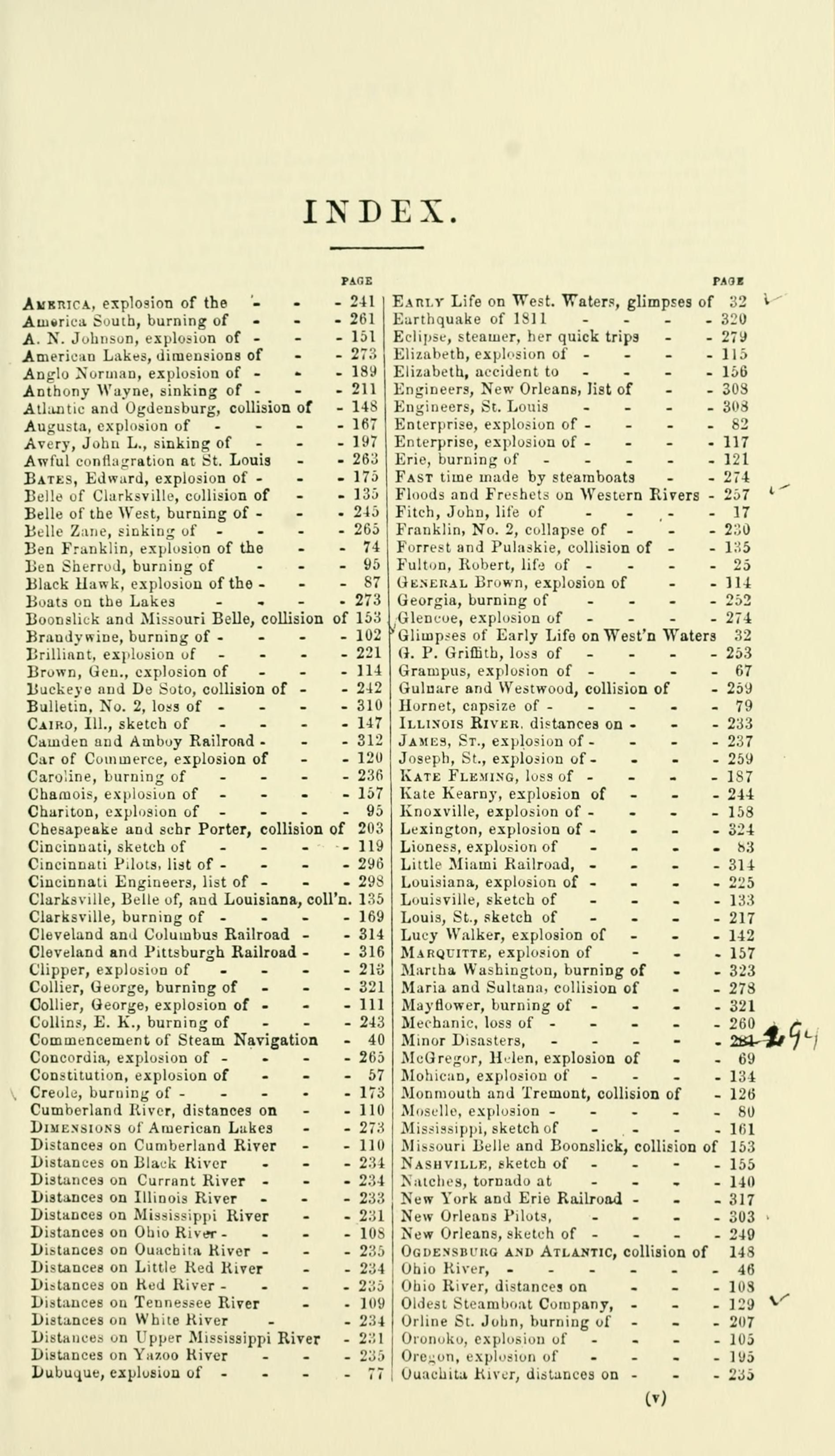
Index (page 1 of 2) to Lloyd's steamboat directory, and disasters on the western waters

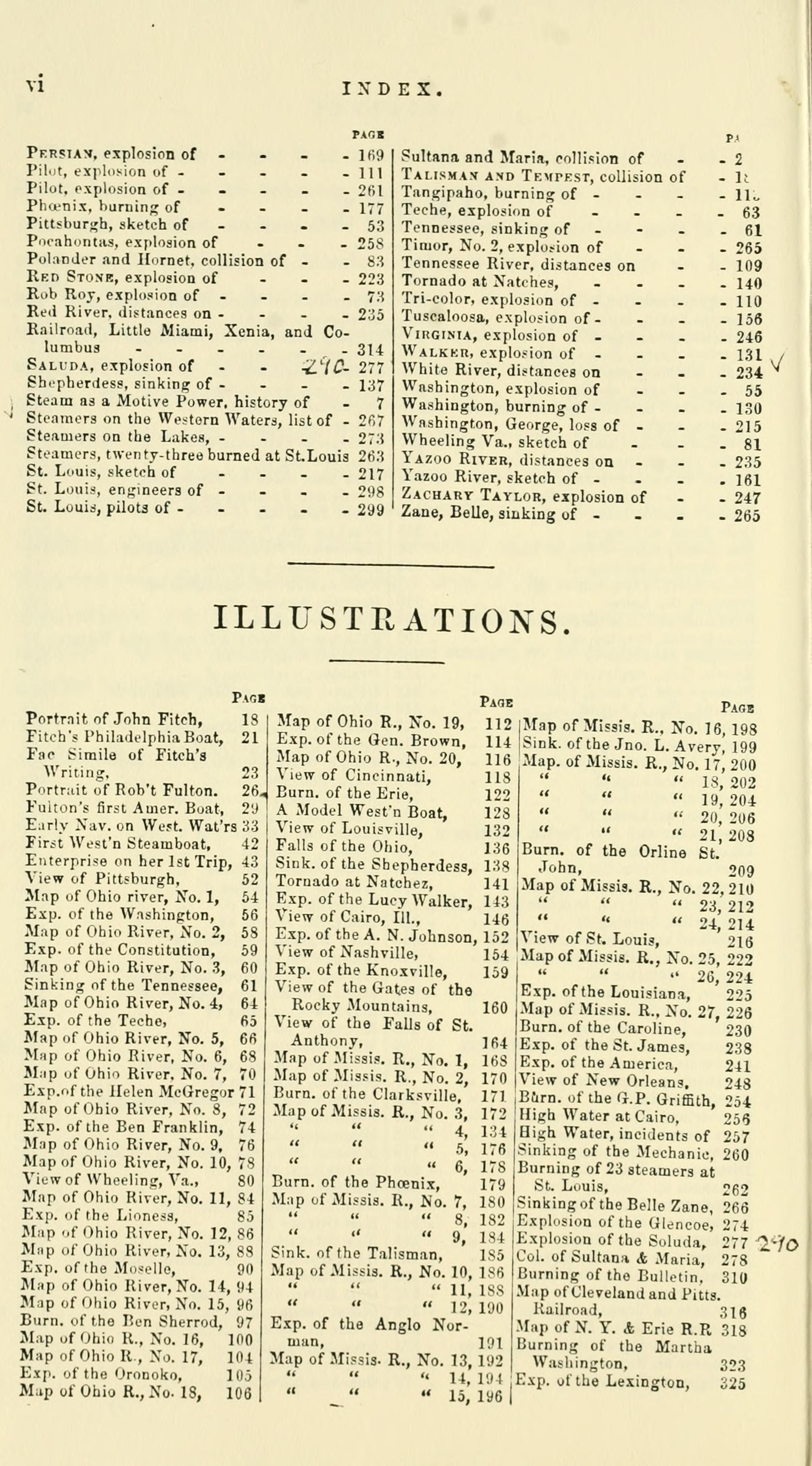
Index (page 2 of 2), and list of illustrations in Lloyd's steamboat directory, and disasters on the western waters

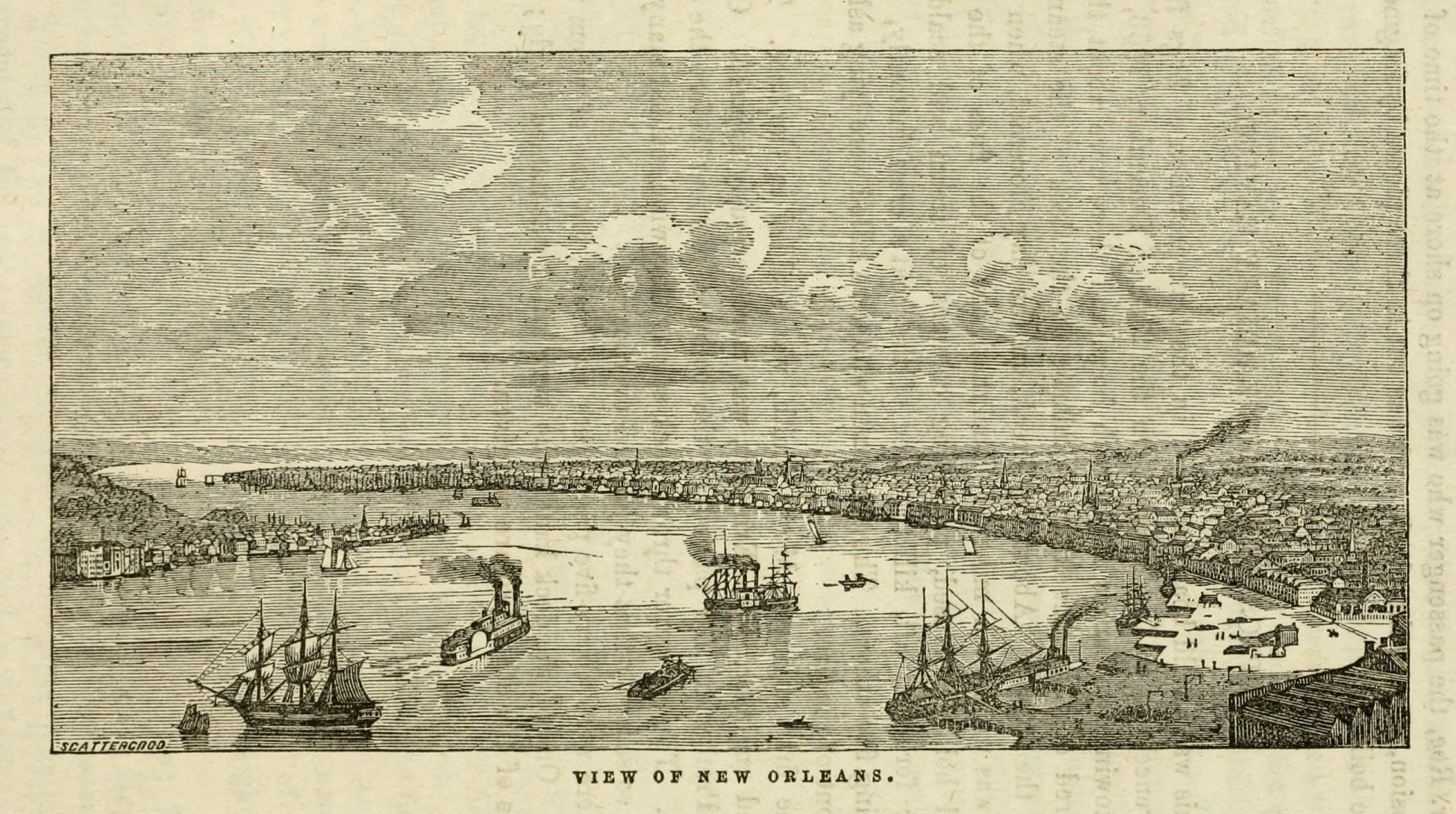
View of the port of New Orleans in the 1850s, etching signed Scattergood

== See also ==
- Steamboat Inspection Service
- Steamboats of the Mississippi
- List of boiler explosions
- List of disasters in the United States by death toll
- John Fitch – 18th-century American inventor and entrepreneur
- História trágico-marítima
- Norman's chart of the lower Mississippi River
