= Alexander Donelson Coffee =

American planter and Confederate officer (1821–1901)

- Alexander Donelson Coffee, undated photograph
- Born: June 3, 1821; Near Florence, Alabama, U.S.
- Died: May 9, 1901 (aged 79); Near Florence, Alabama, U.S.
- Burial place: Coffee family cemetery, Lauderdale County, Alabama
- Spouse(s): Ann Eliza Sloss (m. 1844; died 1871); Camilla Madding Jones (m. 1876)
- Children: 2
- Relatives: John Coffee (father); Andrew Jackson Coffee (brother)
- Military career
- Allegiance: Confederate States of America
- Branch: Confederate States Army
- Service years: 1861–1862
- Rank: Captain
- Units: Company C, 16th Alabama Infantry Regiment
- Conflicts: American Civil War; Battle of Shiloh; Battle of the Cumberland Gap (1862)
- Other work: Cotton manufacturer and planter

Alexander Donelson Coffee (June 3, 1821 – May 9, 1901) was an American cotton manufacturer, planter and Confederate States Army officer from Florence, Alabama. He was a partner in Martin, Weakley and Company, which operated the Globe cotton mills on Cypress Creek, and served as the first captain of Company C of the 16th Alabama Infantry Regiment.

== Early life ==
Coffee was born at Hickory Hill, near Florence, to General John Coffee and Mary Donelson Coffee. His father was a military officer, surveyor and one of the founders of Florence. His mother was a niece of Rachel Jackson, the wife of President Andrew Jackson. Coffee attended the Lorance School in Florence and entered the University of Nashville in 1837. He returned to Alabama in 1840 to manage the family estates.

== Manufacturing and plantation ==
Coffee became a partner of James Martin and Samuel D. Weakley in Martin, Weakley and Company, which operated cotton mills on Cypress Creek. Martin had established the Globe Factory with an earlier partner in 1839. After a fire destroyed it in 1844, Martin rebuilt the factory with Weakley. Coffee subsequently joined the business, although published accounts differ on when he became a partner.

The firm manufactured cotton cloth and expanded its operations before the Civil War. According to a National Register of Historic Places historical survey, it produced approximately 80,000 yards of cloth per week in 1850 using 46 looms and 1,600 spindles. By 1860, the complex included three cotton mills, a gristmill and a sawmill; the survey recorded 166 male and 139 female mill workers. Martin was the firm's principal partner.

Coffee also owned enslaved people, including a man named Henry and a woman named Emily and her daughter. In a June 1849 letter, Coffee's brother Andrew Jackson Coffee discussed a possible sale of Henry and proposed buying Emily and her daughter from him.

== Civil War and later years ==
Coffee was the first captain of Company C of the 16th Alabama Infantry Regiment, a unit raised in Lauderdale County. He served under Brigadier General Felix Zollicoffer at Cumberland Gap in 1861 and took part in the Battle of Shiloh in April 1862. Following Shiloh, he developed severe bronchitis and was sent first to a hospital at Corinth and then to one at Columbus, Mississippi. He resigned from the army several weeks later because of his health.

Union troops burned the Globe Factory complex in 1863. Coffee returned to farming at Ardoyne, his property near Florence, where he grew cotton and other crops and used improved agricultural machinery. The 1921 Dictionary of Alabama Biography also credits him with building, at his own expense, a turnpike from Florence toward his home on Cypress Creek.

== Family and legacy ==
Coffee married Ann Eliza Sloss in 1844. Their daughter Mary married Edward A. O'Neal Jr., a son of Alabama governor Edward A. O'Neal. After Ann's death in 1871, Coffee married Camilla Madding Jones in 1876. Their daughter Eliza died in 1904, aged 25.

Coffee died at Ardoyne on May 9, 1901, and was buried in the Coffee family cemetery near Florence. Ardoyne was destroyed by fire in 1919.

Camilla Coffee donated land to the city of Florence for a school built in 1916–1917. Coffee High School, named for Alexander and Camilla Coffee, opened there in 1917. She later contributed to the establishment of a Florence hospital on the condition that it be named for their daughter. The Eliza Coffee Memorial Hospital opened in 1919.
