= Ben Sherod =

Fire and explosion on Mississippi River, 1837

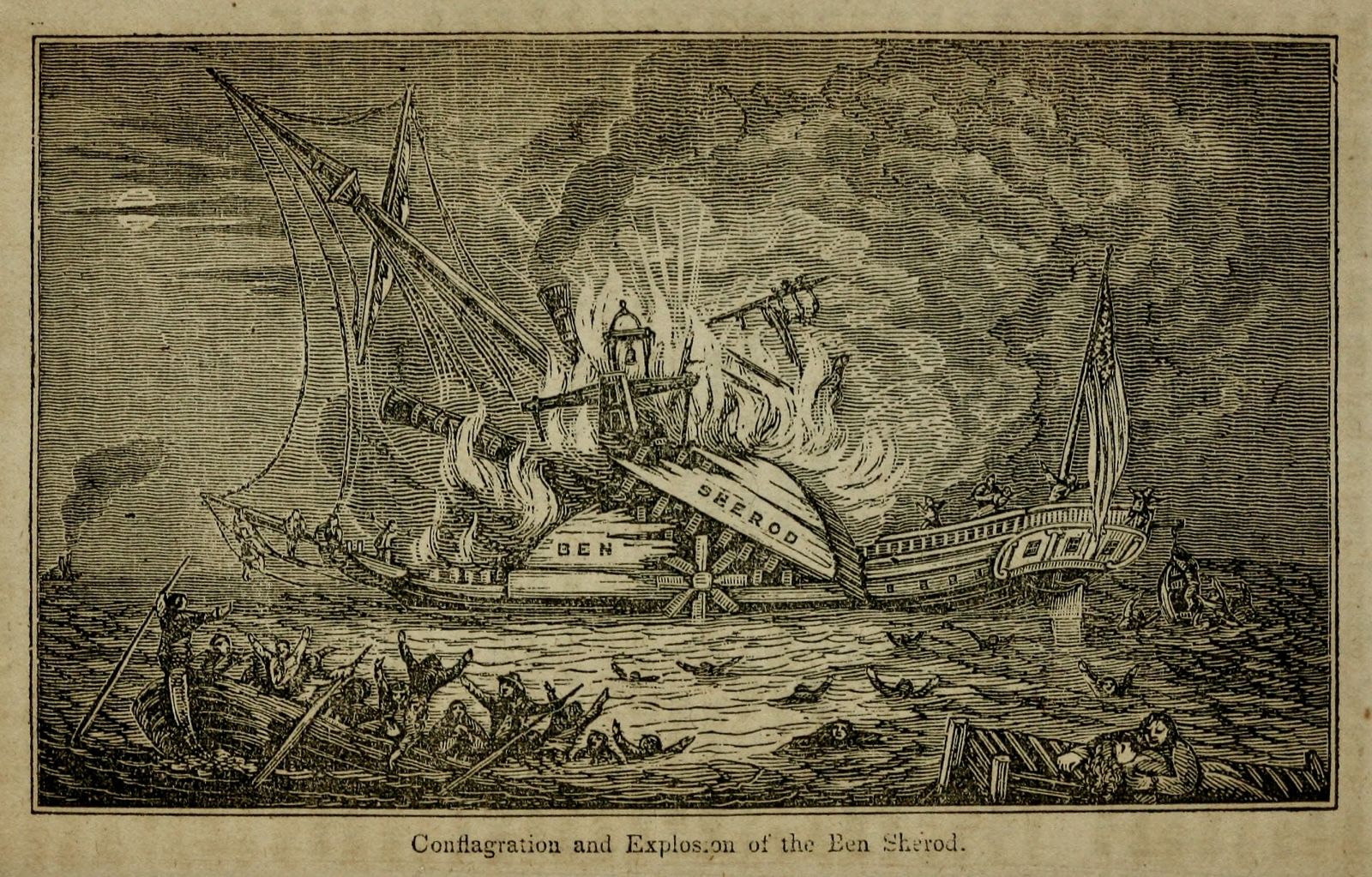
Inaccurate illustration of "conflagration and explosion of the Ben Sherod," published in Steamboat disasters and railroad accidents in the United States (1846)

The Ben Sherod (properly Ben Sherrod) was an American steamboat that was constructed in 1835. The boat was likely named for or owned at least in part by Alabama planter-baron Benjamin Sherrod, one of the largest slaveholders in the state. In February 1837 there was an accident at the Vicksburg, Mississippi steamboat landing where seven to 10 men were killed by being thrown into the water during a transfer by yawl. The Natchez Courier condemned this maneuver, writing, "we would remark, that the practice of sending passengers ashore while the boat is under way is a dangerous and reprehensible one. It was formerly customary on the Hudson River, but it having occasioned the loss of many lives, it has been laid aside for some years." The Vicksburg Weekly Sentinel reported that Captain Castleman was "running a race with the Fulton which was just ahead of him, and hence he would not spare the time necessary to lash his boat." The Vicksburg Whig discounted rumors that a steamboat race was involved. Castleman was arrested, tried, acquitted, and released, in short order. Several passengers wrote an open letter to the North Alabamian newspaper of Tuscumbia defending Castleman's captaincy of the boat.

Three months later, again under Captain George C. Castleman, the boat caught fire and then exploded on May 8, 1837, about 30 mi (48 km) south of Natchez, Mississippi. An estimated 175 people died of roughly 225 aboard. She had been steaming from New Orleans to Louisville. The steamer was reportedly "racing the Prairie upstream, and as she was losing, the stokers added resin to get a hotter fire under the boilers. Cordwood stacked on the deck caught fire; the pilot burned to death at his wheel while trying to beach the Sherrod." The Ben Sherrod caught fire just north of Fort Adams, Mississippi; the fire then spread and triggered explosions of barrels of whiskey and brandy, and 39 barrels of gunpowder in the cargo hold. The captain and most of his family survived. The burning, explosion, and sinking of the Ben Sherrod became one of the most infamous mass-casualty disasters of the 19th century United States, in part because it was re-reported in compilations like Lloyd's Steamboat Directory, and Disasters on the Western Waters. According to a history of transportation in Arkansas, "The fire, originating at one o'clock in the morning in a small pile of wood in front of the furnace, spread so rapidly that the captain did not have time to bring his boat to the shore. And when the passengers, clad only in their night attire, rushed to the decks, they found that the life boats were already burned. Some jumped into the water, hoping to find a piece of wreckage to support them; others clung to the sides of the burning ship. One woman, her clothing burned entirely off, frantically jumped with her child into the water and was drowned. Of the thirty-five Negroes on board, only two escaped. And the only two white women who survived saved themselves by clinging to hen coops which their husbands threw into the water." Another report puts blame on the crew maintaining the boilers, who "had a barrel of whisky before them, from which they drank often and freely until they were beastly drunk."

The wreck of the Ben Sherrod was located in 1994. The river had long since moved away from the site of the sinking, so excavations took place in a farm field in Wilkinson County, Mississippi.

== See also ==
- Lloyd's Steamboat Directory, and Disasters on the Western Waters
