= 1894 Alabama gubernatorial election =

- August 6, 1894
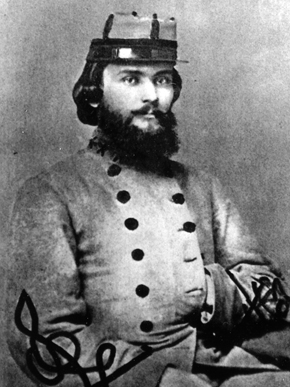

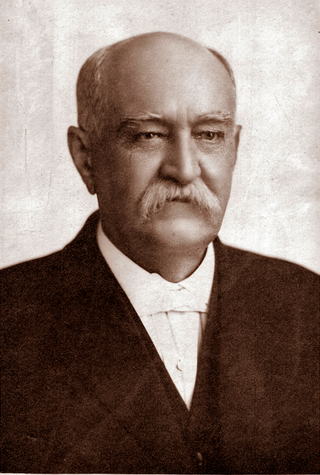
Nominee	William C. Oates	Reuben Kolb
Party	Democratic	Populist
Popular vote	110,875	83,292
Percentage	57.10%	42.90%
- County results Oates: 50–60% 60–70% 70–80% 80–90% >90% Kolb: 50–60% 60–70% 70–80%
Governor before election
Thomas G. Jones
Democratic
Elected Governor
William C. Oates
Democratic

The 1894 Alabama gubernatorial election took place on August 6, 1894, in order to elect the governor of Alabama.

Like the 1892 Alabama gubernatorial election, it was tainted by electoral fraud against Kolb.

== Results ==
1894 Alabama gubernatorial election
Party	Candidate	Votes	%
Democratic	William C. Oates	110,875	57.10
Populist	Reuben Kolb	83,292	42.90
Other	Write-ins	3	< 0.01
Total votes		194,170	100.00
Democratic hold			
