= 1896 Alabama gubernatorial election =

- August 3, 1896
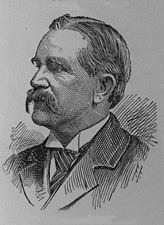

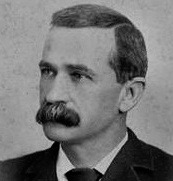
Nominee	Joseph F. Johnston	Albert Taylor Goodwyn
Party	Democratic	Populist
Popular vote	128,549	89,290
Percentage	59.01%	40.99%
- County results Johnston: 50–60% 60–70% 70–80% 80–90% >90% Goodwyn: 50–60% 60–70% 70–80%
Governor before election
William C. Oates
Democratic
Elected Governor
Joseph F. Johnston
Democratic

The 1896 Alabama gubernatorial election took place on August 3, 1896, in order to elect the governor of Alabama. Incumbent Democrat William C. Oates decided not to run for a second term in office.

== Results ==
1896 Alabama gubernatorial election
Party	Candidate	Votes	%
Democratic	Joseph F. Johnston	128,549	59.01
Populist	Albert Taylor Goodwyn	89,290	40.99
Other	Write-ins	4	>0.01
Total votes		217,843	100.00
Democratic hold			
