= Willis Brewer =

American politician (1844–1912)

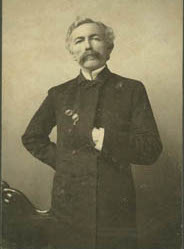

Member of the U.S. House of Representatives from Alabama's 5th district
- In office March 4, 1897 – March 3, 1901
- Preceded by: Albert T. Goodwyn
- Succeeded by: Charles W. Thompson

Member of the Alabama Senate
- In office 1882-1890, 1894-1897

Member of the Alabama House of Representatives
- In office 1880-1882, 1890-1894

Personal details
- Born: Willis Brewer; March 15, 1844 Sumter County, Alabama, U.S.
- Died: October 30, 1912 (aged 68) Montgomery, Alabama, U.S.
- Party: Democratic

Willis Brewer (1844–1912) was a United States representative from Alabama, holding office from 1897 to 1901. Before that, he held multiple terms of office in both the Alabama State Senate and the Alabama House of Representatives. He also held other public offices including State Auditor of Alabama and treasurer of Lowndes County, Alabama. He was trained as an attorney and practiced law in the state, was a newspaper editor in both Alabama and Florida, and wrote books about the history of Alabama.

== Early life and education ==
Brewer was born on March 15, 1844, near the town of Livingston in Sumter County, Alabama, to Robert Willis and Jane (Hadden) Brewer. He attended the common schools and, at the age of fourteen, entered a local printing business. At seventeen, he and a schoolmate, William R. DeLoach, who later became Judge of the probate court in Sumter County, established a newspaper in Milton, Florida.

== Military career ==
During the latter part of the U.S. Civil War, while still engaged in the newspaper business in Florida, Brewer entered the Confederate States Army. Because of health issues, he was unable to serve in the fighting, but served post duty and during the latter part of the war was a staffmember for Brigadier General Wirt Adams.

After the war, Brewer studied law and was admitted to the bar in 1870. He then began a practice in Hayneville, Alabama.

== Public service ==
Brewer was appointed Treasurer of Lowndes County, Alabama, in 1871 by Governor Robert B. Lindsay. He was elected as State Auditor of Alabama, where he served from 1876 to 1880. He served as member of the Alabama House of Representatives from 1880 to 1882 and again from 1890 to 1894. He served in the Alabama State Senate from 1882 to 1890 and again from 1894 to 1897.

Brewer was elected as a Democrat to the Fifty-fifth and Fifty-sixth Congress (March 4, 1897, to March 3, 1901). In April 1898, Brewer was among the six representatives who voted against declaring war on Spain. After an unsuccessful bid for renomination in 1900, he resumed the practice of law and continued his work as an author.

Brewer died in Montgomery, Alabama, on October 30, 1912, and was interred in the family mausoleum on Cedars Plantation near Montgomery.

U.S. House of Representatives
Preceded by Albert T. Goodwyn	Member of the U.S. House of Representatives from Alabama's 5th congressional district 1897-1901	Succeeded by Charles W. Thompson
