= James E. Cobb =

American politician (1835–1903)

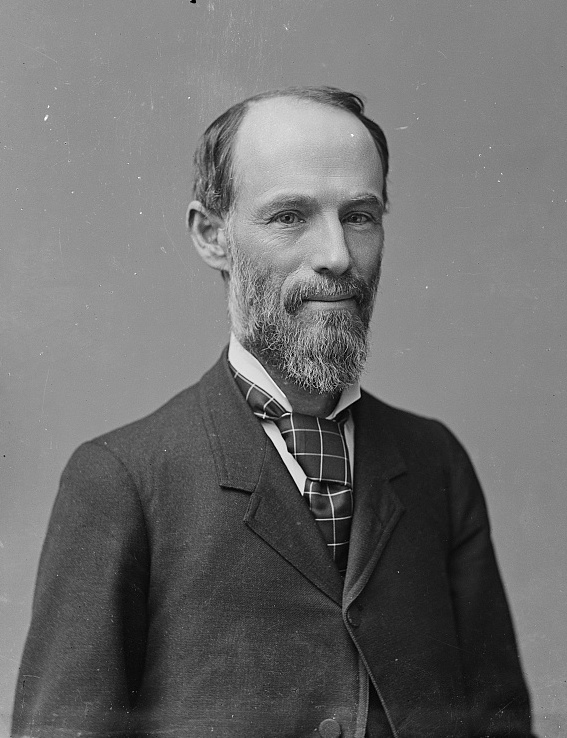

Member of the U.S. House of Representatives from Alabama's 5th district
- In office March 4, 1887 – April 21, 1896
- Preceded by: Thomas W. Sadler
- Succeeded by: Albert T. Goodwyn

Personal details
- Born: James Edward Cobb; October 5, 1835 Thomaston, Georgia
- Died: June 2, 1903 (aged 67) East Las Vegas, New Mexico
- Party: Democratic

James Edward Cobb (October 5, 1835 – June 2, 1903) was a U.S. Representative from Alabama.

Born in Thomaston, Georgia, Cobb attended the public schools and graduated from Emory College in Oxford, Georgia in June 1856, where he studied law. He was admitted to the bar and practiced law. He moved to Texas in 1857. He entered the Confederate States Army in 1861 as lieutenant in Company F, Fifth Texas Regiment, and served in the Army of Northern Virginia until he was taken prisoner at the Battle of Gettysburg in July 1863. After his release, he settled in Tuskegee, Alabama, and practiced law until 1874. He served as Circuit judge from 1874 to 1886. He was reelected as a judge in 1886, but before qualifying he was elected to Congress as a Democrat to the Fiftieth and to the three succeeding Congresses (March 4, 1887 – March 3, 1895). He presented credentials as a Democratic Member-elect to the Fifty-fourth Congress and served from March 4, 1895, to April 21, 1896, but his rival for office challenged the election results. In a rare political reversal, his rival in the election, Albert T. Goodwyn, proved the election was stolen and Congress seated Goodwyn in April 1896. Cobb resumed the practice of law in Tuskegee, Alabama. He served as delegate to the State constitutional convention in 1901. He died in East Las Vegas, San Miguel County, N.Mex., June 2, 1903 and was interred in Evergreen Cemetery, Tuskegee, Alabama.

U.S. House of Representatives
Preceded by Thomas W. Sadler	Member of the U.S. House of Representatives from Alabama's 5th congressional district 1887-1896	Succeeded by Albert T. Goodwyn
