= Thomas Williams (Alabama politician) =

American politician (1825–1903)

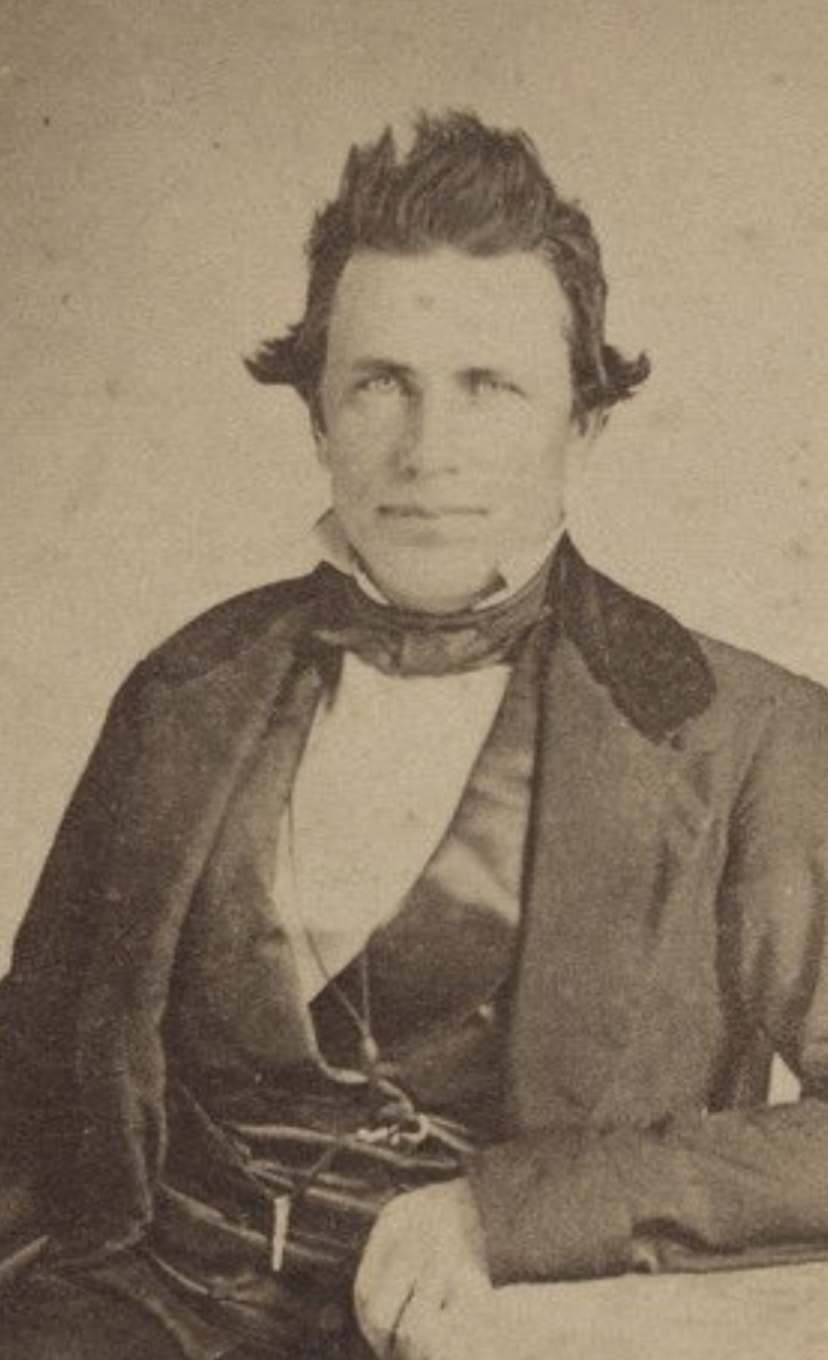

Member of the U.S. House of Representatives from Alabama's 5th district
- In office March 4, 1879 – March 3, 1885
- Preceded by: Robert F. Ligon
- Succeeded by: Thomas William Sadler

Member of the Alabama House of Representatives
- In office 1860
- In office 1878

Personal details
- Born: August 11, 1825 Greensville County, Virginia, US
- Died: April 13, 1903 (aged 77) Wetumpka, Alabama, US
- Party: Democratic
- Occupation: Politician, lawyer, farmer

Thomas Williams (August 11, 1825 – April 13, 1903) was an American politician, lawyer, and farmer. A Democrat, he was a member of the United States House of Representatives from Alabama.

== Biography ==
Williams was born on August 11, 1825, in Greensville County, Virginia, the son of the Rev. John D. Williams. At age 14, they moved to Kowaliga, Alabama, where Williams worked as a farmhand. They later moved to Wetumpka. Educated at preparatory schools, he would complete a degree at the University of East Tennessee.

Williams read law from books borrowed from a Seth P. Storrs, and in 1852, was admitted to the bar. He would live in Texas for a few years before returning to Wetumpka, where he began practicing law. He retired from law in 1872, then pursue agriculture.

Williams was a Democrat. At times, he served as justice of the peace and as a register in a court of equity. In 1872, he was appointed state prison inspector. He was a member of the Alabama House of Representatives (1878), though The Political Graveyard claims 1860. He was a member of the United States House of Representatives. He served in the House from March 4, 1879, to March 3, 1885, representing Alabama's 5th district. Politically, he supported penal labor and the leasing of convicts to the private sector.

After serving in Congress, Williams returned to farming in Wetumpka. He was married, had four sons and was a member of the Methodist Episcopal Church. On March 31, 1903, he suffered a paralyzing stroke that would result in his death on April 13, aged 77, in Wetumpka. He was interred at Wetumpka Cemetery.

U.S. House of Representatives
Preceded by Robert F. Ligon	Member of the U.S. House of Representatives from Alabama's 5th congressional district 1879-1885	Succeeded by Thomas William Sadler
