= Henry W. Hilliard =

Confederate Army general

Henry Washington Hilliard
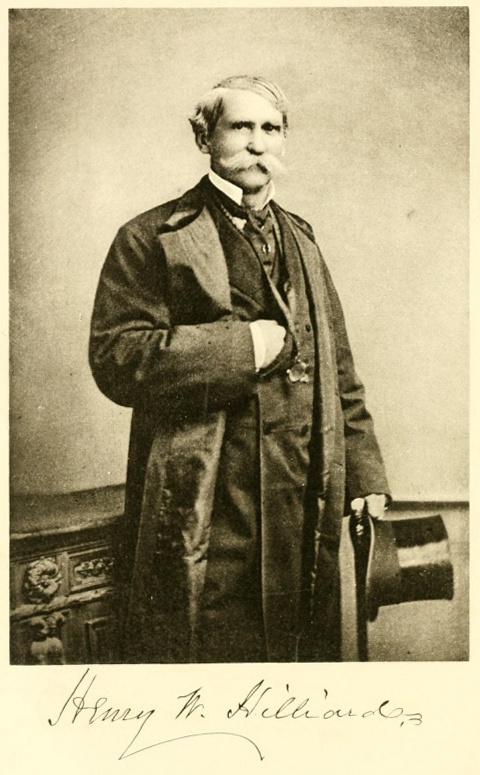
- Circa 1892

United States Ambassador to Brazil
- In office October 23, 1877 – June 15, 1881
- President: Rutherford B. Hayes
- Preceded by: James R. Partridge
- Succeeded by: Thomas A. Osborn

Member of the U.S. House of Representatives from Alabama's 2nd district
- In office March 4, 1845 – March 4, 1851
- Preceded by: James E. Belser
- Succeeded by: James Abercrombie

Member of the Alabama House of Representatives
- In office 1836–1838

Personal details
- Born: August 4, 1808 Fayetteville, North Carolina
- Died: December 17, 1892 (aged 84) Atlanta, Georgia
- Resting place: Oakwood Cemetery (Montgomery, Alabama)
- Party: Whig

Military service
- Allegiance: Confederate States of America
- Branch/service: Confederate States Army
- Years of service: 1861–1862
- Rank: Colonel (CSA)
- Commands: Hilliard's Alabama Legion
- Battles/wars: American Civil War

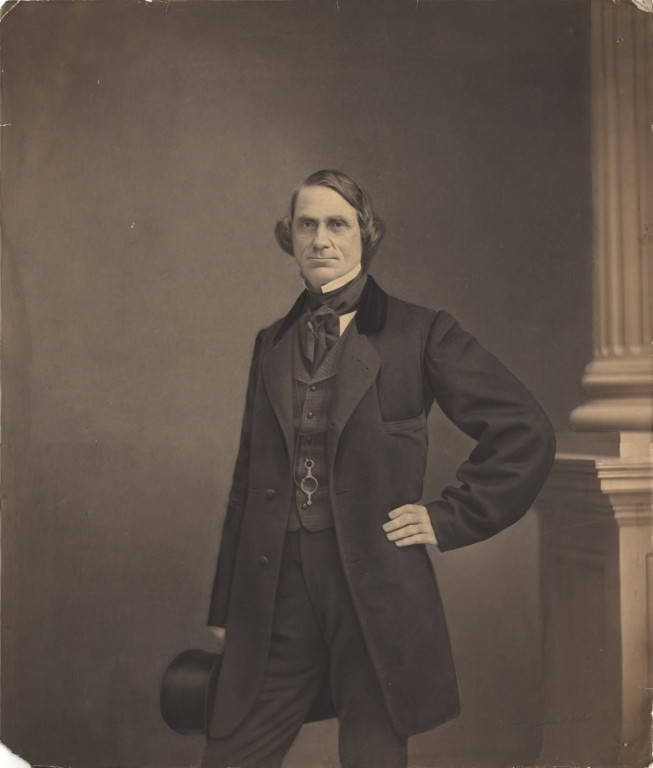
Portrait of Henry Washington Hilliard, by Mathew Brady, c1851

Henry Washington Hilliard (August 4, 1808 – December 17, 1892) was a U.S. representative from Alabama and a colonel in the Confederate States Army during the American Civil War. In later life, he became a proponent of abolitionism in Brazil.

== Early life ==
Hilliard was born in Fayetteville, North Carolina, and graduated from South Carolina College (now the University of South Carolina) at Columbia in 1826. While at South Carolina College, he was active in the Euphradian Society. He read law under William C. Preston and then moved to Athens, Georgia, where he was admitted to the bar in 1829. He was a Professor of English Literature at the University of Alabama from 1831 to 1834, when he resigned to practice law in Montgomery, Alabama.

He served as a member of the state house of representatives from 1836–1838, was a delegate to the 1839 Whig National Convention at Harrisburg, Pennsylvania, ran as a Whig presidential elector in 1840, and was an unsuccessful candidate for election to the 27th United States Congress. He was chargé d'affaires to Belgium from May 12, 1842, to August 12, 1844.

Hilliard was elected as a Whig to the 29th, Thirtieth, and 31st Congresses, serving from March 4, 1845 to March 3, 1851. He was not a candidate for renomination in 1850. Following the end of his term, he joined the short-lived Union Party which supported the Compromise of 1850.

In 1856, he served as presidential elector on the American ticket.

== Civil War service ==
In 1861 he was appointed by Jefferson Davis Confederate commissioner to Tennessee. During the Civil War, he served as a colonel in the Confederate States Army.

Hilliard's Legion was organized at Montgomery, Alabama in June, 1862, and consisted of five battalions; one of these, a mounted battalion, was early detached and became part of the Tenth Confederate cavalry. The Legion proceeded to Montgomery nearly 3,000 strong, under the command of Col. H. W. Hilliard, and was placed in McCown's Brigade. It took part in the siege of Cumberland Gap, and spent the fall and winter in Kentucky and east Tennessee.

Hilliard resigned from the army December 1, 1862 to take care of personal affairs and because he had not been promoted to brigadier general.

== Postbellum ==
He moved to Augusta, Georgia, in 1865 and resumed the practice of his profession.

He was an unsuccessful Republican candidate for election in 1876 to the 45th Congress.

He resumed the practice of law in Augusta, Georgia, moving later to Atlanta.

He was Envoy Extraordinary and Minister Plenipotentiary to Brazil from July 31, 1877, to June 15, 1881. In Brazil he worked with Joaquim Nabuco and Emperor Pedro II to support abolition.

He died in Atlanta, Georgia, December 17, 1892 and was interred in Oakwood Cemetery, Montgomery, Alabama.

== Honors ==
In 2022, Hilliard was inducted into the Alabama Lawyers Hall of Fame.

== Notes ==
U.S. House of Representatives
Preceded by James Edwin Belser	Member of the U.S. House of Representatives from Alabama's 2nd congressional district March 4, 1845 – March 3, 1851	Succeeded by James Abercrombie
Diplomatic posts
Preceded by James R. Partridge	United States Minister to Brazil; October 23, 1877 – June 15, 1881	Succeeded by Thomas A. Osborn
