= John William Jones (Alabama state senator) =

American politician

John William Jones (d. January 29, 1909) was an American politician and civil servant from Alabama.

Just after the American Civil War he was active as a businessman in Hayneville, Alabama, where he ran a plantation, a race track, and a store. In the city of Montgomery, the area of High Street and Jackson Street, he bought up large swaths of land in the mid-1880s, and built a large building named "Centennial Hall" there. He was a state senator for Lowndes County, Alabama, and had been a delegate to the Republican National Convention four times. After he retired from politics he was a district revenue collector for Mobile and Montgomery. At his death, he was praised by the Colored Alabamian. Jones was buried in Oakwood Cemetery.
