= Albert T. Goodwyn =

American politician

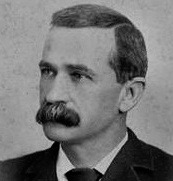

Member of the U.S. House of Representatives from Alabama's 5th district
- In office April 22, 1896 – March 3, 1897
- Preceded by: James E. Cobb
- Succeeded by: Willis Brewer

Member of the Alabama House of Representatives
- In office 1886; 1887

Member of the Alabama Senate
- In office 1892-1896

Personal details
- Born: Albert Taylor Goodwyn; December 17, 1842 Robinson Springs, Alabama, US
- Died: July 1, 1931 (aged 88) Birmingham, Alabama, US
- Resting place: Oakwood Cemetery
- Party: Democratic
- Relations: Robert Tyler (father-in-law) John Tyler (grandfather-in-law)
- Education: University of South Carolina

Military service
- Allegiance: Confederate States of America
- Branch/service: Confederate States Army
- Rank: Captain
- Unit: 58th Alabama Infantry
- Battles/wars: American Civil War

Albert Taylor Goodwyn (December 17, 1842 – July 1, 1931) was a U.S. representative from Alabama.

== Early life and military career ==
Born at Robinson Springs, Alabama, Goodwyn attended Robinson Springs Academy and South Carolina College at Columbia (now the University of South Carolina). During the Civil War, he enlisted in the Confederate Army and served until June 1865. He was mustered out at the close of the war as captain of a company of sharpshooters and was decorated with the Southern Cross of Honor. He graduated from the University of Virginia at Charlottesville, where he was a member of St. Anthony Hall, in 1867. He engaged in agricultural pursuits near Robinson Springs.

== Political career ==
Goodwyn served as state inspector of convicts 1874–1880. He served as member of the Alabama House of Representatives in 1886 and 1887. He served in the Alabama Senate 1892–1896. In 1894, Goodwyn as a Populist challenged incumbent Democrat James E. Cobb for the Congressional seat from Alabama's 5th district. At first, Cobb was declared re-elected 10,651 to 9,903, but Goodwyn successfully contested the election of James E. Cobb to the Fifty-fourth Congress and obtained the seat, holding it from April 22, 1896 until March 3, 1897. He was an unsuccessful candidate for reelection as the nominee of the Populist and Republican parties in 1896 to the Fifty-fifth Congress, losing to Silver Democrat Willis Brewer, 8,742 (39.2%) to 13,587 (60.2%). In 1896, Goodwyn also ran as the Populist nominee for governor of Alabama, but was defeated by Joseph F. Johnston 89,290 (41%) to 128,540, although the official returns may indicate fraud.

Goodwyn was elected commander in chief of the United Confederate Veterans on May 8, 1928. He resumed agricultural pursuits near Robinson Springs, Alabama. He died while on a visit in Birmingham, Alabama, on July 1, 1931. He was buried in Oakwood Cemetery, Montgomery, Alabama.

Party political offices
Preceded by Reuben Kolb	Populist nominee for Governor of Alabama; 1896	Succeeded by Gilbert B. Dean
U.S. House of Representatives
Preceded by James E. Cobb	Member of the U.S. House of Representatives from Alabama's 5th congressional district 1896-1897	Succeeded by Willis Brewer
