= Gwen Patton =

American civil rights activist and educator

Gwendolyn Marie Patton (October 14, 1943 – May 11, 2017) was a prominent civil rights activist and educator. Patton's first steps into the civil rights movement were with the Montgomery Improvement Association (MIA) where she helped African Americans register to vote with her grandparents. During this time, she also participated in the Montgomery bus boycott. After her time with the MIA, Patton could be seen working with the Student Nonviolent Coordinating Committee (SNCC) at Tuskegee University and the Lowndes County Freedom Organization. Following her time at Tuskegee University, she assisted in establishing both anti-war and human rights organizations that furthermore supported the feminist and Black Power movements, as well as communism, the Cuban Revolution, and marxism. In the 1984 presidential debates, she started her political career as a delegate for Jesse Jackson’s campaign. Then in 1986 as a candidate for Alabama legislature, and finally in 1992 in the U.S. Senate. Patton was also a historian, which helped her to construct the H. Councill Trenholm State Technical College, which is now called the Trenholm State Community College.

== Early life ==
Patton was born to Robert and Jeanetta (Bolden) Patton in Detroit, Michigan. Robert was a union representative that worked for the United Auto Workers Union, and Jeanetta was a Lewis Business College graduate. Both parents encouraged Gwen and her brother, Robert, Jr., to focus on school and to learn as much as they could. Their parents had taught them to have a purpose in life, and that part of the meaning of life was to “uplift the race.” After her mother had passed when she was 16, Patton moved to Montgomery to live with some relatives that she had visited occasionally in the past during the summers. While visiting in Montgomery, prior to the passing of her mother, Patton would often work with her father's parents in their home to help Black voters prepare for the literacy test when they were getting ready to vote. The literacy test would often be the prerequisite test that would be what denied Black people their right to vote, which prompted Patton's grandparents to turn their home into a “citizenship school” to combat this barrier. Through working with her relatives, Gwen found a deep passion for the civil rights movement, especially with voting rights.

== Education ==
=== Tuskegee University ===
Patton attended Tuskegee University, where she was described as an outstanding student, a cheerleader, and the first woman president of the Student Government Association (SGA). During the mid-1960's, she worked through the Tuskegee Institute Advancement League (TIAL) to help other Tuskegee students become an aligned, but separate section of the Black activism movement. Many of her classmates found Patton to be a capable and dynamic leader, and they would often join her at different segregation boycotts, or anti-war organizing. They also agreed with Patton's views on voting rights and partnered with SNCC, as well as created the Black Panther Party for Lowndes County.

=== Graduate education ===
Patton went on to further her education in 1972 by receiving a master's degree in history and education from the Antioch School of Law (now the University of the District of Columbia). After receiving her master's degree, she then went on to work towards a doctorate degree in political history and higher education administration from Union Graduate School (now Clarkson University) in New York.

== Political activism ==
=== Activism in college ===
In the 1960s, Patton was a founder of the Alabama Democratic Conference, the Black political section of the state's Democratic Party. She was also the founder of the National Black AntiWar, AntiDraft Union (NBAWADU), as well as the National Association of Black Students (1969), and the Alabama New South Coalition (1986). Patton's involvement began as an organizer for the Montgomery Bus Boycott, assisting with the collection of shoes, grocery shopping for black people in the neighborhood, and organizing efforts on the transportation committee to ensure the boycott's success. Patton was able to excel as an activist as a result of her experiences when she went to Tuskegee Institute for her undergraduate study in 1962. Patton's background and experience as a volunteer with Montgomery's boycott activities taught her the importance of analyzing and locating the Tuskegee campus's basis of student strength. Tuskegee's student body government served as the epicenter of student power and control. Patton and others, aligned with a militant group of students on campus, aimed to remove the student body government (SBG) out of the hands of Tuskegee's fraternities and social types. Patton immediately realized that if the revolutionary students acquired control of the SBG's funds, they could implement a strategy to "transform the SBG and to direct the programs which could build social consciousness". In 1965, Patton was elected student body president after a satisfactory conclusion for the militant student faction on campus through the democratic procedure. Patton was ecstatic to discover that the level of political awareness among Tuskegee students paralleled the changing national landscape for students committed to social change.

=== Work with the NSA ===
Patton attended USNSA conferences and regional gatherings as president of the SBG. By 1964, students from all around the country had joined the "Fast for Freedom" food boycott, which was a nationwide effort to link an anti-poverty initiative to the Civil Rights movement's momentum. Students from all over the country would forgo meals for an evening and contribute the proceeds to help poor Black people in the South and the broader civil rights movement (Michel 2004). Patton began visiting the NSA national headquarters, motivated to take a proactive position on the NSa's accountability procedures. Patton was met with an unexpected response from NSA officials when she began challenging the national organization's procedures and protocol. Along with Birmingham mayor Richard Arrington Jr., Selma lawyer J. L. Chestnut Jr., Selma politician Hank Sanders, University of Alabama at Birmingham faculty member Virginia Volker, who founded the Unitarian Universalist Church of Birmingham (the city's first church to open its doors to people of all races), and Greene County education activist and co-founder of the Greene County Democrat Carol Zippert, Patton helped found the Alabama New South Coalition. The group aims to increase voter registration, education, and leadership development in the community. Patton then founded the Southern Regional Africa Peace Coordinating Network in 1987 to raise awareness of anti-apartheid violence in South Africa among southerners.

== Career ==
=== After college ===
Patton became a prolific Black Power theorist shortly after college, producing papers like "Pro Black, Not Anti-White" about the subject and its beginnings. She was compensated by the Student Human Relations Project (SHARP) to speak on college campuses on Black Power thought and practice. Wille Ricks and Stokely Carmichael popularized the phrase, but theorists like Patton helped develop its outlines and uses for ordinary people.

=== As an educator ===
She spent her career as an English teacher, curriculum expert, and adjunct professor while also founding and leading two significant civil rights organizations: the National Black Anti-War, Anti-Draft Union (NBAWADU) and the National Association of Black Students (NABS). The first was the anti-war movement's first national organization dedicated to combating racism and sexism, while the latter was a group of students and activists dedicated to facilitating the "transition from student to student worker to worker consciousness." Before returning to Alabama in 1978, she taught at Antioch, as well as in New York and Vermont. She headed the Academic Advising Center at Alabama State University, where she also taught for a time, from 1981 to 1986, and coordinated Tuskegee Institute's Centennial Campaign, a fundraising campaign.

=== Later career ===
Patton was named archivist at Trenholm State Technical College in 1992 to preserve the Montgomery Pioneer Voting Rights Collection, which included Rufus A. Lewis and Idessa Williams, among other local activists. She also co-founded the Montgomery Friends of the Selma to Montgomery National Historic Trail in 1998, which resulted in the erection of historic markers and consistent litter removal along the newly established trail, as well as opposition to the development of nearby landfills in Lowndesboro in 2000. Hands on the Freedom Plow, a book about the thoughts of Black women leaders in SNCC, brought Patton national attention in 2010. In 2014, she left Trenholm State Technical College.

Gwen Patton died in Montgomery on May 11, 2017, and is buried at Oakwood Cemetery.

== Publications ==
- Patton, Gwendolyn (2020). My Race to Freedom: A Life in the Civil Rights Movement. NewSouth Books. ISBN 978-1-60306-451-4.
- Patton, Gwendolyn M. (1975). "Open Letter to Marxists". The Black Scholar. 6 (7): 50–52. doi:10.1080/00064246.1975.11413711. JSTOR 41066371.
- Patton, Gwendolyn (1970). "Black People and the Victorian Ethos". In Bambara, Toni Cade (ed.). The Black Woman: An Anthology. New American Library. pp. 143–148. ISBN 978-0-451-61868-9. OCLC 1028870923.
