= Oakwood Cemetery (Montgomery, Alabama) =

Historic cemetery in Alabama, United States

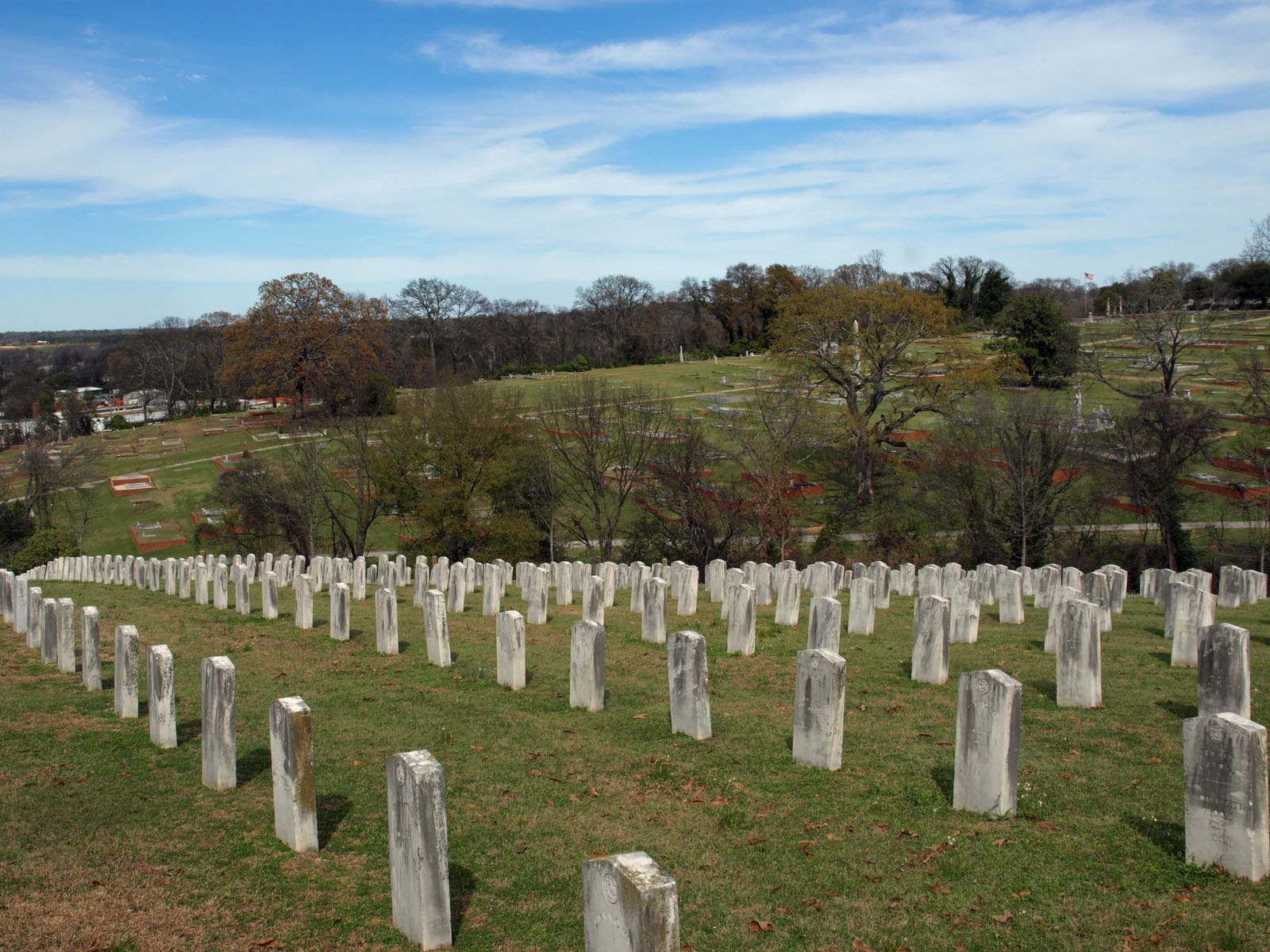
- Confederate graves at Oakwood
- Interactive map of Oakwood Cemetery

Details
- Established: 1819
- Location: 829 Columbus Street, Montgomery, Alabama 36104
- Country: United States
- Coordinates: 32°23′04″N 86°17′41″W
- Find a Grave: Oakwood Cemetery

Oakwood Cemetery is a historic cemetery in Montgomery, Alabama, United States. Strictly speaking, it is two cemeteries: Oakwood itself, which is owned by the city, and the next-door Oakwood Cemetery Annex, the location of the Hank Williams Memorial and the graves of four governors of Alabama. The annex was in private hands until its owner died in 2004 without directing to whom the property should pass; ownership of which thus passed to the state of Alabama, although it has been maintained by the city since 2009 and a proposal was put forward in 2013 to transfer ownership to the city.

Partly sandwiched in between the two is the St Margaret's Cemetery owned by the Roman Catholic Archdiocese of Mobile. Until 2017, the Archdiocese had been accidentally burying Catholics on city property since 1863, the deeds to St Margaret's having been drawn up in the 1850s and the error not having been spotted in the 1863, 1945, or 1981 extensions; only when the records were checked for a fourth extension was the error discovered and rectified.

In 2017 the Archdiocese swapped some of its land, on which the city had similarly placed an access road running on what had theretofore been thought to be city property in between the Archdiocesan and Annex cemeteries, for the city land that it had inadvertently been using. By redrawing the boundaries between the Archdiocesan and city property, St Margaret's was expanded to cover 7.512 acres (3.040 ha), returning existing gravesites to Catholic-owned land without the need for re-interment.

The cemeteries are accessed from Upper Wetumpka Road, with three entrances for Oakwood proper, St Margaret's, and the Annex in order along that road in the direction from the intersection of Ripley Street and Jefferson Street. They are close to Montgomery Police Station.

== Contents ==
The Oakwood cemetery, owned by the City of Montgomery, opened in 1819 and covers 120 acres (49 ha), and includes a plot for soldiers of the American Civil War. Some 800 Confederate soldiers are buried here, alongside 198 Union soldiers. Their graves are on a hill adjacent to the burial site of William Lowndes Yancey and his wife Sarah Yancey, who died in Athens, Georgia, 20 years after he did, and who was buried alongside him.

The cemetery land was donated to the city by two of its founders when two places were combined into one, John Scott who lived in the then East Alabama and Andrew Dexter who lived in the then New Philadelphia, and accrued further land as the years passed.

As of 2014 there were 200,000 burial sites in the cemetery. The oldest part is known as the old graveyard, and is a free burial site, where there were no racial segregation rules, and many slavers are buried alongside the people that they enslaved. John Scott originally donated the Scott's Free Burying Ground. There are two graves of enslaved people that are marked as such, one simply named "Jim", owned by the Sebussier family and whose grave is marked by a brick enclosure, and a Susan Tooley buried in November 1856 next to him, both at the top of the old cemetery's horseshoe-shaped area.

Many people are simply marked as "unknown". Some of these died in the 1918 influenza pandemic, when the death rate was so high that burials were rushed and records not accurately kept. Other "unknowns" include an infant who was found in Catoma Creek, a 13-year-old girl found in a railroad car in 1895, a death from strychnine poisoning, and someone found drowned near the wharf in 1883.

A forgotten pauper's cemetery was rediscovered in a vacant lot close to Oakwood Cemetery in 2009, and there is still a section of the cemetery for vagrants, the homeless, and the destitute. The pauper's cemetery is now the Children of God section of Oakwood Cemetery. Other named sections include the Land of Peace, where many Jewish people are buried.

A section of Oakwood near to the railroad contains graves that are anonymous for a different reason: they are the 47 graves of people who were executed by public hanging. Although the graves themselves have no names, the cemetery records have them, albeit that they are sealed from public knowledge.

Also buried in Oakwood Cemetery Annex are pilots from Britain, Canada, and France who died during World War II, while training at Maxwell Air Force Base. There are 78 RAF students buried in the cemetery, near to the Hank Williams Memorial, who died between June 1941 and February 1942. Their graves were originally marked by wooden crosses, but by October 1943 they had granite headstones. Although it had been intended that all cadets who died during training were to be buried here, before November 1941 when burials started here some of them had already been buried in other locations, in sites donated by local churches, veteran's organizations, and private citizens, and were reinterred here by February 1942. From 1981 onwards, care of the RAF section of the cemetery was maintained by a private Birmingham company under contract to the Canadian Agency of the Commonwealth War Graves Commission. RAF officers who are stationed at Maxwell hold a ceremony in the RAF section on Veterans Day.

The aforementioned memorial to Hank Williams is a twin set of 16-foot (4.9 m) monoliths, one for Hank and one for Audrey Williams, surrounded by artificial grass. In 1981 one of his biographers observed that it was pretty much the only memorial to Williams remaining in Montgomery, the Empire Theatre no longer celebrating him and his mother's old boarding houses having been redeveloped, and that the city's boosters do not have any signage directing tourists seeking Williams to the Annex. Country music journalist Martha Hume observed in 1982 that the Annex was not signposted and not even listed in the Montgomery telephone directory. In 1991, a statue of him across from Montgomery City Hall (on S. Perry Street) was unveiled, and there is a museum dedicated to him in downtown Montgomery.

Odd burial customs to be found in the cemetery include quartz bottles of water lining some graves, following an old superstition that it made water available to the dead in the afterlife, akin to grave goods.

== Racial segregation and historic funerals ==
Several funerals at the main cemetery and the Annex have had notable effects on the day-to-day business of Montgomery. At the funeral of William Calvin Oates one reporter observed that it seemed that "half the people of the city had gathered" in the cemetery. The 1884 funeral of James White Hardie, local businessman and representative for Talladega County in the Alabama state legislature, was marked by the city Chamber of Commerce agreeing to close all of their businesses so that they could all attend the funeral.

=== Funeral of Hank Williams ===
Hank Williams's funeral, recorded as the largest funeral in Montgomery's history and one of the largest in the entire Southern United States, had a line two and a half city blocks long between the Montgomery City Auditorium and the Oakwood Cemetery Annex, with three trucks required to handle the wreaths that were placed at the Annex, and (according to R. L. Lampley and Marvin Stanley, respectively the Fire and Assistant Police Chiefs in charge) 100 fire and police officers managing a crowd conservatively estimated at between 15,000 and 20,000 people. Thousands more visited the grave in the Annex in the days to follow, with an editorial in the Montgomery Advertiser remarking that "Never in the history of this town have so many thronged to the funeral of a citizen as they did in the case of Hank Williams. Bankers, jurists, physicians, writers, governors and philanthropists have been returned unto dust in Montgomery, but the coffin of none was followed as was that of the dead singer."

There were 200 African American mourners in the segregated seating in the Auditorium, the editor of the Advertiser Joe Azbell recounting that "They came from everywhere, dressed in their Sunday best, babies in their arms, hobbling on crutches and canes, Negroes, Jews, Catholics, Protestants, small children, and wrinkle faced old men and women." Another funeral whose mixed-racial attendance was remarked upon by a reporter for the Advertiser was that of Thomas Goode Jones, which was attended, the reporter noted, by hundreds of people that included large groups of African Americans watching as their "friend" was buried.

=== Funeral of Bob Goodwyn ===
The Advertiser also reported the cross-racial attendance of the funeral on March 28, 1909, of Bob Goodwyn, observing that "In his death, one-armed Bob Goodwyn, the negro ferryman, achieved a something as few of his race have done — for at his grave in Oakwood Cemetery yesterday, whites and blacks mingled with little distinction; the two people mingled their voices in the 'Nearer My God to Thee'; both bowed to tender, revertant homage to one whom they hailed as a hero." His pallbearers were eight white boys from Starke's School and hundreds of Montgomery locals attended.

Goodwyn, known as "Old Bob" or "One-Armed Bob" who lost his right arm in an industrial accident in a gin shop, had worked as a ferryman across the Alabama River, employed by W. A. Henderson of the Southern Railway. On April 11, 1908, he had rescued E. W. Bliss, a ticket purchase agent for the L&N, from drowning in the Alabama River with his 16-year-old friend from the Western Railway, H. Q. Daniels who was a machinist. In response to a suggestion from reader Mrs William Knox, the Advertiser organized a collection for Goodwyn, and on May 30, 1908, he was awarded a gold medal for heroism by Montgomery mayor W. M. Teague. On March 8, 1909, Goodwyn drowned in the same river along with four others, whilst crossing it in a batteau trying to reach Goodwyn's ferry that was parked on the opposite bank. The batteau catching on the ferry cable caused it to capsize, and Goodwyn drowned when he had to lose grip on the overturned boat in order to try to catch with his one arm a rope that was thrown to him by rescuers.

He was originally to have been buried in Lincoln Park Cemetery, but Bliss paid for a burial lot on Oakwood. There were no floral arrangements for the funeral, but many took to picking nearby flowers and dropping them on the grave. The actual location of his grave is unknown, not being recorded in the cemetery records, although it is known to be somewhere near to the front of the cemetery on its main drive. His gold medal, recorded as donated to the Alabama Department of Archives and History because his mother did not want it, has since been lost.

In a 2024 retrospective the Advertiser noted that its reporting included the word "negro", which was an automatic racial addition by the Advertiser at the time for any African Americans. It similarly observed how the remarks of Sheriff Horace Hood at the medal award ceremony were tuned to a white audience and pointedly othered Goodwyn, talking of how the medal would protect him when he wore it and how it assured "all people of your race that they have the good will of the white people when they perform their duties, and show good will to the dominant race, and this good will, as you know, Bob, is not to be despised".

Goodwyn's medal and funeral, according to Montgomery historian Richard Bailey was one of the "pockets of incidents that went against the status quo" in Alabama history.

=== Burial of Mary Ann Neeley ===
Another burial of particular note is that of Mary Ann Neeley, a historian who had given guided tours of the cemetery, and who when she died in 2018 was buried there. Aged 85 when she died, she had been for 25 years the executive director of the Landmarks Foundation, a non-profit organization devoted to teaching the history of the city. This included her walking tours not only of Oakwood but of other places around the city, lectures at Auburn University and Huntingdon College, and the publication of several local history books. She had also organized an annual symposium on historical topics for academics, writers, and others called the Cultural Crossroads.

== In popular culture ==
F. Scott Fitzgerald modeled the cemetery with graves of confederate soldiers that character Sally Carrol Happer walked through in his short story "The Ice Palace" on Oakwood.

Alan Jackson's 1992 hit song "Midnight in Montgomery" is about a night-time visit to Hank Williams's grave.

== Notable individual burials and monuments ==
- James E. Belser (1800–1854), enslaver and politician
- Nicholas H. Cobbs (1796-1861), first Episcopal bishop of Alabama
- James Chastain, "gentleman thief" shot dead by Adolphus Sanford Gerald (who was later to become police chief of Montgomery) disowned by his family and buried under cover of darkness in March 1881 to avoid scandal
- William Parish Chilton (1810–1871), politician and author
- James Holt Clanton (1827–1871), US and Confederate soldier, lawyer who is buried in the Scotts Free section of the cemetery
- David Clopton (1820–1892), politician
- Samuel Dale (1772–1841), frontiersman, soldier, politician (cenotaph)
- F. Scott Fitzgerald (1896–1940), novelist (cenotaph)
- Benjamin Fitzpatrick (1802–1869), Alabama governor and US Senator
- Birkett Davenport Fry (1822–1891), adventurer, lawyer, Confederate officer
- George Goldthwaite (1809–1879), Alabama Supreme Court justice and U.S. senator
- Albert Taylor Goodwyn (1842–1931), Confederate veteran, U.S. Representative
- Malcolm Daniel Graham (1827–1878), Confederate veteran and politician
- Hilary Abner Herbert (1834–1919), Secretary of the U.S. Navy, U.S. Representative
- Henry Washington Hilliard (1808–1892), U.S. Representative and Confederate general
- James Thadeus Holtzclaw (1833–1893), lawyer, railroad commissioner, and Confederate general
- William Robert Houghton (1842–1906), Confederate veteran, lawyer, and writer
- John William Jones (d. 1909), businessman and state senator
- Thomas Goode Jones (1844–1914), lawyer, politician, and Confederate officer
- Clifford Lanier (1844–1908), writer and businessman, brother of Sidney Lanier
- Robert Fulwood Ligon (1823–1901), lawyer and Lieutenant Governor
- Tennant Lomax, killed at the battle of Seven Pines
- William Ludecas, born with dwarfism but buried in a full-size suit and coffin because people hoped that this would mean that he would not suffer from it in the afterlife as he had in his actual life
- Wilson Nesbitt (1781–1861), U.S. representative
- William Calvin Oates (1835–1910), Confederate officer, Governor of Alabama, brigadier general in the U.S. Army during the Spanish–American War
- Gwen Patton (1943–2017), civil rights activist and educator
- John William Augustine Sanford Jr (1825–1913), Confederate officer, lawyer, Alabama Supreme Court clerk, and Attorney General of Alabama
- Anthony D. Sayre (1858–1931), father of Zelda Sayre Fitzgerald
- Henry Churchill Semple, the "Pelham of the West", an artillery man in the Civil War who led Semple's Battery
- George Washington Taylor (1849–1932), U.S. Representative
- Jack Thorington, mayor of Alabama
- John Russell Tyson (1856–1923), lawyer, politician and Alabama Supreme Court judge
- Ariosto Appling Wiley (1848–1908), lawyer and U.S. representative
- Hank Williams (1923–1953), singer-songwriter

== Gallery ==
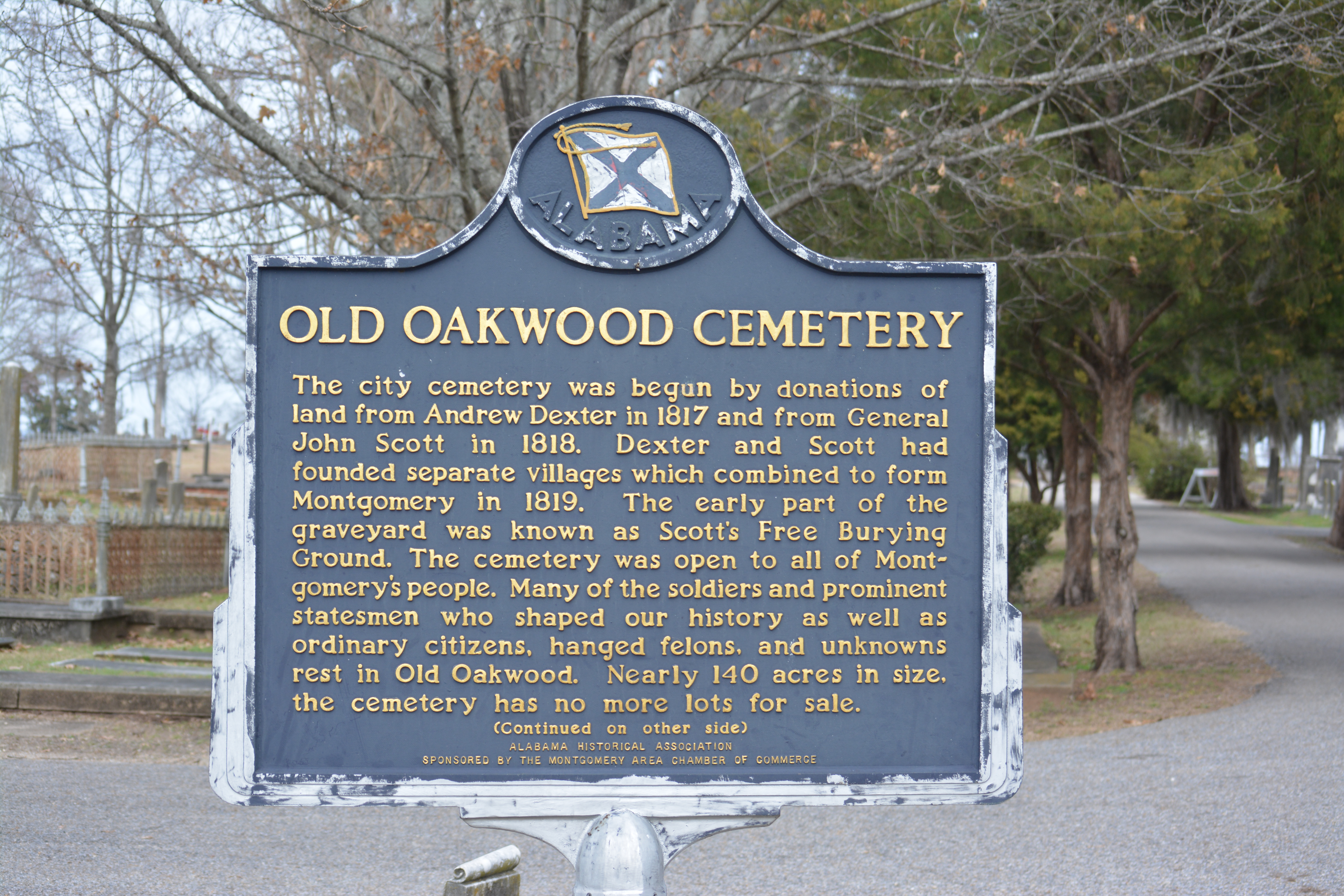

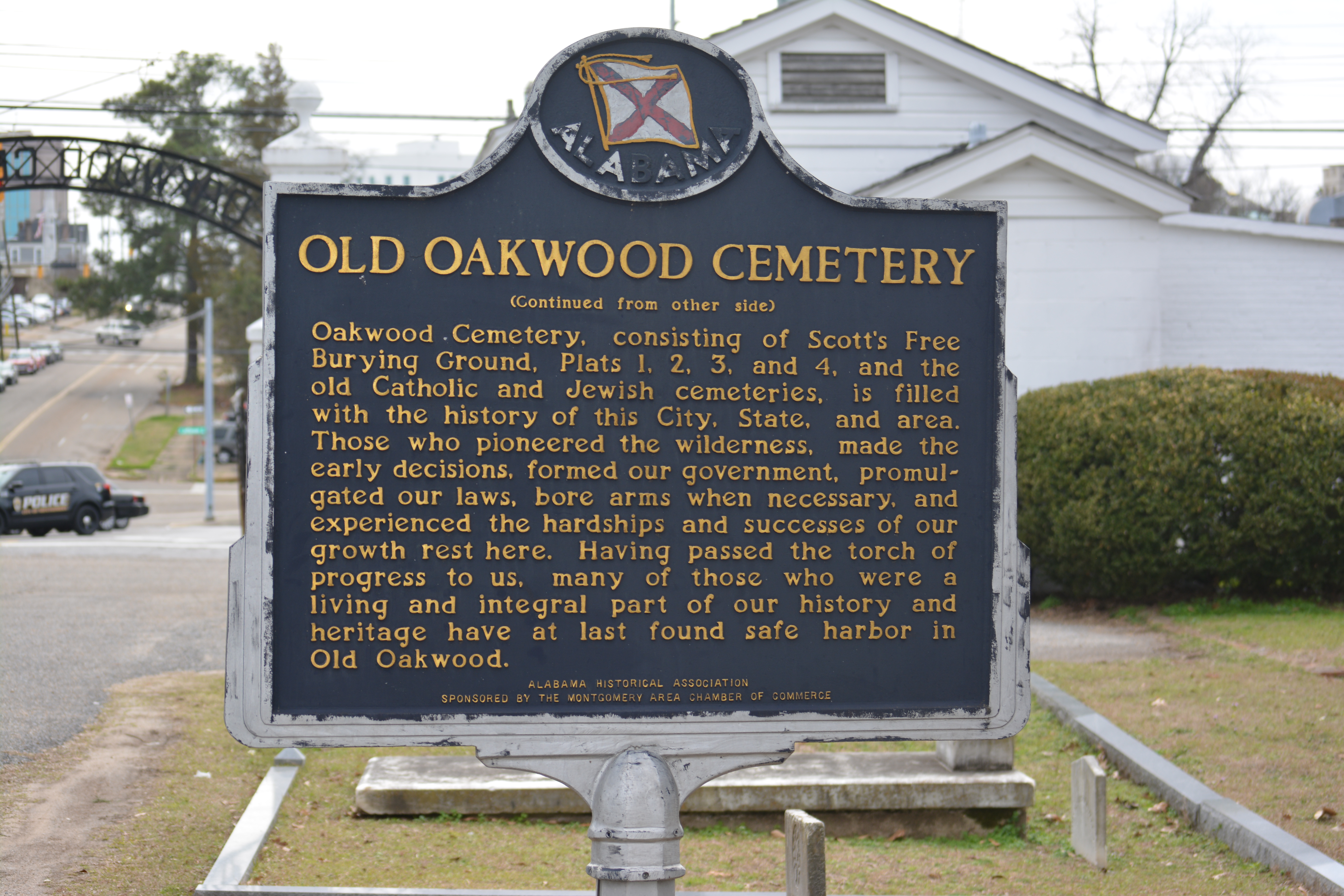

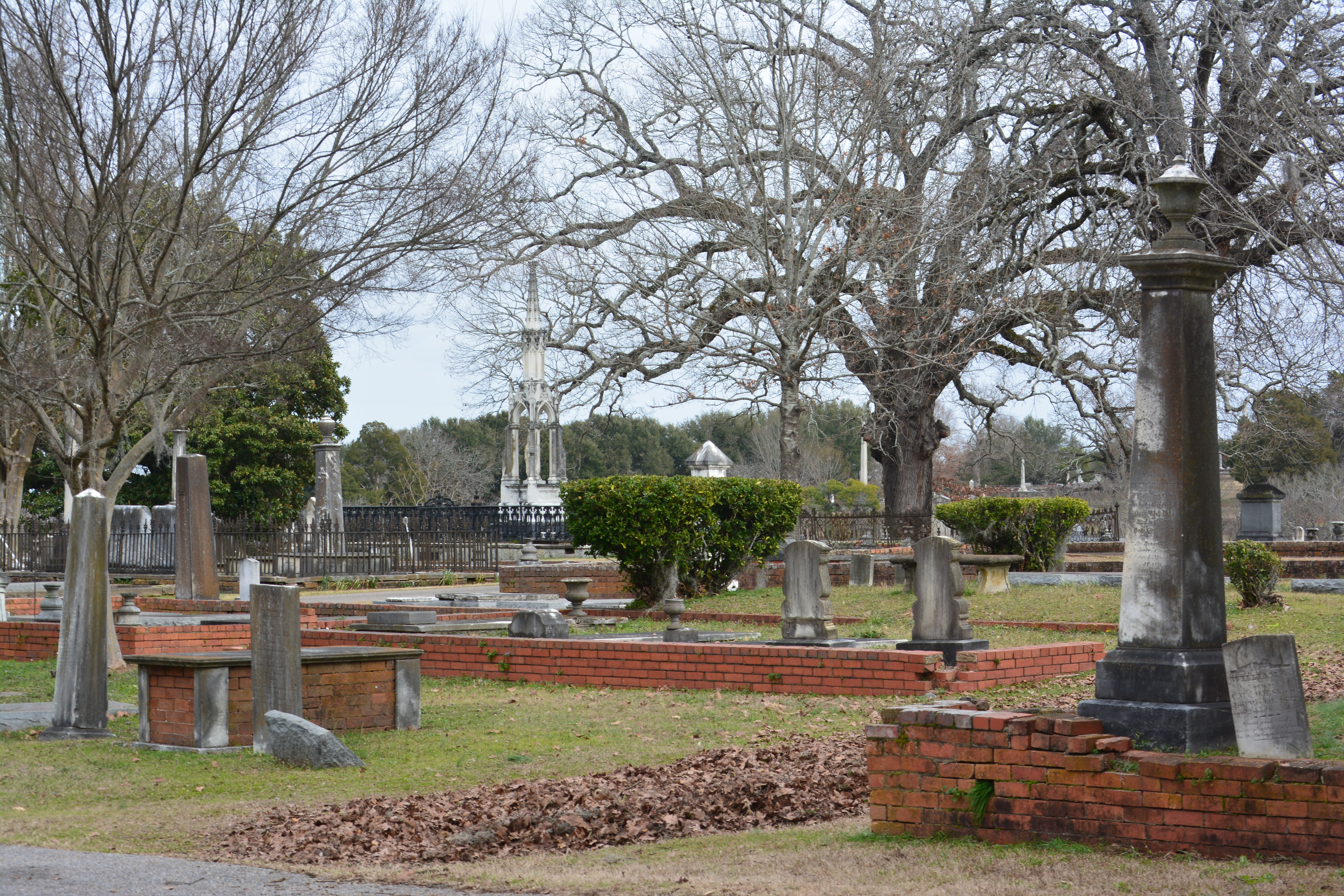

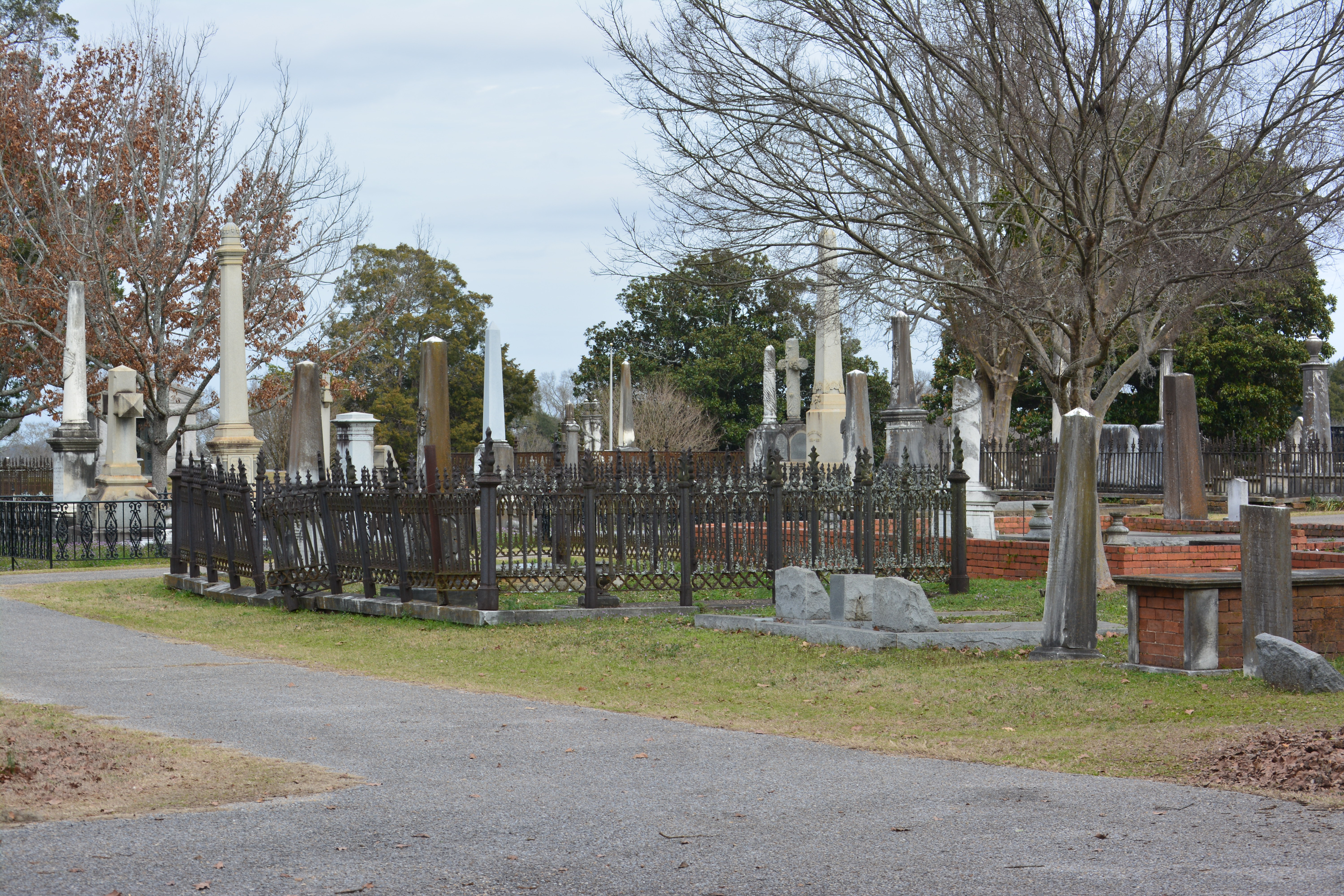

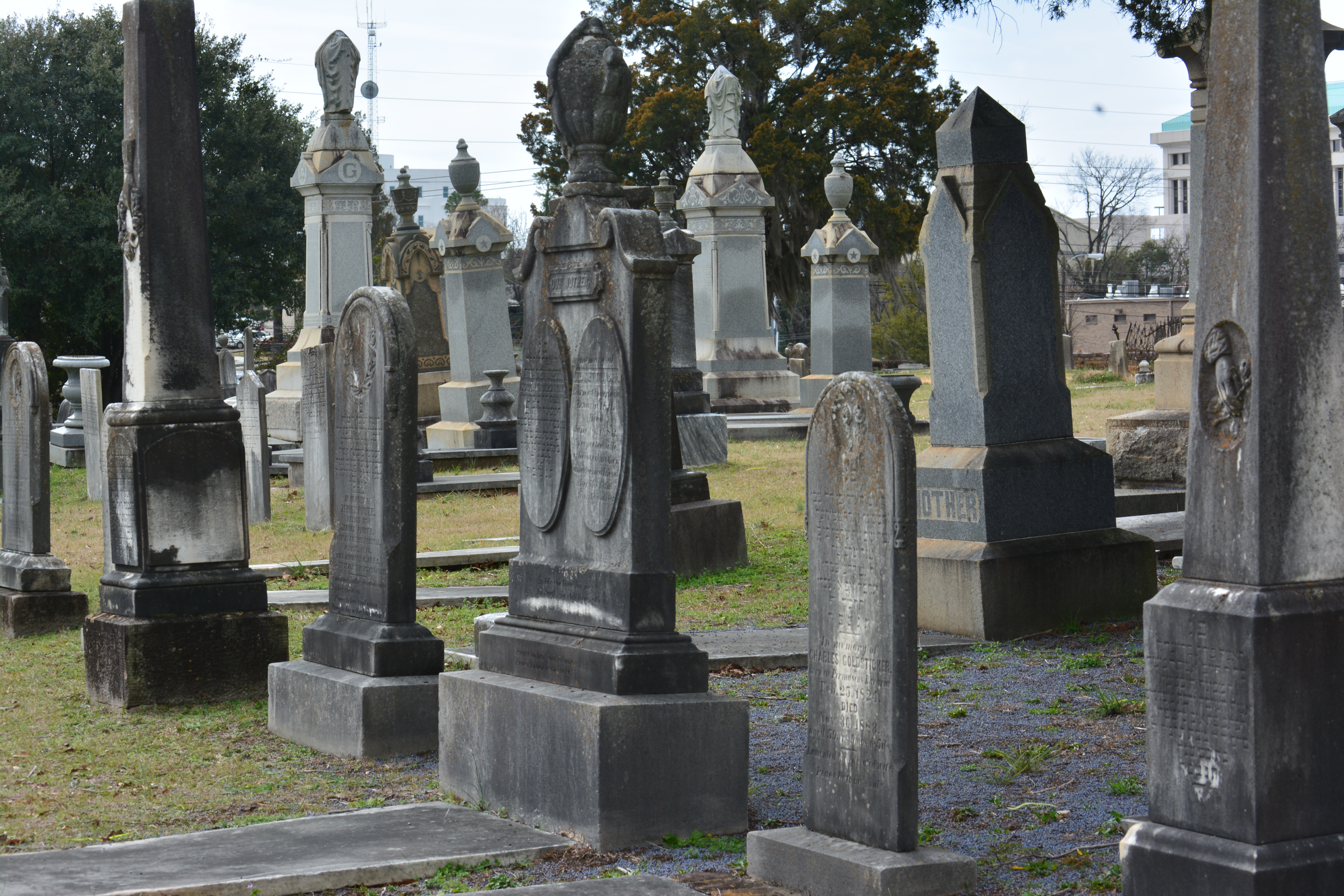

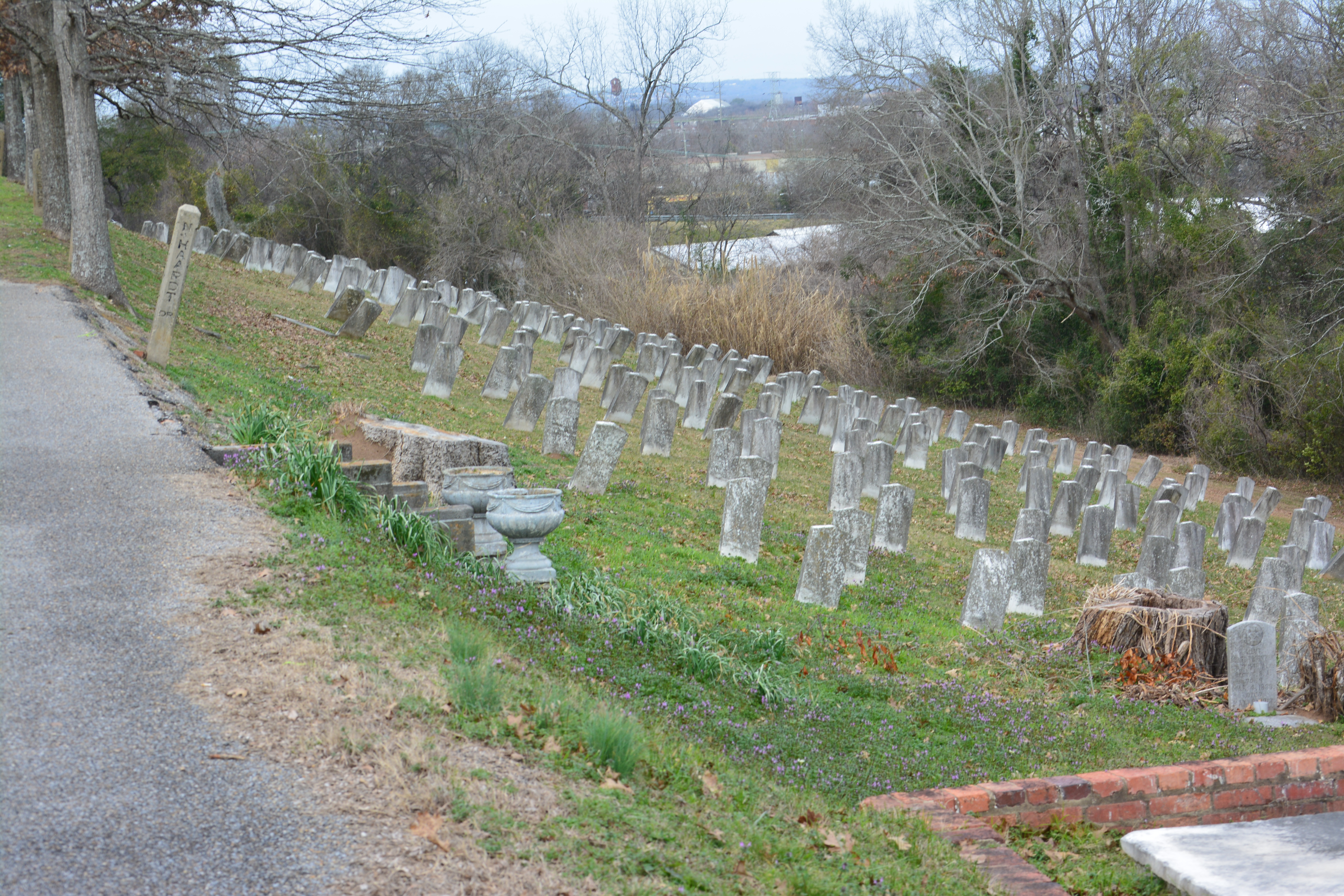

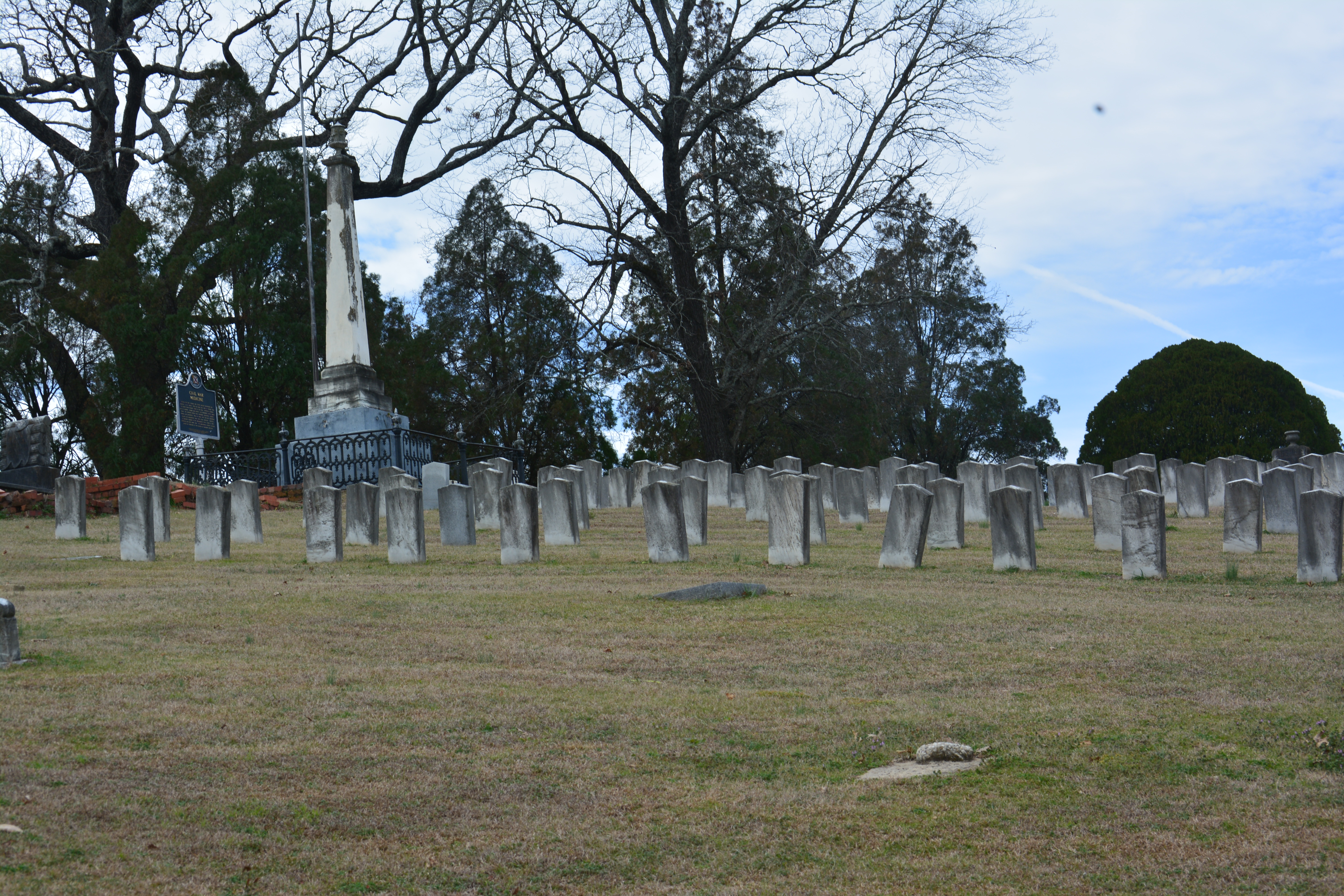

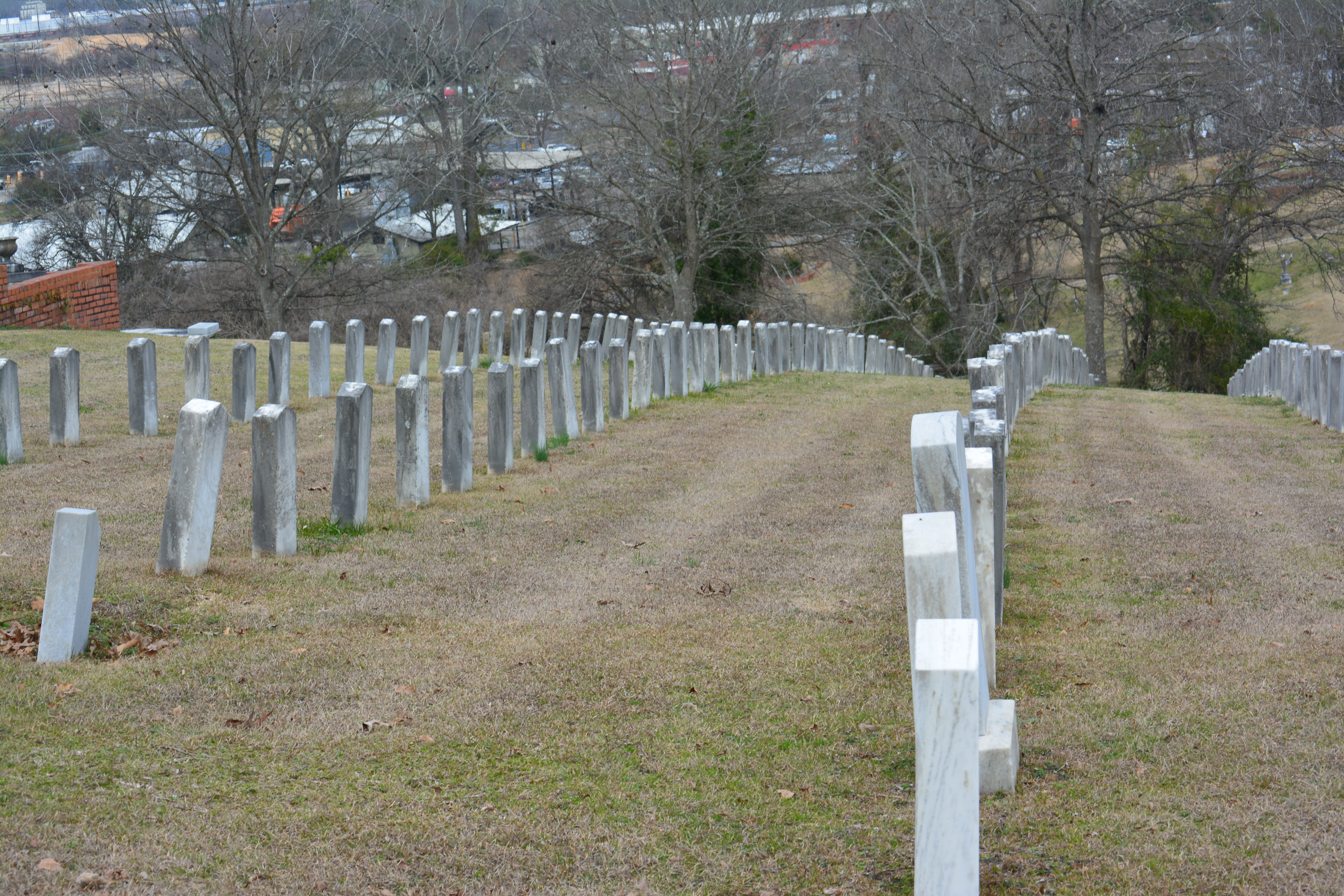

== See also ==
- Cross of Sacrifice
