= National Black Antiwar Antidraft Union =

The National Black Antiwar Antidraft Union (NBAWADU) was founded in February 1968 by Gwen Patton to protest the Vietnam War and the draft. In order to do this, they allied themselves with two other prominent predominantly Black social movement organizations: the Black Panther Party and the Student Nonviolent Coordinating Committee (SNCC).

== History ==
At their first conference to discuss the war, they passed a resolution that addressed the draft. At this conference they stated that it was necessary for the Black Movement in the United States that Black men not to leave for the draft or fight the war in Vietnam. They believed that the draft would lead to the total destruction of Blacks in the United States.

The NBAWADU listed a few alternatives for the draft. The first was a mass organized, but not public, form of resistance. They ordered young Black men not to register when they turned eighteen years of age. They acknowledged that this was would be an illegal mass act, but they deemed it necessary for the survival of African Americans in the United States. Second, they called for Black lawyers in the United States to come to the defense of those who did not register, or they warned of consequences for these lawyers from the Black community. Third, they called for the members of local draft boards and Blacks surrounding them to cause such a disruption that they are unable to proceed with distributing drafts. Fourth, they called for Black males that were already registered to check in Series VIII on form 110 SS and the form certifying CO status. Fifth, they demanded that all information concerning counseling and legal facilities be accessible to Black high school and college students. Sixth, they called for an effort of Blacks to begin the ending of ROTC. And seventh, they called for African Americans to resist the war by yelling "Hell No, I Won't Go!" This was an overall effort to increase Black resistance to the Vietnam war and the draft.

In September 1969 in Chicago, fifteen members of NBAWADU temporarily disrupted draft calls by breaking into the Sixty-third Street Selective Service, and burning the 1-A, or draft eligible, files.

== See also ==
- Vietnam War
- Black Panther Party
