= Greenwood Cemetery (Montgomery, Alabama) =

Cemetery in Montgomery County, Alabama

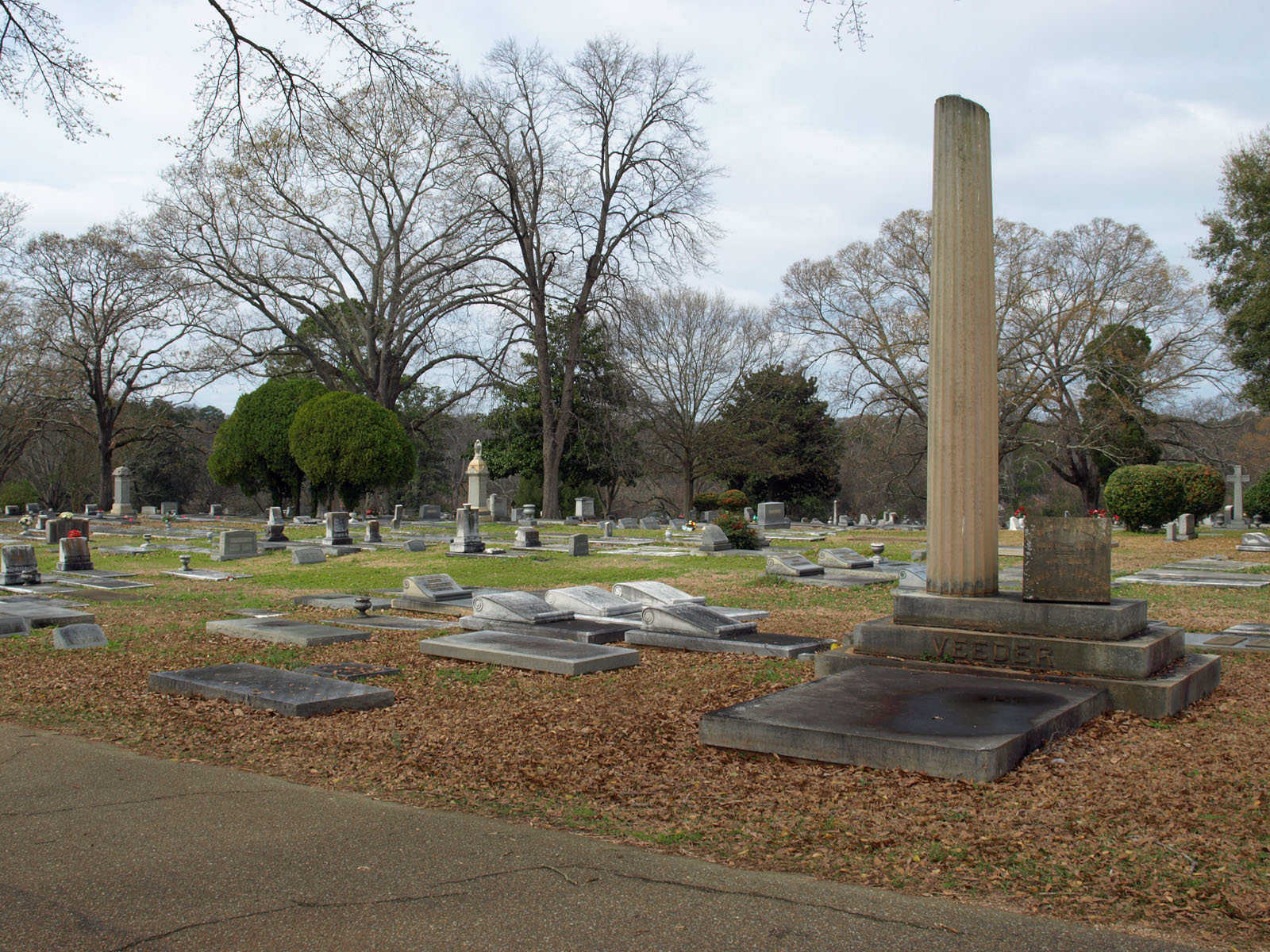
- Interactive map of Greenwood Cemetery

Details
- Established: 1901
- Location: Montgomery, Alabama, US
- Coordinates: 32°22′19″N 86°15′40″W
- Owned by: Dignity Memorial
- No. of interments: ~40,000
- Website: Official website
- Find a Grave: Greenwood Cemetery

Greenwood Cemetery is a cemetery in Montgomery, Alabama, United States.

Notable interments include:

- John Abercrombie, U.S. Congressman
- Bibb Graves, 38th Governor of Alabama
- Dixie Bibb Graves, U.S. Senator and First Lady of Alabama
- J. Lister Hill, U.S. Congressman and Senator
- Reuben Kolb, Alabama's commissioner of agriculture
- William R. Lawley, Jr., United States Army Air Forces officer and Medal of Honor recipient
- Gordon Persons, 43rd Governor of Alabama
- John C. C. Sanders, Civil War Confederate Brigadier General
- George Wallace, 45th Governor of Alabama
- Lurleen Burns Wallace, 46th Governor of Alabama, First Lady of Alabama
- Ed Wells, former pitcher for the Detroit Tigers, New York Yankees and St. Louis Browns.
