= Ed Wells (baseball) =

American baseball player (1900–1986)

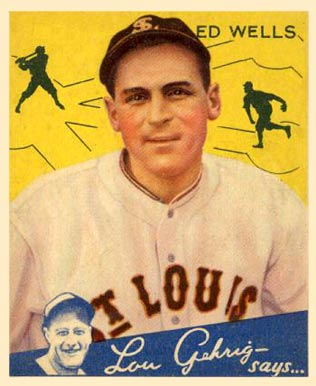
- Pitcher
- Born: June 7, 1900; Ashland, Ohio, U.S.
- Died: May 1, 1986 (aged 85); Montgomery, Alabama, U.S.
- Batted: Left Threw: Left

MLB debut
- June 16, 1923, for the Detroit Tigers

Last MLB appearance
- September 17, 1934, for the St. Louis Browns

MLB statistics
- Win–loss record: 68–69
- Earned run average: 4.65
- Strikeouts: 403
- Stats at Baseball Reference

Teams
- Detroit Tigers (1923–1927); New York Yankees (1928–1932); St. Louis Browns (1933–1934)

Career highlights and awards
- World Series champion (1932)

Edwin Lee Wells (June 7, 1900 – May 1, 1986), nicknamed "Satchelfoot", was an American baseball pitcher. He played professional baseball for 14 seasons from 1923 to 1936, including 11 seasons in Major League Baseball for the Detroit Tigers (1923–1927), New York Yankees (1929–1932), and St. Louis Browns (1933–1934). Wells was a left-handed pitcher, with a hard fastball and a slow curve. Wells appeared in 291 major league games with a 68–69 record and won a World Series championship with the Yankees in 1932.

== Early years ==
Wells was born in Ashland, Ohio, in 1900. His father, Loyal Wells, was an Iowa native and a farmer. His mother, Elizabeth Wells, was an Ohio native. Wells played college baseball for Bethany College in West Virginia.

== Professional baseball ==
=== Detroit Tigers ===
Wells played the 1922 season in the minor leagues at Ludington, Michigan where he had a 1.93 earned run average (ERA).

In 1923, Wells made his major league debut with the Detroit Tigers on June 16, 1923. He appeared in seven games, all in relief, compiling a 5.40 ERA in 10 inning pitched. He returned to the Tigers in 1924, appearing in 29 games, 15 as a starter, with a 6–8 record and 4.06 ERA. In 1925, Wells appeared in a career high 36 games, 14 as a starter, and compiled a 6–9 record with a 6.18 ERA.

Wells had his best season with the Tigers in 1926. He appeared in 36 games, including a career high 26 games as a starter and 178 innings pitched. He compiled a 12–10 record and 4.15 ERA and led the American League with four shutouts. He had two consecutive shutouts in June 1926 during a 33-inning scoreless streak.

Wells' manager in Detroit was his boyhood idol, Ty Cobb. Though one of the greatest hitters of all time, Cobb was, by his own account, not a particularly good coach of pitchers. Cobb biographer, Richard Bak, recounts a discussion between Cobb and Wells. Wells was having a tough time and asked Cobb "what in the name of sense do you think my trouble is." Cobb replied "Ed, that's not something I know nothing about – pitching."

=== Birmingham Barons ===
Wells returned to the minor leagues, playing for the Birmingham Barons of the Southern Association in 1927 and 1928. He compiled a 13–1 record with a 2.13 ERA in 1927 and a 25–7 record with a 2.78 ERA in 1928.

=== New York Yankees ===
On August 28, 1928, the New York Yankees purchased Wells' contract from the Birmingham club subject to the caveat that he would not report to the Yankees until the spring of 1929. Wells was assigned the locker between Babe Ruth and Lou Gehrig. Wells compiled records of 13–9 in 1929 and 12–3 in 1930 as a Yankee. In 1929, Wells had the second most wins among Yankees' pitchers, trailing only George Pipgras. On August 31, 1929, Wells pitched a one-hitter as Babe Ruth hit two home runs. His 1930 winning percentage of .800 (12–3) was the second best in the American League. In 1931, his winning percentage or .643 was eighth best in the league. In his four years with the Yankees, Wells was supported by one of the best batting lineups in history, including Babe Ruth, Lou Gehrig, Tony Lazzeri, Bill Dickey, Bob Meusel, Leo Durocher, and Earle Combs.

=== St. Louis Browns ===
In April 1933, the St. Louis Browns purchased Wells from the Yankees. He played two seasons in St. Louis with a combined two-year record of 7–21. He played his final major league game on September 17, 1934.

=== Minor leagues ===
In November 1934, the Browns sold Wells to the Hollywood Stars of the Pacific Coast League (PCL). He appeared in 39 games for Hollywood in 1935 and compiled a 9–20 record with a 4.33 ERA.

Wells began the 1936 season with the San Diego Padres of the PCL. In June 1936, the Padres traded Wells to the Seattle Indians in exchange for Howard Craghead.

Wells concluded his playing career in 1937 with the New Orleans Pelicans of the Southern Association.

== Later years ==
Wells was married to Annie Mai Wells, a Tennessee native. The couple did not have children.

After his baseball career ended, Wells went into business. In 1940, he lived in Birmingham, Alabama, where he was a partner in a wholesale petroleum products. Wells died following a heart attack on May 1, 1986 at Bapist Hospital in Montgomery, Alabama. His funeral was held on May 3 at Greenwood Cemetery.
