= Reuben Kolb =

American politician (1839–1918)

Reuben Francis Kolb
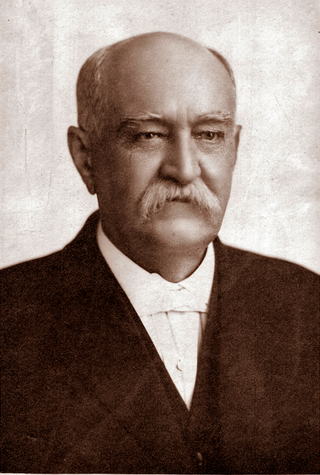
- Reuben Francis Kolb, 1886
- Born: April 15, 1839; Eufaula, Alabama, U.S.
- Died: March 23, 1918 (aged 78)
- Resting place: Greenwood Cemetery, Montgomery, Alabama, U.S.
- Education: University of North Carolina
- Occupation: Politician

Reuben Francis Kolb (1839–1918) was an Alabama politician. Kolb ran unsuccessfully for governor of Alabama thrice, in 1890, 1892 and 1894, first as a Democrat and then as a Populist. He also served as the state's commissioner of agriculture twice, in 1887 and between 1910 and 1914.

== Early life ==
Kolb was born on April 15, 1839, in Eufaula, Barbour County. He fought in the American Civil War, commanding a Confederate artillery unit. He lived "the privileged life of a wealthy Black Belt planter and merchant during the 1850s," but "lost more than half his 3,000 acres of land, and his once-prosperous mercantile store failed." He then managed the Eufaula theater and achieved some success as a truck farmer and developer and distributor of seed stock.

His uncle was the Alabama governor John Gill Shorter.

== Career ==
Kolb was active in the Farmer's Alliance. While a Democrat, Kolb generally opposed the policies of the Redeemers (conservative Southern Democrats), and styled himself as a Jeffersonian Democrat. Unlike the Redeemers, who sought to disenfranchise black voters, Kolb usually supported their political rights, at least initially. However, Kolb ended up supporting the Alabama Constitution of 1901 which took away the vote from blacks, as well as many poor whites.

He has been characterized politically as "a faithful and partisan Democrat who preached the gospel of white supremacy and modern agriculture to his struggling neighbors...." He was elected the first Alabama commissioner of agriculture in 1888.

But with cotton prices declining and poor farmers increasingly forced into sharecropping, Kolb in 1892 challenged the coalition of industrialists and wealthy planters. His third-party agricultural protest movement sought to join poor farmers and sharecroppers with industrial workers and Black voters to assail privilege and power. The appeal prompted a vigorous, white supremacist response from conservative Democrats. Kolb lost the election 115,732 (47.5%) running as an Independent Democrat (with some Republican and Populist support) to Jones 126,955 (52.2%). Two years later as a Populist nominee, he tried to create a coalition of black voters (Republicans) and disenchanted white Populists, but lost to W.C. Oates (Dem) 83,292 (42.9%) to 110,875 (57.1%). The total vote in 1894 was 60,000 votes lower than in 1892, which was a Presidential election. The elections he lost in 1892 and 1894 (to Thomas Goode Jones and William C. Oates, respectively) are considered to have been some of the most corrupt in Alabama's history, with widespread vote tampering and fraud.

In 1894, Kolb retreated from his brief flirtation with the idea of Black rights, "a telling reflection of the shallow commitment of Kolb and many of his followers to the notion of racial equality." And, after his party's electoral failure in 1896, "Kolb confessed his apostasy and pathetically pleaded to be allowed to return to the party of white supremacy."

== Death ==
Kolb died on March 23, 1918. He was buried at the Greenwood Cemetery in Montgomery, Alabama.

Party political offices
First	Populist nominee for Governor of Alabama; 1894	Succeeded by Albert Taylor Goodwyn
