= Thomas William Sadler =

American politician (1831–1896)

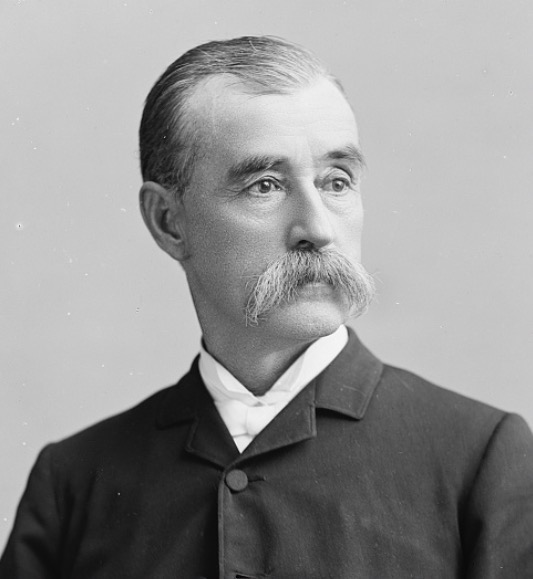
- Portrait of Sadler by Charles Milton Bell, taken between 1873 and 1890

Member of the U.S. House of Representatives from Alabama's 5th district
- In office March 4, 1885 – March 3, 1887
- Preceded by: Thomas Williams
- Succeeded by: James E. Cobb

Personal details
- Born: Thomas William Sadler; April 17, 1831 Russellville, Alabama, US
- Died: October 29, 1896 (aged 65) Prattville, Alabama, US
- Party: Democratic
- Occupation: Politician

Military service
- Allegiance: Confederate States of America
- Years of service: 1861–1862
- Rank: Colonel
- Unit: 19th Alabama Infantry Regiment; 47th Alabama Infantry Regiment
- Battles/wars: American Civil War

Thomas William Sadler (April 17, 1831 – October 29, 1896) was an American politician. A Democrat, he was a member of the United States House of Representatives from Alabama.

Born near Russellville, Alabama, Sadler was educated at the University of Alabama and later practiced law. During the American Civil War, he served in the Confederate States Army. He served in Congress from 1885 to 1887, representing Alabama's 5th district.

== Early life and early career ==
Sadler was born on April 17, 1831, near Russellville, Alabama, the son of Allious Turner Sadler and Caroline Martha (née Owen) Sadler. His father died in 1844, after which his mother married clergyman Reuben Phillips. In 1833, he moved to Jefferson County. He was educated at schools in Jonesboro and Summerfield, as well as from the University of Alabama.

In 1851, Sadler was hired to the Salem Male and Female Academy as an assistant teacher; he was a trustee in 1854. At age 21, he became a justice of the peace. In 1855, he moved to Autauga County, where he worked as a merchant. He co-operated a general store on Prattville until 1859. In late 1860, he coedited the Southern Statesman newspaper.

== Military service and later career ==
At the onset of the American Civil War, Sadler served in the 19th Alabama Infantry Regiment, of the Confederate States Army. In March 1862, he became a colonel in the 47th Alabama Infantry Regiment, though was removed from the unit before its full organization in May of that year.

In 1870, Sadler was vice-president of a life insurance company branch. He read law, being admitted to the bar in 1867, and in the mid-1870s, began practicing law in Prattville. From 1875 to 1884, he was a school superintendent. He was also a farmer.

Sadler was a Democrat. He was a manager of the 1865 United States House of Representatives elections in Alabama. In 1874, he was a delegate to the Alabama State Convention, then was a Presidential elector in the 1880 United States presidential election.

Sadler was a member of the House from March 4, 1885, to March 3, 1887, representing Alabama's 5th district. He did not run in the following election. While in Congress, he was a member of the Committees on Private Land Claims and on Territories. Politically, he was liberal. Before the Civil War, he was anti-abolitionist.

In 1888, Sadler resumed practicing law, continuing to practice until his death.

== Personal life and death ==
In October 1854, Sadler married Catherine Mims, with whom he had ten children. She died in 1883, and in 1884, he married Mary Bowen. He was a Freemason. He died on October 29, 1896, aged 65, in Prattville, from erysipelas and sepsis caused by a carbuncle on his leg. He was buried at Oak Hill Cemetery, in Prattville.

U.S. House of Representatives
Preceded by Thomas Williams	Member of the U.S. House of Representatives from Alabama's 5th congressional district 1885-1887	Succeeded by James E. Cobb
