= 1892 Alabama gubernatorial election =

- August 1, 1892
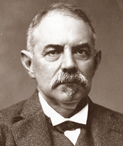

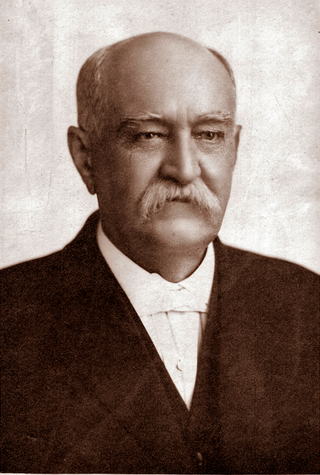
Nominee	Thomas G. Jones	Reuben Kolb
Party	Democratic	Independent Democrat
Alliance		Populist
Popular vote	126,955	115,732
Percentage	52.19%	47.58%
- County results Jones: 50–60% 60–70% 70–80% 80–90% Kolb: 50–60% 60–70% 70–80%
Governor before election
Thomas G. Jones
Democratic
Elected Governor
Thomas G. Jones
Democratic

The 1892 Alabama gubernatorial election took place on August 1, 1892, in order to elect the governor of Alabama.

== Background ==
Following the end of Reconstruction in Alabama, the Populist movement rose as an alliance of small-scale farmers and poor laborers to challenge the state's planter aristocracy. Populists supported policies such as government regulation of railroads, a silver standard for currency, and public storage of crops to drive up agricultural prices. In contrast, the Bourbon Democrats represented the land-owning elite in the state who were returned to power after Reconstruction ended.

In 1890, Reuben Kolb, a member of the Farmers' Alliance, challenged Thomas Goode Jones for the Democratic nomination for Governor; after Jones took the nomination, Kolb accused him and the Bourbon Democrats of illegal tactics.

== General election ==
=== Candidates ===
- Thomas G. Jones, incumbent Governor (Democratic)
- Reuben Kolb, Commissioner of Agriculture (Independent Democratic, Populist)

=== Campaign ===
In 1892, Kolb again challenged Jones for the Democratic nomination. Though he denied he was a Populist, he accepted the endorsement of the People's Party. After Jones again won the regular Democratic nomination, Kolb also accepted the endorsement of the "Jeffersonian Democrats." The Republican Party, which was limited to a presence in a few northern counties, did not field a candidate or make any formal endorsement, but most white Republicans supported Kolb, if only to injure the regular Democrats. Jones's supporters were traditional Democrats, including lawyers, politicians, the press (except for a small group of reform newspapers), and wealthy farmers.

Though African Americans in the Black Belt were normally Republicans and they overwhelmingly favored Kolb, their vote was rigidly controlled by the Democrats, who dominated economic life and the machinery of government in the Black Belt. During the campaign, money, whiskey, and threats were used to influence and change votes.

=== Results ===
Alabamians turned out in large numbers for the August election, with 243,037 ballots cast. Jones received 126,959 votes to Kolb's 115,524, and 544 ballots were scattered among minor candidates. In the fifteen Black Belt counties, Jones defeated Kolb by the runaway margin of 30,117 votes. He received majority votes in Montgomery County (6,254 votes), Dallas County (6,117 votes), and Wilcox County (5,350 votes). Of Kolb's 37 counties, only five were in the Black Belt, and his majorities were much narrower than elsewhere in the state.

1892 Alabama gubernatorial election
Party	Candidate	Votes	%
Democratic	Thomas G. Jones (incumbent)	126,955	52.19
Independent Democrat	Reuben Kolb	115,732	47.58
Other	Write-ins	550	0.23
Total votes		243,237	100.00
Democratic hold			

Election fraud was likely rampant. Ballot boxes with Kolb majorities were stolen after the election. In the Black Belt, returns were announced, changed, and announced again to show larger majorities for Jones. In Pike County, collusion between the sheriff and elections officials carried the vote for Jones. Kolb and other reform leaders issued legal threats, but because Alabama did not have a law permitting election contests, they ultimately could do nothing. Historical analysis has declared that Kolb was the legitimately elected governor but was counted out in the Black Belt.

== Aftermath ==
Kolb also ran for governor in 1894 and lost under similar circumstances.
