= James E. Belser =

American politician (1800–1854)

Member of the U.S. House of Representatives from Alabama's 2nd district
- In office March 4, 1843 – March 3, 1845
- Preceded by: David Hubbard
- Succeeded by: Henry Washington Hilliard

Member of the Alabama House of Representatives
- In office 1828; 1854; 1858

Personal details
- Born: James Edwin Belser; December 22, 1805 Charleston, South Carolina, US
- Died: January 16, 1859 (aged 53) Montgomery, Alabama, US
- Party: Democratic

James Edwin Belser (December 22, 1805 – January 16, 1854) was an attorney and politician who served as a U.S. representative from Alabama.

Born in Charleston, South Carolina, Belser attended the public schools. In 1820, he moved with his parents to Sumter District, South Carolina, where he continued his schooling under a private tutor; his parents operated a major slave plantation of over 3,000 acres and 50 slaves. He moved to Alabama in 1825 and settled in Montgomery. He studied law, and he was admitted to the bar and commenced practice in Montgomery.

Belser was elected clerk of the county court. He served as member of the Alabama House of Representatives in 1828. He also edited the Planters Gazette for several years. He was appointed solicitor of Montgomery County in 1828 and later elected to that position. He was appointed by Governor Fitzpatrick in 1842 as a commissioner of the State to procure a settlement of the claims against the federal government for money advanced in the Indian War of 1836.

Belser was elected as a Democrat to the Twenty-eighth Congress (March 4, 1843 – March 3, 1845). He declined to be a candidate for renomination in 1844. He resumed the practice of law in Montgomery. He was affiliated with the Whig Party in 1848.

Belser was again elected a member of the state House of Representatives in 1853 and reelected in 1857. He died in Montgomery, Alabama, January 16, 1859. He was interred in Oakwood Cemetery.

Belser was a slave owner. As of the 1850 census, he owned at least 10 enslaved people.

U.S. House of Representatives
Preceded by David Hubbard	Member of the U.S. House of Representatives from Alabama's 2nd congressional district March 4, 1843 – March 3, 1845	Succeeded by Henry Washington Hilliard
