= William C. Oates =

American politician (1835–1910)

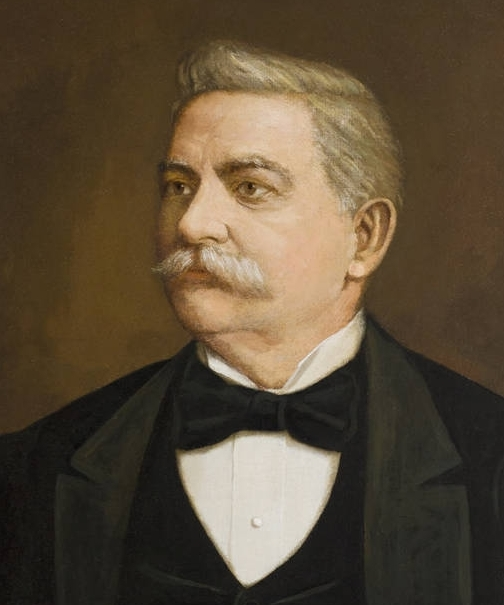

29th Governor of Alabama
- In office December 1, 1894 – December 1, 1896
- Preceded by: Thomas G. Jones
- Succeeded by: Joseph F. Johnston

Member of the U.S. House of Representatives from Alabama's 3rd district
- In office March 4, 1881 – November 5, 1894
- Preceded by: William J. Samford
- Succeeded by: George Paul Harrison, Jr.

Member of the Alabama House of Representatives
- In office 1870–1872

Personal details
- Born: November 30, 1835 Pike County, Alabama, U.S.
- Died: September 9, 1910 (aged 74) Montgomery, Alabama, U.S.
- Resting place: Oakwood Cemetery (Montgomery, Alabama)
- Party: Democratic

Military service
- Allegiance: United States of America; Confederate States of America
- Branch/service: Confederate States Army (CSA); United States Army (USA)
- Years of service: 1861–1865; 1898
- Rank: Colonel (CSA); Brigadier General (USA)
- Commands: 15th Alabama Infantry; 48th Alabama
- Battles/wars: American Civil War Battle of Gettysburg Battle of Chickamauga Battle of the Wilderness Battle of Spotsylvania Court House; Spanish–American War

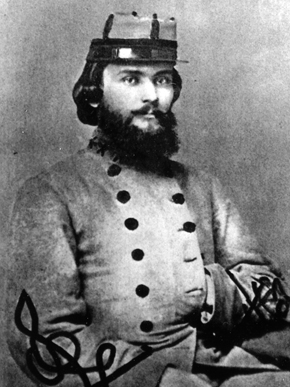
Oates as a soldier during the Civil War

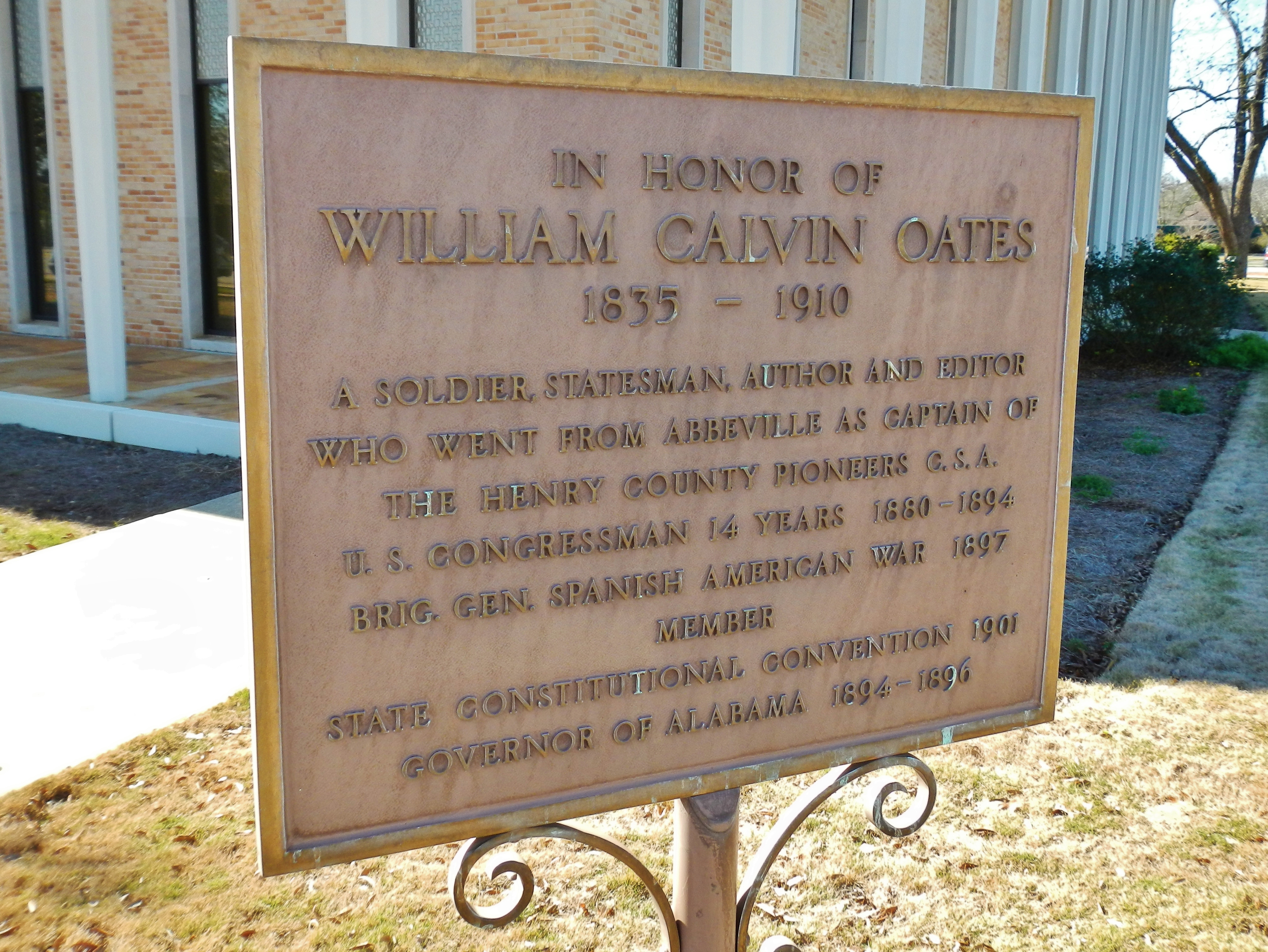
A historic marker honoring Oates stands next to the Henry County Courthouse in Abbeville.

William Calvin Oates (either November 30 or December 1, 1835 – September 9, 1910) was a colonel in the Confederate States Army during the American Civil War, the 29th governor of Alabama from 1894 to 1896, and a brigadier general in the U.S. Army during the Spanish–American War.

== Early life ==
Oates was born in Pike County, Alabama, to William and Sarah (Sellers) Oates, a poor farming family. All of his ancestors came to North America during the colonial era, and all of them came from the two countries of England and Wales. At the age of 17, he believed that he had killed a man in a violent brawl and left home for Florida. Oates became a drifter, settling in Texas for a couple of years before returning to Alabama at the urging of his younger brother John, who the family had dispatched to locate him. He studied law at the Lawrenceville Academy in Lawrenceville and passed the bar examination, and then opened a practice in Abbeville.

== Civil War ==
William C. Oates joined the Confederate States Army in July 1861 and entered the army as captain, 15th Alabama Infantry Regiment, and eventually became the commander of the 15th Alabama Infantry Regiment in the spring of 1863. He fought in the Battle of Gettysburg, leading his troops in a series of charges on Little Round Top, where his brother John was killed. Oates believed that if his regiment had been able to take Little Round Top, the Army of Northern Virginia might have won the battle and marched on to take Washington, D.C. Oates later stated that if even a single additional Confederate regiment had joined the assault, the attack could have succeeded, turning the U.S. flank and threatening the entire Army of the Potomac.

Oates stated:

His [Col. Chamberlain's] skill and persistency and the great bravery of his men saved Little Round Top and the Army of the Potomac from defeat. [If one more Confederate regiment had stormed the far left of the Army of the Potomac with the 15th Alabama,] "...we would have completely turned the flank and have won Little Round Top, which would have forced Meade's whole left wing to retire." He concluded, philosophically, that "great events sometimes turn on comparatively small affairs."

Oates later participated in the battles of Chickamauga, the Wilderness, Spotsylvania Court House, and Cold Harbor. After losing command of his colonelcy of the 15th Alabama because of a political move, he was made colonel of the 48th Alabama by Confederate President Jefferson Davis. Oates was wounded during the Battle of Fussell's Mill on the outskirts of Richmond, losing his right arm, which ended his active service.

== Postbellum career ==
Oates resumed his law practice in Henry County, Alabama, and served as a delegate to the 1868 Democratic National Convention. From 1870 to 1872, he was a member of the Alabama House of Representatives. In 1880, he was elected to the U.S. House of Representatives, serving seven consecutive terms. Oates married Sarah Toney of Eufaula on March 28, 1882, and they had one son, William Calvin, Jr., who eventually joined his father in the law practice.

Oates was elected governor of Alabama in 1894 in a bitter campaign. Two years later, he unsuccessfully tried to secure his party's nomination as a candidate for the United States Senate. President William McKinley commissioned Oates as a brigadier general in 1898, and he served in the Spanish–American War. He returned to his law practice and speculated in real estate. He tried unsuccessfully to have a monument erected at Gettysburg to his comrades in the old 15th Alabama, including his fallen brother.

Oates died in Montgomery, and was buried in Oakwood Cemetery.

Party political offices
Preceded by Thomas G. Jones	Democratic nominee for Governor of Alabama; 1894	Succeeded by Joseph F. Johnston
U.S. House of Representatives
Preceded by William J. Samford	Member of the U.S. House of Representatives from Alabama's 3rd congressional district March 4, 1881 – November 5, 1894	Succeeded by George Paul Harrison, Jr.
Political offices
Preceded by Thomas G. Jones	Governor of Alabama; 1894–1896	Succeeded by Joseph F. Johnston
